= Podkarpackie Voivodeship Sejmik =

Podkarpackie Voivodeship Sejmik Sejmik Województwa Podkarpackiego

Type
- Type: Unicameral

Leadership
- Chairperson: Jerzy Borcz, PiS
- Vice-Chairpersons: Renata Karp, Czesław Łączak, Joanna Bril
- Marshal: Władysław Ortyl, PiS

Structure
- Seats: 33 councillors
- Political groups: Executive board (21): PiS (21); PiS (20); SP (1); Opposition parties (12): KO (6); PO (4); Independent (2); PSL (3); KiBS (2); NN (1); Independent (1); P2050 (1)

Elections
- Last election: 7 April 2024

Meeting place
- Marshal's Office, Rzeszów

Website
- Subcarpathian Regional Assembly

The Podkarpackie Voivodeship Sejmik (Polish: Sejmik Województwa Podkarpackiego) is the regional legislature of the Voivodeship of Podkarpackie in Poland. It is a unicameral parliamentary body consisting of thirty-three councillors elected every five-years. The current chairperson of the assembly is Jerzy Borcz of the PiS.

The assembly elects the executive board that acts as the collective executive for the regional government, headed by the voivodeship marshal. The current Executive Board of Podkarpackie is held by the Law and Justice with Władysław Ortyl presiding as marshal.

The assembly meets in the Marshal's Office in Rzeszów.

== Districts ==
Members of the Podkarpackie Regional Assembly are elected from five districts and serve five-year terms. Districts do not have formal names. Instead, each constituency has a number and territorial description.

Number	Seats	City counties	Land counties
1	7	Rzeszów	Łańcut, Leżajsk, Rzeszów
2	6	None	Dębica, Mielec, Ropczyce-Sędziszów, Strzyżów
3	6	Tarnobrzeg	Kolbuszowa, Nisko, Stalowa Wola, Tarnobrzeg
4	6	Przemyśl	Jarosław, Lubaczów, Przemyśl, Przeworsk
5	8	Krosno	Bieszczady, Brzozów, Jasło, Krosno, Lesko, Sanok

== See also ==
- Polish Regional Assembly
- Podkarpackie Voivodeship
