= Lublin Voivodeship Sejmik =

Lublin Voivodeship Sejmik Sejmik Województwa Lubelskiego

Type
- Type: Unicameral

Leadership
- Chairperson: Mieczysław Ryba, PiS
- Vice-Chairpersons: Kamila Grywaczewska, Jerzy Szwaj, Krzysztof Gałaszkiewicz
- Marshal: Jarosław Stawiarski, PiS

Structure
- Seats: 33 councillors
- Political groups: Executive board (21): PiS (21); PiS (20); Independent (1); Opposition parties (12): KO (6); PO (6); PSL (4); KiBS (1); NN (1); P2050 (1)

Elections
- Last election: 7 April 2024

Meeting place
- Marshal's Office, Lublin

Website
- Lublin Regional Assembly

The Lublin Voivodeship Sejmik (Polish: Sejmik Województwa Lubelskiego) is the regional legislature of the Lublin Voivodeship, Poland. It is a unicameral parliamentary body consisting of thirty-three councillors chosen during regional elections for a five-year term. The current chairperson of the assembly is Mieczysław Ryba.

The assembly elects the executive board that acts as the collective executive for the provincial government, headed by the voivodeship marshal. The current executive board of Lublin is held by the Law and Justice party under the leadership of Marshal Jarosław Stawiarski.

The assembly meets within the Marshal's Office in the capital city of Lublin.

== Districts ==
Members of the Assembly are elected from five districts and serve five-year terms. Districts does not have the constituencies formal names. Instead, each constituency has a number and territorial description.

Number	Seats	City counties	Land counties
1	5	Lublin	None
2	9	None	Janów, Kraśnik, Lubartów, Lublin, Opole, Puławy, Ryki
3	6	Biała Podlaska	Biała, Łuków, Parczew, Radzyń
4	6	Chełm	Chełm, Krasnystaw, Łęczna, Świdnik, Włodawa
5	7	Zamość	Biłgoraj, Hrubieszów, Tomaszów, Zamość

== 2026 Lviv–Lublin diplomatic incident ==
On 26 October 2026, the Lublin Voivodeship Sejmik (Poland) unanimously voted to terminate its 2004 official partnership and cooperation agreement with the Lviv Oblast Council (Ukraine). All 30 regional assembly members present supported the motion after the Lviv authorities failed to meet a deadline to withdraw a controversial historical resolution. Concurrently, the City Council of Przemyśl voted to suspend its municipal partnership with the city of Lviv.

The diplomatic fallout was triggered by an October 20 decision made by the Lviv Oblast Council, which officially declared the year 2027 as the "Year of the Ukrainian Insurgent Army (UPA), Roman Shukhevych, and Oleh Olzhych". Polish authorities strongly condemned the move, as the UPA and its commander Roman Shukhevych are held responsible by Polish historians for the massacres of Poles in Volhynia and Eastern Galicia during World War World II.

Polish Prime Minister Donald Tusk criticized the Lviv decision, calling it harmful to Ukraine's own interests and its European integration. Following the backlash, the Ministry of Foreign Affairs of Ukraine issued a statement describing the regional council's resolution as "counterproductive" to bilateral relations. Furthermore, Poland's Foreign Ministry subsequently placed Sviatoslav Sheremeta, the Lviv regional councilor who initiated the UPA commemoration, on a list of persona non grata, banning him from entering the Schengen Area for five years. Polish regional officials emphasized that while they maintain full humanitarian and military solidarity with the Ukrainian people amid the ongoing Russian invasion, they refuse to sustain formal institutional ties with entities that officially honor figures associated with wartime ethnic cleansing.

== See also ==
- Polish Regional Assembly
- Lublin Voivodeship
