= Lower Silesian Voivodeship Sejmik =

Regional legislature in Poland

Lower Silesian Voivodeship Sejmik Sejmik Województwa Dolnośląskiego

Type
- Type: Unicameral

Leadership
- Chairperson: Jerzy Pokój, PO
- Vice-Chairpersons: Marek Łapiński, Damian Mrozek, Cezary Przybylski
- Marshal: Paweł Gancarz, PSL

Structure
- Seats: 36 councillors
- Political groups: Executive board (20): KO (15); KO (13); PL2050 (1); SLD (1); BS–PSL (5); BS (3); PSL (1); Independent (1); Opposition parties (11): PiS (6); PiS (6); R+ (3); Centre (1); L (1); NL (1); Non-Aligned (5): Non-aligned (5)

Elections
- Last election: 7 April 2024

Meeting place
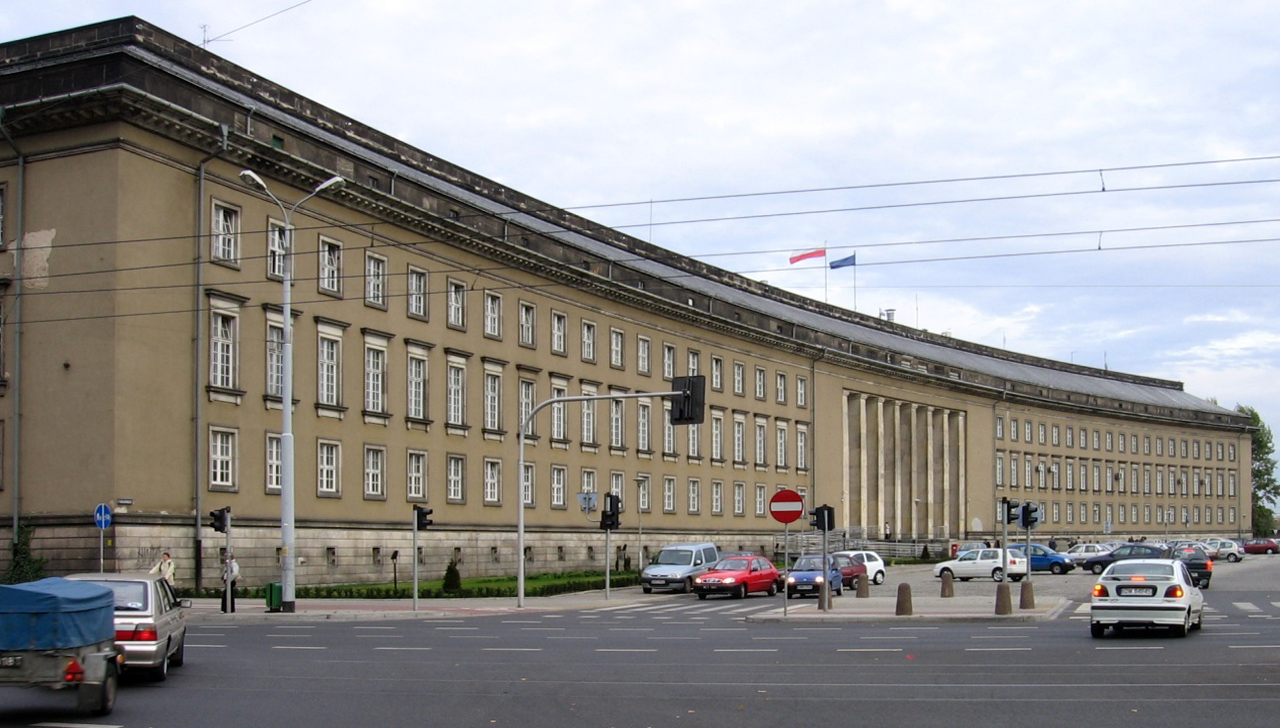
- Voivodeship Office, Wrocław

Website
- Lower Silesian Regional Assembly

The Lower Silesian Voivodeship Sejmik (Polish: Sejmik Województwa Dolnośląskiego) is the regional legislature of the Voivodeship of Lower Silesia in Poland. It is a unicameral legislature consisting of thirty-six councillors chosen during local elections with a five-year term. The current chairperson of the assembly is Jerzy Pokój.

The assembly elects the executive board that acts as the collective executive for the regional government, headed by the province's marshal. The current Executive Board of Lower Silesia is a coalition government between Civic Coalition, Polish People's Party and the Independents. The current marshal is Paweł Gancarz.

The assembly convenes within the Voivodeship Office building in central Wrocław.

== Districts ==
Members of the Assembly are elected from five districts, serving five-year terms. Districts does not have the constituencies' formal names. Instead, each constituency has a number and territorial description.

Number	Seats	City counties	Land counties
1	7	Wrocław	None
2	7	None	Góra, Milicz, Oleśnica, Oława, Strzelin, Środa, Trzebnica, Wołów, Wrocław
3	9	None	Dzierżoniów, Kłodzko, Świdnica, Wałbrzych, Ząbkowice
4	6	Jelenia Góra	Bolesławiec, Karkonosze, Kamienna Góra, Lubań, Lwówek, Zgorzelec
5	7	Legnica	Głogów, Jawor, Legnica, Lubin, Polkowice, Złotoryja

== Composition ==
=== 1998 ===
Party	Mandate
Sojusz Lewicy Demokratycznej	25
Akcja Wyborcza Solidarność	19
Unia Wolności	9
Przymierze Społeczne	2
Total	55

=== 2002 ===
Party	Mandate
Sojusz Lewicy Demokratycznej – Unia Pracy	12
Samoobrona Rzeczpospolitej Polskiej	8
Platforma Obywatelska – Prawo i Sprawiedliwość	6
Liga Polskich Rodzin	6
Unia Samorządowa	2
Polskie Stronnictwo Ludowe	2
Total	36

=== 2006 ===
Party	Mandate
Platforma Obywatelska	16
Prawo i Sprawiedliwość	10
Lewica i Demokraci	4
Polskie Stronnictwo Ludowe	3
Samoobrona Rzeczpospolitej Polskiej	3
Total	36

=== 2010 ===
Party	Mandate
Platforma Obywatelska	15
KWW Rafała Dutkiewicza	9
Prawo i Sprawiedliwość	7
Sojusz Lewicy Demokratycznej	4
Polskie Stronnictwo Ludowe	1
Total	36

=== 2014 ===
Party	Mandate
Platforma Obywatelska	16
Prawo i Sprawiedliwość	9
Polskie Stronnictwo Ludowe	5
Bezpartyjni Samorządowcy	4
SLD Lewica Razem	2
Total	36

=== 2018 ===
Party	Mandate
Prawo i Sprawiedliwość	14
Koalicja Obywatelska	13
Bezpartyjni Samorządowcy	6
Z Dutkiewiczem dla Dolnego Śląska	2
Polskie Stronnictwo Ludowe	1
Total	36

=== 2024 ===
Party	Mandate
Koalicja Obywatelska	15
Prawo i Sprawiedliwość	13
TD	4
Bezpartyjni Samorządowcy	3
L	1
Total	36

== See also ==
- Polish Regional Assembly
- Lower Silesian Voivodeship
