= Lubusz Voivodeship Sejmik =

Sejmik Województwa Lubuskiego

Type
- Type: Unicameral
- Houses: Voivodeship sejmik (sejmik województwa)

Leadership
- Chairperson: Anna Synowiec, KO
- Vice-Chairperson: Elżbieta Płonka, Edward Ferdko, Anna Chinalska
- Marshal: Marcin Jabłoński, PO

Structure
- Seats: 30 councillors
- Political groups: Executive board (19): KO (14); PO (12); .N (1); SLD (1); TD-PL2050-PSL (6); PSL (4); PL2050 (2); Opposition: PiS (10); PiS (10)

Elections
- Last election: 7 April 2024

Meeting place
- Marshal's Office, Zielona Góra

Website
- Lubusz Regional Assembly

The Lubusz Voivodeship Sejmik (Polish: Sejmik Województwa Lubuskiego) is the regional legislature of the voivodeship of Lubusz, Poland. It is a unicameral body consists of thirty councillors elected in free elections for a five-year term. The current chairperson of the assembly is Anna Synowiec (Civic Coalition).

The assembly elects the executive board that acts as the collective executive for the regional government, headed by the province's marshal. The current Executive Board of Greater Poland is a coalition government between Civic Coalition, Polish People's Party and Poland 2050 with Marcin Jabłoński of Civic Coalition presiding as marshal.

The Regional Assembly meets in the Marshal's Office in Zielona Góra.

== Districts ==
Members of the Assembly are elected from five districts, serve five-year terms. Districts does not have the constituencies formal names. Instead, each constituency has a number and territorial description.

Number	Seats	City counties	Land counties
1	7	Gorzów Wielkopolski	Gorzów, Strzelce-Drezdenko
2	6	None	Międzyrzecz, Słubice, Sulęcin, Świebodzin
3	5	None	Krosno, Żary
4	6	Zielona Góra	Zielona Góra
5	6	None	Nowa Sól, Wschowa, Żagań

== See also ==
- Polish Regional Assembly
- Lubusz Voivodeship
