= Łódź Voivodeship Sejmik =

Sejmik Województwa Łódzkiego

Type
- Type: Unicameral
- Houses: Voivodeship Sejmik (sejmik wojewódzki)

Leadership
- Chairperson: Małgorzata Grabarczyk, KO
- Vice-Chairpersons: Piotr Bors, Magdalena Spólnicka
- Marshal: Joanna Skrzydlewska, KO

Structure
- Seats: 33 councillors
- Political groups: Executive board (17): KO (12); PO (10); .N (1); Independent (1); TD (4); PSL (3); P2050 (1); L (1); NL (1); Opposition (16): PiS (16); PiS (14); SP (2)

Elections
- Last election: 7 April 2024

Meeting place
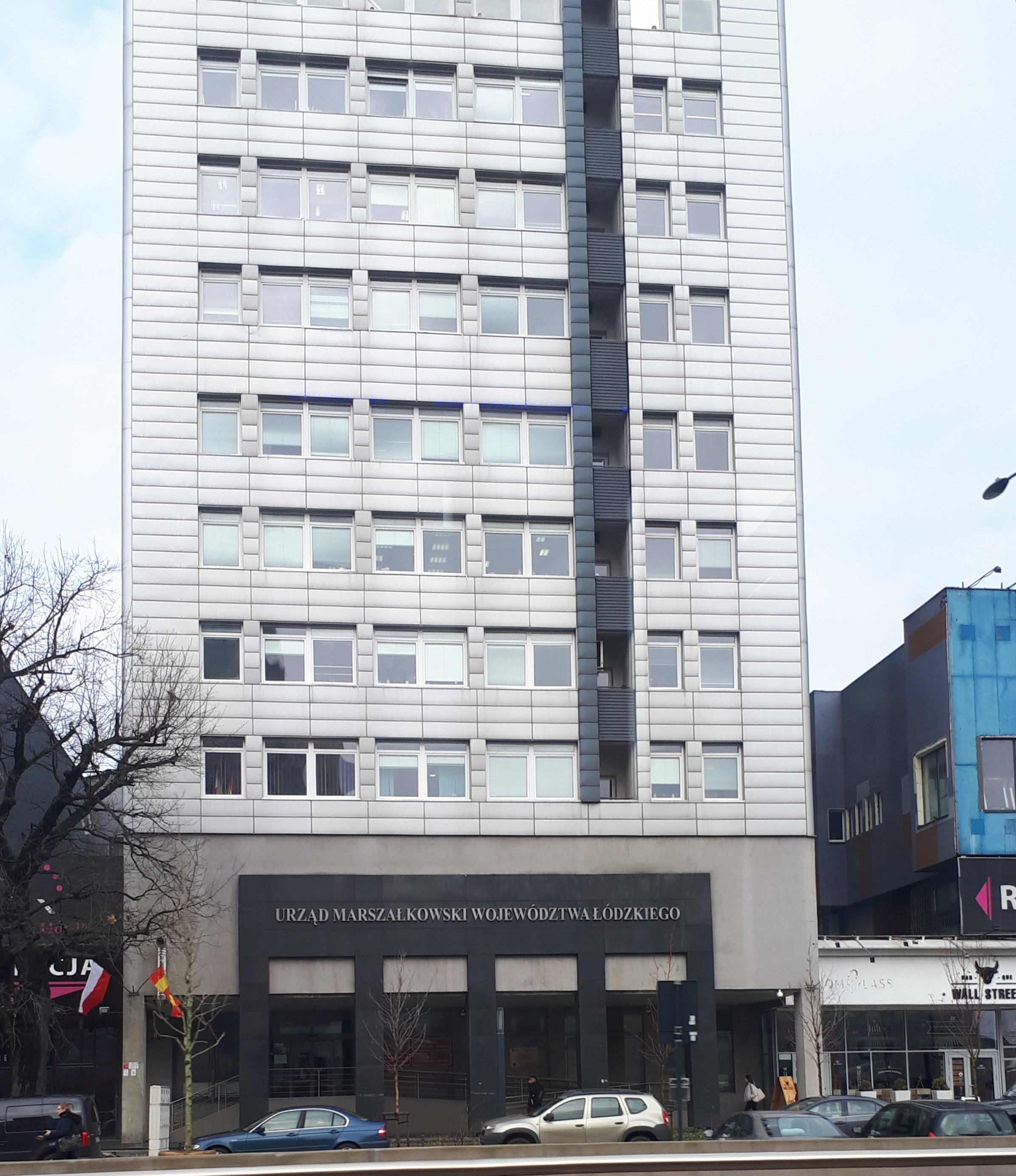
- Seat of the Regional Assembly in Piłsudskiego 8

Website
- Łódź Regional Assembly

The Łódź Voivodeship Sejmik (Polish: Sejmik Województwa Łódzkiego) is the regional legislature of the voivodeship of Łódź, Poland. It is a unicameral body consists of thirty-three councillors elected in free elections for a five-year term. The current chairperson of the assembly is Małgorzata Grabarczyk.

The assembly elects the executive board that acts as the collective executive for the regional government, headed by the province's marshal. The current executive board is a coalition government between Civic Coalition, Third Way and The Left, headed by Marshal Joanna Skrzydlewska

The Regional Assembly meets in the Marshal's Office in Łódź City.

== Districts ==
Members of the Assembly are elected from five districts, serve five-year terms. Districts does not have the constituencies formal names. Instead, each constituency has a number and territorial description.

Number	Seats	City counties	Land counties
1	9	part of Łódź	None
2	5	None	Kutno, Łęczyca, Łowicz, Zgierz
3	8	None	Łask, Pabianice, Pajęczno, Poddębice, Sieradz, Wieluń, Wieruszów, Zduńska Wola
4	6	Piotrków Trybunalski	Bełchatów, Łódź East, Piotrków, Radomsko
5	5	Skierniewice	Brzeziny, Opoczno, Rawa, Skierniewice, Tomaszów

== See also ==
- Polish Regional Assembly
- Łódź Voivodeship

== Charts ==
1998

2006

2010

2014

2018
