= Voivodeship sejmik =

The regional-level elected legislature for each of the sixteen voivodeships of Poland

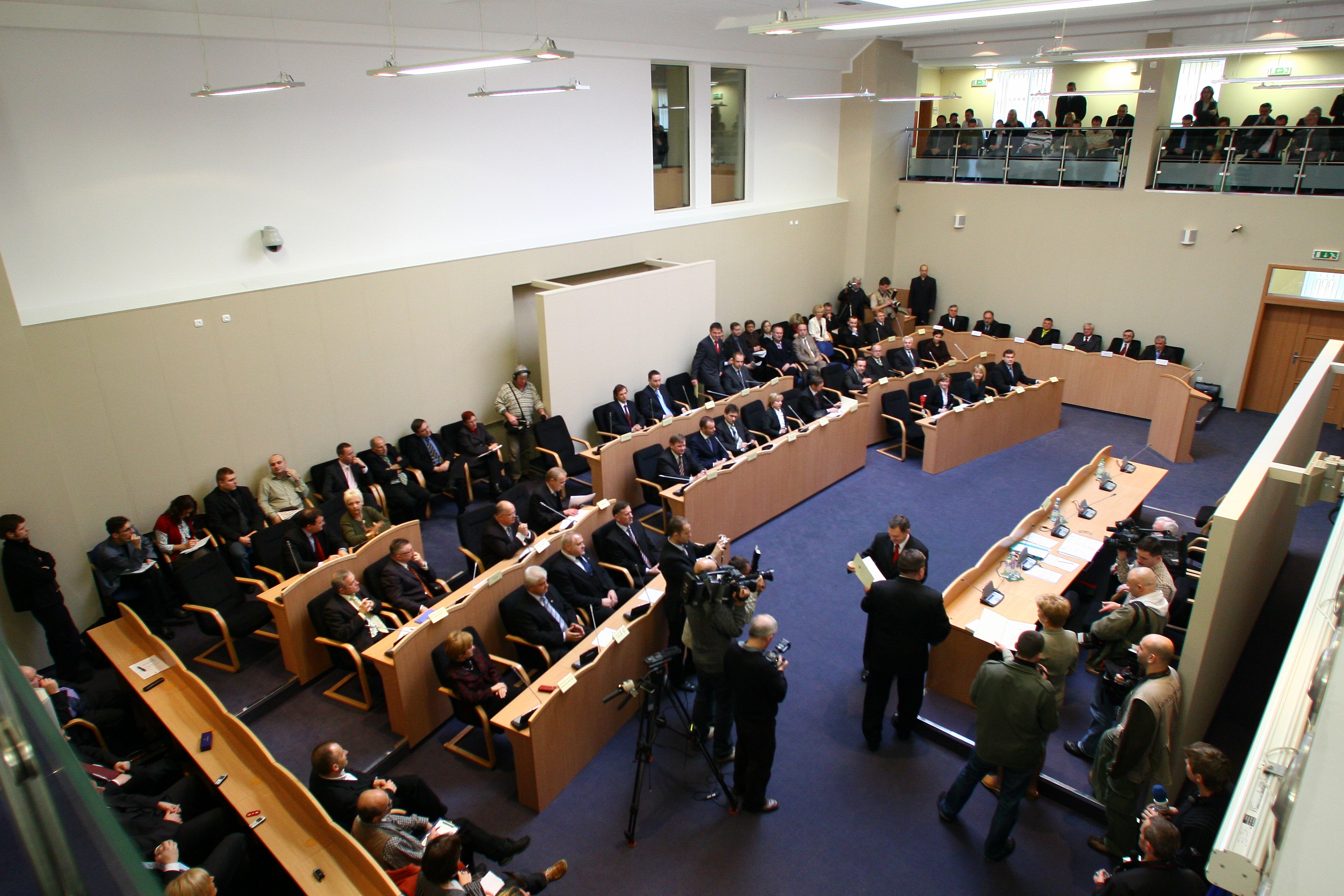
The West Pomeranian Regional Assembly meeting in Szczecin.

A voivodeship sejmik (Polish: sejmik województwa), also known as a provincial or regional assembly, is the regional-level elected legislature for each of the sixteen voivodeships of Poland. Sejmiks are elected to five-year terms, decided during nationwide local elections. The size of the legislative assembly varies for each voivodeship depending on the population, ranging from 30 members in lesser populated provinces to 51 members in the most populous one. Elected representatives of an assembly are known as councillors (radni).

== Origins ==
The word sejmik is a diminutive of sejm, a historical term for an assembly of nobles, and is now the name of the lower house of the Polish National Assembly. The word sejmik was consciously chosen by lawmakers during regional reorganization reforms in the 1990s to eliminate the term rada wojewódzka (voivodeship council), as the definition conjured memories of people's councils during the communist People's Republic of Poland era. Initially, elected regional assemblies were created by the government of Prime Minister Tadeusz Mazowiecki under his administration's decentralization programme, with the regional assemblies acting as advisory bodies to the centrally-appointed voivode. Under the administration of Jerzy Buzek in 1998, the contemporary regional assemblies were created by the Sejm with the reorganization of provincial borders and the devolution of powers to the governments of the new voivodeships.

== Elections ==
Assemblies are elected for a five-year term during nationwide local elections. Similar to nationwide elections for Sejm members, councillors for provincial assemblies are elected from party lists using proportional representation within a five percent voting threshold for each individual voivodeship. Following their election and swearing-in, the councillors of an assembly elect a voivodeship marshal (marszałek województwa) and at most two vice-marshals from among their ranks, who, along with normally two other members, will form an executive board (zarząd województwa). The board acts as the collective executive body of the voivodeship, and is the province's de facto cabinet. The assembly additionally elects a chairman and deputy chairmen from among their ranks, who are tasked in organizing the assembly's business and presiding over debates. If the assembly fails to elect an executive board within three months following an election, the legislature must dissolve itself and the voivodeship is obliged to call another election. Earlier elections can also be approved in the event of a public referendum or if the Sejm has dissolved a regional assembly.

== Powers ==
Provincial assemblies can debate, adopt and pass statutes on matters concerning the province which are not reserved for the administration of the central government. Since the end of the 1990s, the powers of the sejmiks and their respective executive boards have grown. These include matters such as economic development strategies, spatial management plans, managing provincially-controlled rail operators, waste and water management, environmental protection, regional heritage protection, voting on the provincial budget, and appointing a supervisory board to manage voivodeship roads. However, sejmiks are unable to enact provincewide taxes to fund internal policies and projects, and remain dependent on the central government for financing such operations.

Throughout its elected term, the assembly reserves the right to hold the marshal and the executive board accountable for their policies. Assemblies can also dismiss the governing marshal upon a three-fifths majority vote of no confidence, after which results in the collapse of the executive board, and a new marshal and board are chosen. Assemblies do not, on the other hand, have a say in the choice nor dismissal of the centrally-appointed voivode for the province.

Assemblies are assisted by the voivodeship marshal's office (urząd marszałkowski), which provides legal, technical, and bureaucratic services to the body.

== List ==
Sejmik	Location	Number of members	Voivodeship marshal (head of the voivodeship executive board)	Sejmik chairperson
Lower Silesian Voivodeship Sejmik	Wrocław	36	Paweł Gancarz (PSL)	Jerzy Pokój (KO)
Kuyavian-Pomeranian Voivodeship Sejmik	Toruń	30	Piotr Całbecki (KO)	Elżbieta Piniewska (KO)
Lublin Voivodeship Sejmik	Lublin	33	Jarosław Stawiarski (PiS)	Mieczysław Ryba (PiS)
Lubusz Voivodeship Sejmik	Zielona Góra	30	Marcin Jałoński (KO)	Anna Synowiec(KO)
Łódź Voivodeship Sejmik	Łódź	33	Joanna Skrzydlewska (KO)	Małgorzata Grabarczyk (KO)
Lesser Poland Voivodeship Sejmik	Kraków	39	Łukasz Smółka (PiS)	Jan Duda (PiS)
Masovian Voivodeship Sejmik	Warsaw	51	Adam Struzik (PSL)	Ludwik Rakowski (KO)
Opole Voivodeship Sejmik	Opole	30	Szymon Ogłaza (KO)	Rafał Bartek (MN)
Subcarpathian Voivodeship Sejmik	Rzeszów	33	Władysław Ortyl (PiS)	Jerzy Borcz (PiS)
Podlaskie Voivodeship Sejmik	Białystok	30	Łukasz Prokorym (KO)	Cezary Cieślukowski (PSL)
Pomeranian Voivodeship Sejmik	Gdańsk	33	Mieczysław Struk (KO)	Jan Kleinszmidt (KO)
Silesian Voivodeship Sejmik	Katowice	45	Wojciech Saługa (KO)	Jacek Jarco (PL2050)
Świętokrzyskie Voivodeship Sejmik	Kielce	30	Renata Janik (ONRP)	Andrzej Bętkowski (PiS)
Warmian-Masurian Voivodeship Sejmik	Olsztyn	30	Marcin Kuchciński (KO)	Bogdan Bartnicki (TD)
Greater Poland Voivodeship Sejmik	Poznań	39	Marek Woźniak (KO)	Małgorzata Waszak-Klepka (KO)
West Pomeranian Voivodeship Sejmik	Szczecin	30	Olgierd Geblewicz (KO)	Teresa Kalina (KO)

== Current composition (As of the 1st of October 2025) ==
Sejmik	Majority	Law and Justice	Civic Coalition	Third Way	The Left	Confederation & BS	Bezpartyjni Samorządowcy	German Minority	OK Self-Government	Independents
Lower Silesia	TD-BS-KO	6 / 36	15 / 36	4 / 36	1 / 36		3 / 36			7 / 36
Kuyavia-Pomerania	KO-TD	11 / 30	14 / 30	5 / 30						
Lublin	PiS	21 / 33	6 / 33	5 / 33		1 / 33				
Lubusz	KO-TD	10 / 30	14 / 30	6 / 30						
Łódź	KO-TD-L	16 / 33	12 / 33	4 / 33	1 / 33					
Lesser Poland	PiS	21 / 39	12 / 39	6 / 39						
Masovia	KO-PSL	20 / 51	20 / 51	8 / 51	1 / 51	1 / 51				1 / 51
Opole	KO-MN-PSL	10 / 30	14 / 30	1 / 30				5 / 30		
Subcarpathia	PiS	21 / 33	6 / 33	4 / 33		2 / 33				
Podlaskie	KO-TD (Note: Supported by two former Law and Justice councillors: Wiesława Burnos and Marek Malinowski.)	12 / 30	8 / 30	6 / 30		1 / 30				3 / 30
Pomerania	KO	10 / 33	20 / 33	3 / 33						
Silesia	KO-TD-L	18 / 45	20 / 45	5 / 45	2 / 45					
Świętokrzyskie	PiS	16 / 30	6 / 30	7 / 30		1 / 30				
Warmian-Masurian	KO-TD	11 / 30	13 / 30	6 / 30						
Greater Poland	KO-TD-L	15 / 39	15 / 39	7 / 39	2 / 39					
West Pomeranian	KO-TD-L	10 / 30	15 / 30	3 / 30	1 / 30				1 / 30	
Total		228 / 552	210 / 552	80 / 552	8 / 552	6 / 552	3 / 552	5 / 552	1 / 552	11 / 552

== See also ==
- Sejmik
- Sejm
- Voivodeship marshal
- Voivodeship executive board

== Works cited ==
- Council of Europe (2000). Structure and Operation of Local Regional Democracy. Strasbourg: Council of Europe Publishing. ISBN 92-871-4314-5.
- Machnikowski, Piotr, Justyna Balcarczyk, Monika Drela (2011). Contract Law in Poland. Alphen aan den Rijn, The Netherlands: Kluwer Law International. ISBN 978-90-411-3396-0.
- Ochman, Ewa (2013). Post-Communist Poland – Contested Pasts and Future Identitie. Abingdon-on-Thames: Routledge. ISBN 978-0-415-65874-4.
- OECD (2013). Poland: Implementing Strategic-State Capability. OECD Public Governance Reviews. ISBN 978-92-64-20180-4.
- Prokop, Krzysztof (2011). Polish Constitutional Law. Białystok: Temida 2. ISBN 978-83-62813-13-1.
- Regulski, Jerzy (2003). Local Government Reform in Poland: An Insiders Story. Budapest: Open Society Institute. ISBN 963-9419-68-0.
- Surazska, Wisla (1993). "Local Government in Poland: Political Failure and Economic Success". In Edward G. Goetz; Susan E. Clarke (eds.). The New Localism: Comparative Urban Politics in a Global Era. Newbury Park, California: SAGE Publications. ISBN 0-8039-4921-9.
- Tatur, Melanie, ed. (2004). The Making of Regions in Post-Socialist Europe: the Impact of Culture, Economic Structure, and Institutions. Wiesbaden: VS Verlag fuer Sozialwissenschaften. ISBN 3-8100-3813-X.
