= Łukasz Smółka =

Polish politician (born 1982)

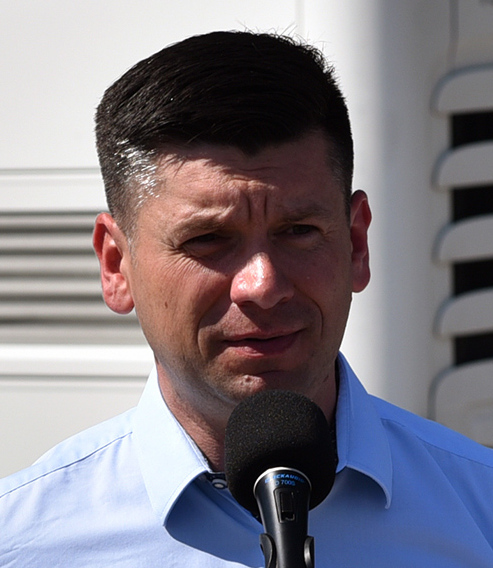
- Smółka in 2022

Marshal of Lesser Poland Voivodeship
- Incumbent
- Assumed office 4 July 2024
- Preceded by: Witold Kozłowski

Personal details
- Born: 1 April 1982 (age 44)
- Party: Law and Justice

Łukasz Smółka (born 1 April 1982) is a Polish politician serving as marshal of Lesser Poland Voivodeship since 2024. He has been a member of the Lesser Poland Voivodeship Sejmik since 2014. From 2018 to 2024, he served as deputy marshal of the voivodeship.

In 2026 appointed to the Council for Local Self-Government under the President of the Republic of Poland
