= Jarosław Stawiarski =

Polish politician (born 1963)

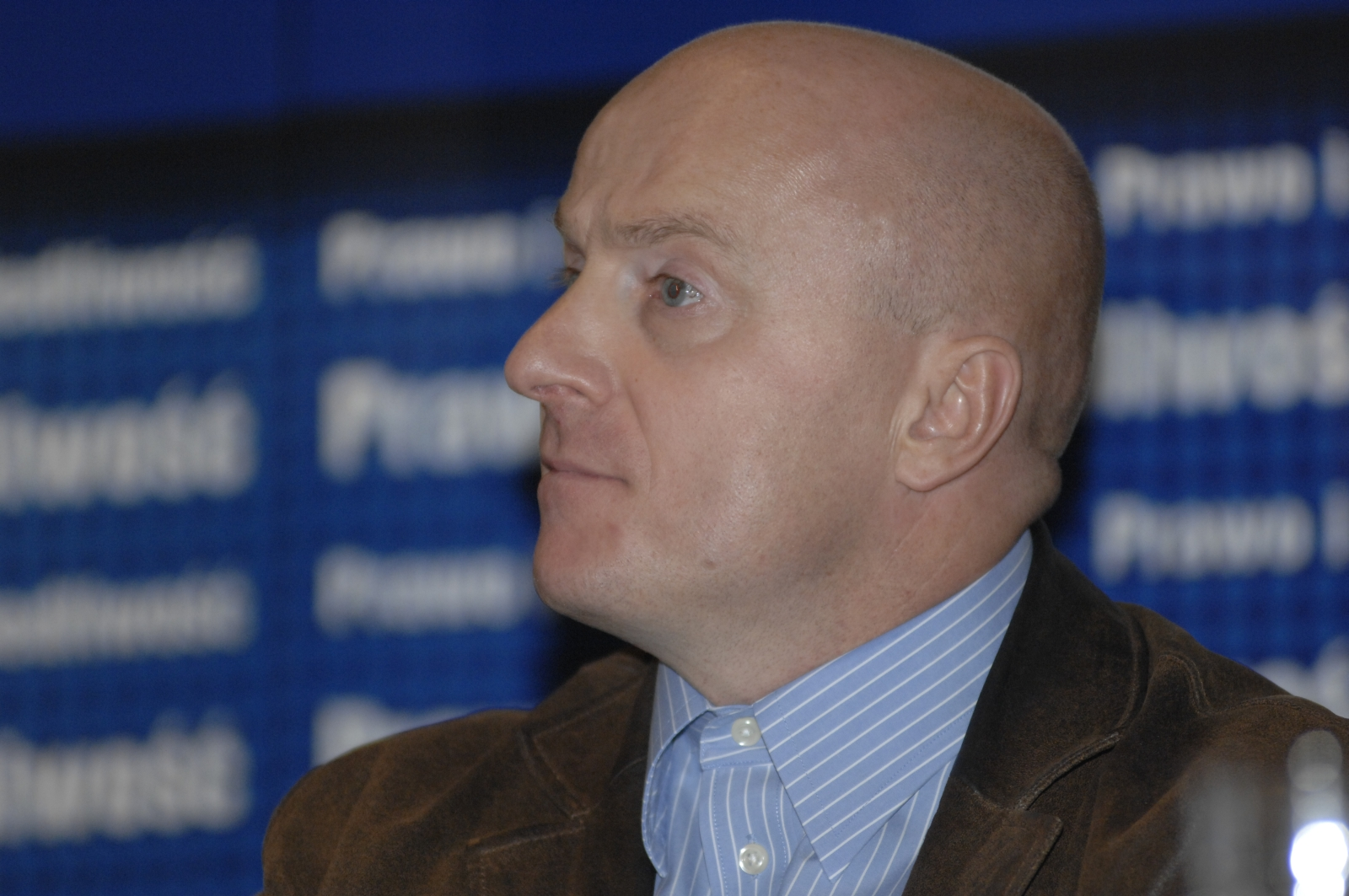

Marshal of the Lublin Voivodeship
- Incumbent
- Assumed office 21 November 2018
- Constituency: 6 – Lublin

Personal details
- Born: 1963 (age 62–63)
- Party: Law and Justice

Jarosław Piotr Stawiarski (born 3 October 1963) is a Polish politician.

Stawiarski was born in Kraśnik. In 1989, he graduated from the Faculty of Humanities at the Maria Curie-Skłodowska University in Lublin in the field of history. In 1997, at the University of Warsaw, he completed post-graduate studies in management, and in 1998, at the Baltic Higher School of Humanities in Koszalin for the management of education and pedagogical supervision.

In 1989, he became a member of the Independent Self-Governing Trade Union "Solidarity". From 1989, he worked as a teacher in schools in Kraśnik: in 1989–1996 in Primary School No. 6, and in 1996–1997 in School Complex No. 3. and beginning in 1997 to 2002, he was the principal of Primary School No. 1 in Kraśnik. From December 2002 to February 2006 he was elected the staroste of Kraśnik District. In the years 1998-2006 he was a member of the poviat council (in 1998 he was elected from the list of Solidarity Electoral Action, and in 2002 from the local electoral committee "Kraśnik 2002"). Until 2005 he was active in the Center Party, he sat in its political council running for the position from the Law and Justice party. On 19 November 2015 he was appointed a Deputy Minister of Sport and Tourism. On 21 November 2018 he was elected the Marshal of the Lublin Voivodeship.

== See also ==
- Members of Polish Sejm 2005-2007
