= Civic Coalition (political alliance) =

Liberal electoral alliance in Poland

Civic Coalition Koalicja Obywatelska
- Abbreviation: KO
- Leaders: Donald Tusk (KO); Michał Suchora (Z); Magdalena Gałkiewicz (Z)
- Founded: 7 March 2018
- Headquarters: ul. Wiejska 12a, 00-490 Warsaw
- Ideology: Liberal conservatism; Christian democracy; Pro-Europeanism
- Political position: Centre to centre-right
- Members: Civic Coalition (KO); The Greens (Zieloni); Supported by: League of Polish Families; AGROunia (AU); Yes! For Poland (T!DPL)
- Colors: Red; Blue; Orange (customary)
- Sejm: 156 / 460 (34%)
- Senate: 43 / 100 (43%)
- European Parliament: 21 / 53 (40%)
- Regional assemblies: 210 / 552 (38%)
- City Presidents: 40 / 107 (37%)

Website
- koalicjaobywatelska.pl

The Civic Coalition (Polish: Koalicja Obywatelska, KO) (Note: The Civic Coalition's name that was used in the 2019 parliamentary election was the "Coalition Electoral Committee Civic Coalition PO .N iPL Greens" (Polish: Koalicyjny Komitet Wyborczy Koalicja Obywatelska PO .N iPL Zieloni).) is a political alliance currently ruling in Poland. The alliance was formed in 2018 around Civic Platform, in opposition to the then-ruling Law and Justice (PiS) party.

== History ==
The Civic Coalition was originally created by the Civic Platform and Modern parties for 2018 local elections. In June 2019, it was announced that the Civic Coalition would be slated to participate in the 2019 Polish parliamentary election and Civic Platform and Modern would form a joint parliamentary club. The Greens announced at the end of July 2019 that they would participate in the elections as part of the Coalition. In August 2019, the Silesian Autonomy Movement and other member organisations of the Silesian Electoral Agreement joined the Coalition.

=== 2018 local elections and present ===
In the 2018 local elections, the Civic Coalition received 26.97% of votes (second place after Law and Justice), winning 194 seats. In 8 voivodeships, it obtained the best result, and in the Pomerania the majority of seats. The coalition fared worse in the powiat and mayoral election. In the first round of 11 candidates of the Civic Coalition won elections for mayors of cities (including Rafał Trzaskowski in Warsaw). In addition, 15 candidates of the Civic Coalition went through to the second round, of which 8 were elected. Candidates of Civic Coalition were elected presidents of 19 cities, while it was placed second to the national-conservative Law and Justice in four.

The committee has shown stronger electoral performances in large cities, such as, Warsaw, Poznań, Gdańsk, Wrocław, Łódź, and Kraków. Better than average results were achieved in West and North Poland (Recovered Territories). In the Opole Voivodeship, Civic Coalition received high support among the German minority. However, it has weaker support in the villages and in the conservative eastern Poland.

In the 2019 parliamentary elections, the Coalition received most of its votes in major cities (as in 2018 local elections) and areas surrounding them. For the 2019 election, the coalition entered an agreement with the Silesian Regional Party and Silesian Autonomy Movement, and activists and politicians associated with these Silesian parties were included on the Civic Coalition's electoral lists. The electoral pact between the Civic Coalition and Silesian regionalists declared three demands – the strengthening of regional government, an increase in the share of tax revenues allocated to local governments, and the recognition of Silesian language as a regional language.

Civic Platform already cooperated with the Silesian Autonomy Movement on a local level – in 2015, both parties entered a local coalition in the Silesian Voivodeship Sejmik. In March 2023, Civic Coalition again pledged to recognize Silesian as a regional language.

After exit polls for the 2023 parliamentary elections showed KO having taken a strong enough second-place finish to oust the ruling Law and Justice party, KO leader Donald Tusk said, "I have been a politician for many years. I'm an athlete. Never in my life have I been so happy about taking seemingly second place. Poland won. Democracy has won." This is the largest part of the 15 October Coalition.

On 25 October 2025, the three main components of the coalition, Civic Platform, Modern, and Polish Initiative, merged into a new party. It was announced that this party would itself be named Civic Coalition.

== Ideology ==
The Civic Coalition presents itself as a coalition of centrist, moderately left-wing and moderately right-wing forces. Shortly after its foundation, media outlets variously described the party as centre-left, centrist, and centre-right. After the 2023 Polish parliamentary election, the coalition came to be described as centre-right by The Guardian, Euractiv, EUobserver, The Daily Telegraph, Heinrich Böll Foundation, and the Financial Times. Afterwards, it has been consistently described as centre-right by political scientists and other academics.

The coalition's positions on social issues range from progressivism to Christian democracy. It is mainly oriented towards the principles of liberal conservatism, liberalism, or right-wing liberalism. It aims to protect liberal democracy in Poland. The Civic Coalition was initially led by the Civic Platform, which was described as a "right-to-center-right, economically and socially liberal" party by Polish public broadcaster Telewizja Polska. The coalition was also described as anti-immigration, mostly because of the rhetoric of Civic Platform. Civic Coalition's economic policies have been described as neoliberal. KO supports Poland's membership in the European Union and NATO.

On social issues, the Civic Coalition generally supports abortion and contraception, and proposes legal partnerships for same-sex couples. Economically, its main postulates are cutting taxes and simplifying the tax system. The Civic Coalition declares its commitment to supporting entrepreneurs, and advocates reducing public debt, banning state borrowing depending on the economic condition, and lifting the trade ban on Sundays. In foreign policy, the alliance is very supportive of the European Union, and advocates close cooperation with Germany and France. It supports European integration, and postulated federalization of some EU spheres, such as introducing a common European health policy. It combines elements of liberalism and conservatism, representing liberal conservatism.

== Composition ==
| Name | Ideology | Position | European affiliation | Leader(s) | MPs | Senators | MEPs | Sejmiks |
|---|---|---|---|---|---|---|---|---|
| Civic Coalition | Liberal conservatism | Centre-right | EPP | Donald Tusk | 138 / 460 | 36 / 100 | 19 / 53 | 159 / 552 |
| The Greens | Green politics | Centre-left | EGP | Przemysław Słowik; Urszula Zielińska | 2 / 460 | 0 / 100 | 0 / 53 | 1 / 552 |
| Independents | —N/a | | | | 20 / 460 | 0 / 100 | 2 / 53 | 8 / 552 (Note: Roman Jasiakiewicz (Kuyavia-Pomerania), Iwona Jelonek (Silesia), Marek Kopel (Silesia), Igor Łukaszuk (Podlaskie), Antoni Pikul (Podlaskie), Tadeusz Sławek (Silesia), Anna Synowiec (Lubusz), Henryk Szymański (Greater Poland)) |

=== Support ===
| Name | Ideology | Position | European affiliation | Leader(s) | MPs | Senators | MEPs | Sejmiks |
|---|---|---|---|---|---|---|---|---|
| League of Polish Families | Social conservatism | Right-wing | —N/a | Witold Bałażak | 0 / 460 | 0 / 100 | 0 / 53 | 0 / 552 |
| AGROunia | Agrarian socialism | Left-wing | —N/a | Michał Kołodziejczak | 1 / 460 | 0 / 100 | 0 / 53 | 0 / 552 |
| Yes! For Poland | Regionalism | Centre-left | —N/a | Rafał Trzaskowski | 2 / 460 | 1 / 100 | 0 / 53 | 4 / 552 |

== Election results ==
=== Presidential ===
| Election | Candidate | 1st round | | 2nd round | | Result |
| Election | Candidate | Votes | % | Votes | % | Result |
|---|---|---|---|---|---|---|
| 2020 | Rafał Trzaskowski | 5,917,340 | 30.46 | 10,018,263 | 48.97 | Lost to Andrzej Duda |
| 2025 | Rafał Trzaskowski | 6,147,797 | 31.36 | 10,237,286 | 49.11 | Lost to Karol Nawrocki |

=== Sejm ===
Party groupings, who received most votes in powiats (Civic Coalition in orange) in 2023

| Election | Leader | Popular vote | % of vote | Seats | Seat change | Government |
|---|---|---|---|---|---|---|
| 2019 | Grzegorz Schetyna | 5,060,355 | 27.4 (#2) | 134 / 460 | New | PiS |
| 2023 | Donald Tusk | 6,629,402 | 30.7 (#2) | 157 / 460 | ▲23 | PiS Minority (2023) |
| 2023 | Donald Tusk | 6,629,402 | 30.7 (#2) | 157 / 460 | ▲23 | KO–PL2050–KP–NL (2023–2026) |
| 2023 | Donald Tusk | 6,629,402 | 30.7 (#2) | 157 / 460 | ▲23 | KO–KP–NL–PL2050–C (2026–present) |

=== Senate ===
| Election | Leader | Popular vote | % of vote | Seats | Seat change | Majority |
|---|---|---|---|---|---|---|
| 2019 | Grzegorz Schetyna | 6,490,306 | 35.66 (#2) | 43 / 100 | ▲17 | KO–KP–SLD |
| 2023 | Donald Tusk | 6,187,295 | 28.91 (#2) | 41 / 100 | ▼2 | KO–PL2050–KP–NL |

=== European Parliament ===
2024 elections to the European parliament (constituencies) PiS (blue), KO (orange)

| Election | Leader | Popular vote | % of vote | Seats | Seat change | EP Group |
|---|---|---|---|---|---|---|
| 2019 | Grzegorz Schetyna | 5,249,935 | 38.47 (#2) | 14 / 52 | New | EPP |
| 2019 | As part of the European Coalition, which won 22 seats in total. | | | | | |
| 2024 | Donald Tusk | 4,359,443 | 37.06 (#1) | 21 / 53 | ▲7 | EPP |

=== 2018 local elections ===
2018 Polish local elections to regional assemblies (voivodeships) PiS (blue), KO (orange)

| Voivodeship | Seats | Seat change | Governance |
|---|---|---|---|
| Lower Silesian | 13 / 36 | ▼3 | Opposition (2018–2024) |
| Lower Silesian | 13 / 36 | ▼3 | Coalition (2024–) |
| Kuyavian-Pomeranian | 14 / 30 | 0 | Coalition |
| Lublin | 7 / 33 | 0 | Opposition |
| Lubusz | 11 / 30 | ▲1 | Coalition |
| Łódź | 12 / 33 | ▲2 | Opposition |
| Lesser Poland | 11 / 39 | ▼3 | Opposition |
| Masovian | 18 / 51 | ▲3 | Coalition |
| Opole | 13 / 30 | ▲4 | Coalition |
| Subcarpathian | 5 / 33 | 0 | Opposition |
| Podlaskie | 9 / 30 | ▲1 | Opposition |
| Pomeranian | 18 / 33 | ▲1 | Coalition |
| Silesian | 20 / 45 | ▲3 | Opposition (2018–2022) |
| Silesian | 20 / 45 | ▲3 | Coalition (2022–) |
| Świętokrzyskie | 3 / 30 | 0 | Opposition (2018–2023) |
| Świętokrzyskie | 3 / 30 | 0 | Coalition (2023–) |
| Warmian-Masurian | 12 / 30 | ▲3 | Coalition |
| Greater Poland | 15 / 39 | ▲2 | Coalition |
| West Pomeranian | 13 / 30 | ▲1 | Coalition |
| All seats | 194 / 552 | ▲15 | 8 / 16 |

=== 2024 local elections ===
2024 Polish local elections to regional assemblies (constituencies) PiS (blue), KO (orange)

| Voivodeship | Seats | Seat change | Governance |
|---|---|---|---|
| Lower Silesian | 15 / 36 | ▲2 | Coalition |
| Kuyavian-Pomeranian | 14 / 30 | 0 | Coalition |
| Lublin | 6 / 33 | ▼1 | Opposition |
| Lubusz | 14 / 30 | ▲3 | Coalition |
| Łódź | 12 / 33 | 0 | Coalition |
| Lesser Poland | 12 / 39 | ▲1 | Opposition |
| Masovian | 20 / 51 | ▲2 | Coalition |
| Opole | 14 / 30 | ▲1 | Coalition |
| Subcarpathian | 6 / 33 | ▲1 | Opposition |
| Podlaskie | 8 / 30 | ▼1 | Coalition |
| Pomeranian | 20 / 33 | ▲2 | Majority |
| Silesian | 20 / 45 | 0 | Coalition |
| Świętokrzyskie | 6 / 30 | ▲3 | Opposition |
| Warmian-Masurian | 13 / 30 | ▲1 | Coalition |
| Greater Poland | 15 / 39 | 0 | Coalition |
| West Pomeranian | 15 / 30 | ▲2 | Coalition |
| All seats | 210 / 552 | ▲16 | 12 / 16 |

== See also ==
- European Coalition
- Polish Coalition
- Third Cabinet of Donald Tusk
- 15 October Coalition
- Senate Pact 2023
