= Law and Justice =

Right-wing nationalist and illiberal political party in Poland

Law and Justice Prawo i Sprawiedliwość
- Abbreviation: PiS
- Chairman: Jarosław Kaczyński
- Founders: Lech Kaczyński; Jarosław Kaczyński
- Founded: 13 June 2001; 25 years ago
- Split from: Solidarity Electoral Action
- Preceded by: Centre Agreement
- Headquarters: ul. Nowogrodzka 84/86, 02-018 Warsaw
- Youth wing: Law and Justice Youth Forum
- Membership: 48,000 (2025 est.)
- Ideology: National conservatism; Paternalistic conservatism; Right-wing populism; Illiberalism
- Political position: Right-wing (Note: The party is considered economic left-wing, or left-leaning economically.)
- Religion: Roman Catholicism
- National affiliation: United Right
- European affiliation: European Conservatives and Reformists Party (since 2009) (Note: Previously the party was part of the AEN (until 2009))
- European Parliament group: European Conservatives and Reformists Group (since 2009) (Note: Previously the party was part of the UEN (2004-2009))
- Colours: Blue White Red; Cyan (Note: Between 2001 and 2005)
- Sejm: 141 / 460
- Senate: 31 / 100
- European Parliament: 20 / 53
- Regional assemblies: 226 / 552
- Voivodes: 0 / 16
- Voivodeship Marshals: 3 / 16
- City Presidents: 4 / 107

Website
- pis.org.pl

Law and Justice (Note: Sometimes also called Right and Justice in English) (Polish: Prawo i Sprawiedliwość, (Note: [ˈpravɔ i ˌspravjɛˈdlivɔɕt͡ɕ]) PiS) (Note: Polish pronunciation: [ˈpis] PEACE) is a right-wing populist illiberal and national-conservative political party in Poland. The party is a member of European Conservatives and Reformists Group. Its chairman is Jarosław Kaczyński, since 18 January 2003.

PiS was founded in 2001 by Jarosław and Lech Kaczyński as a direct successor of the Centre Agreement after it split from the Solidarity Electoral Action (AWS). Despite a poor showing in the 2001 parliamentary election, where it came 4th, PiS won the 2005 presidential and parliamentary elections and formed the Marcinkiewicz and Kaczyński governments. The governments included coalition ministers from the League of Polish Families and Self-Defence before collapsing in 2007. The rival Civic Platform (PO) emerged victorious in the 2007 snap election and formed a coalition with the Polish People's Party, which served two terms, retaining a majority in the 2011 parliamentary election. PiS lost the presidency following the death of president Lech Kaczyński and administration officials in the Smolensk air disaster — acting president Bronisław Komorowski of PO was elected to the presidency in 2010, winning against Jarosław Kaczyński in the second round.

Law and Justice concluded its period in opposition when it won an upset victory in the 2015 presidential election and an outright majority of seats in the 2015 parliamentary election, retaining its majority in 2019 and the presidency in 2020. It governed for eight years, forming the Szydło and Morawiecki (Note: First cabinet of Mateusz Morawiecki, Second cabinet of Mateusz Morawiecki, Third Cabinet of Mateusz Morawiecki) cabinets, until losing its parliamentary majority in 2023 and returning to opposition despite winning the highest number of seats. The party's candidate, Karol Nawrocki, scored another upset victory in the 2025 Polish presidential election. Law and Justice remained the largest party in the Sejm until 2026, when former Prime Minister Mateusz Morawiecki and his followers broke away to form the Development Plus party.

During its foundation, it sought to position itself as a centrist and Christian-democratic party, although shortly after, it adopted more culturally and socially conservative views and began their shift to the right. Under Kaczyński's national-conservative and law-and-order agenda, PiS embraced economic interventionism. During the 2010s, it also adopted right-wing populist positions. Comparative political research has documented the party's subsequent shift towards the far right. After regaining power in 2015, PiS gained popularity with more populist and social policies. It has also pursued close relations with the Catholic Church. The party is also described as "left-paternalistic", and left-conservative.

It is a member of the European Conservatives and Reformists, and on national-level it heads the United Right coalition. It has been accused of authoritarianism and contributing to democratic backsliding, and attracted widespread international criticism and domestic protest movements.

== History ==
=== Formation ===
The party was created on a wave of popularity gained by Lech Kaczyński while heading the Polish Ministry of Justice (June 2000 to July 2001) in the AWS-led government, although local committees began appearing from 22 March 2001. The AWS itself was created from a diverse array of many small political parties. In the 2001 general election, PiS gained 44 (of 460) seats in the lower chamber of the Polish Parliament (Sejm) with 9.5% of votes. In 2002, Lech Kaczyński was elected mayor of Warsaw. He handed the party leadership to his twin brother Jarosław in 2003.

=== In coalition government: 2005–2007 ===
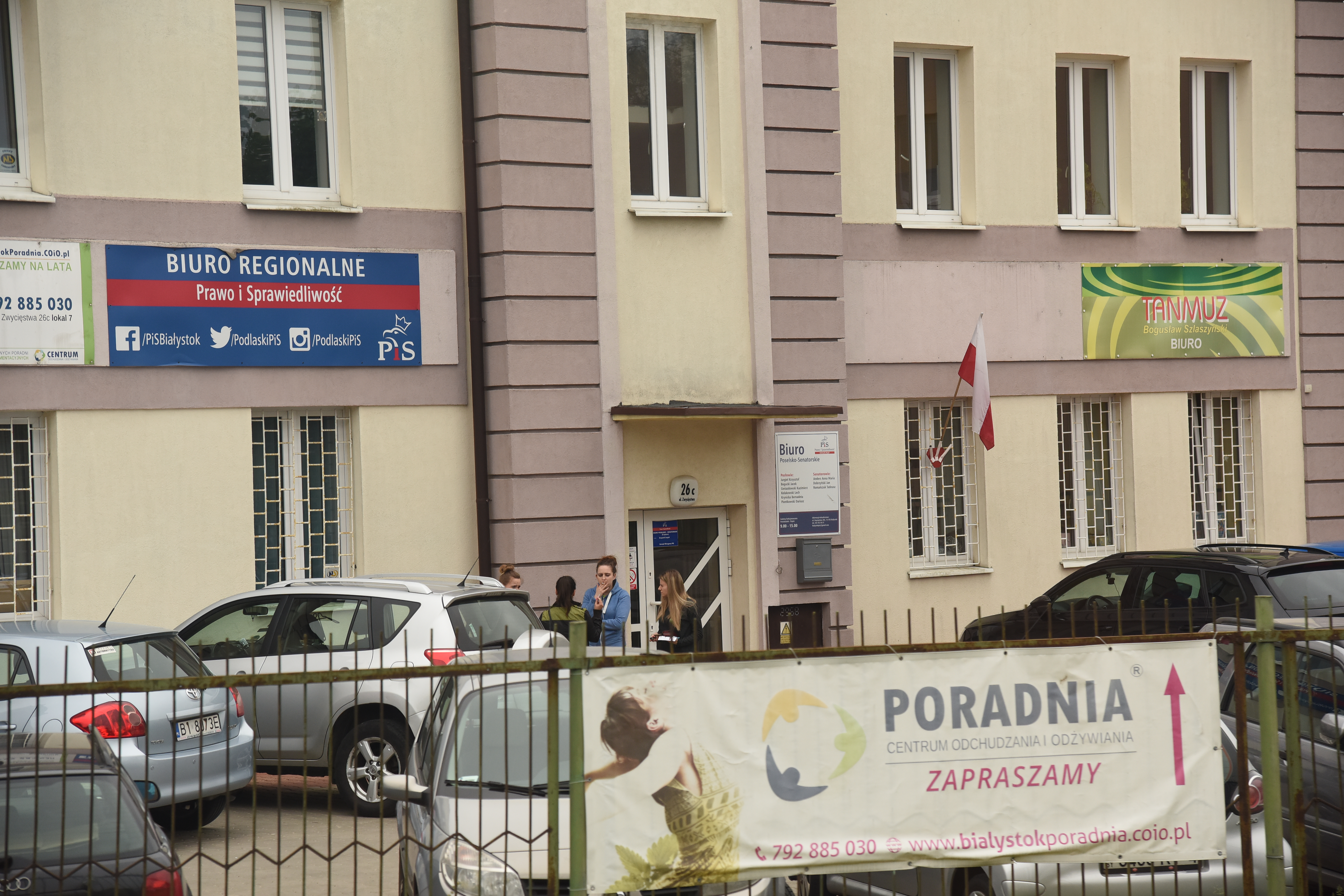
Former regional office of PiS in Zwycięstwa Street in Antoniuk District of Białystok, May 2019

In the 2005 general election, PiS took first place with 27.0% of votes, which gave it 155 out of 460 seats in the Sejm and 49 out of 100 seats in the Senate. It was almost universally expected that the two largest parties, PiS and Civic Platform (PO), would form a coalition government. The putative coalition parties had a falling out, however, related to a fierce contest for the Polish presidency. In the end, Lech Kaczyński won the second round of the presidential election on 23 October 2005 with 54.0% of the vote, ahead of Donald Tusk, the PO candidate.

After the 2005 elections, Jarosław should have become prime minister. However, in order to improve his brother's chances of winning the presidential election (the first round of which was scheduled two weeks after the parliamentary election), PiS formed a minority government headed by Kazimierz Marcinkiewicz as prime minister, an arrangement that eventually turned out to be unworkable. In July 2006, PiS formed a coalition government with the agrarian populist Self-Defence of the Republic of Poland and the nationalist League of Polish Families, headed by Jarosław Kaczyński. In September 2006 the coalition was abruptly ended after the leftist Samoobrona protested Kaczyński's decision to send additional Polish troops to Afghanistan. PiS faced a threat of early election and sought to replace Samoobrona with the Polish People's Party. However, after a senior aide of Kaczyński was filmed secretly trying to bribe a Samoobrona MP to defect to PiS, Jarosław Kalinowski, the leader of the Polish People's Party, accused PiS of corruption and ruled out a coalition. Later, in October 2006, PiS was able to restore its coalition government with Samoobrona and LPR, and defeat the motion for early elections.

In the 2006 Polish local elections that took place in November 2006, PiS narrowly lost the contest for the first place with Civic Platform. However, the coalition partners of Law and Justice, Samoobrona and LPR, lost roughly two-thirds of their supports in the elections, questioning the stability of the coalition. The coalition collapsed after Lepper was dismissed from his position as Deputy Prime Minister on 9 July 2007 over suspicions that he was involved in a corruption scandal. It was then claimed that the Central Anticorruption Bureau (accused of being led by PiS) organized a sting operation against Lepper; PiS dismissed all of their ministers from the government after the affair, effectively ending the coalition. On 6 September 2007, the Sejm was dissolved and the 2007 snap election was called.

=== In opposition: 2007–2015 ===
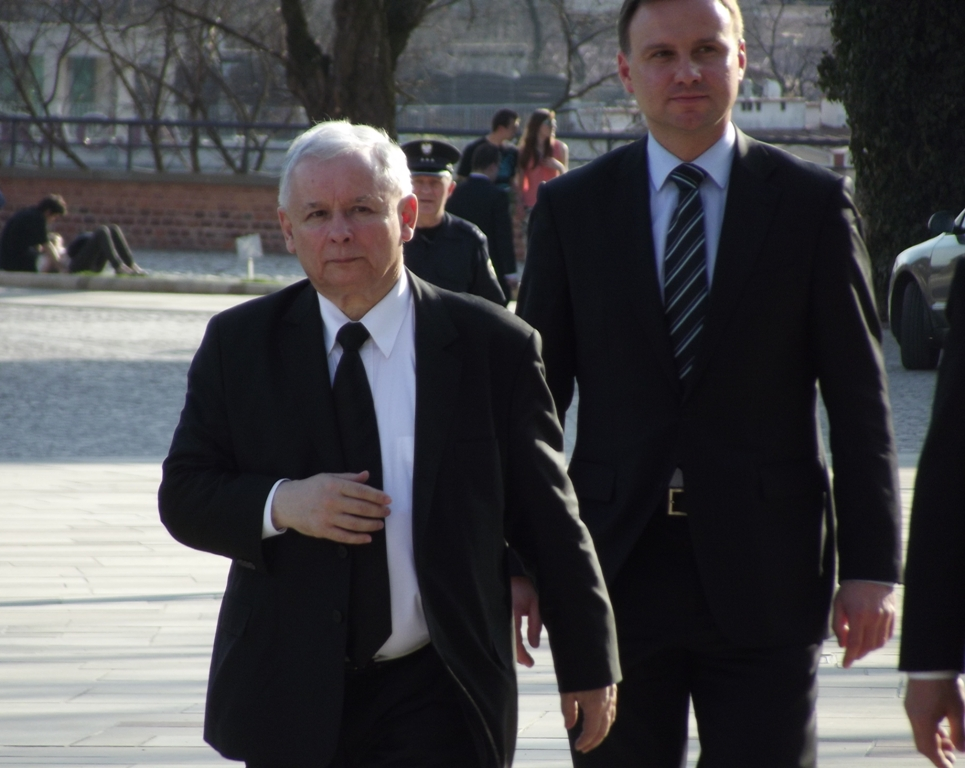
Jarosław Kaczyński and Andrzej Duda, 18 April 2013

In the 2007 general election, PiS managed to secure 32.1% of votes. Although an improvement over its showing from 2005, the results were nevertheless a defeat for the party, as Civic Platform (PO) gathered 41.5%. The party won 166 out of 460 seats in the Sejm and 39 seats in Poland's Senate. The two partners of PiS from the 2006-2007, Samoobrona and LPR, fell below 5% and lost all theirs seats, despite polling around 5% shortly before the election. In 2009, the government coalition led by Civic Platform and Polish People's Party charged Mariusz Kamiński, the head of the Central Anticorruption Bureau, with abuse of power in connection to the sting operation against Lepper.

On 10 April 2010, its former leader Lech Kaczyński died in the 2010 Polish Air Force Tu-154 crash. Jarosław Kaczyński became the sole leader of the party. He was the presidential candidate in the 2010 elections. In the 2010 election, Jarosław gathered 46.99% of the vote, losing to Civic Platform candidate Bronislaw Komorowski, who won with 53.01%.

=== In majority government: 2015–2023 ===
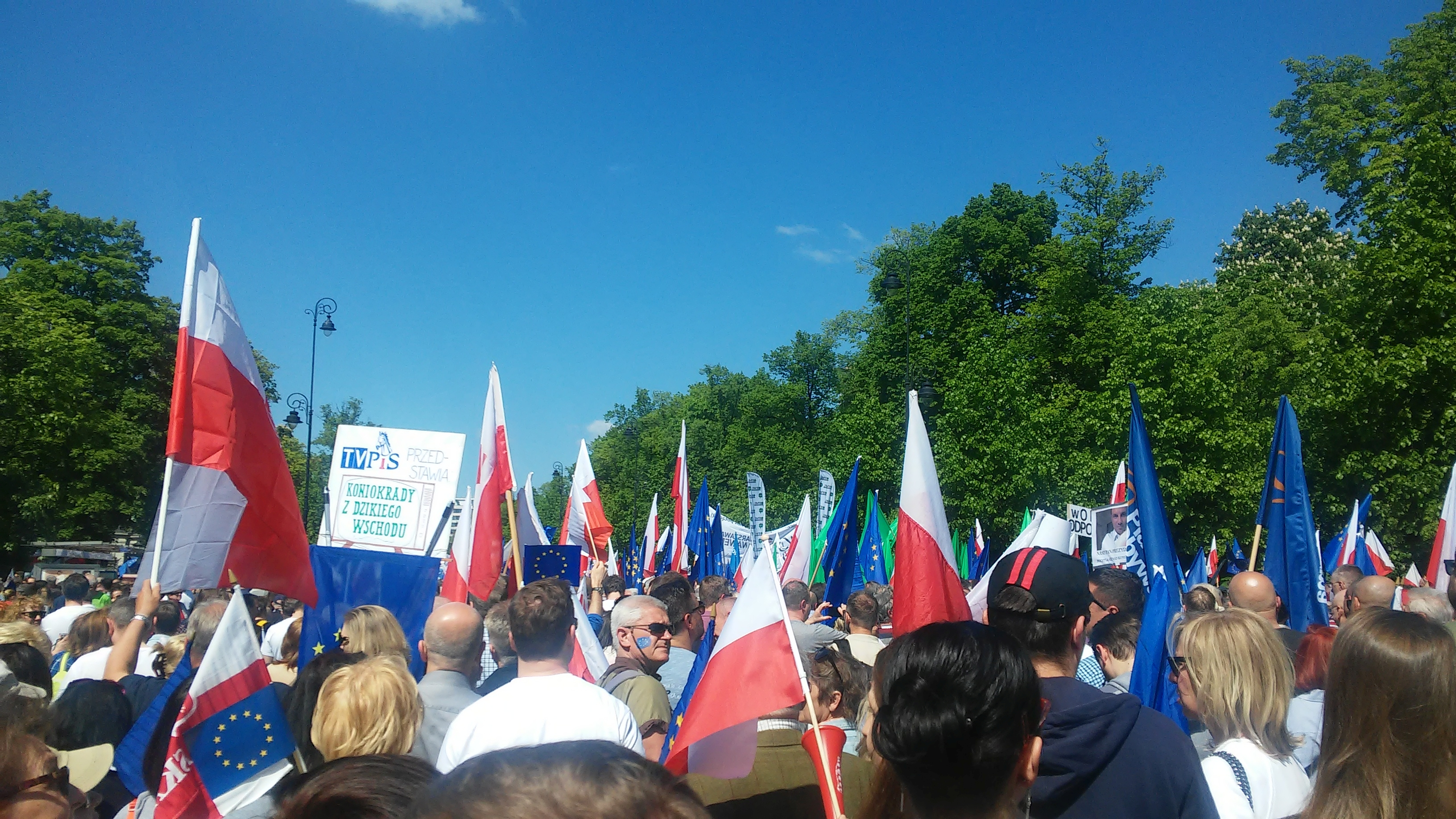
A Committee for the Defence of Democracy demonstration in Warsaw against the ruling Law and Justice party, on 7 May 2016

The party won the 2015 parliamentary election, this time with an outright majority—something no Polish party had done since the fall of communism. In the normal course of events, this should have made Jarosław Kaczyński prime minister for a second time. However, Beata Szydło, perceived as being somewhat more moderate than Kaczyński, had been tapped as PiS's candidate for prime minister.

The party supported controversial reforms carried out by the Hungarian Fidesz party, with Jarosław Kaczyński declaring in 2011 that "a day will come when we have a Budapest in Warsaw". PiS's 2015 victory prompted creation of a cross-party opposition movement, the Committee for the Defence of Democracy (KOD). Law and Justice has Proposed 2017 judicial reforms, which according to the party were meant to improve efficiency of the justice system, sparked protest as they were seen as undermining judicial independence. While these reforms were initially unexpectedly vetoed by President Duda, he later signed them into law. In 2017, the European Union began an Article 7 infringement procedure against Poland due to a "clear risk of a serious breach" in the rule of law and fundamental values of the European Union.

The party has caused what constitutional law scholar Wojciech Sadurski termed a "constitutional breakdown" by packing the Constitutional Court with its supporters, undermining parliamentary procedure, and reducing the president's and prime minister's offices in favour of power being wielded extra-constitutionally by party leader Jarosław Kaczyński. After eliminating constitutional checks, the government then moved to curtail the activities of NGOs and independent media, restrict freedom of speech and assembly, and reduce the qualifications required for civil service jobs in order to fill these positions with party loyalists. The media law was changed to give the governing party control of the state media, which was turned into a partisan outlet, with dissenting journalists fired from their jobs. Due to these political changes, Poland has been termed an "illiberal democracy", "plebiscitarian authoritarianism", or "velvet dictatorship with a façade of democracy".

The party won reelection in the 2019 parliamentary election. With 44% of the popular vote, Law and Justice received the highest vote share by any party since Poland returned to democracy in 1989, but lost its majority in the Senate.

=== In opposition: 2023–present ===
The United Right alliance placed first for the third straight election and won a plurality of seats but fell short of a Sejm majority. The opposition, consisting of the Civic Coalition, Third Way, and The Left, achieved a combined total vote of 54%, managing to form a majority coalition government. Although PiS would be unable to govern on its own, the Polish president Andrzej Duda stated his intention to re-appoint the incumbent Mateusz Morawiecki as prime minister due to the existing albeit unofficial convention of nominating a member of the winning party. The four opposition parties criticized Duda's decision as a delay tactic. The opposition parties subsequently signed a coalition agreement on 10 November, de facto taking over control of the Sejm, and agreed to nominate former prime minister and European Council President Donald Tusk as their candidate. Morawiecki's new cabinet, dubbed "two-week government" and "zombie government" by the media due to its anticipated short-livedness, was sworn in on 27 November 2023. As expected, the Morawiecki's government was defeated in the Sejm on 11 December 2023, effectively ending its tenure.

The party's endorsed candidate, Karol Nawrocki, won the 2025 Polish presidential election in an upset victory.

On 7 March 2026, Przemysław Czarnek was named as the party's candidate for the office of Prime Minister for the Next Polish parliamentary election. Following Czarnek's nomination as the party's Prime Ministerial candidate as well as internal party tension, the Scouts faction, led by former Prime Minister Mateusz Morawiecki, broke away to form Development Plus.

==== 2024 party subsidy issue ====
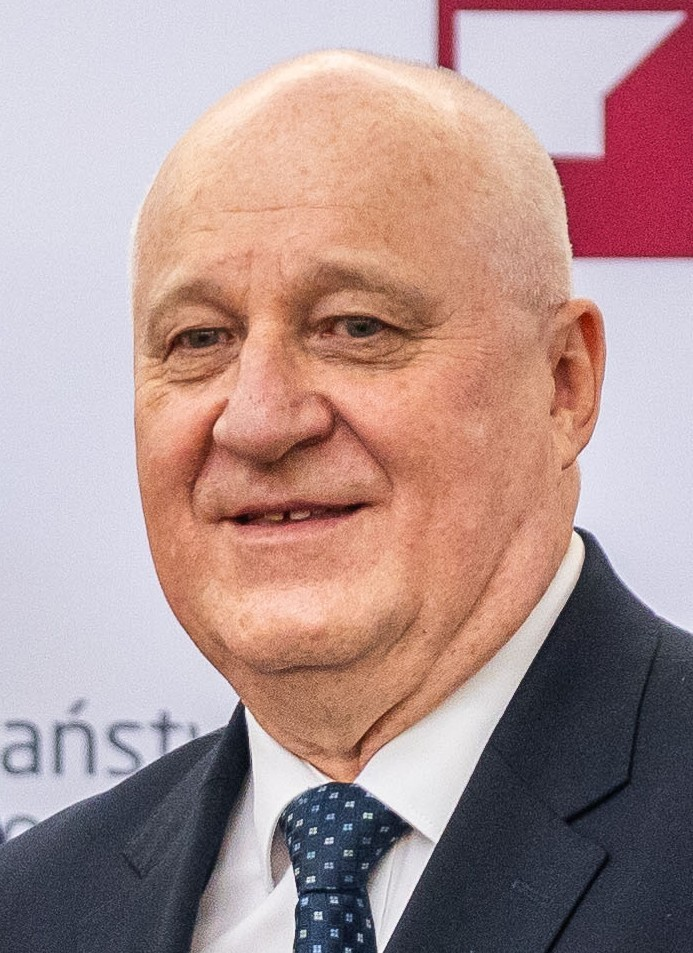
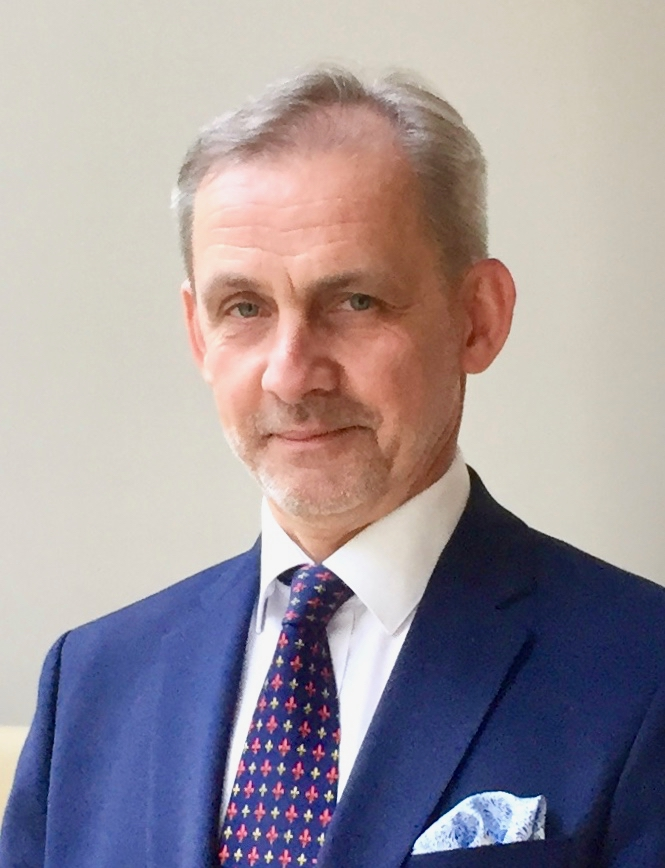
Sylwester Marciniak (left) and Wojciech Sych (right)

On 14 March 2024, the President appointed a new composition of the National Electoral Commission (PKW), selected by the Sejm in December 2023. While Sylwester Marciniak remained the chairman of the PKW, a position he held since 11 February 2020 and Wojciech Sych as his deputy, seven other members were recommended by different parties in parliament: KO recommended Konrad Składowski and Ryszard Balicki, PiS recommended Mirosław Suski and Arkadiusz Pikulik, PSL recommended Maciej Kliś, PL2050 recommended Paweł Gieras, and Lewica recommended Ryszard Kalisz.

On 29 August, the PKW ruled 5:3 to penalize PiS by refusing to return 10.8 million PLN for 36 million designated to it via party subsidy, alleging the party misused 3.6 million PLN of their provided campaign funds in the 2023 parliamentary election. Despite PiS appealing the decision to the Supreme Court, the Supreme Court issued no verdict within the 60-day deadline. The party appealed to its members and supporters for financial aid in donations. The PKW tied in a vote on 23 September regarding whether the committee recognizes the Supreme Court as valid considering the ongoing constitutional crisis. Further penalizations by the PKW on 18 November occurred thereafter, with the Commission ruling 5:4 to deprive PiS of its entire 75 million PLN subsidy for the three next years. PiS likewise appealed this decision to the Supreme Court, which the Supreme Court ruled invalid on 11 December, obligating the PKW to return PiS its subsidy. The Commission voted 5:4 to adjourn the meeting on 16 December without recognizing the Supreme Court or its ruling. On 30 December, a re-vote was held on the matter of whether it recognizes the Supreme Court, ruling 4:3 in favor of recognizing its verdict on this matter, and accepting the Supreme Court's decision to return the funds to PiS. Subsequently, the matter was relayed to the Ministry of Finance, in charge of granting subsidies.

In reaction to the ruling, several politicians commented. Prime Minister Donald Tusk stated on X that he does not recognize the PKW positively ruling on granting PiS its subsidy. Marshal of the Sejm Szymon Hołownia stated the need for a compromise that lets Poles decide on a President without the validity of the president-elect's mandate being disputed by different parties. On 8 January 2025 Minister of Finance Andrzej Domański refused to recognize the PKW's ruling affirming PiS is to be granted its subsidy, stating the verdict was written in a "self-contradictory" way. Sylwester Marciniak, the PKW chairman, responded by stating the verdict was written clearly and demanding the Ministry grant PiS its allotted funds. Prime Minister Tusk expressed doubt over the legal validity of the PKW verdict, defending his Minister. A poll suggests 47.1% of Poles (98% of PiS voters, 71% of TD voters, 53% of Lewica voters) support PiS receiving the funds, and 46.9% (85% of PO voters, 80% of Konfederacja voters) are against.

Party (Note: Party that recommended the member to the PKW)	PKW member	Ruling				
Party	PKW member	29 August	23 September	18 November	16 December	30 December
Independent	Sylwester Marciniak	Abstained	For	Unknown	Against	For
Independent	Wojciech Sych	Against	Unknown	Unknown	Against	For
KO	Konrad Składkowski	For	Unknown	Unknown	For	Abstained
KO	Ryszard Balicki	For	Unknown	Unknown	For	Abstained
PiS	Mirosław Suski	Against	Unknown	Unknown	Against	For
PiS	Arkadiusz Pikulik	Against	Unknown	Unknown	Against	For
PSL	Maciej Kliś	For	Unknown	Unknown	For	Against
PL2050	Paweł Gieras	For	Unknown	Unknown	For	Against
Left	Ryszard Kalisz	For	Unknown	Unknown	For	Against
Total		5:3	4:4	5:4	5:4	4:3

=== Breakaways ===
In January 2010, a breakaway faction led by Jerzy Polaczek split from the party to form Poland Plus. Its seven members of the Sejm came from the centrist, economically liberal wing of the party. On 24 September 2010, the group was disbanded, with most of its Sejm members, including Polaczek, returning to Law and Justice.

On 16 November 2010, MPs Joanna Kluzik-Rostkowska, Elżbieta Jakubiak and Paweł Poncyljusz, and MEPs Adam Bielan and Michał Kamiński formed a new political group, Poland Comes First (Polska jest Najważniejsza). Kamiński claimed that the Law and Justice party had been taken over by far-right extremists. The breakaway party formed following dissatisfaction with the direction and leadership of Kaczyński.

On 4 November 2011, MEPs Zbigniew Ziobro, Jacek Kurski, and Tadeusz Cymański were ejected from the party, after Ziobro urged the party to split further into two separate parties – centrist and nationalist – with the three representing the nationalist faction. Ziobro's supporters, most of whom were on the right wing of the party, formed a new group in Parliament called Solidary Poland, leading to their expulsion, too. United Poland was formed as a formally separate party in March 2012, but has not threatened Law and Justice in opinion polls.

United Poland which would later become Sovereign Poland merged with Law and Justice on 12 October 2024 during PiS congress in Przysucha.

== Base of support ==
Law and Justice's main support (dark blue). PiS has seen decreased support in the 2023 Polish parliamentary election.

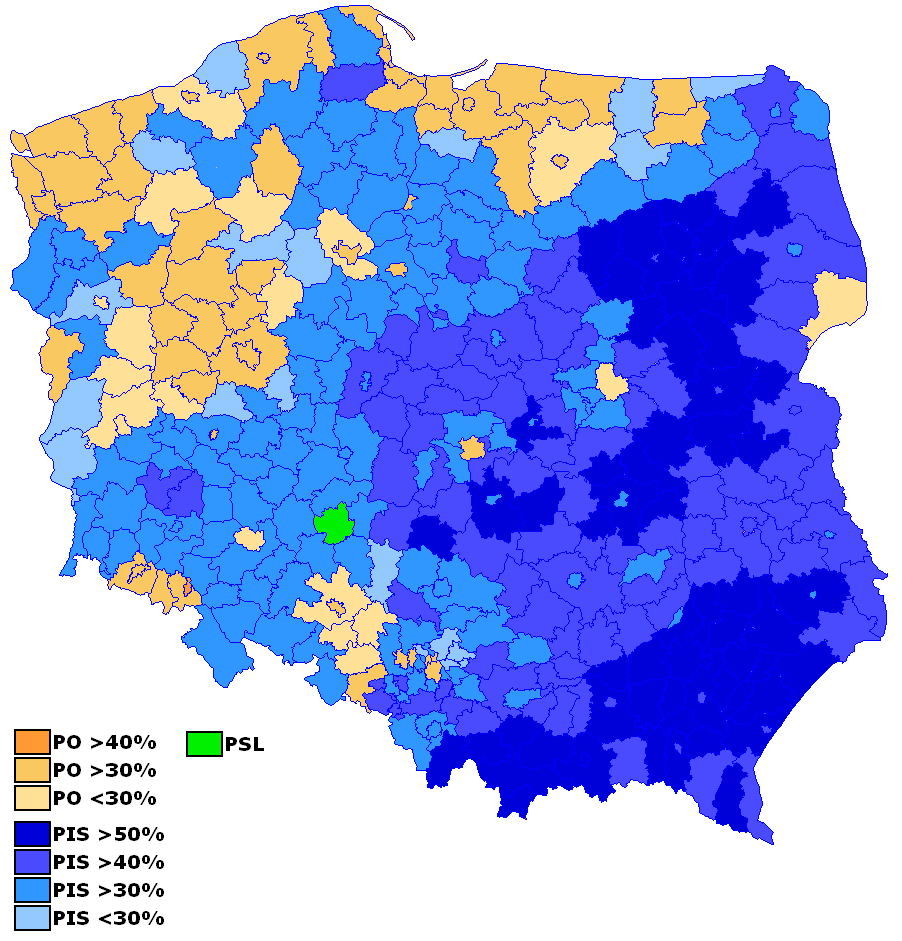
Law and Justice's main support (dark blue) is concentrated in the south-east of the country (former Russian Partition and Austrian Partition). Results of the 2015 Polish parliamentary election.

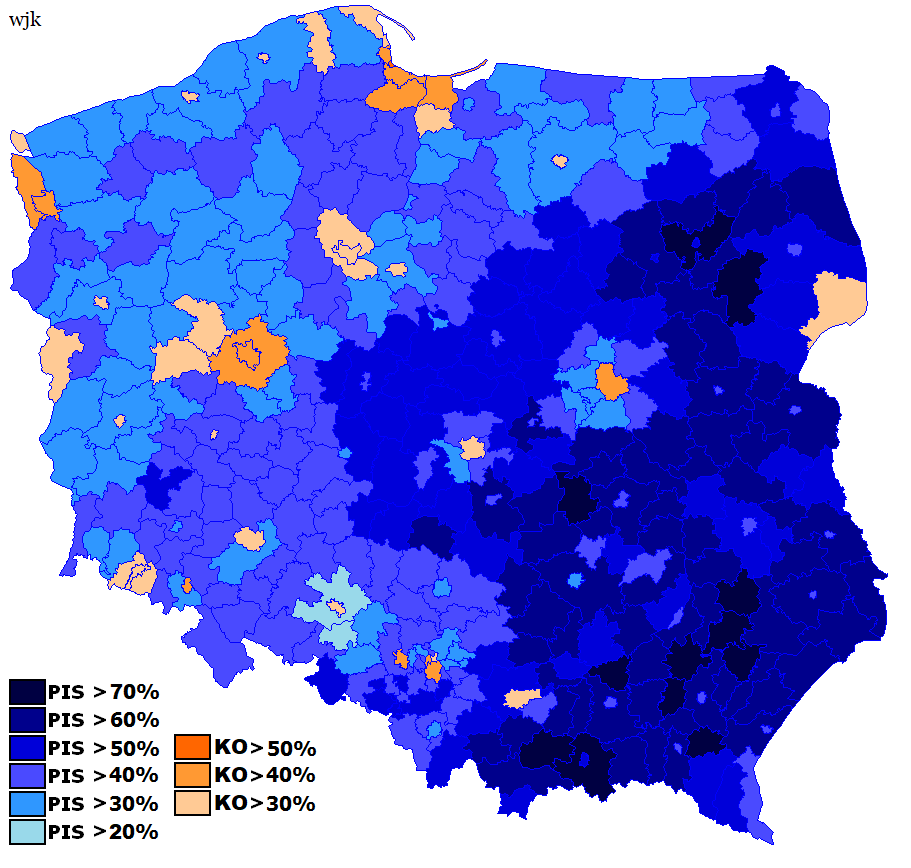
Law and Justice's main support (dark blue). PiS has seen increased support in the 2019 Polish parliamentary election.

Like Civic Platform, but unlike the fringe parties to the right, Law and Justice originated from the anti-communist Solidarity trade union (which is a major cleavage in Polish politics), which was not a theocratic organisation. Solidarity's leadership wanted to back Law and Justice in 2005, but was held back by the union's last experience of party politics, in backing Solidarity Electoral Action.

Today, the party enjoys great support among working class constituencies and union members. Groups that vote for the party include miners, farmers, shopkeepers, unskilled workers, the unemployed, and pensioners. With its left-wing approach toward economics, the party attracts voters who feel that economic liberalisation and European integration have left them behind. The party's core support derives from older, religious people who value conservatism and patriotism. PiS voters are usually located in rural areas and small towns. The strongest region of support is the southeastern part of the country. Voters without a university degree tend to prefer the party more than college-educated voters do.

Regionally, it has more support in regions of Poland that were historically part of western Galicia-Lodomeria and Congress Poland. Since 2015, the borders of support are not as clear as before and party enjoys support in western parts of country, especially these deprived ones. Large cities in all regions are more likely to vote for a more liberal party like PO or .N. Still, PiS receives good support from poor and working class areas in large cities.

Based on this voter profile, Law and Justice forms the core of the conservative post-Solidarity bloc, along with the League of Polish Families and Solidarity Electoral Action, as opposed to liberal conservative post-Solidarity bloc of Civic Platform. The most prominent feature of PiS voters was their emphasis on decommunisation.

David Ost distinguishes three main voters groups that form the base of Law and Justice's support. The first group are conservative Catholics, which support efforts to empower the Church and embrace anti-progressive, conservative social norms. The second group are secular intellectuals which are committed to "Polishness" and an enhanced international position of Poland; they support PiS to push back against the influence of the European Union, which they regard as a tool for Western domination. The third group are the working-class and poor voters that support PiS because of its economic policies which address the economic insecurity and wealth inequality of Poland. The workers that are particularly supportive of PiS are industrial workers and unionized labor, "where classic labor traditions are strongest." These workers also tend to be culturally conservative, which further aligns them with PiS.

The trade union Solidarity has emerged as a staunch ally of Law and Justice in 2015, when the party's presidential candidate Andrzej Duda signed a pledge to implement the economic reforms proposed by Solidarity. Ost wrote: "In its first two years in power, as already noted, PiS essentially delivered on each of the promises.The reduction of the retirement age, the increases in the minimum and hourly wage, the fight against “junk contracts,” the commitment to do battle with the EU in order to subsidize national industrial champions, the greater respect accorded to unions: All of this has made full-time manufacturing employees PiS's most loyal working-class constituency." Ost also notes that given the decline of trade unions in Poland, the PiS' vote potential lies in marginalized labor:

The big change in the last few years has been the entry of more marginal and precarious labor into the political fray, increasingly on the side of the extremist far right. These are the workers from small towns and cities, or from the fringes of the large cities: places where liberal prosperity never really reached. Unions here are virtually non-existent. Workers have few prospects for stable employment, [...] struggling to find some security. To this group PiS has appealed via nationalism. Instead of giving up home and family to be treated as second-class citizens in Manchester or Dublin, PiS promises, together we can build a strong Poland where you can stay home and thrive. For this group, nationalism is not just identity with a swagger, but a concrete economic appeal: We will build industry at home, we will renovate the places liberalism bypassed, and we will not allow Poles to be treated as neocolonial subjects. By regularly charging that previous governments turned Poland into a subordinate colony doing the hard labor for Western exploiters, PiS often sounds like old-school Latin American dependency theorists.

== Ideology ==
Ideological evolution of PiS according to political scientists Michał Krzyżanowski and Natalia Krzyżanowska, starting from its 1990s predecessor, the Centre Agreement

The party is commonly placed on the right wing of the political spectrum. Many observers have classified it as a far-right party, with comparative political research documenting PiS's ideological shift from the conservative right towards the far right. Brils, Muis and Gaidytė (2022) explicitly classify PiS as far-right and describe its transformation from a conservative-right party. Minkenberg and Végh (2024) similarly describe its development from a national-conservative into a radical-right party by 2015. The PopuList 4.0 (2026), an expert-informed database classifying European political parties, identifies PiS as far-right from 2015, having previously considered it a borderline case between 2005 and 2015. Halikiopoulou (2023) also explicitly includes PiS among the far-right parties in her overview of this party family in The Routledge Handbook of Political Parties. Buštíková (2018) described Law and Justice as part of the "radicalized mainstream right". Rovny et al. (2025), analysing the 2024 Chapel Hill Expert Survey, identify PiS as an economically left-leaning member of the radical-right party family, which they explicitly consider part of the broader far right. The party has also been described as centre-right. The party's economic ideology has been described as left-wing, or left-leaning. It has also been described as left-authoritarian, as it represents "left-wing positions on economic policy combined with authoritarian, conservative and nationalist positions on cultural policy issues". It combines conservative, egalitarian and populist elements in its ideology. It is considered to combine policies from the right and left.

Marlene Laruelle described the party as one of the key proponents of illiberalism, a right-wing to far-right ideology which enjoys electoral success and blurs the distinction between illiberalism and mainstream conservatism. Laurelle argues that "the struggle of the European People's Party to win concessions from Orbán's Fidesz or the Polish PiS", along with as "the subjugation of the Republican Party by Donald Trump have revealed how attractive illiberal leaders may be to the more mainstream right." She classified PiS as an example of illiberalism capable of holding pro-Western geopolitical positions, despite opposing Western liberalism, contrasting it to some illiberal movements which embrace anti-Western geopolitics: "for the PiS in Poland, for instance, supporting the US constitutes one of the cornerstones of the country's foreign policy and is decoupled from criticisms of the "decadent West," while for <Putinist> Russia, the fourth script is dominant." Vratislav Havlík wrote in 2021 that while "the notion of 'illiberalism' itself does not appear" in the case of the party, "the very detailed doctrine of the party overall provides a set of characteristics of illiberal ideology that can be more easily grasped than in Hungary: a mistrust of the separation of powers, a mistrust of pluralism (of social and cultural pluralism perhaps even more than of political pluralism), a Christian social and national politically conservative position, exaggerated anti-communism, Euroscepticism and a left paternalist economic policy."

On foreign policy, PiS is Atlanticist and less supportive of European integration than Civic Platform. The party is Soft Eurosceptic and opposes a federal Europe, especially the Euro currency. In its campaigns, it argues that the European Union should "benefit Poland and not the other way around". It is a member of the anti-federalist European Conservatives and Reformists Party, having previously been a part of the Alliance for Europe of the Nations and, before that, the European People's Party. Although it has some elements of Christian democracy, it is not a Christian democratic party.

=== Early ideology ===
The ideological roots of Law and Justice go back to the late 1980s to a Christian-democratic and nationalist wing of the Solidarity movement. The party derives from a dissident faction of Solidarity which felt alienated from the economically liberal policies of the post-communist Polish establishment. This faction was centered around Jarosław Kaczyński as well as President Lech Wałęsa, and was powerful, albeit briefly, in the early 1990s when the capitalist transition was in its early stages. However, it suddenly lost all influence when Kaczyński's party, Centre Agreement, failed to reach the newly established 5% electoral threshold in the 1993 Polish parliamentary election. This led the political movement that would later form PiS to spend the rest of the 1990s with only marginal political influence. It slowly started to re-establish itself in the late 1990s, as this period marked the strongest and most persistent wave of public dissatisfaction with economic liberalism and corruption.

For the first years after its foundation, Law and Justice was characterized as a moderate, single-issue party narrowly focused on the issue of 'law and order', appealing to voters concerned about corruption and high crime rates. In its 2002 assessment of Poland, the Immigration and Nationality Directorate led by the UK government described Law and Justice as "basically a law and order party". In 2003, German political scientist Nikolaus Werz classified Law and Justice as a centrist, law-and-order party that "advocates a strong state, the fight against corruption and the tightening of criminal law". Werz contrasted the moderation of PiS with the radicalism of League of Polish Families, which he described as a nationalist and 'Catholic-fundamentalist' party. In 2003, political scientists Wojciech Sokół and Marek Żmigrodzki classified PiS as Christian democratic.

Initially, the party was broadly pro-market, although less so than the Civic Platform. It had adopted the social market economy rhetoric similar to that of western European Christian democratic parties. In the 2005 election, the party shifted to the protectionist left on economics. As prime minister, Kazimierz Marcinkiewicz was more economically liberal than the Kaczyńskis, advocating a position closer to Civic Platform. According to Michał Krzyżanowski and Natalia Krzyżanowska, the 2000s PiS was "right-centrist and Christian-democratic", and described its core tenets as political Catholicism, strong conservatism, anti-liberalism, nationalism, Euroscepticism, and socio-economic welfare protectionism.

=== Shift towards modern program ===
In 2005, Law and Justice made Civic Platform its main ideological opponent despite their previous closeness - Law and Justice posed a difference between Civic Platform's "liberal Poland" and its "social Poland". The former was marked by economic liberalism, austerity, deregulation and "serving the rich". In contrast, Law and Justice stressed its "social" character, pledging policies that would help the poor. The party attacked Civic Platform's flat tax proposal and advocated a much more active role of the state in the economy. Law and Justice also made "an offer to the left", stressing its economically left-wing policies.

The party's pivot towards the economic left led the leader of far-left Samoobrona, Andrzej Lepper, to endorse Lech Kaczyński in the 2005 Polish presidential election, arguing that left-wing voters must vote against the neoliberalism of Civic Platform; Lepper also justified his decision on the basis of Kaczyński's declarations in support of funding social welfare, fighting unemployment and taking a tougher stance towards the European Union. Law and Justice had undergone a radical ideological change, abandoning its centrist position towards an increasingly populist and nationalist political orientation. This change was also marked by a pivot on the party's position towards the European Union - initially strongly supportive of European integration, PiS became a Eurosceptic party that criticized the EU from nationalist, protectionist, and anti-neoliberal perspectives.

Law and Justice then started radicalizing and broadening its program following its victory in the 2005 Polish parliamentary election. In 2006, Chicago Tribune wrote that "President Kaczynski's Law and Justice Party ran on a populist reform platform but veered sharply to the right after its victory". The same year, Polish journalist Krzysztof Bobiński wrote: "When they started out, the Kaczynski brothers were fairly mainstream ... but now they've gotten into bed with the League of Polish Families and Samoobrona. They are moving to the right, and it's a pretty intolerant right."

According to Polish political scientists Krzysztof Kowalczyk and Jerzy Sielski, Law and Justice had moved from a single-issue party in 2001 to a staunchly and broadly conservative one by 2006. They noted that by 2006 the party started calling for a "conservative revolution" that would restore traditional values to Poland, and gradually adopted right-wing populist rhetoric characterized by a "somewhat leftist" economical policy to undercut the appeal of far-right anti-capitalist League of Polish Families (LPR), agrarian socialist Self-Defence of the Republic of Poland (Samoobrona) and the agrarian Polish People's Party (PSL). The populist pivot of PiS is credited with causing the electoral blowout of Samoobrona and LPR in the 2007 Polish parliamentary election.

In 2015, the party was said to have shifted further left economically, adopting "a more social and less patriotic/conservative" program. In 2024, Marko Zilovic of the George Washington University argued that by 2019, PiS and Hungarian Fidesz have been "rarely thought of as belonging to the mainstream right anymore" because "The combination of left-leaning economic policies and strong cultural conservativism separates them from most other mainstream right parties and puts them in the proximity of the left-conservative parties". In 2025, the German political scientists Sarah Wagner and L. Constantin Wurthmann classified PiS as a left-conservative party, comparing it to the German Sahra Wagenknecht Alliance.

== Party factions ==
The party has two factions that are engaged in power struggle for the dominance in the party — the Scouts (Polish: Harcerze), and the Butter-Makers (Polish: Maślarze). The Scouts represent the political environment of former Prime Minister Mateusz Morawiecki, and the name refers to the fact that many members of the faction were in the Scouting Association of the Republic in their youth. The Butter-Makers do not have a single leader. The faction's name was coined by one of the Scouts, PiS MEP Waldemar Buda, and refers to a social media post by Bocheński in which he expressed outrage about being offered German butter on a LOT Polish Airlines flight; under popular pressure, LOT published an explanation stating that it supports Polish producers, but uses the catering services of destination airports for logistical reasons, which in Bocheński's case was Frankfurt.

The Scouts are described as centre-right and technocratic. They believe that PiS must focus on investing in infrastructure, energy, and economic growth, and de-emphasize "culture wars". The Scouts are strongly critical of Hard Eurosceptic elements in PiS, warning against "the Polexit tone" and expressing the belief that the supporters of radical party members such as Zbigniew Ziobro cannot be trusted to govern responsibly. They are critical of Jarosław Kaczyński, and hope to take over the party once Kaczyński steps down. Their plan is to consolidate PiS into a centre-right, moderately conservative party. The members of this faction include Piotr Müller, Waldemar Buda, Olga Semeniuk-Patkowska, Krzysztof Szczucki, Anna Gembicka, Michał Dworczyk, Paweł Jabłoński, Marcin Horała and Janusz Cieszyński.

The Butter-Makers postulate a sharp turn to the right. They want to distance Poland from the EU and only align with it for Polish self-interest; they are also strongly critical of COVID restrictions introduced under Morawiecki, believing that they were excessive. They are described as "aggressive culture-war figures" and include people such as Przemysław Czarnek, known for his crusade against "leftist ideology" in Polish schools. The Butter-Makers want PiS to turn to the right sharply enough to attract the voters of the Confederation of the Polish Crown, and others who became disillusioned with Law and Justice and drifted towards far-right movements. They have been described as hardline and nationalist. Key representatives of this faction are Patryk Jaki, Przemysław Czarnek, Jacek Sasin, and Tobiasz Bocheński.

There are also two factions that are now considered historical — the Monks (Polish: Zakoniarze), and the Ziobrists (Polish: Ziobryści). The Monks were the "old guard" of the party and were also known as the "Order of the Centre Agreement", as it referred to the closest environment of Jarosław Kaczyński and consisted of people who were members of the Centre Agreement, a 1990s party led by Kaczyński brothers that preceded PiS. People who used to be the members of this faction, such as Mariusz Błaszczak, are considered to have been absorded by the Butter-Makers. Ziobryści were, in turn, supporters of the former Minister of Justice and Prosecutor General Zbigniew Ziobro, and included the members of his party Sovereign Poland. Members of this faction included Jacek Ozdoba, Sebastian Kaleta, and Patryk Jaki. They have since become a part of the Butter-Makers instead.

=== Political associations ===
In June 2026, the party's divide between the Scouts and Butter-Makers has been formalized as two political associations within Law and Justice emerged — Rozwój Plus led by Morawiecki, and Po Pierwsze Polska led by Sasin. Rozwój Plus represents the political environment of the Scouts, while Po Pierwsze Polska represents the Butter-Makers. On 15 April, Morawiecki created Rozwój Plus, with the stated goal of seeking dialogue and broad agreement with other political movements, supporting Polish socioeconomic development, and creating a patriotic camp beyond party lines. Kaczyński was initially hostile towards the association, and accused Morawiecki of breaking away from the party. However, on 20 April, Kaczyński declared that he accepted the existence of Rozwój Polska on condition that it functions only within Law and Justice; he also announced a creation of an Expert Council for the party of which Rozwój Polska members would become a part of. On 9 June, Sasin founded Po Pierwsze Polska, a political association within PiS, with preserving party unity and supporting the candidacy of Przemysław Czarnek as its stated goals. Its creation is considered a response to Morawiecki's own move. Morawiecki's Rozwój Plus consists of over 40 PiS MPs, while Po Pierwsze Polska has about 100 to 110 PiS MPs as its members.

== Platform ==
=== Economy ===
Political alignment of Polish parties by political scientists Seongcheol Kim and Endre Borbáth. Law and Justice is coded as PiS, and occupies a socioeconomically left-wing and socioculturally conservative position. Its 2000s coalition partners SRP and LPR are shown as very similar ideologically to PiS.

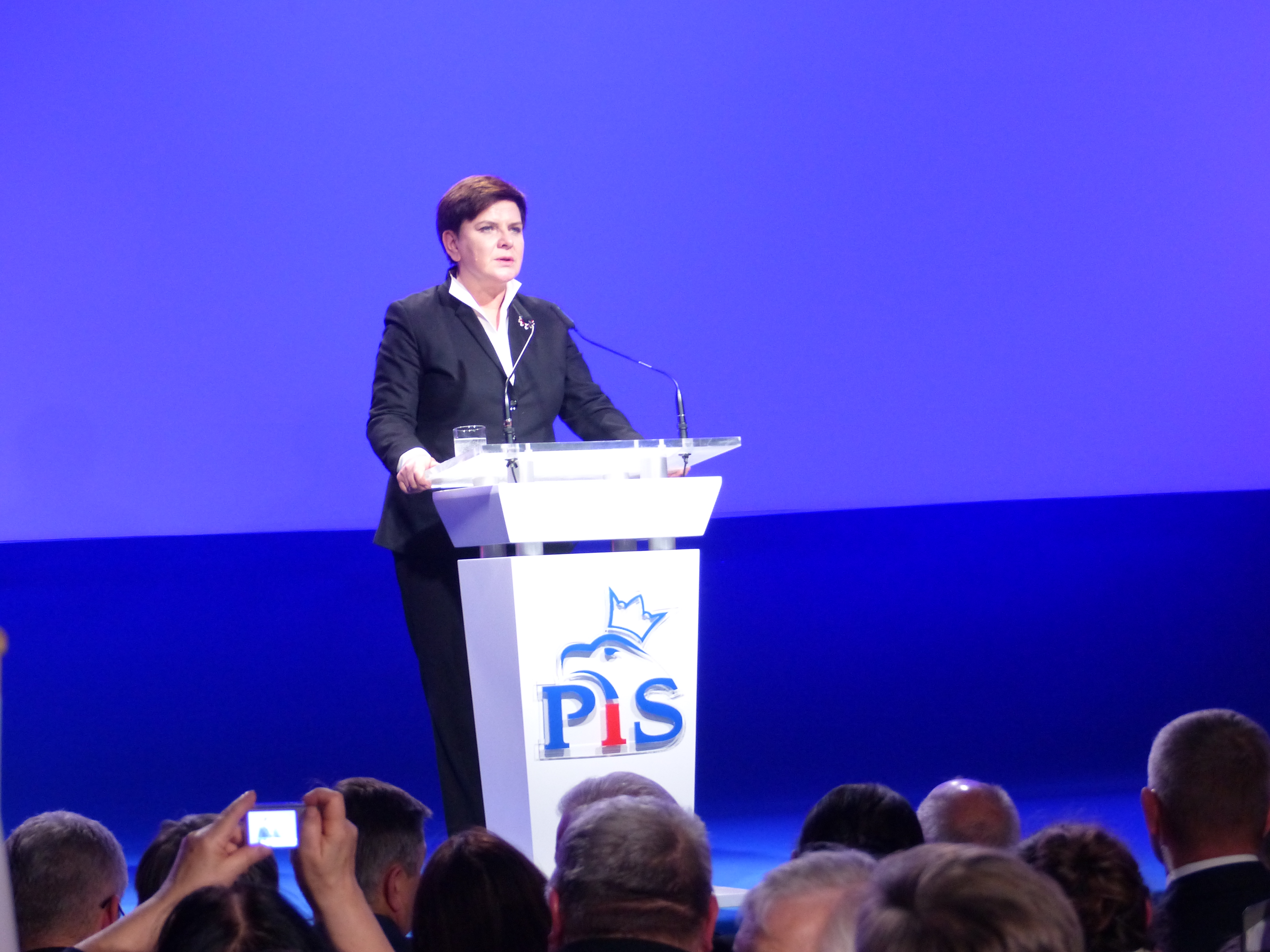
Beata Szydło during the National Independence Day

Political alignment of Polish parties in 2010 and 2019 by Alexandra A. Żubrowicz. PiS is shown to have maintained itself as the main economically left, socially conservative, and anti-EU party in Polish politics.

The party supports a state-guaranteed minimum social safety net and extensive state intervention in the economy, and argues that a "more socially sensitive and less market-dominated" economic system is necessary. It advocates progressive taxation that would redistribute the wealth from the wealthy to the poor, and it supports a large-scale social housing program. The party promised and implemented tax and welfare benefits to married couples and family. It also adheres to the principles of economic nationalism, postulating state control over key sectors of the economy. It seeks to increase healthcare spending to 6% of the Polish GDP, and nationalize hospital debts. During the 2015 election campaign, it proposed tax rebates related to the number of children in a family, as well as a reduction of the VAT rate (while keeping a variation between individual types of VAT rates). In 2019, the lowest personal income tax threshold was decreased from 18% to 17%. Its policies have been described as redistributive, and that its 2015–2023 government marked "the first time in over two decades that a government had taken steps to curb the neoliberal dismantling of social services" in Poland.

Law and Justice is described as state-interventionist and anti-privatisation, opposing flat tax and favoring a welfare state based on extensively developed state-run health service. In its 2006-2007 government, it committed to expanding welfare spending and the role of the state in the economy, often at expense of foreign investors and the European Commission. It halted the construction of foreign-owned supermarkets and prevent the existing ones from opening on Sundays in an effort to prevent monopolization. In 2006, it also set up commissions to investigate and scrutinize sale of Polish banks to foreign entities after 1989, and to investigate the role of the Polish Central Bank in privatization. In 2019, the party introduced a bill proposing a financial benefit in the form of a 13th pension, intended for retirees and pensioners receiving the minimum old-age pension on 1 May 2019. And subsequently on an annual basis starting in 2020. A 14th pension was introduced on 21 January 2021 and is now paid out with 13th pension.

PiS opposes cutting social welfare spending, and also proposed the introduction of a system of state-guaranteed housing loans. The party also opposes foreign ownership of crucial industries and businesses, and proposed buying back the largest convenience store chain in Poland, Żabka, from its foreign owners. It also supports state provided universal health care. PiS has been also described as statist, protectionist, solidarist, and interventionist. It also holds agrarianist views. Given the redistributive and protectionist agenda of the party as well as its focus on welfare and nationalization, political scientists classify Law and Justice as economically left-wing. Stephen Park Turner likewise classified it as having "economically leftist policies on trade and welfare." It has also been described as economically left-leaning by the Centre for European Reform, Reuters, and The Routledge Handbook of East European Politics. Political economist Cédric M. Koch wrote that PiS combines "political communitarianism with neo-socialist economic views".

The economic policies of Law and Justice marked a notable departure from the economically liberal policies of other Polish governments. The party rallies against the "Republic of the Rich", highlighting the wealth inequality in Poland and the need for redistribution and welfare expansion. The party's former Prime Minister Mateusz Morawiecki stated: "It turns out that the rules of capitalism are not sacred, inviolable and uniform... in the new Polish economic and social model we are demonstrating to Europe how social solidarity can be coupled with dynamic economic development. Solidarism should be that economic system." Morawiecki also asserted that the "socialist working-class thought is deeply rooted in the philosophy of Law and Justice". Jarosław Kaczyński in turn argued: "The left has completely lost its social sensitivity (...), social sensitivity is here today, among other places, right where I am at this moment. And if it were to be associated with left-wing politics — because it is obviously not true that social sensitivity has ever been the monopoly of the left — then it has to be said that the left is here, not there." Political scientists Haris Dajč and Natasza Styczyńska write of a political realignment that Law and Justice embodies:

Polish voters generally orient themselves by comparing to their experience of communism and to the subsequent transition. Individuals on the political left are frequently equally positive about the transition and secularism. Those on the radical right frequently advocate breaching of the 1989 imaginary and support of an active role of the Church in public affairs. The second notable feature of the Polish voter is the alignment of the political right with the working class. There is a collective perception that the left is an elites’ project. Therefore, the political rationale is for the right to become an anti-elitist representative of the ordinary people. That can be illustrated by the alliance between the Solidarity Trade Union, the biggest labour group in the country, with the Law and Justice Party.

Writing on the economic policies of Law and Justice and their character, American political scientist David Ost wrote:

So, since winning power for the second time in 2015, PiS has taken real efforts to tame economic liberalism. It reversed the previous government's hiking of the retirement age, offered new drug benefits for the elderly, and has initiated a broad program for the construction of new affordable housing. It has limited employer use of insecure short-term “junk contracts,” and raised the guaranteed hourly minimum to 13 złotys (nearly $4), a significant increase upon prevailing informal standards. Its hallmark social policy has been a new child-benefit program, with a monthly payment of 500 złotys (about $140) to parents of each second and additional child under eighteen, paid for, in part, by a new surcharge tax imposed on foreign-owned banks and insurance companies. For the many hundreds of thousands of working parents earning only 2,000–2,500 złotys a month, this meant a sudden untaxed pay raise of twenty or even forty percent. Within a year, children living in extreme poverty declined by a third. Single mothers found themselves able to quit overly exploitative jobs and seek other options. [...] With such rhetoric and policies, PiS is embracing a project that really deserves the name it is impossible to apply: national socialism.

Political scientists Michał Zabdyr-Jamróz, Olga Löblová, Alexandru D. Moise, and Iwona Kowalska-Bobko argued that PiS is ideologically "a combination of Christian conservatism in cultural policies and social-democratic welfare policies". They noted that PiS generally refrained from welfare chauvinism, "making it look almost social-democratic in comparison to the chauvinism of Western European parties". Law and Justice's return to power in 2015 marked a departure from neoliberalism, and made PiS a competition not only to the nominally left Lewica, but also even more economically left-oriented groups. Its economic approach has been described as left-wing, "neo-Weberian", and social-democratic; it focused especially on expanding healthcare access and guaranteeing free-of-charge services. The party's 2019 manifesto said:

We are convinced that escaping the middle-income trap and breaking away from the ‘dependent market economy’ is possible only through an active economic policy of the state. We do not believe that ‘the capital has no nationality’. We reject principles of neoliberalism.

The party's healthcare policies including reversing pro-market reform, including reversing and prohibiting the commercialization of public healthcare providers. It also increased the salaries of doctors. In 2016, PiS proposed an ambitious reform of replacing Poland's current health insurance system with tax-financed universal healthcare. These proposals were abandoned, although in its place the party committed to perpetually increase public funding for healthcare by about 0.2% of GDP annually. Zabdyr-Jarmóz, Löblová, Moise and Kowalska-Bobko concluded that the policies of PiS are "closer to social-democratic than even a Christian-democratic party", and wrote:

Unlike some PRR [populist radical right] practitioners, for instance, Donald Trump, PiS does not use its pro-social agenda as an instrumental tool only to be forgotten after the elections. Given its size and its capacity to conceptualise and implement reforms, PiS is more similar to a traditional catch-all party than a fringe PRR party that needs a senior partner to enter into government (similar to, for instance, Austria). In health policy, the government has proposed and begun implementing numerous reforms that are not primarily driven by ideology and are arguably adequate responses (not prone to partisan critique) responses to urgent problems of Polish health care, such as increasing funding for health care, retaining and training new health professionals and decreasing waiting times. It also initiated or continued several non-partisan technological access improvements such as e-health expansion. PiS does not conform to contemporary Western European left-right cleavages: PiS is highly sceptical of neoliberal globalist policies, in line with the perspective of the economic left. PiS has a strong social-democratic economic programme and in their manifesto stands clearly against austerity, privatisation or commercialisation of public services. At one point, the leader of PiS, Jarosław Kaczyński, has even (on record) praised and recommended the book Capital in the Twenty-First Century by Thomas Piketty – a bestselling economic analysis arguing for social-democratic reforms in light of growing economic inequalities.

The economic views and policies of Law and Justice derive from the Polish political party Self-Defence of the Republic of Poland (Samoobrona) led by Andrzej Lepper. Law and Justice appropriated the economic rhetoric and views of Samoobrona following its complete collapse in the 2007 Polish parliamentary election. Samoobrona is an economically far-left party, much further left than parties of post-communist origin such as the social-democratic Democratic Left Alliance. After Samoobrona and the far-right anti-capitalist League of Polish Families (LPR) formed a coalition with PiS in 2006 in order to prevent the neoliberal Civic Platform from coming to power, Law and Justice managed to claim the voters of both parties by "taking up economically inclusionary discourse from the originally left-wing Self-Defence and outbidding the LPR on cultural conservatism".

Ever since, Law and Justice has been critical of the capitalist transformation in Poland, accusing the 1990s Polish cabinets of 'choosing the wrong path of transformation after the 1989 system change' and leading to 'beneficiaries under such capitalist conditions [having] become undeservedly privileged'. Rakib Ehsan of the UK's Spiked website argued in 2019 that that PiS pursues a "brand of ‘red and blue’ politics – social-democratic economics combined with socio-cultural conservatism". Similarly, Polish political scientist Marek M. Kamiński described PiS as "culturally conservative, economically social democratic". Foreign Affairs remarked that the program of PiS "amounts to a very leftist (or, rather, a Catholic socialist) set of economic policies", listing policies such as increasing minimum wage, abolishing short-term job contracts, limiting self-employment contracts abused by employers to avoid benefit payments, decreasing retirement age, increasing family benefits, implementing social payments for large families, and enacting a special tax on foreign banks' assets and foreign big stores.

Igor S. Putintsev wrote that "the political views of PiS are 70% right-wing and socioeconomic ones 100% left-wing", arguing that PiS pursuses a "proactive and consistent social policy", which included its 500+ state program, annulment of neoliberal pension reforms carried out under Civic Platform and reduction in retirement age. Putintsev credited PiS with constructing "a Polish model of a modern welfare state". The party claims to represent the "marginalised vast majority of Poles" who had to bear the costs of capitalist transformation, and states that its main goal is to provide the "common man its fair economic share of societal resources". Law and Justice is highly critical of neoliberalism, describing it as "anti-family" and arguing that neoliberal policies are responsible for social inequality, as well as maximizing profit at the cost of the "ordinary people" and "Catholic values". The party proposes increasing social benefit payments, raising the minimum wage, increasing expenditures on child nutrition and benefits to worse-off families. It also postulates more subsidies and state control of the Polish infrastructure, and expansion of the healthcare and education system. The party also opposes privatization, stating: "We cannot deprive the state of influence and responsibility for the social order, in particular for the weakest social groups whose situation as a result of the transformation has been rapidly deteriorating."

=== National political structures ===
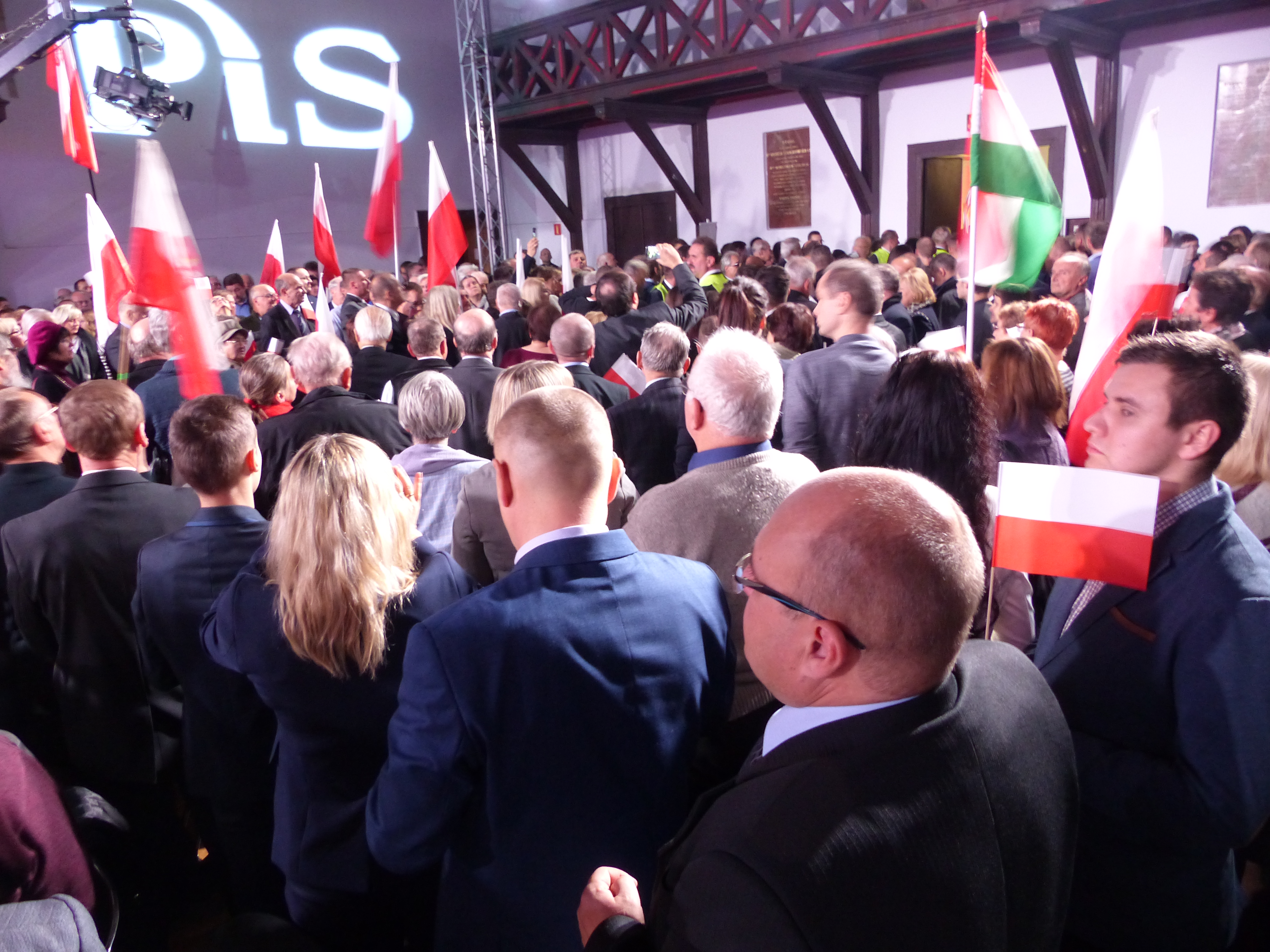
PiS meeting on National Independence Day

PiS has presented a project for constitutional reform including, among others: allowing the president the right to pass laws by decree (when prompted to do so by the Cabinet), a reduction of the number of members of the Sejm and Senat, and removal of constitutional bodies overseeing the media and monetary policy. PiS advocates increased criminal penalties. It postulates aggressive anti-corruption measures (including creation of an Anti-Corruption Bureau (CBA), open disclosure of the assets of politicians and important public servants), as well as broad and various measures to smooth the working of public institutions.

PiS is a strong supporter of lustration (lustracja), a verification system created ostensibly to combat the influence of the Communist era security apparatus in Polish society. While current lustration laws require the verification of those who serve in public offices, PiS wants to expand the process to include university professors, lawyers, journalists, managers of large companies, and others performing "public functions". Those found to have collaborated with the security service, according to the party, should be forbidden to practice in their professions.

=== Diplomacy and defence ===
The party is in favour of strengthening the Polish Army through diminishing bureaucracy and raising military expenditures, especially for modernisation of army equipment. The party supports Polish membership in NATO, arguing that Poland should fulfill its military obligations and aspire to become one of the countries that shape NATO policy. In its 2001 program, the party called for maintaining compulsory military service, but shortening it as much as possible, writing: "PiS will strive to shorten the duration of compulsory military service to the extent possible, so that it is limited to the conscript training process. Universal military service should be imposed on the best conscripts, raising the level of the reserves and creating appropriate social role models. We will support the development of an attractive military training programme for students and a military class programme in secondary schools, together with an appropriate incentive system."

Later the party abandoned its support of military draft - it planned to introduce a fully professional army and end conscription by 2012; in August 2008, compulsory military service was abolished in Poland. It is also in favour of participation of Poland in foreign military missions led by the United Nations, NATO and United States, in countries like Afghanistan and Iraq. The party moderated its policies in the wake of its coalition with far-left Samoobrona and far-right LPR in 2006, as both parties demanded withdrawal of Polish troops from Iraq and Afghanistan, and distancing Poland from the European Union.

Ever since its founding in 2001, Law and Justice had a catalogue of complex reforms in the sphere of defence and national security, which it also connected to economic matters. The party postulates a national security law that would expand the legal capabilities of special and public security services. Law and Justice proposed monitoring key industries such as energy, telecommunications, banking as well as stock exchange, including taking note of the ownership situation in these economic sectors and the main companies operating in these fields. The national security act and extensive monitoring of the economy were to provide the basis for the Polish government to safeguard economic security by partial or complete compulsory state buyouts of companies "whose operation on the market creates a direct or potential threat to national security". In this way, the party connected its anti-privatization views with its law-and-order proposals.

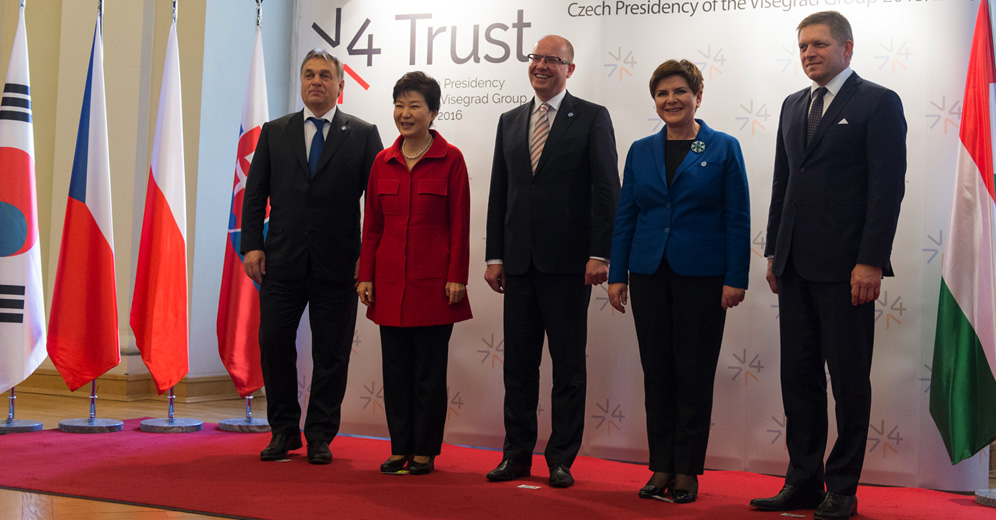
Visegrád Group leaders' meeting in Prague, 2015

PiS is eurosceptic, although the party supports integration with the European Union on terms beneficial for Poland. It supports economic integration and tightening cooperation in areas of energy security and military operations, but is sceptical about closer political integration. It is against the formation of a European superstate or federation. PiS is in favour of a strong political and military alliance between Poland and the United States. In 2006, Kaczyński spoke of the EU: "My opinion of the EU is the following: A super state which polarizes countries' areas of competence but which at the same time is rather helpless because it only has a symbolic budget... The EU is an artificial creation." In the European Parliament, it is a member of the European Conservatives and Reformists, a group founded in 2009 to challenge the prevailing pro-federalist ethos of the European Parliament and address the perceived democratic deficit existing at a European level.

Law and Justice has frequently expressed anti-German, and anti-Russian stances. It has taken a hardline stance against Russia in its foreign policy since the party's foundation. The party vocally advocated for military aid to Ukraine during the 2022 Russian invasion of Ukraine, but announced it would halt arms transfers in September 2023 following disagreements over the export of Ukrainian grain to Poland. The party has been described as divided between pro-Ukrainian and anti-Ukrainian factions.

PiS has historically advocated for a pro-Israel policy, although relations with Israel deteriorated following the 2018 Amendment to the Act on the Institute of National Remembrance and subsequent diplomatic incidents. In opposition, PiS called for the expulsion of the Israeli Ambassador following the World Central Kitchen drone strikes, in which a Polish citizen was killed.

The PiS government supported accession of Turkey to the European Union. PiS also advocates for a strong relationship with Hungary under Viktor Orbán, though they diverged over the Russo-Ukrainian War. Law and Justice criticised the Polish government's decision in 2008 to recognise the independence of Kosovo from Serbia.

=== Social policies ===
The party's views on social issues are much more traditionalist than those of social conservative parties in other European countries, and its social views reflect those of the Christian right. PiS has been described to hold right-wing populist views. The party presents itself as a champion of Catholicism, and in accordance with the Catholic social teaching, it opposes euthanasia and legal recognition of homosexual couples. It also supports strengthening restrictions on abortion. However, the party also took positions that conflicted with the Church's teaching, such as favoring the death penalty or demonstrating flexible stances on stem cell research and vitro fertilization.

==== Family ====
The party strongly promotes itself as a pro-family party and encourages married couples to have more children. Prior to 2005 elections, it promised to build three million inexpensive housing units as a way to help young couples start a family. Once in government, it passed legislation lengthening parental leaves.

In 2017, the PiS government commenced the so-called "500+" programme under which all parents residing in Poland receive an unconditional monthly payment of 500 PLN for each second and subsequent child (the 500 PLN support for the first child being linked to income). It also revived the idea of a housing programme based on state-supported construction of inexpensive housing units.

Also in 2017, the party's MPs passed a law that bans most retail trade on Sundays on the premise that workers will supposedly spend more time with their families.

==== Abortion ====
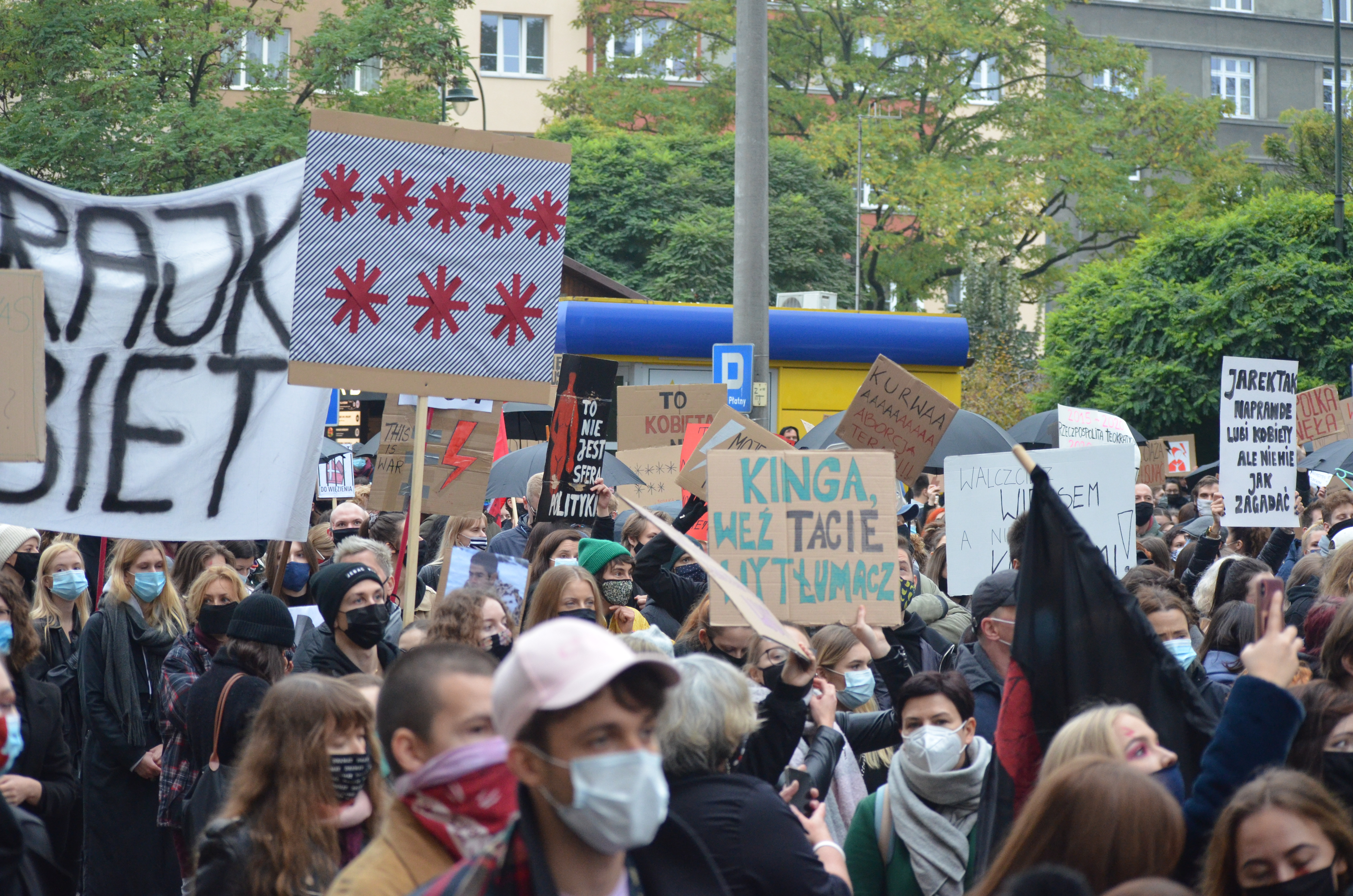
Anti-PiS poster during the October 2020 protests in Kraków (Five stars represent a common profanity, three represent the party name.)

The party is anti-abortion and supports further restrictions on Poland's abortion laws which are already one of the most restrictive in Europe. PiS opposes abortion resulting from foetal defects which is currently allowed until specific foetal age.

In 2016, PiS supported legislation to ban abortion under all circumstances, and investigate miscarriages. After the black Protests the legislation was withdrawn.

In October 2020, the Constitutional Court ruled that one of three circumstances (foetal defects) is unconstitutional. However, many constitutionalists argue that this judgement is invalid.

The party is against euthanasia and comprehensive sex education. It has proposed a ban of in-vitro fertilisation.

==== Disability rights ====
In April 2018, the PiS government announced a PLN 23 billion (EUR 5.5 billion) programme (named "Accessibility+") aimed at reducing barriers for disabled people, to be implemented 2018–2025.

Also in April 2018, parents of disabled adults who required long-term care protested in Sejm over what they considered inadequate state support, in particular, the reduction of support once the child turns 18. As a result, the monthly disability benefit for adults was raised by approx. 15 per cent to PLN 1,000 (approx. EUR 240) and certain non-cash benefits were instituted, although protesters' demands of an additional monthly cash benefit were rejected.

==== Gay rights ====
The party opposes the LGBT movement and many of its postulates, in particular same-sex marriages and any other form of legal recognition of same-sex couples. In 2020, Poland was ranked the lowest of any European Union country for LGBT rights by ILGA-Europe. The organisation also highlighted instances of anti-LGBT rhetoric and hate speech by politicians of the ruling party.

In Bączkowski and Others v. Poland, the European Court of Human Rights unanimously ruled that the ban of the parade violated Articles 11, 13 and 14 of the European Convention on Human Rights. The judgement stated that "The positive obligation of a State to secure genuine and effective respect for freedom of association and assembly was of particular importance to those with unpopular views or belonging to minorities".

In 2016, Beata Szydło's government disbanded the Council for the Prevention of Racial Discrimination, Xenophobia and Intolerance, an advisory body set up in 2011 by then-Prime Minister Donald Tusk. The council monitored, advised and coordinated government action against racism, discrimination and hate crime.

Many local towns, cities, and Voivodeship sejmiks comprising a third of Poland's territory have declared their respective regions as LGBT-free zones with the encouragement of the ruling PiS. Polish President Andrzej Duda, who was the Law and Justice party's candidate for presidency in 2015 and 2020, stated that "LGBT is not people, it's an ideology which is worse than Communism." During his successful 2020 election campaign, he pledged he would ban teaching about LGBT issues in schools; he also proposed changing the constitution to ban LGBT couples from adopting children.

==== Nationalism ====
Academic research has characterised Law and Justice as a partially nationalist party, but PiS's leadership rejects this label. (Note: During the 2008 Polish Independence Day celebrations, Lech Kaczyński said in his speech during the visit to the city of Elbląg that "the state is a great value, and attachment to the state, to one's fatherland, we call patriotism – beware of the word nationalism, as nationalism is evil!" On the same day during the celebrations in Warsaw, L. Kaczyński again stated: "patriotism doesn't equal nationalism." In 2011, Jarosław Kaczyński criticised pre-war Polish nationalism for "its intellectual, political and moral failure" by emphasising that the movement "did not know how to deal with and solve the problems of Polish minorities.") Both Kaczyńskis look up for inspirations to the pre-war Sanacja movement with its leader Józef Piłsudski, in contrast to the nationalist Endecja that was led by Piłsudski's political archrival, Roman Dmowski. However, parts of the party, especially the faction around Radio Maryja, are inspired by Dmowski's movement. Polish far-right organisations and parties such as National Revival of Poland, National Movement and Autonomous Nationalists regularly criticise PiS's relative ideological moderation and its politicians for "monopolizing" official political scene by playing on the popular patriotic and religious feelings. However, the party does include several overtly nationalist politicians in senior positions, such as Digital Affairs Minister Adam Andruszkiewicz, the former leader of the All-Polish Youth; and deputy PiS leader and former Defence Minister Antoni Macierewicz, the founder of the National-Catholic Movement. It has been also described as national-conservative.

==== Refugees and economic migrants ====
PiS opposed the quota system for mass relocation of immigrants proposed by the European Commission to address the 2015 European migrant crisis. This contrasted with the stance of their main political opponents, the Civic Platform, which have signed up to the commission's proposal. Consequently, in the campaign leading to the 2015 Polish parliamentary election, PiS adopted the discourse typical of the populist-right, linking national security with immigration. Following the election, PiS sometimes utilised Islamophobic rhetoric to rally its supporters.

Examples of anti-migration and anti-Islam comments by PiS politicians when discussing the European migrant crisis: in 2015, Jarosław Kaczyński stated that Poland can not accept any refugees because "they could spread infectious diseases." In 2017, the first Deputy Minister of Justice Patryk Jaki stated that "stopping Islamization is his Westerplatte". In 2017, Interior minister of Poland Mariusz Błaszczak stated that he would like to be called "Charles the Hammer who stopped the Muslim invasion of Europe in the 8th century". In 2017, Deputy Speaker of the Sejm Joachim Brudziński stated during the pro-party rally in Siedlce; "if not for us (PiS), they (Muslims) would have built mosques in here (Poland)."

== Structure ==
=== Party leaders ===
No.	Image	Chairman	Tenure
1		Lech Kaczyński	13 June 2001 – 18 January 2003
2		Jarosław Kaczyński	18 January 2003 – Incumbent

Vice-chairmen:

- Mariusz Błaszczak
- Joachim Brudziński
- Tobiasz Bocheński
- Przemysław Czarnek
- Patryk Jaki
- Anna Krupka
- Antoni Macierewicz
- Mateusz Morawiecki
- Beata Szydło
- Elżbieta Witek
- Zbigniew Ziobro

Treasurer:

- Henryk Kowalczyk

Spokesperson:

- Rafał Bochenek

Party discipline spokesman:

- Karol Karski

Chairman of the Executive Committee:

- Piotr Milowański

President of the Parliamentary Club:

- Mariusz Błaszczak

== Election results ==
=== Presidential ===
Election year	Candidate	1st round		2nd round	
Election year	Candidate	# of overall votes	% of overall vote	# of overall votes	% of overall vote
2005	Lech Kaczyński	4,947,927	33.1 (#2)	8,257,468	54.0 (#1)
2010	Jarosław Kaczyński	6,128,255	36.5 (#2)	7,919,134	47.0 (#2)
2015	Andrzej Duda	5,179,092	34.8 (#1)	8,719,281	51.5 (#1)
2020	Supported Andrzej Duda	8,450,513	43.5 (#1)	10,440,648	51.0 (#1)
2025	Supported Karol Nawrocki	5,790,804	29.5 (#2)	10,606,877	50.9 (#1)

=== Sejm ===
Election	Leader	Votes	%	Seats	+/–	Government
2001	Lech Kaczyński	1,236,787	9.5 (#4)	44 / 460	New	SLD–UP–PSL (2001-2003)
2001	Lech Kaczyński	1,236,787	9.5 (#4)	44 / 460	New	SLD–UP Minority (2003-2004)
2001	Lech Kaczyński	1,236,787	9.5 (#4)	44 / 460	New	SLD-UP-SDPL Minority (2004-2005)
2005	Jarosław Kaczyński	3,185,714	27.0 (#1)	155 / 460	▲111	PiS Minority (2005-2006)
2005	Jarosław Kaczyński	3,185,714	27.0 (#1)	155 / 460	▲111	PiS–SRP–LPR (2006-2007)
2005	Jarosław Kaczyński	3,185,714	27.0 (#1)	155 / 460	▲111	PiS Minority (2007)
2007	Jarosław Kaczyński	5,183,477	32.1 (#2)	166 / 460	▲11	PO–PSL
2011	Jarosław Kaczyński	4,295,016	29.9 (#2)	157 / 460	▼9	PO–PSL
2015	Jarosław Kaczyński	5,711,687	37.6 (#1)	193 / 460	▲36	PiS
2015	Jarosław Kaczyński	As a part of the United Right coalition, which won 235 seats in total.				
2019	Jarosław Kaczyński	8,051,935	43.6 (#1)	187 / 460	▼6	PiS
2019	Jarosław Kaczyński	As a part of the United Right coalition, which won 235 seats in total.				
2023	Jarosław Kaczyński	7,640,854	35.4 (#1)	161 / 460	▼26	PiS Minority (2023)
2023	Jarosław Kaczyński	7,640,854	35.4 (#1)	161 / 460	▼26	KO–PL2050–KP–NL (2023-2026)
2023	Jarosław Kaczyński	7,640,854	35.4 (#1)	161 / 460	▼26	KO–KP–NL–PL2050–C (2026-present)
2023	As a part of the United Right coalition, which won 194 seats in total.					

=== Senate ===
Election	Seats	+/–	Majority
2001	0 / 100	New	Opposition
2001	As part of the Senate 2001 coalition, which won 15 seats.		
2005	49 / 100	▲49	PiS Minority (2005-2006)
2005	49 / 100	▲49	Coalition (2006-2007)
2005	49 / 100	▲49	PiS Minority (2007)
2007	39 / 100	▼10	Opposition
2011	31 / 100	▼8	Opposition
2015	61 / 100	▲30	PiS
2019	38 / 100	▼23	Opposition
2019	As part of the United Right coalition, which won 48 seats.		
2023	29 / 100	▼9	Opposition
2023	As part of the United Right coalition, which won 34 seats.		

=== European Parliament ===
Election	Leader	Votes	%	Seats	+/–	EP Group
2004	Jarosław Kaczyński	771,858	12.67 (#3)	7 / 54	New	UEN
2009	Jarosław Kaczyński	2,017,607	27.40 (#2)	15 / 50	▲8	ECR
2014	Jarosław Kaczyński	2,246,870	31.78 (#2)	15 / 51	0	ECR
2019	Jarosław Kaczyński	6,192,780	45.38 (#1)	21 / 51	▲6	ECR
2019	Jarosław Kaczyński	As part of the United Right coalition, that won 27 seats in total.				
2024	Jarosław Kaczyński	4,253,169	36.16 (#2)	18 / 53	▼3	ECR
2024	Jarosław Kaczyński	As part of the United Right coalition, that won 20 seats in total.				

*Currently 16: Zdzisław Krasnodębski is elected from the PiS register, but not a member of the party, Mirosław Piotrowski left PiS (08.10.2014), Marek Jurek is a member of Right Wing of the Republic.

=== Regional assemblies ===
Election year	% of vote	# of overall seats won	+/–
2002	12.1 (#4)	79 / 561	New
2002	In coalition with Civic Platform as POPiS.		
2006	25.1 (#2)	170 / 561	▲91
2010	23.1 (#2)	141 / 561	▼29
2014	26.9 (#1)	171 / 555	▲30
2018	34.1 (#1)	254 / 552	▲83
2024	34.3 (#1)	239 / 552	▼15

=== County councils ===
Election year	% of vote	# of overall seats won	+/–
2002	12.1 (#4)	48 / 6,294	New
2002	In coalition with Civic Platform as POPiS.		
2006	19.8 (#1)	1,242 / 6,284	▲1194
2010	17.3 (#2)	1,085 / 6,290	▼157
2014	23.5 (#1)	1,514 / 6,276	▲429
2018	30.5 (#1)	2,114 / 6,244	▲600
2024	30.0 (#1)	2,080 / 6,170	▼34

=== Mayors ===
Election	No.	Change
2002	2	New
2006	77	▲75
2010	37	▼40
2014	124	▲87
2018	234	▲110
2024	105	▼129

=== Presidents of the Republic of Poland ===
Name	Image	From	To
Lech Kaczyński		23 December 2005	10 April 2010
Andrzej Duda		6 August 2015	6 August 2025
Karol Nawrocki		6 August 2025	incumbent

=== Prime Ministers of the Republic of Poland ===
Name	Image	From	To
Kazimierz Marcinkiewicz		31 October 2005	14 July 2006
Jarosław Kaczyński		14 July 2006	16 November 2007
Beata Szydło		16 November 2015	11 December 2017
Mateusz Morawiecki		11 December 2017	13 December 2023

=== Voivodeship Marshals ===
Name	Image	Voivodeship	Date vocation
Jarosław Stawiarski		Lublin Voivodeship	21 November 2018
Władysław Ortyl		Podkarpackie Voivodeship	27 May 2013
Łukasz Smółka		Lesser Poland Voivodeship	4 July 2024

=== Representation in regional assemblies ===
Table last updated on 1 October 2025

Voivodeship	Seats	Governance
Lower Silesian	6 / 36	Opposition
Kuyavian-Pomeranian	11 / 30	Opposition
Lublin	21 / 33	Majority
Lubusz	10 / 30	Opposition
Łódź	16 / 33	Opposition
Lesser Poland	21 / 39	Majority
Masovian	20 / 51	Opposition
Opole	10 / 30	Opposition
Subcarpathian	21 / 33	Majority
Podlaskie	12 / 30	Opposition
Pomeranian	10 / 33	Opposition
Silesian	18 / 45	Opposition
Świętokrzyskie	14 / 30	PiS-ONRP
Warmian-Masurian	11 / 30	Opposition
Greater Poland	15 / 39	Opposition
West Pomeranian	10 / 30	Opposition
All seats		226 / 552

== See also ==
- 2010 Polish Air Force Tu-154 crash
- List of Law and Justice politicians
- Polish constitutional crisis, 2015
- Polish nationalism
