= Voivodeship executive board =

Regional executive body in Poland

The voivodeship executive board (Polish: Zarząd województwa) is the regional executive body of a province in Poland. An executive board consists of five members elected by provincial assemblies and chaired by a marshal.

== See also ==
- regional assemblies
- Voivodeships of Poland
- Voivode
- Local self-government
