= Voivodeship marshal =

Polish provincial-level government head office

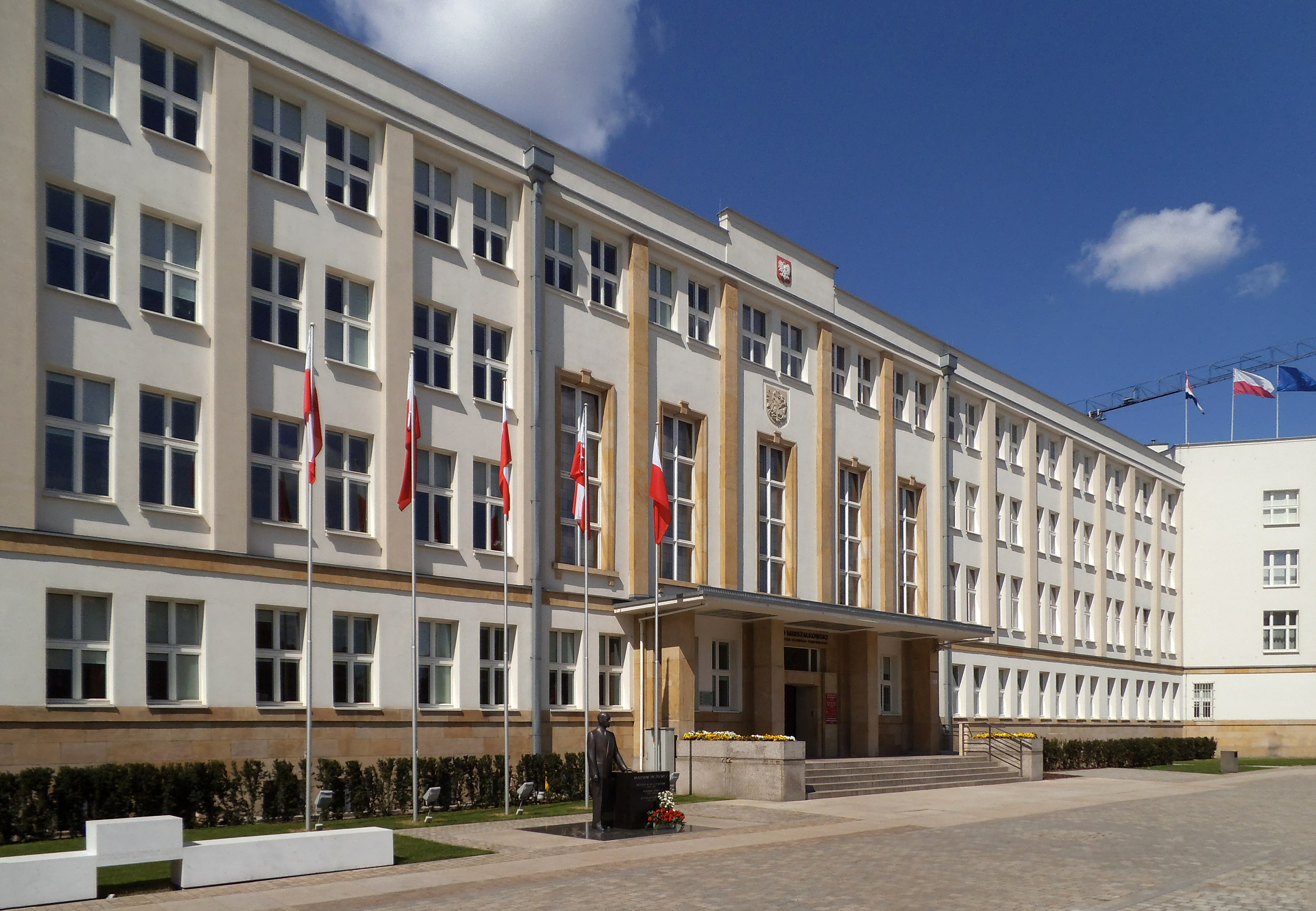
The marshal's office of Kuyavian-Pomeranian Voivodeship in Toruń.

A voivodeship marshal (Polish: marszałek województwa, pronounced [marˈʂawɛɡ vɔjɛˈvut͡stfa]) is the head of the provincial-level government for each of the sixteen voivodeships of Poland. Elected by councillors from the provincial assembly, the marshal is the head of the collective voivodeship executive board, which acts as the de facto cabinet for the region. The current competences and traditions of the contemporary voivodeship marshal stem from the Public Administrative Reform Act of 1998, which went into effect in January 1999.

== Election ==
A voivodeship marshal is elected by an absolute majority from the voivodeship sejmik in the presence of at least half of all assembly members. The marshal must be elected from among the councillors of the assembly. At most, two other vice-marshals are additionally elected to sit with the marshal on the executive board by the assembly. To dismiss the marshal, three-fifths of the sejmik must agree to his or her vote of no confidence, which will also result in the collapse of the executive board. The prime minister may dismiss the marshal for infringing a governing statute or the constitution upon request of the province's centrally-appointed voivode.

== Duties ==
As the head of the executive board, the marshal is tasked to organize the affairs of the body as well as the general governance of the voivodeship, acting as the provincial government's supreme public representative. The marshal, their respective executive boards, and the provincial assembly are further assisted by a marshal's office (Polish: urząd marszałkowski). The marshal's office provides technical, legal, organizational, and bureaucratic support for each of these bodies in the daily running of the voivodeship. In times of emergency or threats to life, public health, security, or material loss in the province, the marshal is reserved extraordinary executive powers normally reserved for the collective executive board as a whole to make decisions. However, such decisions are subject to retrospective approval immediately upon the next convening of the board. In June 2006 he received additional competences that were previously reserved for the voivode, in the field of agriculture and development of rural infrastructure, real estate and protection of agricultural land, geology, fisheries and protection of fish resources, protection of nature and forestry, and tourism.

== See also ==
- Voivodeship sejmik
- Voivode
- Voivodeship executive board

== Works cited ==
- Structure and Operation of Local and Regional Democracy: Poland, situation in 1999. Strasbourg: Council of Europe. 2000. ISBN 92-871-4313-7.
- Prokop, Krzysztof (2011). Polish Constitutional Law. Białystok: Temida 2. ISBN 978-83-62813-13-1.
