= 2018 Polish local elections =

Local elections that were held in Poland in 2018

2018 Polish regional assembly election
- 21 October 2018 (first round); 4 November 2018 (second round)

552 seats to voivodeship sejmiks, 6,170 seats to powiat councils, 39,524 seats to gmina councils, 420 seats to Warsaw district councils, and 2,475 wójts/mayors
- Registered: 30,170,012
- Turnout: 16,570,919 (54.93%) ▲7.67pp
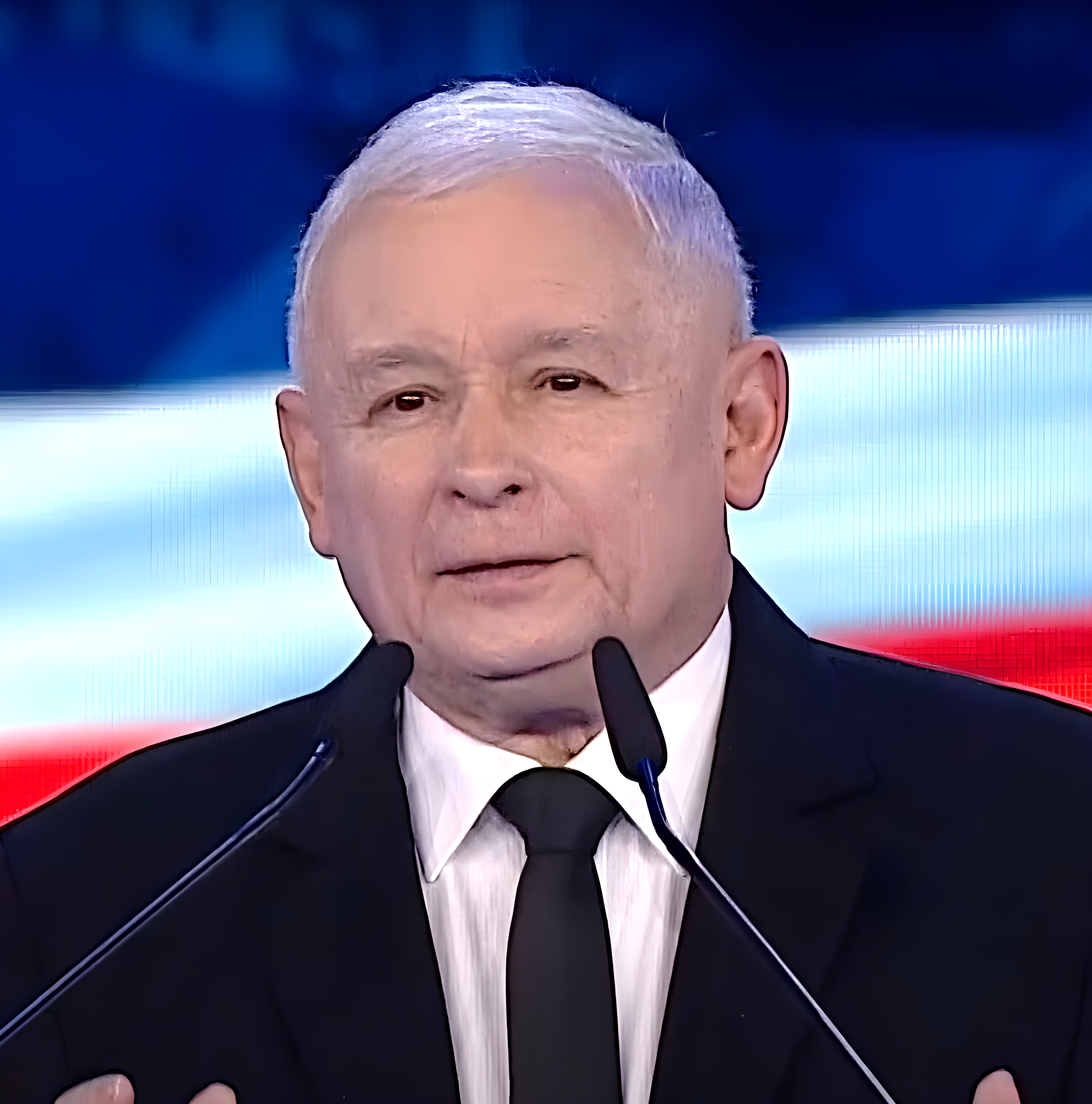

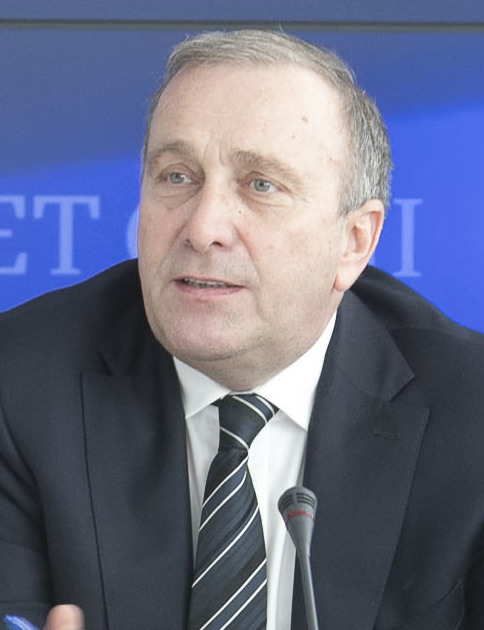

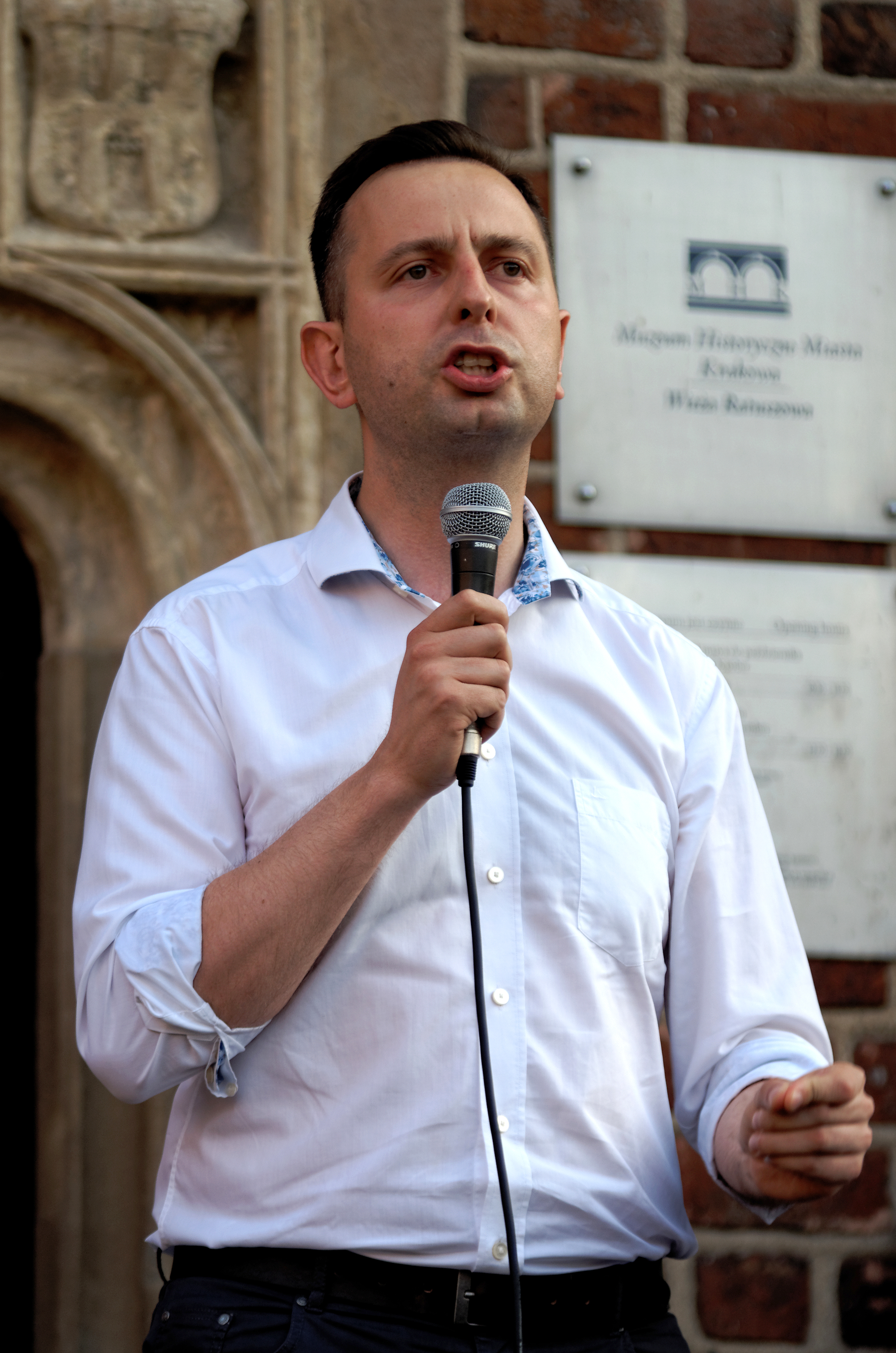

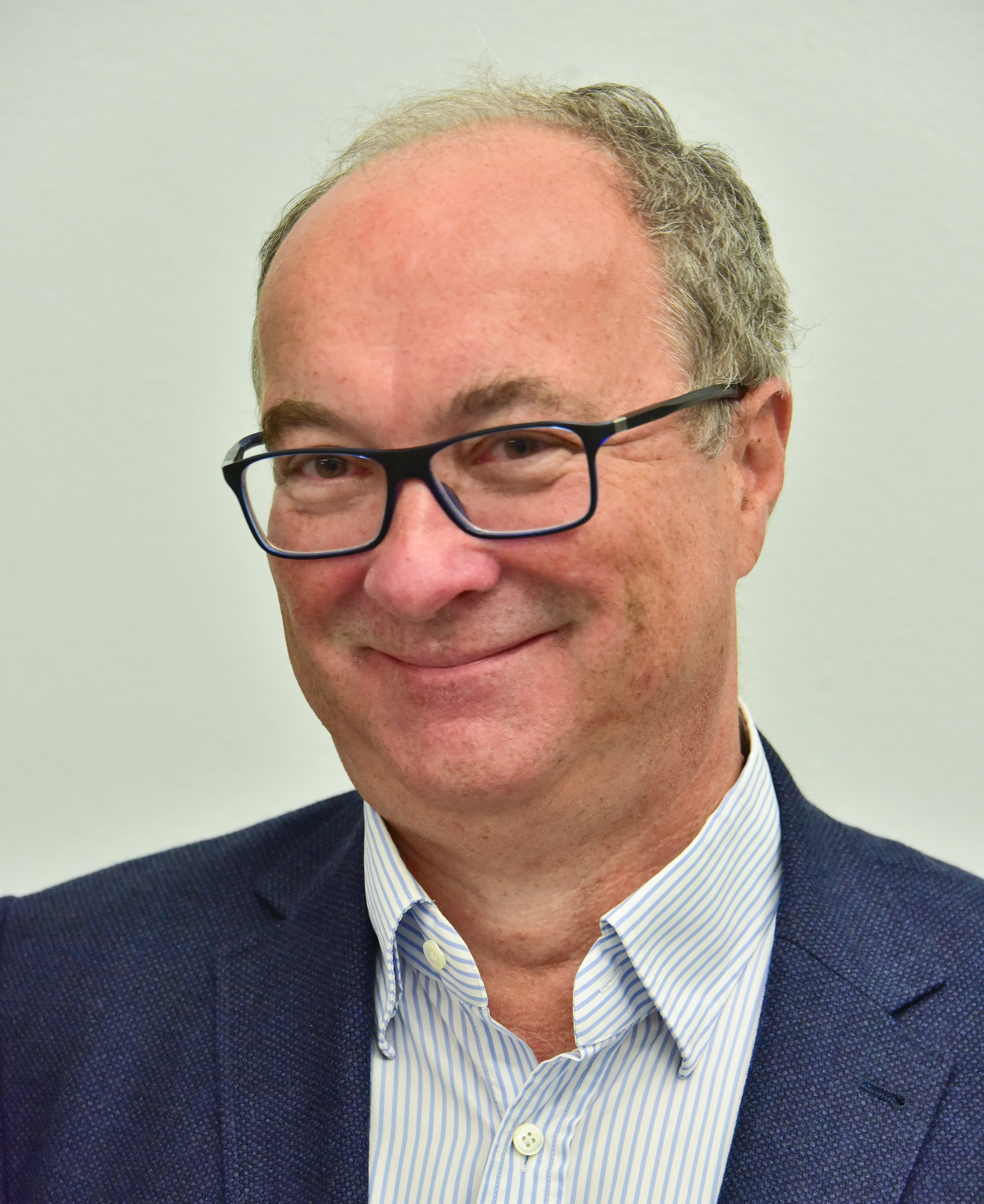

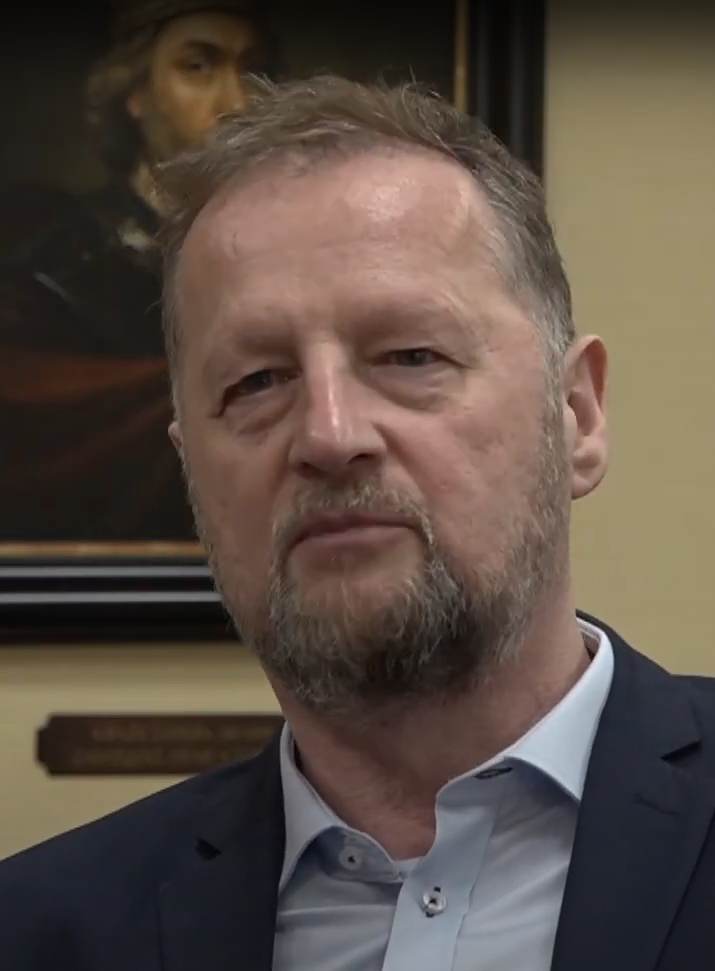

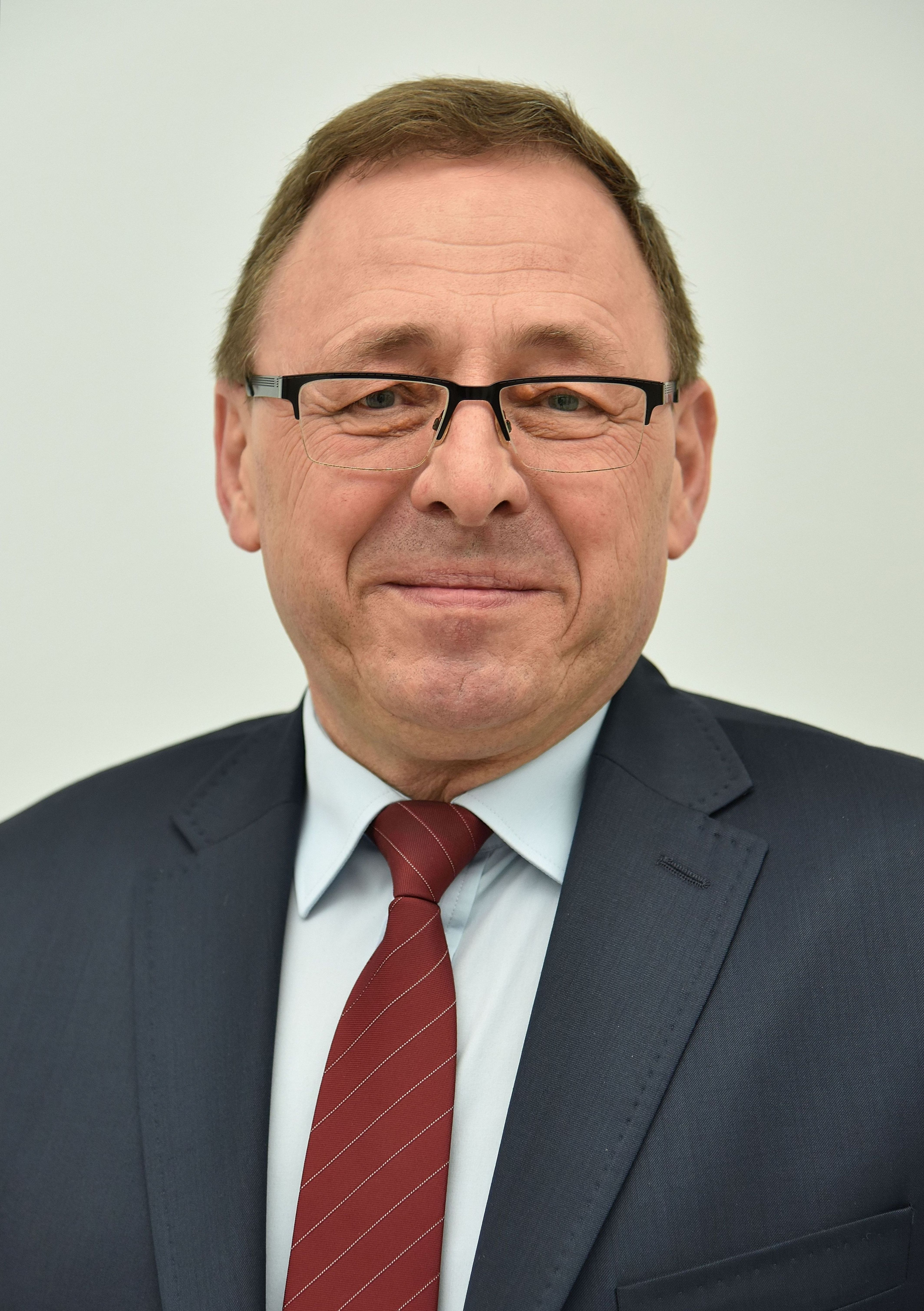
| | First party | Second party | Third party |
|---|---|---|---|
| Leader | Jarosław Kaczyński | Grzegorz Schetyna | Władysław Kosiniak-Kamysz |
| Party | PiS | P.N KO | PSL |
| Leader since | 18 January 2003 | 7 March 2018 | 7 November 2015 |
| Last election | 26.9%, 171 seats | 26.3%, 179 seats | 23.9%, 157 seats |
| Seats won | 254 | 194 | 70 |
| Seat change | ▲83 | ▲15 | ▼87 |
| Popular vote | 5,267,667 | 4,162,720 | 1,863,225 |
| Percentage | 34.1% | 27.0% | 12.1% |
| Swing | ▲7.2pp | ▲0.7pp | ▼11.8pp |
| | Fourth party | Fifth party | Sixth party |
| Leader | Włodzimierz Czarzasty | Robert Raczyński | Ryszard Galla |
| Party | SLD | BS | MN |
| Leader since | 23 January 2016 | 17 March 2017 | 25 September 2005 |
| Last election | 8.8%, 28 seats | 0.8%, 4 seats | 0.4%, 7 seats |
| Seats won | 11 | 15 | 5 |
| Seat change | ▼17 | ▲11 | ▼2 |
| Popular vote | 1,021,016 | 814,651 | 52,431 |
| Percentage | 6.6% | 5.3% | 0.3% |
| Swing | ▼2.2pp | ▲4.5pp | ▼0.1pp |
- Result of the voivodeship sejmik elections

The 2018 Polish local elections were held on October 21 for all 16 regional assemblies (sejmik wojewódzki), 380 county (powiat) councils, and 2477 municipal (gmina) councils. There were also direct elections for heads (wójt) of municipalities and mayors, with a second, run-off round for these offices on November 4.

The local elections were a victory of the ruling Law and Justice (PiS), though the opposition Civic Coalition (PO) maintained control of the majority of cities, including the capital Warsaw.

== Voivodeship councils ==
Seat allocation in voivodeship councils.

| Party | Votes | % | Seats | +/– |
|---|---|---|---|---|
| Law and Justice | 5,267,667 | 34.13 | 254 | +83 |
| Platform.Modern Civic Coalition | 4,162,720 | 26.97 | 194 | +15 |
| Polish People's Party | 1,863,225 | 12.07 | 70 | −87 |
| SLD Left Together | 1,021,016 | 6.62 | 11 | −17 |
| Kukiz'15 | 868,332 | 5.63 | 0 | New |
| Nonpartisan Local Government Activists | 814,651 | 5.28 | 15 | +11 |
| Liberty in Local Governments | 245,317 | 1.59 | 0 | New |
| Together | 242,511 | 1.57 | 0 | New |
| National Movement | 194,782 | 1.26 | 0 | 0 |
| The Greens | 177,828 | 1.15 | 0 | New |
| Free and Solidary | 119,952 | 0.78 | 0 | New |
| With Dutkiewicz for Lower Silesia | 93,260 | 0.60 | 2 | New |
| Common Lesser Poland | 61,511 | 0.40 | 0 | New |
| Silesian Regional Party | 58,126 | 0.38 | 0 | New |
| Silesians Together | 56,388 | 0.37 | 0 | New |
| German Minority | 52,431 | 0.34 | 5 | −2 |
| Świętokrzyskie Project of Bogdan Wenta | 28,314 | 0.18 | 1 | New |
| Unity of the Nation – Commonwealth | 27,415 | 0.18 | 0 | New |
| Union of Christian Families | 21,595 | 0.14 | 0 | New |
| Civic Initiative of Tarnogórski Powiat | 13,606 | 0.09 | 0 | New |
| Polish Families Together | 13,172 | 0.09 | 0 | New |
| Outside of the Clique | 8,626 | 0.06 | 0 | New |
| Spark | 8,101 | 0.05 | 0 | New |
| National Action | 5,654 | 0.04 | 0 | New |
| Slavic Union | 3,286 | 0.02 | 0 | 0 |
| Lex Naturalis | 2,120 | 0.01 | 0 | New |
| Committee of Agnieszka Jędrzejewska | 1,169 | 0.01 | 0 | New |
| Labour Party | 761 | 0.00 | 0 | New |
| Total | 15,433,536 | 100.00 | 552 | −3 |
| Valid votes | 15,433,536 | 93.14 | | |
| Invalid/blank votes | 1,137,383 | 6.86 | | |
| Total votes | 16,570,919 | 100.00 | | |
| Registered voters/turnout | 30,170,012 | 54.93 | | |
Source: National Electoral Commission

=== Election results (%) ===
| Voivodeship Council | | | | | | | | | | | | | |
| Voivodeship Council | PiS | KO | PSL | SLD | K'15 | BS | WwS | Together | RN | The Greens | WiS | Others with seats | Others |
|---|---|---|---|---|---|---|---|---|---|---|---|---|---|
| Lower Silesia | 28.53 | 25.77 | 5.23 | 5.50 | 4.78 | 14.98 | 1.38 | 1.61 | 1.32 | 1.76 | 0.86 | 8.29 (Note: With Dutkiewicz for Lower Silesia) | — |
| Kuyavia-Pomerania | 28.27 | 34.66 | 14.31 | 9.00 | 5.70 | 0.64 | 1.98 | 1.77 | 0.54 | 1.19 | 1.52 | — | 0.42 (Note: Unity of the Nation – Commonwealth) |
| Lublin | 44.04 | 18.19 | 19.30 | 5.89 | 6.64 | 0.42 | 1.62 | 0.93 | 1.32 | 0.14 | 0.77 | — | 0.74 (Note: Slavic Union) |
| Lubusz | 25.11 | 29.92 | 12.43 | 9.59 | 3.22 | 13.17 | 0.55 | 1.72 | 1.67 | 2.62 | — | — | — |
| Łódź | 34.88 | 28.39 | 13.06 | 6.32 | 5.86 | 3.90 | 1.38 | 1.72 | 1.17 | 1.34 | 1.03 | — | 0.96 (Note: National Action – 0.54, Unity of the Nation – Commonwealth – 0.42) |
| Lesser Poland | 43.55 | 22.66 | 10.03 | 2.87 | 5.76 | 3.89 | 1.80 | 1.44 | 0.86 | 1.02 | 0.91 | — | 5.23 (Note: Common Lesser Poland – 4.48, Spark – 0.59, Lex Naturalis – 0.15) |
| Masovia | 34.04 | 27.66 | 13.15 | 5.46 | 5.44 | 6.24 | 1.51 | 1.70 | 1.24 | 1.38 | 0.75 | — | 1.41 (Note: Union of Christian Families – 0.90, Unity of the Nation – Commonwealth – 0.48, Labour Party – 0.03) |
| Opole | 25.77 | 29.45 | 10.72 | 5.94 | 6.06 | 0.78 | 1.54 | 1.51 | 0.95 | 0.45 | 1.07 | 14.64 (Note: German Minority) | 1.13 (Note: Silesian Regional Party) |
| Subcarpathian | 52.25 | 13.44 | 11.88 | 5.85 | 6.62 | 3.39 | 1.77 | 1.08 | 1.92 | 0.63 | 1.16 | — | — |
| Podlaskie | 41.64 | 24.14 | 15.66 | 4.78 | 5.90 | 1.20 | 1.04 | 1.24 | 1.36 | 0.44 | 0.77 | — | 1.84 (Note: Outside of the Clique) |
| Pomerania | 27.84 | 40.70 | 8.33 | 6.59 | 5.24 | 3.03 | 2.83 | 2.21 | 1.64 | 1.59 | — | — | — |
| Silesia | 32.11 | 28.83 | 5.15 | 8.31 | 6.58 | 4.96 | 1.43 | 1.46 | 1.16 | 1.39 | 0.68 | — | 7.94 (Note: Silesians Together – 3.23, Silesian Regional Party – 3.10, Civic Initiative of Tarnogórski Powiat – 0.78, Polish Families Together – 0.76, Unity of the Nation – Commonwealth – 0.08) |
| Świętokrzyskie | 38.40 | 11.79 | 25.52 | 6.16 | 4.90 | 2.78 | 1.84 | 0.77 | 1.16 | 0.43 | 0.76 | 5.26 (Note: Świętokrzyskie Project of Bogdan Wenta) | 0.22 (Note: Committee of Agnieszka Jędrzejewska) |
| Warmia-Masuria | 28.15 | 30.40 | 19.64 | 8.16 | 6.29 | 0.79 | 0.48 | 2.31 | 2.65 | 0.45 | — | — | 0.70 (Note: Unity of the Nation – Commonwealth) |
| Greater Poland | 27.84 | 29.66 | 14.52 | 9.31 | 5.23 | 6.08 | 1.53 | 1.78 | 1.26 | 1.56 | 1.23 | — | — |
| West Pomerania | 26.80 | 32.04 | 9.68 | 9.08 | 4.21 | 13.70 | 1.94 | 1.53 | 0.73 | 0.30 | — | — | — |
| Poland | 34.13 | 26.97 | 12.07 | 6.62 | 5.63 | 5.28 | 1.59 | 1.57 | 1.26 | 1.15 | 0.78 | 1.13 | 1.81 |

=== Seats Distribution ===
| Voivodeship Council | | | | | | | | | |
| Voivodeship Council | PiS | KO | PSL | BS | SLD | MN | ZDdDŚ | PŚBW | Total |
|---|---|---|---|---|---|---|---|---|---|
| Lower Silesia | 14 | 13 | 1 | 6 | — | — | 2 | — | 36 |
| Kuyavia-Pomerania | 11 | 14 | 4 | — | 1 | — | — | — | 30 |
| Lublin | 18 | 7 | 7 | — | 1 | — | — | — | 33 |
| Lubusz | 9 | 11 | 4 | 4 | 2 | — | — | — | 30 |
| Łódź | 17 | 12 | 4 | — | — | — | — | — | 33 |
| Lesser Poland | 24 | 11 | 4 | — | — | — | — | — | 39 |
| Masovia | 24 | 18 | 8 | 1 | — | — | — | — | 51 |
| Opole | 10 | 13 | 2 | — | — | 5 | — | — | 30 |
| Subcarpathian | 25 | 5 | 3 | — | — | — | — | — | 33 |
| Podlaskie | 16 | 9 | 5 | — | — | — | — | — | 30 |
| Pomerania | 13 | 18 | 2 | — | — | — | — | — | 33 |
| Silesia | 22 | 20 | 1 | — | 2 | — | — | — | 45 |
| Świętokrzyskie | 16 | 3 | 9 | — | 1 | — | — | 1 | 30 |
| Warmia-Masuria | 11 | 12 | 7 | — | — | — | — | — | 30 |
| Greater Poland | 13 | 15 | 7 | 1 | 3 | — | — | — | 39 |
| West Pomerania | 11 | 13 | 2 | 3 | 1 | — | — | — | 30 |
| Poland | 254 | 194 | 70 | 15 | 11 | 5 | 2 | 1 | 552 |

== Powiat councils ==
| Party | Votes | % | Seats |
|---|---|---|---|
| Law and Justice | 3,224,062 | 30.46 | 2,114 |
| Polish People's Party | 1,505,277 | 14.22 | 952 |
| Platform.Modern Civic Coalition | 1,300,898 | 12.29 | 726 |
| SLD Left Together | 292,761 | 2.77 | 105 |
| Kukiz'15 | 149,893 | 1.42 | 19 |
| Nonpartisan Local Government Activists | 90,885 | 0.86 | 36 |
| German Minority | 48,911 | 0.46 | 45 |
| Common Lesser Poland | 43,514 | 0.41 | 15 |
| Jarosław Gowin's Agreement | 22,853 | 0.22 | 3 |
| Civic Initiative of Tarnogórski Powiat | 15,248 | 0.14 | 9 |
| Świętokrzyskie Project of Bogdan Wenta | 15,022 | 0.14 | 5 |
| First Self-Governance League | 10,239 | 0.10 | 5 |
| Free and Solidary | 5,735 | 0.05 | 0 |
| Silesian Regional Party | 5,361 | 0.05 | 3 |
| National Movement | 304 | 0.00 | 0 |
| Self-Defence | 300 | 0.00 | 0 |
| Other and local committees | 3,852,976 | 36.40 | 2,207 |
| Total | 10,584,239 | 100.00 | 6,244 |
| Valid votes | 10,584,239 | 94.64 | |
| Invalid/blank votes | 599,913 | 5.36 | |
| Total votes | 11,184,152 | 100.00 | |
| Registered voters/turnout | 20,471,882 | 54.63 | |
Source: National Electoral Commission

== Gmina councils ==
| Party | Votes | % | Seats |
|---|---|---|---|
| Law and Justice | 3,291,172 | 21.08 | 5,808 |
| Platform.Modern Civic Coalition | 1,768,898 | 11.33 | 1,098 |
| Polish People's Party | 682,768 | 4.37 | 3,200 |
| SLD Left Together | 382,805 | 2.45 | 307 |
| Kukiz'15 | 241,677 | 1.55 | 93 |
| Nonpartisan Local Government Activists | 79,773 | 0.51 | 53 |
| German Minority | 25,821 | 0.17 | 207 |
| Świętokrzyskie Project of Bogdan Wenta | 18,910 | 0.12 | 14 |
| Silesian Regional Party | 18,233 | 0.12 | 11 |
| Liberty in Local Governments | 17,207 | 0.11 | 3 |
| Civic Initiative of Tarnogórski Powiat | 10,370 | 0.07 | 12 |
| Free and Solidary | 8,773 | 0.06 | 13 |
| Jarosław Gowin's Agreement | 7,027 | 0.04 | 13 |
| The Greens | 6,930 | 0.04 | 0 |
| Outside of the Clique | 4,533 | 0.03 | 6 |
| First Self-Governance League | 3,131 | 0.02 | 3 |
| National Movement | 2,335 | 0.01 | 1 |
| National Action | 1,799 | 0.01 | 0 |
| Right Wing of the Republic | 1,799 | 0.01 | 9 |
| Unity of the Nation – Commonwealth | 1,797 | 0.01 | 2 |
| Common Lesser Poland | 1,601 | 0.01 | 3 |
| Self-Defence | 1,184 | 0.01 | 3 |
| People's Party "Patrimony" RP | 1,011 | 0.01 | 4 |
| Congress of the New Right | 379 | 0.00 | 1 |
| Labour Party | 345 | 0.00 | 0 |
| Democracy and Justice | 316 | 0.00 | 0 |
| Silesians Together | 203 | 0.00 | 2 |
| Union of Christian Families | 148 | 0.00 | 0 |
| Union of European Democrats | 20 | 0.00 | 0 |
| Patriotic Poland | 8 | 0.00 | 0 |
| Other and local committees | 9,035,011 | 57.86 | 28,658 |
| Total | 15,615,984 | 100.00 | 39,524 |
| Valid votes | 15,615,984 | 97.36 | |
| Invalid/blank votes | 423,946 | 2.64 | |
| Total votes | 16,039,930 | 100.00 | |
| Registered voters/turnout | 29,095,469 | 55.13 | |
Source: National Electoral Commission

== Mayors ==
| Party or alliance | | First round | | | Second round | | | Total seats |
| Party or alliance | | Votes | % | Seats | Votes | % | Seats | Total seats |
|---|---|---|---|---|---|---|---|---|
| Law and Justice | Law and Justice | 1,932,363 | 11.95 | 109 | 630,979 | 13.67 | 39 | 148 |
| Law and Justice | Solidary Poland | 272,370 | 1.68 | 0 | 7,821 | 0.17 | 2 | 2 |
| Law and Justice | Agreement | 59,521 | 0.37 | 0 | 13,048 | 0.28 | 1 | 1 |
| Law and Justice | Free and Solidary | 7,292 | 0.05 | 0 | | | | 0 |
| Law and Justice | Right Wing of the Republic | 4,232 | 0.03 | 0 | | | | 0 |
| Law and Justice | Independents | 792,663 | 4.90 | 61 | 277,081 | 6.00 | 22 | 83 |
| Law and Justice | Total | 3,068,441 | 18.98 | 170 | 928,929 | 20.13 | 64 | 234 |
| Platform.Modern Civic Coalition | Civic Platform | 1,405,310 | 8.69 | 11 | 269,020 | 5.83 | 14 | 25 |
| Platform.Modern Civic Coalition | Modern | 7,555 | 0.05 | 0 | | | | 0 |
| Platform.Modern Civic Coalition | Polish People's Party | 695 | 0.00 | 0 | | | | 0 |
| Platform.Modern Civic Coalition | Independents | 304,596 | 1.88 | 6 | 58,034 | 1.26 | 2 | 8 |
| Platform.Modern Civic Coalition | Total | 1,718,156 | 10.63 | 17 | 327,054 | 7.09 | 16 | 33 |
| Polish People's Party | Polish People's Party | 424,568 | 2.63 | 119 | 89,855 | 1.95 | 26 | 145 |
| Polish People's Party | Worthy Life | 525 | 0.00 | 0 | | | | 0 |
| Polish People's Party | Independents | 126,793 | 0.78 | 20 | 34,947 | 0.76 | 8 | 28 |
| Polish People's Party | Total | 551,886 | 3.41 | 139 | 124,802 | 2.70 | 34 | 173 |
| SLD Left Together | Democratic Left Alliance | 191,413 | 1.18 | 2 | 38,315 | 0.83 | 3 | 5 |
| SLD Left Together | Labour Union | 1,560 | 0.01 | 0 | | | | 0 |
| SLD Left Together | Independents | 22,668 | 0.14 | 0 | 4,822 | 0.10 | 1 | 1 |
| SLD Left Together | Total | 215,641 | 1.33 | 2 | 43,137 | 0.93 | 4 | 6 |
| Kukiz'15 | Congress of the New Right | 6,250 | 0.04 | 0 | | | | 0 |
| Kukiz'15 | Direct Democracy | 5,209 | 0.03 | 0 | | | | 0 |
| Kukiz'15 | Real Politics Union | 1,272 | 0.01 | 0 | | | | 0 |
| Kukiz'15 | KORWiN | 912 | 0.01 | 0 | | | | 0 |
| Kukiz'15 | Law and Justice | 328 | 0.00 | 0 | | | | 0 |
| Kukiz'15 | Self-Defence | 259 | 0.00 | 0 | | | | 0 |
| Kukiz'15 | Independents | 138,594 | 0.86 | 2 | 22,632 | 0.49 | 2 | 4 |
| Kukiz'15 | Total | 152,824 | 0.95 | 2 | 22,632 | 0.49 | 2 | 4 |
| Świętokrzyskie Project of Bogdan Wenta | Independents | 33,242 | 0.21 | 0 | 49,178 | 1.07 | 1 | 1 |
| German Minority | Regional. Minority with Majority | 4,016 | 0.02 | 2 | 948 | 0.02 | 0 | 2 |
| German Minority | Independents | 28,092 | 0.17 | 7 | 5,516 | 0.12 | 4 | 11 |
| German Minority | Total | 32,108 | 0.20 | 9 | 6,464 | 0.14 | 4 | 13 |
| Liberty in Local Governments | KORWiN | 11,516 | 0.07 | 0 | | | | 0 |
| Liberty in Local Governments | Independents | 16,694 | 0.10 | 0 | | | | 0 |
| Liberty in Local Governments | Total | 28,210 | 0.17 | 0 | | | | 0 |
| Nonpartisan Local; Government Activists | Independents | 26,850 | 0.17 | 1 | 8,305 | 0.18 | 2 | 3 |
| Silesian Regional Party | Silesian Regional Party | 8,962 | 0.06 | 0 | | | | 0 |
| Silesian Regional Party | Independents | 6,984 | 0.04 | 0 | 2,116 | 0.05 | 1 | 1 |
| Silesian Regional Party | Total | 15,946 | 0.10 | 0 | 2,116 | 0.05 | 1 | 1 |
| Civic Initiative of Tarnogórski Powiat | Independents | 15,670 | 0.10 | 1 | | | | 1 |
| Free and Solidary | Free and Solidary | 1,321 | 0.01 | 0 | | | | 0 |
| Free and Solidary | Law and Justice | 223 | 0.00 | 0 | | | | 0 |
| Free and Solidary | Independents | 6,126 | 0.04 | 0 | 1,317 | 0.03 | 1 | 1 |
| Free and Solidary | Total | 7,670 | 0.05 | 0 | 1,317 | 0.03 | 1 | 1 |
| Jarosław Gowin's Agreement | Agreement | 2,712 | 0.02 | 0 | 1,498 | 0.03 | 0 | 0 |
| Jarosław Gowin's Agreement | Law and Justice | 930 | 0.01 | 0 | | | | 0 |
| Jarosław Gowin's Agreement | Independents | 3,085 | 0.02 | 0 | | | | 0 |
| Jarosław Gowin's Agreement | Total | 6,727 | 0.04 | 0 | 1,498 | 0.03 | 0 | 0 |
| The Greens | The Greens | 3,487 | 0.02 | 0 | | | | 0 |
| Outside of the Clique | Independents | 2,842 | 0.02 | 0 | | | | 0 |
| Unity of the Nation – Commonwealth | Independents | 2,737 | 0.02 | 0 | | | | 0 |
| National Movement | National Movement | 1,763 | 0.01 | 0 | | | | 0 |
| Right Wing of the Republic | Right Wing of the Republic | 140 | 0.00 | 0 | | | | 0 |
| Right Wing of the Republic | Independents | 899 | 0.01 | 0 | | | | 0 |
| Right Wing of the Republic | Total | 1,039 | 0.01 | 0 | | | | 0 |
| Congress of the New Right | Congress of the New Right | 986 | 0.01 | 0 | | | | 0 |
| National Action | Independents | 713 | 0.00 | 0 | | | | 0 |
| Labour Party | Independents | 628 | 0.00 | 0 | | | | 0 |
| Common Lesser Poland | Independents | 527 | 0.00 | 0 | | | | 0 |
| Self-Defence | Self-Defence | 371 | 0.00 | 0 | | | | 0 |
| Democracy and Justice | Independents | 348 | 0.00 | 0 | | | | 0 |
| People's Party "Patrimony" RP | Independents | 118 | 0.00 | 0 | | | | 0 |
| Other and local committees | Civic Platform (Note: Includes 26,781 votes and 2 seats in the first round for supported independents.) | 934,974 | 5.78 | 82 | 159,424 | 3.45 | 23 | 105 |
| Other and local committees | Polish People's Party (Note: Includes 604 votes and 0 seats in the first round; 645 votes and 0 seats in the second round for a supported independent.) | 462,748 | 2.86 | 108 | 141,179 | 3.06 | 33 | 141 |
| Other and local committees | Law and Justice (Note: Includes 116,916 votes and 27 seats in the first round; 22,159 votes and 6 seats in the second round for supported independents.) | 354,416 | 2.19 | 60 | 108,701 | 2.36 | 22 | 82 |
| Other and local committees | Democratic Left Alliance | 239,682 | 1.48 | 24 | 71,610 | 1.55 | 9 | 33 |
| Other and local committees | Agreement (Note: Includes 766 votes and 0 seats in the first round; 1,005 votes and 1 seat in the second round for a supported independent.) | 55,829 | 0.35 | 8 | 10,948 | 0.24 | 2 | 10 |
| Other and local committees | Modern | 37,916 | 0.23 | 2 | 9,002 | 0.20 | 1 | 3 |
| Other and local committees | KORWiN | 26,594 | 0.16 | 0 | | | | 0 |
| Other and local committees | Solidary Poland (Note: Includes 2,076 votes and 1 seat in the first round for supported independents.) | 16,015 | 0.10 | 1 | 11,890 | 0.26 | 4 | 5 |
| Other and local committees | Right Wing of the Republic | 13,528 | 0.08 | 2 | | | | 2 |
| Other and local committees | Labour Union | 9,405 | 0.06 | 1 | 2,085 | 0.05 | 1 | 2 |
| Other and local committees | Together | 8,475 | 0.05 | 0 | 2,072 | 0.04 | 1 | 1 |
| Other and local committees | Social Justice Movement | 7,271 | 0.04 | 0 | | | | 0 |
| Other and local committees | Regional. Minority with Majority | 6,644 | 0.04 | 1 | | | | 1 |
| Other and local committees | Feminist Initiative | 4,913 | 0.03 | 0 | | | | 0 |
| Other and local committees | Free and Solidary (Note: Includes 429 votes and 0 seats in the first round for a supported independent.) | 4,563 | 0.03 | 0 | | | | 0 |
| Other and local committees | Direct Democracy | 3,745 | 0.02 | 0 | | | | 0 |
| Other and local committees | Piast Faction | 2,235 | 0.01 | 1 | | | | 1 |
| Other and local committees | Second Polish Republic | 2,117 | 0.01 | 0 | | | | 0 |
| Other and local committees | National Movement | 1,643 | 0.01 | 0 | | | | 0 |
| Other and local committees | Silesians Together | 1,034 | 0.01 | 0 | | | | 0 |
| Other and local committees | Alliance of Democrats | 687 | 0.00 | 0 | | | | 0 |
| Other and local committees | Labour Party | 628 | 0.00 | 0 | | | | 0 |
| Other and local committees | Self-Defence | 63 | 0.00 | 0 | | | | 0 |
| Other and local committees | Independents | 8,083,790 | 50.00 | 1,195 | 2,583,095 | 55.97 | 424 | 1,619 |
| Other and local committees | Total | 10,278,914 | 63.58 | 1485 | 3,100,006 | 67.17 | 520 | 2005 |
| Total | | 16,167,845 | 100.00 | 1,826 | 4,615,438 | 100.00 | 649 | 2,475 |
| Valid votes | | 16,167,844 | 98.84 | | 4,615,438 | 99.28 | | |
| Invalid/blank votes | | 189,470 | 1.16 | | 33,706 | 0.72 | | |
| Total votes | | 16,357,314 | 100.00 | | 4,649,144 | 100.00 | | |
| Registered voters/turnout | | 30,115,896 | 54.31 | | 9,523,401 | 48.82 | | |
Source: National Electoral Commission

=== Total elected mayors by alliance and party ===
| Party or alliance | | Seats |
|---|---|---|
| United Right | Law and Justice | 197 |
| United Right | Agreement | 11 |
| United Right | Solidary Poland | 7 |
| United Right | Right Wing of the Republic | 2 |
| United Right | Piast Faction | 1 |
| United Right | Independents | 116 |
| United Right | Total | 334 |
| Polish People's Party | Polish People's Party | 286 |
| Polish People's Party | Independents | 28 |
| Polish People's Party | Total | 314 |
| Platform.Modern; Civic Coalition | Civic Platform | 128 |
| Platform.Modern; Civic Coalition | Modern | 3 |
| Platform.Modern; Civic Coalition | Independents | 10 |
| Platform.Modern; Civic Coalition | Total | 141 |
| SLD Left Together | Democratic Left Alliance | 38 |
| SLD Left Together | Labour Union | 2 |
| SLD Left Together | Independents | 1 |
| SLD Left Together | Total | 41 |
| German Minority | Regional. Minority with Majority | 3 |
| German Minority | Independents | 11 |
| German Minority | Total | 14 |
| Kukiz'15 | Independents | 4 |
| Nonpartisan Local; Government Activists | Independents | 3 |
| Świętokrzyskie Project of Bogdan Wenta | Independents | 1 |
| Silesian Regional Party | Independents | 1 |
| Civic Initiative of Tarnogórski Powiat | Independents | 1 |
| Free and Solidary | Independents | 1 |
| Other and local committees | Together | 1 |
| Other and local committees | Independents | 1,619 |
| Other and local committees | Total | 1620 |
| Total | | 2,475 |
Source: National Electoral Commission

== Voivodeship capital mayoral elections ==
Source: National Electoral Commission

Bold – elected candidates

=== Warsaw ===
Warsaw Mayor

| Candidate | Party | Votes | % |
|---|---|---|---|
| **Rafał Trzaskowski** | Platform.Modern Civic Coalition (PO) | 505,187 | 56.67 |
| Patryk Jaki | Law and Justice (SP) | 254,324 | 28.53 |
| Jan Śpiewak | Jan Śpiewak Committee Warsaw Will Win (Ind.) | 26,689 | 2.99 |
| Marek Jakubiak | Kukiz'15 (Ind.) | 26,660 | 2.99 |
| Justyna Glusman | The City Is Ours – City Movements (Ind.) | 20,643 | 2.32 |
| Andrzej Rozenek | SLD Left Together (SLD) | 13,370 | 1.50 |
| Janusz Korwin-Mikke | Liberty in Local Governments (KORWiN) | 11,516 | 1.29 |
| Jacek Wojciechowicz | Jacek Wojciechowicz Committee Action Warsaw (Ind.) | 9,002 | 1.01 |
| Piotr Ikonowicz | Social Justice Committee of Piotr Ikonowicz (RSS) | 7,271 | 0.82 |
| Sławomir Antonik | Nonpartisan Local Government Activists (Ind.) | 6,457 | 0.72 |
| Paweł Tanajno | "De-Jam Warsaw RIGCZ Tanajno Hawaiian+" Committee (Direct Democracy) | 3,745 | 0.42 |
| Jakub Stefaniak | Polish People's Party (PSL) | 2,793 | 0.31 |
| Jan Zbigniew Potocki | II Polish Republic | 2,117 | 0.24 |
| Krystyna Krzekotowska | Poles World Congress (Ind.) | 1,604 | 0.18 |
| **Total** | | **891,378** | **100.00** |
Source: National Electoral Commission

Warsaw City Council

| Party | Votes | % | Seats |
|---|---|---|---|
| Platform.Modern Civic Coalition | 384,322 | 43.96 | 40 |
| Law and Justice | 223,023 | 25.51 | 19 |
| SLD Left Together | 50,085 | 5.73 | 1 |
| The City Is Ours – City Movements | 50,002 | 5.72 | 0 |
| Others (Below 5%) | 166,756 | 19.08 | 0 |
| **Total** | **874,188** | **100.00** | **60** |
Source: National Electoral Commission

=== Kraków ===
Kraków Mayor

| Candidate | Party | First round | | Second round | |
| Candidate | Party | Votes | % | Votes | % |
|---|---|---|---|---|---|
| **Jacek Majchrowski** (incumbent) | Committee of Jacek Majchrowski – Civic Kraków (Ind.) (Note: Supported by PO, .N, PSL and SLD) | 154,830 | 45.84 | 197,019 | 61.94 |
| Małgorzata Wassermann | Law and Justice | 107,696 | 31.88 | 121,083 | 38.06 |
| Łukasz Gibała | Committee of Łukasz Gibała – Kraków for Residents (Ind.) | 57,901 | 17.14 | | |
| Konrad Berkowicz | "Modern Kraków" Committee of Konrad Berkowicz (KORWiN) | 8,458 | 2.50 | | |
| Daria Gosek-Popiołek | Together for Kraków | 4,659 | 1.38 | | |
| Jolanta Gajęcka | Kukiz'15 (Ind.) | 4,237 | 1.25 | | |
| **Total** | | **337,781** | **100.00** | **318,102** | **100.00** |
Source: National Electoral Commission

Kraków City Council

| Party | Votes | % | Seats |
|---|---|---|---|
| Committee of Jacek Majchrowski – Civic Kraków | 143,883 | 43.65 | 23 |
| Law and Justice | 98,305 | 29.82 | 16 |
| Committee of Łukasz Gibała – Kraków for Residents | 41,953 | 12.73 | 4 |
| Others (Below 5%) | 45,520 | 13.81 | 0 |
| **Total** | **329,661** | **100.00** | **43** |

=== Wrocław ===
Wrocław Mayor

| Candidate | Party | Votes | % |
|---|---|---|---|
| **Jacek Sutryk** | Platform.Modern Civic Coalition | 129,669 | 50.20 |
| Mirosława Stachowiak-Różecka | Law and Justice | 71,049 | 27.50 |
| Katarzyna Obara-Kowalska | Nonpartisan Wrocław | 19,063 | 7.38 |
| Jerzy Michalak | Nonpartisan Citizens Movement Committee of Jerzy Michalak | 17,890 | 6.93 |
| Zbigniew Jarząbek | Kukiz'15 (KNP) | 6,250 | 2.42 |
| Marta Lempart | Wrocław for Everyone Committee | 6,046 | 2.34 |
| Małgorzata Tracz | Zieloni | 3,487 | 1.35 |
| Robert Bogusławski | Jarek Bogusławski Committee | 2,359 | 0.91 |
| Artur Zborowski | We Are From Here Committee | 1,593 | 0.62 |
| Mieczysław Maj | Free and Solidary | 918 | 0.36 |
| **Total** | | **258,324** | **100.00** |
Source: National Electoral Commission

=== Łódź ===
Łódź Mayor

| Candidate | Party | Votes | % |
|---|---|---|---|
| **Hanna Zdanowska** (incumbent) | Committee of Hanna Zdanowska (PO) | 215,323 | 70.22 |
| Waldemar Buda | Law and Justice | 72,509 | 23.65 |
| Rafał Górski | Kukiz'15 | 6,019 | 1.96 |
| Agnieszka Wojciechowska van Heukelom | Committee of Agnieszka Wojciechowska van Heukelom – Nonpartisans (Ind.) | 4,039 | 1.32 |
| Urszula Niziołek-Janiak | "Yes!" Committee | 3,398 | 1.11 |
| Krzysztof Lipczyk | Liberty #MuremZaŁodzią (KORWiN) | 2,866 | 0.93 |
| Piotr Misztal | Nonpartisans – Piotr Misztal Committee | 1,449 | 0.47 |
| Zbigniew Maurer | National Action Committee | 713 | 0.23 |
| Janusz Rutkowski | Law and Power Committee | 332 | 0.11 |
| **Total** | | **306,648** | **100.00** |
Source: National Electoral Commission

=== Poznań ===
Poznań Mayor

| Candidate | Party | Votes | % |
|---|---|---|---|
| **Jacek Jaśkowiak** (incumbent) | Platform.Modern Civic Coalition | 127,125 | 55.99 |
| Tadeusz Zysk | Law and Justice | 48,374 | 21.31 |
| Tomasz Lewandowski | The Left (Note: Joint committee of SLD and Razem) | 17,402 | 7.66 |
| Jarosław Pucek | Committee of Jarosław Pucek – City's Interest | 16,903 | 7.45 |
| Dorota Bonk-Hammermeister | Social Coalition "The Right for the City" | 7,963 | 3.51 |
| Przemysław Hinc | Kukiz'15 (Direct Democracy) | 5,209 | 2.29 |
| Wojciech Bratkowski | Poznań All Over Again Social Initiative | 4,060 | 1.79 |
| **Total** | | **227,036** | **100.00** |

=== Gdańsk ===
Gdańsk Mayor

| Candidate | Party | First round | | Second round | |
| Candidate | Party | Votes | % | Votes | % |
|---|---|---|---|---|---|
| **Paweł Adamowicz** (incumbent) | Committee of Paweł Adamowicz – Everything for Gdańsk | 77,966 | 36.97 | 129,683 | 64.80 |
| Kacper Płażyński | Law and Justice | 62,594 | 29.68 | 70,432 | 35.20 |
| Jarosław Wałęsa | Platform.Modern Civic Coalition | 58,561 | 27.77 | | |
| Jacek Hołubowski | Gdańsk Is Created by the Citizens Committee | 4,170 | 1.98 | | |
| Elżbieta Jachlewska | Social Movement Better Gdańsk (IF) | 4,146 | 1.97 | | |
| Andrzej Ceynowa | SLD Left Together | 2,036 | 0.97 | | |
| Dorota Maksymowicz-Czapkowska | Polish National Front of Wojciech Olszański | 1,427 | 0.68 | | |
| **Total** | | **210,900** | **100.00** | **200,115** | **100.00** |

Early mayoral elections — March 3, 2020

Early mayoral election were held in Gdańsk following the Assassination of Paweł Adamowicz. Aleksandra Dulkiewicz, Acting Mayor of Gdańsk was elected in the first round.

| Candidate | Party | Votes | % |
|---|---|---|---|
| **Aleksandra Dulkiewicz** (incumbent caretaker) | Everything for Gdańsk A. Dulkiewicz Committee (Note: Supported by PO, .N, PSL and Wiosna) | 139,790 | 82.22 |
| Grzegorz Braun | Committee of Grzegorz Braun (Note: Supported by KORWiN and RN) | 20,164 | 11.86 |
| Marek Skiba | Responsibles-Gdańsk (Note: Endorsed by the 2018 PiS Mayor Candidate Kacper Płażyński) | 10,074 | 5.92 |
| **Total** | | **170,028** | **100.00** |

=== Szczecin ===
Szczecin Mayor

| Candidate | Party | First round | | Second round | |
| Candidate | Party | Votes | % | Votes | % |
|---|---|---|---|---|---|
| **Piotr Krzystek** (incumbent) | Committee of Piotr Krzystek – Nontpartisans | 73,063 | 47.25 | 100,465 | 78.22 |
| Bartłomiej Sochański | Law and Justice | 34,005 | 21.99 | 27,966 | 21.78 |
| Sławomir Nitras | Platform.Modern Civic Coalition | 33,723 | 21.81 | | |
| Dawid Krystek | SLD Left Together | 5,828 | 3.77 | | |
| Piotr Czypicki | Szczecin City Movement | 4,805 | 3.11 | | |
| Jakub Kozieł | Anti-Establishment Coalition Committee | 3,195 | 2.07 | | |
| **Total** | | **154,619** | **100.00** | **128,431** | **100.00** |

=== Bydgoszcz ===
Bydgoszcz Mayor

| Candidate | Party | Votes | % |
|---|---|---|---|
| **Rafał Bruski** (incumbent) | Platform.Modern Civic Coalition (PO) | 76,435 | 54.64 |
| Tomasz Latos | Law and Justice | 41,407 | 29.60 |
| Marcin Sypniewski | Time for Bydgoszcz CB2018.PL (KORWiN) | 8,638 | 6.17 |
| Anna Mackiewicz | SLD Left Together (SLD) | 8,503 | 6.08 |
| Paweł Skutecki | Kukiz'15 (Ind.) | 4,914 | 3.51 |
| **Total** | | **139,897** | **100.00** |

=== Lublin ===
Lublin Mayor

| Candidate | Party | Votes | % |
|---|---|---|---|
| **Krzysztof Żuk** (incumbent) | Krzysztof Żuk Committee (PO) | 89,488 | 62.32 |
| Sylwester Tułajew | Law and Justice | 45,202 | 31.48 |
| Jakub Kulesza | Kukiz, Liberty, Lublin Patriots and City Movements Committee | 4,290 | 2.99 |
| Magdalena Długosz | City for the People – Lublin City Movement Committee | 2,143 | 1.49 |
| Marian Kowalski | ″We From Lublin″ Committee | 1,929 | 1.34 |
| Joanna Kunc | Joanna Kunc WIS Lublin Kornel Morawiecki | 532 | 0.37 |
| **Total** | | **143,584** | **100.00** |

=== Białystok ===
Białystok Mayor

| Candidate | Party | Votes | % |
|---|---|---|---|
| **Tadeusz Truskolaski** (incumbent) | Platform.Modern Civic Coalition | 66,498 | 56.21 |
| Jacek Żalek | Law and Justice (PJG) | 35,735 | 30.21 |
| Tadeusz Arłukowicz | Committee of Tadeusz Arłukowicz "Białystok on Yes" | 9,378 | 7.93 |
| Katarzyna Sztop-Rutkowska | Initiative for Białystok Committee | 4,963 | 4.20 |
| Stanisław Bartnik | Outside of the Clique Committee | 1,726 | 1.46 |
| **Total** | | **118,300** | **100.00** |

=== Katowice ===
Katowice Mayor

| Candidate | Party | Votes | % |
|---|---|---|---|
| **Marcin Krupa** (incumbent) | Local Government Forum and Marcin Krupa (Ind.) (Note: Supported by PiS and SLD) | 64,941 | 55.41 |
| Jarosław Makowski | Platform.Modern Civic Coalition (PO) | 28,254 | 24.11 |
| Jarosław Gwizdak | "The Right for the Katowice" | 12,461 | 10.63 |
| Ilona Kanclerz | Silesian Regional Party | 7,064 | 6.03 |
| Adam Słomka | Confederation – Movement for the Control of the Government | 2,098 | 1.79 |
| Jakub Kalus | National Movement | 1,763 | 1.50 |
| Mirosław Korbasiewicz | Labour Party | 628 | 0.54 |
| **Total** | | **117,209** | **100.00** |

=== Toruń ===
Toruń Mayor

| Candidate | Party | Votes | % |
|---|---|---|---|
| **Michał Zaleski** (incumbent) | Committee of Michał Zaleski (Ind.) | 44,840 | 55.42 |
| Tomasz Lenz | Platform.Modern Civic Coalition (PO) | 19,238 | 23.78 |
| Zbigniew Rasielewski | Law and Justice | 6,884 | 8.51 |
| Sylwia Kowalska | We Toruń Committee | 5,655 | 6.99 |
| Sławomir Mentzen | Sławomir Mentzen Committee (KORWiN) | 3,184 | 3.94 |
| Irena Paczkowska | Kukiz'15 | 1,103 | 1.36 |
| **Total** | | **80,904** | **100.00** |

=== Rzeszów ===
Rzeszów Mayor

| Candidate | Party | Votes | % |
|---|---|---|---|
| **Tadeusz Ferenc** (incumbent) | Development of Rzeszów Association of Tadeusz Ferenc in Rzeszów (SLD) | 51,029 | 63.76 |
| Wojciech Buczak | Law and Justice | 23,100 | 28.86 |
| Maciej Masłowski | Kukiz'15 | 2,868 | 3.58 |
| Krzysztof Kaszuba | Liberty in Local Governments | 2,045 | 2.56 |
| Łukasz Belter | Congress of the New Right | 986 | 1.23 |
| **Total** | | **80,028** | **100.00** |

Early mayoral elections — June 13, 2021

Early mayoral election were held in Rzeszów following the resignation of Tadeusz Ferenc. Supported by the then-opposition parties (Civic Coalition, The Left, PSL and PL2050) candidate Konrad Fijołek won the election in the first round with 56,51% of the votes.

=== Kielce ===
Kielce Mayor

| Candidate | Party | First round | | Second round | |
| Candidate | Party | Votes | % | Votes | % |
|---|---|---|---|---|---|
| **Bogdan Wenta** | Świętokrzyskie Project of Bogdan Wenta | 32,913 | 37.62 | 49,178 | 61.25 |
| Wojciech Lubawski (incumbent) | Local Government Agreement W. Lubawski (Note: Supported by PiS) | 25,552 | 29.20 | 31,114 | 38.75 |
| Piotr Liroy-Marzec | Liberty in Local Governments | 14,016 | 16.02 | | |
| Artur Gierada | Platform.Modern Civic Coalition (PO) | 6,503 | 7.43 | | |
| Krzysztof Adamczyk | Polish People's Party | 3,899 | 4.46 | | |
| Marcin Chłodnicki | SLD Left Together (SLD) | 3,609 | 4.12 | | |
| Arkadiusz Jelonek | Nonpartisan Local Government Activists | 1,001 | 1.14 | | |
| **Total** | | **87,493** | **100.00** | **80,292** | **100.00** |

=== Olsztyn ===
Olsztyn Mayor

| Candidate | Party | First round | | Second round | |
| Candidate | Party | Votes | % | Votes | % |
|---|---|---|---|---|---|
| **Piotr Grzymowicz** (incumbent) | Committee of Piotr Grzymowicz | 24,758 | 33.78 | 34,444 | 54.47 |
| Czesław Małkowski | Committee of Czesław Jerzy Małkowski | 22,465 | 30.66 | 28,791 | 45.53 |
| Michał Wypij | Law and Justice (PJG) | 13,924 | 19.00 | | |
| Monika Falej | "Common Olsztyn" Committee | 4,568 | 6.23 | | |
| Beata Bublewicz | Platform.Modern Civic Coalition (PO) | 3,903 | 5.33 | | |
| Krzysztof Kacprzycki | SLD Left Together (SLD) | 1,528 | 2.09 | | |
| Andrzej Maciejewski | Kukiz'15 | 1,155 | 1.58 | | |
| Tomasz Pitura | "Olsztyn I Love" Committee | 982 | 1.34 | | |
| **Total** | | **73,283** | **100.00** | **63,235** | **100.00** |

=== Gorzów Wielkopolski ===
Gorzów Wielkopolski Mayor

| Candidate | Party | Votes | % |
|---|---|---|---|
| **Jacek Wójcicki** (incumbent) | Committee of Jacek Wójcicki (Ind.) | 31,425 | 65.21 |
| Sebastian Pieńkowski | Law and Justice | 7,342 | 15.23 |
| Marta Bejnar-Bejnarowicz | I Love Gorzów (Ind.) | 4,891 | 10.15 |
| Robert Surowiec | Platform.Modern Civic Coalition (PO) | 4,089 | 8.48 |
| Ryszard Kneć | Fans of Gorzów (Ind.) | 446 | 0.93 |
| **Total** | | **48,193** | **100.00** |

=== Zielona Góra ===
Zielona Góra Mayor

| Candidate | Party | Votes | % |
|---|---|---|---|
| **Janusz Kubicki** (incumbent) | Janusz Kubicki - Nonpartisans Committee | 34,579 | 58.20 |
| Piotr Barczak | Law and Justice | 10,645 | 17.92 |
| Anita Kucharska-Dziedzic | City Movement Zielona Góra | 6,235 | 10.49 |
| Tomasz Nesterowicz | SLD Left Together (SLD) | 4,620 | 7.78 |
| Sławomir Kotylak | Platform.Modern Civic Coalition (PO) | 3,336 | 5.61 |
| **Total** | | **59,415** | **100.00** |

=== Opole ===
Opole Mayor

| Candidate | Party | Votes | % |
|---|---|---|---|
| **Arkadiusz Wiśniewski** (incumbent) | Committee of Arkadiusz Wiśniewski | 38,285 | 70.35 |
| Violetta Porowska | Law and Justice | 6,289 | 11.56 |
| Barbara Kamińska | Platform.Modern Civic Coalition (PO) | 5,890 | 10.82 |
| Marcin Gambiec | Committee of Marcin Gambiec (RMW) | 1,886 | 3.47 |
| Paweł Grabowski | Kukiz'15 | 1,050 | 1.93 |
| Apolonia Klepacz | SLD Left Together (SLD) | 1,020 | 1.87 |
| **Total** | | **54,420** | **100.00** |
