= Glusman =

Glusman is a surname. Notable people with the surname include:

- John Glusman, editor and writer
- Justyna Glusman (born 1974), Polish economist
- Karl Glusman (born 1988), American actor
