= Świętokrzyskie Project =

Regional liberal Polish political party

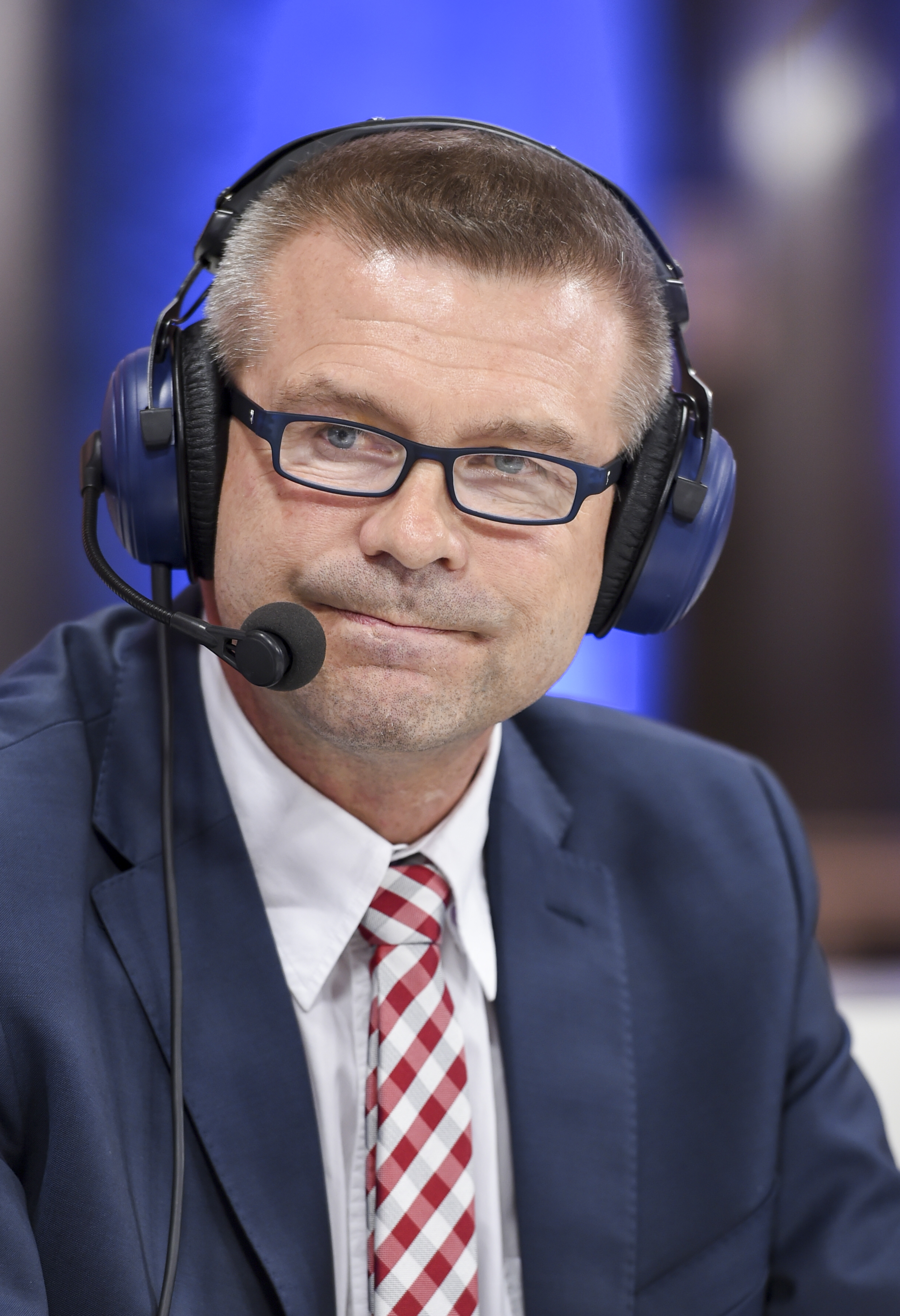
- Abbreviation: PŚ
- Formation: 2016
- Type: self-government and social association
- Purpose: political activity
- Headquarters: Kielce, PL
- Website: projektswietokrzyskie.pl

Świętokrzyskie Project - social association created in 2016 by former MEP, currently president of Kielce, Bogdan Wenta. The Association operates only in the Świętokrzyskie Province. The new organization consisted of former Civic Platform activists, members of the KOD and local non-party activists. The association is described as liberal and strongly pro-market.

In the 2018 local government elections in Poland, the association received 1 seat in the Świętokrzyskie Regional Assembly, 7 seats in the elections to the city council of Kielce, 4 seats in the council of the Kielce County, 1 seat in the council of the Opatów County and 7 seats in the municipal councils. Bogdan Wenta became president of the Kielce, gaining 37.62% in the first round and 61.25% in the second round, in both of them defeating PiS candidate Wojciech Lubawski, who ruled the city since 2002.
