= MJN =

MJN may refer to:

- MJN, IATA airport code for Amborovy Airport
- Mead Johnson Nutrition, an American manufacturer of infant formula
- MJN Air, a fictional airline in the radio series, Cabin Pressure
- MJN v News Group Newspapers Ltd, a 2011 privacy case in English law decided by the High Court of Justice
- MJN, abbreviation of Warsaw-based association Miasto Jest Nasze
