= Common Powiat =

Common Powiat Wspólny Powiat
- Abbreviation: WP
- Leader: Zygmunt Worsa
- Chairperson: Bogusław Wojskowicz
- Founded: 29 January 2014
- Headquarters: Kalno 46/2; 58-130 Żarów
- Membership (2014): 54
- Ideology: Silesian localism Silesian regionalism Pro-Europeanism; Economic interventionism
- Political position: Centre-left
- National affiliation: Civic Platform; Democratic Left Alliance
- Colours: Red
- Sejm: 0 / 460
- Senate: 0 / 100
- European Parliament: 0 / 51
- Regional assemblies: 0 / 552
- City presidents: 0 / 117
- Politics of Poland; Political parties; Elections; Mistakenly referred to as Active Local Politicians (Polish: Aktywni Samorządowcy) in 2019.

The Common Powiat (Polish: Wspólny Powiat, WP) is a local Polish party from the Świdnica County. It was founded in January 2014 by the incumbent starosta of Świdnica, Zygmunt Worsa. The activities of the party are limited to the Świdnica County in Lower Silesia, and the party focuses on local matters regarding Świdnica and Silesia. The party consists of local politicians of the county, including former members of the Civic Platform, Law and Justice and Together. The party cooperates with the Civic Platform and the Democratic Left Alliance and formed a local coalition with these parties, and Common Powiat also expressed its national support for these parties.

In the 2014 Polish local elections to the county council of Świdnica, Common Powiat emerged as the second largest party ex aequo with the Civic Platform (both parties won four seats), while the Polish People's Party became the largest party with five seats. This outcome led to a compromise government, where Zygmunt Worsa lost his position as Starosta of Świdnica and became the Vice-Starosta instead. Piotr Fedorowicz of the Civic Platform took his place as the Starosta of the Świdnica County. However, in the 2018 Polish local elections, Common Powiat won six seats, this time emerging as the largest party in the Świdnica County. Worsa remains the Vice-Starosta of Świdnica.

== History ==
The party was registered on 29 January 2014 by Zygmunt Worsa, the incumbent Starosta of the Świdnica County. Worsa is known for ambitious and expansive development and investment programs in Świdnica, and was accused by conservative politicians of bringing the county to the brink of bankruptcy. The politician denied these accusations and jokingly proposed cutting the councillors' salaries to further fund his projects.

The members of Common Powiat include politicians already known for their activities within the local governments of Świdnica. Among the members of the new party is Alicja Synowska who has been an active member of the Civic Platform and ran for parliament on behalf of the party, as well as Bolesław Marciniszyn who served as the mayor of Świdnica and entered the district council as a Civic Platform candidate. The party also included former Law and Justice councillors such as Elżbieta Gaszyńska, and many local politicians from the Left Together party.

The committee of Common Powiat announced that while it was ready to form a local coalition with "almost anyone", it specifically preferred to enter a coalition with the Civic Platform and Democratic Left Alliance, signalling a left-leaning alignment of the new party. The local politicians of left-wing Democratic Left Alliance extensively cooperated with Worsa during his term as Starosta.

The party fielded candidates for local councils of the Świdnica County in the 2014 Polish local elections, and won four seats in total. This made the party the second largest one in Świdnica together with the Civic Platform, while the Polish People's Party emerged as the largest party in the county with five seats.

Common Powiat formed a local coalition with the Civic Platform and the Democratic Left Alliance, which resulted in a reshuffling of the local cabinet. Zygmunt Worsa lost his position as Starosta and became Vice-Starosta instead, while Piotr Fedorowicz of Civic Platform became the next Starosta of Świdnica.

The party fielded 54 candidates for the 2018 Polish local elections. Zygmunt Worsa declared that he aspires to acquire seven seats in the Świdnica councils, and to maintain his position as Vice-Starosta of Świdnica. He also expressed his intention to continue his coalition with the Civic Platform and Democratic Left Alliance.

Ultimately, the party won six seats in the 2018 election, and became the largest party in the Świdnica County, despite falling one seat short of its desired goal. Worsa remained the Vice-Starosta of Świdnica.

In April 2019, the party was mistakenly called Active Local Politicians (Polish: Aktywni Samorządowcy) by a Polish political blog called "Karuzela Polityczna".

In March 2024, the party declared that it will be contesting the 2024 Polish local elections, and registered its electoral committee. In its campaign, Common Powiat particularly stressed its plans to invest more in local healthcare and to modernize hospitals, as well as finish the renovations that they were unable to carry out in their 2018–2024, such as renovation of the sport hall. The party also noted the particularly high amount of local electoral committees in the 2024 election, and citing its limited funds, it aimed for a modest goal of trying to maintain any of its six seats that it won in 2018. Ultimately, the party was able to win 4 seats in the election, thus reducing their total amount of seats by two, but remaining an influential local party.

== Ideology ==
Common Powiat is a localist and regionalist party that focuses exclusively on the issues of Świdnica and Lower Silesia. Nationally, the party is critical of the United Right government and cooperates with the Civic Platform and the left-wing Democratic Left Alliance.

The party's program is mainly based on the plans of its founder Zygmunt Worsa, former Starosta and incumbent Vice-Starosta of the Świdnica County. The plan of the party for the 2018 election included implementing numerous new investments, including the retrofitting of the hospital, the modernisation of secondary schools and the expansion of the sports base, as well as the completion of road repairs.

The party is critical of the current way of calculating the budget of local governments, arguing that the current system leaves local councils underfunded and unable to carry out necessary investments that could help bring about further profit. To counteract this, Common Powiat proposed a "repair program" that would result in salary cuts for employees at the starost's office and councillors' allowances.

Common Powiat supports the European Union and believes that funds Poland receives from the union are necessary for local investments and repairs. The party also expressed its support for the so-called "schetynówki", otherwise known as the National Programme for the Reconstruction of Local Roads (Polish: Narodowy Program Przebudowy Dróg Lokalnych), which are multi-year programmes aimed at providing local government units with targeted subsidies from the state budget for the co-financing of their own tasks with regard to the reconstruction, construction or renovation projects.

In its 2024 program, the party stressed its plans to ensure energy security as well as investments in healthcare, such as purchasing new medical equipment, renovation of the local hospital and expanding the range of healthcare servies, in cooperation with neighbouring municipalities. It also presented reformist proposals, such as enhancing transparency of local governments and ensuring that non-governmental organisations operating in their district are supported and are able to organize their initiatives. The party also proposed to increase investment in the local police force.

One of the landmark proposals of the Common Powiat for the 2018 elections is the construction of a district sports hall, which is to be placed next to the secondary school in Świdnica.

== See also ==
- Nonpartisan Local Government Activists
- Civic Initiative
- First Self-Governance League
- Yes! For Poland
