= First Self-Governance League =

First Self-Governance League Liga Samorządowa Pierwsza
- Abbreviation: LSP
- Leader: Ryszard Ziobro
- Founded: 27 February 2018
- Headquarters: Grzebłowiec 34, 43-200 Pszczyna
- Membership (2018): 60
- Ideology: Decentralisation; Silesian localism Silesian regionalism Environmentalism
- Political position: Centre-left to left-wing (Note: The party ran together with the Polish Socialist Party in the Pszczyna County, considered an unprecedented move in Silesian politics.)
- National affiliation: Polish Socialist Party
- Colours: Green
- Slogan: "Independent self-government" (Polish: "Niezależny samorząd")
- Sejm: 0 / 460
- Senate: 0 / 100
- European Parliament: 0 / 51
- Regional assemblies: 0 / 552
- City presidents: 0 / 117

Website
- ligasamorzadowapierwsza.pl

First Self-Governance League (Polish: Liga Samorządowa Pierwsza, LSP) is a minor local Polish party active in the Pszczyna County of Upper Silesia. The party was registered in February 2018, and formally convened on 1 October 2018 in preparation for the 2018 Polish local elections. The party fielded candidates for city and county councils in Pszczyna jointly with the Polish Socialist Party in 2018. The party managed to win five seats for gmina councils in the election - one seat for the Gmina Goczałkowice-Zdrój council, three seats for Gmina Pszczyna, and one seat for the council of Gmina Pawłowice. The leader of the party, Ryszard Ziobro, won 3.48% of the popular vote and did not win a council seat. In the 2024 Polish local elections, the party won three council seats.

The party presented three mottos that are to define its ideology - Pszczyna County - an active and self-governing part of Silesia, Silesia - regional, aware of its national and cultural identity and Poland - regional, not centralised. The main focus of the party is to strengthen the local identity and the independence of the local governments, arguing that because a central government is unfamiliar with the needs of local residents, local authorities should be given more power, and their competences, while territorially limited, should outweight those of the central government. The party also advocates for Silesian regionalism, and wants to cultivate Silesian culture and identity separate of the Polish one.

== History ==
The party first started in 2002 as an unofficial alliance of local self-government representatives of the Pszczyna County, expanding into the councillors of municipal and district councils. The First Self-Governance League was then formally registered as a party on 27 February 2018.

On 1 October 2018, the committee of the First Self-Governance League inaugurated its election campaign. During the meeting, the candidates for city and district councillors were presented, and the election programme was unveiled as well. The party list was organised together with the Polish Socialist Party, and the two parties formed a coalition in the Pszczyna county for the 2018 Polish local elections.

The candidates of the party included the incumbent mayor of Pszczyna Dariusz Skrobol, as well as local socialist councillors: Krystian Szostak (deputy mayor of Pszczyna), Stefan Ryt (member of the Pszczyna County Board) and Zdzisław Grygier. When asked about forming a coalition with the socialist party, the party representatives responded that the goal is to prevent the fragmentation of the local electorate.

During the October convention, the main point of the party was declared to be counteracting the apparent centralisation and top-down controls of local governments by the central Polish government. As members of the party are local councillors, the First Self-Governance League was created to serve as a political front for negotiating with national institutions such as the National Health Fund, which the League politicians wanted to obtain a contract for outpatient clinics and a local hospital with.

The party fielded 60 candidates for the 2018 Polish local elections together with the Polish Socialist Party. Among those, 5 were elected to local councils. One seat was obtained in the council of Gmina Goczałkowice-Zdrój, three seats were won in the local council of Gmina Pszczyna, and one seat was obtained in the Gmina Pawłowice as well. The leader of the party, Ryszard Ziobro, did not win a seat, obtaining 3.48% of the popular vote.

In the 2024 Polish local elections, the party ran as Pszczyna Local Self-Governance League (Polish: Liga Samorządowa Ziemi Pszczyńskiej), where it won 3 council seats in total, down from 5 in 2018. Two seats were for the Pszczyna County Council, while 1 was for the Pszczyna City Council. The leader of the party, Ryszard Ziobro, once again failed to win a seat, winning 2.17% of the popular vote.

== Ideology ==
The slogan of the party is "Independent Local Government", and the main focus of the party is regionalism and localism. The party argued that under the United Right government, "certain sectors of public life have been occupied", and the League believes that this policy can be moved into local governments of Poland and Silesia as well. The party wants to fight the "centralisation inclinations" present in the Polish government and stated that it intends to counter the centralisation and top-down control of local governments.

The League promised to increase funding for road investments, to create and adhere to a long-term plan for road and pavement construction, to build sports facilities at schools, to abolish payments for day-care centres, to build a nursery school in Pszczyna, to allocate more funds for youth sports teams, to prepare investment areas, to spend more on municipal and district transport, and to establish municipalized water companies in local villages. The party also believes that local councils should work longer, and that district offices should be open until 17:00.

Describing the program of the party, one of the members of the First Self-Governance League, Stanisław Mazuczyk, stated: "Independent self-government is the highest form of direct democracy. In the period of socio-political transition after 1989, the reconstruction of local self-government was one of the most important tasks of the political system. Communal self-government was restored in 1990 and district self-government in 1998. It is the inhabitants, through their councillors, who decide and should continue to decide on the directions of development of their small homeland - city and district." Mazurczyk also said that the party is a reaction to "attempts to subordinate local government to the central structures of large political parties and the temptation to make funding for local investments dependent on the ability of local government to cooperate with the team currently in power".

The party outlined its main goals, which is transferring more competences to the municipal and local self-governments, increasing subsidies and subventions to local governments and making local investments be administrated by them rather than state authorities, and to increase local authority in the field of education and health services. The party also wants to reinforce and develop the Silesian identity and culture of Pszczyna, believing that Silesian culture should be cultivated and the local inhabitants should value their Silesian identity over the Polish one. The three main points of the party were listed as:

- Pszczyna County - an active and self-governing part of Silesia;
- Silesia - regional, aware of its national and cultural identity;
- Poland - regional, not centralised.

The party also expressed its commitment to environmentalism, arguing that it is necessary to create a system for raising the environmental awareness of residents and to launch an environmental education starting from primary school. The party also proposed a "Low Emission Reduction Programme", which would include completing the construction of the sanitary sewage system in the Pszczyna municipality and taking the local initiative to set up water companies under municipal control, which would provide water to local villages. In regards to housing, the party believes that the current system of private housing is inefficient and proposed a project of providing municipal and social housing instead.

Describing the social ideology of the party, the convention announced its support for efforts to obtain a contract with the National Health Fund for specialist clinics at the local hospital, as well as for the Nursing and Care Unit. The League also wants to set up a paediatric ward and carry out further renovation work and the purchase of new equipment for Pszczyna hospital. The party wants further control of the local healthcare system, and proposed a system of co-founding it together with the central government. The party also intends to promote and support foster parenthood in the next term and to systematically increase optional benefits, including advocating for a full launch of the District Disability Assessment Team in Pszczyna and the simultaneous removal of architectural barriers for disabled residents.

== See also ==
- Civic Initiative
- Common Powiat
- Silesian Regional Party
- Silesian Autonomy Movement
- Silesians Together
