= Bogdan Wenta =

Polish politician and handball player (born 1961)

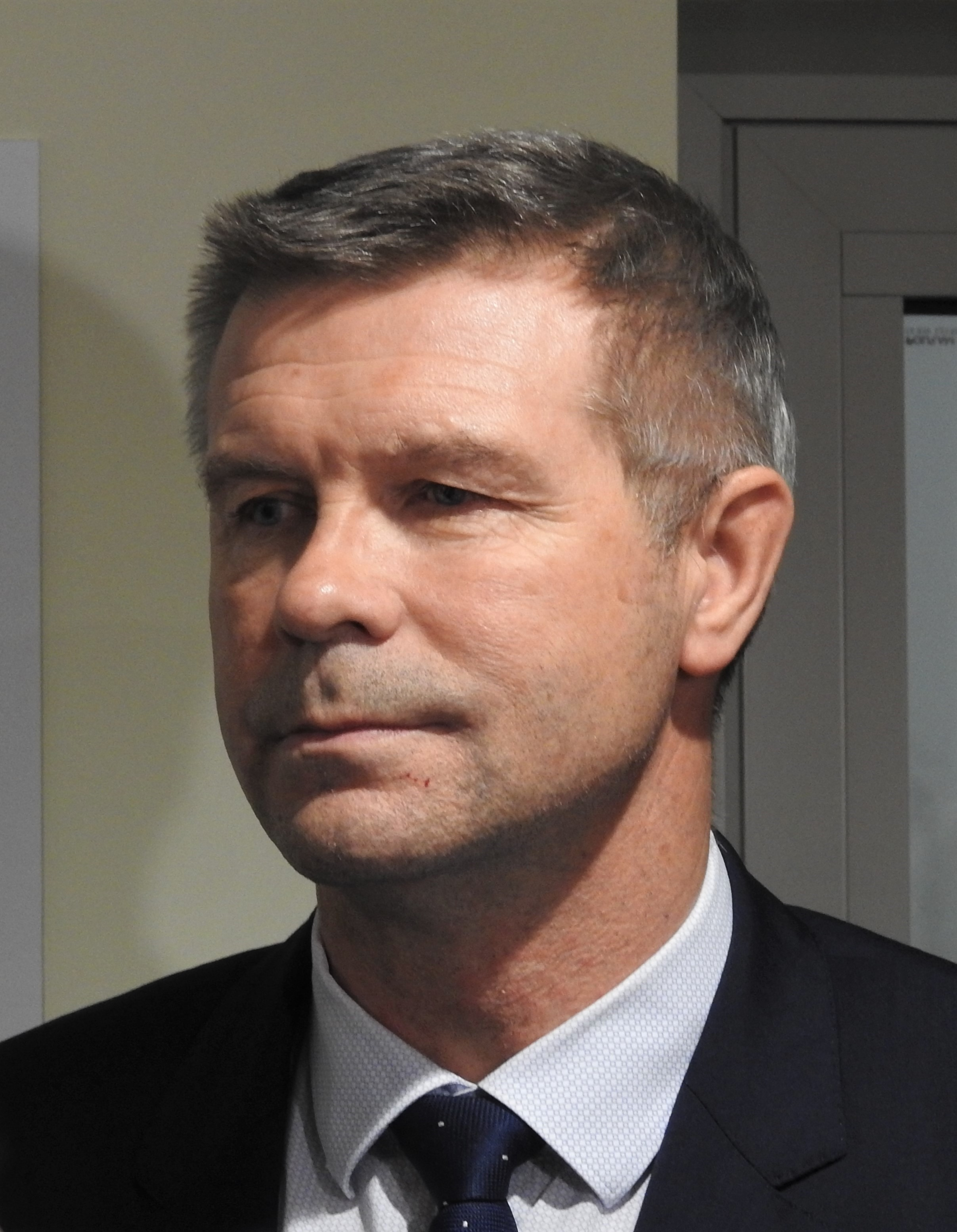
- Wenta in 2019

Mayor of Kielce
- Incumbent
- Assumed office 22 November 2018
- Vice President: Bożena Szczypiór; Marcin Różycki; Arkadiusz Kubiec
- Preceded by: Wojciech Lubawski

Member of the European Parliament
- In office 1 July 2014 – 13 November 2018
- Constituency: Lesser Poland and Świętokrzyskie

Personal details
- Born: Bogdan Brunon Wenta; November 19, 1961 (age 64) Szpęgawsk, Poland
- Party: Świętokrzyskie project (2016–present)
- Height: 1.95 m (6 ft 5 in)
- Children: Tomasz Wenta (b. 1996)
- Handball career
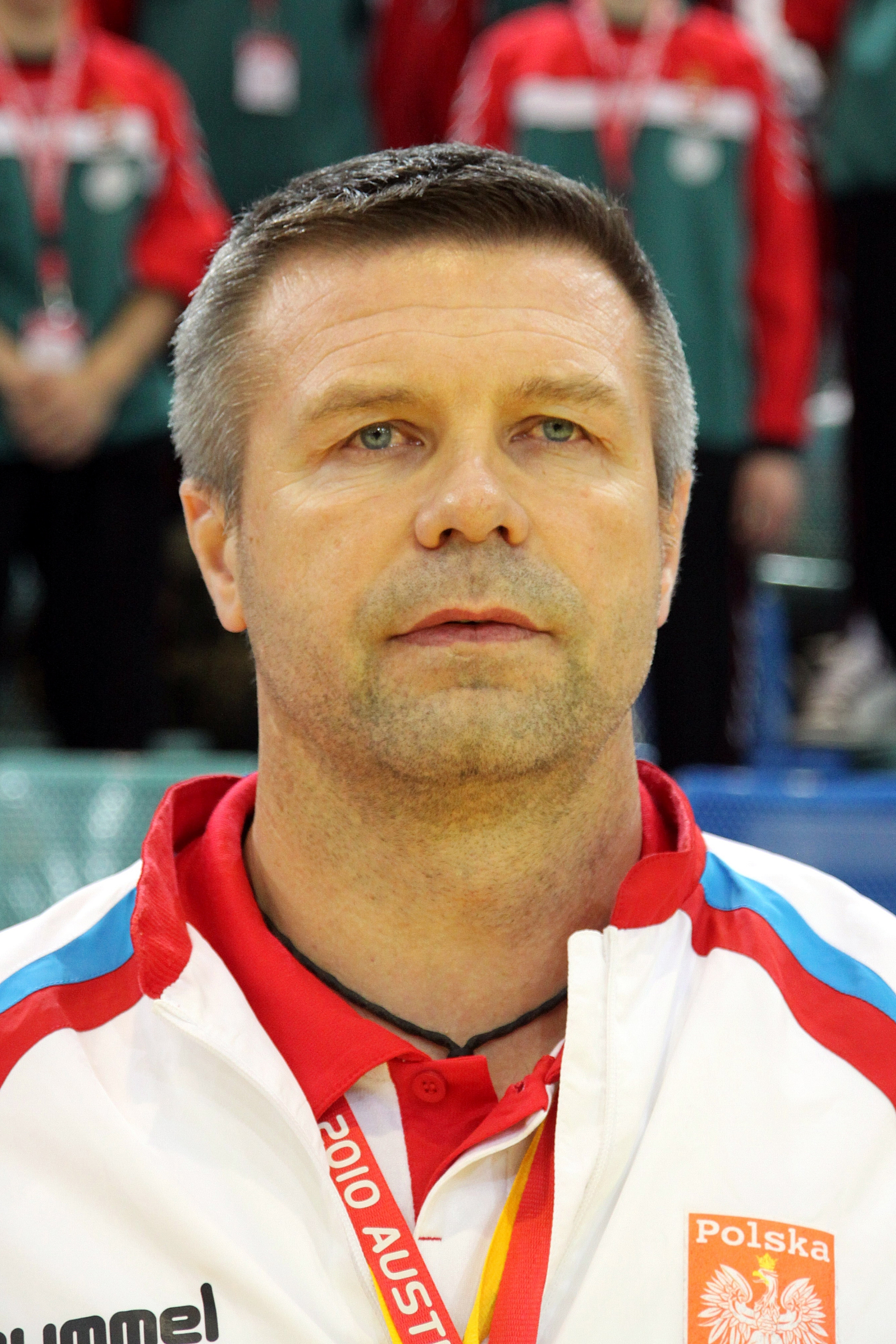
- Nationality: Polish; German
- Sport: Handball
- Position: Central

Senior clubs
- Years: Team
- 1978–1989: Wybrzeże Gdańsk
- 1989–1992: Bidasoa Irún
- 1992–1995: FC Barcelona
- 1995–1998: Nettelstedt-Lübbecke
- 1998–2000: Flensburg-Handewitt
National team
Years	Team	Apps	(Gls)
1981–1994	Poland	198	(763)
1997–2000	Germany	50	(144)

Teams managed
- 2000–2006: Flensburg-Handewitt II
- 2004–2012: Poland
- 2006–2007: SC Magdeburg
- 2008–2014: Vive Kielce
Medal record
Representing Germany
Men's handball
European Championship
Bronze medal – third place	1998 Italy
- Updated on 13 June 2015

Bogdan Brunon Wenta (born 19 November 1961) is a Polish politician and handball coach and former Polish and German handball player. He was a member of the Poland men's national handball team in 1981–1994 and Germany men's national handball team in 1997–2000, a participant of the Olympic Games Sydney 2000, five-time Polish Champion (1984, 1985, 1986, 1987, 1988), and former head coach of Poland. He has been one of the best handball players in the history of Polish handball. Between 2014 and 2018 he was a Member of the European Parliament for the Polish Civic Platform. In 2018, he was elected as Mayor of Kielce, having run from his own committee with the endorsement of the Civic Platform.

== Personal life ==
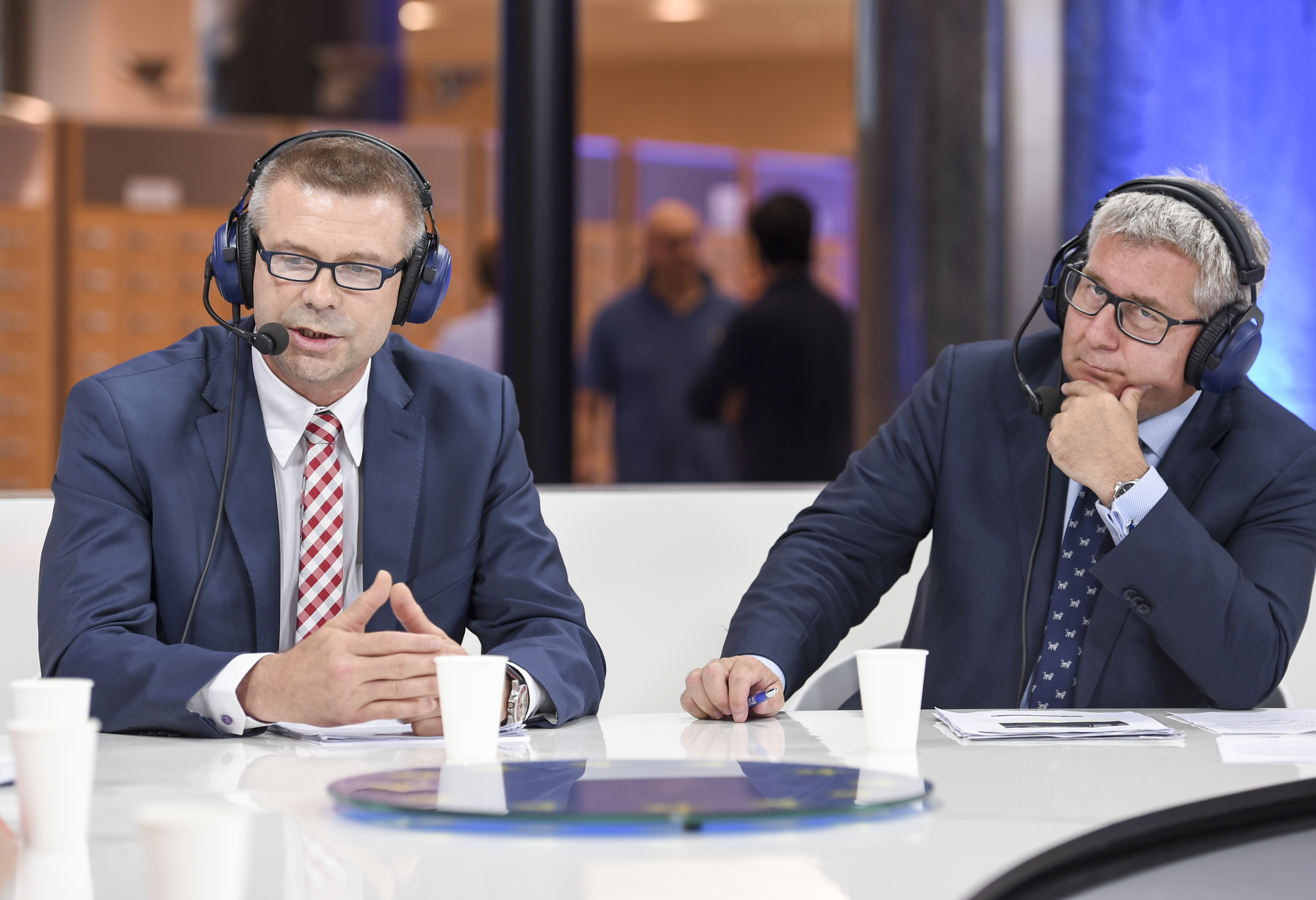
Wenta (left) in his role as MEP

Since 1984 he has been married to Iwona. They have one son Tomasz (born 13 March 1996). In 2014 Bogdan Wenta was elected to European Parliament.

== Career as player ==
=== Clubs ===
Wenta's entire career in Poland was connected with one club, Wybrzeże Gdańsk, where he started playing in first team in 1978, when he was 17. He was five-times Polish Champion (1984–1988) and achieved the European Cup final twice, losing to RK Metaloplastika Šabac in 1986 and SKA Mińsk in 1987. In 1989 he moved to Spain and played for Bidasoa Irún (1989–1992) and FC Barcelona Handbol (1992–1995). He was the first Polish player in FC Barcelona. He subsequently emigrated to Germany, and played for TuS Nettelstedt (1995–1998) and SG Flensburg-Handewitt (1998–2000).

=== National teams ===
==== Poland 1981–1993 ====
Wenta made his debut in the Polish national team in 1981, when he was barely 20. He was appointed by Zygfryd Kuchta and played his first match against Switzerland. He represented Poland in 185 official games (including friendly matches 198) and scored 763 goals, the third-highest total in the history of Polish handball.

He took part in the World Handball Championship twice, in 1986 (14th place) and 1990 (11th place). He did not compete at the Olympic Games as a member of the Polish national team. In 1993 he was criticised for Poland's failure to qualify for the 1994 European Men's Handball Championship, after which he was never selected for the national team again.

==== Germany 1997–2000 ====
In 1996 Wenta obtained German citizenship, which caused some controversy in his homeland, Poland. However, he never played against the Polish national team. He represented Germany in 46 official games (plus four friendlies) and scored 144 goals.

Wenta took part in the World Championship twice, in 1997 and 1999. He won a bronze medal at the 1998 European Championship and also played in the 2000 tournament. He made his Olympic debut at the 2000 Sydney Olympics, where Germany finished fifth.

He regained Polish citizenship in 2008.

== Career as coach, 2000–2012 ==
Bogdan Wenta retired as a player in 2000 and became assistant coach at SG Flensburg-Handewitt. In 2005, due to a spate of injuries within the team, he returned to the court to play at the age of 44, wearing the number corresponding to his age.

From the summer of 2006 to autumn 2007, he served as head coach of the German club SC Magdeburg.

On 28 October 2004, Wenta was appointed head coach of Poland men's national handball team. Under his leadership, Poland achieved one of the greatest successes in its handball history, winning the silver medal at the World Championship after losing 25–29 to hosts Germany in the final. At the 2008 Summer Olympics in Beijing, Poland finished fifth after defeating Russia 29–28. In 2009, Poland won the bronze medal at the 2009 World Men's Handball Championship in Croatia, beating Denmark 31–23 in the third-place match. In January 2010, Wenta was named Coach of the Year 2009 by the Plebiscite of Przegląd Sportowy. The national team failed to qualify for the 2012 Summer Olympics, and on 19 April 2012, Wenta announced his resignation.

- 2007 EHF Cup, with SC Magdeburg
- 2007 IHF World Championship, with Poland
- 2009 IHF World Championship, with Poland
- 2009 Polish Cup, with Vive Targi Kielce
- 2009 Polish Championship, with Vive Targi Kielce
- 2010 Polish Cup, with Vive Targi Kielce
- 2010 Polish Championship, with Vive Targi Kielce
- 2011 Polish Cup, with Vive Targi Kielce
- 2011 Polish Championship, with Vive Targi Kielce
- 2012 Polish Cup, with Vive Targi Kielce
- 2012 Polish Championship, with Vive Targi Kielce
- 2013 Polish Cup, with Vive Targi Kielce
- 2013 Polish Championship, with Vive Targi Kielce
- 2013 EHF Champions League, with Vive Targi Kielce

== Involvement in politics, 2014–present ==
Wenta was a Member of the European Parliament elected in the 2014 European elections. In European Parliament, he served on the Committee on Culture and Education and on the Committee on Development. In addition to his committee assignments, he was a member of the Parliament's delegation to the ACP–EU Joint Parliamentary Assembly. In 2018, he quit his membership in the European Parliament after being elected as Mayor of Kielce in 2018 Polish local elections.

== Other activities ==
- European Endowment for Democracy (EED), Member of the Board of Governors

== Sporting achievements ==
=== Clubs ===
==== National championships ====
- 1981/1982 Polish Championship, with Wybrzeże Gdańsk
- 1982/1983 Polish Championship, with Wybrzeże Gdańsk
- 1983/1984 Polish Championship, with Wybrzeże Gdańsk
- 1984/1985 Polish Championship, with Wybrzeże Gdańsk
- 1985/1986 Polish Championship, with Wybrzeże Gdańsk
- 1986/1987 Polish Championship, with Wybrzeże Gdańsk
- 1987/1988 Polish Championship, with Wybrzeże Gdańsk
- 1990/1991 Spanish Cup, with Bidasoa Irún
- 1992/1993 Spanish Cup, with FC Barcelona
- 1993/1994 Spanish Championship, with FC Barcelona
- 1993/1994 Spanish Cup, with FC Barcelona
- 1994/1995 Spanish SuperCup 1994, with FC Barcelona
- 1998/1999 German SuperCup 1998, with TuS Nettelstedt-Lübbecke

=== National team ===
- 1998 European Championship

=== Individually ===
- 1990 ASOBAL League - The best pair of foreign players with Alfreð Gíslason
- 1991 ASOBAL League - The best pair of foreign players with Alfreð Gíslason
- 1990 ASOBAL League - Most Valuable Player
- 1991 ASOBAL League - Most Valuable Player
- 1995 ASOBAL League - Best Playmaker

=== State awards ===
- 2007 Knight's Cross of Polonia Restituta
