= Civic Initiative (Poland) =

Civic Initiative Inicjatywa Obywatelska
- Abbreviation: IO
- Leader: Adam Morawiec
- Founded: 10 January 2002
- Split from: Civic Platform
- Headquarters: Legionów 37C, 42-600 Tarnowskie Góry
- Membership (2023): 200
- Ideology: Silesian localism Communitarianism; Pro-Europeanism; Environmentalism
- Political position: Centre
- Colours: Blue; Yellow
- Sejm: 0 / 460
- Senate: 0 / 100
- European Parliament: 0 / 51
- Regional assemblies: 0 / 552
- City presidents: 0 / 117

Website
- inicjatywa-obywatelska.eu

Civic Initiative (Polish: Inicjatywa Obywatelska, IO) is a local Polish party from the Tarnowskie Góry County. Civic Initiative was registered on 10 January 2002, and was to be a local reflection of the national Civic Platform party. After its creation in 2002, the party fielded candidates for the local county council and the city council, winning plurality of the seats. Civic Initiative is only present in Tarnowskie Góry and nearby local councils, and represents the interests of local community as well as the local, Silesian culture. The party advocates the recognition of Silesian as an official regional language.

The party is mainly localist and focuses on working and representing the local community, implementing local projects and promoting local culture. Between 2018 and 2024, Civic Initiative was the largest party in the Tarnowskie Góry City Council, as it won 13 seats out of 23. The party is aligned with the Polish opposition and forms a local coalition with the Civic Platform and Nowoczesna. In the 2024 Polish local elections, the party's seats were reduced to 7, and so it was overtaken by the Civic Platform as the largest party in the city council.

== History ==
On 10 January 2002, the party was registered as a political association under the name Civic Initiative of the Tarnogórskie County. The party claimed to be inspired by the national movement Civic Platform and wanted to be a local equivalent of it. However, the most significant difference between the Civic Platform and the Civic Initiative is that the latter did not set political goals, but merely social ones.

In 2002, the Civic Initiative put up its candidates for the County Council and the City Council. It was able to won seats in both councils. After the 2006 elections, the Civic Initiative had five representatives each in the County Council and the City Council - in addition, its candidate, Arkadiusz Czech, was elected Mayor of Tarnowskie Góry.

The Civic Initiative also participated in the 2010 local elections. Arkadiusz Czech was re-elected Mayor of Tarnowskie Góry, and Gabriel Tobor became the Mayor of Radzionków for the next term. The party also won the largest number of seats in both councils, and the councillors of the party also won the election and gained a majority in the Tworóg County Council. The Civic Initiative also won the most seats in the Tarnogórski District Council. The party ruled together with Civic Platform.

In 2018, the party once again won most seats in both council of Tarnowskie Góry, and entered a new coalition with Civic Platform and Nowoczesna, parties belonging to the Civic Coalition. Krystyna Kosmala of the Civic Initiative was elected starosta of the city.

In 2024, the party ran a green, heavily environment-oriented campaign. However, the party lost almost half of its seats - it had 13 seats in the 2018-2024 term, but in the 2024 Polish local elections, it won 7. The Civic Platform became the largest party in the Tarnowskie Góry City Council, as it won 9 seats. Nevertheless, Civic Initiative and the Civic Platform have a majority together, keeping the coalition intact.

== Program ==
The main aim of the Civic Initiative is to "support various types of local initiatives". The party is strictly localist and aims to represent the interests of the local community. The party believes in the ideas of communitarianism and sees development of the local community as a way to solve economic and social problems. In addition to protecting and developing the local culture, Civic Initiative also advocates for increased local budgets in order to foster local development, while also proposing expanded welfare net and social assistance, listing expanded welfare "to the most vulnerable social groups" as one of its priorities.

The party supports the European Union and believes that the Polish membership in it had been beneficial. Moreover, the party promotes European integration. Civic Initiative also supports environmentalists initiatives; it advocates for sustainable development and reduction of air pollution. The party also proposes implementing restrictions on private car ownership and promoting public transport in order to improve road capacity and protect the environment. The party also advocates the recognition of Silesian as an official language of Silesia, and wants to encourage and preserve its use.

In 2014, the party condemned the "Polish Language Act" aimed at preventing the "vulgarisation" of the Polish language and suggested that the Polish government should implement policies that help maintain and cultivate local dialects and regional languages. The party also outlined its three main demands to the Polish government:

- involvement the Polish government in the decommissioning of the chemical waste dump in Silesia;
- assisting local authorities in promoting the construction of the S-11 road;
- recognition of Silesian as a regional language.

In 2024, Civic Initiative ran an environment-oriented campaign, promising to pass laws that would clamp down on air pollution and impose stricter environmental protection laws. It proposed 'green' modernisation of social housing, financial grants for residents willing to install renewable energy sources and replace their heat sources. The party also proposed to revitalise parks, expand rainwater and sanitary sewers, and allocate more land for "green spaces".

== See also ==
- First Self-Governance League
- Common Powiat
- Silesian Autonomy Movement
- Silesian Regional Party
