= The City Is Ours =

Warsaw-based non-profit civic association

The City Is Ours Miasto Jest Nasze
- Abbreviation: MJN
- Chairperson: Eryk Baczyński
- Founded: 30 December 2014
- Headquarters: Gabriela Piotra Boduena 4, 00-011 Warsaw
- Ideology: Socialism; Anti-capitalism; Anti-neoliberalism; Environmentalism
- Political position: Centre-left to left-wing
- National affiliation: The Left (2024 Warsaw local elections)
- Colours: Yellow
- Warsaw City Council: 3 / 60
- Warsaw district councils: 13 / 425

Website
- www.miastojestnasze.org

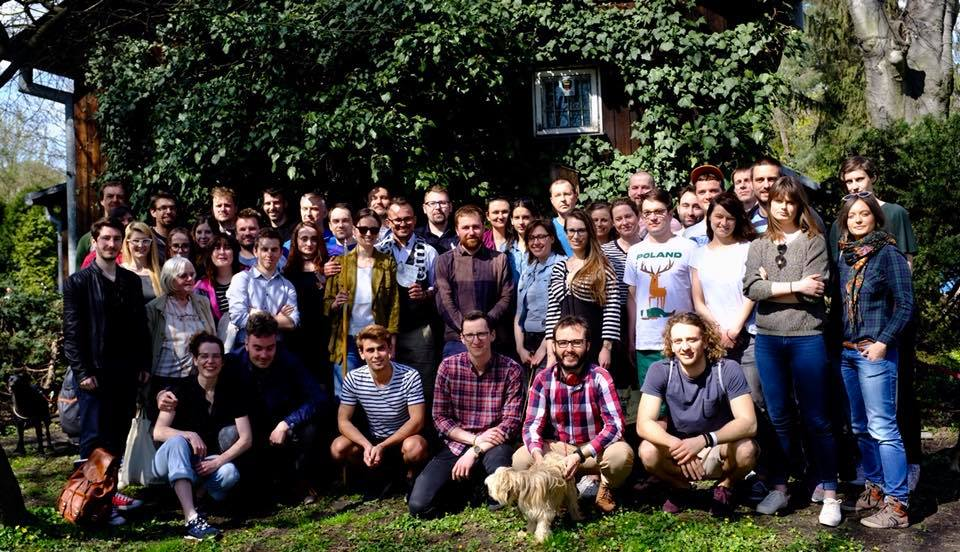
Miasto Jest Nasze members, 2018

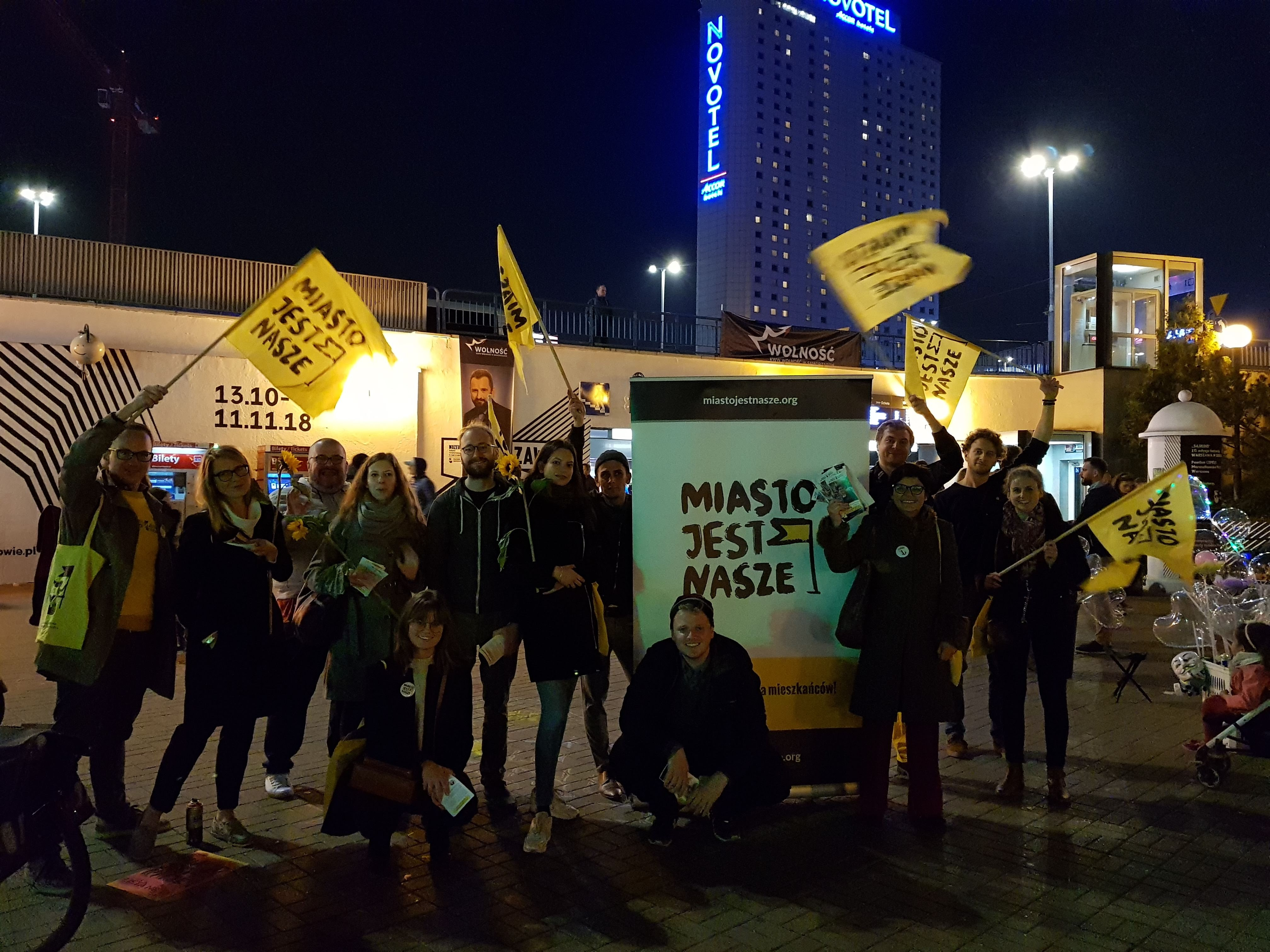
Election campaign

The City Is Ours (Polish: Miasto Jest Nasze, MJN) is an independent citizen platform launched in 2013 in Warsaw, as of 2014 registered as a non-profit civic association. Miasto Jest Nasze is considered to be one of the major urban movements in Poland. In 2018 Polish local elections coalition formed by Miasto Jest Nasze took 22 seats in Warsaw district councils.

== Organization ==
Miasto Jest Nasze counts more than 300 members (June 2024) and is led by board headed by Eryk Baczyński. The association is present in 12 of 18 Warsaw districts.

== Activity ==
Miasto Jest Nasze focuses on exposing and publicizing misconduct of Warsaw authorities. It supports transparency across all city functions as well as civic participation through participatory budgets and public consultations. As part of its activity, it monitors the work of politicians and city officials by publicizing irregularities in Warsaw's management and pressing on the importance of accountability. MJN uses tools typical to bottom-up organization (e.g. throwing up a street dance party) political party (e.g. running in elections) and think tanks (organizing conferences and publishing expert reports presenting alternative solutions).

Among its scope of interests are such issues as: sustainable transport in the city, community rights, environment (especially smog and preserving green areas in the city), land management, reprivatisation of Warsaw properties, participatory democracy.

Miasto Jest Nasze activity has been focusing on identifying and addressing critical issues, inter alia including the following:

- Urban development: promoting the long-term urban policy for a compact and functionally diverse city, the need of applying an active landscape policy for Warsaw and fighting visual advertisement chaos, example being the campaign “Żegnamy Reklamy” (“We say goodbye to advertisements”).
- Sustainable transport: supporting good practices in the further development of public transport and bicycle road infrastructure, promoting pedestrian-friendly space within the framework of the “Pedestrian Critical Mass”.
- Environment: recognizing the need for well-thought-out and environment-friendly solutions in the city, effective green area management and the urgency to fight smog. In 2017 MJN opened a temporary shop with “cigarettes for children”, in fact being a "Smog Information Center"– social campaign which met with a wide interest from nationwide media.
- Reprivatisation of Warsaw properties: Miasto Jest Nasze criticized the process of real estate reprivatisation in Warsaw taking place in the capital intensely in the 1990s and 2000s (i.e. the handing back of properties to pre-communist owners due to change of political system). Broad publicity received maps revealing connections between politicians, including the mayor of Warsaw, lawyers, business people, and real estate companies. Miasto Jest Nasze was sued by some of individuals showed on the maps but won all cases.

Over the past years the activity of Miasto Jest Nasze has also been commented on in various foreign non-English press articles (including Frankfurter Rundschau, Mitteldeutscher Rundfunk, Le Monde, as well as Czech or Slovak media).

== Warsaw municipal elections ==
=== 2014 ===
In 2014 local elections MJN won 7 seats in three Warsaw district councils (4 seats in Śródmieście, 2 in Praga-Północ, and 1 in Żoliborz).

=== 2018 ===
2018 local elections the coalition of local urban movements led by MJN received 5,72% of votes, winning 22 seats in 7 district councils (Mokotów, Ochota, Rembertów, Wawer, Wesoła, Wola, Żoliborz). Justyna Glusman, MJN candidate for mayor of Warsaw, received 2,32% of votes. After the election she became member of the Warsaw mayor board as the Warsaw City Hall coordinator responsible for sustainable development, green area management and fighting smog.

In the local elections of 2018, Miasto Jest Nasza launched an informative campaign to encourage EU citizens living in Warsaw to register and vote in the elections. The site allowed to generate a fast and user-friendly registration application, an innovative solution aiming at promoting the participation of the wide group of foreigners living in the capital.

=== 2024 ===
Upon the 2024 local elections MJN signed an electoral agreement with the Left Together on 29 January 2024, and run from The Left electoral lists. They gained three seats in the Warsaw City Council and twelve seats in Warsaw district councils.

== International cooperation ==
Miasto jest Nasze is a member of the federation "Urban Movement Congress", which groups 40 organizations from around 20 Polish cities.

In June 2017 Miasto Jest Nasze members participated in the Fearless Cities Summit in Barcelona, organized by Barcelona en Comú within the global municipalist movement “Fearless Cities network”. In July 2018, Miasto Jest Nasze hosted the Fearless Cities CEE International Municipalist Summit in Warsaw. The first such conference to be held, it was a platform to exchange experiences on urban activism in the region, regrouping more than a hundred participants from Central and Eastern European municipalist movement organizations (including Spasi Sofia from Sofia, Ne Davimo Beograd from Belgrade, Praha sobě from Prague and Iare Pekhit from Tbilisi).

== Ideology ==
The main goal of the association is to protest undemocratic and profit-driven forms of urban planning, such as reprivatization and gentrification projects. The party organized blockades to prevent evictions as well as destruction of districts that house low-income tenants or which are important for local culture. The association argues that city authorities in Poland have developed a "mechanism of destroying the everything in order to make money". Miasto Jest Nasze is strongly critical of neoliberal policies, which it sees as the cause of growing wealth inequality; it is also strongly critical of the Civic Platform party, arguing that despite being the main rival to populist Law and Justice, it fails to provide a real alternative given its support for privatization and neoliberal policies.

The association also promotes green politics and sustainable economics, including environmentalist urban planning methods. It advocate the development of green cities and serves as a watchdog for environmental causes, campaigning on the need to curb air pollution and smog in Warsaw. It is particularly well-known for publishing the "Map of Reprivatisation", which exposes connection between politician and real estate companies involved in corruption and reprivatization programs. It also launched Warsaw Smog Alert and published the "Warsaw Map of Dirty Stoves", providing data about buildings that use low-quality coal stoves and their contribution to air pollution.

The association is positioned left of the political centre and advocates for egalitarianism and participatory democracy in urban planning. It aims to represents 'communities marginalised the in the mainstream (neo)liberal discourse' and is considered a tenant committee as well as a radical democracy association. It seeks to alleviate wealth inequality in the cities and urban decision-making, contents the capitalist-based power hierarchies in the cities, and challenge the "impenetrable ruling political class". Miasto Jest Nasze is strongly critical of capitalism as well as neoliberalism. It advocates a socialist economic system, and is known for slogans such as "housing for millions, not for millionaires" and "strike, strike against capitalism, our way is socialism".

== Election results ==
=== Warsaw mayoral election ===
Election	Candidate	1st round		2nd round		Result
Election	Candidate	Votes	%	Votes	%	Result
2018	Justyna Glusman	20,643	2.32 (#5)	—N/a		Lost
2024	Supported Magdalena Biejat	99,442	12.86 (#3)	—N/a		Lost

=== Warsaw City Council ===
Election	Votes	%	Seats	−/+
2018	50,002	5.72 (#4)	0 / 60	New
2024	102,009	13.30 (#3)	3 / 60	▲3
2024	As part of The Left which won 8 seats in total.			

=== Warsaw district councils ===
Election	Seats	−/+
2014	7 / 423	New
2018	4 / 425	▼3
2018	As part of the urban movements coalition which won 22 seats in total.	
2024	12 / 420	▲8
2024	As part of The Left which won 29 seats in total.	
