= Justyna Glusman =

Polish economist (born 1974)

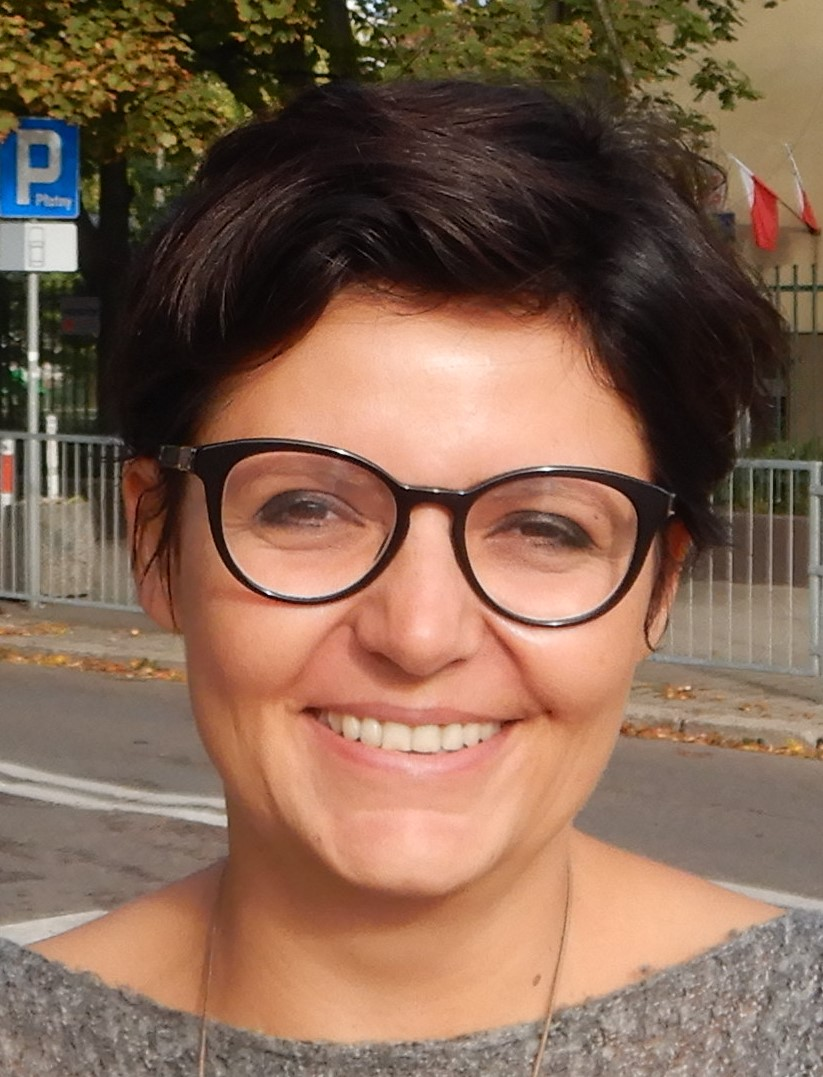
- Born: Justyna Andrzejewicz; 19 September 1974 (age 51); Warsaw, Poland
- Education: Warsaw School of Economics; London School of Economics
- Occupations: economist, lecturer, expert

Justyna Glusman (née Andrzejewicz; born 19 September 1974) is a Polish economist.

== Biography ==
Glusman was born in Warsaw, and graduated from the Warsaw School of Economics (M.A., 1998) and the London School of Economics and Political Science (M.S., 1999) where she also completed her Ph.D. with a thesis titled When is EU conditionality effective? The terms of Poland's accession (2009).

She has been working for the local government, public administration, as well as for the private banking sector. In 2012, she took part in the Presidential Experts’ Program dedicated for young scientists in the Chancellery of the President of the Republic of Poland. She teaches city management and urban policy at the Warsaw School of Economics post-graduate studies.

Since 2008 Justyna Glusman has been a member of the local organization Ochocianie. In 2018 local elections she was running as the Miasto Jest Nasze candidate for mayor of Warsaw. She received 20,643 votes (2,32%). Afterwards she was appointed to the city council.

Her husband was born in Argentina, they live in Ochota district with their three daughters.

== Works ==
- 2017: Raport o sektorze rządowym „Administracja 3.0” (J. Glusman, R. Antczak et al.), Warsaw: Forum Od-nowa
- 2017: City debugged. How to reform the Polish cities, so they thrive socially and facilitate sustainable growth?, Cham: Springer, ISBN 978-3-319-49898-0
- 2016: Tunel drogowy dla ulicy Wawelskiej w Warszawie, Warsaw: Magazyn Autostrady, ISBN 978-83-89410-72-6
- 2015: Transparentność i media lokalne, Kraków: Małopolska Szkoła Administracji Publicznej
- 2014: Jaki przemysł w Europie?, Rzeczpospolita
- 2013: Raport Samorząd 3.0 (praca zbiorowa), Warsaw: Forum Od-nowa
- 2013: Polska polityka regionalna po przystąpieniu do Unii Europejskiej, Warsaw: KPRP, ISBN 978-83-935994-6-2
- 2010: The Impact of Policy Implementation in Poland: Centralisation, Decentralisation and Recentralisation, ISBN 978-1-84885-1238
- 2005: When is EU conditionality towards the candidate countries most effective? [in:] Strategy of Polish Membership in the European Union, Warsaw: UKIE
