= Piotr Misztal =

Polish politician

member of Sejm 2005-2007
- In office 25 September 2005 – 2007

Personal details
- Born: 19 October 1965 (age 60)
- Party: Independent

Piotr Wiktor Misztal (born 19 October 1965 in Łódź) is a Polish politician. He was elected to the Sejm on 25 September 2005, getting 8890 votes in 9 Łódź district as a candidate from the Samoobrona Rzeczpospolitej Polskiej list.

== See also ==
- List of Sejm members (2005–2009)
