= Jacek Wojciechowicz =

Polish politician

Mayor of Racibórz
- Incumbent
- Assumed office 7 May 2024

Member of the Sejm
- In office 25 September 2005 – 2006

Deputy Mayor of Warsaw
- In office 2006–2016

Personal details
- Born: 26 June 1963 (age 62) Racibórz, Poland
- Party: Civic Platform

Jacek Piotr Wojciechowicz (born 26 June 1963) is a Polish politician who has been serving as city mayor of Racibórz since 2024. He was elected to the Sejm on 25 September 2005, getting 3380 votes in 19 Warsaw district as a candidate from the Civic Platform list. He served as Deputy President of Warsaw (2006-2016), and was previously a member of both the 4th Sejm and 5th Sejm.

As part of the 2024 local elections in Poland, he registered his candidacy for Mayor of Racibórz, representing the KWW RAZEM DLA RACIBORZA electoral committee. His campaign resulted in success, receiving 43,96% of the vote in the 1st round of elections and 51,59% in the 2nd round.

== See also ==
- Members of Polish Sejm 2005-2007
