= Świętokrzyskie Voivodeship Sejmik =

Sejmik Województwa Świętokrzyskiego

Type
- Type: Unicameral
- Houses: Regional Assembly (sejmik wojewódzki)

Leadership
- Chairperson: Andrzej Bętkowski, PiS
- Vice-Chairpersons: Magdalena Zieleń, Marek Strzała , Mieczysław Gębski
- Marshal: Renata Janik, OdNowa RP

Structure
- Seats: 30 councillors
- Political groups: Executive board (16): PiS (16); PiS (12); OdNowaRP (2); SP (1); Independent (1); Opposition parties (14): KO (6); PO (5); Independent (1); PSL (6); KiBS (1); Independent (1); P2050 (1)

Elections
- Last election: 7 April 2024

Meeting place
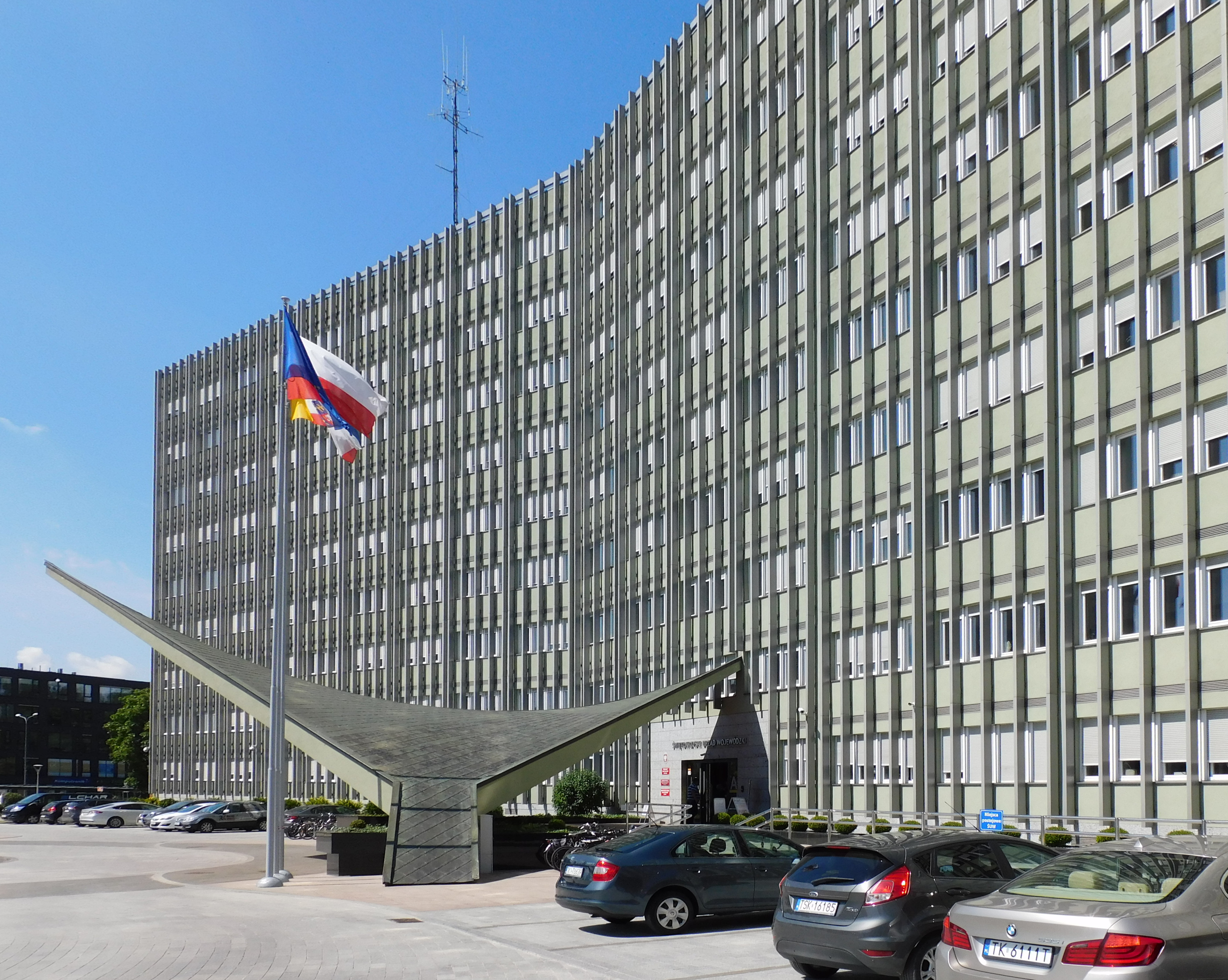
- Voivodeship's Offices, Kielce

Website
- Świętokrzyskie Regional Assembly

The Świętokrzyskie Voivodeship Sejmik (Polish: Sejmik Województwa Świętokrzyskiego) is the regional legislature of the voivodeship of Świętokrzyskie, Poland. It is a unicameral body consists of thirty councillors elected in free elections for a five-year term. The current chairperson of the assembly is Andrzej Bętkowski of the PiS.

The assembly elects the executive board that acts as the collective executive for the regional government, headed by the province's marshal. The current Executive Board of Świętokrzyskie is held by the Law and Justice with Renata Janik presiding as marshal.

The Regional Assembly meets in the Marshal's Office in Kielce.

== Districts ==
Members of the Assembly are elected from five districts, serve five-year terms. Districts does not have the constituencies formal names. Instead, each constituency has a number and territorial description.

Number	Seats	City counties	Land counties
1	6	None	Opatów, Ostrowiec, Sandomierz
2	6	None	Końskie, Skarżysko, Starachowice
3	6	None	Kielce, Staszów
4	5	Kielce	None
5	7	None	Busko, Jędrzejów, Kazimierza, Pińczów, Włoszczowa

== See also ==
- Polish Regional Assembly
- Świętokrzyskie Voivodeship
