= Poland Plus =

Poland Plus Polska Plus
- Leader: Jerzy Polaczek
- Founded: 9 January 2010
- Dissolved: 24 September 2010
- Split from: Law and Justice
- Merged into: Poland Comes First
- Ideology: Conservatism; Liberal conservatism
- Political position: Centre-right
- Colours: Blue, red, white

Website
- http://www.polska-plus.pl/

Poland Plus (Polish: Polska Plus) was a centre-right political party in Poland that existed briefly during 2010. It was formed on 9 January 2010 from deputies in the Sejm that crossed the floor from the Law and Justice party.

The party was dissolved on 24 September 2010, with five of its parliamentary representatives, including leader Jerzy Polaczek, returning to Law and Justice, while Jan Filip Libicki and Jacek Tomczak sat as independents. In November 2010, four of the former Poland Plus members – Libicki, Tomczak, Lucjan Karasiewicz, and Andrzej Walkowiak – joined Poland Comes First.

== Members of Sejm ==
Poland Plus had seven representatives:

- Lucjan Karasiewicz
- Jan Filip Libicki
- Jerzy Polaczek (leader)
- Jarosław Sellin
- Jacek Tomczak
- Kazimierz Michał Ujazdowski
- Andrzej Walkowiak
