= Topolnica =

Topolnica or Topolnicka may refer to:

== Places ==
- Topolnica, Poland
- Topolnica, Majdanpek in Serbia
- Topolnica, Radoviš in North Macedonia
- Topoľnica in Slovakia
- Promachonas-Topolnica, a Late Neolithic settlement near Promachonas, Greece

== People ==
- Adrianna Topolnicka (born 1999), Polish middle-distance runner
- Joanna Topolnicka (1840-1895), one of the nicknames of Katarzyna Onyszkiewiczowa

== See also ==
- Topolnitsa (disambiguation)
- Topola (disambiguation)
- Topoľníky
