= Kazimierz Hajda =

Polish politician (born 1946)

Member of the Sejm
- Incumbent
- Assumed office 10 June 2009
- Constituency: 12 – Chrzanów

Personal details
- Born: 31 January 1946 (age 80) Jordanów, Poland
- Party: Poland Comes First
- Other political affiliations: Law and Justice (2007–10)
- Education: Tadeusz Kościuszko Kraków University of Technology
- Profession: Lecturer

Kazimierz Hajda (born 31 January 1946) is a Polish politician. A member of Poland Comes First (PJN), Hajda sits in the Sejm for Chrzanów, having replaced Paweł Kowal in 2009. He was mayor of Jordanów from 2006 to 2009.

== Life ==
Hajda was born on 31 January 1946 in Jordanów. He graduated from the Faculty of Mechanical Engineering at the Tadeusz Kościuszko Kraków University of Technology. He worked as a designer at the Dezamet metal works in Nowa Dęba. He was then employed as a lecturer and senior research assistant at the Department of Mechanics and Strength of Materials of the Warsaw University of Technology. He led the lessons of mathematics in a high school in Jordanów. He was on his own business.

From 1998 to 2002, he was deputy of Jordanów. In 2006, he won election to the office of mayor of this city, a position he held until 2009. He was president of football club LKS Jordan. Hajda ran for Sejm in the 2007 election, seeking election in Chrzanów for Law and Justice. He obtained 5,245 votes, failing to be elected.

However, he did enter the Sejm after Paweł Kowal was elected to the European Parliament at the 2009 European election, which allowed Hajda to take his place on 10 June 2009. He is a member of the Infrastructure Committee. In November 2010, Hajda left Law and Justice and joined the newly formed and more moderate Poland Comes First.
