= Libicki =

Libicki may refer to:

== People ==
- Jan Filip Libicki (born 1971), a Polish politician.
- Marcin Libicki (born 1939), a Polish politician.
- Martin C. Libicki, an American professor at the Frederick S. Pardee RAND Graduate School.
- Miriam Libicki, American-Israeli graphic novelist
