= Przyłubie =

Przyłubie may refer to the following places:

- Przyłubie, Greater Poland Voivodeship (west-central Poland)
- Przyłubie, Kuyavian-Pomeranian Voivodeship (north-central Poland)
- Przyłubie, Masovian Voivodeship (east-central Poland)
