= Elżbieta Jakubiak =

Polish politician (born 1966)

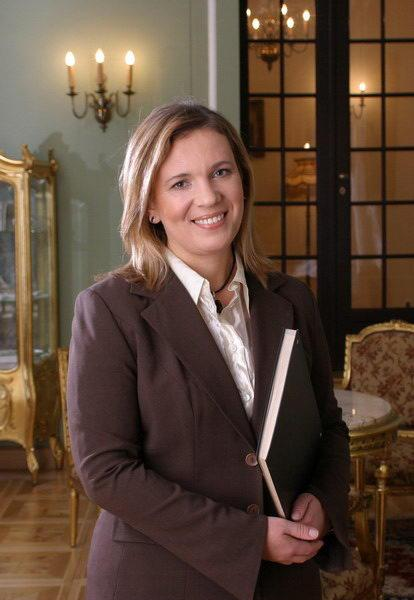

Member of the Sejm
- In office 21 October 2007 – 9 October 2011
- Constituency: 18 – Siedlce

Personal details
- Born: 17 March 1966 (age 60) Zatory
- Party: Poland Comes First
- Other political affiliations: Law and Justice (2007–10)
- Children: 3

Elżbieta Renata Jakubiak (born 17 March 1966) is a Polish politician, sports and tourism minister in the government of Jarosław Kaczyński, was head of the Polish President's Cabinet with the rank of secretary of state, and deputy to the Sejm sixth term of office.

== Biography ==
Jakubiak was born in 1966 in Zatory, Poland, the daughter of Bronislaw Dabrowski and Krystyna. She graduated from the School of Special Education in Warsaw in 1991.

In 1990-1992, she worked in educational and Social Society in Warsaw, then to 1998 in the Chancellery of the Sejm, where she was the Vice-Marshals secretary Jack Kurczewski, Olga Krzyżanowska and John King. In 1998-2002 she served as Director of the Office of the Director-General of the Office for War Veterans and Repressed Persons. Since 2002, she has worked as director of the Office of the President of Warsaw.

Between 23 December 2005 to 23 July 2007 she occupied the position of secretary of state and head of the Polish President's Cabinet. In the period from 23 July 2007 to 16 November 2007 she was the minister of sport and tourism in the government of Jarosław Kaczyński.

In the parliamentary elections in 2007, Jakubiak was elected to the Sejm VI mandate from the list of Law and Justice in Siedlce district. She received 33,509 votes, which was the best individual result in this constituency. Later, she unsuccessfully stood for the PiS and the European Parliament elections in 2009 in Warsaw.

She was suspended in the rights of a member by the President of the Law and Justice party Jaroslaw Kaczynski on 8 September 2010. The decision of the Political Law and Justice party has been to exclude her from the party along with Joanna Kluzik-Rostkowska as "a detriment to the party". On 16 November 2010, MPs Joanna Kluzik-Rostkowska, Jakubiak and Paweł Poncyljusz, and MEPs Adam Bielan and Michał Kamiński formed a new political group, Poland Comes First (Polska jest Najważniejsza).

== Personal life ==
Jakubiak is married and has three children: twins, Joan and Thomas and daughter, Susanna.

== Honours ==
Portuguese Grand Cross of the Order of Merit: 2008
