= Tomasz Dudziński =

Polish politician (born 1973)

Tomasz Mirosław Dudziński
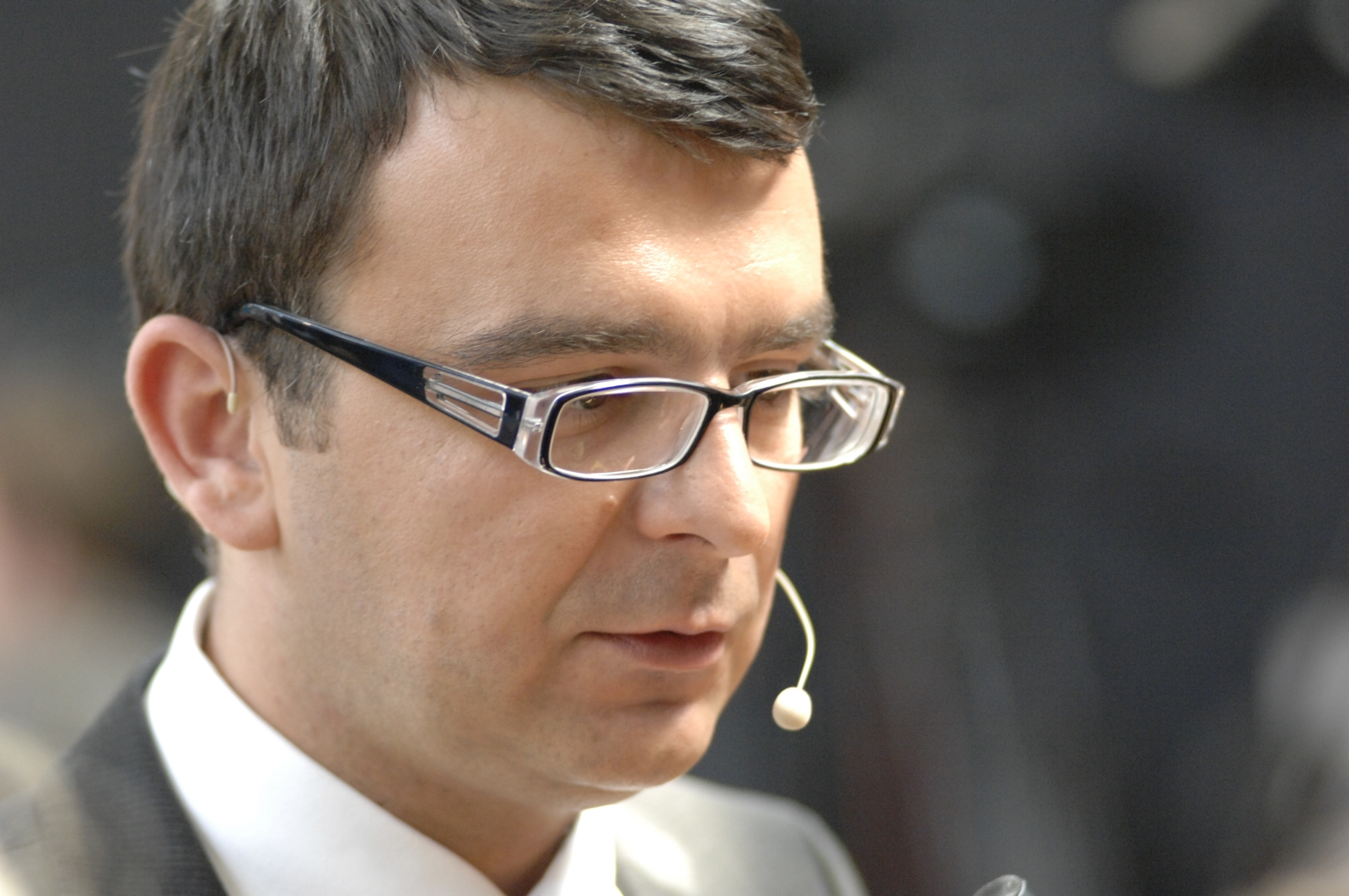
- Tomasz Dudziński

Member of the Sejm
- Incumbent
- Assumed office 25 September 2005
- Constituency: 7 – Chełm

Personal details
- Born: 1 February 1973 (age 53) Parczew
- Party: Poland Comes First
- Other political affiliations: Law and Justice (2005–10)

Tomasz Mirosław Dudziński (born 1 February 1973), is a Polish politician.

Dudziński was born in Parczew. He was elected to the Sejm on 25 September 2005, getting 14,892 votes in Chełm as a candidate from the Law and Justice list. He joined Poland Comes First when that party split from Law and Justice in 2010.

== See also ==
- Members of Polish Sejm 2005–2007
