= Borsuki-Kolonia =

- Village
- Location within Poland
- Coordinates: 52°38′31″N 21°7′38″E
- Country: Poland
- Voivodeship: Masovian
- County: Pułtusk
- Gmina: Zatory
- Population (2021): 85

Borsuki-Kolonia [bɔrˈsuki kɔˈlɔɲa] is a village in the administrative district of Gmina Zatory, within Pułtusk County, Masovian Voivodeship, in east-central Poland.
