= Gmina Zatory =

Gmina Zatory Zatory Commune
- Gmina
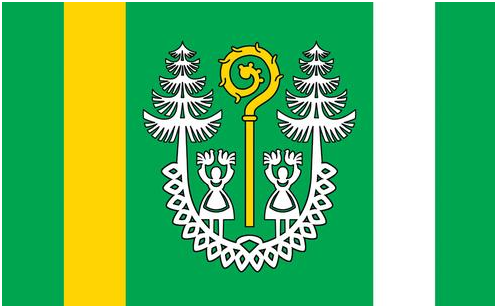
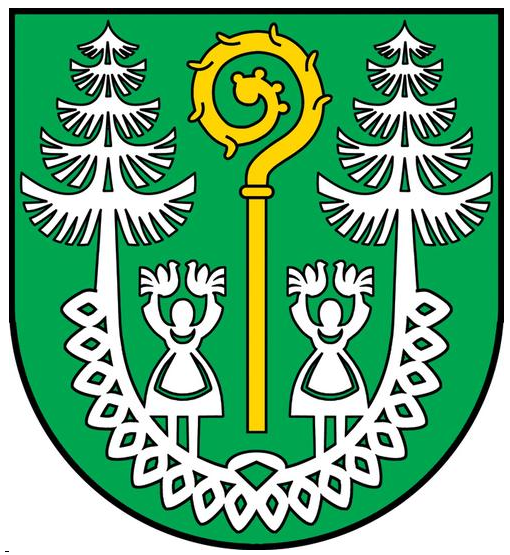
- Flag Coat of arms

- Location within Poland
- Coordinates (Zatory): 52°36′N 21°11′E
- Country: Poland
- Voivodeship: Masovian
- County: Pułtusk
- Seat: Zatory

Area
  - Total: 121.62 km^{2} (46.96 sq mi)

Population (2011)
  - Total: 4,824
  - Density: 39.66/km^{2} (102.7/sq mi)

Gmina Zatory is a rural gmina (administrative district) in Pułtusk County, Masovian Voivodeship, in east-central Poland. Its seat is the village of Zatory, which lies approximately 13 kilometres (8 mi) south-east of Pułtusk and 45 km (28 mi) north of Warsaw.

The gmina covers an area of 121.62 square kilometres (47.0 sq mi), and as of 2006 its total population is 4,750 (4,824 in 2011).

== Villages ==
Gmina Zatory contains the villages and settlements of Borsuki-Kolonia, Burlaki, Cieńsza, Ciski, Dębiny, Drwały, Gładczyn, Gładczyn Rządowy, Gładczyn Szlachecki, Kępa Zatorska, Kruczy Borek, Łęcino, Lemany, Lutobrok, Lutobrok-Folwark, Malwinowo, Mierzęcin, Mystkowiec-Kalinówka, Mystkowiec-Szczucin, Nowe Borsuki, Pniewo, Pniewo-Kolonia, Przyłubie, Śliski, Stawinoga, Topolnica, Wiktoryn, Wólka Zatorska and Zatory.

== Neighbouring gminas ==
Gmina Zatory is bordered by the gminas of Obryte, Pokrzywnica, Pułtusk, Rząśnik, Serock and Somianka.
