= Lutobrok =

- Village
- Location within Poland
- Coordinates: 52°40′N 21°16′E
- Country: Poland
- Voivodeship: Masovian
- County: Pułtusk
- Gmina: Zatory
- Population (2021): 171

Lutobrok [luˈtɔbrɔk] is a village in the administrative district of Gmina Zatory, within Pułtusk County, Masovian Voivodeship, in east-central Poland.
