= Kępa Zatorska =

- Village
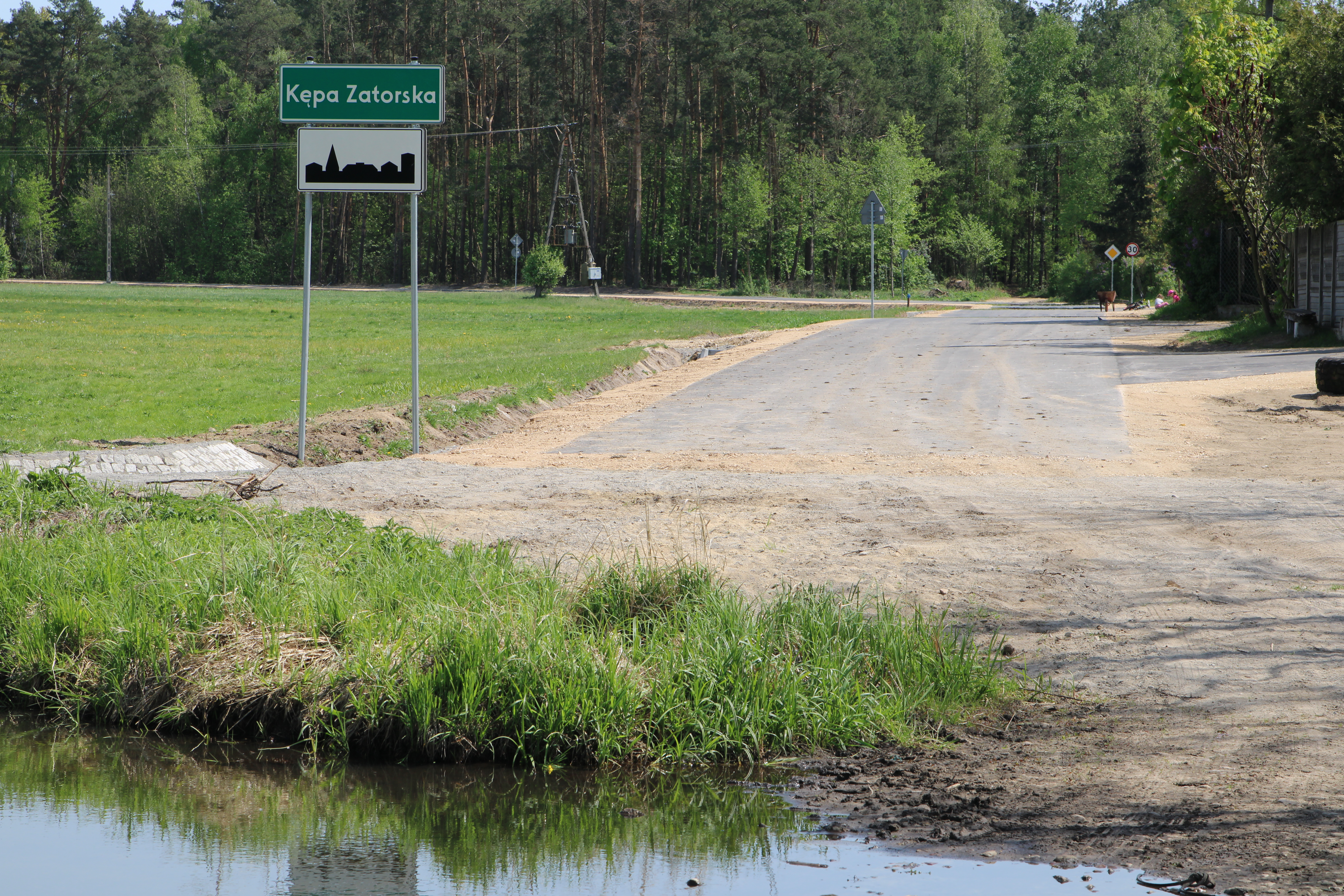

- Location within Poland
- Coordinates: 52°37′N 21°11′E
- Country: Poland
- Voivodeship: Masovian
- County: Pułtusk
- Gmina: Zatory

Kępa Zatorska [ˈkɛmpa zaˈtɔrska] is a village in the administrative district of Gmina Zatory, within Pułtusk County, Masovian Voivodeship, in east-central Poland.
