= Wólka Zatorska =

- Village
- Location within Poland
- Coordinates: 52°35′N 21°12′E
- Country: Poland
- Voivodeship: Masovian
- County: Pułtusk
- Gmina: Zatory

Wólka Zatorska [ˈvulka zaˈtɔrska] is a village in the administrative district of Gmina Zatory, within Pułtusk County, Masovian Voivodeship, in east-central Poland.
