= Pniewo, Pułtusk County =

Pniewo
- Village
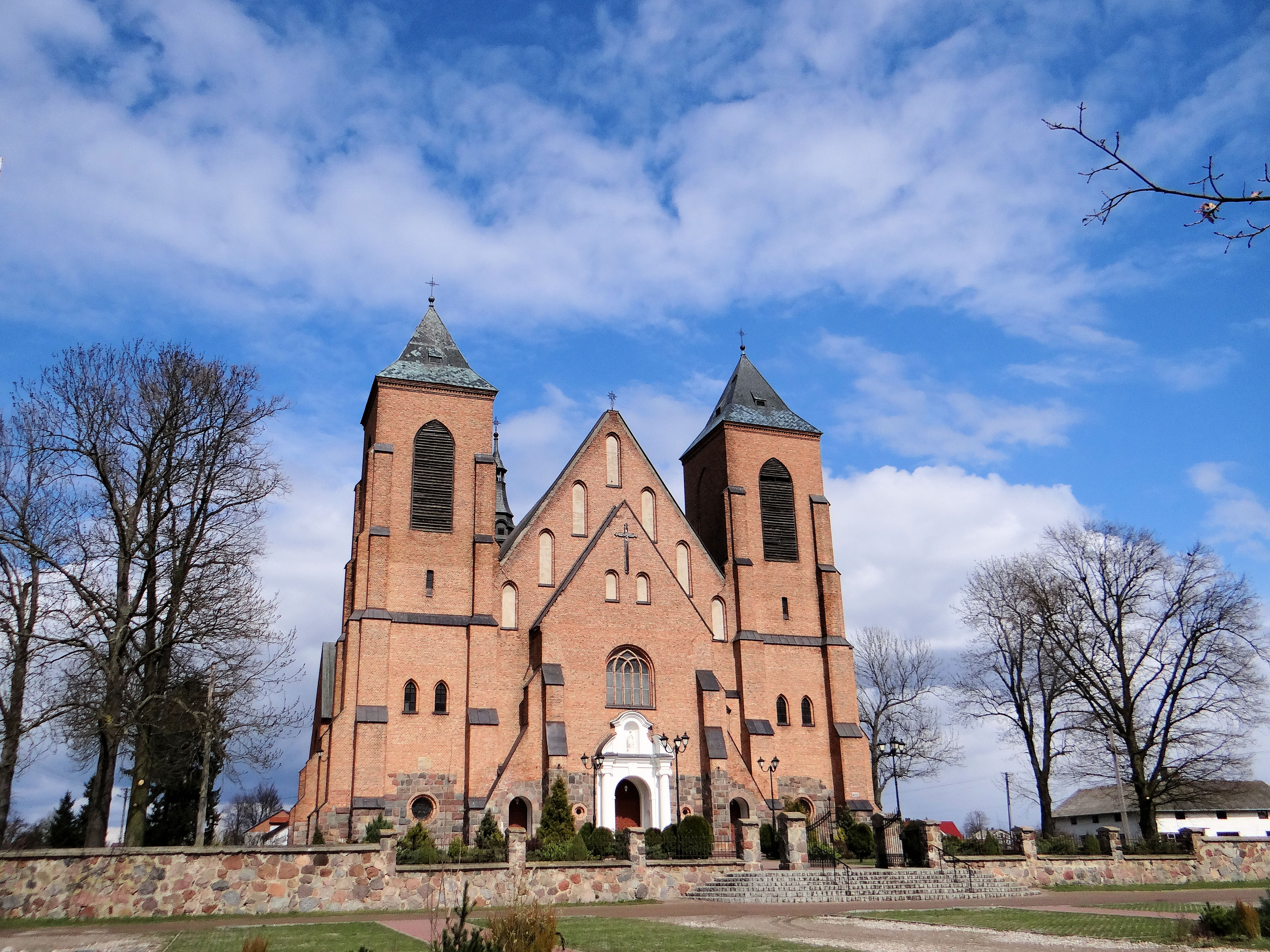
- Saints Peter and Paul Church in Pniewo

- Location within Poland
- Coordinates: 52°39′N 21°16′E
- Country: Poland
- Voivodeship: Masovian
- County: Pułtusk
- Gmina: Zatory
- Time zone: UTC+1 (CET)
  - Summer (DST): UTC+2 (CEST)
- Vehicle registration: WPU

Pniewo [ˈpɲɛvɔ] is a village in the administrative district of Gmina Zatory, within Pułtusk County, Masovian Voivodeship, in east-central Poland.

== History ==
Pniewo was a private church village within the Kingdom of Poland, administratively located in the Masovian Voivodeship in the Greater Poland Province.

According to the 1921 census, the village had a population of 582, 96.9% Polish and 3.1% Jewish.

During the German invasion of Poland, which started World War II, on September 9, 1939, Wehrmacht troops murdered a dozen or so Poles from the nearby town of Wyszków near the village (see also Nazi crimes against the Polish nation).
