= Malwinowo =

- Vil
- Location within Poland
- Coordinates: 52°38′53″N 21°11′07″E
- Country: Poland
- Voivodeship: Masovian
- County: Pułtusk
- Gmina: Zatory

Malwinowo [malviˈnɔvɔ] is a village in the administrative district of Gmina Zatory, within Pułtusk County, Masovian Voivodeship, in east-central Poland.
