= Pniewo-Kolonia =

- Village
- Location within Poland
- Coordinates: 52°39′36″N 21°15′10″E
- Country: Poland
- Voivodeship: Masovian
- County: Pułtusk
- Gmina: Zatory
- Population (2021): 136

Pniewo-Kolonia [ˈpɲɛvɔ kɔˈlɔɲa] is a village in the administrative district of Gmina Zatory, within Pułtusk County, Masovian Voivodeship, in east-central Poland.
