= Lutobrok-Folwark =

- Village
- Location within Poland
- Coordinates: 52°39′48″N 21°15′26″E
- Country: Poland
- Voivodeship: Masovian
- County: Pułtusk
- Gmina: Zatory
- Population (2021): 123

Lutobrok-Folwark [luˈtɔbrɔk ˈfɔlvark] is a village in the administrative district of Gmina Zatory, within Pułtusk County, Masovian Voivodeship, in east-central Poland.
