= Drwały, Pułtusk County =

Drwały
- Village
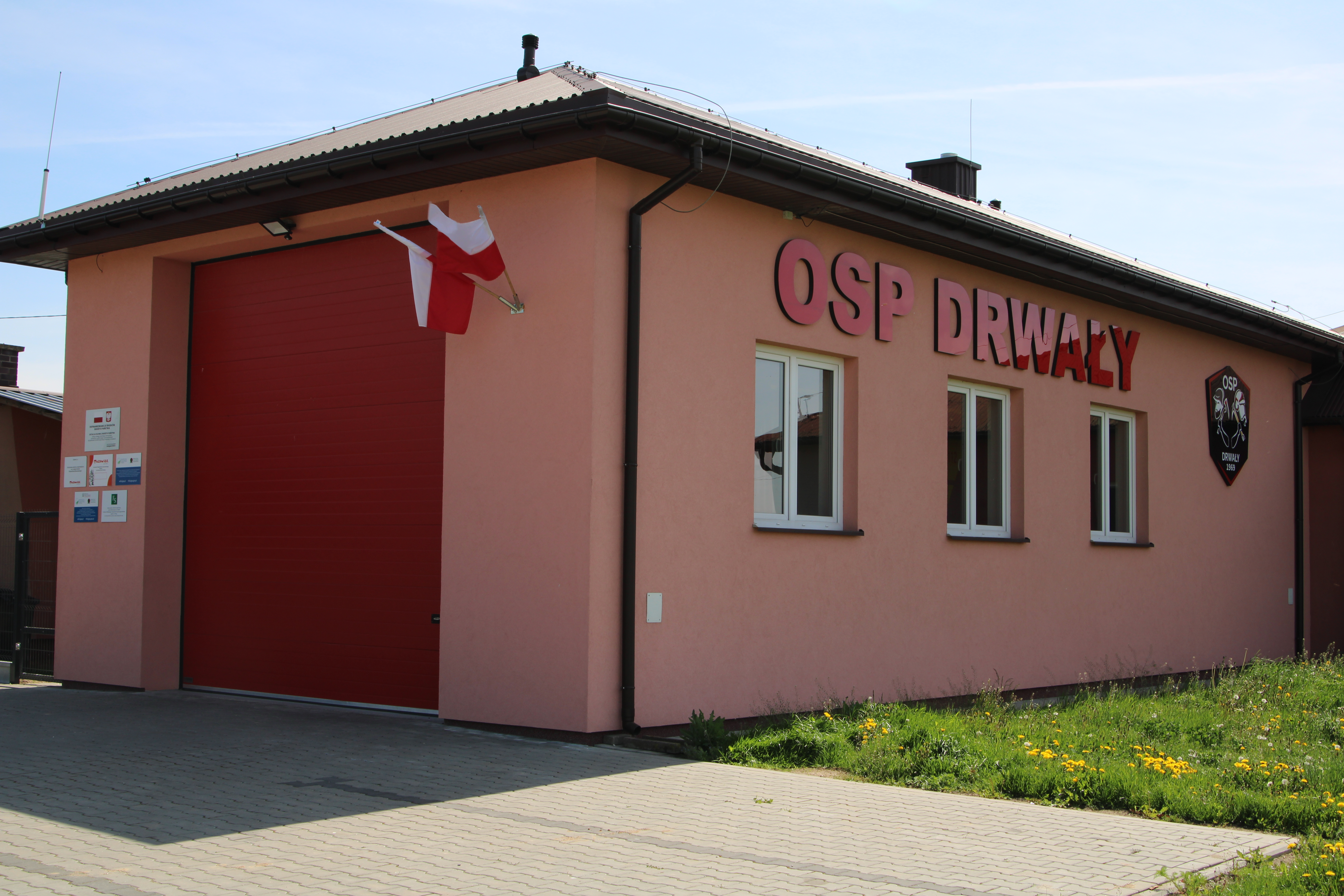

- Location within Poland
- Coordinates: 52°38′N 21°12′E
- Country: Poland
- Voivodeship: Masovian
- County: Pułtusk
- Gmina: Zatory

Drwały [ˈdrvawɨ] is a village in the administrative district of Gmina Zatory, within Pułtusk County, Masovian Voivodeship, in east-central Poland.
