= Paweł Kowal =

Polish politician (born 1975)

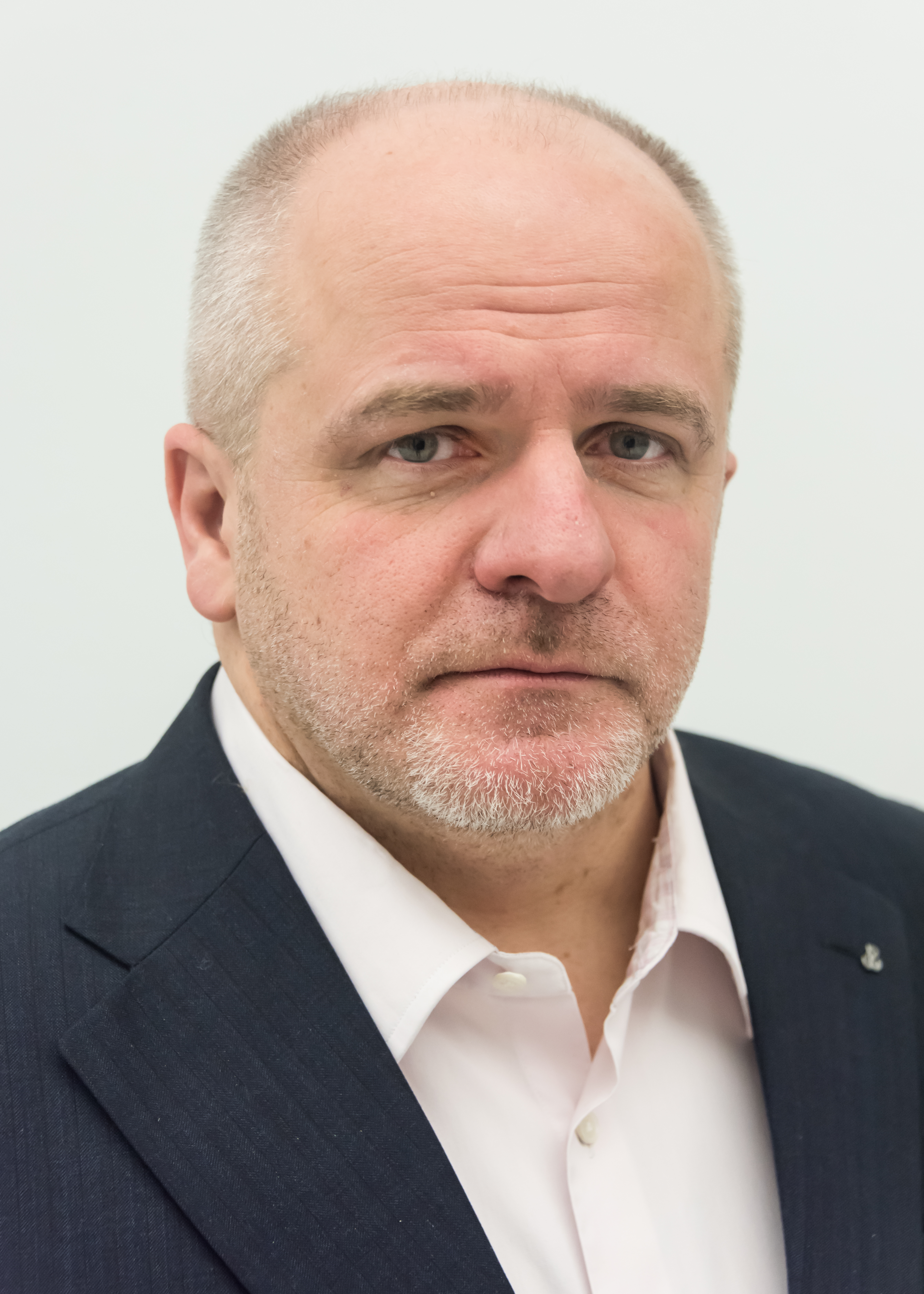

Member of the Sejm
- Incumbent
- Assumed office 13 October 2019
- Constituency: 13 – Kraków

Member of the Sejm
- In office 25 September 2005 – 10 June 2009
- Constituency: 12 – Chrzanów

Member of the European Parliament
- In office 7 June 2009 – 25 May 2014
- Constituency: Lesser Poland and Świętokrzyskie

Personal details
- Born: 22 July 1975 (age 51) Rzeszów
- Party: Civic Coalition (2019-)
- Other political affiliations: Law and Justice (2005–2010) Poland Comes First (2010-2013) Poland Together (2013-2017)
- Website: www.pawelkowal.pl

Paweł Robert Kowal (born 22 July 1975) is a Polish politician and former Member of the European Parliament. During his time in the EP, he served as the Chairman of the EU-Ukraine Parliamentary Cooperation Committee in the European Parliament.

Kowal was elected to the Sejm in the 2005 election for Law and Justice, from the 12 – Chrzanów district. He won re-election in 2007.

In 2009, he ran for the European Parliament in the Lesser Poland and Świętokrzyskie constituency. He came second amongst PiS candidates, behind Zbigniew Ziobro, taking the second Law and Justice seat won. He resigned his seat in the Sejm three days later.

During the 2010 Ukrainian presidential election Kowal was the head of the delegation of the European Parliament's observers. He joined Poland Comes First when that party split from Law and Justice in 2010. In December 2013, he joined the new centre-right Poland Together party formed by Jarosław Gowin, the former minister of justice, formerly of Civic Platform.

In 2019 he was re-elected to the Sejm from Civic Coalition. He became deputy chairman of Foreign Affairs Committee. He was re-elected in 2023 and now serves as the chairman of the Foreign Affairs Committee. As a member of the Civic Coalition, he is seen as one of the coalition's most conservative members.

== Biography ==
=== Education and early career ===
Pawel Robert Kowal graduated from Konarski Secondary School in Rzeszów. Kowal graduated from the Faculty of History at the Jagiellonian University in 1999. He studied at Collegium Invisibile in Warsaw between 1996 and 1998 under Professor Krystyna Kersten. While there, he participated in study abroad programs in Russia in Yakutia, Buryatia, and Khakassia. In 1999, he became an assistant at the Institute of Political Studies at the Polish Academy of Sciences. There Kowal defended his doctoral thesis Politics of General Wojciech Jaruzelski's administration 1986-1989. Attempts at political system reform in January 2011.

He was habilitated on 22 February 2019 at the Institute of Social Sciences of the Polish Academy of Sciences (ISP PAN) in the field of social sciences, the same year he took up the position of professor at the Institute of Political Studies of the Polish Academy of Sciences. He also became a lecturer at the University of Warsaw's Eastern European Studies Department, and took the position of head of the Postgraduate Eastern Studies there. In his scholarly work, he has taken a special interest in the issues of Poland's and the EU's eastern policy and contemporary history.

Between 1998 and 2000, Kowal worked in, amongst others, the office of the Prime Minister and the office of the head of the Polish Department of Foreign Affairs. In 2000-2001 he served as the Director of the Department of International Relations and European Integration in the Ministry of Culture and National Heritage. Between 2001 and 2003, he worked as an expert on Eastern foreign policy in the Center for International Relations. From 2003 to 2005, he was the director of the Mazovian Regional Center of Culture and the Arts. In 2003, Kowal co-founded the Warsaw Uprising Museum, and has worked as an expert for the Museum ever since. In 2005, he led the Press Office of the Mayor of Warsaw. He continues to contribute articles on international relations.

=== Political career ===
From 2002 to 2005, Kowal was the chairman of the Ochota district council in Warsaw. In the 2005 parliamentary elections, Kowal was elected to the Sejm from the okreg (electoral district) of Chrzanow as a member of Prawo i Sprawiedliwość (PiS) (Law and Justice), where he served as chairman of the Committee on Culture and Media and as vice-president of PiS in the Sejm. Between 20 July 2006 and 22 November 2007, Kowal served as Secretary of State in the Polish Ministry of Foreign Affairs in President Jaroslaw Kaczynski's cabinet. Pawel Kowal was re-elected in the 2007 Sejm elections, and served again as vice-president of PiS in the Sejm, as well as vice-president of the Foreign Affairs Committee.

Pawel Kowal was elected in 2009 to European Parliament from the Kraków electoral district. Once in Parliament, Mr. Kowal joined the Group of European Conservatives and Reformists (ECR), serving as chairman of the parliamentary delegation to Ukraine.

Pawel Kowal left Law and Justice on 22 November 2010 to become a co-founder of Polska Jest Najważniejsza (PJN) (Poland Comes First). On 4 June 2011 he was elected the President of the party. On September 7 of the same year, he was appointed to the National Security Council. In December 2013 members of PJN decided to join the newly formed Poland Together party, where Paweł Kowal became the head of the party's National Committee. In October 2019, he successfully ran in the parliamentary elections with the Civic Coalition from the Cracow region. He was re-elected in October 2023 and now serves as the chairman of the Foreign Affairs Committee.

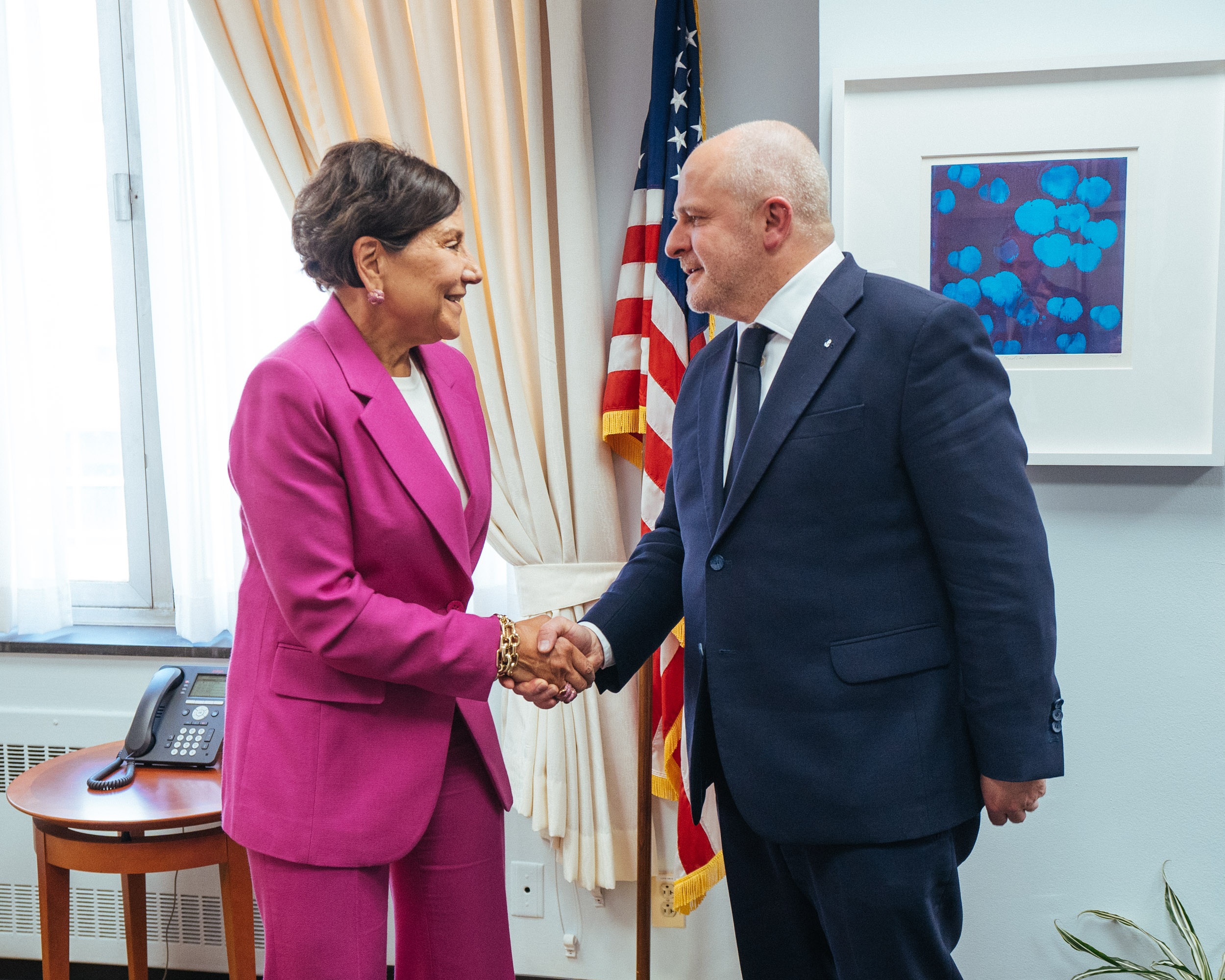
Paweł Kowal meeting with his US counterpart – Penny Pritzker, Special Representative for Ukraine's Economic Recovery

Since April 2024 he is a Chairman of the Council for Cooperation with Ukraine, government agency created by Prime Minister Donald Tusk to manage collaboration between government entities and the private sector on rebuilding Ukraine after conclusion of the Russian invasion of Ukraine.

=== Professional career ===
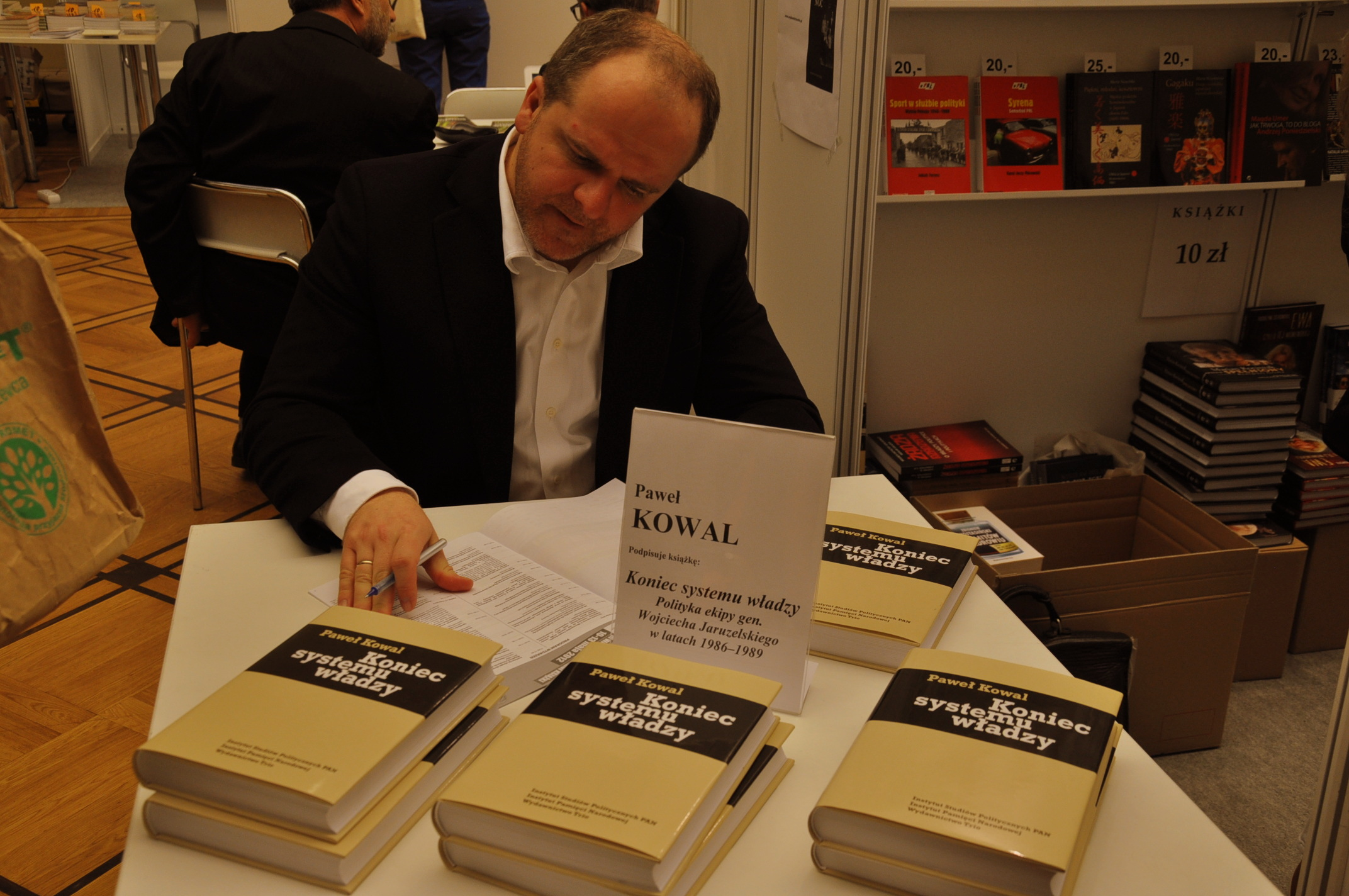
Pawel Kowal at the 2012 Warsaw Book Fair

Kowal was the chairman of the Rzeszów Youth Council. Between 1996 and 1998, he served as the president of the Jagiellonian club while working in the Miroslaw Dzielski Center in Kraków. From 1997 to 2005 he worked in the Center for Political Thought, where he managed the Polish State program for Poles in the East. Kowal is a member of Association "Polish Community," a Polish Senate-sponsored organization dedicated to building ties between Poland and Polonia, and is also an associate member of the World Association of the Home Army. Kowal has worked with the Jan Nowak-Jeziorański program of the College of Eastern Europe (Kolegium Europy Wschodniej) in Wrocław since 2007. He has also sat on the board of the Institute of Public Affairs, a Polish think tank. In 2008, he became an honorary member of the Volunteer Fire Department in Chocznia, Poland.

=== Private life ===
Kowal is married and has four children.

=== Awards and decorations ===
- Officer of the Order of Polonia Restituta – 2014
- Prof. T. Strzembosz Award – 2013
- Order of Christ the Saviour (Ukraine) – 2013
- Order of Merit (Portugal), Grand Cross – 2008
- Order of Merit, Third Class (Ukraine) – 2007 (awarded in 2009)
- Silver Medal for Merit to Culture – Gloria Artis (Poland) – 2005
- Silver Guardian Medal of the Places of National Remembrance (Poland) – 2005

== See also ==
- Poland Comes First (PJN)
- Members of Polish Sejm 2005-2007
- Members of Polish Sejm 2007-2011
- 2009 European Parliament election in Poland
- List of members of the European Parliament, 2009–2014
- List of members of the European Parliament for Poland, 2009–2014
- Members of Polish Sejm 2019–2023
- Members of Polish Sejm 2023–2027

== Publications ==
- "Only For People with Strong Nerves" (New Eastern Europe)
- "Lutsenko's Release Was A Triumph For All, Except Ukraine" (The Ukrainian Week)
- "Treat Lukashenko With Respect" (Belarus Digest)
- "Doves vs. Hawks: A post-election draw" (New Eastern Europe)

=== Academic articles ===
- Państwo polskie wobec Polaków na Wschodzie (współautor), Kraków 2000
- Włodzimierz Bączkowski. O wschodnich problemach Polski. Wybór pism (współautor), Kraków 2000, Wrocław 2005
- Nie jesteśmy ukrainofilami (współautor), Wrocław 2002, 2008
- „Wymiar wschodni” UE – szansa czy idée fixe polskiej polityki? (redaktor, współautor), Warszawa 2002
- Krajobrazy z Mistralami w tle, Kraków 2011
- Koniec systemu władzy. Polityka ekipy gen. Wojciecha Jaruzelskiego w latach 1986–1989, Warszawa 2012
- Między Majdanem a Smoleńskiem. Rozmawiają Piotr Legutko i Dobrosław Rodziewicz, Wydawnictwo Literackie, Kraków 2012
