= Łęcino =

- Village
- Location within Poland
- Coordinates: 52°38′06″N 21°07′48″E
- Country: Poland
- Voivodeship: Masovian
- County: Pułtusk
- Gmina: Zatory
- Population (2021): 17

Łęcino [wɛnˈt͡ɕinɔ] is a village in the administrative district of Gmina Zatory, within Pułtusk County, Masovian Voivodeship, in east-central Poland.
