= Śliski =

Village in Gmina Zatory, Poland

- Village
- Location within Poland
- Coordinates: 52°37′15.14″N 21°8′41.58″E
- Country: Poland
- Voivodeship: Masovian
- County: Pułtusk
- Gmina: Zatory
- Population (2021): 60

Śliski [ˈɕliski] is a village in the administrative district of Gmina Zatory, within Pułtusk County, Masovian Voivodeship, in east-central Poland.
