= Nowe Borsuki =

- Village
- Location within Poland
- Coordinates: 52°39′16″N 21°08′13″E
- Country: Poland
- Voivodeship: Masovian
- County: Pułtusk
- Gmina: Zatory

Nowe Borsuki [ˈnɔvɛ bɔrˈsuki] is a village in the administrative district of Gmina Zatory, within Pułtusk County, Masovian Voivodeship, in east-central Poland.
