= Mystkówiec-Szczucin =

- Village
- Location within Poland
- Coordinates: 52°37′04″N 21°13′49″E
- Country: Poland
- Voivodeship: Masovian
- County: Pułtusk
- Gmina: Zatory
- Population (2021): 109

Mystkówiec-Szczucin [mɨstˈkuvjɛt͡s ˈʂt͡ʂut͡ɕin] is a village in the administrative district of Gmina Zatory, within Pułtusk County, Masovian Voivodeship, in east-central Poland.
