= Rafał Bochenek =

Polish weather presenter and politician

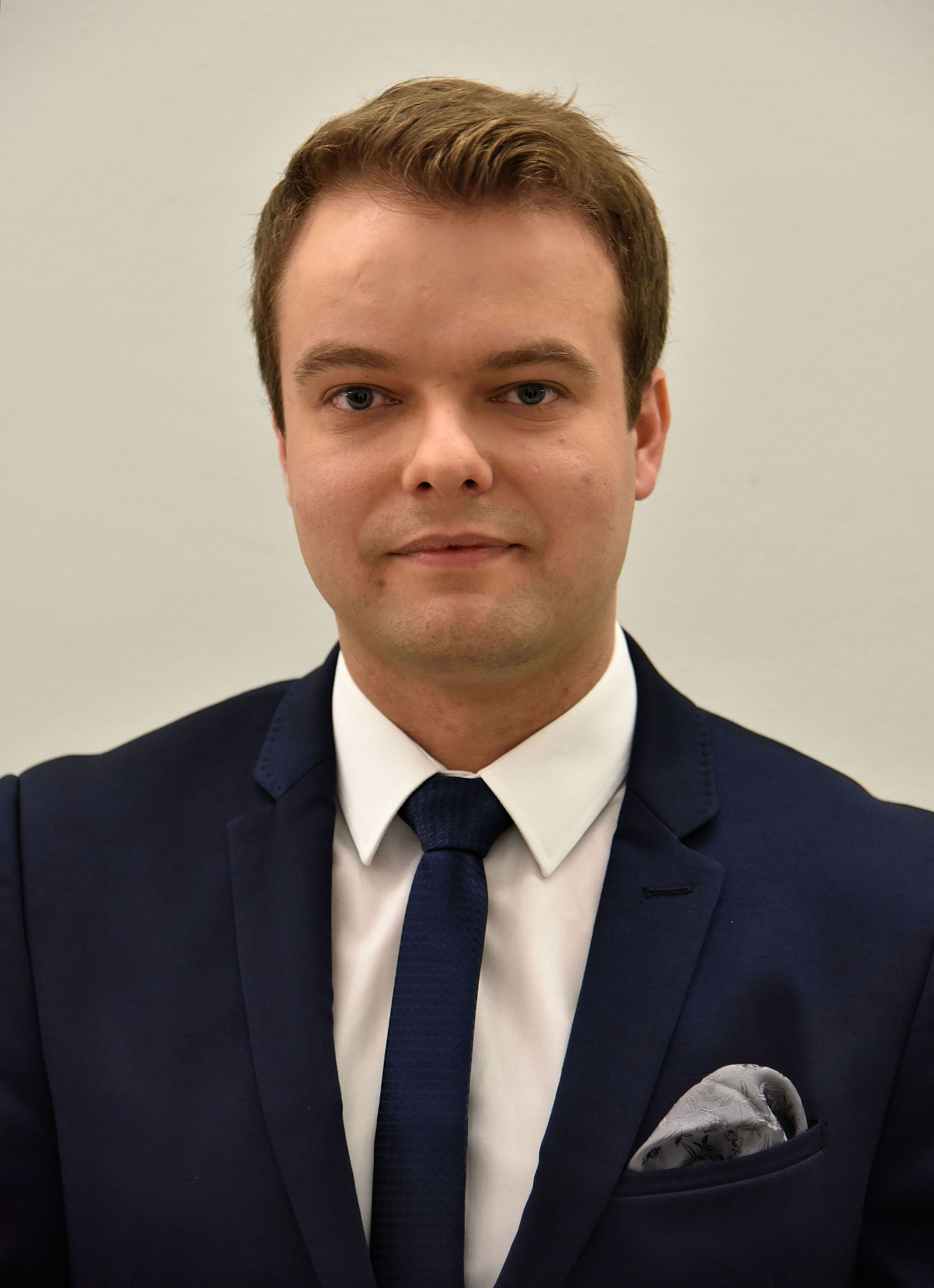

Member of the Sejm
- Incumbent
- Assumed office 13 October 2019
- Constituency: 12 - Kraków I

Chairman of Lesser Poland Voivodeship Assembly
- In office 19 November 2018 – 13 October 2019
- Preceded by: Urszula Nowogórska
- Succeeded by: Jan Duda

Spokesman of the Government of Poland
- In office 8 January 2016 – 18 December 2017
- Preceded by: Elżbieta Witek
- Succeeded by: Joanna Kopcińska

Personal details
- Born: 14 August 1986 (age 40) Kraków, Poland
- Party: Law and Justice
- Education: Jagiellonian University
- Profession: politician, parliamentarian, lawyer

Rafał Bochenek (born 14 August 1986) is a Polish lawyer and politician.

== Biography ==
Bochenek is a graduate of the Faculty of Law and Administration of the Jagiellonian University. Bochenek was a weather forecaster with TVP3 Kraków and ran a youth program. He has served for two terms as an alderman in Wieliczka and as vice-chair of the Gmina Wieliczka council. Bochenek volunteered during the 2015 Polish presidential election as a presenter during major conventions. He was the spokesman for the Government of Poland from 8 January 2016 to 18 December 2017.

During the 2018 Polish local elections held on 21 October 2018, he was elected to the Voivodeship sejmik (local assembly) of the Lesser Poland Voivodeship, and was subsequently elected Chairman of the voivodeship assembly.

During the 2019 Polish parliamentary election held on 13 October 2019, he was elected a Member of the Sejm for constitutency 12 - Kraków I, resigning his position in the Lesser Poland voivodeship assembly.
