= Topolnitsa =

Topolnitsa may refer to the following places in Bulgaria:

- Topolnitsa, Blagoevgrad Province, a village
- Topolnitsa, Kyustendil Province, a village
- Topolnitsa River
- Topolnitsa Reservoir

== See also ==
- Topolnica (disambiguation)
