= Lena Dąbkowska-Cichocka =

Polish politician

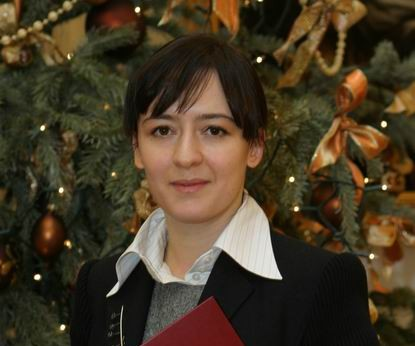
Lena Dąbkowska-Cichocka

Lena Dąbkowska-Cichocka (born November 23, 1973), is a Polish politician. She is a member of the Sejm and the Parliamentary Assembly of the Council of Europe (PACE).

== Biography ==
Lena Dąbkowska-Cichocka was born in Moscow on November 23, 1973. Formerly a member of Law and Justice, she is a member of Poland Comes First in Poland and the European Democrat Group in the PACE.
