= Dębiny, Pułtusk County =

Dębiny
- Village
- Location within Poland
- Coordinates: 52°35′47″N 21°14′23″E
- Country: Poland
- Voivodeship: Masovian
- County: Pułtusk
- Gmina: Zatory
- Population: 170

Dębiny [dɛmˈbinɨ] is a village in the administrative district of Gmina Zatory, within Pułtusk County, Masovian Voivodeship, in east-central Poland.
