= Cieńsza =

- Village
- Location within Poland
- Coordinates: 52°39′N 21°13′E
- Country: Poland
- Voivodeship: Masovian
- County: Pułtusk
- Gmina: Zatory
- Population (2021): 296

Cieńsza [ˈt͡ɕɛɲʂa] is a village in the administrative district of Gmina Zatory, within Pułtusk County, Masovian Voivodeship, in east-central Poland.
