= Poland Comes First =

Poland Comes First Polska jest Najważniejsza
- Leader: Paweł Kowal
- Founded: 16 November 2010
- Dissolved: 7 December 2013
- Split from: Law and Justice, Poland Plus
- Merged into: Poland Together
- Membership (2012): 2,300
- Ideology: Conservatism; Christian democracy Conservative liberalism Soft euroscepticism Economic liberalism
- Political position: Centre-right
- European affiliation: Alliance of European Conservatives and Reformists
- Colours: Amaranth

Website
- www.stronapjn.pl

The party's first logo (2010–11) was in the colours of the Polish flag, and emphasised the word 'Poland' (Polska).

Poland Comes First (Polish: Polska jest Najważniejsza), also rendered as Poland is the Most Important, shortened to Poland First, and abbreviated to PJN, was a centre-right, conservative liberal, political party in Poland. It was formed as a more moderate breakaway group from Law and Justice (PiS). By early 2011, the party had eighteen members of the Sejm, one member of the Senate, and three members of the European Parliament. Poland Comes First ceased to exist as a political party in December 2013, when it joined the new centre-right party led by Jarosław Gowin named Poland Together.

Spurred by the expulsion of Joanna Kluzik-Rostkowska from the party, the party was founded as a moderate, "liberal" splinter from Law and Justice, whom PJN claimed had drifted to the right under party leader Jarosław Kaczyński. More pro-free market than PiS, Poland Comes First has criticised the slow pace of economic reforms by the Civic Platform (PO) government. In 2011, the party received defectors from PO, giving it representation in the Senate. However, the party failed to win any Sejm or Senate seats in the October 2011 Parliamentary election.

In the European Parliament, its members continued to sit, along with Law and Justice, in the European Conservatives and Reformists group, of which PJN founder Michał Kamiński was the chairman until March 2011. The party was affiliated with the Alliance of European Conservatives and Reformists, of which Adam Bielan, who was one of the co-founders of the PJN but then left the party, is a Vice-President.

== History ==
On 16 November 2010, Polish MPs Joanna Kluzik-Rostkowska, Elżbieta Jakubiak and Paweł Poncyljusz, MEPs Adam Bielan and Michał Kamiński, and others formed the new group. Several of them had been expelled from the Law and Justice (PiS) party shortly before. Kamiński said that the Law and Justice party had been taken over by far-right extremists. The breakaway party formed following dissatisfaction with the direction and leadership of Jarosław Kaczyński.

The party's name comes from the official campaign slogans of Jarosław Kaczyński in the 2010 presidential election. Literally, it means 'Poland is the Most Important', which was the original English version, but the Sejm requested that this be rendered as 'Poland Comes First' in English, after Adam Bielan said that the original 'sounded strange'. The party was considering changing its name, after 'Polska jest Najważniejsza' was registered as the name of an association by a PiS supporter. The inclusion of the word 'Centre' was seen to be likely, referring to the Centre Agreement that the Kaczyńskis led before founding Law and Justice as well as reflecting its more centrist position.

On 18 January 2011, senator Jacek Swakoń, formerly of Civic Platform, joined PJN as its first senator and its first parliamentary defector other than from PiS. On 27 January 2011, the PJN's Michał Kamiński announced he would be stepping down as chairman of the ECR group, effective 8 March, citing conflict with the remaining PiS members. On 1 February, Zbigniew Wojciechowski, a recent defector from Civic Platform, replaced Janusz Palikot in the Sejm, taking the party's numbers to 18.

Joanna Kluzik-Rostkowska stated in February 2011 that she was thinking of offering Civic Platform a coalition deal after the election due in October. However, before the election, Kluzik-Rostkowska left the party for Civic Platform. Co-founder Adam Bielan MEP also left the PJN to sit as an independent, eventually joining Jarosław Gowin's new Poland Together party, whilst remaining within the ECR Group in the EU Parliament alongside the PiS MEPs.

At the October 2011 election, the party performed poorly, coming sixth in the Sejm vote with 2.2%. This being below the 5% threshold, the party failed to hold or win any seats in the Sejm. The party also failed to hold or win any seats in the Senate.

== Ideology ==
The party was formed from PiS's liberal faction. Kluzik has said the party is inspired by the centrism of David Cameron, leader of the British Conservatives. The core of the party is based around the 'Museumite' faction, connected to the Warsaw Uprising Museum, of which the PJN's Jan Ołdakowski is the director.

The party has criticised the slow pace of economic liberalisation by the Civic Platform government, challenging both Donald Tusk's frequent distractions from economic issues and Law and Justice's dirigisme. The party aims to reform the labour market, accelerate privatisation, introduce a 19% flat tax, and equalise the retirement age between men and women.

PJN sought to increase public participation within politics, public scrutiny of government, transparency in governance, and encourage local self-government. It strongly advocated diversification of Poland's energy, especially in regards to domestic production of shale-locked natural gas. PJN was also a firm supporter of Ukrainian integration into the European Union.

== Former elected representatives ==
=== Members of the Sejm ===
Before the October 2011 elections, the party had eighteen members of the Sejm.

- Lena Dąbkowska-Cichocka (21 – Opole)
- Tomasz Dudziński (7 – Chełm)
- Adam Gawęda (30 – Rybnik)
- Kazimierz Hajda (12 – Chrzanów)
- Elżbieta Jakubiak (18 – Siedlce)
- Lucjan Karasiewicz (28 – Częstochowa)
- Wiesław Kilian (3 – Wrocław)
- Wojciech Mojzesowicz (4 – Bydgoszcz)
- Jan Ołdakowski (19 – Warsaw I)
- Zbysław Owczarski (13 – Kraków)
- Jacek Pilch (15 – Tarnów)
- Paweł Poncyljusz (19 – Warsaw I)
- Andrzej Sośnierz (31 – Katowice)
- Andrzej Walkowiak (4 – Bydgoszcz)
- Zbigniew Wojciechowski (6 – Lublin)

=== Members of the Senate ===
Before the October 2011 elections, the party had one member of the Senate.

- Jacek Swakoń (1 – Legnica)

=== Members of the European Parliament ===
From October 2011 until 2013, the party had three members of the European Parliament. They continued to sit with Law and Justice in the European Conservatives and Reformists group, of which Michał Kamiński was a former Chairman.

- Michał Kamiński (4 – Warsaw)
- Paweł Kowal (10 – Lesser Poland and Świętokrzyskie)
- Marek Migalski (11 – Silesian)
