= Marek Polak =

Polish politician (born 1963)

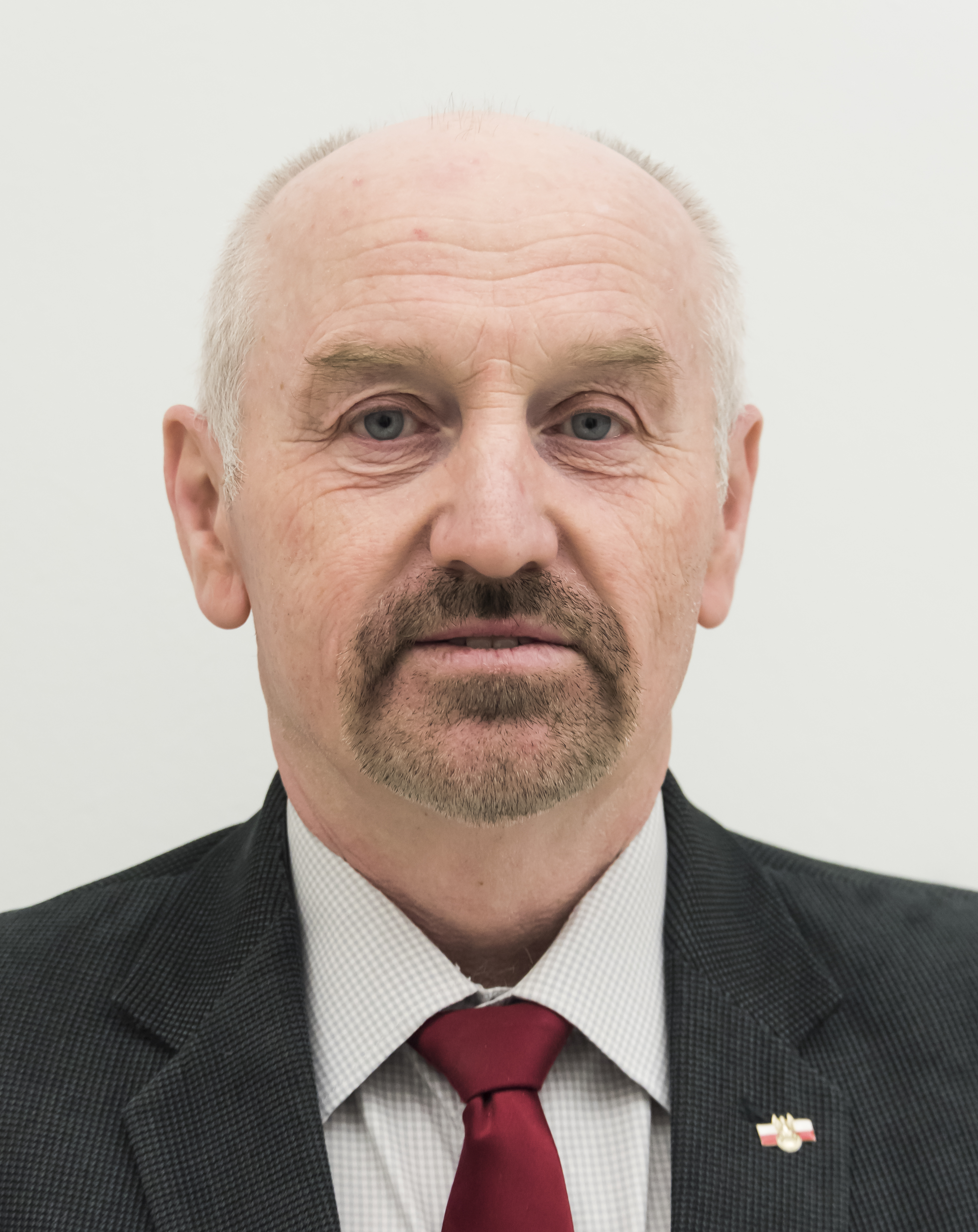

Member of the Sejm
- Incumbent
- Assumed office 25 September 2005
- Constituency: 12 – Chrzanów

Personal details
- Born: 19 November 1963 (age 62) Wadowice, Polish People's Republic
- Party: Law and Justice

Marek Władysław Polak (born 19 November 1963 in Wadowice) is a Polish politician. He was elected to the Sejm on 25 September 2005, getting 6014 votes in 12 Chrzanów district as a candidate from the Law and Justice list.

== See also ==
- Members of Polish Sejm 2005-2007
