= Gładczyn =

- Village
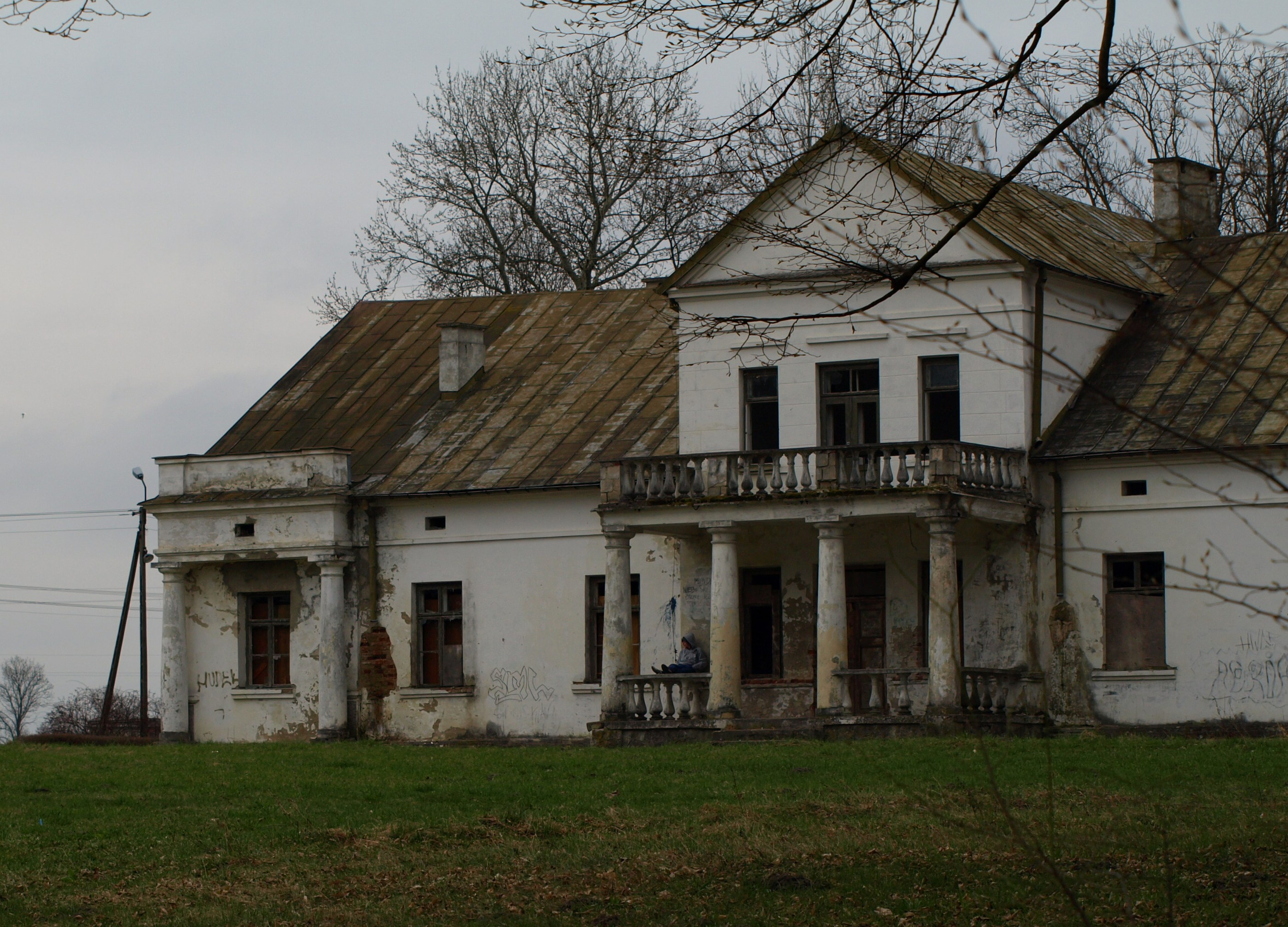
- Modzelewski family manor

- Location within Poland
- Coordinates: 52°40′05″N 21°10′22″E
- Country: Poland
- Voivodeship: Masovian
- County: Pułtusk
- Gmina: Zatory

Population (2021)
  - Total: 289

Gładczyn [ˈɡwatt͡ʂɨn] is a village in the administrative district of Gmina Zatory, within Pułtusk County, Masovian Voivodeship, in east-central Poland.
