= Filip Kaczyński =

Polish politician and government official

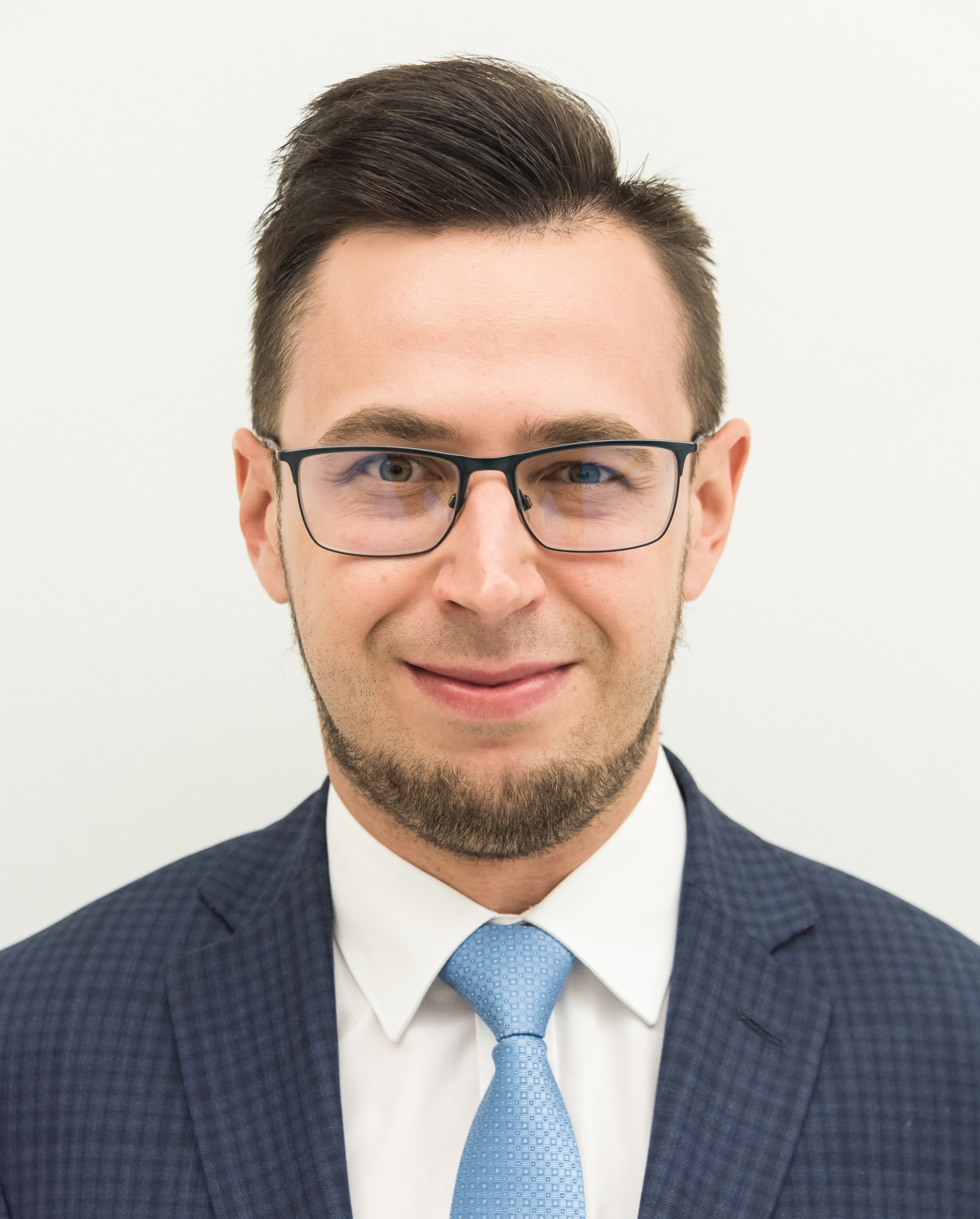
- Filip Kaczyński in 2022

Member of the Sejm
- Incumbent
- Assumed office 2019
- Constituency: 12-Kraków

Personal details
- Born: 19 November 1987 (age 38) Sucha Beskidzka, Poland
- Citizenship: Poland
- Party: Law and Justice
- Education: Higher School of Turistics and Ecology in Sucha Beskidzka
- Occupation: Politician

Filip Roman Kaczyński (born 1987) is a Polish politician and local government official who was a Member of Parliament (Sejm) in 2015, having filled a position vacated by Krzysztof Szczerski. He presently serves in the Lesser Poland Regional Assembly. He is part of the Law and Justice Party.
