= Wiktoryn, Pułtusk County =

Wiktoryn
- Village
- Location within Poland
- Coordinates: 52°36′N 21°14′E
- Country: Poland
- Voivodeship: Masovian
- County: Pułtusk
- Gmina: Zatory

Wiktoryn [vikˈtɔrɨn] is a village in the administrative district of Gmina Zatory, within Pułtusk County, Masovian Voivodeship, in east-central Poland.
