= Mystkowiec-Kalinówka =

- Village
- Location within Poland
- Coordinates: 52°37′56″N 21°14′42″E
- Country: Poland
- Voivodeship: Masovian
- County: Pułtusk
- Gmina: Zatory
- Population (2021): 116

Mystkowiec-Kalinówka [mɨstˈkɔvjɛt͡s kaliˈnufka] is a village in the administrative district of Gmina Zatory, within Pułtusk County, Masovian Voivodeship, in east-central Poland.
