= Council for Cooperation with Ukraine =

- Rada do spraw Współpracy z Ukrainą

Agency overview
- Formed: 5 April 2024
- Jurisdiction: Chancellery of the Prime Minister of Poland
- Headquarters: Building of the Chancellery of the Prime Minister, Al. Ujazdowskie 1/3, Śródmieście, Warsaw
- Agency executive: Paweł Kowal, Chairman
- Website: https://www.gov.pl/web/premier/rada-do-spraw-wspolpracy-z-ukraina

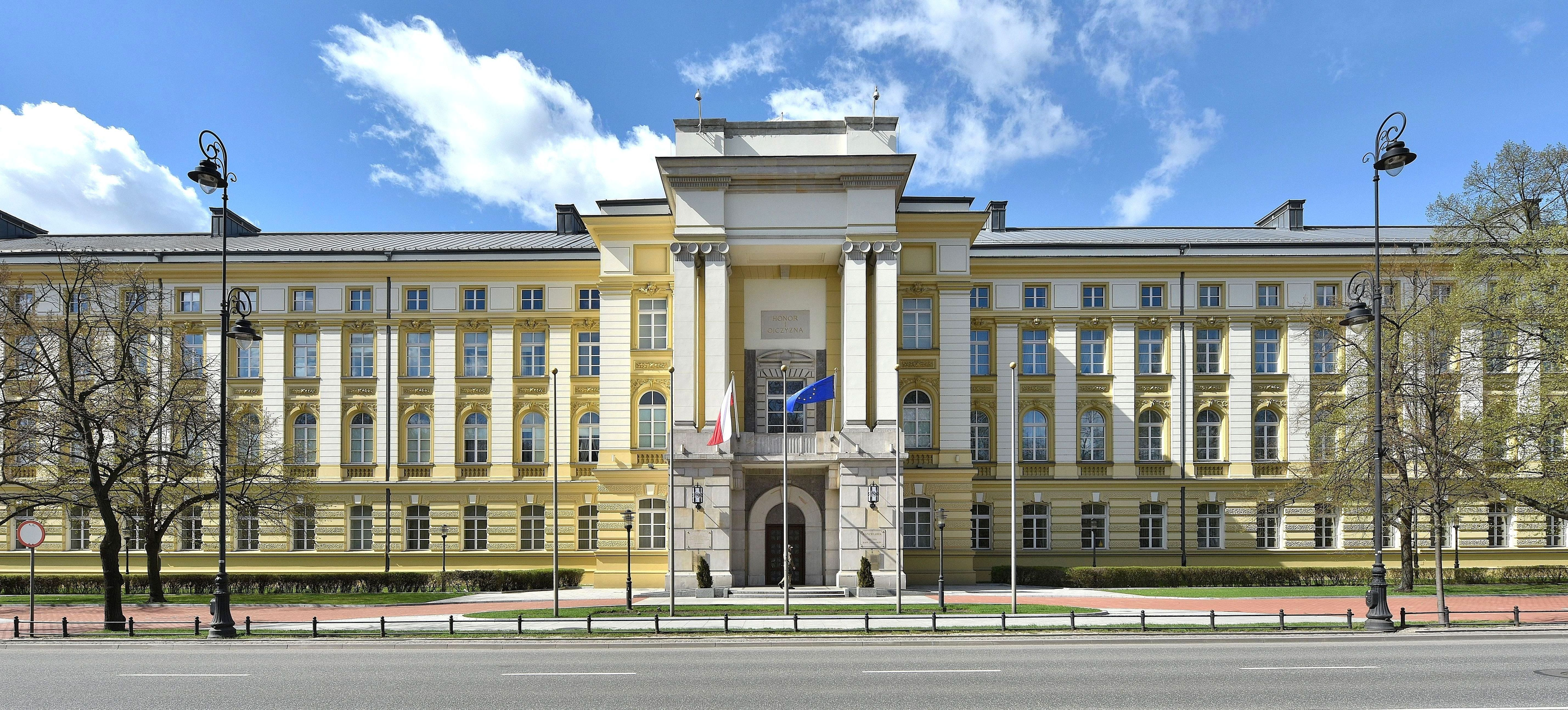
Building of the Chancellery of the Prime Minister, which houses the Council

Council for Cooperation with Ukraine (Polish: Rada do spraw Współpracy z Ukrainą) is a subsidiary body of the Prime Minister of Poland. It was established on April 5, 2024 by Prime Minister Donald Tusk. The main goal of the council is to collaborate with government entities and the private sector on rebuilding Ukraine after conclusion of the Russian invasion of Ukraine.

== Establishment ==
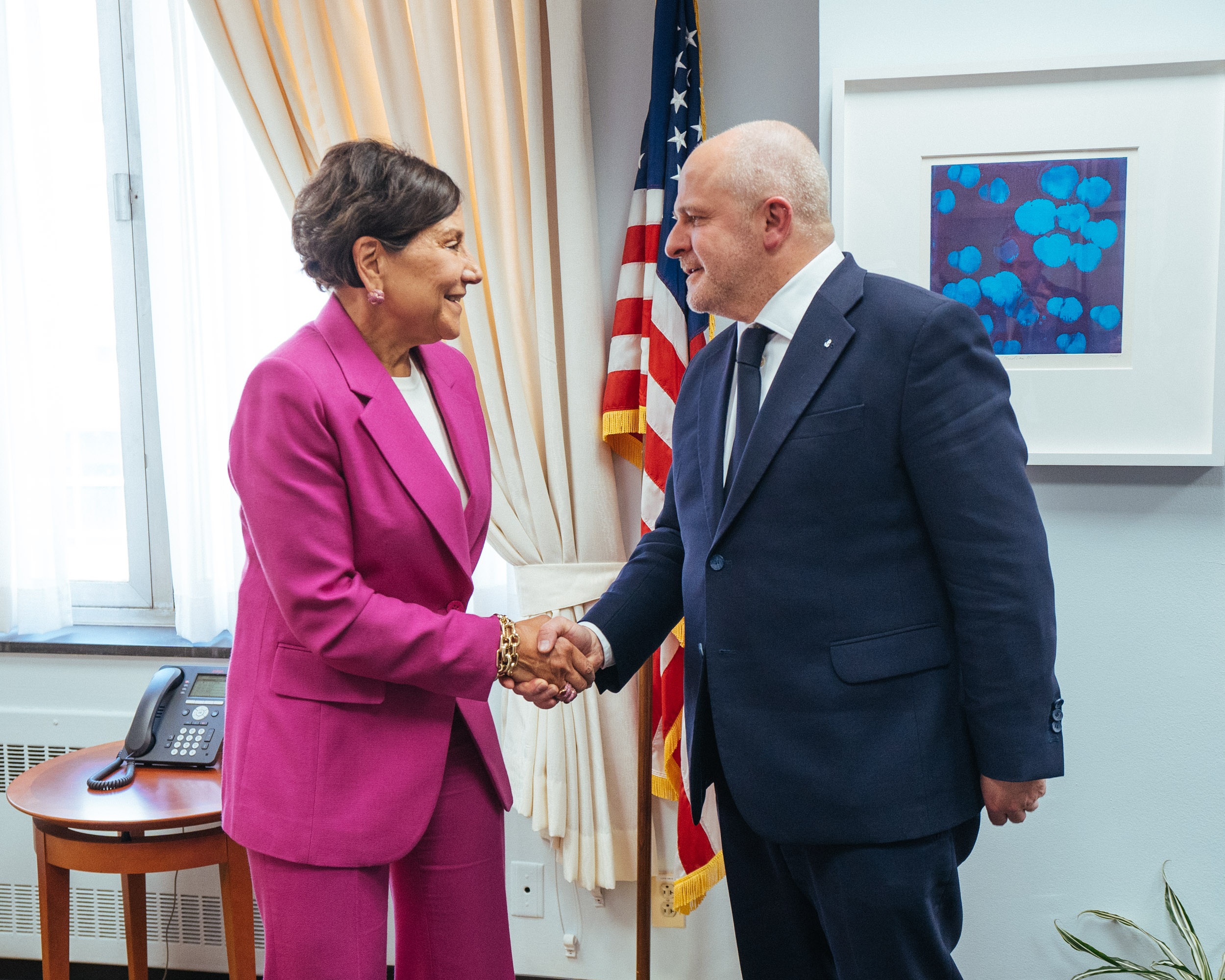
Paweł Kowal meeting with his counterpart – Penny Pritzker, U.S. Special Representative for Ukraine's Economic Recovery

On April 9, 2024, Tusk nominated Paweł Kowal, an MP of the Sejm of the Republic of Poland and the chairman of the Foreign Affairs Committee, for the post of the chairman. The chairman of the council is the Polish equivalent of envoys for the reconstruction of Ukraine from countries such as France, Germany, Italy, or the United States.

== Structure and membership ==
The council is composed of the chairman and other members appointed by the prime minister. Council is also advised by representatives of the business sector and state-owned companies. The chairman of the council directs the work of the council, chairs the meetings and represents the council externally. The chairman of the council may also appoint teams of a consultative nature or to work on particular issues, and commission studies and expert opinions. The current chairman is Paweł Kowal.

=== Operations ===
Participation in the work of the council is unpaid. The staff of civil servants accountable for assisting the work of the council is located in the Chancellery of the Prime Minister of Poland. On behalf of the council, the assignments can be carried out by the Centre for Eastern Studies (OSW) and the Polish Economic Institute, as well as the Podkaprackie Voivodeship.

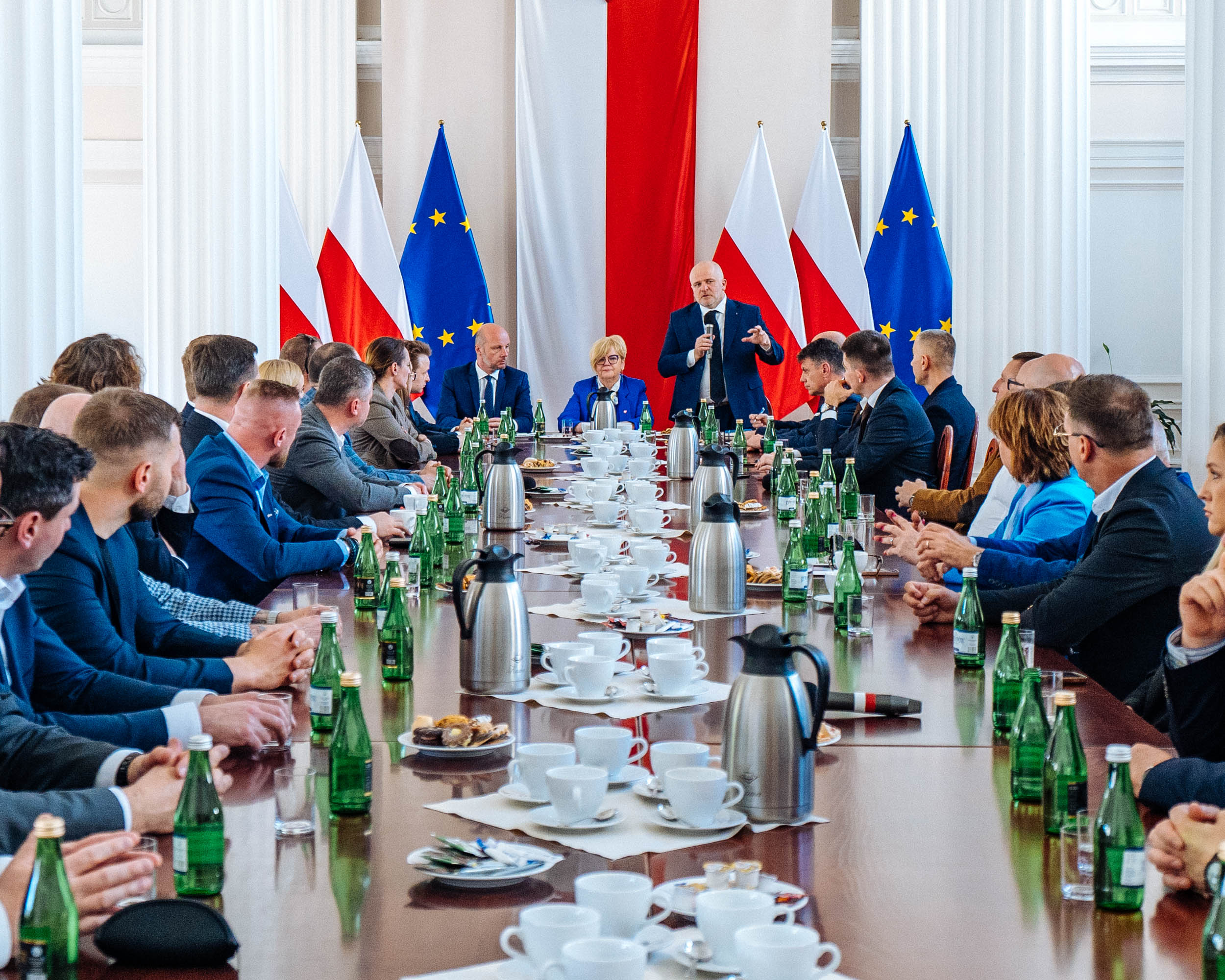
Meeting of Subcarpathian entrepreneurs with Kowal, Fijołek and Kubas-Hul

In April 2024 the council established its field offices in Rzeszów, the capital of the Subcarpathian Voivodeship. President of Rzeszów Konrad Fijołek and voivode Teresa Kubas-Hul participated in the creation of the office. The office is responsible for assisting the council's tasks and supporting visits by foreign dignitaries and of the envoys from other countries.
