= Jan Ołdakowski =

Polish politician (born 1972)

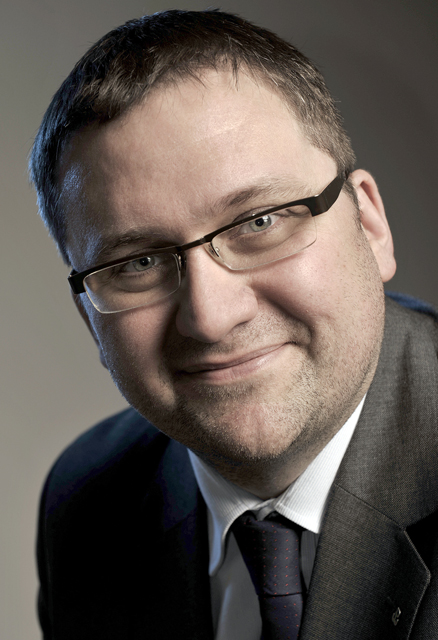

Member of the Sejm
- Incumbent
- Assumed office 25 September 2005
- Constituency: 19 – Warsaw I

Personal details
- Born: 11 May 1972 (age 53) Warsaw
- Party: Poland Comes First
- Other political affiliations: Law and Justice (2005–10)

Jan Łukasz Ołdakowski (born 11 May 1972 in Warsaw) is a Polish politician. He was elected to Sejm on 25 September 2005, getting 3939 votes in Warsaw I, standing for Law and Justice. He joined Poland Comes First when that party split from Law and Justice in 2010.

He is the manager of the Warsaw Uprising Museum.

== See also ==
- Members of Polish Sejm 2005-2007
