= Marcin Libicki =

Polish politician (born 1939)

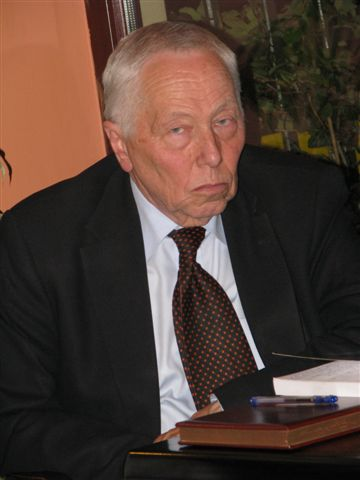
- Born: 2 February 1939 (age 87); Poznań, Poland
- Occupation: Politician
- Children: Jan Filip Libicki

Marcin Wojciech Libicki (born 2 February 1939 in Poznań) is a Polish politician, former member of the Polish parliament (Sejm), elected for the Poznań constituency.

On 13 June 2004, he was elected as a Member of the European Parliament (MEP), and when the Parliament convened he was elected chair of its Committee on Petitions.

He is a member of the Sovereign Military Order of Malta, also an alumnus of Adam Mickiewicz High School in Poznań. He is the father of Jan Filip Libicki, a member of Sejm.

== See also ==
- 2004 European Parliament election in Poland
