= Zatory =

- Village
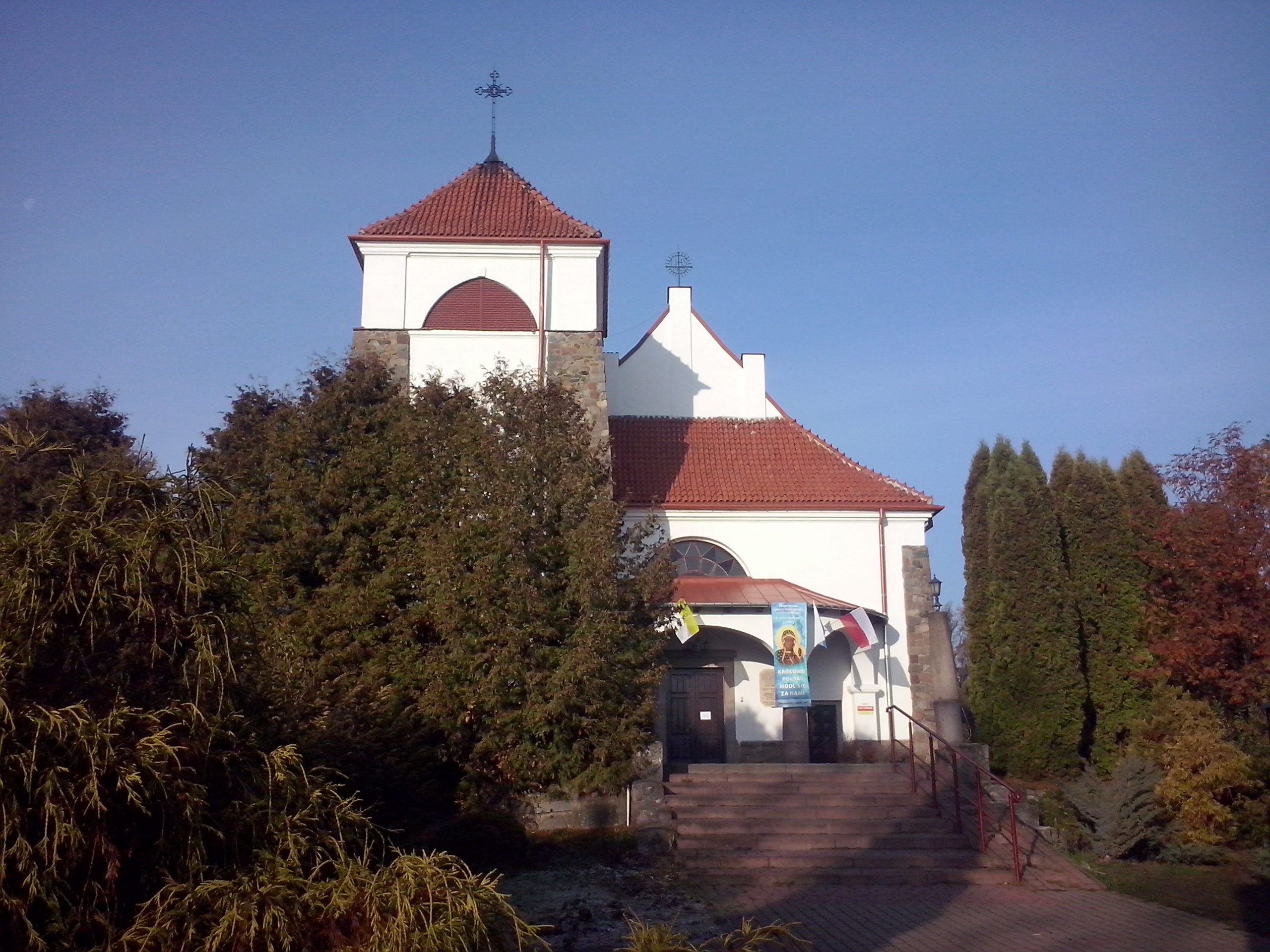
- Church of the Holy Virgin Mary

- Location within Poland
- Coordinates: 52°36′N 21°11′E
- Country: Poland
- Voivodeship: Masovian
- County: Pułtusk
- Gmina: Zatory
- Population (2021): 1,008

Zatory [zaˈtɔrɨ] is a village in Pułtusk County, Masovian Voivodeship, in east-central Poland. It is the seat of the gmina (administrative district) called Gmina Zatory.
