= Lucjan Karasiewicz =

Polish politician (born 1979)

Member of the Sejm
- Incumbent
- Assumed office 25 September 2005
- Constituency: 28 – Częstochowa

Personal details
- Born: 10 July 1979 (age 46) Tarnowskie Góry
- Party: Poland Comes First
- Other political affiliations: Law and Justice (2005–10)

Lucjan Karasiewicz (born 10 July 1979 in Tarnowskie Góry) is a Polish politician. He was elected to the Sejm on 25 September 2005, getting 6844 votes in 28 Częstochowa, standing for Law and Justice. He joined Poland Comes First when that party split from Law and Justice in 2010.

== See also ==
- Members of Polish Sejm 2005-2007
