= Andrzej Walkowiak =

Polish politician and journalist

Deputy of the Sejm
- In office 2005 – 2011
- Constituency: 4 Bydgoszcz

Personal details
- Born: 21 January 1961 (age 65) Bydgoszcz, Polish People's Republic
- Party: Poland Comes First
- Other political affiliations: Law and Justice (2005 – 2010)
- Profession: Journalist

Andrzej Walkowiak (born 21 January 1961) is a Polish politician and journalist. He was a member of the Sejm for Poland Comes First, having been a member for Law and Justice from 2005 to 2010.

He was elected to the Sejm on 25 September 2005, getting 5203 votes in 4 Bydgoszcz district, standing for Law and Justice (PiS). He joined Poland Comes First when that party split from PiS in 2010.

== Jarosław Gowin's Arrangement Court Removal ==
In February 2021, Walkowiak was removed as a member from the Arrangement of Jarosław Gowin's Arrangement Court. He was one of the founders of the Agreement. The reason for the removal is that Walkowiak introduced himself on regional television as the Chairman of the Regional Council of the Agreement. Walkowiak responded to his expulsion saying "I don't have much to say about the reasons for my expulsion, because no one talked to me. So I don't know what the charges are, no one presented them to me. I didn't have the opportunity to respond to them. This is clearly some kind of kangaroo court and it's hard to accept that such actions would take place in a democratic party."

== See also ==
- Members of Polish Sejm 2005–2007
