= Katarzyna Onyszkiewiczowa =

Deceased Galician serial killer

- Born: 1840; Chernivtsi, Kingdom of Galicia and Lodomeria
- Died: 9 March 1895 (aged 54–55); Lviv, Kingdom of Galicia and Lodomeria
- Other names: "The Female Demon"; Katarzyna Kikierczuk; Kasia Koczeczukowa; Klotylda Koczerczuk; Ksawera Onyszkiewicz; Heńka Onyszkiewiczowa; Joanna Topolnicka; Ksenia Unyszkiewicz
- Conviction: Murder x3
- Penalty: 30 years imprisonment

Details
- Victims: 3+
- Span of crimes: 1869–1870
- Country: Galicia
- Date apprehended: For the final time in 1879

Katarzyna Onyszkiewiczowa (1840 – 9 March 1895), known as the Female Demon (Polish: Demon Kobiecy) among other purported names, was a Polish thief and serial killer who was responsible for at least three murders in Galicia from 1869 to 1870. She was convicted of these deaths in separate trials, and eventually died behind bars while serving one of her sentences.

== Biography ==
Much of Onyszkiewiczowa's background is unknown, including her real name. The most popular theory is that she was born circa 1840 to a peasant family living in Chernivtsi (now part of Ukraine), and was raised in the Greek Catholic faith. In her youth, she is said to have made a living as a seamstress. Her first conviction for theft was recorded in 1858 in Chernivtsi, for which she served 6 months in prison. It was followed by another conviction in Śniatyn the next year, for which she was also given 20 hits with a rod.

After her release from prison, Onyszkiewiczowa began travelling from village to village, presenting herself as a merchant or nun, and was often accepted to sleep over at people's homes. She would then poison the male homeowners with a deadly concoction consisting of jimsonweed, cowbane and henbane, which not only paralyzed the victims, but also caused hallucinations, vomiting, convulsions and breathing difficulties, some of which proved fatal. After killing her victims, she would steal any valuables she could and flee the village, disguising herself and assuming a new name.

While her true victim count is unknown, Onyszkiewiczowa's first conviction came in 1869 in Stanisławów, for which she received a 10-year sentence at the Maria Magdalena Prison in Lviv. Only months later, however, she and another female prisoner escaped. Onyszkiewiczowa was recaptured in Kraków the following year and sent back to Lviv, where she was given an additional 10-year sentence for two further murders committed while she was on the run.

To the authorities' shock, on the night of 2 September 1879, she escaped again, and was recaptured yet again in Lviv in the spring of 1880. Her last trial caused great media interest, with crowds of onlookers gathering in front of the courthouse and the media reporting on the case extensively. For her last crimes, Onyszkiewiczowa was sentenced to an additional 10 years' imprisonment to be served concurrently with her previous sentences, and she was remanded to serve them at Lviv Prison, where she died on 9 March 1895.

== See also ==
- List of serial killers by country
