= Jan Filip Libicki =

Polish politician (born 1971)

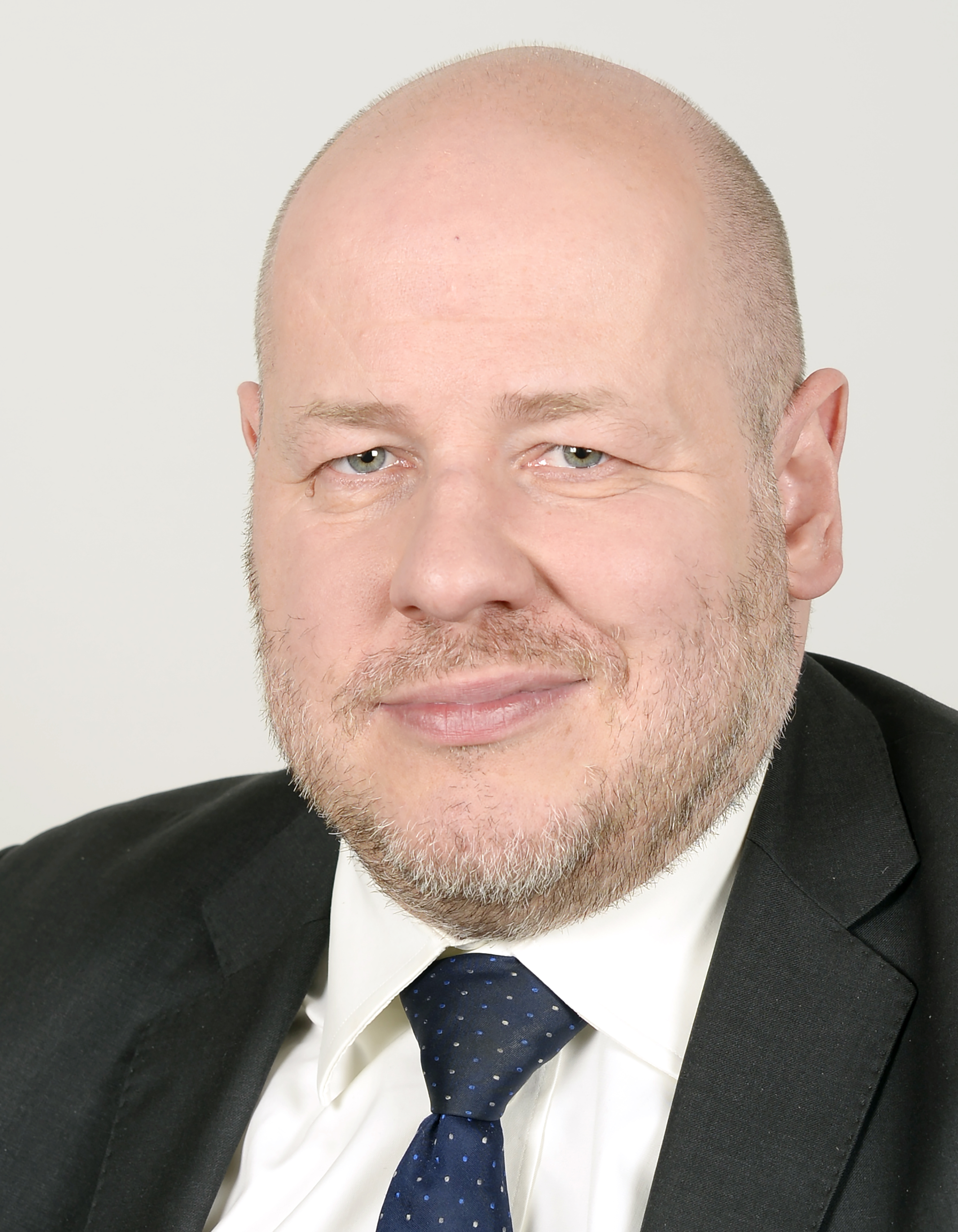

Member of the Sejm
- Incumbent
- Assumed office 25 September 2005
- Constituency: 39 – Poznań

Personal details
- Born: 17 January 1971 (age 55) Poznań
- Party: Independent
- Other political affiliations: Christian National Union (1989–2001); Right Alliance (2001–02); Law and Justice (2002–10); Poland Comes First (2010–2011); Civic Platform (2011–2018), Polish People's Party (2019-present)
- Relations: Marcin Libicki (father)

Jan Filip Libicki (born 17 January 1971 in Poznań) is a Polish politician.

== Early life ==
Jan Filip Libicki was born on 17 January 1971 in Poznań, Poland. His father, Marcin Libicki, is a member of the European Parliament. He was born with cerebral palsy. Due to his health state, he moves with a wheelchair.

== Career ==
He was elected to Sejm on 25 September 2005, getting 17503 votes in 39 Poznań district, standing for Law and Justice. He joined Poland Comes First when that party split from Law and Justice in 2010.

In 2011, he successfully ran for Poland's Senate as a Civic Platform candidate. In 2012, he officially became a member of Civic Platform. He left Civic Platform within the protest of suspending the 3 MP's of PO after voting against abortion law liberalization which was under the party discipline in that voting. Before 2019 Polish parliamentary election he joined at Polish People's Party and having been elected as a senator. He was successfully cured of COVID-19 being hospitalized for a few weeks.

== Views ==
Libicki supports banning abortion in case of fetal abnormalities. He opposes introduction of civil unions in Poland. He identifies as Catholic.

== See also ==
- Members of Polish Sejm 2005-2007
