= Przyłubie, Masovian Voivodeship =

Przyłubie
- Village
- Location within Poland
- Coordinates: 52°35′05″N 21°12′37″E
- Country: Poland
- Voivodeship: Masovian
- County: Pułtusk
- Gmina: Zatory
- Population (2021): 55

Przyłubie [pʂɨˈwubjɛ] is a village in the administrative district of Gmina Zatory, within Pułtusk County, Masovian Voivodeship, in east-central Poland.
