= Topolnica, Poland =

Topolnica
- Village
- Location within Poland
- Coordinates: 52°40′N 21°14′E
- Country: Poland
- Voivodeship: Masovian
- County: Pułtusk
- Gmina: Zatory
- Population (2021): 128

Topolnica [tɔpɔlˈnit͡sa] is a village in the administrative district of Gmina Zatory, within Pułtusk County, Masovian Voivodeship, in east-central Poland.
