= Sejm Constituency no. 12 =

Polish parliamentary constituency

Coordinates: 50°08′00″N 19°24′00″E

- Okręg wyborczy nr 12
- Constituency for the Sejm
- Location within Poland.
- Counties: Chrzanów, Myślenice, Oświęcim, Sucha, Wadowice
- Voivodeship: Lesser Poland
- Population: 638,595 (June 2023)
- Electorate: 492,566 (2023)
- Major settlements: Oświęcim, Chrzanów, Andrychów, Trzebinia, Myślenice, Wadowice, Libiąż, Brzeszcze, Sucha Beskidzka, Chełmek, Sułkowice, Dobczyce, Jordanów, Kalwaria Zebrzydowska, Alwernia, Zator

Current constituency
- Created: 2001
- Seats: 8
- Regional assembly: Lesser Poland Voivodeship Sejmik
- Senate constituency: no. 30
- EP constituency: Lesser Poland and Świętokrzyskie

Sejm Constituency no. 12 (Polish: Okręg wyborczy nr 12) elects 8 deputies to the Sejm (Polish parliament lower house) and covers geographical area of following counties within western part of the Lesser Poland Voivodeship: Chrzanów, Myślenice, Oświęcim, Sucha and Wadowice.

== List of deputies ==
Deputies of the 9th Sejm (2019–2023)
Deputy	Party
Rafał Bochenek	Law and Justice
Ewa Filipiak	Law and Justice
Filip Kaczyński	Law and Justice
Krzysztof Kozik	Law and Justice
Władysław Kurowski	Law and Justice
Dorota Niedziela	Civic Platform
Marek Polak	Law and Justice
Marek Sowa	Civic Platform
