= Wrocław City Council =

Local government body in Wrocław, Poland

City Council of Wrocław Rada Miejska Wrocławia

Type
- Type: Unicameral

Leadership
- Chairwoman: Agnieszka Rybczak, KO
- Vice-Chairpersons: Dorota Pędziwiatr, L Magdalena Razik-Trziszka, KO; Łukasz Olbert, PiS

Structure
- Seats: 37
- Political groups: Mayoral coalition (26): Civic Coalition (18); The Left (7); Independent (1); Opposition (11): Law and Justice (8); Let's Fix the Future (3)

Elections
- Voting system: Multi-member electoral districts with five-year terms
- Last election: 7 April 2024
- Next election: 2029

Website
- www.rada.wroc.pl

The Wrocław City Council is the governing body of Wrocław. The council has 37 elected members elected every five years in an election by city voters through a secret ballot. The election of City Council and the local head of government, which takes place at the same time, is based on legislation introduced on 20 June 2002.

== Members of the Wrocław City Council ==
Party	District 1	District 2	District 3	District 4	District 5	District 6	District 7
Civic Coalition	Izabela Duchnowska; Igor Wójcik; Krzysztof Zalewski	Piotr Uhle; Maciej Zieliński; Ewa Wrońska	Agnieszka Rybczak; Jakub Nowotarski; Joanna Pieczyńska	Robert Leszczyński; Edyta Skuła; Agnieszka Dusza; Sebastian Lorenc	Martyna Stachowiak; Tadeusz Grabarek; Jakub Janas	Dominika Kontecka; Robert Suligowski; Sławomir Czerwiński	Magdalena Razik-Trziszka; Mateusz Żak; Ewa Wolak; Marzena Bogusz
Law and Justice	Łukasz Kasztelowicz	Karolina Mrozowska	Andrzej Kilijanek	Robert Pieńkowski	Dariusz Piwoński	Łukasz Olbert; Sławomir Śmigielski	Michał Kurczewski
The Left and Localists	Dominik Kłosowski	Anna Kołodziej	Jarosław Krauze	Jacek Sutryk	Bartłomiej Ciążyński	Robert Maślak	

== Election results ==
=== 2024 ===
All 37 seats on the city council were being contested in the 2024 election.

Party	Votes	%	Seats
Civic Coalition	98,653	42.13	23
Law and Justice	50,275	21.47	8
The Left and Localists	33,229	14.19	6
Third Way	19,707	8.42	0
Confederation There is One Poland Nonpartisans	14,377	6.14	0
Bezpartyjni Samorządowcy	10,006	4.27	0
Wrocławians for Wrocławians	7,724	3.30	0
Comrades for Wrocław	197	0.08	0
Total	234,168	100.00	37
Source: National Electoral Commission

=== 2018 ===
All 37 seats on the city council were being contested in the 2018 election.

Party	Votes	%	Seats
Platform.Modern Civic Coalition	89,199	34.96	17
Law and Justice	67,745	26.55	13
Committee of Rafał Dutkiewicz - Alliance for Wrocław	36,252	14.21	7
Nonpartisan Wrocław	20,034	7.85	0
Nonpartisan Civic Movement of Jerzy Michalak	15,150	5.94	0
Kukiz'15	9,289	3.64	0
The Greens	6,791	2.66	0
Wrocław for Everybody	6,635	2.60	0
Committee of Jarek Bogusławski	1,572	0.62	0
Free and Solidary	1,224	0.48	0
We Are From Here	955	0.37	0
Committee of Mateusz Adamczyk	287	0.11	0
Total	255,133	100.00	37
Source: National Electoral Commission

=== 2014 ===
All 37 seats on the city council were being contested in the 2014 election.

Party	Votes	%	Seats
Rafał Dutkiewicz With Platform	63,674	37.70	21
Law and Justice	45,860	27.15	14
Bezpartyjni Samorządowcy	16,202	9.59	1
SLD Left Together	14,144	8.37	1
New Right – Janusz Korwin-Mikke	8,453	5.00	0
Polish People's Party	6,120	3.62	0
Wrocław Civic Initiative	5,182	3.07	0
The Greens	3,331	1.97	0
National Movement	1,925	1.14	0
Fighting Solidarity	1,542	0.91	0
Let's Do Something	762	0.45	0
Wrocław Left	641	0.38	0
Monarchists	620	0.37	0
Wrocław 50+	239	0.14	0
Students Extra Class	199	0.12	0
Total	168,894	100.00	37
Source: National Electoral Commission

=== 2010 ===
All 37 seats on the city council were being contested in the 2010 election.

Party	Votes	%	Seats
Committee of Rafał Dutkiewicz	80,056	41.90	19
Civic Platform	50,325	26.34	10
Law and Justice	33,263	17.41	7
Democratic Left Alliance	18,524	9.69	1
Polish People's Party	1,768	0.93	0
Polish Wrocław	1,525	0.80	0
Social Movement Wrocławianie	1,134	0.59	0
Christian Social Initiative	1,100	0.58	0
Agreement Citizens for Wrocław	992	0.52	0
Huby 2010	932	0.49	0
KWW skuteczniedoprzodu.pl	892	0.47	0
Wrocławianie 2010	284	0.15	0
Better Wrocław	147	0.08	0
Red Wrocław	135	0.07	0
Total	191,077	100.00	37
Source: National Electoral Commission

=== 2006 ===
All 37 seats on the city council were being contested in the 2006 election. The number of seats was lowered from 40 to 37.

Party	Votes	%	Seats
Civic Platform	64,376	32.76	14
Committee of Rafał Dutkiewicz	48,284	24.57	10
Law and Justice	46,901	23.87	11
SLD+SDPL+PD+UP Left and Democrats	23,335	11.88	2
League of Polish Families	4,124	2.10	0
Self-Defence of the Republic of Poland	2,478	1.26	0
Polish People's Party	1,575	0.80	0
Young Wrocław	2,478	1.26	0
Green Wrocław	1,277	0.65	0
Wrocław 2010 - Agreement of Social Democrats	1,188	0.60	0
Motivation of Success	452	0.23	0
Slavic Union	21	0.01	0
Total	196,489	100.00	37
Source: National Electoral Commission

=== 2002 ===
All 40 seats on the city council were being contested in the 2002 election.

Party	Votes	%	Seats
Committee of Rafał Dutkiewicz	54,656	34.26	19
Democratic Left Alliance – Labour Union	39,057	24.48	15
League of Polish Families	16,685	10.46	3
Bloc of Frasyniuk	16,223	10.17	3
Self-Defence of the Republic of Poland	11,891	7.45	0
Our Wrocław	7,033	4.41	0
Wrocław Self-Government Forum	6,220	3.90	0
Together for Poland	3,345	2.10	0
Orange Alternative	1,547	0.97	0
Polish People's Party	1,538	0.96	0
Stars in Hair	1,355	0.85	0
Total	159,550	100.00	40
Source: National Electoral Commission
