= Local elections in Poland =

Local elections in Poland consist of elections to local assemblies and elections of municipality, town and city mayors. Elections are ruled by the prime minister and are held together between 3 and 4 months before the end of the five year term of local assemblies. The last local elections took place in April 2024.

== Results ==
=== Voivodship councils ===
Only includes parties with obtained seats.

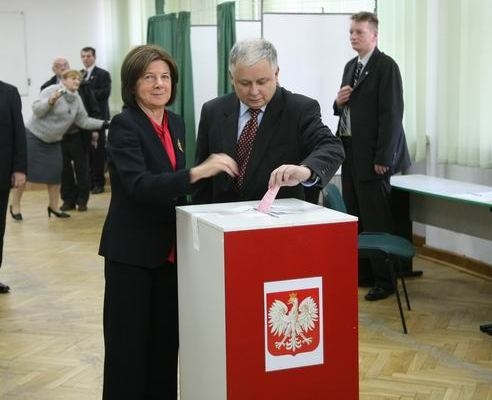
Lech and Maria Kaczyński

Electoral committee	2002	2006	2010	2014	2018
Democratic Left Alliance	24.65% 189 (Note: in alliance with Labour Union)	14.25% 66 (Note: as part of Left and Democrats)	15.2% 85	8.79% 28	6.62% 11
Civic Platform	16.55% 100 (Note: includes parties running separately in the Masovian Voivodeship (respectively 5 seats for PO and 10 for PiS), as well as the regional list in the Subcarpathian Voivodeship)	27.18% 186	30.89% 222	26.29% 179	26.97% 194 (Note: together with Modern)
Law and Justice	16.55% 100	25.08% 170	23.05% 141	26.89% 171	34.13% 254
Self-Defence of the Republic of Poland	15.98% 101	5.64% 37	—	—	—
League of Polish Families	14.36% 92	4.74% 11	—	—	—
Polish People's Party	10.81% 58	13.24% 83	16.30% 93	23.88% 157	12.07% 70
Freedom Union	2.29% 3	—	—	—	—
Nonpartisan Local Government Activists	—	—	—	0.85% 4	5.28% 15
regionalists (with seats)	2.60% 17 (Note: German Minority Electoral Committee - 7, Lesser Poland Association - 5, Silesian Voivodeship Local Government Association - 4)	0.66% 8 (Note: German Minority Electoral Committee - 7, Local Government Agreement - 1)	3.69% 20 (Note: Rafał Dutkiewicz Committee - 9, German Minority Electoral Committee - 6, Silesian Autonomy Movement - 3, National Local Government Association - 1, Local Government Agreement - 1)	2.48% 16 (Note: German Minority Electoral Committee - 7, Silesian Autonomy Movement - 4, Better Lubuskie - 2, Greater Poland Now - 2, Nonpartisans West Pomerania - 1)	1.13% 8 (Note: German Minority Electoral Committee - 5, With Dutkiewicz for Lower Silesia - 2, Bogdan Wenta's Świętokrzyskie Project - 1)
