= Arkadiusz Sikora =

Polish politician and economist (born 1973)

- Sikora in 2026.

Member of the Sejm of Poland
- Incumbent
- Assumed office 13 November 2023
- Constituency: No. 1

Member of the Wrocław City Council
- In office 18 November 2002 – 12 November 2006
- Constituency: No. 7

Personal details
- Born: 20 June 1973 (age 53) Głubczyce, Poland
- Party: New Left
- Other political affiliations: Democratic Left Alliance; Democratic Party
- Children: 1
- Education: Wrocław University of Economics
- Occupation: Politician, business executive, civil servant

Arkadiusz Sikora (Polish: [arˈka.djuʂ ɕiˈkɔ.ra]; born 20 June 1973) is a Polish politician, economist, and business executive. Since 2023, he is a member of the Sejm of Poland, representing the constituency no. 1, centered on the cities of Jelenia Góra and Legnica in Lower Silesian Voivodeship. He is a member of the New Left party, and previously belonged to the Democratic Left Alliance and the Democratic Party.

== Biography ==
Arkadiusz Sikora was born on 20 June 1973 in the town of Głubczyce in Opole Voivodeship, Poland. In 1997, he graduated with a degree in finance and banking from the Wrocław University of Economics. Sikora worked in the banking sector and for the company DSI, a subsidiary of KGHM Polska Miedź. From 2003 to 2011, he was a head specialist in the Budget and Finance Department of the Lower Silesian Voivodeship Marshal Office in Wrocław. He was also a deputy director of the Wrocław Cultural and Arts Centre, and a deputy director of the Spartan Wrocław Training Centre. From 2000 to 2002, Sikora was a deputy chairperson of the association handball team Śląsk Wrocław, and from 2013 to 2023, he was a deputy chairperson of the Association of Directors of Local Government Cultural Institutions.

Sikora was a member of the party Democratic Left Alliance, and from 2000 to 2002, he was the chairperson of the Lower Silesian Voivodeship division of its youth wing, the Young Democratic Left Association. During the 2002 local election, he was elected to a seat in the Wrocław City Council, serving from 18 November 2002 to 12 November 2006. He received 1.250 votes (6.03%). In 2005, he left the Democratic Left Alliance, and joined the Democratic Party. During the 2005 parliamentary election, he was its candidate to a seat in the Sejm of Poland, from the constituency no. 3, centered on the city of Wrocław in Lower Silesian Voivodeship. He did not receive the mandate, gaining 292 votes (0.08%). He unsuccessfully run for the election to the Wrocław City Council during the 2006 local election, being on the electoral list of the electoral alliance Left and Democrats, receiving 1,760 votes (5.74%). Afterwards, he returned to the Democratic Left Alliance, and in 2016, he became the secretary of the party structures in Lower Silesian Voivodeship.

During the 2018 election, he unsuccessfully run for a seat in the Lower Silesian Voivodeship Sejmik, receiving 4,568 votes (1.79%). In the 2019 election, he again unsuccessfully run for a seat in the Sejm from the constituency no. 3, centred on the city of Wrocław. He received 8,510 votes (1.3%). In February 2020, the Democratic Left Alliance merged with the Spring party, forming the New Left. In 2021, together he became a deputy chairperson of the Lower Silesian Voivodeship division of the party, sharing the office with Krzysztof Śmiszek. During the 2023 election, he was elected to the Sejm from the constituency no. 1, centered on the cities of Jelenia Góra and Legnica in Lower Silesian Voivodeship. He received 12,048 votes (2.4%). In 2024 election, he unsuccessfully run for a seat in the European Parliament from the constituency no. 12, consisting of Lower Silesian and Opole Voivodeships. He received 1,936 votes (0.17%).

== Personal life ==
Sikora has a wife and a daughter. He resides in the town of Oleśnica in Lower Silesian Voivodeship, Poland.

== Electoral results ==
Year	Office		Party	Constituency	Votes			Result	Ref.
Year	Office		Party	Constituency	Total	%	P.	Result	Ref.
2002	Wrocław City Council	4th	Democratic Left Alliance and Labour Union	No. 7	1,250	6.03	5th	Won	
2005	Sejm of Poland	5th	Democratic Party	No. 3	292	0.08	131st	Lost	
2006	Wrocław City Council	5th	Left and Democrats	No. 5	1,760	5.74	3th	Lost	
2018	Lower Silesian Voivodeship Sejmik	6th	Democratic Left Alliance, The Left, and Together	No. 1	4,568	1.79	13th	Lost	
2019	Sejm of Poland	9th	Democratic Left Alliance	No. 3	12,048	2.40	21st	Lost	
2023	Sejm of Poland	10th	New Left	No. 1	12,048	2.40	9th	Won	
2024	European Parliament	10th	The Left	No. 12	1,936	0.17	42nd	Lost	
