= Citizens of Lower Silesia =

Citizens of Lower Silesia Obywatelski Dolny Śląsk
- Abbreviation: ODŚ
- Leader: Rafał Dutkiewicz
- Founded: 26 January 2008
- Registered: 2 April 2008
- Headquarters: Legnicka 21, 53-671 Wrocław
- Youth wing: Young Lower Silesia
- Membership (2011): 350
- Ideology: Regionalism; Decentralization; Conservatism
- Political position: Centre-right
- National affiliation: Civic Platform; Union of European Democrats; Poland Together
- Regional affiliation: With Dutkiewicz for Lower Silesia
- Colors: Gray; Red; Yellow
- Sejm: 0 / 460
- Senate: 0 / 100
- European Parliament: 0 / 53
- Regional Assemblies: 0 / 552

Citizens of Lower Silesia (Polish: Obywatelski Dolny Śląsk, ODŚ) is a centre-right Polish political party operating in the Lower Silesian Voivodeship, founded on 26 January 2008 and registered on 2 April 2008. Until 5 February 2011 it operated as Lower Silesia XXI (Polish: Dolny Śląsk XXI, DŚ XXI). The youth branch of the organisation is Young Lower Silesia.

== History ==
The Lower Silesia XXI Association was founded by MP Kazimierz Michał Ujazdowski and a councillor of the Lower Silesian Voivodeship Sejmik Paweł Wróblewski, who left Law and Justice party in December 2007. Paweł Wróblewski became President of DŚ XXI. Initially, the party's ranks were made up mainly of former Law and Justice activists and local government officials associated with the Mayor of Wrocław Rafał Dutkiewicz, who himself joined the party in mid-March 2008, becoming head of the program council. Other members of DŚ XXI included academics Tadeusz Luty and Adolf Juzwenko. Lower Silesia XXI was established as the first of the regional associations that on 27 September 2008 co-founded the nationwide Civic Movement ‘Polska XXI’, which was led by Rafał Dutkiewicz until 13 June 2009.

On 30 April 2009, in the Voivodeship Sejmik of the Lower Silesian Voivodeship, the parliamentary group of DŚ XXI was formed from the transformation of the Civic Platform Self-Government group (Polish: Obywatelska Platforma Samorządowa), which included councillors elected from the Law and Justice (PiS) and Civic Platform (PO) lists. It found itself in opposition to the PO-PSL coalition. Patryk Wild became its leader. At the end of the term, the group had 6 members, who, in addition to the heads of the club and the association, were: Andrzej Łoś - who at the beginning of the term was provincial marshal - as well as Ewa Rzewuska, Dariusz Stasiak and Jerzy Zieliński.

In January 2010, the Polska XXI movement was transformed into the Poland Plus party, in which, however, among the leaders of Lower Silesia XXI, only Kazimierz Michał Ujazdowski was included. The provincial plenipotentiary of Poland Plus was DŚ XXI activist Tomasz Kołodziej. In September of the same year, the party dissolved, and Kazimierz Michał Ujazdowski, who was the head of its parliamentary circle, rejoined the Law and Justice party along with most of its activists, withdrawing from the party.

Lower Silesia XXI ran in the 2010 Polish local elections, among others, for the local assembly as the Electoral Committee of Rafał Dutkiewicz. In the provincial assembly elections, it came second behind PO, winning 9 out of 36 seats. They were won by: Marek Laryś, Andrzej Łoś, Janusz Marszałek, Tymoteusz Myrda, Marek Obrębalski, Ewa Rzewuska, Dariusz Stasiak, Paweł Wróblewski (who became vice-chairman of the Sejmik) and Patryk Wild (who again became head of the DŚ XXI club). The DŚ XXI club was again in opposition to the PO-SLD-PSL coalition. Rafał Dutkiewicz was re-elected in the election for mayor of Wrocław in the first round, winning 71.63% of the vote. In addition, among the activists of DŚ XXI, Robert Raczyński became a mayor of Lubin (running from his own committee), and Piotr Roman was elected the mayor of Bolesławiec. In addition, Wojciech Murdzek became president of Świdnica with the support of the party, becoming its member. Rafał Dutkiewicz's committee won a majority of seats in the Wrocław council. Committees associated with DŚ XXI also ran in individual districts.

On 5 February 2011, the association was transformed. It took the name ‘Citizens of Lower Silesia’ and Rafał Dutkiewicz became its president. At the time, it had around 350 members affiliated in 19 parliamentary groups.

For the 2011 Polish parliamentary election, Rafał Dutkiewicz established the nationwide Union of Presidents - Citizens for the Senate (Polish: Unia Prezydentów – Obywatele do Senatu) movement. Seven ODŚ candidates ran as part of it on behalf of the Electoral Committee of Rafał Dutkiewicz - they were Tadeusz Luty, Jerzy Makarczyk, Tomasz Misiak, Adam Myrda, Jarosław Obremski, Jerzy Zieliński and Patryk Wild. To the Polish Senate, as the only candidate affiliated with ODŚ, Jarosław Obremski was elected to the Independent Senators' Circle.

On 12 February 2014 ODŚ joined the ruling coalition in the Lower Silesian Voivodeship Sejmik (leaving only PiS in opposition). The former councillor for Wrocław, Jerzy Michalak, became Deputy Marshall of the Voivodship on behalf of the ODŚ.

At the 2014 Polish local elections Rafał Dutkiewicz entered into an agreement with the Civic Platform. In the local government elections, candidates associated with him (including himself) ran on the PO lists, while in the municipal elections in Wrocław the joint committee took the name ‘Rafał Dutkiewicz with Platform’ (winning a majority of seats in the city council). Rafał Dutkiewicz won the election for mayor of Wrocław in the second round. Wojciech Murdzek, who ran with the support of PO (from his own committee), lost the election for mayor of Świdnica in the second round. In the local council from the PO list (which won 16 seats), seats from among the ODŚ representatives were won by: Rafał Dutkiewicz (who did not take it, however, remaining mayor of Wrocław), Janusz Marszałek, Jerzy Michalak, Marek Obrębalski, Ewa Rzewuska and Paweł Wróblewski. The party's activities died down at that time, but it was not formally dissolved. Its activists continued their activities under other political labels and movements.

Dutkiewicz's decision to enter an agreement with PO was met with considerable disappointment in his party's ranks - Dutkiewicz did not officially met with his party members to discuss the issue, nor was any resolution passed to start talks with the PO. Many accused Dutkiewicz of hypocrisy and betraying the ideals of the party. Some of the activists of Citizens' Lower Silesia, who opposed Rafal Dutkiewicz's agreement with PO and the perceived right-wing shift, formed the 2014 Polish local elections committee Bezpartyjni Samorządowcy, which won 4 seats in the provincial assembly.

On 31 March 2016, the ODŚ councillors associated with Rafał Dutkiewicz (Janusz Marszałek, Jerzy Michalak, Marek Obrębalski, Ewa Rzewuska and the assembly chairman Paweł Wróblewski) left the Civic Platform club. In addition, other councillors of the party - Michał Bobowiec, vice-chairman of the local assembly Julian Golak, Czesław Kręcichwost, Ryszard Lech and voivodship Marshal Cezary Przybylski - left PO. Together with three councillors elected from BS lists (Tymoteusz Myrda, Patryk Wild and Ewa Zdrojewska), as well as another non-aligned councillor Kazimierz Janik (elected from the SLD list), they formed the club Bezpartyjni Samorządowcy, which became the largest club in the assembly and, in coalition with psl, took over power in the voivodeship, ousting PO from it. Tymoteusz Myrda replaced the party's representative as vice-marshal of the voivodeship. Patryk Wild became head of the club. Aldona Wiktorska-Święcka, elected from their list, did not join the new club.

On 27 June 2016 there was an expansion of the provincial governing coalition, joined by Civic Platform and the Democratic Left Alliance (having been in a joint councillors' club with the PSL for some time). Councillors elected from Bezpartyjni Samorządowcy lists (Tymoteusz Myrda, Patryk Wild and Ewa Zdrojewska, who was dismissed as vice-marshal of the voivodeship) then left their club and became non-aligned, soon forming the Club of Non-Partisan Councillors (in March 2017 this milieu co-founded the nationwide Local Government Movement ‘Bezpartyjni’).

=== Lower Silesian Local Government Movement ===
On 14 July 2016 the former councillors' club Bezpartyjni Samorządowcy (with 11 members) adopted the name Lower Silesian Local Government Movement (Polish: Dolnośląski Ruch Samorządowy, DRS), with Michal Bobowiec as its leader. The marshal of the voivodeship Cezary Przybylski, who belonged to the club, announced the start of DRS under this party in the local elections.

On 11 October of the same year, DRS activists set up an association (of a cross-party nature), registered 11 days later. Its president was Cezary Przybylski, vice-presidents Michał Bobowiec and Piotr Lech, secretary Piotr Koszarek and treasurer Irena Krzyszkiewicz. Other members of the board were Jakub Bronowicki, Dariusz Chmura, Rafał Gronicz and Roman Potocki. The chairman of the DRS programme council was Rafał Dutkiewicz. Other members of the association included Stanisław Huskowski, MP of the Union of European Democrats, former Mayor of Wrocław Piotr Kruczkowski, former Mayor of Wałbrzych Rafael Rokaszewicz, Mayor of Głogów from SLD Tomasz Smolarz, former MP and former Lower Silesian governor from Civic Platform Szymon Pacyniak, and the mayor Legnica from the SLD Tadeusz Krzakowski. In January 2017, the DRS had more than 120 members, including numerous mayors.

In October 2017, DRS announced the candidacy of Jerzy Michalak for mayor of Wrocław in the 2018 Polish local elections. However, he did not get the support of Rafał Dutkiewicz.

=== With Dutkiewicz for Lower Silesia ===
In June 2018, the assembly club of the Lower Silesian Local Government Movement association, having been expanded by the majority of the members of the Non-Partisan Councillors' Club, became the Bezpartyjni Samorządowcy club, which excluded Kazimierz Janik and Ryszard Lech. It became the largest club in the assembly, with Czesław Kręcichwost as its chairman. These activists ran in the 2018 Polish local elections under as Bezpartyjni Samorządowcy, while DRS activists associated with Rafał Dutkiewicz set up the committee With Dutkiewicz for Lower Silesia (Polish: Z Dutkiewiczem dla Dolnego Śląska) in August, running for the Lower Silesian Voivodeship Sejmik, as well as the Electoral Committee of Rafał Dutkiewicz - Alliance of Wrocław for the municipal council of Wrocław. The electoral lists of the With Dutkiewicz for Lower Silesia committee included MP Stanisław Huskowski of the Union of European Democrats, former local councilor Ryszard Lech, former Wałbrzych mayor Piotr Kruczkowski, and former professional athletes - boxer Maciej Zegan (former councillor of Wrocław), volleyball player Mariusz Dutkiewicz and basketball player Mirosław Łopatka. The Electoral Committee of Rafał Dutkiewicz - Alliance of Wrocław supported the Civic Coalition candidate in the mayoral election - Jacek Sutryk, who won the election in the first round. In addition to non-partisans, the electoral committee's lists included Democratic Left Alliance and Union of European Democrats activists.

In the voivodeship sejmik elections, the With Dutkiewicz for Lower Silesia committee received 8.29% of the vote (it was the 4th result) and two seats, which were won by Stanisław Huskowski and Ryszard Lech. They became non-aligned councillors and found themselves in opposition to the ruling PiS-Bezpartyjni Samorządowcy coalition. In the elections to the Wrocław council, the Electoral Committee of Rafał Dutkiewicz - Alliance of Wrocław came 3rd, receiving 14.21% of the vote and 7 seats. It established a 5-member club in the council - two councillors from his lists joined the Nowoczesna club, co-ruling the city. Three of the five councillors of the club were representatives of the Democratic Left Alliance In January 2021, the existing councillors of this club co-founded the club Jacek Sutryk Forum - Common Cause of Wrocław (Polish: Forum Jacka Sutryka – Wrocław Wspólna Sprawa), together with the Civic Platform and UP councillors, as well as former PiS councillors. The club gained an independent majority in the city council.

=== New Hope / New PL ===
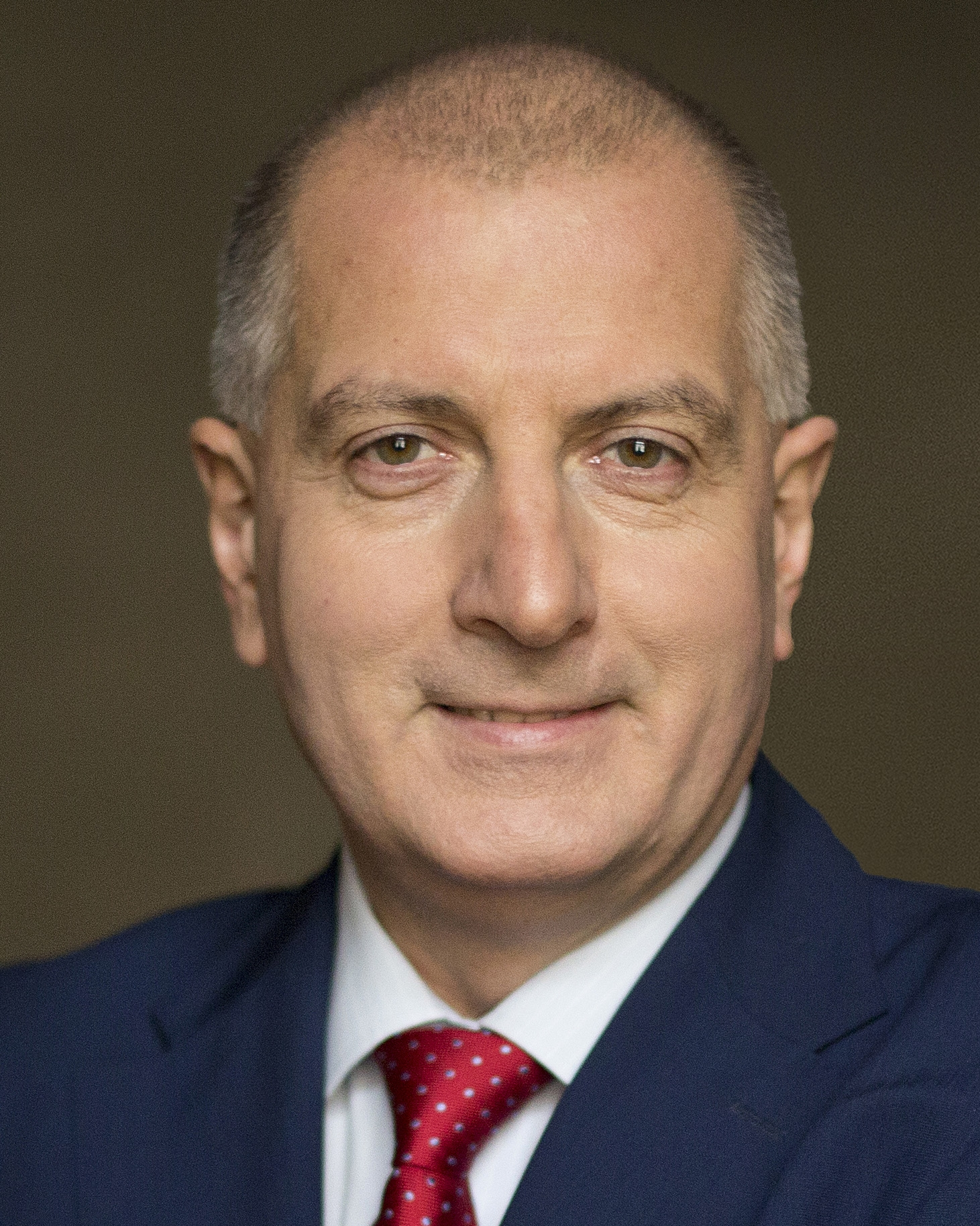
Leader of the party Rafał Dutkiewicz

On 10 March 2020 the association New Hope was registered, with Tadeusz Grabarek (board member of Nowoczesna, party vice-chairman until 2022) as chairman, and Piotr Lech (mayor of Milicz), Leon Susmanek (board member of the Union of European Democrats) and Piotr Uhle (chairman of the Nowoczesna club in the Wrocław council) as vice-chairmen. The board also included, among others, former provincial marshal Andrzej Łoś. The movement was inaugurated on 26 September of the same year. It then became headed by Rafał Dutkiewicz. Also associated with the formation were, among others, Nowoczesna MP Krzysztof Mieszkowski and councillor of Lower Silesia from the With Dutkiewicz for Lower Silesia list Stanisław Huskowski from the Union of European Democrats, who was a former mayor of Wrocław like Rafał Dutkiewicz. New Hope set up expert teams on health care and climate change. After a year, Tadeusz Grabarek became president of the association again, replacing Rafał Dutkiewicz.

On 29 January 2022 it was decided to establish New Hope councillor club in the Lower Silesian assembly and in the municipal councils of Wrocław and Świdnica. The club in the assembly (which is in opposition to the ruling PiS-Bezpartyjni Samorządowcy coalition) was formed as a result of the renaming of the Nowoczesna Plus club (consisting of three councillors from Nowoczesna, Stanisław Huskowski from the Union of European Democrats and Ryszard Lech).

In November 2022, following the name change of Janusz Korwin-Mikke's party to New Hope, the Lower Silesian association announced a lawsuit for the right to the name, accusing Korwin-Mikke's party of identity theft. On 12 April 2023, however, the Lower Silesian association adopted the new name New PL (its councillor clubs also did the same).

In the 2024 Polish local elections, New PL activists ran on behalf of Civic Coalition or the Third Way, to which the Union of European Democrats belongs. In the Lower Silesian Sejmik, seats were won by Magdalena Piasecka (who was the only one of the association's provincial councillors to be re-elected) and Dorota Galant (who was previously a councillor from Wrocław). Both of them, as representatives of Nowoczesna, obtained seats on behalf of KO and sat in its club. The activity of the association died down.

== Leadership ==
President:

- Rafał Dutkiewicz

Vice-presidents:

- Patryk Wild
- Paweł Wróblewski
- Jerzy Zieliński

Secretary:

- Tymoteusz Myrda

Treasurer:

- Andrzej Łoś

Other Board Member:

- Magdalena Sosna

== Election results ==
=== Regional assemblies ===
Election	%	Seats	+/–
2010	22.20% (Note: Party's vote share in the Lower Silesian Voivodeship.) (#5)	9 / 561	▲9
2014	26.29% (#2)	5 / 561	▼4
2014	As part of the Civic Platform.		
2018	8.29% (#5)	2 / 561	▼3
2024	30.59% (#2)	0 / 561	▼2
2024	As part of the Civic Coalition.		

=== Senate ===
Election	Seats	+/–
2011	1 / 100	▲1
2015	1 / 100	Steady
2019	0 / 100	▼1
2023	0 / 100	Steady

=== European Parliament ===
Election	Votes	%	Seats	+/–	EP Group
2014	Endorsed Poland Together				

== Ideology ==
The party describes itself as "the new centre-right" and seeks "the reconstruction of a centre-right capable of conducting a state policy which meets citizens' expectations and gives Poland a strong position in Europe". Leader of the party, Rafał Dutkiewicz, stressed that the Citizens of Lower Silesia is a "regional project" that wishes to exclusively deal with local issues of Lower Silesia. The priorities of the party are civic dialogue, modernisation of Lower Silesia, social and anti-poverty policies, and reinforcing the social integration and cohesion of the Lower Silesian people. Dutkiewicz spoke critically of both Law and Justice and Civic Platform, and stated that despite entering the agreement with the latter, he remains critical of the party's centralizing policies, lack of regional focus, and prioritizing European over domestic issues. At the same time, Dutkiewicz stated that the Citizens of Lower Silesia is aligned with Poland Together of Jarosław Gowin, and expressed his personal support for that party.

The party is also strongly supportive of decentralization of Poland, and mixes a generally conservative outlook with some progressive-leaning elements, such as focus on climate change and opposing the rhetoric of Law and Justice on the LGBT community. Dutkiewicz is also critical of PiS for its "expensive social promises" and argues that "with Law and Justice, we are back to the communist simpleton paradigm of development: Gomułka-Gierek"; he also accused PiS of being anti-European and xenophobic, and stated his mild preference for pro-Europeanism. Lastly, Dutkiewicz stressed the conservative outlook of his and his party, and was critical of the political party Spring, calling its program unrealistic.

== See also ==
- Bezpartyjni Samorządowcy
- Common Powiat
- Popular initiative
- First Self-Governance League
