= Sejm Constituency no. 1 =

Parliamentary constituency in Poland

Sejm Constituency no. 1 Legnica
- Okręg wyborczy nr 1 Legnica
- Constituency for the Sejm
- Location within Poland.
- Counties: Bolesławiec, Głogów, Jawor, Jelenia Góra, Kamienna Góra, Karkonosze, Legnica (city county), Legnica (land county), Lubań, Lubin, Lwówek, Polkowice, Zgorzelec, Złotoryja
- Voivodeship: Lower Silesian
- Population: 964,751 (June 2023)
- Electorate: 716,400 (2023)

Current constituency
- Created: 2001
- Deputies: 12
- Regional assembly: Lower Silesian Voivodeship Sejmik
- Senate constituencies: 1, 2 and 3
- EP constituency: Lower Silesian and Opole

Sejm Constituency no. 1 (Polish: Okręg wyborczy nr 1) is a constituency of the Sejm in Lower Silesian Voivodeship electing twelve deputies. It consists of city counties of Jelenia Góra and Legnica (constituency's seat) and land counties of Bolesławiec, Głogów, Jawor, Kamienna Góra, Karkonosze, Legnica, Lubań, Lubin, Lwówek, Polkowice, Zgorzelec and Złotoryja.

== List of deputies ==
Deputies for the 10th Sejm (2023–2027)
Deputy	Party
Piotr Borys	Civic Platform (Note: Member of the Civic Coalition parliamentary group.)
Zofia Czernow	Civic Platform
Łukasz Horbatowski	Civic Platform
Iwona Krawczyk	Civic Platform
Robert Kropiwnicki	Civic Platform
Krzysztof Kubów	Law and Justice
Marzena Machałek	Law and Justice
Szymon Pogoda	Law and Justice
Elżbieta Witek	Law and Justice
Wojciech Zubowski	Law and Justice
Tadeusz Samborski	Polish People's Party
Arkadiusz Sikora	New Left (Note: Member of The Left parliamentary group.)
