= With Dutkiewicz for Lower Silesia =

With Dutkiewicz for Lower Silesia Z Dutkiewiczem dla Dolnego Śląska
- Abbreviation: ZDdDŚ
- Leader: Rafał Dutkiewicz
- Founded: June 2018
- Headquarters: Wrocław, Poland
- Ideology: Regionalism; Liberalism
- Political position: Centre
- National affiliation: Citizens of Lower Silesia

With Dutkiewicz for Lower Silesia - a local election committee established for the local elections in Poland in 2018 in the Lower Silesian Voivodeship. The leader of the committee is Rafał Dutkiewicz, former president of Wrocław.

In the 2018 elections to the Lower Silesian Regional Assembly, the ZDdDŚ committee received 8.29% of votes (4th place) and two mandates, which were obtained by Stanisław Huskowski and Ryszard Lech. They became non-attached councilors and found themselves in opposition to the ruling coalition of PiS and BS. In the elections to the Wrocław city council, the committee took third place, receiving 14.21% of votes and 7 seats.
