= Wojciech Zubowski =

Polish politician (born 1979)

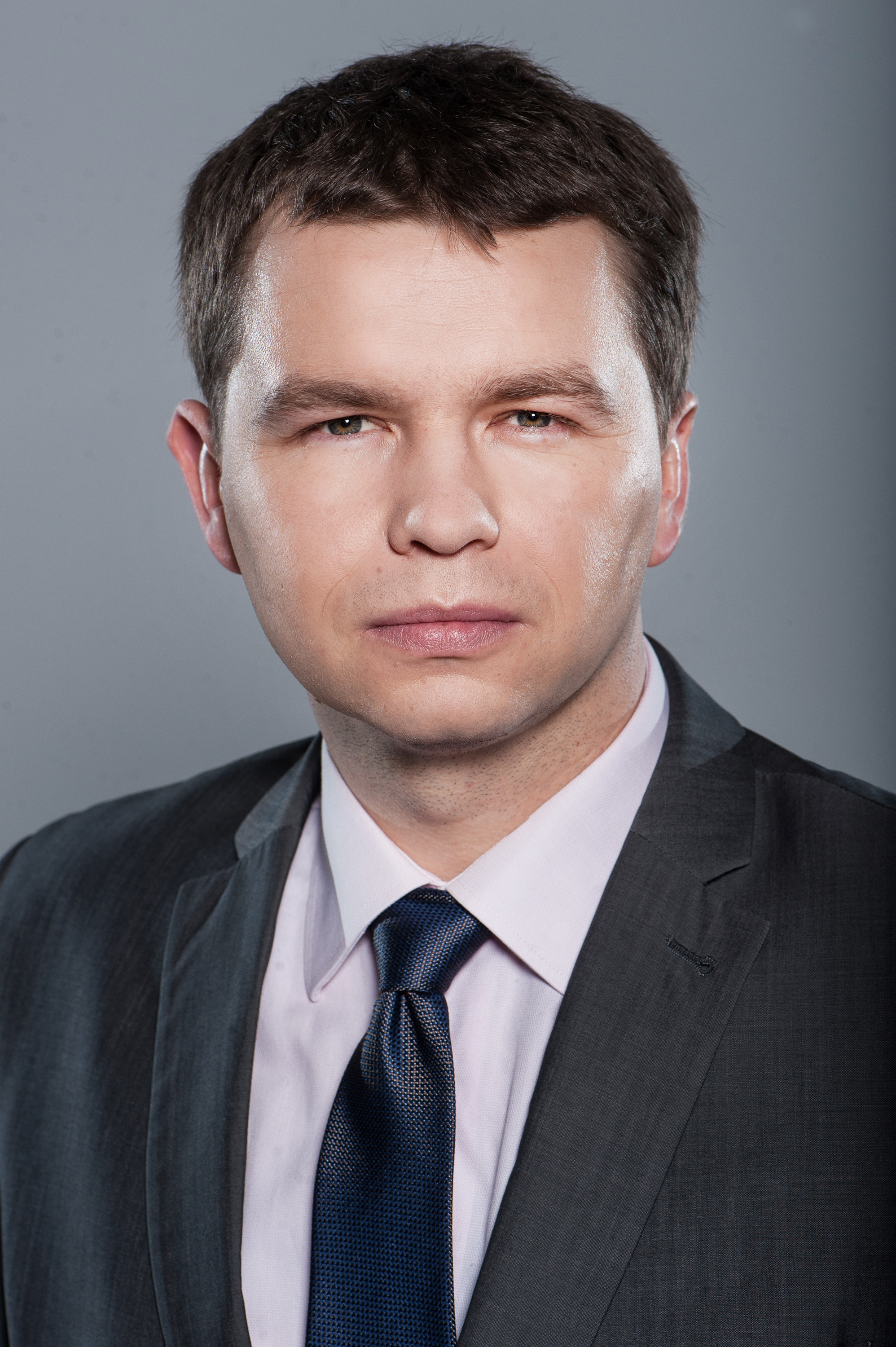

Member of the Sejm

Personal details
- Born: 12 November 1979 (age 46) Wrocław, Poland
- Party: Law and Justice
- Education: University of Wrocław (BA); Warsaw Management University (MBA)
- Occupation: Entrepreneur, local government official, politician

Wojciech Zubowski (born 12 November 1979) is a Polish politician. He has been a member of the Sejm since 2011 representing the constituency of Legnica. He was re-elected in 2015. In 2019, he was again elected to the Sejm (9th term). He is affiliated with the Law and Justice party.

He was born in Wrocław, Poland.
