= Krzysztof Kubów =

Polish politician

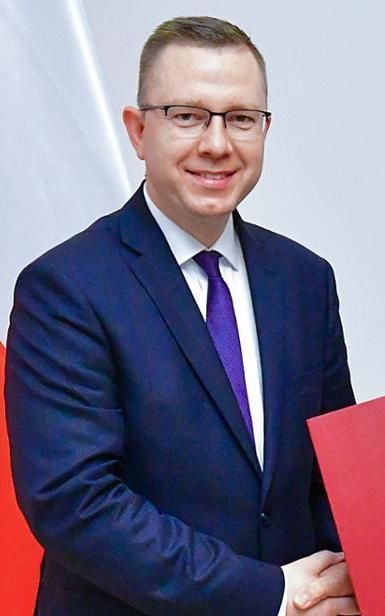

Member of the Sejm
- Incumbent
- Assumed office 12 November 2015

Personal details
- Born: 22 July 1984 (age 41) Lubin, Poland
- Party: Law and Justice

Krzysztof Kubów is a Polish politician. Kubów is a Law and Justice Member of the Sejm for Legnica.
