= Jacek Sutryk =

Polish politician and sociologist

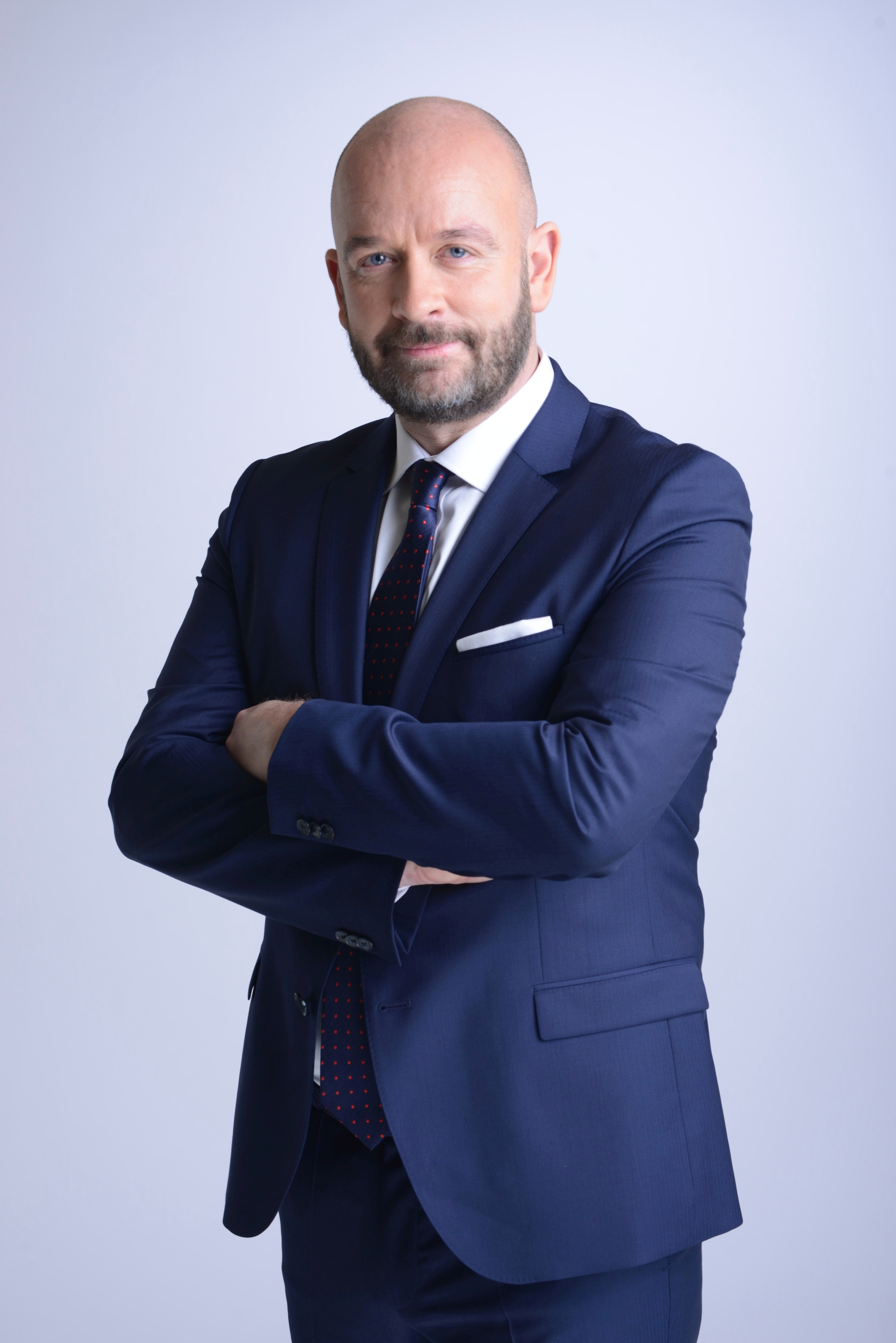
- Official portrait

Mayor of Wrocław
- Incumbent
- Assumed office 19 November 2018
- Deputy: Jakub Mazur; Bartłomiej Ciążyński; Sebastian Lorenc
- Preceded by: Rafał Dutkiewicz

Personal details
- Born: 17 September 1978 (age 47) Wrocław, Poland
- Party: Independent (supported by Civic Platform and New Left)
- Other political affiliations: Yes! For Poland
- Profession: politician, sociologist

Jacek Zbigniew Sutryk (born 17 September 1978, in Wrocław) is a Polish politician and sociologist. He currently serves as the mayor of the city of Wrocław, Lower Silesian Voivodeship, Poland. In June 2024 he was elected chairman of the Association of Polish Cities.

== Life and career ==
He was born on 17 September 1978 in Wrocław. He attended the Wincenty Pol Primary School No.9 and the Social General Secondary School No.1 in Wrocław. He also graduated in sociology from the Faculty of Social Sciences of the University of Wrocław. After completing his studies, he assumed the post of director of the Warsaw-based WRZOS Association, a non-governmental organization established to represent interests of individuals and groups of people who are socially marginalized and who are facing the threat of exclusion from society. He also worked at the Collegium of Socio-Economics of the Warsaw School of Economics as well as the Janusz Korczak Pedagogical University in Warsaw.

Since 2007, he worked at the Wrocław city council and was in charge of the city's social service policy. In November 2011, he assumed the position of director at the Social Affairs Department of the City of Wrocław, which he held for seven years. He supervised the city's cultural institutions, sports and recreation centres, as well as medical and social service facilities.

In the 2018 Polish local elections, he stood for office of Mayor of Wrocław representing the Civic Coalition formed between the Civic Platform and Modern political parties. He also received official support of the then-mayor Rafał Dutkiewicz as well as the Democratic Left Alliance and the Union of European Democrats. In the first round of the elections, he received 129,669 votes (50.2%) thus beating the Law and Justice candidate Mirosława Stachowiak-Różecka who gained 71,049 votes (27.5%). On 19 November 2018, he was officially sworn in as Mayor of Wrocław.

== See also ==
- Politics of Poland
- Local elections in Poland
