= Stanisław Huskowski =

Polish politician (born 1953)

Stanisław Tadeusz Huskowski
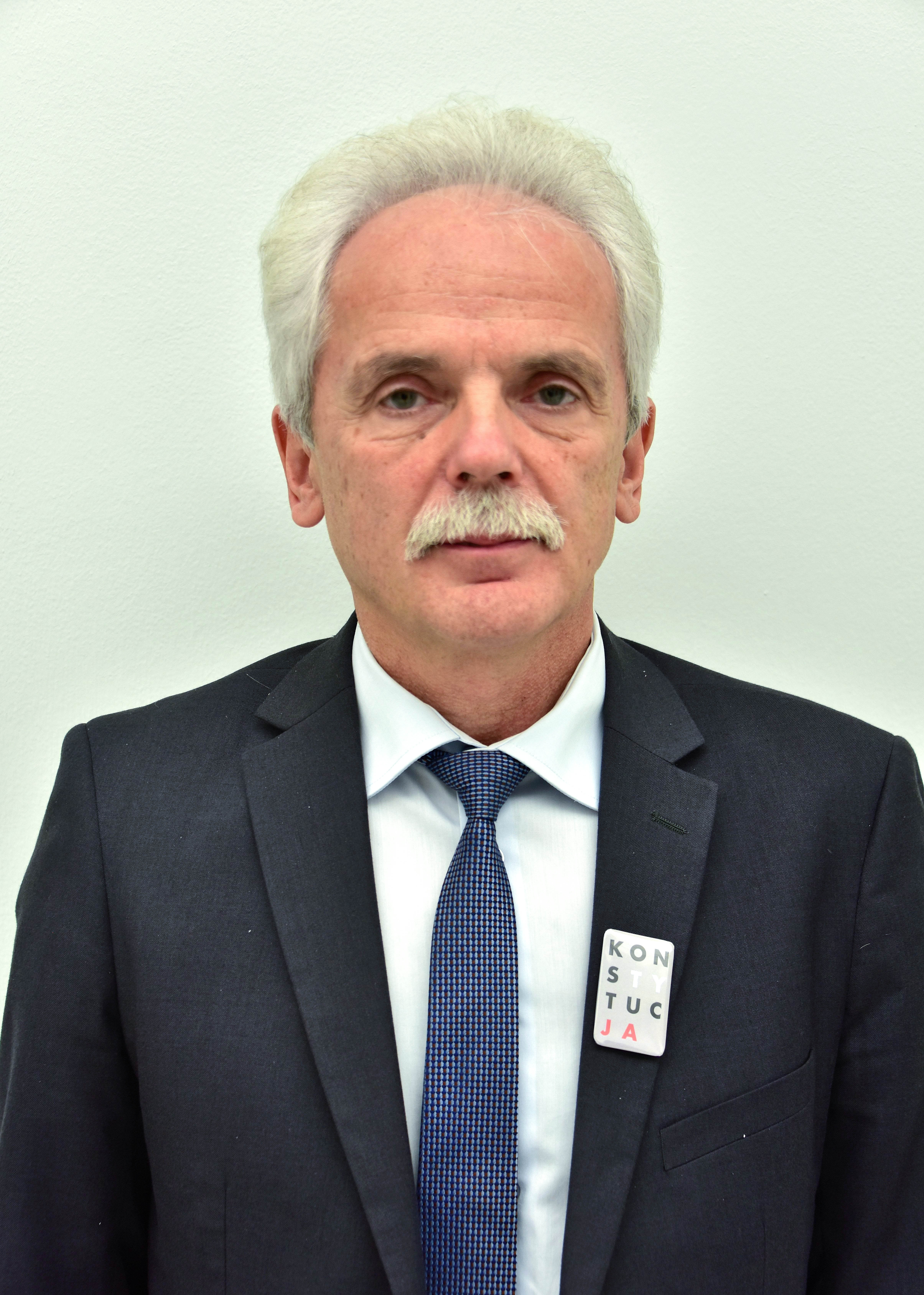

City mayor of Wrocław
- In office 8 May 2001 – 19 November 2002
- Preceded by: Bogdan Zdrojewski
- Succeeded by: Rafał Dutkiewicz

Member of the Sejm
- In office 19 October 2005 – 2018
- Constituency: 3 – Wrocław

Personal details
- Born: 24 April 1953 (age 72) Wrocław, Poland
- Party: Civic Platform

Stanisław Tadeusz Huskowski (born 24 April 1953 in Wrocław) is a Polish politician. He was elected to Sejm on 25 September 2005, getting 12,334 votes in 3 Wrocław district as a candidate from the Civic Platform list.

He was also a member of Senate 2001-2005.

== See also ==
- Members of Polish Sejm 2005-2007
