= 2010 Polish local elections =

Elections in Poland

2010 Polish regional assembly election
| ← 2006 | 21 November 2010 (first round); 5 December 2010 (second round) | 2014 → |

561 seats to regional assemblies
- Registered: 30,608,506
- Turnout: 14,494,179 (47.35%) ▲1.44pp
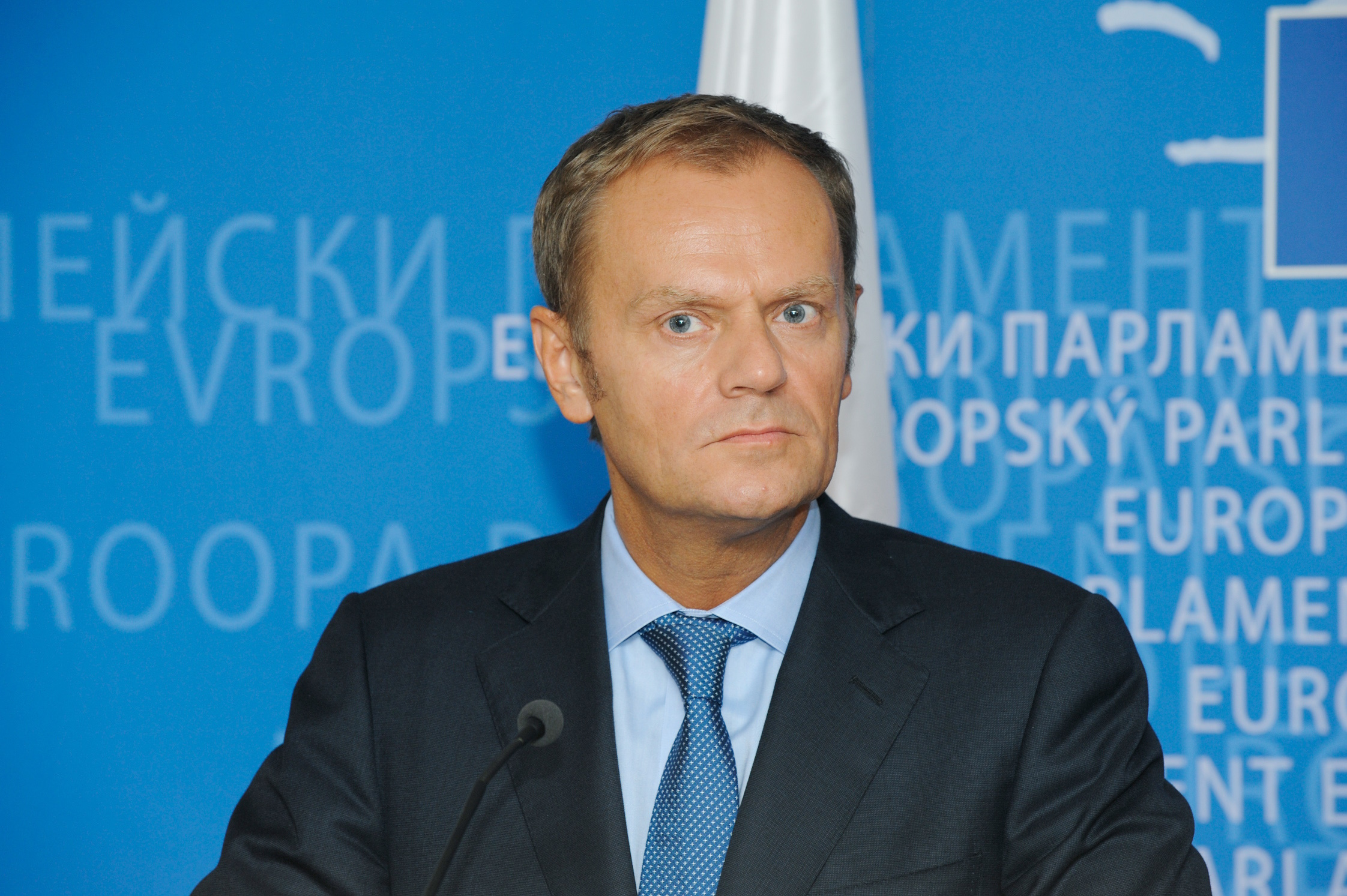

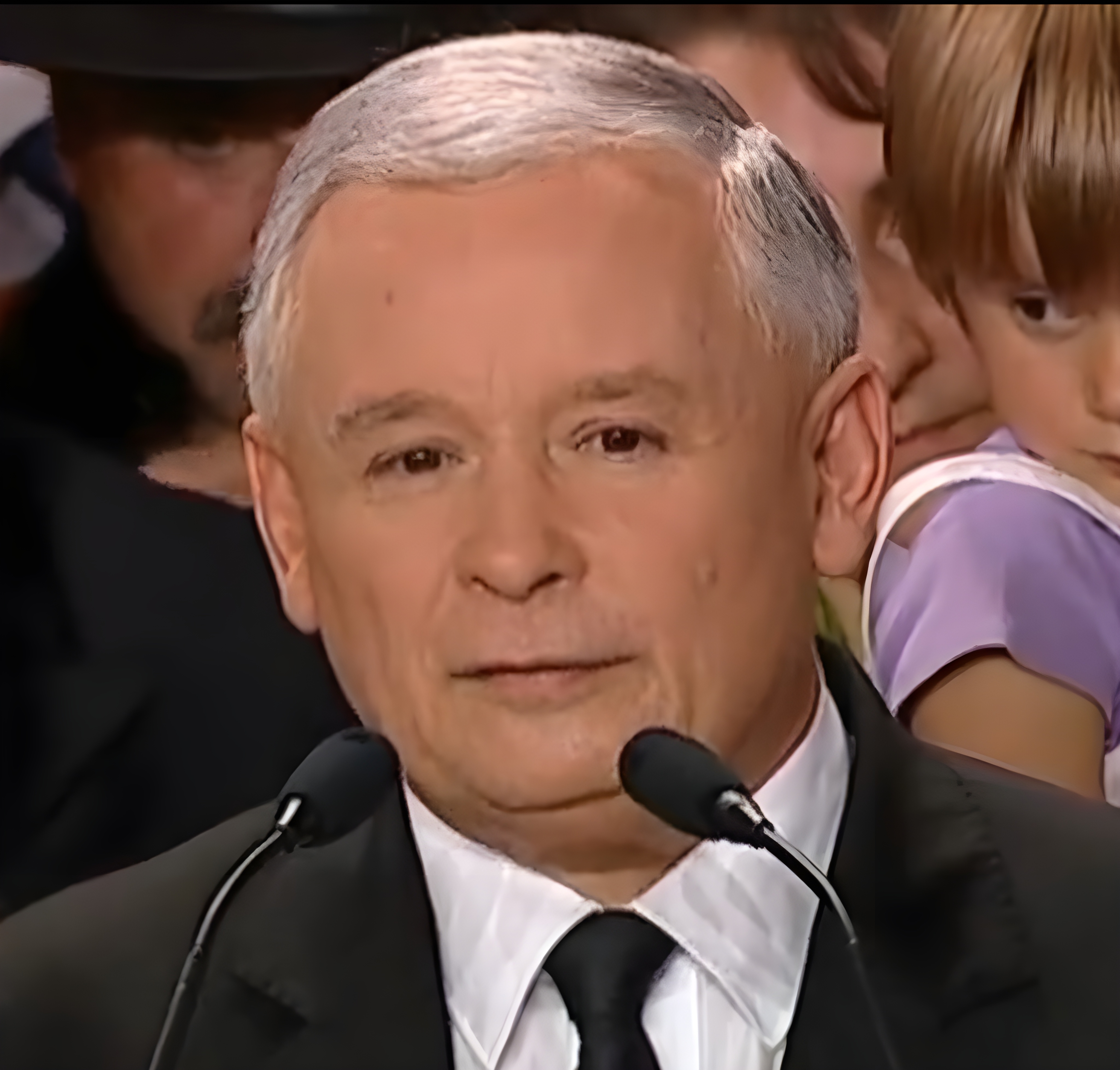

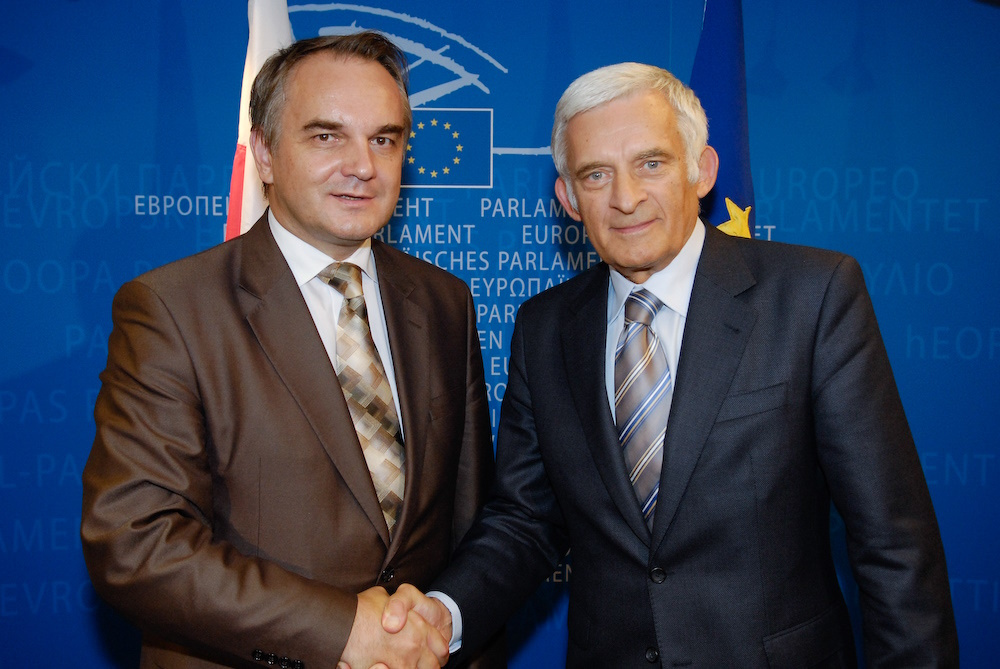

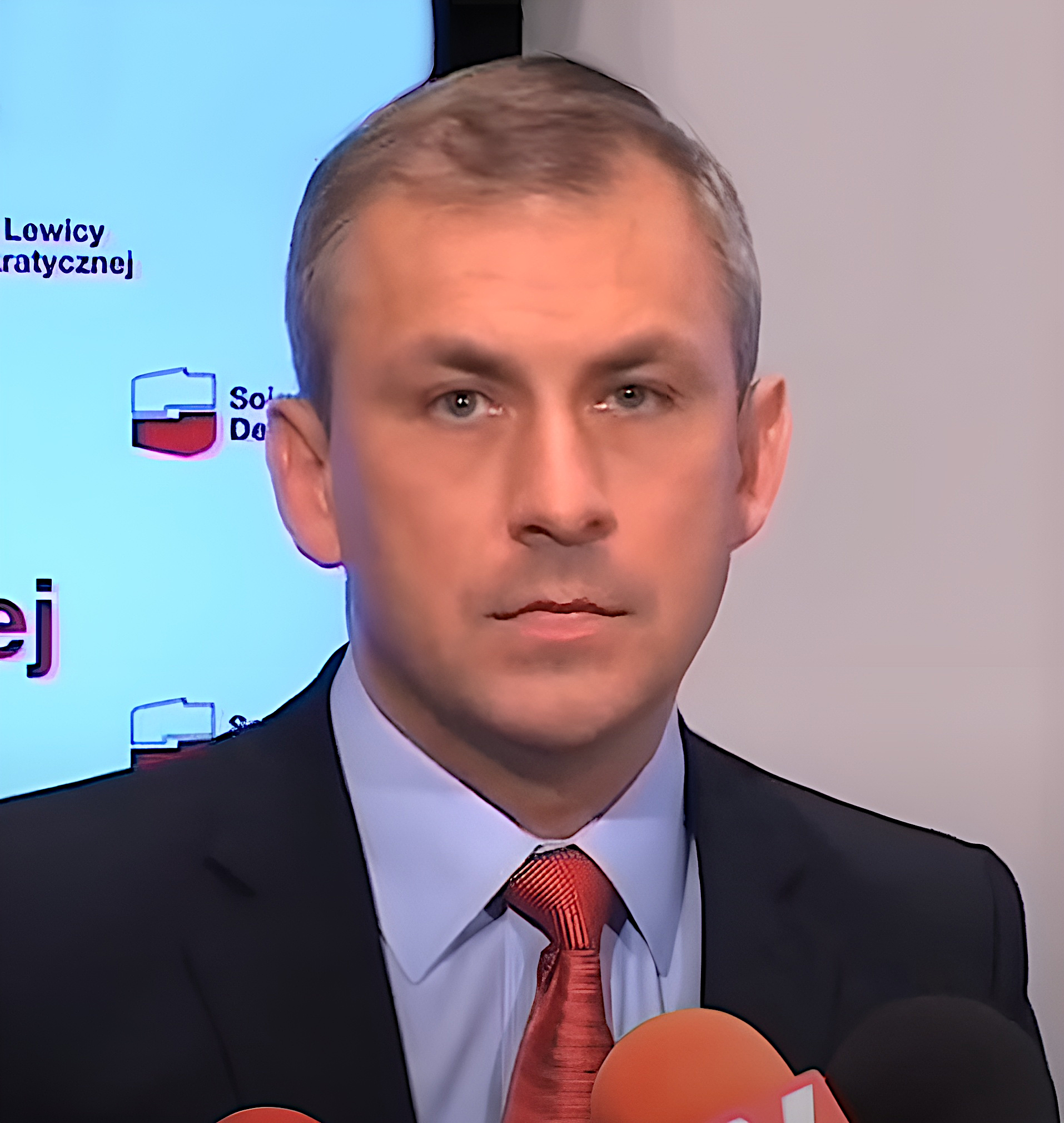

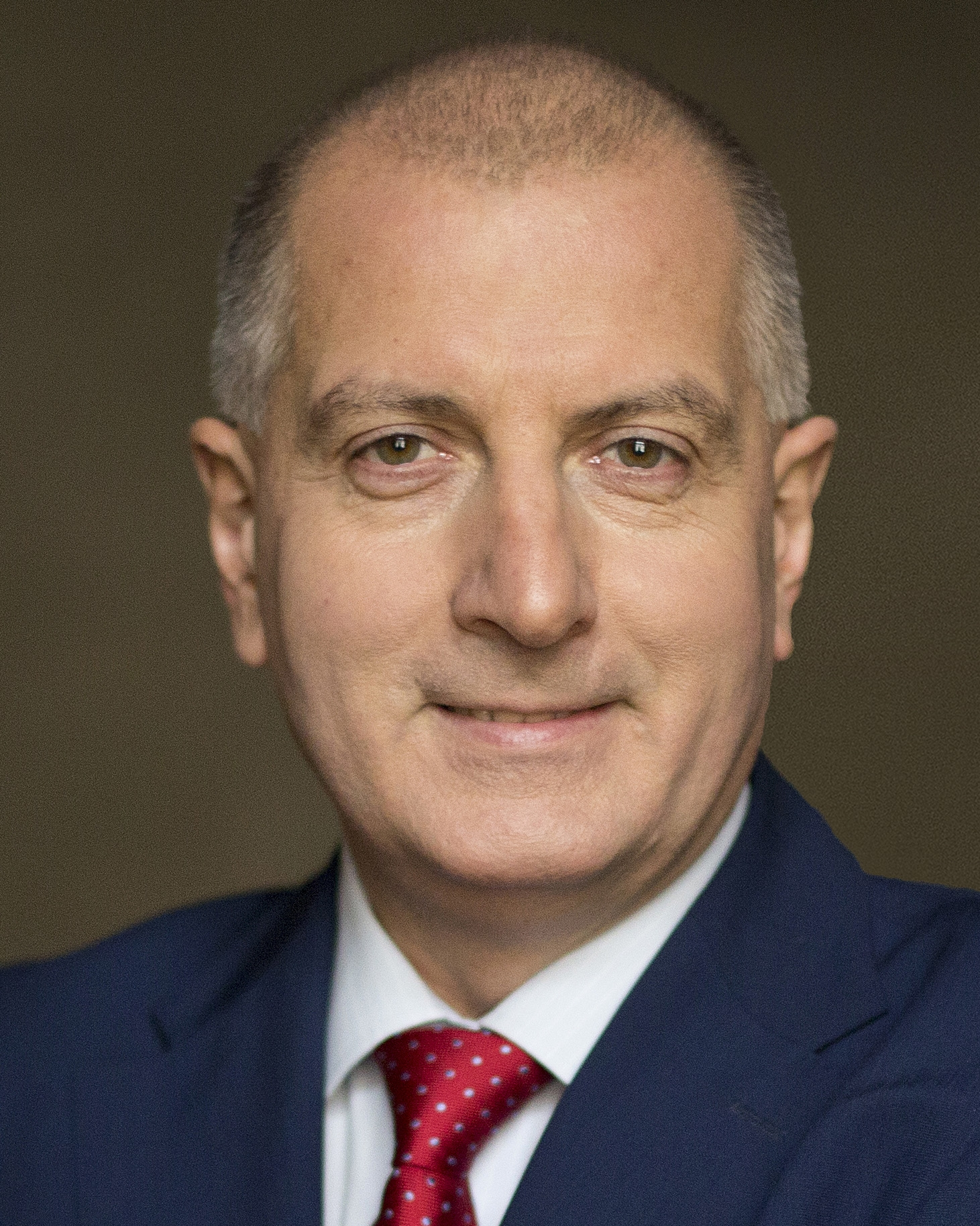

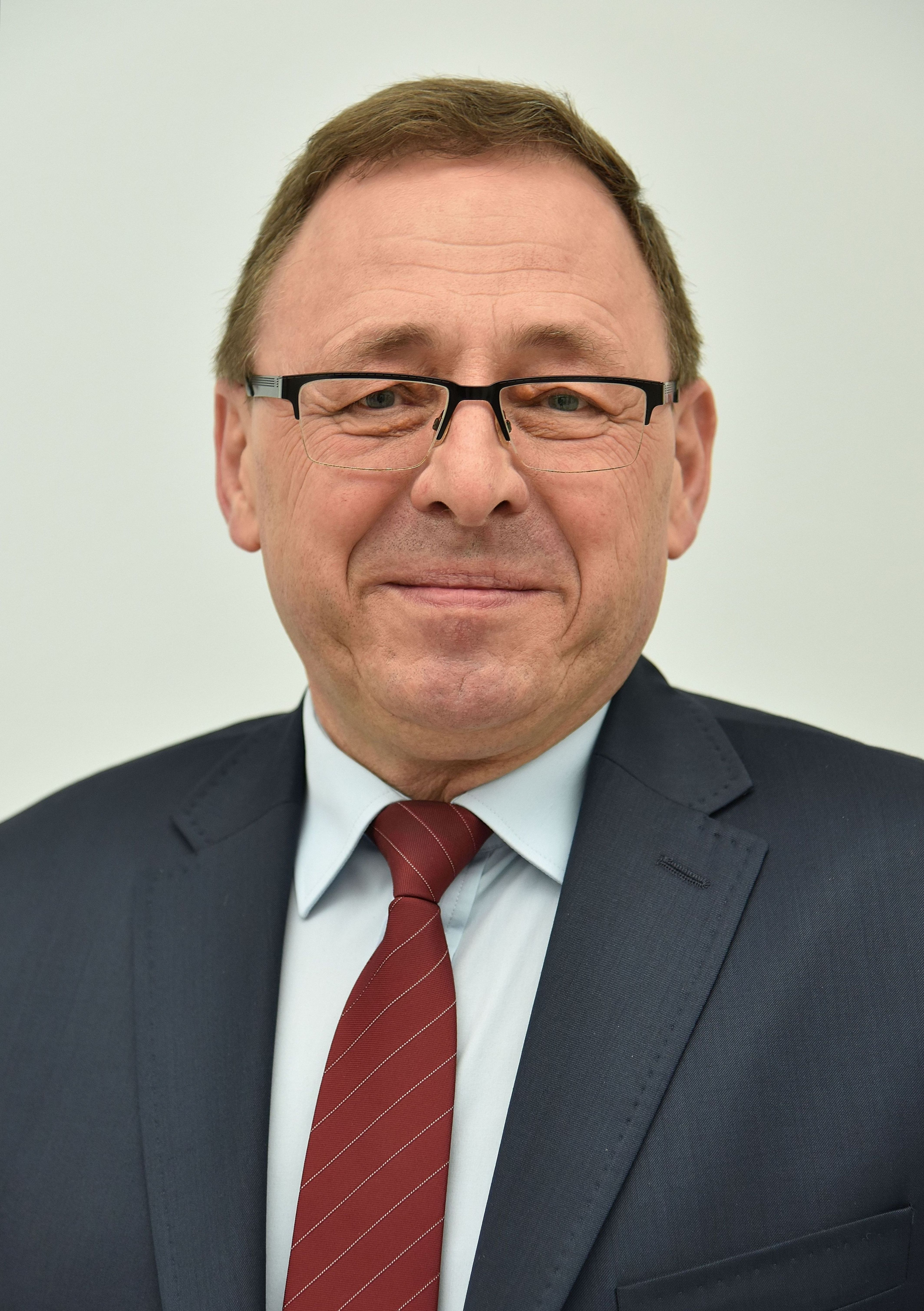
| | First party | Second party | Third party |
|---|---|---|---|
| Leader | Donald Tusk | Jarosław Kaczyński | Waldemar Pawlak |
| Party | PO | PiS | PSL |
| Leader since | 1 June 2003 | 18 January 2003 | 29 January 2005 |
| Last election | 27.1%, 186 seats | 25.0%, 170 seats | 13.2%, 83 seats |
| Seats won | 222 | 141 | 93 |
| Seat change | ▲36 | ▼29 | ▲10 |
| Popular vote | 3,930,210 | 2,931,867 | 2,073,234 |
| Percentage | 30.9% | 23.1% | 16.3% |
| Swing | ▲3.8pp | ▼1.9pp | ▲3.1pp |
| | Fourth party | Fifth party | Sixth party |
| Leader | Grzegorz Napieralski | Rafał Dutkiewicz | Ryszard Galla |
| Party | SLD | ODŚ | MN |
| Leader since | 31 May 2008 | 26 January 2008 | 25 September 2005 |
| Last election | 14.2%, 66 seats | Did not exist | 0.4%, 7 seats |
| Seats won | 85 | 9 | 6 |
| Seat change | ▲19 | Did not exist | ▼1 |
| Popular vote | 1,933,913 | 208,867 | 53,670 |
| Percentage | 15.2% | 1.6% | 0.4% |
| Swing | ▲1.0pp | Did not exist | 0.0pp |
- Result of the voivodeship sejmik elections

The 2010 Polish local elections were held in two parts, with its first round on 21 November and the second on 5 December. The first round included elections of deputies to provincial voivodeship sejmiks, as well for gmina and powiat councilors. The second round of elections were marked for mayors, borough leaders, and other positions decided by runoff elections. The local elections were seen as a test to the ruling Civic Platform and Polish People's Party coalition government under Prime Minister Donald Tusk.

== Background ==
As the first polls since the July presidential elections, which saw Civic Platform candidate Bronisław Komorowski defeat Law and Justice MP and former Prime Minister Jarosław Kaczyński, the 2010 local elections were characterized as a test to the administration of Donald Tusk. In the weeks prior to the elections, polls conducted by the CBOS Institute showed the ruling Civic Platform party with a comfortable lead over its rivals. The opposition Law and Justice electoral campaign faced multiple challenges prior to the elections. Polls published in the days leading up to the first round indicated low support for the party. In a related addition, a severe internal party crisis regarding Kaczyński's leadership and the party's ideological direction, simmering among several of the party's more moderate MPs in the Sejm for several months prior, exploded into the open days before the election. The rebel MPs, led by expelled party member Joanna Kluzik-Rostkowska, formed the Poland Comes First parliamentary group on 16 November. The party split further undermined confidence to the government's opposition.

Due to mandates in Polish law, all electioneering, poll surveys, and campaigning ceased on 20 November, in the period known as the "election silence."

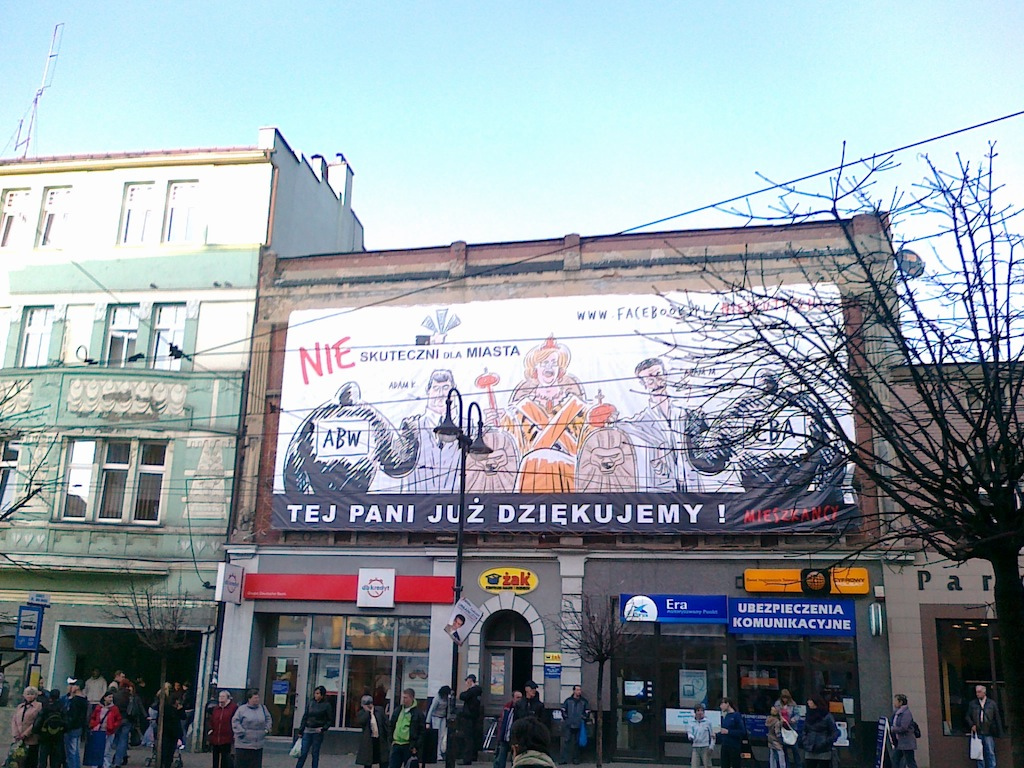
A partisan municipal election poster in Zabrze.

== Results ==
=== Analysis ===
Following the tabulated results of the election's first round, Civic Platform emerged with a victory, increasing its profile across provincial, county, and municipal councils. In voivodeship sejmiks, Civic Platform won control of 12 voivodeships, and tied for first place in another. The party's national junior coalition partner, the Polish People's Party, won outright in Świętokrzyskie Voivodeship. Law and Justice received a majority in two voivodeships. Following the results, Prime Minister Tusk and Deputy Prime Minister Waldemar Pawlak agreed to extend their coalition into local administrations. Civic Platform performed well in county powiat councils, and also significantly raised its electoral profile in municipal gmina councils.

The Polish People's Party also emerged as a winner following the elections, capturing a strong 16 percent of the vote, exceeding previous expectations from pre-election polling. In powiat councils, the party particularly increased its share thanks to its strong connections to local politics. In gmina elections, the party expanded gains from the previous 2006 local elections.

Law and Justice suffered defeats in all voivodeship, powiat and gmina council tiers of government. While the defeat did not signify a total collapse as survey polls previously suggested, the results pointed towards a general trend of decline for the rightist party, with critics pointing to the perceived aloofness of its party leader, Jarosław Kaczyński.

The center-left Democratic Left Alliance also benefited during the elections. Although pushed to fourth place by the surprising gains of the Polish People's Party, the Democratic Left Alliance increased their numbers in provincial voivodeship sejmiks and powiat councils, though the party suffered losses in gmina council elections.

While Civic Platform achieved considerable success in the outright reelection of Hanna Gronkiewicz-Waltz as Mayor of Warsaw without a second round, the electorate continued to lean for nonpartisan independent mayors. Independent candidates led in over half of the country's 18 largest cities against mainstream party candidates. Civic Platform's attempts to unseat independent mayors in Kraków, Katowice, Poznań, Toruń and Wrocław all ended in defeat.

In the county and municipal levels, independent candidates and local political committees captured the most votes, retaining 38 percent of all county councilor seats and over 71 percent of all municipal councilor seats.

=== Turnout ===
The turnout in the first round was 47.32%, and in the second round - 35.31%.

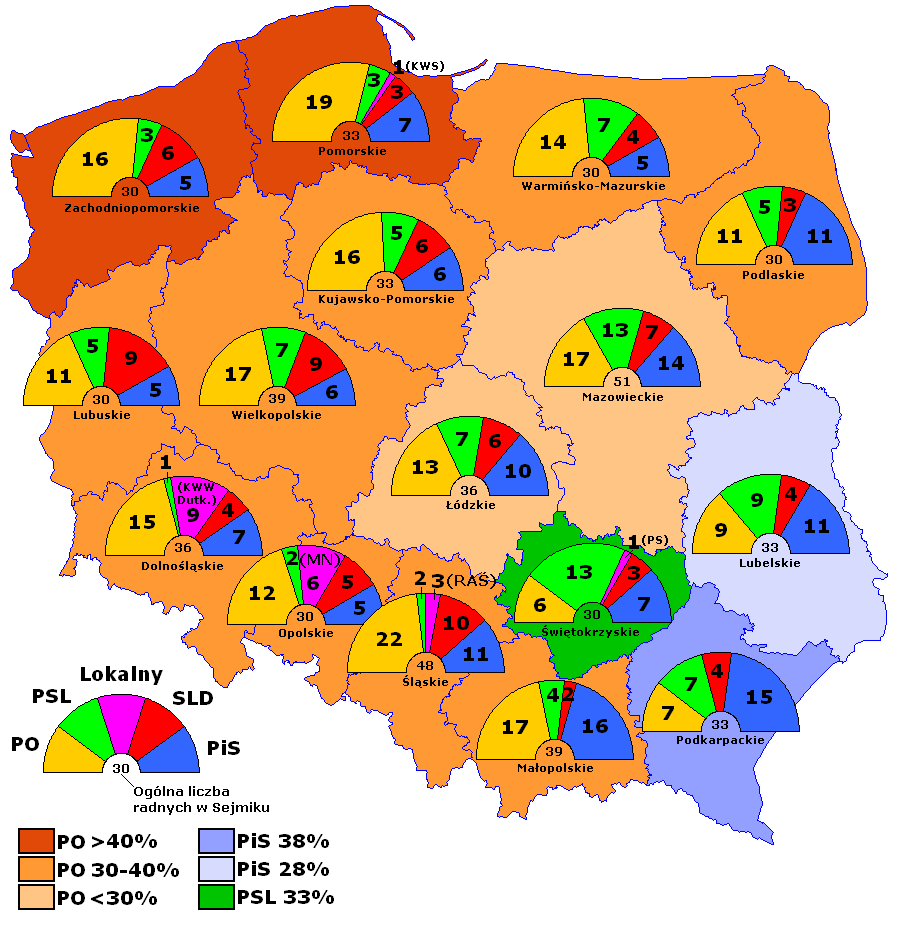
Provincial voivodeship sejmik results by party

=== Voivodeship councils ===
| Electoral committee | % of seats | Seats | ▲ / ▼ |
|---|---|---|---|
| Civic Platform (PO) | 39.57% | 222 | ▲36 |
| Law and Justice (PiS) | 25.13% | 141 | ▼29 |
| Polish People's Party (PSL) | 16.68% | 93 | ▲10 |
| Democratic Left Alliance (SLD) | 15.15% | 85 | ▲9 |
| Citizens of Lower Silesia (ODŚ) | 1.60% | 9 | ▲3 |
| German Minority (MN) | 0.89% | 6 | ▼1 |
| Silesian Autonomy Movement (RAŚ) | 0.53% | 3 | ▲3 |
| Regional committees | 0.36% | 2 | ▲1 |
| Self-Defense of the Republic of Poland (SRP) | -- | 0 | ▼37 |
| League of Polish Families (LPR) | -- | 0 | ▼11 |
| Total | 100.00% | 561 | |

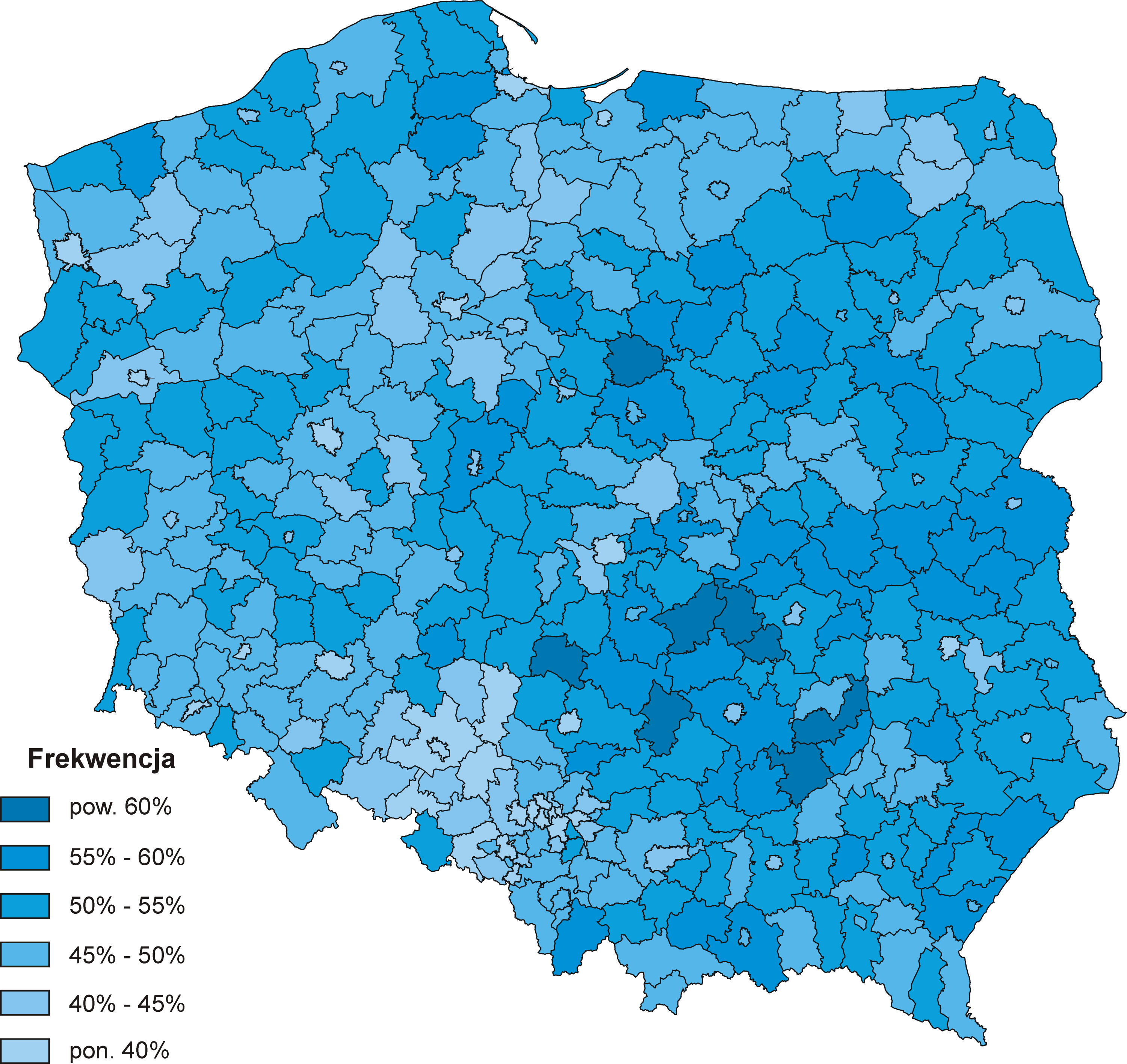
Election turnout by county (powiat).

| Party | Votes | % | Seats |
|---|---|---|---|
| Civic Platform | 3,930,210 | 30.89 | 222 |
| Law and Justice | 2,931,867 | 23.05 | 141 |
| Polish People's Party | 2,073,234 | 16.30 | 93 |
| Democratic Left Alliance | 1,933,913 | 15.20 | 85 |
| National Party of Retirees and Pensioners | 231,263 | 1.82 | 0 |
| Rafał Dutkiewicz's Electors' Electoral Committee | 208,867 | 1.64 | 9 |
| Janusz Korwin-Mikke Electors' Electoral Committee | 155,210 | 1.22 | 0 |
| Polish Labour Party - August | 149,482 | 1.18 | 0 |
| Our Home Poland - Andrzej Lepper's Self-Defence | 133,284 | 1.05 | 0 |
| Silesian Autonomy Movement | 122,781 | 0.97 | 3 |
| Left-wing Electoral Committee (Note: Polish Left, Social Democracy of Poland, Union of the Left of the Third Republic) | 91,196 | 0.72 | 0 |
| National Self-Governance Community | 90,650 | 0.71 | 1 |
| League of Polish Families | 87,545 | 0.69 | 0 |
| Right Wing of the Republic | 78,287 | 0.62 | 0 |
| Małopolska Community of Marek Nawara | 68,600 | 0.54 | 0 |
| Real Politics Union | 56,347 | 0.44 | 0 |
| German Minority Electoral Committee | 53,670 | 0.42 | 6 |
| Self-Governance Agreement | 47,303 | 0.37 | 1 |
| Electoral Platform | 31,710 | 0.25 | 0 |
| National Revival of Poland | 30,776 | 0.24 | 0 |
| Piast Faction | 29,939 | 0.24 | 0 |
| Konstanty Dombrowicz Electoral Committee. City for the Generations | 27,603 | 0.22 | 0 |
| Independent Platform of Social Initiatives-Now Wielkopolska | 26,914 | 0.21 | 0 |
| Firemens' Electoral Committee | 16,092 | 0.13 | 0 |
| Polish Direction | 15,432 | 0.12 | 0 |
| Alliance of the Polish Nation | 12,959 | 0.10 | 0 |
| Right-wing Self-Governance Community | 11,304 | 0.09 | 0 |
| Youth as Gurantors of Change | 9,642 | 0.08 | 0 |
| Justice in Kraków | 8,796 | 0.07 | 0 |
| National Breakthrough Movement | 8,044 | 0.06 | 0 |
| Śląsk Wrocław | 7,127 | 0.06 | 0 |
| Patriotic Poland | 6,955 | 0.05 | 0 |
| Our Gmina Our Powiat - It's Us | 5,864 | 0.05 | 0 |
| Slavic Union | 5,707 | 0.04 | 0 |
| Civic Initiative of Powiat Tarnogórski | 4,764 | 0.04 | 0 |
| Human Rights Defence Electoral Committee | 3,972 | 0.03 | 0 |
| Solidary Gdańsk | 2,952 | 0.02 | 0 |
| Ekopark | 2,130 | 0.02 | 0 |
| Independent Social Movement Western Pomeranian | 1,579 | 0.01 | 0 |
| Zdzisław Kaniewski Electors' Electoral Committee | 1,243 | 0.01 | 0 |
| Thinking Differently | 979 | 0.01 | 0 |
| Agreement of the Right in Głubczyce | 866 | 0.01 | 0 |
| Center for Sustainable Development | 844 | 0.01 | 0 |
| Care for Greenery | 769 | 0.01 | 0 |
| Loża Szyderców Electors' Electoral Committee | 767 | 0.01 | 0 |
| Social Movement | 722 | 0.01 | 0 |
| Centro-Behaviorist-Socialist Agreement | 680 | 0.01 | 0 |
| skuteczniedoprzodu.pl Electoral Committee | 536 | 0.00 | 0 |
| Total | 12,721,376 | 100.00 | 561 |
| Valid votes | 12,721,376 | 87.77 | |
| Invalid/blank votes | 1,772,803 | 12.23 | |
| Total votes | 14,494,179 | 100.00 | |
| Registered voters/turnout | 30,608,506 | 47.35 | |
Source: National Electoral Commission

=== County councils ===
| Electoral committee | % of seats | Seats | ▲ / ▼ |
|---|---|---|---|
| Local committees | 38.12% | 2,398 | ▼249 |
| Civic Platform (PO) | 20.91% | 1,315 | ▲536 |
| Law and Justice (PiS) | 17,25% | 1,085 | ▼146 |
| Polish People's Party (PSL) | 15,88% | 999 | ▲132 |
| Democratic Left Alliance (SLD) | 7.84% | 493 | ▲25 |
| Total | 100.00% | 6,290 | |

=== Municipal councils ===
| Electoral committee | % of seats | Seats | ▲ / ▼ |
|---|---|---|---|
| Local committees | 71.5% | 28,480 | ▼246 |
| Polish People's Party (PSL) | 11% | 4,381 | ▲483 |
| Law and Justice (PiS) | 7% | 2,782 | ▼194 |
| Civic Platform (PO) | 6.82% | 2,719 | ▲1,122 |
| Democratic Left Alliance (SLD) | 3.68% | 1,466 | ▼130 |
| Total | 100.00% | 39,828 | |
