= Rafał Dutkiewicz =

Polish politician

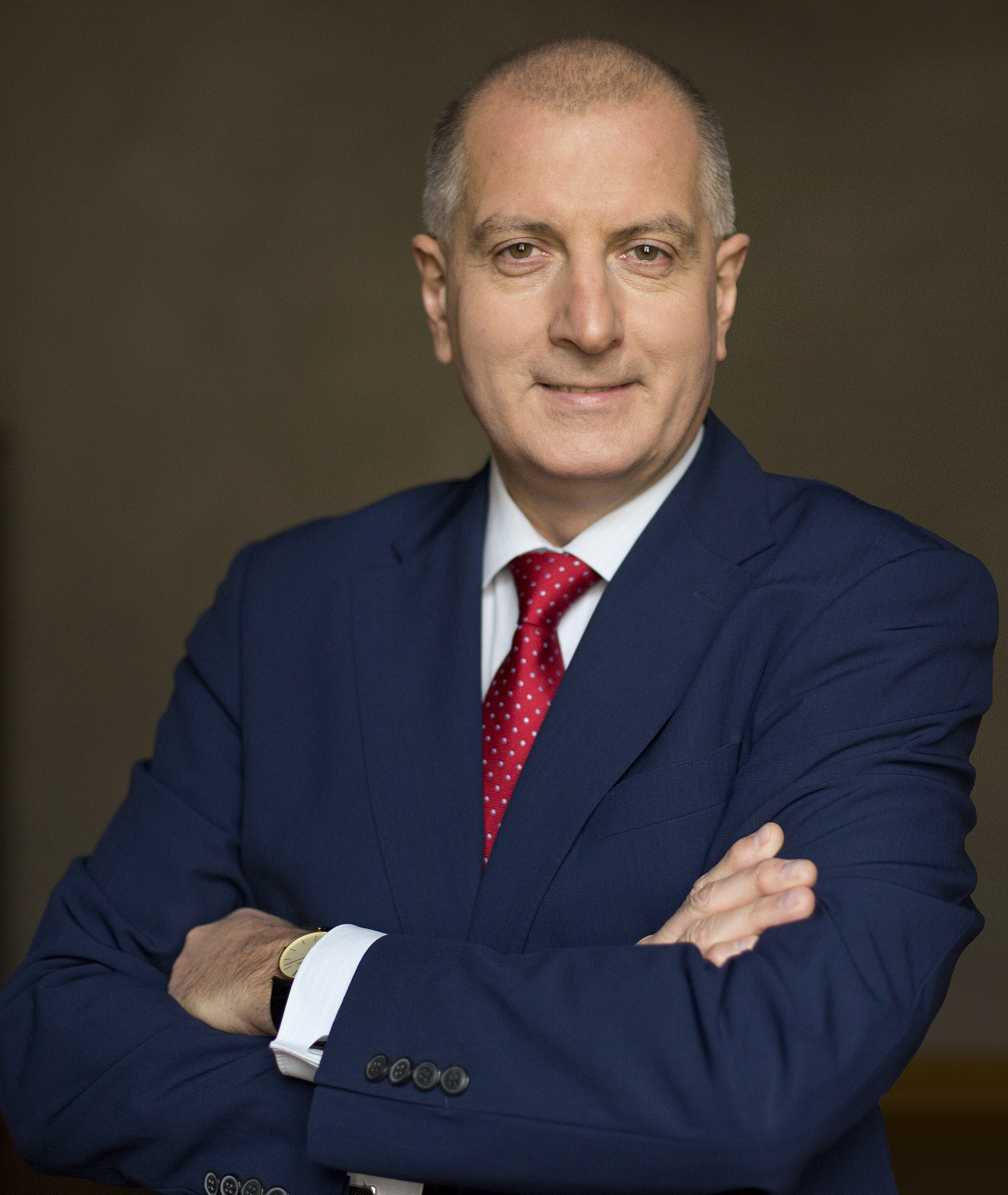

City mayor of Wrocław
- In office 19 November 2002 – 19 November 2018
- Vice President: Wojciech Adamski, Maciej Bluj, Adam Grehl, Dawid Jackiewicz, Michał Janicki, Sławomir Najnigier, Jarosław Obremski, Magdalena Piasecka, Anna Szarycz
- Preceded by: Stanisław Huskowski
- Succeeded by: Jacek Sutryk

Personal details
- Born: 6 July 1959 (age 67) Mikstat, Poland
- Party: Independent
- Spouse: Anna Dutkiewicz
- Children: Justyna, Joachim
- Profession: Politician, entrepreneur

Rafał Dutkiewicz (born 6 July 1959, Mikstat) is a Polish politician and entrepreneur who served as the city mayor of Wrocław, Lower Silesian Voivodeship, Poland from 2002 to 2018.

== Career till 2002 ==
In the late 1970s and early 1980s he engaged in the organisation of the Christian Culture Weeks in Wrocław and held the chair of the Adam Mickiewicz Scholarship Association. He was also actively involved in the Scouts movement as a member of ZHP (The Polish Scouting Association) General Council.

In 1982 he earned the Master of Science degree in applied mathematics from the Faculty of Fundamental Problems of Technology at the Wrocław University of Technology. He also studied at the Department of Christian Philosophy of the Catholic University of Lublin, and in 1985 obtained his doctoral degree in formal logic ("Research on the Beth semantic tableaux method") under the supervision of Professor Ludwik Borkowski.

During the martial law in Poland, he was a member of the underground structures of NSZZ Solidarność in Wrocław. In 1989 he was appointed secretary of the Civic Committee (Komitet Obywatelski) and in 1990 elected its chairman.

He worked as a research assistant at the Catholic University of Lublin (1982-1992), Wrocław University (1989-1994) and a fellow of the Katolischer Akademischer Ausländer-Dienst in Freiburg (1990-1991).

In the 1990s he founded the Polish branch of the SIGNIUM International headhunting company.

He is a co-founder of Radio ESKA in Wrocław.

== Four consecutive terms as the Mayor of Wrocław (2002-2018) ==
In 2002, with the support of incumbent Mayor of Wrocław, Bogdan Zdrojewski, the PO party (Platforma Obywatelska) and PIS (Prawo i Sprawiedliwość), Dutkiewicz won the first direct mayoral elections in Wrocław.

In 2006, he successfully stood as an independent (endorsed by the PO-PIS coalition) and having secured 84.53% of Wrocław citizens votes (with 40,04% turnout) he ensured a landslide victory for himself in the first round. His result was the second best in the country.

In 2010 he once more won the mayoral elections in the first round again, with approximately 72% of the vote, and has remained in office for a third term. In the same year President Lech Kaczyński appointed him a member of the National Development Council.

In 2014, he ran again in the mayoral elections and won in the second round defeating PIS (Prawo i Sprawiedliwość) candidate Mirosława Stachowiak-Różecka. The run-off turnout reached almost 55% of eligible votes.

Rafał Dutkiewicz's 16 years of service as the Mayor of Wrocław ended on 19 November 2018.

== Business initiatives ==
From the beginning of his first term, one of the main goals Dutkiewicz had set was attracting domestic and foreign capital to Wrocław. As a result, the city saw the highest number of investments in its post-war history and the first European country with the Wrocław Agglomeration benefiting from over 400 thousand new jobs created by foreign and local business investors. These investments have become a pillar of the city's knowledge-based economy and start-ups choosing the Wrocław Technology Park as their operating basis.

Wrocław became an attractive venue for the growing number of foreigners - approximately 200 thousand expats from over 120 countries decided to work and live in Wrocław Agglomeration (including over 100 thousand Ukrainians).

During Dutkiewicz's tenures, Wrocław's GDP per capita doubled, and it was ranked the second city in Poland with the highest pace of economic growth. The unemployment rate continued to keep the lowering tendency: from 8% in 2006 to 1,9 % in 2018.

According to 2018 statistics, Wrocław is ranked the third fastest growing city with Dublin and Prague at the head of the list of 200 European cities with populations above 250 thousand.

== Wrocław key infrastructure projects and innovation initiatives (2002-2018) ==
Dutkiewicz's mayoralty was a period of an infrastructure boom in the city with such major projects as:

- an extension of the Wrocław Airport with a new terminal
- the National Forum of Music and HYDROPOLIS
- launching of Nowe Żerniki, a model housing estate drawing inspiration from the Bauhaus movement
- renovation of the Centennial Hall with a new multimedia fountain, Wrocław ZOO with Afrykarium and the CAPITOL music theatre
- restoration of the White Stork Synagogue and the Four Denominations District
- endorsement of the Wrocław Research Centre EIT+, which finally has joined the European Institute of Innovation and Technology by means of so-called EIT KIK (Knowledge Innovation Communities), focusing on climate and strategic materials.
- as the first European city Wrocław hosted Knowledge Hub Academia Europaea, institution gathering 5,000 European scientists and over 50 Nobel Prize laureates.

== Culture and sports ==
During his mayoral term Dutkiewicz endorsed and led a range of activities aimed at promoting Wrocław as a hub of culture, a meeting place for a political debate and a destination for sport fans.

After an initial setback to the city's plans to host EXPO 2010, the Mayor and his team successfully organised and held many international events such as the Weimar Triangle Summit Meeting (2003), the European Culture Congress (2011) and the Global Forum, a prestigious meeting of politicians and diplomats, co-organised with the Atlantic Council (2010-2016).

Wrocław organized FIBA EuroBasket (2009) and Acrobatic Gymnastics World Championship (2010), and was one of the host cities of UEFA Euro 2012 Football Championship, the 2014 FIVB Volleyball Men's World Championship and the 2017 World Games - a competition in 37 non-Olympic sport disciplines.

Dutkiewicz, as the member of the chapter of Jan Nowak-Jeziorański Prize, has internationally popularized this annual ceremony, since 2004 organised on 4 June. Prominent laureates who were awarded this prestigious prize and visited Wrocław include Tadeusz Mazowiecki, Zbigniew Brzeziński, Siergiej Kowaliow, Stanisław Szuszkiewicz, Valdas Adamkus, Leszek Balcerowicz, Tomas Venclova, Borys Gudziak, Szewach Weiss and Joachim Gauck

In 2009 Dutkiewicz initiated the exhibition "Europe – It's Our History" in Wrocław Centennial Hall, co-organised with the Museum of Europe in Brussels and visited by 85 thousand guests.

The city was designated the European Capital of Culture for 2016, a title shared with San Sebastian (Spain), hosting over 4,000 events such as the European Film Awards ceremony and the Theatrical Olympics.

In 2016, Wrocław became the first Polish city to win the title of UNESCO World Book Capital.

Other cultural initiatives launched during Dutkiewicz's mayoral term included the International Film Festival Era Nowe Horyzonty (originally held in Cieszyn), the ANGELUS Literary Award, the SILESIUS Wrocław Poetic Award and the re-established JAZZ nad Odrą Festival.

One of the important promotional initiatives of Dutkiewicz's mayoralty was launched in 2005, when first figures of Wrocław gnomes appeared in the city space. The campaign has been successfully continued and the number of small, funny statutes is still growing (the number reaches 350 different figures, dispersed in the city), while Wrocław gnome has become widely recognized symbol of Wrocław in Poland and abroad. The figure of Well-Wisher gnome was handed over by Mayor Dutkiewicz to the mayors of Wrocław partner cities (Breda, Vilnius, Kaunas, Dresden, Wiesbaden, Reykjavik, Lviv, Oxford, Guadalajara, Hradec Kralove) and sent to Washington and Berlin.

One of the main purposes of Mayor Dutkiewicz's presidency - the promotion of Wrocław internationally as business-oriented metropolia, hub of innovation, science and culture - was supported by new partnerships with European cities, launched from 2002 to 2018. Wrocław signed new partner agreements with Lviv (Ukraine, 2002), Hradec Kralove (Czechia, 2003), Kaunas (Lithuania, 2003), Lille (France, 2013), Vilnius (Lithuania, 2014), Reykjavík (Iceland, 2017) and Oxford (United Kingdom, 2018).

From 2002 to 2018 R.Dutkiewicz initiated several internationally renowned cultural projects in European cities:

- Strasbourg: The glass sphere called United Earth set in the focal point of the Agora of the European Parliament relates to the great idea of openness and expansion of the European Union (2004).
- Lviv: The monument commemorating the group of 25 professors of the Lviv Polytechnic and the Jan Kazimierz University in Lviv was executed on the Wuleckie Hills on 4 July 1941. The monument by Prof. Aleksander Śliwa was created on the initiative of the Mayor of Wrocław and the Mayor of Lviv, Andrij Sadowy. It was unveiled on 3 July 2011 in Lviv.
- Paris: Three installations were set in the Saint-Germain-des-Prés church: a plaque commemorating Polish King Jan Kazimierz, the founder of the University of Lviv (2011), the busts of Pope John Paul II (2014) and Edith Stein (Teresia Benedicte a Cruce OCD) in 2018.
- Berlin: A Fritz Stern bust was unveiled on 10 October 2018 in Berlin-Brandenburg Academy of Sciences, to commemorate the outstanding historian, born in pre-war Breslau. The work of art was created by Barbara Olech.

During his mayorship, R. Dutkiewicz consequently fostered an idea of Wrocław as open and tolerant city regardless the race or religious denomination. In 2016, on International Day of Peace, he invited the highest representatives of different denominations to the meeting in the Church of Peace in Świdnica, where they signed the ‘’Appeal of Peace’’. This inter-faith document was signed on 21 September by the highest representatives of the Roman Catholic, Evangelical Lutheran, Ukrainian Greek Catholic, Orthodox and Pentecostal churches, Jewish and Muslim communities and the 14th Dalai Lama.

It was the third visit of the Dalai Lama in Wrocław, on the invitation of the Mayor Dutkiewicz (in 2008, 2010 and 2016). In 2008 HH Dalailama was awarded the title of the Honorary Citizen of Wrocław by the City Council.

== Community and social welfare projects ==
Wrocław Centre for Social Development and the "Wrocław With No Barriers" programme (both focused on people with disabilities) were important social initiatives developed during the four terms of Dutkiewicz's mayoralty. With the goal of promoting democratic engagement, enabling community-driven initiatives and fostering inter-cultural dialogue the city launched the Civic Budget.

== Recent activities ==
In April 2019, on invitation of the prestigious Robert Bosch Academy, Dutkiewicz began his residency as a fellow at the Richard von Weizsäcker Academy and moved to work from Berlin. His main focus was urban development, local democracy and European integration.

His recent engagements and contributions include:

- working with the Deutscher Staedtetag and the Democracy Study Centre in Kyiv
- liaising with the Zukunft Berlin Foundation as a co-organizer of the conference commemorating the 30th anniversary of the fall of the Berlin Wall
- collaborating with the EU–Japan Fest foundation in organizing a conference on the European Capital of Culture

In November 2019, Dutkiewicz followed in the footsteps of Władysław Bartoszewski and Bronisław Komorowski as the third Polish speaker to deliver a speech in Bundestag.

In April 2020 he was admitted as a Senior Fellow in the Democracy Study Centre in Kyiv.

== Memberships ==
- honorary senator of the Ukrainian Catholic University in Lviv in 2010 (previously the senator for many years)
- honorary member of Academia Europaea for all merits to the development of science (2011)
- honorary member of the Atlantic Council think-tank (2012)
- member of Wrocław University Council (2019/2020; 2021/2024)

== Selected awards ==
- Officer of the Order of the Crown - a national order of the Kingdom of Belgium (2006)
- Order of the Star of Italian Solidarity (Italy, 2006)
- Knight's Cross of the Order of Polonia Restituta (Poland, 2009)
- Order of the Polar Star (Sweden, 2011)
- Knight of the Legion of Honour (France, 2013)
- Commander's Cross of the Order of Polonia Restituta (Poland, 2015)
- Erich Kästner-Preis, awarded by the "Presseclub Dresden" for his commitment to humanitarian issues and promotion of tolerance (2015)
- Order of Merit of the Federal Republic of Germany (Germany, 2017)
- Deutscher Nationalpreis (2017)
- Jerusalem Prize in recognition of merit to the State of Israel and Polish-Jewish community (2019)
- Promotional Emblem of the White Eagle Foundation (2019)
- Europaurkunde, awarded by the government of Brandenburgia (2019)
- Order of Merit of the Free State of Saxony (2019)
- Doctor honoris causa by the Technical University of Wrocław in recognition of exceptional contribution to the development of the university (Poland, July 2020)
- St. Hedwig of Silesia Prize (Nagroda Księżnej Jadwigi Śląskiej) by the University of Wrocław, in recognition of exceptional merit to the Polish-German reconciliation (Poland, October 2020)
- Medal "Bene Merentibus” by the SARP (Polish Architects Association) (Poland, October 2020)

== Honors and prizes ==
- medals of: Solidarność Walcząca Association, Association of War Veterans of the Republic of Poland (Związek Inwalidów Wojennych RP), Association of Siberian Deportees (Związek Sybiraków), Home Army Association (Stowarzyszenie Żołnierzy AK)
- Józef Tischner Prize (Nagroda im.ks. Józefa Tischnera) awarded by the Publishing Company ZNAK for book, Nowe Horyzonty (2006)
- title of "The Man of the Year" awarded by Forbes (2006)
- Grzegorz Palka Prize awarded by Liga Krajowa
- triple Newsweek award for the 1st score in the mayors' ranking (in 2010, 2011, 2012 and Superprezydent title in 2013)
- honorary citizen of Gmina Długołęka (2012) and his hometown - Mikstat
- In November 2019 Dutkiewicz was the third Pole in history to deliver a speech in Bundestag during the national celebrations of Volkstrauertag, the National Day of Mourning. In the proceeding years speeches were delivered by President of France Emmanuel Macron and Presidents of Germany: Joachim Gauck and Frank-Walter Steinmeier.

== Publications ==
- , Nowe horyzonty'' (Wyd.Rosner&Wspólnicy, Warszawa 2006, ISBN 83-60336-12-1)

- extended interview, Prezydent. Rafał Dutkiewicz (nie tylko) o Wrocławiu (2018)

- articles in Die Welt and Gazeta Wyborcza on critical analysis of Ivan Krastev and Stephan Holmes’ book ‘’Das Licht, das erlosch’’ (, Światło, które zgasło’’)

- ’’The Incredible Cosmopolitanism of Wrocław’’ in ‘’Arts & International Affairs Journal’’ (2019)

Nr 4.2, Autumn 2019

== Languages ==
Dutkiewicz is fluent in German, English, and Russian.
