= Robert Raczyński =

Polish politician and mayor (born 1962)

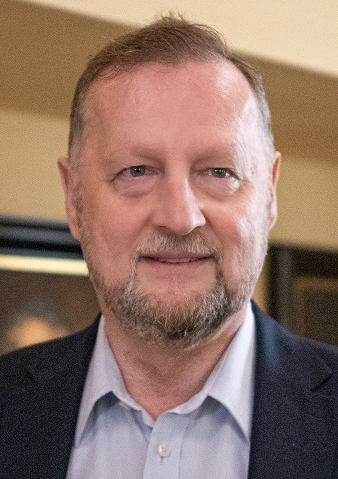
- Raczyński in 2024

Mayor of Lubin
- Incumbent
- Assumed office 2002
- Preceded by: Roman Sadowski

Mayor of Lubin
- In office 1990–1994
- Preceded by: Ryszard Maraszek
- Succeeded by: Tadeusz Maćkała

Chair of Bezpartyjni Samorządowcy
- In office December 2020 – 25 October 2024
- Preceded by: Position established
- Succeeded by: Marek Woch

Personal details
- Born: 3 April 1962 (age 64) Lubin, Poland
- Education: University of Wrocław

Robert Raczyński (Polish: [ˈrɔbɛrt-raˈt͡szɨɲski]; born 3 April 1962) is a Polish politician and local government official who served as mayor of Lubin from 1990 to 1994 and has held the office again since 2002. He was a founder and leader of the regional political movement Bezpartyjni Samorządowcy and chaired its nationwide federation from 2020 to 2024.

== Early life and opposition activity ==
Raczyński was born in Lubin and graduated in history from the University of Wrocław. From 1982 to 1987, he was active in the underground structures of the Independent Students' Association at the university and distributed underground publications. Between 1987 and 1989, he contributed to the underground newspaper Gazeta Lubińska and participated in initiatives organised by the Labour Ministry at the parish of Saint Maximilian Kolbe in Lubin. From April to June 1989, he was a member of the local Solidarity Citizens' Committee.

== Political career ==
=== Mayor of Lubin ===
In 1990, at the age of 28, Raczyński was elected the first non-communist mayor of Lubin. He held the office until 1994 and did not seek another term in that year's local elections.

Raczyński returned to the office after winning the second round of the first direct mayoral election in 2002. He subsequently stood through local electoral committees bearing his name and was re-elected in the first round in 2006 with 65.46 per cent of the vote and in 2010 with 72.40 per cent.

He won further first-round re-elections in 2014 with 70.76 per cent and in 2018 with 58.61 per cent. In the 2024 Polish local elections, he was elected for another term in the first round, receiving 15,304 votes, or 60.96 per cent.

=== Regional and national politics ===
During the 1990s, Raczyński was active in the Party of Christian Democrats and later in Solidarity Electoral Action. He unsuccessfully contested the 1991 Polish parliamentary election on the Party of Christian Democrats list and the 1993 Polish parliamentary election for the Catholic Electoral Committee "Fatherland".

From 1998 to 2002, he represented Solidarity Electoral Action in the Lower Silesian Voivodeship Sejmik. He was elected to the assembly again in 2010 from a committee led by Rafał Dutkiewicz, but relinquished the mandate after being re-elected mayor.

In 2008, Raczyński was one of the founders of the Lower Silesia XXI association, which initially formed part of the nationwide Poland XXI movement. The association was renamed Citizens of Lower Silesia in 2011. Following a division within the organisation over cooperation with Civic Platform, Raczyński became one of the leaders of the newly established Bezpartyjni Samorządowcy movement in 2014.

The movement won four seats in the Lower Silesian assembly in the 2014 local elections. In 2015, its activists participated in the establishment of JOW Bezpartyjni, an electoral committee advocating the introduction of single-member districts. Bezpartyjni Samorządowcy subsequently developed into a nationwide movement, winning 15 regional assembly seats in five voivodeships in the 2018 Polish local elections.

In December 2020, Raczyński became the first chair of the Nationwide Federation "Bezpartyjni i Samorządowcy". He was registered as the lead candidate on the federation's Legnica constituency list for the 2023 Polish parliamentary election, but submitted his withdrawal shortly before polling day and was removed from the list.

On 25 October 2024, Marek Woch replaced Raczyński as chair of the nationwide federation. In April 2025, the Lower Silesian organisation associated with Raczyński stated that Woch was not its candidate in the 2025 Polish presidential election and did not represent its political position. The national federation subsequently removed the Lower Silesian organisation from its structures.

On 2 March 2026, Raczyński was appointed to the Local Government Council attached to the President of Poland.

== Surveillance investigation ==
In early 2024, purported transcripts presented as records of communications involving Raczyński and another local government official became the subject of a criminal investigation. In February 2026, prosecutors determined that the approximately 1,000 pages of purported transcripts had been fabricated.

In May 2026, five people, including a former officer of the Internal Security Agency and a serving police officer, were charged in an ongoing investigation concerning illegal surveillance, the creation of false evidence, abuse of public authority and the disclosure of protected information.

== Honours ==
- Bronze Cross of Merit (1994)
- Silver Cross of Merit (2005)
- Knight's Cross of the Order of Polonia Restituta (2015)
- Cross of Freedom and Solidarity (2017)
