= Maria Ilnicka-Mądry =

Polish politician (1946–2023)

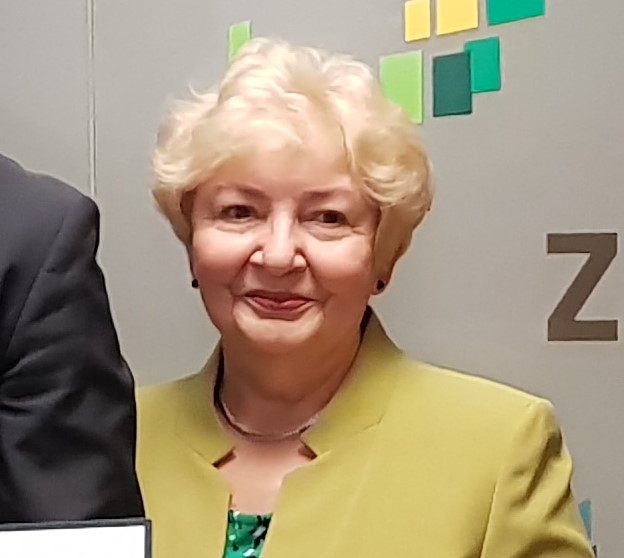
- Ilnicka-Mądry in 2019

Chair of the West Pomeranian Regional Assembly
- In office 23 November 2018 – 20 March 2023
- Preceded by: Teresa Kalina

Personal details
- Born: Maria Stanisława Ilnicka-Mądry; 1 February 1946 Huta Szklana, Poland
- Died: 20 March 2023 (aged 77) Szczecin, Poland
- Party: BS
- Education: Pomeranian Medical University in Szczecin
- Awards: Silver Cross of Merit; Badge of Honor of the West Pomeranian Griffin

Maria Stanisława Ilnicka-Mądry (Polish pronunciation: [ˈmarja staɲiˈswava ilˈɲitska ˈmɔndrɨ]; 1 February 1946 – 20 March 2023) was a Polish politician, physician, university teacher of medicine and from 2018 to 2023, chair of the West Pomeranian Regional Assembly of the 6th term.

== Early life ==
Maria Ilnicka-Mądry was born on 1 February 1946 in Huta Szklana. She was an alumnus of the Maria Skłodowska-Curie High School in Szczecin and a graduate of medicine at Pomeranian Medical University in Szczecin. She obtained a PhD in medical sciences and a medical specialty degree in internal medicine. She later also completed postgraduate studies in healthcare management at University of Warsaw.

== Medical career ==
Ilnicka-Mądry was a vice-president of the District Chamber of Physicians and Dentists in Szczecin for two terms (1991–1999). She was an academic teacher at the Department of Hygiene, Epidemiology and Public Health at her alma mater (later transformed into the Pomeranian Medical University in Szczecin).

In 1998 she was appointed director of the Independent Public Clinical Hospital No. 1 PUM in Szczecin, which she managed until her retirement in 2014. On 4 December 2008, in Royal Castle in Warsaw she was awarded Manager of the Year in the area of public health service. During her term as director, the facility had never been in debt.

== Political career ==
On behalf of the Freedom Union, she was a councilor in the West Pomeranian Regional Assembly of the first term (1998–2002). In the 2002 local elections, the coalition from which she was a candidate (Solidarity Electoral Action) did not get any seats. She received 3689 votes.

In 2010, she unsuccessfully ran for councilor in Szczecin on behalf of the committee of the city mayor Piotr Krzystek Szczecin for Generations. In the 2014 local elections, she was the only councilor elected from the Independent West Pomeranian election committee list organized by Piotr Krzystek. She became a non-attached councilor. In 2015, she became an advisor to Piotr Krzystek for the city's social policy.

In 2018, she ran for voivodeship councilor from the Nonpartisan Local Government Activists list. She retained her mandate when Aleksander Doba resigned from his mandate before his term began. On 23 November 2018, she was elected as chair of the West Pomeranian Regional Assembly by the votes of all 30 councilors.

Ilnicka-Mądry was an advisor of Szczecin city mayor Piotr Krzystek. She was a member of the Social Council of the West Pomeranian Oncology Center in Szczecin.

== Honours and decorations ==
=== National honours ===
| Ribbon bar | Honour | Date |
|---|---|---|
| | Silver Cross of Merit | 11 September 2002 |
| | Badge of Honor of the West Pomeranian Griffin | 12 December 2012 |
