= Marek Woch =

Polish lawyer and politician (born 1978)

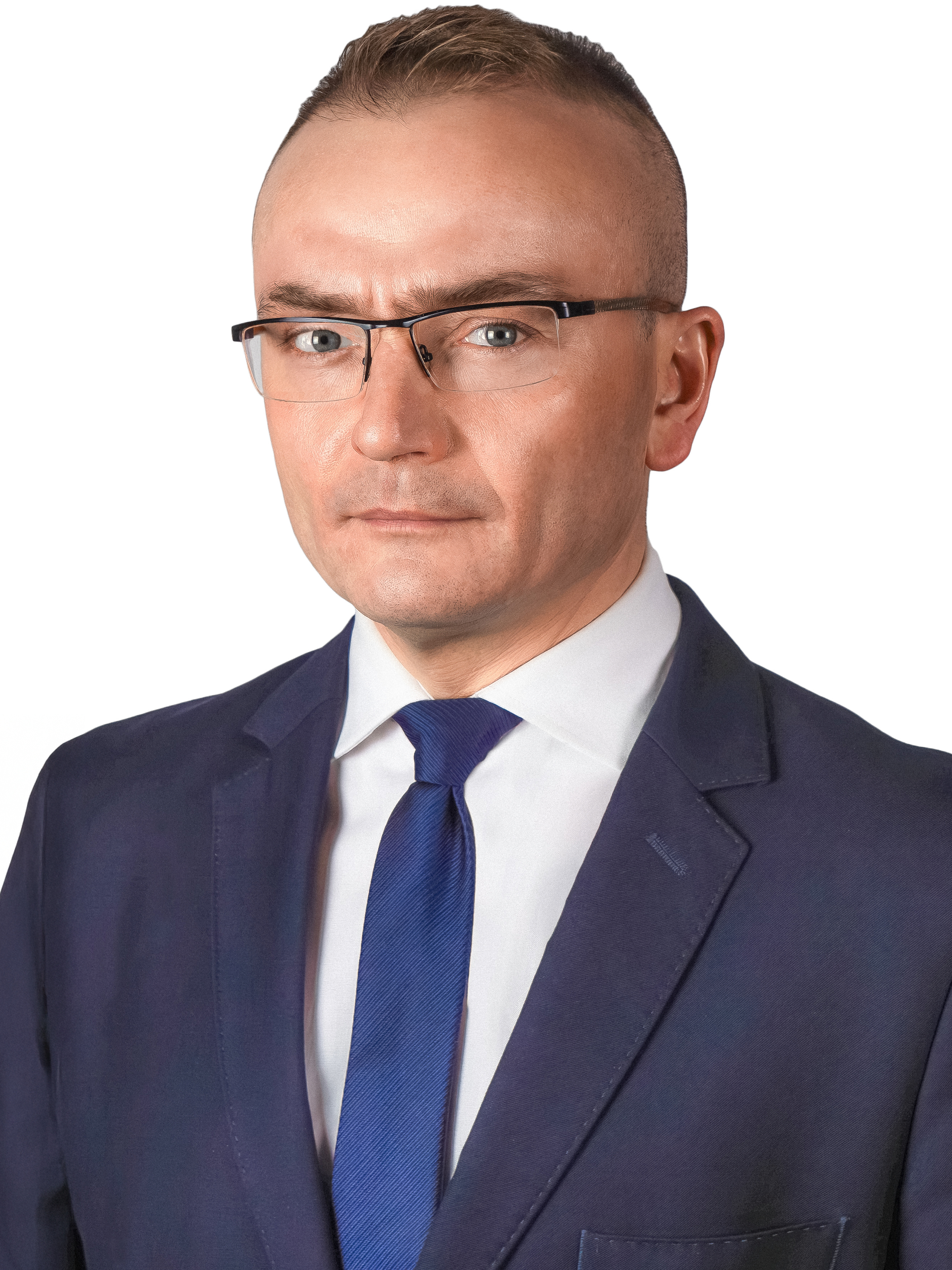
- Woch in 2024

President of the Labour Party
- Incumbent
- Assumed office 20 September 2025
- Preceded by: Zbigniew Wrzesiński

Chairman of Bezpartyjni Samorządowcy
- Incumbent
- Assumed office 25 October 2024
- Preceded by: Robert Raczyński

Personal details
- Born: Marek Marian Woch; 17 December 1978 (age 47) Kąkolewnica, Poland
- Party: Labour Party
- Other political affiliations: Bezpartyjni Samorządowcy
- Education: University of Warsaw; SGH Warsaw School of Economics; Warsaw Management University

Marek Marian Woch (Polish: [ˈmarɛk-'vɔt͡sx]; born 17 December 1978) is a Polish lawyer and politician. He has chaired the nationwide federation Bezpartyjni Samorządowcy since October 2024 and has served as president of the Labour Party since September 2025.

Woch was a candidate in the 2025 Polish presidential election, finishing last among thirteen candidates with 18,338 votes, or 0.09 per cent. In October 2025, he announced a proposed Senate electoral pact with far-right leader Grzegorz Braun. In July 2026, Woch and Law and Justice leader Jarosław Kaczyński announced cooperation intended to establish a broader right-wing pact for the next Senate election.

== Early life and education ==
Woch was born on 17 December 1978 in Kąkolewnica, in the Lublin Voivodeship. He initially attended a vocational school before continuing his education in law.

He graduated from the Faculty of Law and Administration of the University of Warsaw, where he obtained a doctorate in legal sciences. He also completed postgraduate studies at the SGH Warsaw School of Economics and Warsaw Management University.

== Professional career ==
From 2015 to 2019, Woch served as an expert to the parliamentary group for supporting entrepreneurship and economic patriotism. Between 2016 and 2019, he was the plenipotentiary of the president of the National Health Fund for relations with non-governmental organisations and public authorities.

Woch joined the Office of the Ombudsman for Small and Medium-Sized Enterprises in 2019. He was promoted to director-general in November 2020 and was appointed deputy Ombudsman for Small and Medium-Sized Enterprises on 18 January 2023. He held the latter office until June 2024.

His academic interests have included constitutional law, health law and the philosophy of law. He has also worked as a lecturer and published on legal and healthcare-related subjects.

== Political career ==
=== Early candidacies ===
Woch unsuccessfully ran for wójt of Gmina Kąkolewnica in a 2013 by-election and in the 2014 and 2018 Polish local elections. He received 84 votes in 2013, 141 in 2014 and 170 in 2018.

In the 2015 Polish parliamentary election, he ran as an independent candidate for the Senate, receiving 11,413 votes. He subsequently contested the 2019 European Parliament election in Poland for Poland Fair Play, the 2019 Polish parliamentary election for the Coalition of Nonpartisan and Local Government Activists and the 2023 Polish parliamentary election for Bezpartyjni Samorządowcy, without winning a seat.

In 2024, he ran unsuccessfully for the Lublin Voivodeship Sejmik and for the European Parliament, receiving 1,933 and 3,326 votes respectively.

=== Leadership and presidential campaign ===
On 25 October 2024, Woch was elected chairman of the board of the Nationwide Federation "Bezpartyjni i Samorządowcy" for the 2024–2028 term, succeeding Robert Raczyński. The federation subsequently selected him as its candidate in the 2025 Polish presidential election.

His presidential candidacy was endorsed by several small organisations, including Social Alternative, the Labour Party, the Slavic Union and the Camp of Great Poland. Woch finished last among thirteen candidates, receiving 18,338 votes, or 0.09 per cent.

Before the second round, he endorsed Karol Nawrocki, the candidate supported by Law and Justice.

On 20 September 2025, Woch became president of the Labour Party as part of a declared "personal and programme union" between the party, his federation and several smaller organisations. Former party president Zbigniew Wrzesiński became its honorary president.

== Political views ==
During the 2025 presidential campaign, Woch advocated replacing Poland's parliamentary system with a presidential–parliamentary system, increasing the powers of the president and creating the office of vice-president. He also proposed establishing a Polish National Guard under presidential authority.

Woch supported Poland acquiring its own nuclear weapons rather than relying solely on NATO nuclear sharing. His economic and administrative proposals included ending public subsidies for political parties, abolishing the National Health Fund and substantially restructuring or abolishing the Social Insurance Institution.

== Political alliances and controversies ==
=== Dispute within Bezpartyjni Samorządowcy ===
During the 2025 presidential campaign, a Lower Silesian faction using the Bezpartyjni Samorządowcy name stated that Woch was not its candidate and did not represent its political position. Woch responded that he had been nominated by the nationwide federation and called for the removal of the Lower Silesian activists from its structures.

The conflict continued after three Lower Silesian regional councillors associated with the movement entered a coalition with the Polish People's Party. They were expelled from Woch's federation but continued to use the Bezpartyjni Samorządowcy name as a separate regional grouping.

=== Associations with nationalist and pro-Russian groups ===
During the 2025 presidential campaign, Woch accepted the endorsement of the Slavic Union, a Russophile political party that supports Poland's withdrawal from the European Union and closer relations with Russia and Belarus. The Camp of Great Poland also endorsed him and made its domain prezydent25.pl redirect visitors to Woch's campaign website.

In August 2025, Woch's federation announced that it intended to form a "personal and programme union" with the Camp of Great Poland. Two members of the association's governing bodies, Dawid Hudziec and Dawid Berezicki, had previously been involved in pro-Russian activities. Hudziec had lived in Russian-occupied Donetsk since 2014 and worked for the Russian outlet Novorossia Today. Berezicki had been placed under Ukrainian sanctions in 2015 for cooperation with the Novorossia news agency and was linked through leaked correspondence to Russian-funded pro-Russian demonstrations.

Woch stated that the proposed cooperation with the Camp of Great Poland was intended to help replace sitting members of parliament in the 2027 election. The planned merger was abandoned before the federation's unification congress in September 2025.

At the congress, the federation instead entered an arrangement with several other small organisations. These included an entity presented as the "National Camp", represented symbolically by nationalist activist Marcin Makowski. Makowski had previously stood for the Akcja Narodowa alliance and was associated with circles surrounding the nationalist weekly Myśl Polska and the radical, pro-Russian Kamraci movement.

=== Agreements with Grzegorz Braun and Law and Justice ===
In October 2025, Woch and Grzegorz Braun announced plans for a right-wing and centre-right electoral pact in the next Senate election. The proposed arrangement was intended to prevent participating parties from standing competing candidates in individual Senate constituencies.

In May 2026, Woch said that he did not regard Braun as politically untouchable and described Braun as the first national political leader with whom he had reached an agreement. He stated that the proposed pact remained open to candidates associated with Law and Justice and other right-wing parties.

On 15 July 2026, Woch and Law and Justice chairman Jarosław Kaczyński announced cooperation aimed at arranging a common right-wing slate for the next Senate election. Kaczyński stated that the final structure had not been decided and could take the form of either a direct alliance or a separate civic electoral committee. Woch described the agreement as an expansion of his previously proposed Senate pact.

=== Employee-rights investigation ===
In May 2025, the Warsaw-Śródmieście District Prosecutor's Office was conducting an investigation into alleged persistent and malicious violations of employee rights at the Office of the Ombudsman for Small and Medium-Sized Enterprises. The investigation followed an anonymous complaint forwarded by the Warsaw Bar Association and concerned alleged conduct between September 2018 and January 2023.

The inquiry covered allegations of intimidation, failure to pay employees for overtime work and physical violence. Several former employees had previously accused Woch of harassment, verbal abuse and requiring unpaid work outside normal hours. At the time the investigation became public, Woch was participating in the proceedings as a witness rather than as a suspect. He described the allegations as a political attack on Bezpartyjni Samorządowcy during an election campaign.

== Electoral history ==
=== President ===
Election	Affiliation	Votes	%	Result
2025	Bezpartyjni Samorządowcy	18,338	0.09%	Not elected

=== Sejm ===
Election	Affiliation	Votes	%	Constituency	Result
2019	Bezpartyjni Samorządowcy	1,314	0.23%	No. 6	Not elected
2023	Bezpartyjni Samorządowcy	2,500	0.39%	No. 6	Not elected

=== Senate ===
Election	Affiliation	Votes	%	Constituency	Result
2015	Independent	11,413	11.75%	No. 17	Not elected

=== European Parliament ===
Election	Affiliation	Votes	%	Constituency	Result
2019	Poland Fair Play	2,040	0.28%	Lublin	Not elected
2024	Bezpartyjni Samorządowcy	3,326	0.25%	Warsaw	Not elected

=== Wójt of Kąkolewnica ===
Election	Affiliation	Votes	%	Result
2013	Independent	84	2.74%	Not elected
2014	Independent	141	3.59%	Not elected
2018	Independent	170	4.26%	Not elected

=== Regional assemblies ===
Election	Affiliation	Votes	%	Assembly	Result
2024	Bezpartyjni Samorządowcy	1,933	0.77%	Lublin	Not elected
