= Baltic Sea States Sub-regional Co-operation =

International network of local governments

- Headquarters: Szczecin, West Pomerania, Poland
- Official languages: English
- Type: International network
- Members: Denmark, Estonia, Finland, Germany, Latvia, Lithuania, Poland, Norway, Sweden

Leaders
  - President: Olgierd Geblewicz
- Establishment: 1993; 32 years ago
- Website www.bsssc.com

Baltic Sea States Sub-regional Co-operation, BSSSC is an international network associating local governments and local government organizations of the countries around the Baltic Sea. It was established in 1993 under the Stavanger Declaration as a result of the establishing Council of the Baltic Sea States a year earlier.

It has an observer status in HELCOM.

== History ==
The BSSSC was founded in October 1993 in Stavanger, Norway, pursuant to the Stavanger Declaration, the result of the establishment of the Council of the Baltic Sea States in 1992.

In 2009, the BSSSC initiated, together with the European Commission, the Idea Café Project aimed at promoting joint funds for the Baltic Sea region. In 2020, due to the COVID-19 pandemic, the annual conference was held for the first time in the remote formula. In 2021, the BSSSC adopted a joint resolution on the future of the Baltic Sea in the context of climate change, cross-border cooperation and weapons lingering at the bottom of the Baltic Sea. In March 2022, during the Russian invasion of Ukraine, the BSSSC excluded Russian regions from the organization.

== Structure and mission ==
The goal of the BSSSC is to strengthen regional cooperation as well as to support the interests of its members among decision-makers from the European Union. Political priorities of BSSSC are:

- EU cohesion policy
- EU Strategy for the Baltic Sea
- Innovations / Smart Specialization
- Culture, creative industries and regional identity
- Transport and communication connections

The organization consists of:

- chairman who represents organizations outside and conducts board meetings;
- board, which is the decision-making body of the BSSSC;
- annual BSSSC conference, which is the organisation's main forum;
- secretariat that changes with the president and is responsible for the day-to-day administration of the organization.
