= Olgierd Geblewicz =

Polish politician, the marshal of the West Pomeranian voivodeship

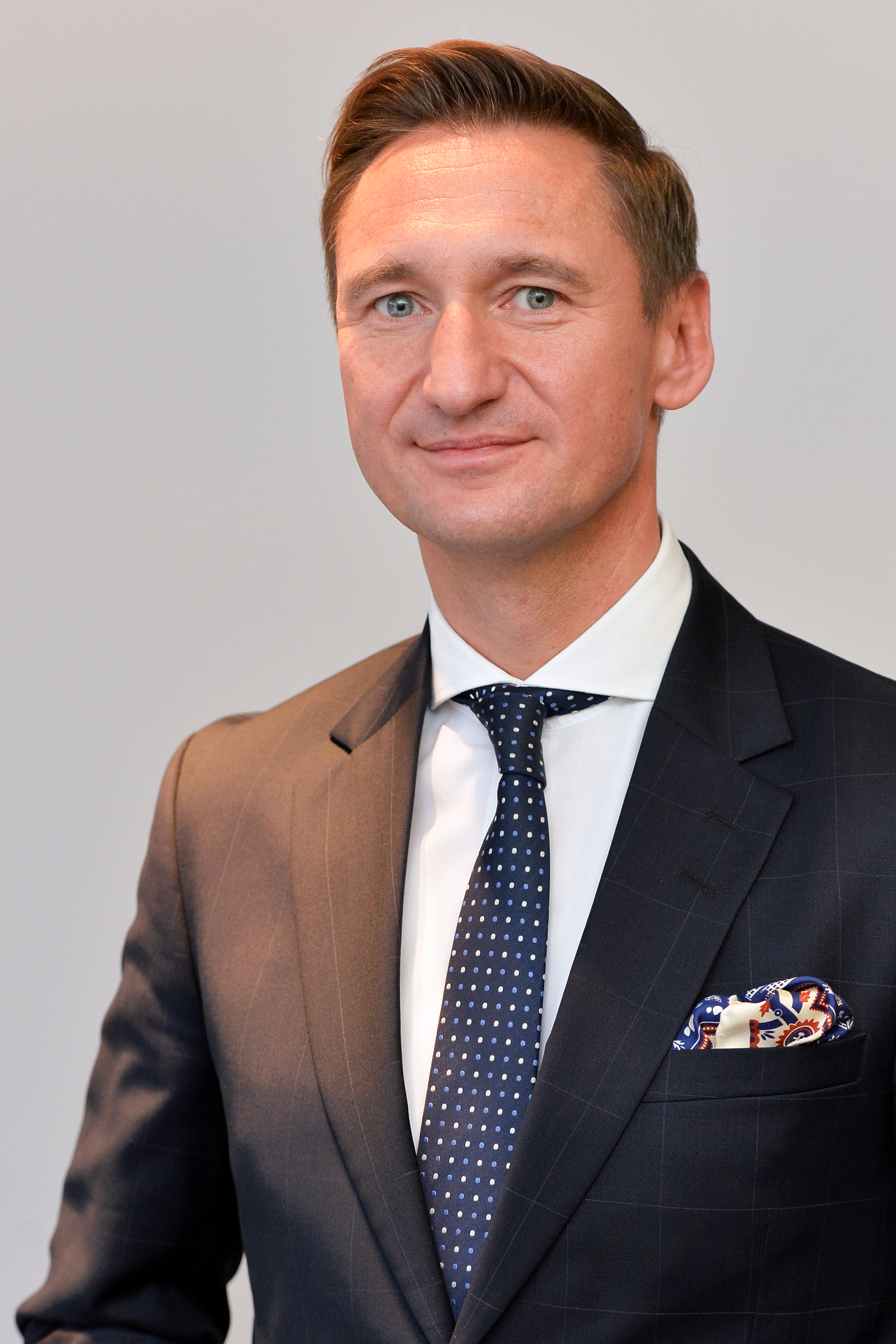

Marshal of West Pomeranian Voivodeship
- Incumbent
- Assumed office 7 December 2010
- Preceded by: Władysław Husejko

Chairman of the West Pomeranian Regional Assembly
- In office 2 December 2008 – 29 November 2010
- Preceded by: Michał Łuczak
- Succeeded by: Marek Tałasiewicz

Personal details
- Born: 15 October 1972 (age 53) Goleniów, Poland
- Party: Civic Platform
- Education: University of Szczecin
- Awards: Gold Cross of Merit Badge of Honor for Merits to the Local Government

Olgierd Geblewicz (born 15 October 1972) is a Polish politician, the marshal of the West Pomeranian voivodeship (from 2010). In the years 2008–2010 he was a chairman of the West Pomeranian Regional Assembly.

== Early life ==
Olgierd Geblewicz was born on 15 October 1972 in Goleniów. He graduated in law at the Faculty of Law and Administration of the University of Szczecin and in economics at The West Pomeranian Business School. He has also completed postgraduate studies in Enterprise Management at the Faculty of Management at the University of Warsaw.

For 13 years he worked in the municipal sector (almost four years as the president of Sewage and Water Supply Plant in Szczecin). He is a member of the supervisory board of Goleniów Waterworks and Sewerage Company.

== Controversies ==
On May 13, 2021, Voivodeship Marshal Olgierd Geblewicz was involved in a road incident on the S3 road at the level of Goleniów. Geblewcz sharply pulled into the path of a truck after which he braked sharply, colliding with the speeding truck behind him. The entire incident was recorded with a car DVR. The investigation against the provincial marshal was discontinued, although the prosecutor admitted that Olgierd Geblewicz fulfilled the elements of a misdemeanor such as causing a threat to land traffic safety.

== Political career ==
In 2001 he joined the Civic Platform. In the local elections in 2002, he was elected to the Goleniów City Council. In 2006 he was elected to West Pomeranian Regional Assembly (he has obtained 8314 votes). From 2006 to 2008 he chaired the Civic Platform club in the Assembly. From 2006 he is a member of West Pomeranian section of the party.

On 2 December 2008 Geblewicz became a chairman of the West Pomeranian Regional Assembly (he obtained 16 of 30 votes). He has replaced Michał Łuczak, who resigned on the prosecution's charge of possession of a small amount of drugs. In the 2010 local elections, he was reelected to the Regional Assembly (obtaining 10 721 votes). On 29 November 2010 he was appointed marshal by 21 voivodship councilors. He began his office on 7 December of the same year. From 2010 to 2011 he was a president of Baltic Sea States Subregional Co-operation (BSSSC). Also in 2010, he became a member of the National Council of the Civic Platform.

In 2011 he became a member of the EU Committee of the Regions. In 2013 he became the president of the Szczecin Civic Platform section. of the in 2014 he was reelected to the regional council, on 1 December of the same year he was reelected for the office of Marshal of the West Pomeranian Voivodeship for the second time. On 4 March 2016 he became the president of the Association of Voivodships. In 2018, he retained the mandate of a regional councilor for another term, this time he obtained 42 494 votes (23.14%). On 23 November 2018, he was once again appointed the marshal of the voivodeship.

In January 2020, he was elected chairman of the European People's Party faction in the Committee of the Regions. In regional assembly he is a member of Committee on Agriculture and Rural Development, Committee on Budget and Local Government Affairs, Committee on Health, Social Affairs and Public Safety, The Temporary Commission for Maritime Economy and Inland Navigation and the Temporary Commission for the Honorary Badge of the West Pomeranian Griffin.

== Honours and decorations ==
=== National honours ===
Ribbon bar	Honour	Date
	Gold Cross of Merit	19 September 2012
	Badge of Honor for Merits to the Local Government	18 September 2015
	Honorary badge "Meritorious Honorary Blood Donor"	10 May 2021
