= Office of the Ombudsman for Small and Medium-Sized Enterprises =

Polish public body protecting the rights of small and medium-sized enterprises

- Biuro Rzecznika Małych i Średnich Przedsiębiorców
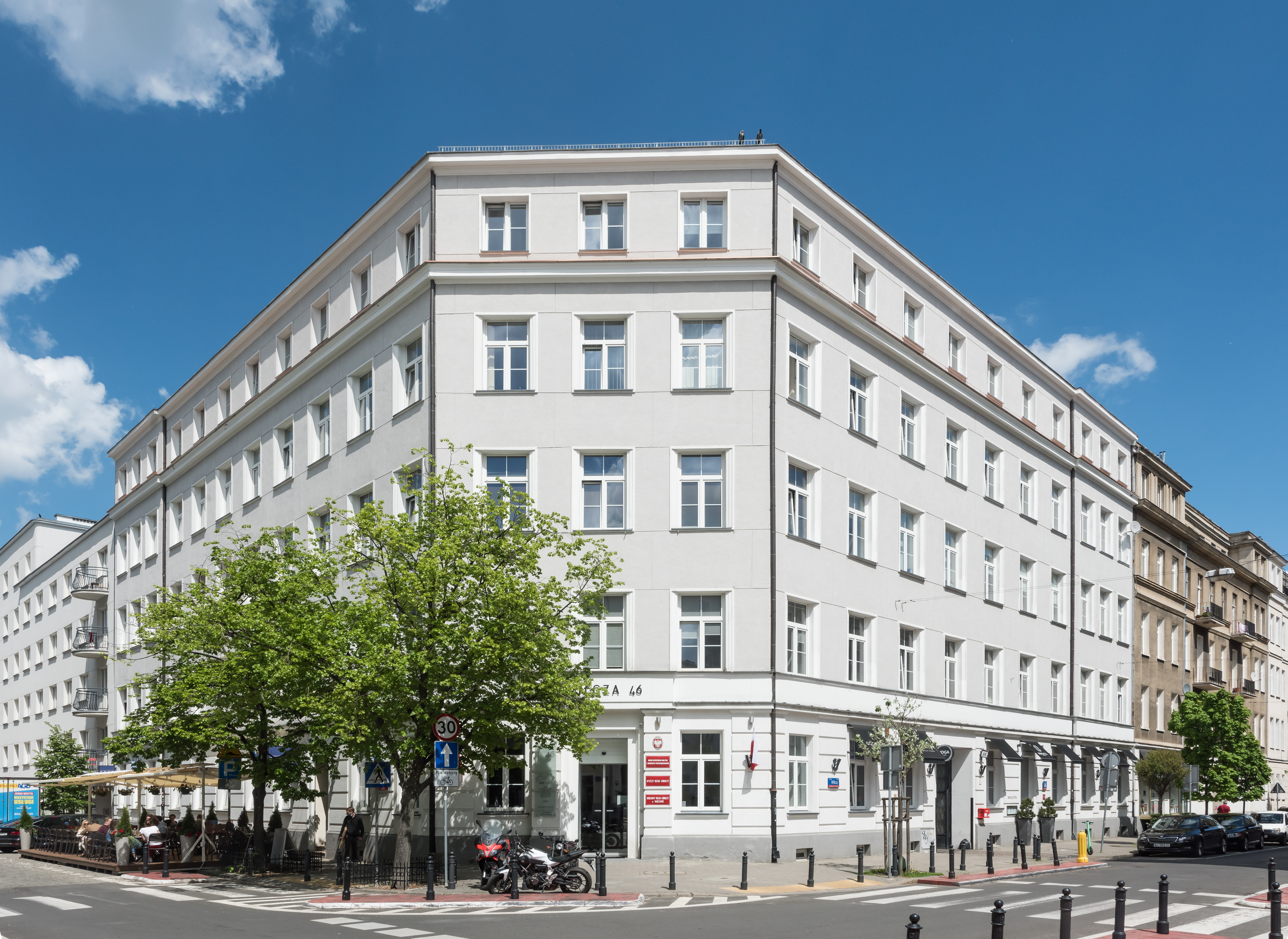
- Headquarters at 46 Wilcza Street in Warsaw

Agency overview
- Formed: 2018
- Type: State budgetary unit
- Jurisdiction: Poland
- Headquarters: 46 Wilcza Street, Warsaw, Poland
- Agency executives: Agnieszka Majewska, Ombudsman; Mariusz Filipek, Deputy Ombudsman
- Website: rzecznikmsp.gov.pl

The Office of the Ombudsman for Small and Medium-Sized Enterprises (Polish: Biuro Rzecznika Małych i Średnich Przedsiębiorców) is a Polish state budgetary unit providing organisational, legal and administrative support to the Ombudsman for Small and Medium-Sized Enterprises (Polish: Rzecznik Małych i Średnich Przedsiębiorców). The Ombudsman is a single-person public authority responsible for safeguarding the rights of micro, small and medium-sized enterprises in their relations with public administration.

The Ombudsman's statutory jurisdiction concerns actions and omissions by public administrative authorities. The Office does not intervene in private disputes between entrepreneurs.

Agnieszka Majewska has served as Ombudsman since June 2024, while Mariusz Filipek has served as Deputy Ombudsman since September 2024.

== History ==
The institution of the Ombudsman was created by the Act of 6 March 2018 on the Ombudsman for Small and Medium-Sized Enterprises. Adam Abramowicz was appointed as the first Ombudsman on 22 June 2018 for a six-year term.

The supporting Office was established under the legislation implementing the package of business laws adopted in March 2018. On 1 August 2018, the Minister of Entrepreneurship and Technology granted the Office its statute, defining its management, organisational units, regional branches and method of financing. The Warsaw headquarters was officially opened on 19 December 2018.

== Legal basis and powers ==
The Ombudsman is appointed by the Prime Minister of Poland following a motion from the minister responsible for economic affairs and consultation with representative employers' organisations. The term lasts six years, and the same person may serve only one term. The minister responsible for economic affairs appoints and dismisses the Deputy Ombudsman at the Ombudsman's request.

The Ombudsman's statutory responsibilities include protecting freedom of economic activity, strengthening entrepreneurs' trust in public authorities, promoting impartial and equal treatment, and safeguarding fair competition, sustainable development, accepted business practices and the legitimate interests of entrepreneurs.

The Ombudsman may, among other activities:

- give opinions on proposed legislation affecting entrepreneurs;
- request the preparation of legislation or official legal explanations;
- request that authorised authorities initiate administrative, civil or criminal proceedings;
- participate in administrative proceedings and proceedings before administrative courts;
- lodge complaints, cassation appeals and extraordinary complaints where authorised by law;
- request that the Supreme Court or the Supreme Administrative Court resolve divergences in case law;
- conduct or facilitate mediation between entrepreneurs and public authorities;
- cooperate with public institutions, business organisations and non-governmental organisations; and
- undertake educational and informational activities concerning the rights of entrepreneurs.

The Ombudsman may act on an application submitted by an entrepreneur or business organisation, or on the Ombudsman's own initiative. The Ombudsman does not issue binding judgments in commercial disputes and is not a substitute for a court or administrative authority.

== Organisation ==
The Office is headquartered at 46 Wilcza Street in Warsaw. It is a state budgetary unit financed from the section of the national budget allocated to economic affairs. The Ombudsman acts as a third-level administrator of the Office's budget.

The central organisational units are:

- the Ombudsman's Cabinet;
- the Preliminary Application Analysis Department;
- the Intervention and Litigation Department;
- the Legal and Legislative Department; and
- the Administration and Finance Department.

The Office also operates four regional branches:

- Białystok, covering Podlaskie and Warmian–Masurian voivodeships;
- Gdańsk, covering Kuyavian-Pomeranian, Pomeranian and West Pomeranian voivodeships;
- Kraków, covering Lesser Poland, Subcarpathian, Silesian and Świętokrzyskie voivodeships; and
- Poznań, covering Lower Silesian, Lubusz, Opole and Greater Poland voivodeships.

The Ombudsman may establish advisory councils and working groups. The advisory bodies operating alongside the Office include the Entrepreneurs' Council, the Scientific Council and the Economic Council.

== Officeholders ==
=== Ombudsmen ===
Ombudsman	Term
Adam Abramowicz	22 June 2018 – 21 June 2024
Agnieszka Majewska	23 June 2024 – present

=== Deputy ombudsmen ===
- Jacek Cieplak, from 20 September 2018 until 2021.
- Marek Woch, from 18 January 2023 until 2024.
- Mariusz Filipek, since 2 September 2024.

== Audits and controversies ==
=== Supreme Audit Office review ===
In March 2023, Poland's Supreme Audit Office (NIK) published the results of an audit covering the Office's establishment, organisation, finances and performance between 30 April 2018 and 30 June 2022. NIK concluded that the Ombudsman had generally carried out the statutory advisory and expert responsibilities properly and that the Office's financial management was generally correct. It nevertheless found that the Office had exceeded its financial plan in 2020, resulting in a breach of public-finance legislation.

The audit criticised the decision to have then director-general Marek Woch simultaneously coordinate the Legal and Legislative Department and the Administration and Finance Department. According to NIK, combining these functions did not ensure effective management control. Woch received a special allowance which, as of 28 April 2022, amounted to 79.5 per cent of his basic salary. NIK did not accept the Office's position that the arrangement represented savings for the state budget. NIK also notified the competent public-finance disciplinary authority of findings indicating a possible breach of public-finance discipline.

=== Workplace allegations and labour inspection ===
In January 2023, Dziennik Gazeta Prawna reported allegations by current and former employees that Woch, who was then the Office's director-general and subsequently became Deputy Ombudsman, had humiliated employees, used insulting and vulgar language, shouted at subordinates and required unpaid overtime.

Ombudsman Adam Abramowicz rejected the characterisation of the conduct as workplace bullying. He acknowledged that Woch had sometimes raised his voice and used swear words during disputes with employees, but declined to appoint an internal investigatory commission, stating that he did not regard the allegations as sufficiently serious to activate the procedure.

The State Labour Inspectorate subsequently inspected the Office. The inspection, completed in July 2023, found labour-law offences involving breaches of working-time regulations, delayed or incomplete payment of remuneration or other benefits, failure to grant annual leave or unjustified reductions in leave entitlement, and allowing one person to work without a written contract. A fine was imposed on the person considered responsible.

An employee survey included in the inspection materials found that 15 per cent of respondents reported reactions to their statements involving shouting or insults, 9 per cent reported threats, 15 per cent reported discrimination and 21 per cent reported a deterioration in their psychological well-being related to the workplace situation. Eleven per cent stated that they had reported workplace bullying or discrimination to the employer.

In 2025, Rzeczpospolita reported that the Warsaw-Śródmieście District Prosecutor's Office was investigating alleged persistent and malicious violations of the rights of Office employees between September 2018 and January 2023. Woch was questioned as a witness and had not been charged. He denied wrongdoing and described the allegations as a politically motivated attempt to remove him from public life. As of 16 July 2026, the proceedings were suspended pending an analysis of documentation generated during inspections of the Office, particularly the State Labour Inspectorate's report. Prosecutors stated that a decision on the further course of the proceedings would be taken after completion of the analysis.

=== Support for the voluntary social-insurance initiative ===
In 2023, media reports questioned whether Office employees and resources were being used during working hours to assist with the collection of signatures for a citizens' legislative initiative proposing voluntary social-insurance contributions for entrepreneurs, commonly described as the "voluntary ZUS" proposal.

Abramowicz said that the proposal had originated in the Entrepreneurs' Council attached to the Ombudsman and that the Office supported the policy objective. He stated, however, that the Office was not the organiser of the citizens' committee and could not participate actively in its legislative initiative.
