= West Pomeranian Voivodeship Sejmik =

West Pomeranian Voivodeship Sejmik Sejmik Województwa Zachodniopomorskiego

Type
- Type: Unicameral

Leadership
- Chairperson: Teresa Kalina, PO
- Vice- Chairperson: Marcin Przepióra, Janusz Żmurkiewicz, Sebastian Szwajlik
- Marshal: Olgierd Geblewicz, PO

Structure
- Seats: 30 councillors
- Political groups: Executive board (17): KO (15); PO (12); Z (1); Independent (2); Independent (2); PSL (1); NL (1); Opposition parties (13): PiS (10); PiS (10); Independent (3); P2050 (2); OKS (1)

Elections
- Last election: 7 April 2024

Meeting place
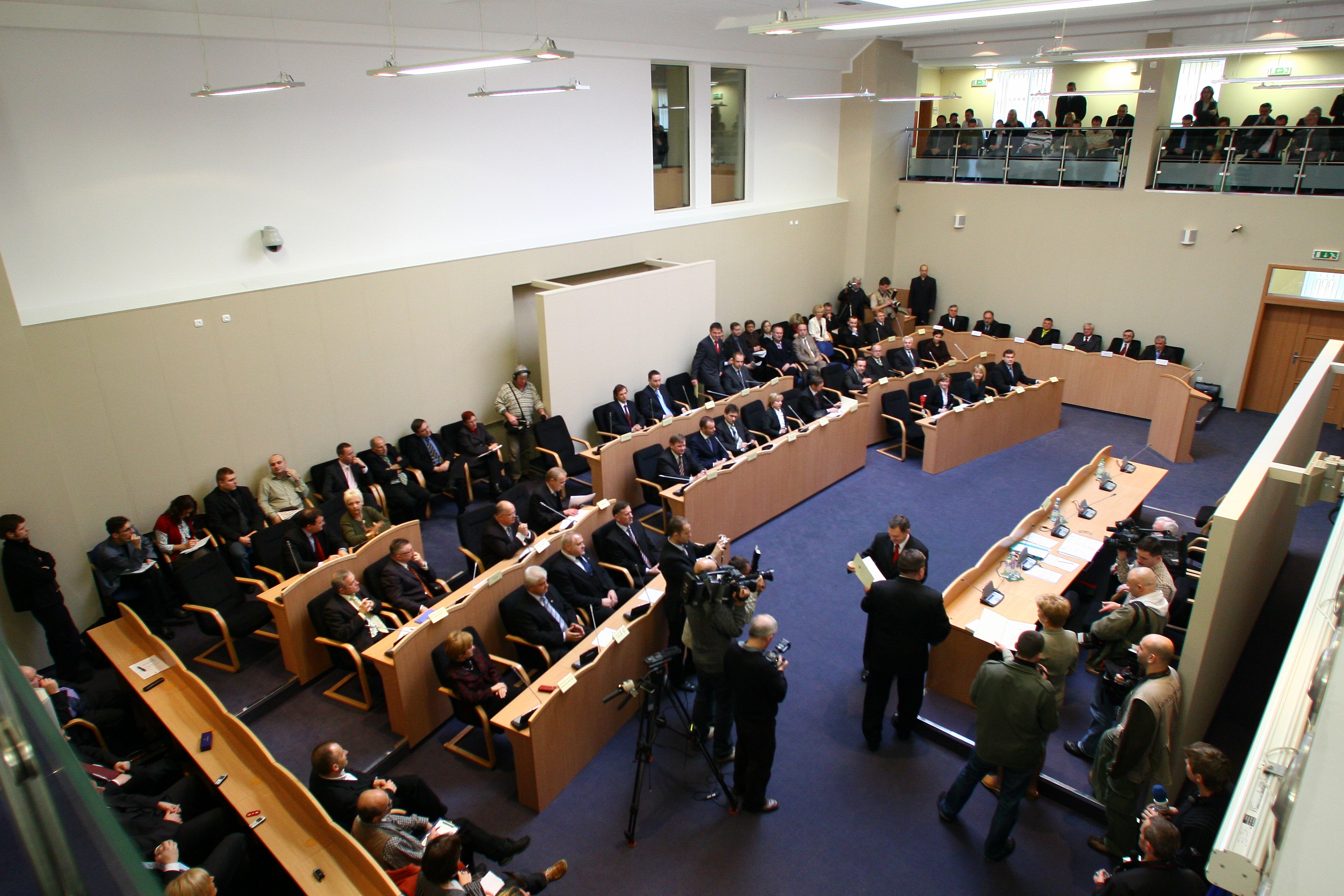
- Sejmik Building, Szczecin

Website
- Official website

The West Pomeranian Voivodeship Sejmik (Polish: Sejmik Województwa Zachodniopomorskiego) is the regional legislature of the Voivodeship of West Pomerania in Poland. It is a unicameral parliamentary body consisting of thirty councillors chosen during regional elections for a five-year term. The current chairperson of the assembly is Teresa Kalina from KO.

The assembly elects the executive board that acts as the collective executive for the provincial government, headed by the voivodeship marshal. The current Executive Board of Pomerania is a coalition government between Civic Coalition, Third Way and The Left under the leadership of Marshal Olgierd Geblewicz of Civic Coalition.

The assembly convenes within the Sejmik Building in Szczecin.

== Districts ==
Members of the legislature are elected from five districts and serve five-year terms. Districts do not have the constituencies' formal names. Instead, each constituency has a number and a territorial description.

Number	Seats	City counties	Land counties
1	8	Szczecin	Police
2	5	Świnoujście	Goleniów, Gryfice, Kamień, Łobez
3	5	None	Białogard, Drawsko, Kołobrzeg, Świdwin, Wałcz
4	5	Koszalin	Koszalin, Sławno, Szczecinek
5	7	None	Choszczno, Gryfino, Myślibórz, Pyrzyce, Stargard

== Election results ==
=== 1998 ===
Party	Mandates
Sojusz Lewicy Demokratycznej	22
Akcja Wyborcza Solidarność	13
Unia Wolności	6
Przymierze Społeczne	3
Ruch Patriotyczny „Ojczyzna”	1
Total	45

=== 2002 ===
Party	Mandates
Sojusz Lewicy Demokratycznej – Unia Pracy	13
Samoobrona Rzeczpospolitej Polskiej	7
Liga Polskich Rodzin	6
Platforma Obywatelska – Prawo i Sprawiedliwość	3
Polskie Stronnictwo Ludowe	1
Total	30

=== 2006 ===
Party	Mandates
Platforma Obywatelska	12
Prawo i Sprawiedliwość	7
Lewica i Demokraci	5
Polskie Stronnictwo Ludowe	3
Samoobrona Rzeczpospolitej Polskiej	3
Total	30

=== 2010 ===
Party	Mandates
Platforma Obywatelska	16
Sojusz Lewicy Demokratycznej	6
Prawo i Sprawiedliwość	5
Polskie Stronnictwo Ludowe	3
Total	30

=== 2014 ===
Party	Mandates
Platforma Obywatelska	12
Polskie Stronnictwo Ludowe	7
Prawo i Sprawiedliwość	6
Sojusz Lewicy Demokratycznej	4
Bezpartyjni Pomorze Zachodnie	1
Total	30

=== 2018 ===
Party	Votes	%	Seats
Platform.Modern Civic Coalition	204,979	32.04	13
Law and Justice	171,439	26.80	11
Nonpartisan Local Government Activists	87,652	13.70	3
Polish People's Party	61,940	9.68	2
SLD Left Together	58,110	9.08	1
Kukiz'15	26,911	4.21	–
Liberty in Local Governments	12,404	1.94	–
Together Party	9,767	1.53	–
National Movement	4,684	0.73	–
The Greens	1,925	0.30	–
Total	639,811	100.00	30
Source: PKW

=== 2024 ===
Party	Votes	%	Seats
Civic Coalition	227,666	38.88	15
Law and Justice	146,687	25.05	10
Third Way	62,147	10.61	3
National Polish Local Government Coalition	49,217	8.41	1
The Left	46,062	7.87	1
Confederation and Nonpartisan Localists	33,065	5.65	–
Normal Country	8,144	1.39	–
Nonpartisan Local Government Activists	6,970	1.19	–
Good of the Gmina	3,499	0.60	–
Liberal Poland – Entrepreneurs' Strike	2,105	0.36	–
Total	585,562	100.00	30
Source: PKW

== See also ==
- Polish Regional Assembly
- West Pomeranian Voivodeship
