= Teresa Kalina =

Polish politician (2014-2018)

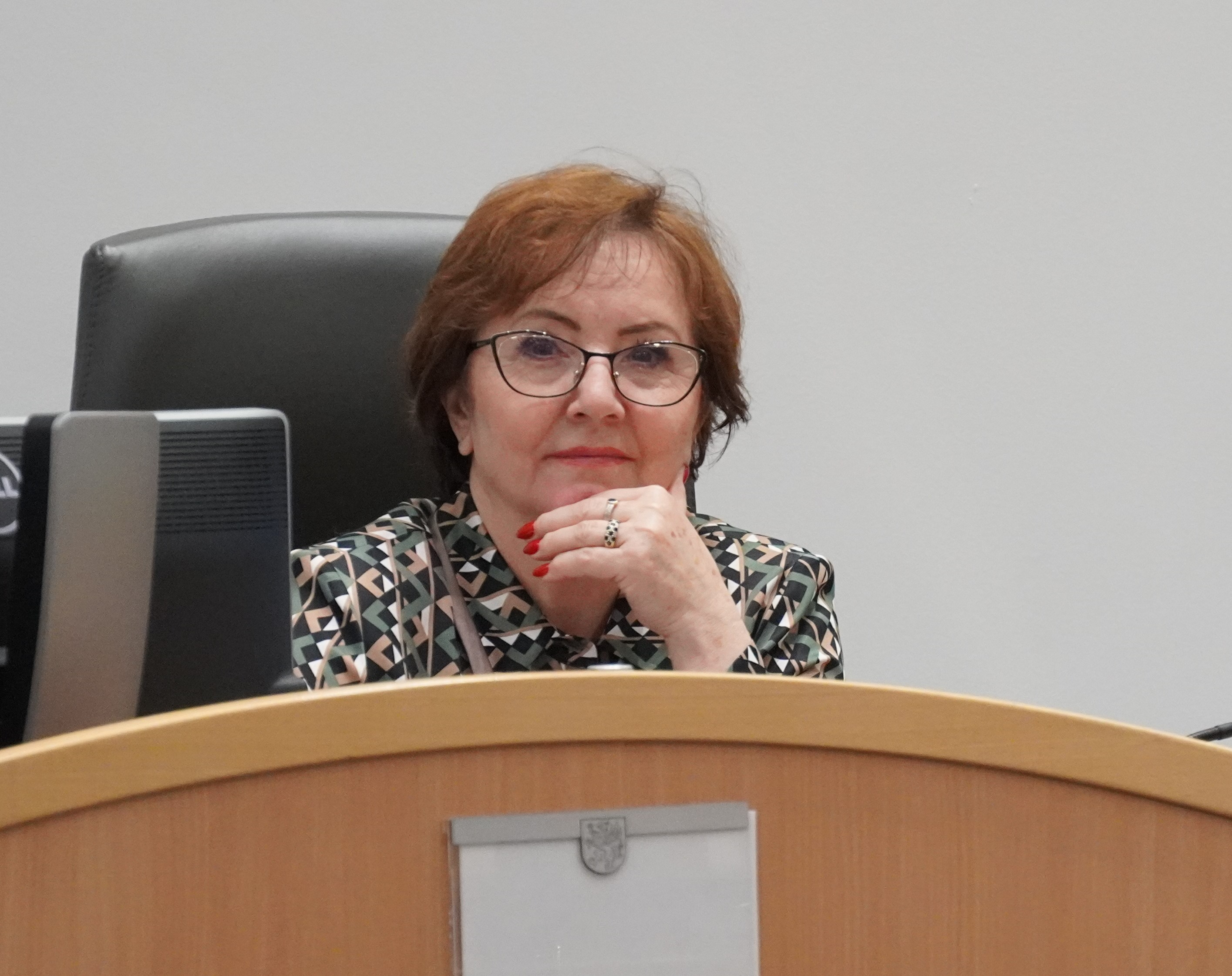
- Teresa Kalina (2022)

Chairman of the West Pomeranian Regional Assembly
- In office 18 March 2014 – 22 November 2018
- Preceded by: Marek Tałasiewicz
- Succeeded by: Maria Ilnicka-Mądry

Personal details
- Born: 7 April 1952 (age 74) Wałcz
- Party: Civic Platform
- Education: Nicolaus Copernicus University in Toruń

Teresa Kalina (born 7 April 1952 in Wałcz) is a Polish politician and history teacher, who from 2014 to 2018 was a chairman of the West Pomeranian Regional Assembly.

== Biography ==
Teresa Kalina was born on 7 April 1952 in Wałcz. She graduated in history from the Nicolaus Copernicus University in Toruń. She also completed postgraduate studies in organization and management at the Higher School of Public Administration in Szczecin and librarianship at the Pedagogical Study of Librarianship. From 1976 she worked as a tutor at the State Orphanage No. 3 in Szczecin, then as a history teacher and librarian. In the years 1991–2004 she was the deputy director of Primary School No. 59, in the years 2004–2006 the headteacher of the Jan Twardowski Junior High School.

== Political career ==
In 2002 she became a member of the Civic Platform. In 2006, on CP's behalf, she was elected a deputy to the Szczecin City Council, obtaining 875 votes. She resigned from the mandate in 2010, because of her appointment as the head of Primary School No. 7.

In the 2010, 2014 and 2018 local government elections she has been elected to the West Pomeranian Regional Assembly. In March 2014, she was appointed chairman of the 4th term of the Assembly in place of Marek Tałasiewicz, and in December of the same year she became the chairman of the 5th term of the Assembly, obtaining 19 of 30 votes. In 2018 she was replaced by Maria Ilnicka-Mądry. In the Assembly, she is a member of Committee on Agriculture and Rural Development, Committee on Development, Promotion and International Cooperation, Committee on Education, Culture and Sport, and The Temporary Commission of the Badge of Honor of the West Pomeranian Griffin. She is also a Vice-chairman of the Committee on Agriculture and Rural Development.

In 2019, she ran for the Sejm without success. She obtained 1955 votes.
