= Bezpartyjni Samorządowcy =

Polish political movement

Nonpartisan Local Government Activists Bezpartyjni Samorządowcy
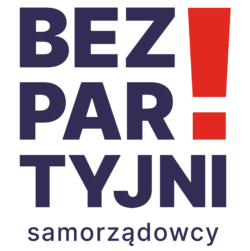
- Abbreviation: BS
- Leader: Marek Woch
- Headquarters: Oleśnica, Lower Silesian Voivodeship
- Ideology: Localism; Conservatism; Regionalism; Federalism; Christian democracy Hard Euroscepticism; Formerly: Pro-Europeanism
- Political position: Right-wing; Formerly: Centre-left
- National affiliation: Broad fire extinguisher front
- Sejm: 0 / 460
- Senate: 0 / 100
- European Parliament: 0 / 53
- Regional Assemblies: 3 / 552

Website
- bezpartyjnisamorzadowcy.pl

Bezpartyjni Samorządowcy (lit. 'Nonpartisan Local Government Activists', BS) is a Polish political movement. Operating mainly at a regional level in a decentralised manner, it participates in elections as a national committee joining the individual regional counterparts. The organisation initially started out in the Lower Silesian Voivodeship before expanding to the rest of the country. The party is a heavily decentralised and federated organisation that fields candidates for local governments, often creating and cooperating with local committees and regional organisations. The BS lacks a central leadership and regional structures. The parties rule themselves separately and autonomously. Bezpartyjni Samorządowcy frequently acts as a minor partner of regional governing coalitions, such as in the voivodeships of Lubuskie and Lower Silesia.

Formerly associated with the liberal wing of Christian democracy, the party advocates for proposals such as free public transport, free lunches for children and abolition of the personal income tax (PIT). The party also advocates for creation of a powerful ecological agency based on the American United States Fish and Wildlife Service, which would protect nature and its resources, prevent pollution environment and combat poaching and illegal hunting. The BS believes that the Polish government became too centralised and became unable to address local concerns; to this end, the party believes that the central government needs MPs who are "local government officials, entrepreneurs and community workers who are not concerned with political lists and agenda". The party opposes "nationalisation" of local politics and warns that this would entail further polarisation of society, along with the erosion of local communities. The BS considers local governments a natural link between citizens and government, and foresees a highly decentralised and federalised Poland.

== History ==
The party originated from a local committee of Robert Raczyński, who first entered Polish politics in 1990 when he became the President of Lubin. The committee was strongly connected to the Party of Christian Democrats, which represented a liberal faction of Christian democracy. In 1998, Raczyński and his committee worked with Solidarity Electoral Action and entered the voivodeship sejmik of Lower Silesia. In 2008, the committee joined the political movement "Poland XXI" founded by Rafał Dutkiewicz and Kazimierz Michał Ujazdowski, but the movement did not contest the 2009 European Parliament election in Poland. In 2009, the movement changed its name to "Civic Lower Silesia", and in 2014 Raczyński and Dutkiewicz parted ways, with the former founding Bezpartyjni Samorządowcy the same year. The party would slowly grow with transfers and defections from parties such as Civic Platform, Polish People's Party and the Democratic Left Alliance, co-governing with these parties in the Lower Silesian Voivodeship and building a strong club in the Lubuskie Voivodeship. In 2017, the party announced a nationwide movement with the ambition to participate in elections nationwide. Bezpartyjni Samorządowcy was joined by the presidents of Szczecin, Zielona Góra and Bolesławiec, along with many minor local officials.

=== Regional political movement (2014–2017) ===
Before the 2014 Polish local elections, some activists of the Citizens' Lower Silesia association opposed to the conclusion of an agreement by its president Rafał Dutkiewicz (Mayor of Wrocław) of an agreement with Civic Platform, set up the committee Bezpartyjni Samorządowcy. It won four seats in the Lower Silesian Voivodeship Sejmik, which were given to: Paweł Kukiz, Robert Raczyński, Aldona Wiktorska-Święcka and Patryk Wild. (who thus gained re-election). However, Robert Raczynski was re-elected mayor of Lubin (running from his own committee) and the seat after him went to Tymoteusz Myrda. Councillors from the BS lists remained independent of the assembly. The BS committee fielded two candidates for mayor (Aldona Wiktorska-Święcka in Wrocław and Wiesław Gierus in Jelenia Góra), but they did not enter the second round. In addition to Robert Raczyński, Piotr Roman in Bolesławiec, who was running from his own committee, remained the mayor of the city from among the BS-related candidates. In the Wrocław council, the only seat for BS went to Sebastian Lorenc.

Paweł Kukiz ran in the 2015 Polish presidential election, coming third with 20.8% of the vote. He then initiated a movement to run in the 2015 Polish parliamentary election (it adopted the name Kukiz'15). In mid-July, however, the BS milieu ended its cooperation with Paweł Kukiz and, together with non-partisan local government activists from other regions and the Civic Movement for Single-Mandate Electoral Districts (also previously supporting Paweł Kukiz) set up the JOW Bezpartyjni committee, which registered candidates in only a few electoral districts (among the signatories of the initiative's programme declaration were BS representatives Robert Raczyński, Piotr Roman, Patryk Wild and Tymoteusz Myrda). Senator Jarosław Obremski, who was associated with this group, set up his own committee and successfully ran for re-election (he was supported by, among others, PiS and Polska Razem). He rejoined the Circle of Independent Senators, but in May 2016 switched to the Law and Justice club. As a result of Paweł Kukiz winning his parliamentary seat, his seat in the assembly was taken by Ewa Zdrojewska.

On 7 March 2016, the group Bezpartyjni Samorządowcy was formed in the Lubusz Voivodeship Sejmik. It was formed by councillors from the Lepsze Lubuskie association. (Sławomir Kowal, chairman of the Łukasz Mejza club, and elected from the PSL list). Józef Kruczkowski, who joined the Law and Justice (PiS) club a year later) together with former SLD councillors. (Edward Fedko and Franciszek Wołowicz).

On 31 March 2016 in the Lower Silesian Sejmik, the ODŚ councillors associated with Rafal Dutkiewicz (Janusz Marszałek, Jerzy Michalak, Marek Obrębalski, Ewa Rzewuska and the Sejmik chairman Paweł Wróblewski) left the Civic Platform club. In addition, other councillors from this party - Michał Bobowiec, vice-chairman of the local assembly Julian Golak, Czesław Kręcichwost, Ryszard Lech and voivodship Marshal Cezary Przybylski - left PO. Together with three councillors elected from BS lists (Tymoteusz Myrda, Patryk Wild and Ewa Zdrojewska), as well as another non-aligned councillor Kazimierz Janik (elected from the SLD Lewica Razem list), they established the club Bezpartyjni Samorządowcy, which became the largest club in the assembly and, in coalition with the Polish People's Party, took over power in the voivodeship, ousting PO from it. Tymoteusz Myrda replaced the party's representative as deputy marshal of the voivodeship. Patryk Wild became the head of the club. Aldona Wiktorska-Święcka, elected from their list, did not join the BS club. On 27 June 2016 there was an expansion of the governing coalition, with Civic Platform and the Democratic Left Alliance (which had been in a joint councillors' club with the PSL for some time). Councillors elected from the BS club then left the BS list (dismissed Deputy Marshal Tymoteusz Myrda, Patryk Wild and Ewa Zdrojewska), who became non-aligned and soon established the Non-Partisan Councillors' Club with former PSL councillor Grażyna Cal and Aldona Wiktorska Święcka, who became the club's chairwoman. On 14 July 2016, the former BS club (with 11 members) took the name Dolnośląski Ruch Samorządowy. A Rafal Dutkiewicz-linked association of this name was also subsequently established.

=== National political movement (2017–2024) ===
On 14 March 2017, the formation of the Local Government Movement "Bezpartyjni" was announced, which was largely a continuation of the JOW Bezpartyjni movement from 2015. The movement, aiming to field a nationwide committee in the 2018 Polish local elections, was co-founded by approximately 60 local government officials from the provinces of Dolnośląskie, Lubuskie, Zachodniopomorskie, Kujawsko-Pomorskie, Podlaskie, Śląskie, Łódzkie and Wielkopolskie. Among others, local government officials who formed committees in the 2014 elections, such as Lower Silesia's Bezpartyjni Samorządowcy, Lepsze Lubuskie and Bezpartyjni Pomorze Zachodnie, which introduced their representatives to the provincial assemblies, came together under the banner of the movement. Among the founders of the 'Bezpartyjni' Local Government Movement were the mayors of Szczecin (Piotr Krzystek), Zielona Góra (Janusz Kubicki), Lubin (Robert Raczyński) and Bolesławiec (Piotr Roman), provincial councillors from the Lower Silesian Sejmiks (from the then Non-Partisan Councillors' Club), Lubuskie (from the LL-linked club Bezpartyjni Samorządowcy) and Zachodniopomorskie (councillor from the BPZ list), the mayor of Scinawa, the chairman of the municipal councils of Szczecin (Jan Stopyra) and Augustów, and Patryk Hałaczkiewicz from JOW.

In the 2018 elections, the BS committee registered lists for sejmiks in all provinces, gaining (as one of 10 committees) nationwide recognition. BS's assembly lists appeared in 62 out of 85 constituencies. A smaller number of lists were fielded by the committee in elections to individual types of councils. BS also fielded several candidates each for mayors, mayors and aldermen. Some candidates associated with the movement also ran under the names of local committees. In the Lower Silesian Voivodeship, Bezpartyjni Samorządowcy joined forces with DRS (but without Rafał Dutkiewicz's closest associates, who set up the Z Dutkiewiczem dla Dolnego Śląska committee in the local government elections), with which they formed a joint club of BS councillors in the local government in June the same year, led by Czesław Kręcichwost (numbering 12 at the end of the term and being the largest club in the local government). In Mazovian Voivodeship, the association Mazowiecka Wspólnota Samorządowa (running since 2002 in every local government election - including in 2002 as part of Social Initiative Wspólnota Samorządowa and in 2010 as part of Krajowa Wspólnota Samorządowa) ran under the BS name. On the other hand, in the Opolskie Voivodeship, the BS, as part of an agreement with the local association Przyjazny Samorząd Powiatu Namysłowskiego, registered one list in the assembly elections (thus gaining the rights of a nationwide committee).

In the elections to the Sejmiks, BS obtained 5.28% nationally, in five voivodeships exceeding the electoral threshold and winning seats (15 in total). In the Lower Silesian Voivodship, they obtained 14.98% of the votes, winning six seats. As a result of their decision, PiS came to power in this voivodeship, in coalition with which Cezary Przybylski of BS retained his seat as marshal of the voivodeship. In the West Pomeranian voivodeship, BS received 13.7% of the vote. They did not enter the Voivodeship Assembly, but supported Marshal Olgierd Geblewicz from the Civic Platform, and their representative Maria Ilnicka-Mądry became the chairwoman of the Sejmik. They also managed to establish their own club in Lubuskie, where, with a result of 13.17%, they won four seats (however, the councillor Wioleta Haręźlak, elected from their list, joined the PSL club, becoming the head of the assembly). The BS found themselves in opposition there, as in Mazovia and Greater Poland, where their committee won just over 6% of the vote and its representatives won one seat each. The BS KWW won two mayoral and one mayoral positions, as well as 36 seats in county councils, 53 in borough councils and onen in Warsaw district councils. However, candidates affiliated with the movement also ran under other committee names - among them were city mayors who won re-election: movement leader Robert Raczynski, as well as Piotr Krzystek, Janusz Kubicki and Piotr Roman.

On 2 March 2019, some of the movement's activists together with economist and lawyer Robert Gwiazdowski founded the political movement Polska Fair Play, which dissociated from BS leader Robert Raczyński.) The PFP ran in the 2019 European Parliament election in Poland, but registered lists in only part of the districts. After the elections it ceased its activities.

Bezpartyjni Samorządowcy declared to run independently in the 2019 Polish parliamentary election (after the PSL and Kukiz'15 failed to agree on a joint start with them). They entered the elections as KWW Koalicja Bezpartyjni i Samorządowcy, registering lists for the Sejm in 19 out of 41 constituencies, as well as 15 candidates for the Senate (out of 100 constituencies). The committee's lists included the Federation for the Republic, whose leader, non-aligned MP Marek Jakubiak, opened the Kraków list for the Sejm. In turn, Gniewomir Rokosz-Kuczyński of Christian Democracy of the 3rd Polish Republic ran from second place there. The list in the Siedlce district was opened by former MEP and Biala Governor Marek Czarnecki, while the list leader in the Elbląg district was former MP Wojciech Penkalski. Candidates for the Senate included the leader of RO na rzecz JOW Patryk Hałaczkiewicz, or Świętokrzyskie academics - political scientist Kazimierz Kik and former policeman Dariusz Loranty. The West Pomeranian Non-Partisans factions did not decide to run in the election. Non-partisans from the Lubuskie Voivodeship, however, joined the Polish Coalition, and as a result, Łukasz Mejza (formerly active in Poland Fair Play) found himself in the Sejm elections in last place on the PSL list there. He lost his seat to list leader Jolanta Fedak, after whose death a few months later he replaced her in the Sejm, becoming a non-attached MP; in 2021, as a non-attached MP, he joined the co-governing Republican Party). KWW KBiS received 0.78% of the vote in the elections to the Sejm (taking 6th place, as the strongest non-national committee), exceeding 3% in the Wrocław and Wałbrzych districts. In the Senate elections also no KBiS candidate won a seat. Nationally, they received 1.82% of the vote (fifth result among all committees). In 2022, the party formed a ruling coalition together with the Democratic Left Alliance in the Lubusz Voivodeship Sejmik.

=== Leadership of Marek Woch (2024–present) ===
On 25 October 2024, at the national congress of OF "BiS" delegates, Marek Woch was selected as the new chairman of the party. A year later, on 20 September 2025, it held a unification congress with the Labour Party (chaired by Zbigniew Wrzesiński), National Camp (Marcin Makowski), Kornel Morawiecki Institute of Thought (Maciej Lisowski) and the Republicans (Adam Tomasz Drozd).

In the 2025 Polish presidential election, Woch became a presidential candidate. He postulated expanding the competences of Polish president, abolishing the Social Insurance Institution and the National Health Fund, and establishing a tribunal to investigate the possible mishandling of the COVID-19 pandemic by the Polish government. He has spoken against abortion, in vitro fertilization, and the European Union, particularly criticizing the EU's migration policy and the European Green Deal. Woch was endorsed by an anti-Ukrainian and anti-American Camp of Great Poland, as well as the Slavic Union.

Woch has been described as right-wing, and pro-Russian. On 18 April 2025, Bezpartyjni Samorządowcy declared on their social media that Woch is not the party's candidate and does not represent the party's views. It turned out that the declaration was made by the Lower Silesian faction of Bezpartyjni Samorządowcy associated with Robert Raczyński; the party started as a grouping of Lower Silesian politicians before becoming a nationwide movement. As a result, the faction was expelled from the party.

Ultimately, Woch finished last, winning 18,338 votes which amounted to 0.09% of the popular vote. In the runoff, he endorsed the candidate supported by Law and Justice, Karol Nawrocki.

In October 2025, Woch announced that Bezpartyjni Samorządowcy would form a joint list for the Senate in the 2027 parliamentary election together with the Confederation of the Polish Crown of Grzegorz Braun. Woch also declared that Bezpartyjni Samorządowcy have become a part of a broader movement built by Braun, the Broad fire extinguisher front. The party marched with the KKP at the 11 November 2025 Independence March, and Woch professed support for Polish withdrawal from the European Union. In February 2026, Woch declared that Bezpartyjni Samorządowcy are a centre-right party willing to work with Law and Justice, Confederation Liberty and Independence, Confederation of the Polish Crown, and Szymon Hołownia.

=== Election history ===
==== 2014 local elections ====
The BS Committee won four seats in the Lower Silesian Voivodeship. Party chairman Robert Raczyński was re-elected as president of Lubin (again starting from his own committee). In addition to Robert Raczyński, the president of the city from among candidates associated with BS, member Piotr Roman was also elected in Bolesławiec. In the Wrocław city council, the only seat for the BS was won by Sebastian Lorenc.

==== 2018 local elections ====
In the elections in 2018 to regional assemblies, BS gained 5.28% of the vote and won 15 seats in five voivodeships. In the Lower Silesian Voivodeship, they obtained 14.98% of votes, gaining six seats. As a result of their decision, PiS came to power in this voivodeship in which BS member Cezary Przybylski maintained the seat of the voivodeship marshal. In the West Pomeranian Voivodeship, BS obtained 13.7% of votes. They did not enter the voivodeship board, however, and supported the PO, with their member Maria Ilnicka-Mądry becoming the president of the regional council. BS managed to establish their own club in the Lubusz Regional Assembly, where they scored four seats on the result of 13.17% of the vote (however, the councilor Wioleta Haręźlak, who was elected from their list, eventually left and joined the PSL, becoming the chairman of the regional council). BS found themselves in opposition in Masovian Voivodeship and Greater Poland Voivodeship, where their committee gained slightly more than 6% of votes, and its representatives obtained one seat each. BS has won two mayoral seats and one sheriff seat, as well as 36 seats in county councils, 53 in municipal councils, and one in a district of Warsaw. Candidates associated with the movement also ran under other committees' names in some instances—among them are some presidents of cities who obtained re-election: the leader of the movement, Robert Raczyński, as well as Piotr Krzystek, Janusz Kubicki and Piotr Roman.

==== 2023 parliamentary election ====
For the 2023 Polish parliamentary election, the party presented its election program at a convention held in mid-July. A proposal considered to especially distinguish the party from others is the introduction of free bus and rail transport throughout the country. Other proposals include zero PIT tax for everyone and not just up to the age of 26, free healthy lunches for all schoolchildren, an Education Development Voucher, i.e. PLN 100 per month for each primary and secondary school pupil to be used for educational and developmental activities, shortening queues to doctors, improving the quality of psychological and psychiatric care for children and young people, and facilities for families.

The party attacked the 2023 Polish referendum planned by the United Right government, considering it politicized and in many ways mimicking the rhetoric of the main opposition party, the Civic Coalition. Bezpartyjni Samorządowcy proposed to replace referendum questions with ones unrelated to immigration or privatization - the party advocated for a referendum on "free and healthy lunches for children in primary schools", free regional railway transport and abolishion of the PIT tax. The vice-president of the party, Grzegorz Kulawinek, stated: "This referendum and the proposed questions raise our concerns. We actually already know the answers to these four questions. The idea behind this referendum is first and foremost to mobilise Law and Justice voters to take part in the elections".

In September 2023, Non-Partisan Local Government Activists announced that they had now become a nationwide committee and registered lists in the 2023 Polish parliamentary election to the Sejm in all 41 electoral districts, as well as fielding candidates for Senate seats as well. The party managed to acquire 300.000 signatures for their electoral lists in total. Main demands of the party for the upcoming 2023 elections are 'free healthy school meals for children', the introduction of 'zero PIT for all citizens', free public and regional transport and an increase in funding for child psychiatry.

Ultimately the party failed to cross the 5% electoral threshold, winning 401,054 votes in total, which amounted to 1.86% of the popular vote. Even Krzysztof Maj, the party candidate who represented the party during Telewizja Polska debates, failed to win enough votes to gain a seat. The party also failed to cross the 3% threshold, which would have enabled them to receive a parliamentary subsidy to continue their political activities. Polish television station TVN called the result "a resounding defeat" for the party. The party performed better in the Senate election, winning over 1 million votes or 4.91% of popular vote; nevertheless, the party failed to win any Senate seats.

==== 2024 local elections ====
For the 2024 Polish local elections, the party registered its own electoral committee on 1 February 2024. However, 11 days later, on 12 February 2024, a far-right party Confederation registered its own committee for the elections, named "Electoral Committee for Confederation and Bezpartyjni Samorządowcy", implying that the two parties formed a coalition. Soon after, the leader of Confederation, Krzysztof Bosak, claimed to have formed a coalition with the BS.

On 17 February, the party leadership of BS stated: "There is no coalition of Bezpartyjni Samorządowcy with the Confederation. The Confederation stole our name because they know they are doomed to defeat in the local elections." The party accused the Confederation of deliberately misleading voters by adding their party's name to their electoral committee. The party subsequently filed a lawsuit against Confederation and its electoral committee.

Ultimately, the situation revealed a split in the party, as numerous activists of Bezpartyjni Samorządowcy, including its candidate from the 2023 election, did join the coalition with Konfederacja. Ultimately, the party's lawsuit failed. In the election, Bezpartyjni Samorządowcy lost 50% of its electorate and 75% of its voivodeship seats. This failure was attributted to the confusion created by both the party and Konfederacja claiming the name of "Bezpartyjni Samorządowcy".

==== 2024 European election ====
In October 2024, Marek Woch became the leader of Bezpartyjni Samorządowcy and started the party's cooperation with the party KORWiN of Janusz Korwin-Mikke. In the 2024 European Parliament election in Poland, the party created an electoral committee Bezpartyjni Samorządowcy – Normalna Polska w Normalnej Europie (Polish: Bezpartyjni Samorządowcy - Normal Poland in Normal Europe) together with KORWiN. The committee opposed the European Union's New Pact on Migration and Asylum and stressed the need to restore the sovereignty of member states against central dictates of the EU. It won 108,926 votes, which amounted to 0.93% of the popular vote and was not sufficient to win any seats.

== Election results ==
=== Presidential ===
Election year	Candidate	1st round		2nd round	
Election year	Candidate	Votes	%	Votes	%
2025	Marek Woch	18,338	0.09 (#13)	Endorsed Karol Nawrocki	

=== Sejm ===
Election	Leader	Votes	%	Seats	+/−	Government
2019	Robert Raczyński	144.773	0.78 (#6)	0 / 460	New	Extra-parliamentary
2023	Robert Raczyński	401.054	1.86 (#6)	0 / 460	0	Extra-parliamentary

=== Senate ===
Election	Votes	%	Seats	+/−	Government
2019	331,385	1.82 (#6)	0 / 460	New	Extra-parliamentary
2023	1,049,919	4.91 (#6)	0 / 460	0	Extra-parliamentary

=== European Parliament ===
Election	Leader	Votes	%	Seats	+/−	EP Group
2024	Marek Woch	108,926	0.93 (#6)	0 / 53	New	−

=== Regional assemblies ===
Election	Votes	%	Seats	+/−
2014	101,416	0.85 (#7)	4 / 555	▲4
2018	814,651	5.28 (#6)	15 / 552	▲11
2024	434,086	3.01 (#6)	3 / 552	▼12

== Ideology ==
In the mid-2010s, the party was associated with political right but denied this label. The party presented one of its prominent members, Janusz Kubicki, associated with left-wing politics and the Civic Platform, as proof that it is not aligned with the right-wing Law and Justice Party. The party also touted its local coalition with The Left in Lower Silesia and many defectors from left-wing parties in its ranks. In 2023, the party stated that it "disagrees with PiS on ideological and world-view issues", and formed a local coalition with the Civic Platform in Lubusz Voivodeship. However, OKO.press characterized the party as right-wing, arguing that "although they claim to be nonpartisan, the views of leading activists of Bezpartyjni Samorządowcy are decidedly closer to those of the right."

In 2020, a survey by a sociology journal Studia Socjologiczne found that amongst the voters of Bezpartyjni Samorządowcy, 33% identified as left-wing, 41% as centrist, and 26% as right-wing. This result was very similar to that of the Polish People's Party, in which case 35% of its voters identified as left-wing, 37% as centrist, and 28% as right-wing, respectively. Since 2026, the party came to be described as right-wing.

=== Early ideology ===
In 2021, a prominent member of the party, Mirosław Lubiński, who became the new leader of the Bezpartyjni Samorządowcy club in the Lower Silesian Regional Assembly, stated that he had always associated himself and his party with the political left, but "not the one with Czarzasty and Biedroń". Mirosława Winnicka, one of the party's candidates in the 2023 election, also described herself as leftist and argued that most people in the party are likewise left-wing, making her "no stranger to this environment".

When asked about the ideological differences between Bezpartyjni Samorządowcy and the New Left, Winnicka stated: "It is a political party, and not the kind of left-wing party I associate with the SLD. The people owe it to the Alliance to bring Poland into NATO, into the EU, to ensure democratic standards. The current New Left is something completely different, not least because it does not have this measure of achievement. This grouping has lost its credibility and distinctiveness. I think that a lot of bad things for the left side of the political scene started with Leszek Miller's association with Samoobrona and finding a candidate for the Polish presidency in the person of Ms Ogórek. At some point, the SLD's top leadership 'found' a patent on knowledge and stopped listening to their environment - the political base. It then became clear that this was the end of the left."

=== Shift to the right ===
Since 2024, Bezpartyjni Samorządowcy have increasingly aligned themselves with the Polish far-right. In the 2024 Polish local elections, they fielded a prominent far-right politician, Janusz Korwin-Mikke, on its electoral lists. In the same local elections, the party seemingly joined an electoral alliance with the far-right Konfederacja party, although the party itself denied this and accused Konfederacja of stealing the party's name. It turned out that there had been a split within the party, as many prominent members of Bezpartyjni Samorządowcy did endorse the alliance with Konfederacja. In 2025, Polish political scientist Anna Ryx stated that the party's program has notable conservative influence. In 2026, Gazeta Wyborcza described the party as right-wing.

In October 2024, Marek Woch was elected the party's leader. Considered a right-wing politician, Woch had solidified the party's shift to the right by forming an alliance with Korwin-Mikke's party KORWiN, and organizing a joint list with it for the 2024 European Parliament election in Poland. When Woch became the party's candidate for the 2025 Polish presidential election, the Lower Silesian faction opposed to Woch denounced him; the faction was subsequently expelled from the party. Woch endorsed Karol Nawrocki, the candidate supported by the right-wing Law and Justice, in the run-off. Later in 2025, the party entered an alliance with Grzegorz Braun and his Broad fire extinguisher front, and by 2026, Woch declared that Bezpartyjni Samorządowcy are a centre-right party open to cooperation with fellow Polish right-wing movements. This marked a clear shift from the party's 2018 declaration, in which it protested the right-wing label and pointed to the presence of numerous left-wing members in its ranks.

== Program ==
The party defines regionalism as its main ideology, stating that their current priority is the development of each region, with local politics being valued over the national ones. The party was pro-European, believing that cooperation with the European Union as well as the EU Development Funds are crucial to the welfare of Polish regions and local governments. However, since Woch's election as party leader in 2024, the party had since embraced anti-EU postulates, demanding Polexit. It is also considered pro-Russian. The party presents decentralization as its main postulate, believing that a real democracy can only be a decentralised and localised one; members of the party argue that empowering local governments at expense of the national government could lead to a stronger state, rather than centralization.

=== Territorial policies ===
The party wants to reform the Polish electoral law, arguing that it only serves political parties while heavily marginalizing social movements, local movements and associations, that are effectively excluded from the central government. Bezpartyjni Samorządowcy wants to "create the opportunity for social movements, associations to have an open path to parliament". The party places the decentralisation and federalisation of Poland as its highest priority, arguing that the "local government is what the nation is, reflecting its strengths, weaknesses, habits and character"; BS argues that empowering local governments is necessary to increase social participation in political processes and to ensure that local needs are addressed adequately. The movement condemns national parties for spreading the national polarisation into local politics as well, often resulting in political deadlocks and ineffective leadership, at the expense of regional parties that would place their region over the party. The movement believes that the local government is increasingly subordinated to the authorities, losing its competences and this process is exacerbated by the state's centralisation policy. The party wants to enhance and clarify financial income of local governments and increase empowerment of every local government.

According to the movement, local governments should play a primary role in shaping European policies and in international cooperation, both at the local and national level. The party alludes to the Catholic principle of subsidiarity and envisions a decentralised Sejm which would be composed of regional government officials rather than national ones, and to have national policies be dictated by regional needs as well. To this end, the party wants to replace the D'Hondt method with the Sainte-Laguë method, arguing that D'Hondt tends to disadvantage small parties in favour of large ones; in case of the Sainte-Laguë method, local parties would be able to gain representation at a national level as well.

=== Social issues ===
Bezpartyjni Samorządowcy take socially conservative stances on social issues. They postulate the need to increase the birth rate in Poland, and argue that "the well-being of the family is a prerequisite for the development of Polish society, which should prompt the authorities to take measures ensuring that everyone is free to decide, under comfortable conditions, whether to have children". It argues that the parents' right to raise their children in line with their beliefs must be guaranteed, stating that teachers and educational institutions must allow the upbringing process to be the choice of the parents. Marek Woch, the party's leader since 2024, has stated his opposition to abortion and in vitro fertilization.

=== Economic issues ===
The party postulates an expansion of social assistance programs for families and small businesses. It calls for free municipal and city transport, which it considers a "safe, beneficial and resident-friendly solution", necessary to lower greenhouse emissions and ensure a longer lifespan of road infrastructure. The movement believes that many rural areas of Poland currently suffer from "transport exclusion", which needs to be solved by providing balanced funding to the local governments that would then be used to expand infrastructure. According to the movement's program, the competences of local governments should be extended to bus transport, arguing that the few transport lines which can operate on a commercial basis are being destroyed by unfair competition practices. Therefore, party argues that devolving the administration of local infrastructure to regional governments is necessary not only to combat transport exclusion, but to help break up monopolies as well.

In regards to healthcare, the movements wants to implement a "subsidiarity-based concept of healthcare", in which decisions on treatment should be made as close as possible to the citizen in order to maintain greater control over the flow of funds; the party wants to introduce the decentralisation of the health care financing system by giving competence and responsibility for financing services to the provincial governments. The movement advocates for a single-payer system that would include a nationwide pay program that would build a national and universal healthcare structure. The party is critical of the current medicine reimbursement system in Poland, criticising it as too unclear and discriminatory against the poorest groups; the party wants a wider social net that would make a great pool of medicine cost-free.

Bezpartyjni Samorządowcy also proposed a turnover tax for large and international corporations, arguing that big business is able to pay little or no taxes in Poland. The party believes that a new tax on corporations is necessary to reduce the personal income tax rate that individual citizens pay. Additionally, the party wants to use the tax to fund local governments, arguing that they are severely underfunded. Łukasz Pająk, one of the party's electoral candidates, stated in September 2023:

Local authorities in Poland today are severely cut off from funding, and as a result they are largely unable to carry out the basic tasks for which they are intended. If you see how much money local authorities are spending, for example on education, on maintaining schools, on paying teachers, and so on, you will see that the education subsidy which the state treasury allocates actually covers these costs only to a very small extent. This is because it is the state that has a duty to maintain schools, and it is shifting this duty onto local authorities, to whom it does not give enough money. As a result, local authorities have to use the money they raise themselves through various local taxes to spend this money, and then there is no money to repair roads, to modernise, for example schools, buildings, or to build new social housing. (...) I can guarantee that when we enter Parliament as Bezpartyjni Samorządowcy, we will aim to tax large and multinational corporations, precisely by introducing an income tax, also known as a turnover tax.

The party also included ecological proposals in its program, proposing the creation of a nationwide ecology service based on the American U.S. Fish and Wildlife Service that would be responsible for protection of nature and its resources (property), counteracting environmental pollution, combating poaching, combating offences in the area of nature protection and environmental pollution, controlling the legality of purchase and trade (including cross-border trade) in game and fish, controlling the entrepreneurs conducting economic activity in the area of trade in live animals, fish and trade in game and fish carcasses, controlling compliance with regulations and enforcing obligations in the area of waste management and water and sewage management and rescuing stray animals. The movement also advocates for a water management system which would function as a complement to the management dictated by the administrative division. According to the party, as the level of water in rivers and reservoirs in Poland is declining, a development of the so-called small retention system is needed, including protection of marshes or wetlands.

=== Agriculture ===
The party proposed a package of policies aimed at helping Polish farmers. It proposed allowing the sale of agricultural products in rest areas along highways and expressways. It postulated combating drought by increasing water retention through the use of post-mining depressions and expanding the weather monitor depression. It also proposed protectionist policies to combat price speculation and a system of state-guaranteed prices. It postulated a creation of a deposit system under which grain imported from Ukraine would be subject to a refundable deposit; the importer would recover it after transporting the grain outside the territory of Poland. The party also proposed to introduce special support packages for farmers such as higher subsidies and financial assistance in establishing businesses.

=== Foreign policy ===
In 2023, regarding the European Union, the party stated that they "are Euro-enthusiasts, but also Euro-realists." The party opposes European federation and argues that federalization will further empower dominating states of the EU at expense of weaker ones. The BS also stated its opposition to forced relocation of migrants, creation of a European army and introduction of the euro in Poland, believing that by doing so, Poland would "lose total control over the conduct of its own monetary policy". In regards to the climate policy of the Union, Bezpartyjni Samorządowcy stated that while they support achieving climate neutrality, they want the EU to aid its poorer countries with "energy security and energy self-reliance" instead of "top-down imposed deadlines". Similarly to its view on Poland, BS believes that the European Union should be more decentralized and be oriented around regions rather than centralized states. The party also supports Ukraine's entry into the European Union.

The movement presented a liberal stance on immigration, advocating for open borders and state programs that would help immigrants integrate themselves into Polish society; the party foresees simplified procedures related to legal residence in Poland, specifically through translation of documents into different languages. The party also advocates for welfare programs that would assist foreigners in finding accommodation and jobs in Poland, as well as special providing tax and accounting advice that would help immigrants integrate into the local tax systems. The BS argue that "a rational systemic and educational basis must be prepared to prepare the country and its citizens for so-called economic emigration". The party welcomes immigrants, arguing that the inclusion of foreigners in the economic and social system will allow them to make a significant economical contribution to the development of the country.

In 2024, Marek Woch was elected the leader of the party, reshaping the party's view on foreign policy. Woch postulates Polish withdrawal from the European Union, and has been described as pro-Russian.
