= JOW Bezpartyjni =

- Founded: July 2015
- Dissolved: October 2015
- Split from: Kukiz'15 (Note: JOW Bezpartyjni split from Paweł Kukiz during his organization of Kukiz'15)
- Succeeded by: Bezpartyjni Samorządowcy
- Ideology: Pro-single-seat constituencies Decentralization

Website
- jowbezpartyjni.pl

JOW Bezpartyjni (lit. 'JOW Non-Partisans') was an electoral committee contesting the 2015 Polish parliamentary election.

== History ==
The committee was registered by former organizers of Paweł Kukiz's 2015 presidential election campaign that did not agree with the organization of Kukiz's committee to the Sejm, Kukiz'15. Their cooperation with Kukiz ended in July 2015, when they decided to organize their own parliamentary election campaign. Initially, the electoral committee was to be called "Bezpartyjni.org". The initiative was cofounded by members of the Lower Silesian Bezpartyjni Samorządowcy (BS) and the Citizens' Movement for Single-Member Constituencies (RO JOW). The declaration of the movement was signed by 29 activists, such as Robert Raczyński (mayor of Lubin, BS), Piotr Roman (mayor of Bolesławiec, BS), Konrad Rytel (vice-mayor of Piastów and chairman of the Mazovian Self-Governance Community), Patryk Wild and Tymoteusz Myrda (members of the Lower Silesian Voivodeship Sejmik, BS), Patryk Hałaczkiewicz (key member of RO JOW and former chief of staff of Paweł Kukiz's presidential campaign), Antoni Kamiński (expert of RO JOW), Elżbieta Hibner (activist of "Łódź Without Parties"), Łukasz Mejza (member of the Lubusz Voivodeship Sejmik of the Better Lubusz party), Piotr Guział (member of the Warsaw City Council, and former mayor of Ursynów, chairman of the Warsaw Self-Governance Community) and Marek Ciesielczyk (member of the Tarnów City Council, co-chairman of the Oburzeni association).

JOW Bezpartyjni registered in 10 of 41 electoral constituencies to the Sejm and 6 of 100 constituencies to the Senat. Placed first on the party lists were activists such as Patryk Wild, Andrzej Aumiller (former MP and member of construction, activist of the Party of Retirees and Pensioners RP – only person on the lists of JOW Bezpartyjni declaring as a member of party) and Wojciech Penkalski (independent MP, formerly member of Ruch Palikota). Among candidates of JOW Bezpartyjni, besides its founders, were also speed skater Natalia Czerwonka, handball player Kaja Załęczna, footballer Zbigniew Zakrzewski and economist Andrzej Hordyj. However, the committee ran into difficulties: due to not registering a nationwide electoral committee, some candidates were forced not to run (ex. Patryk Wild), and some lists were crossed out, such as in Legnica (where Natalia Czerwonka and Kaja Załęczna contested) and Białystok. In Elbląg constituency, there was only the minimal amount of 8 candidates on the electoral list of JOW Bezpartyjni. Wojciech Penkalski also stood down from the election before it occurred.

== Program ==
The electoral program of JOW Bezpartyji was called the New Social Contract. It postulated the creation of 460 single-member constituencies in elections to the Sejm, debureaucratization of institutions and education, decentralization of state administration and public finances, simplification and reduction of taxes.

== Election results ==
In elections to the Sejm, the committee took 12th place, with 0.1% of the vote. In elections to the Senate, it took 8th place, with 0.8% of the vote.

== Aftermath ==
On 14 March 2017, JOW Bezpartyjni was de facto reactivated as part of the Local Government Movement "Bezpartyjni". The Movement organized as Bezpartyjni Samorządowcy for the 2018 local elections.
