= List of Law and Justice politicians =

A list of notable Polish politicians of the Law and Justice Party (Polish: Prawo i Sprawiedliwość).

== A ==
- Andrzej Adamczyk
- Waldemar Andzel

== B ==
- Małgorzata Bartyzel
- Ryszard Bender
- Adam Bielan
- Jerzy Bielecki
- Jacek Bogucki
- Anna Borucka-Cieślewicz
- Wojciech Borzuchowski
- Bogusław Bosak
- Joachim Brudziński
- Barbara Bubula
- Alfred Budner
- Mariusz Błaszczak

== C ==
- Teresa Ceglecka-Zielonka
- Józef Cepil
- Zbigniew Chmielowiec
- Daniela Chrapkiewicz
- Aleksander Chłopek
- Edward Ciągło
- Piotr Cybulski
- Tadeusz Cymański
- Ryszard Czarnecki
- Witold Czarnecki
- Arkadiusz Czartoryski
- Roman Czepe
- Edward Czesak

== D ==
- Andrzej Mikołaj Dera
- Andrzej Diakonow
- Zbigniew Dolata
- Ludwik Dorn
- Marzenna Drab
- Tomasz Dudziński
- Lena Dąbkowska-Cichocka

== F ==
- Jacek Falfus
- Janina Fetlińska
- Hanna Foltyn-Kubicka
- Józef Fortuna
- Anna Fotyga

== G ==
- Karolina Gajewska
- Grażyna Gęsicka
- Zyta Gilowska
- Zbigniew Girzyński
- Szymon Giżyński
- Adam Glapiński
- Piotr Gliński
- Mieczysław Golba
- Marian Goliński
- Małgorzata Gosiewska
- Jerzy Gosiewski
- Przemysław Gosiewski
- Kazimierz Gołojuch
- Marek Gróbarczyk
- Artur Górski
- Tomasz Górski
- Marcin Gugulski

== H ==
- Kazimierz Hajda
- Czesław Hoc
- Zbigniew Hoffmann
- Adam Hofman

== J ==
- Michał Jach
- Dawid Jackiewicz
- Jarosław Jagiełło
- Elżbieta Jakubiak
- Grzegorz Janik
- Mieczysław Janowski
- Wojciech Jasiński
- Kazimierz Jaworski
- Marek Jurek
- Krzysztof Jurgiel
- Jędrzej Jędrych

== K ==
- Janusz Kaczmarek
- Filip Kaczyński
- Jarosław Kaczyński
- Lech Kaczyński
- Ryszard Kaczyński
- Mariusz Kamiński
- Michał Kamiński
- Lucjan Karasiewicz
- Stanisław Karczewski
- Karol Karski
- Jan Józef Kasprzyk
- Beata Kempa
- Wiesław Kilian
- Izabela Kloc
- Joanna Kluzik-Rostkowska
- Stanisław Kogut
- Andrzej Kosztowniak
- Paweł Kowal
- Henryk Kowalczyk
- Bogusław Kowalski
- Zbigniew Kozak
- Lech Kołakowski
- Robert Kołakowski
- Jacek Kościelniak
- Maks Kraczkowski
- Leonard Krasulski
- Elżbieta Kruk
- Urszula Krupa
- Piotr Krzywicki
- Marek Kuchciński
- Anna Kurska
- Jacek Kurski
- Zbigniew Kuźmiuk
- Sławomir Kłosowski

== L ==
- Jarosław Lasecki
- Tomasz Latos
- Ryszard Legutko
- Jan Filip Libicki
- Marcin Libicki
- Krzysztof Lipiec
- Adam Lipiński
- Andrzej Liss
- Alojzy Lysko

== M ==
- Krzysztof Maciejewski
- Antoni Macierewicz
- Tadeusz Madziarczyk
- Ewa Malik
- Kazimierz Marcinkiewicz
- Barbara Marianowska
- Tomasz Markowski
- Gabriela Masłowska
- Mirosława Masłowska
- Dariusz Matecki
- Jerzy Materna
- Marek Matuszewski
- Kazimierz Matuszny
- Beata Mazurek
- Andrzej Mańka
- Tomasz Merta
- Krzysztof Michałkiewicz
- Hanna Mierzejewska
- Marek Migalski
- Krzysztof Mikuła
- Mirosław Milewski
- Wojciech Mojzesowicz
- Halina Molka
- Kazimierz Moskal
- Arkadiusz Mularczyk
- Marek Muszyński
- Antoni Mężydło
- Henryk Młynarczyk

== N ==
- Aleksandra Natalli-Świat
- Szymon Niemiec
- Maria Nowak
- Ryszard Nowak

== O ==
- Stanisława Okularczyk
- Halina Olendzka
- Dariusz Olszewski
- Marek Opioła
- Jan Ołdakowski

== P ==
- Anna Pakuła-Sacharczuk
- Anna Paluch
- Stefan Pastuszewski
- Bolesław Piecha
- Mirosław Piotrowski
- Stanisław Pięta
- Marian Piłka
- Jerzy Polaczek
- Marek Polak
- Paweł Poncyljusz
- Tomasz Poręba
- Andrzej Pruszkowski
- Bernard Ptak
- Krzysztof Putra
- Adam Puza
- Maciej Płażyński

== R ==
- Elżbieta Rafalska
- Józef Ramlau
- Zbigniew Religa
- Adam Rogacki
- Józef Rogacki
- Nelli Rokita
- Giovanni Roman
- Zbigniew Romaszewski
- Wojciech Roszkowski
- Andrzej Ruciński
- Jarosław Rusiecki
- Monika Ryniak
- Erwina Ryś-Ferens

== S ==
- Małgorzata Sadurska
- Jacek Sauk
- Grzegorz Schreiber
- Dariusz Seliga
- Jarosław Sellin
- Michał Seweryński
- Edward Siarka
- Radosław Sikorski
- Anna Sobecka
- Andrzej Sośnierz
- Jarosław Stawiarski
- Małgorzata Stryjska
- Marek Surmacz
- Marek Suski
- Wojciech Szarama
- Aleksander Szczygło
- Jolanta Szczypińska
- Andrzej Szlachta
- Bartłomiej Szrajber
- Stanisław Szwed
- Beata Szydło
- Konrad Szymański
- Jan Szyszko

== T ==
- Krzysztof Tchórzewski
- Ryszard Terlecki
- Grzegorz Tobiszowski

== U ==
- Kazimierz Michał Ujazdowski

== W ==
- Mieczysław Walkiewicz
- Andrzej Walkowiak
- Zbigniew Wassermann
- Ryszard Wawryniewicz
- Tadeusz Wita
- Elżbieta Witek
- Waldemar Wiązowski
- Elżbieta Więcławska-Sauk
- Jadwiga Wiśniewska
- Lucyna Wiśniewska
- Michał Wojtkiewicz
- Piotr Woźniak
- Marzena Wróbel
- Paweł Wypych

== Z ==
- Stanisław Zadora
- Stanisław Zając
- Paweł Zalewski
- Artur Zawisza
- Sławomir Zawiślak
- Łukasz Zbonikowski
- Jarosław Zieliński
- Zbigniew Ziobro
- Maria Zuba
- Jan Zubowski
- Kosma Złotowski

== Ć ==
- Andrzej Ćwierz

== Ł ==
- Marek Łatas

== Ż ==
- Jarosław Żaczek
- Zbigniew Ziobro
- Wojciech Żukowski
