= List of Solidarity Electoral Action politicians =

A list of notable Polish politicians of the former Solidarity Electoral Action party (Polish: Akcja Wyborcza Solidarność).

== A ==
- Paweł Abramski
- Franciszek Adamczyk
- Andrzej Adamowicz
- Paweł Adamowicz
- Elżbieta Adamska-Wedler
- Mariusz Ambroziak
- Andrzej Andrysiak
- Piotr Andrzejewski
- Andrzej Anusz
- Dorota Arciszewska-Mielewczyk
- Jan Krzysztof Ardanowski
- Wojciech Arkuszewski
- Paweł Arndt
- Marek Ast

== B ==
- Zbigniew Babalski
- Adam Bachleda-Curuś
- Franciszek Bachleda-Księdzularz
- Artur Balazs
- Zdzisław Banat
- Kazimierz Barczyk
- Waldemar Bartosz
- Elżbieta Barys
- Jerzy Barzowski
- Jarosław Bauc
- Teresa Bazała
- Zygmunt Berdychowski
- Józef Bergier
- Adam Biela
- Adam Bielan
- Czesław Bielecki
- Marek Biernacki
- Anna Bogucka-Skowrońska
- Jerzy Borcz
- Jerzy Borowczak
- Ryszard Brejza
- Tadeusz Brzozowski
- Jerzy Budnik
- Leszek Burakowski
- Ryszard Burski
- Józef Buszman
- Jerzy Buzek
- Wojciech Błasiak
- Józef Błaszczeć

== C ==
- Piotr Całbecki
- Franciszka Cegielska
- Michał Chałoński
- August Chełkowski
- Zbigniew Chlebowski
- Jan Chmielewski
- Jan Chodkowski
- Jan Chojnowski
- Zygmunt Cholewiński
- Stanisław Chrobak
- Andrzej Chronowski
- Paweł Chrupek
- Andrzej Chrzanowski
- Wiesław Chrzanowski
- Zbigniew Chrzanowski
- Stanisław Cieśla
- Grzegorz Cygonik
- Tadeusz Cymański
- Marek Czarnecki
- Ryszard Czarnecki
- Jerzy Czerwiński
- Ignacy Czeżyk
- Krystyna Czuba
- Dorota Czudowska

== D ==
- Władysław Dajczak
- Wojciech Daniel
- Edward Daszkiewicz
- Marian Dembiński
- Zdzisław Denysiuk
- Marian Dojka
- Ludwik Dorn
- Andrzej Drętkiewicz
- Jacek Duchnowski
- Waldemar Dudziak
- Henryk Dykty
- Lech Dymarski
- Jerzy Dyner
- Henryk Dyrda
- Józef Dąbrowski
- Jacek Dębski

== E ==
- Zbigniew Eysmont

== F ==
- Joanna Fabisiak
- Zbigniew Farmus
- Kazimierz Ferenc
- Lech Feszler
- Zbigniew Fijak
- Kazimierz Filipiak
- Zbigniew Filipkowski
- Wojciech Frank
- Barbara Frączek
- Józef Frączek

== G ==
- Andrzej Gabryszewski
- Andrzej Gargaś
- Waldemar Gasper
- Roman Giedrojć
- Mieczysław Gil
- Szymon Giżyński
- Adam Glapiński
- Marian Goliński
- Henryk Goryszewski
- Andrzej Maria Gołaś
- Mariusz Grabowski
- Aleksander Grad
- Andrzej Grajewski
- Wojciech Grochowski
- Jerzy Grohman
- Marek Grzelaczyk
- Grzegorz Grzelak
- Alicja Grześkowiak
- Ignacy Guenther
- Wojciech Gulin
- Andrzej Gut-Mostowy
- Jerzy Guła
- Jerzy Gwiżdż
- Józef Górny
- Stanisław Głowacki

== H ==
- Aleksander Hall
- Mirosław Handke
- Andrzej Hardy
- Wojciech Hausner
- Jolanta Hibner
- Przemysław Hniedziewicz
- Stanisław Hoffmann
- Jerzy Hrybacz

== I ==
- Witold Idczak
- Ryszard Iwan
- Stanisław Iwan
- Stanisław Iwanicki

== J ==
- Jan Maria Jackowski
- Jarosław Jagiełło
- Kazimierz Janiak
- Sławomir Janicki
- Jacek Janiszewski
- Michał Janiszewski
- Maciej Stanisław Jankowski
- Maciej Jankowski
- Gabriel Janowski
- Mieczysław Janowski
- Andrzej Jaroch
- Paweł Jaros
- Stanisław Jarosz
- Mirosław Jasiński
- Marian Jaszewski
- Andrzej Jaworski
- Lech Jaworski
- Stanisław Jałowiecki
- Stefan Jurczak
- Krzysztof Jurgiel

== K ==
- Grzegorz Kaczmarzyk
- Jarosław Kaczyński
- Marek Kaczyński
- Aldona Kamela-Sowińska
- Teresa Kamińska
- Krzysztof Kamiński
- Mariusz Kamiński
- Michał Kamiński
- Kazimierz Kapera
- Jacek Karnowski
- Karol Karski
- Tomasz Karwowski
- Michał Kasiński
- Tadeusz Kaszubski
- Elżbieta Kaufman-Suszko
- Leszek Kawski
- Andrzej Kaźmierczak
- Marek Kempski
- Andrzej Kern
- Władysław Kielian
- Tadeusz Kilian
- Wiesław Kilian
- Leszek Kisiel
- Feliks Klimczak
- Anna Knysok
- Zdzisława Kobylińska
- Witold Kochan
- Stanisław Kogut
- Marek Kolasiński
- Longin Komołowski
- Stefan Konarski
- Józef Korpak
- Tadeusz Kowalczyk
- Witold Kowalski
- Janusz Koza
- Andrzej Kozioł
- Jan Kozłowski
- Bartłomiej Kołodziej
- Robert Kościelny
- Mirosław Koźlakiewicz
- Norbert Krajczy
- Zofia Krasicka-Domka
- Ryszard Kraszewski
- Janina Kraus
- Witold Krochmal
- Jerzy Kropiwnicki
- Mirosław Kruszyński
- Piotr Krutul
- Sławomir Kryszkowski
- Andrzej Krzak
- Marian Krzaklewski
- Dariusz Kubiak
- Mirosław Kukliński
- Jan Kulas
- Jacek Kurski
- Krzysztof Kwiatkowski
- Ryszard Kędra
- Krzysztof Kłak
- Dariusz Kłeczek

== L ==
- Krzysztof Laga
- Grażyna Langowska
- Tomasz Latos
- Zbigniew Lech
- Tadeusz Bernard Lewandowski
- Tadeusz Stefan Lewandowski
- Ewa Lewicka-Banaszak
- Leszek Lewoc
- Marcin Libicki
- Edward Lipiec
- Krzysztof Lipiec
- Dariusz Lipiński
- Władysław Lisewski
- Teresa Liszcz
- Wojciech Lubawski
- Józef Lubieniecki

== M ==
- Jan Majchrowski
- Stanisław Majdański
- Krzysztof Majka
- Wojciech Maksymowicz
- Edward Maniura
- Bolesław Marciniszyn
- Kazimierz Marcinkiewicz
- Stanisław Marczuk
- Marek Markiewicz
- Zdzisław Maszkiewicz
- Jerzy Masłowski
- Ryszard Masłowski
- Piotr Mateja
- Ryszard Matusiak
- Marek Matuszewski
- Eugeniusz Matyjas
- Andrzej Tadeusz Mazurkiewicz
- Tadeusz Maćkała
- Ewa Mańkowska
- Cezary Mech
- Ireneusz Michalak
- Marek Michalik
- Krzysztof Michalski
- Tomasz Michałowski
- Konstanty Miodowicz
- Stanisław Misztal
- Marian Miłek
- Józef Mozolewski
- Eugeniusz Moś
- Zbigniew Mroziński
- Jan Musiał
- Maciej Musiał
- Piotr Mync

== N ==
- Jerzy Nalichowski
- Marek Nawara
- Witold Nieduszyński
- Szymon Niemiec
- Stefan Niesiołowski
- Ireneusz Niewiarowski
- Sławomir Nitras
- Czesław Nowak
- Maria Nowak
- Halina Nowina Konopka
- Paweł Nowok

== O ==
- Krzysztof Oksiuta
- Jan Olbrycht
- Jerzy Olejniczak
- Mariusz Olszewski
- Grzegorz Opala
- Władysław Ortyl
- Andrzej Osnowski
- Tomasz Osowski
- Andrzej Ostoja-Owsiany
- Jerzy Ostrouch

== P ==
- Sławomir Pajor
- Tadeusz Parchański
- Ignacy Pardyka
- Jan Parys
- Waldemar Pawłowski
- Janusz Pałubicki
- Cezary Piasecki
- Grzegorz Piechowiak
- Krzysztof Piesiewicz
- Antoni Pietkiewicz
- Leszek Piotrowski
- Maria Piór
- Jan Piątkowski
- Marian Piłka
- Paweł Podczaski
- Jerzy Polaczek
- Piotr Polmański
- Paweł Poncyljusz
- Marian Poślednik
- Andrzej Pruszkowski
- Zdzisław Pupa
- Zbigniew Pusz
- Adam Pęzioł
- Maciej Płażyński
- Elżbieta Płonka

== R ==
- Robert Raczyński
- Józef Ramlau
- Adam Rams
- Jan Rejczak
- Józef Rojek
- Jan Rokita
- Jadwiga Rudnicka
- Maciej Rudnicki
- Roman Rutkowski
- Jacek Rybicki
- Zbigniew Rynasiewicz
- Czesław Ryszka
- Edward Rzepka
- Bogdan Rzońca

== S ==
- Sławomir Sadowski
- Janina Sagatowska
- Franciszek Sak
- Henryk Sapalski
- Andrzej Sasuła
- Grzegorz Schreiber
- Mirosław Sekuła
- Jarosław Sellin
- Zbigniew Senkowski
- Zbigniew Sieczkoś
- Tadeusz Sierżant
- Andrzej Sikora
- Andrzej Sikora
- Waldemar Sikora
- Roman Skrzypczak
- Władysław Skrzypek
- Maria Smereczyńska
- Andrzej Smoliński
- Leszek Smykowski
- Andrzej Sobański
- Anna Sobecka
- Czesław Sobierajski
- Bogusław Sonik
- Tomasz Sowiński
- Grażyna Sołtyk
- Marian Sołtysiewicz
- Maciej Srebro
- Edmund Sroka
- Wiktor Stasiak
- Stanisław Stańdo
- Janusz Steinhoff
- Mirosław Styczeń
- Jerzy Stępień
- Włodzimierz Sumara
- Jacek Swakoń
- Mirosław Swoszowski
- Brunon Synak
- Wojciech Szarama
- Jacek Szczot
- Mieczysław Szczygieł
- Franciszek Szelwicki
- Romuald Szeremietiew
- Andrzej Szkaradek
- Jerzy Szmit
- Grzegorz Szpyrka
- Bartłomiej Szrajber
- Grażyna Sztark
- Stanisław Szwed
- Bernard Szweda
- Hans Szyc
- Antoni Szymański
- Konrad Szymański
- Zbigniew Szymański
- Jan Szyszko
- Tomasz Szyszko

== T ==
- Stanisław Tamm
- Krzysztof Tchórzewski
- Antoni Tokarczuk
- Bogdan Tomaszek
- Ewa Tomaszewska
- Janusz Tomaszewski
- Witold Tomczak
- Ryszard Tur
- Jacek Turczyński
- Bolesław Twaróg
- Jacek Tworkowski
- Antoni Tyczka
- Marcin Tyrna

== U ==
- Kazimierz Michał Ujazdowski
- Arkadiusz Urban
- Andrzej Urbański
- Ligia Urniaż-Grabowska
- Aleksander Usakiewicz
- Piotr Uszok

== W ==
- Urszula Wachowska
- Wiesław Walendziak
- Grzegorz Walendzik
- Piotr Walerych
- Mieczysław Walkiewicz
- Włodzimierz Wasiński
- Jan Waszkiewicz
- Marek Waszkowiak
- Zbigniew Wawak
- Ryszard Wawryniewicz
- Jerzy Widzyk
- Andrzej Wieczorek
- Roman Wierzbicki
- Kazimierz Wilk
- Sławomir Willenberg
- Wilibald Winkler
- Andrzej Wiszniewski
- Edmund Wittbrodt
- Waldemar Wiązowski
- Kazimierz Wlazło
- Teofil Wojciechowski
- Michał Wojtczak
- Andrzej Wojtyła
- Janusz Woźnica
- Andrzej Woźnicki
- Tadeusz Wrona
- Andrzej Wybrański
- Dariusz Wójcik
- Marek Jan Wójcik
- Piotr Wojciech Wójcik
- Tomasz Feliks Wójcik
- Stanisław Wądołowski
- Emil Wąsacz

== Z ==
- Stanisław Zając
- Jadwiga Zakrzewska
- Andrzej Zakrzewski
- Andrzej Zapałowski
- Ireneusz Zarzycki
- Jan Zarębski
- Zbigniew Zarębski
- Artur Zawisza
- Marek Zdrojewski
- Ryszard Zembaczyński
- Sławomir Zgrzywa
- Andrzej Zieliński
- Wojciech Ziemniak
- Zenon Złakowski
- Kosma Złotowski

== Ł ==
- Marek Łatas
- Jan Łopuszański
- Adam Łoziński
- Zygmunt Łupina
- Karol Łużniak
- Paweł Łączkowski

== Ś ==
- Krzysztof Śmieja
- Adam Śnieżek
- Maciej Świątkowski

== Ż ==
- Jarosław Żaczek
- Piotr Żak
- Jacek Żalek
- Czesław Żelichowski
- Jerzy Żurawiecki
- Bogdan Żurek
