= List of Centre Agreement politicians =

A list of notable Polish politicians and members of the defunct Centre Agreement party (Polish: Porozumienie Centrum).

== A ==
- Andrzej Adamczyk
- Waldemar Andzel

== B ==
- Bogusław Bosak
- Joachim Brudziński
- Mariusz Błaszczak

== C ==
- Tadeusz Cymański
- Krzysztof Czarnecki
- Witold Czarnecki

== D ==
- Andrzej Diakonow
- Ludwik Dorn

== G ==
- Szymon Giżyński
- Adam Glapiński
- Małgorzata Gosiewska
- Przemysław Gosiewski
- Andrzej Maria Gołaś

== H ==
- Zbigniew Hoffmann

== J ==
- Krzysztof Jurgiel

== K ==
- Jarosław Kaczyński
- Lech Kaczyński
- Karol Karski
- Leonard Krasulski
- Marek Kuchciński
- Jacek Kurski
- Krzysztof Kwiatkowski

== L ==
- Adam Lipiński
- Andrzej Liss

== M ==
- Ewa Malik
- Mirosława Masłowska
- Jerzy Materna

== N ==
- Aleksandra Natalli-Świat
- Ryszard Nowak

== O ==
- Jan Olszewski

== P ==
- Jan Parys
- Krzysztof Piesiewicz
- Julia Pitera
- Marcin Przybyłowicz
- Krzysztof Putra

== S ==
- Andrzej Smirnow
- Marek Suski
- Jolanta Szczypińska
- Bartłomiej Szrajber
- Jan Szyszko

== T ==
- Krzysztof Tchórzewski

== W ==
- Waldemar Wiązowski
- Wojciech Włodarczyk

== Z ==
- Jarosław Zieliński
- Kosma Złotowski
