= Members of Polish Sejm elected from Kraków constituency =

Members of Polish national Parliament (Sejm) elected from Kraków constituency (2005 election) include:

- Andrzej Adamczyk, (Law and Justice)
- Bogusław Bosak, (Law and Justice)
- Barbara Bubula, (Law and Justice)
- Kazimierz Chrzanowski, (Democratic Left Alliance)
- Jerzy Feliks Fedorowicz, (Civic Platform)
- Marek Bolesław Kotlinowski, (League of Polish Families)
- Jacek Krupa, (Civic Platform)
- Ireneusz Raś, (Civic Platform)
- Jan Maria Rokita, (Civic Platform)
- Monika Ryniak, (Law and Justice)
- Tomasz Szczypiński, (Civic Platform)
- Zbigniew Wassermann, (Law and Justice)
- Zbigniew Ziobro, (Law and Justice).
