= Marzena Machałek =

Polish politician (born 1960)

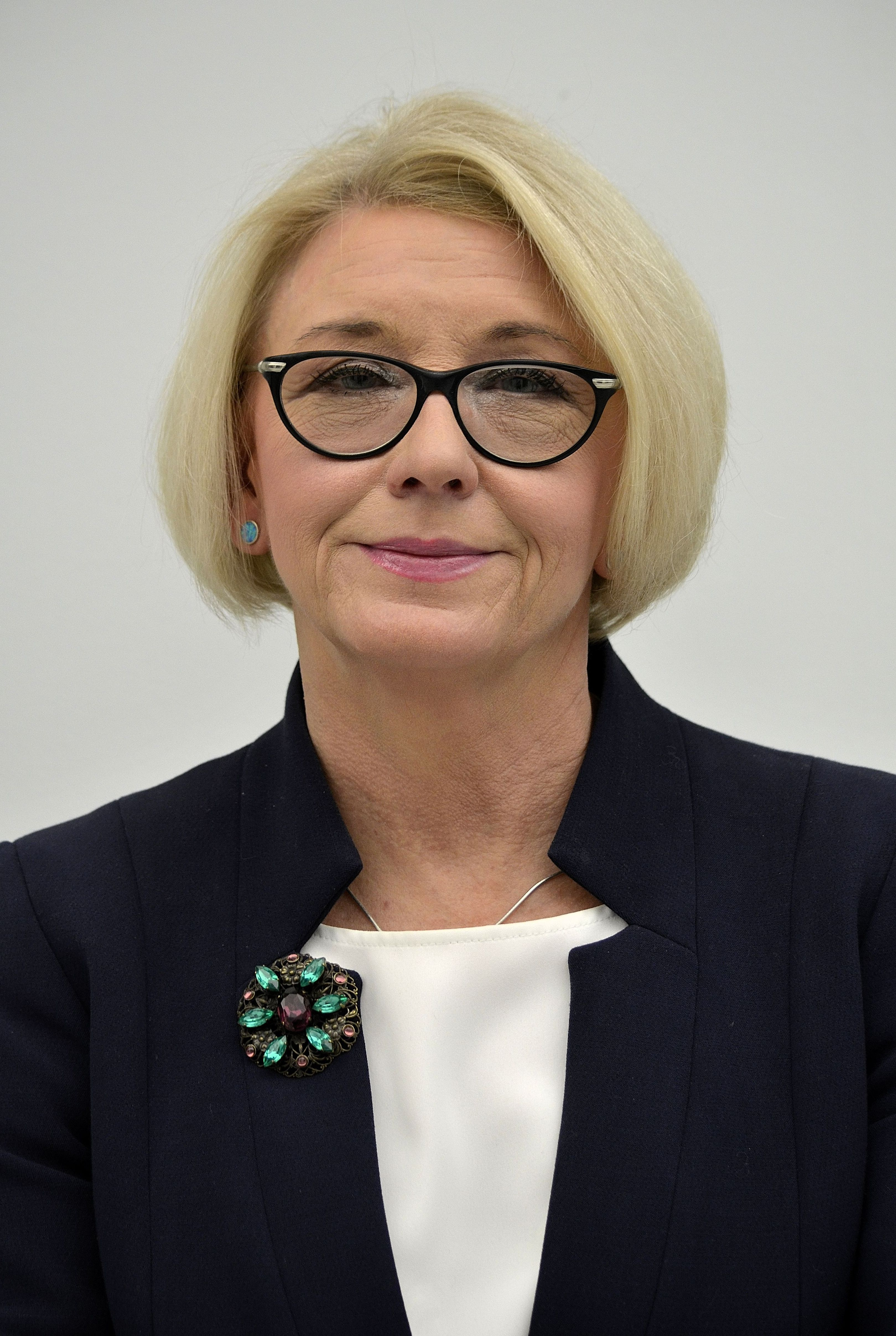

Member of Sejm
- Incumbent
- Assumed office 5 December 2006

Personal details
- Born: 29 August 1960 (age 65) Wrocław
- Party: Law and Justice
- Website: http://www.marzenamachalek.pl/

Marzena Anna Machałek (born 29 August 1960) is a Polish politician who has served in the Sejm since 5 December 2006 as a member of the Law and Justice party. Born in Wrocław, she graduated from the University of Wrocław in 1992 with a degree in Polish philology. She spent the 1980s and 1990s working as a teacher, and was also part of the Solidarity movement. In 1998 she was elected to Kamienna Góra County's council, and served as the deputy mayor as well. In 2006, she was nominated to the Sejm to finish out Jan Zubowski's term, who was elected mayor of Głogów.

After finishing up the term, Machałek has since been re-elected to three more terms in the Legnica district. She received 11,109 votes in 2007, 11,812 votes in 2011, and 14,608 votes in 2015. In 2014, she ran in the European Parliament election, and finished fifth behind out of ten candidates, losing to Kazimierz Michał Ujazdowski. In her most recent term on the Sejm, she has primarily served on the Committee on Education, Science and Youth. In previous terms she had served on the Local Government and Regional Policy Committee.

In 2016, Machałek began to push for educational reform and consolidation, which included moving from three levels of school to two, primary school and high school. In early 2017 the reforms, which were passed, led to some members of the Polish Teachers’ Union going on strike in protest of the potential job cuts. In the same month as the strikes, Machałek was named the Deputy Minister of National Education.
