= Wita =

WITA is a Christian radio station in Knoxville, Tennessee, United States.

Wita or WITA may also refer to:

- Waktu Indonesia Tengah (WITA), an Indonesian time zone that is eight hours ahead of UTC
- Washington International Trade Association (WITA), a trade association
- Wita Lake, a lake in Blue Earth County, Minnesota, United States
- Tadeusz Wita (born 1958), a Polish politician
