= Andrzej Kosztowniak =

Polish politician (born 1976)

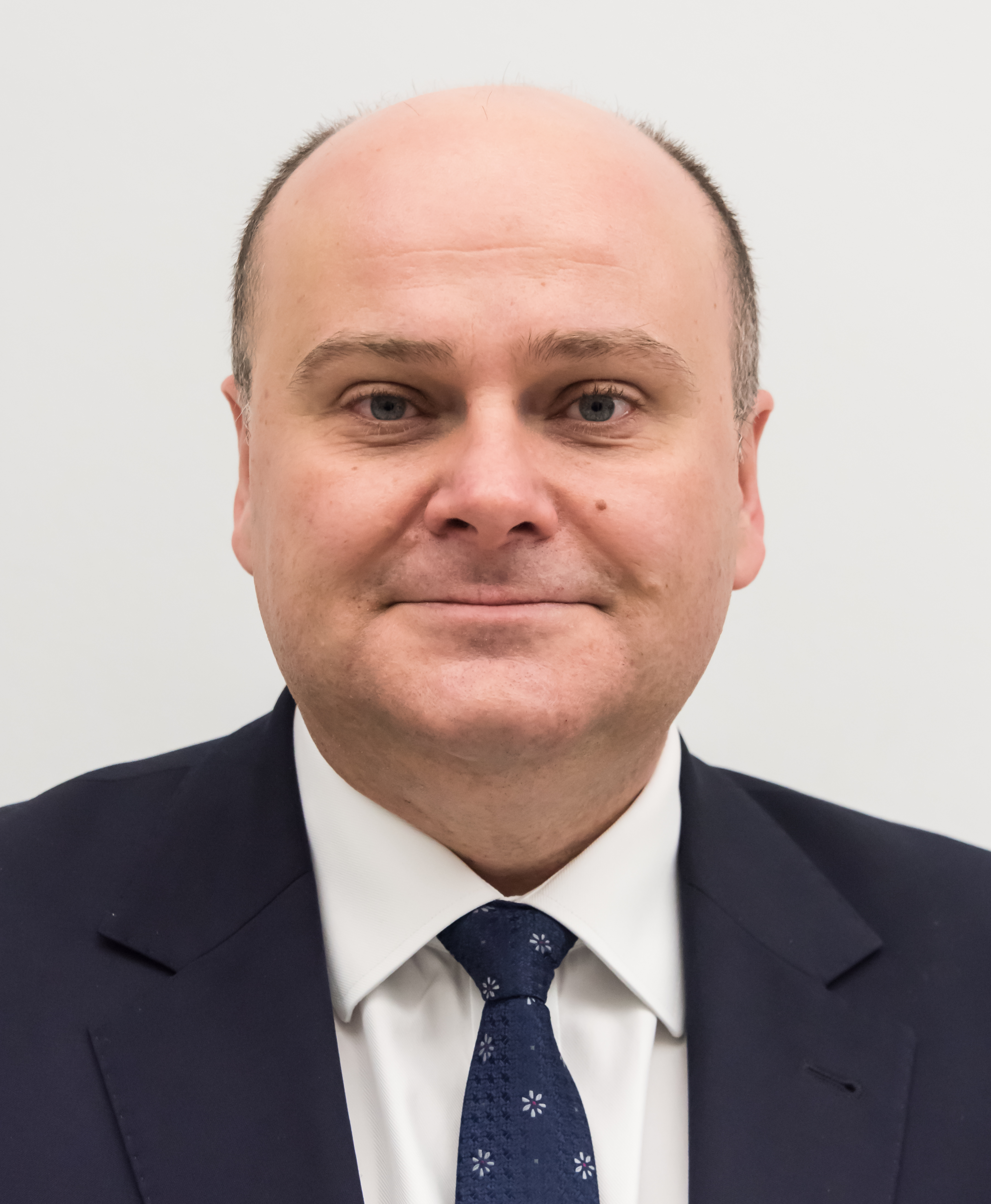

Minister of Finance
- In office 27 November 2023 – 13 December 2023
- Prime Minister: Mateusz Morawiecki
- Preceded by: Magdalena Rzeczkowska
- Succeeded by: Andrzej Domański

Mayor of Radom
- In office 30 November 2006 – 30 November 2014
- Preceded by: Zdzisław Marcinkowski
- Succeeded by: Radosław Witkowski

Personal details
- Born: 31 March 1976 (age 50) Radom, Poland
- Party: Law and Justice
- Spouse: Małgorzata Kosztowniak
- Children: Piotr and Aleksandra Kosztowniak
- Education: Maria Curie-Skłodowska University
- Occupation: Politician
- Website: www.kosztowniak.radom.pl/

Andrzej Tomasz Kosztowniak (born 31 March 1976) is a Polish politician. He is a member of the Law and Justice party and was the mayor of Radom from November 2006 to November 2014, when he was succeeded by Radosław Witkowski.

== Biography ==
Kosztowniak was born on 31 March 1976 in Radom, Poland and attended the Maria Curie-Skłodowska University.

On 27 November 2023, he was appointed minister of finance in Mateusz Morawiecki's third government.

== See also ==
- List of Law and Justice politicians

| Preceded by Zdzisław Marcinkowski | Mayor of Radom; 2006-2014 | Succeeded by Radosław Witkowski |
