= Marcin Gugulski =

Government Press Secretary
- In office 27 December 1991 – 31 May 1992
- President: Lech Wałęsa
- Prime Minister: Jan Olszewski
- Preceded by: Andrzej Zarębski
- Succeeded by: Jan Polkowski

Personal details
- Born: 25 August 1958 (age 68) Warsaw, Poland
- Party: Law and Justice
- Education: University of Warsaw
- Profession: Politician; Journalist; Intelligence analyst

Marcin Norbert Gugulski (born 25 August 1958) is a Polish politician, journalist, and intelligence analyst who served as Government Press Secretary for Prime Minister Jan Olszewski.

In his youth he was associated with the Polish anti-communist opposition and organizations like the Workers' Defence Committee.
