= Henryk Młynarczyk =

Polish politician

member of Sejm 2005-2007
- In office 25 September 2005 – ?

Personal details
- Born: 25 November 1955 (age 70) Krasnystaw, Poland
- Party: Samoobrona

Henryk Młynarczyk (born 25 November 1955 in Krasnystaw) is a Polish politician. He was elected to the Sejm on 25 September 2005, getting 13,633 votes in 7 Chełm district as a candidate from Samoobrona Rzeczpospolitej Polskiej list.

== See also ==
- Members of Polish Sejm 2005-2007
