= Krzysztof Mikuła =

Polish politician (born 1974)

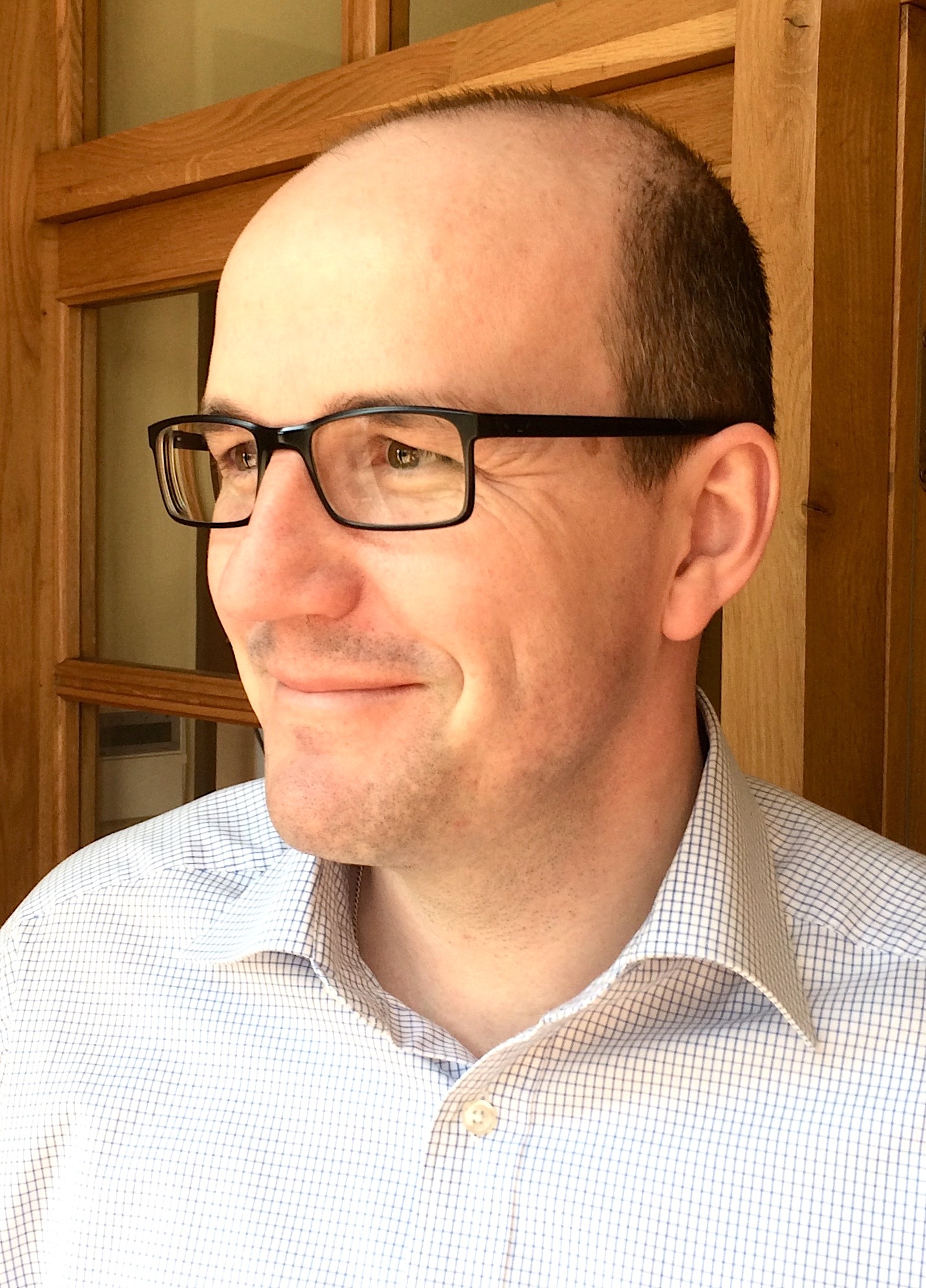

member of Sejm 2005-2007
- In office 25 September 2005 – 2007

Personal details
- Born: 3 July 1974 (age 51) Katowice
- Party: Law and Justice

Krzysztof Józef Mikuła (born 3 July 1974 in Katowice) is a Polish politician. He was elected to the Sejm on 25 September 2005, getting 10,208 votes in 31 Katowice district as a candidate from the Law and Justice list.

== See also ==
- Members of Polish Sejm 2005-2007
