= Andrzej Smirnow =

Polish politician

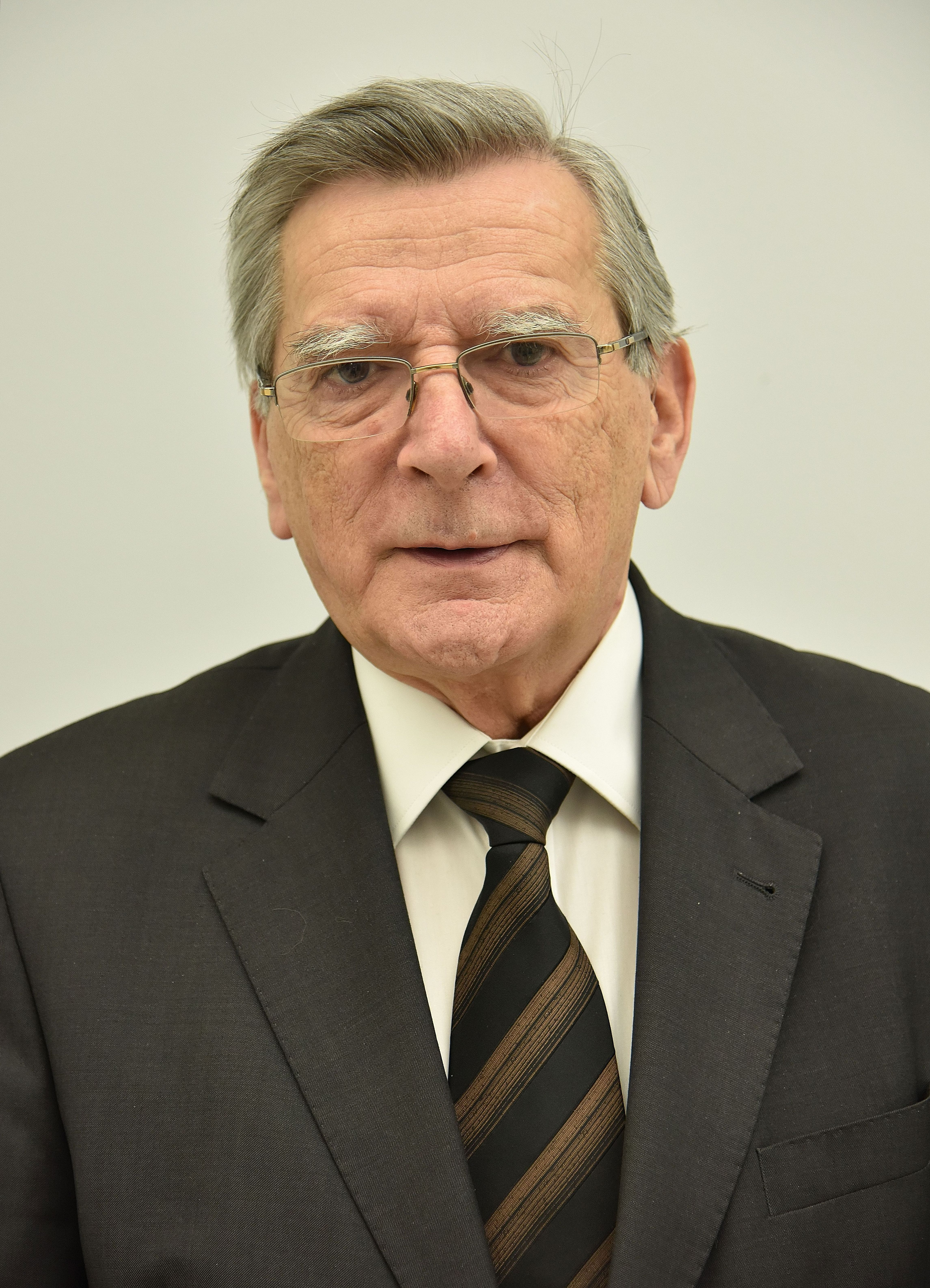

Member of the Sejm
- Incumbent
- Assumed office 25 September 2005
- Constituency: 20 – Warsaw II

Personal details
- Born: 1938 (age 87–88) Warsaw
- Party: Civic Platform

Andrzej Smirnow (born 9 September 1938) is a Polish politician. He was elected to the Sejm on 25 September 2005, getting 10,263 votes in 20 Warsaw district as a candidate from the Civic Platform list.

He was also a member of Sejm 1991-1993 and Sejm 1997-2001.

== See also ==
- Members of Polish Sejm 2005-2007
