= Marek Muszyński =

Polish politician (born 1947)

Deputy of the Sejm
- In office 2001 – 2005
- Constituency: 3 Wrocław
- In office 1991 – 1993
- Constituency: 11 Wrocław

Personal details
- Born: Marek Paweł Muszyński; 23 January 1947 (age 79) Lublin, Poland
- Party: Law and Justice (2001–2005)
- Other political affiliations: Solidarity (1991–1993)

Marek Paweł Muszyński (born 23 January 1947 in Lublin) is a Polish politician, a member of Law and Justice party. He was first elected to Sejm in 1991, and again in 2001.
