= Tomasz Markowski (politician) =

Polish politician (born 1968)

member of Sejm 2005-2007
- In office 25 September 2005 – 2007

Personal details
- Born: 30 May 1968 (age 57)
- Party: Law and Justice

Tomasz Maciej Markowski (born 30 May 1968 in Warsaw) is a Polish politician. He was elected to the Sejm on 25 September 2005, getting 17,097 votes in 4 Bydgoszcz district as a candidate from the Law and Justice list.

He was also a member of Sejm 2001-2005.

He is accused of embezzlement of 138,000 PLN from the parliament office.

== See also ==
- Members of Polish Sejm 2005-2007
