= Marek Surmacz =

Polish politician

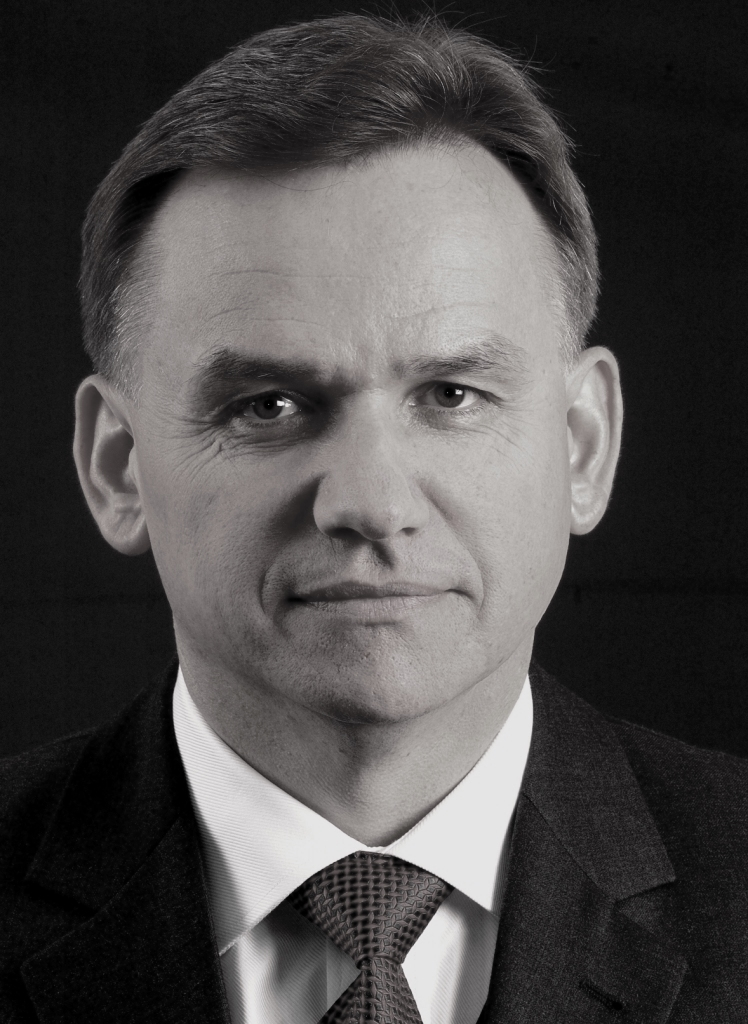

member of Sejm 2005-2007
- In office 25 September 2005 – 2007

Personal details
- Born: 31 January 1955 (age 71)
- Party: Law and Justice

Marek Tomasz Surmacz (born 31 January 1955 in Gorzów Wielkopolski) is a Polish politician. He was elected to the Sejm on 25 September 2005, getting 8386 votes in 8 Zielona Góra district as a candidatefrom the Law and Justice list.

== See also ==
- Members of Polish Sejm 2005-2007
