= Elżbieta Więcławska-Sauk =

Polish politician

Member of the Sejm
- Incumbent
- Assumed office 25 September 2005

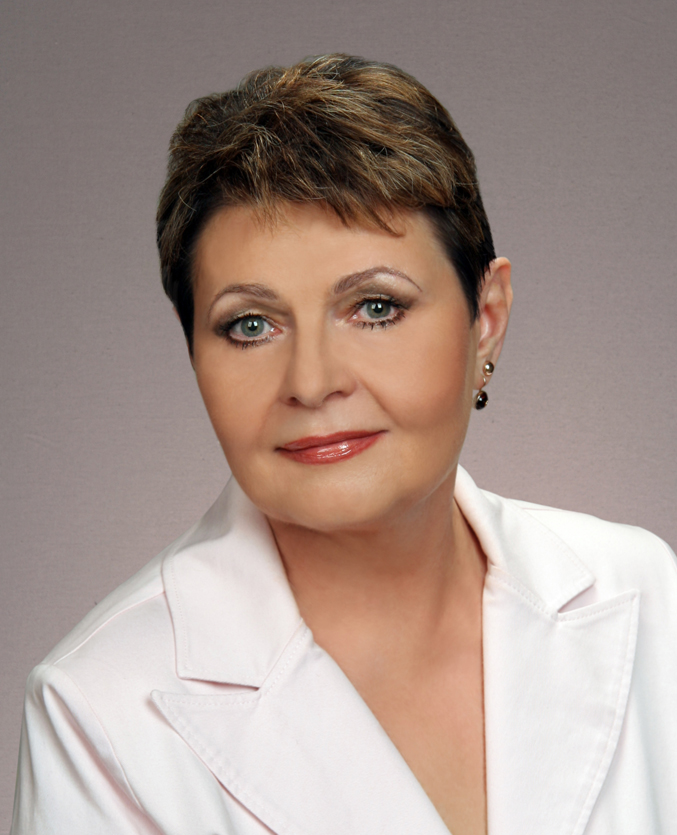
Elżbieta Więcławska-Sauk in 2005

Elżbieta Więcławska-Sauk (born 14 November 1947 in Łódź) is a Polish politician, member of Law and Justice party. She was elected to Sejm on 25 September 2005.
