= Paweł Nowok =

Polish politician and deputy (born 1942)

Paweł Nowok (January 2, 1942) is a Polish politician.

Nowok was born in Ruda Śląska. In 1965 he graduated from the Mechanical and Metallurgical Technical School for Working People in Katowice. In 1980 he joined the dissident "Solidarity" trade union. During 1997-2001 he was a member of the parliament nominated by the Solidarity Electoral Action.

== Awards ==
- 2017: Cross of Freedom and Solidarity
- 2017: Knight's Cross of the Order of Polonia Restituta
