= Michał Wojtkiewicz =

Polish politician (born 1946)

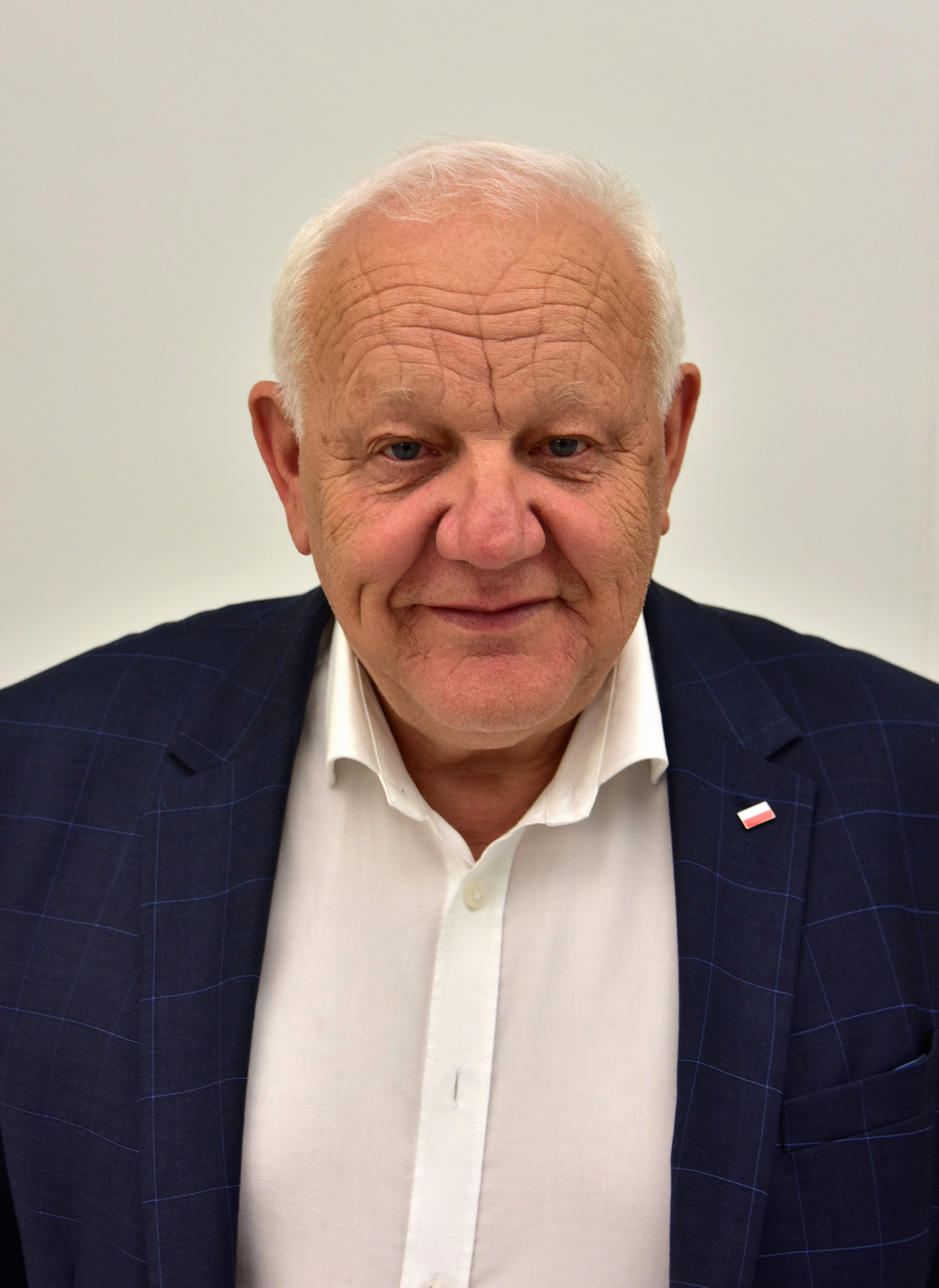

member of Sejm 2005-2007
- In office 25 September 2005 – ?

Personal details
- Born: 1946 (age 79–80)
- Party: Law and Justice

Michał Jan Wojtkiewicz (born 24 June 1946) is a Polish politician. He was elected to the Sejm on 25 September 2005, getting 8846 votes in 15 Tarnów district as a candidate from the Law and Justice list.

== See also ==
- Members of Polish Sejm 2005-2007
