= Anna Pakuła-Sacharczuk =

Polish politician (born 1956)

member of Sejm 2005-2007
- In office 25 September 2005 – 2007

Personal details
- Born: 10 August 1956 (age 69) Płońsk, Poland
- Party: Law and Justice

Anna Zofia Pakuła-Sacharczuk (born 10 August 1956) is a Polish politician. She was elected to the Sejm on 25 September 2005, getting 8,675 votes in 23 Rzeszów district as a candidate from the Law and Justice list.

== See also ==
- Members of Polish Sejm 2005-2007
