= Małgorzata Stryjska =

Polish politician (born 1953)

member of Sejm 2005-2007
- In office 25 September 2005 – 2007

Personal details
- Born: 3 August 1953 (age 72)
- Party: Law and Justice

Małgorzata Stryjska (born 3 August 1953 in Poznań) is a Polish politician. She was elected to the Sejm on 25 September 2005, getting 12 791 votes in 39 Poznań district, running as a candidate on the Law and Justice list.

She was also a member of Sejm 2001-2005.

== See also ==
- Members of Polish Sejm 2005-2007
