= Tadeusz Madziarczyk =

Polish politician (born 1961)

member of Sejm 2005-2007
- In office 25 September 2005 – 2007

Personal details
- Born: 1961 (age 64–65) Prudnik
- Party: Law and Justice

Tadeusz Józef Madziarczyk (born 21 February 1961) is a Polish politician. He was elected to the Sejm on 25 September 2005, getting 8,068 votes in 1 Legnica district as a candidate from the Law and Justice list.

== See also ==
- Members of Polish Sejm 2005-2007
