= Maria Zuba =

Polish politician (born 1951)

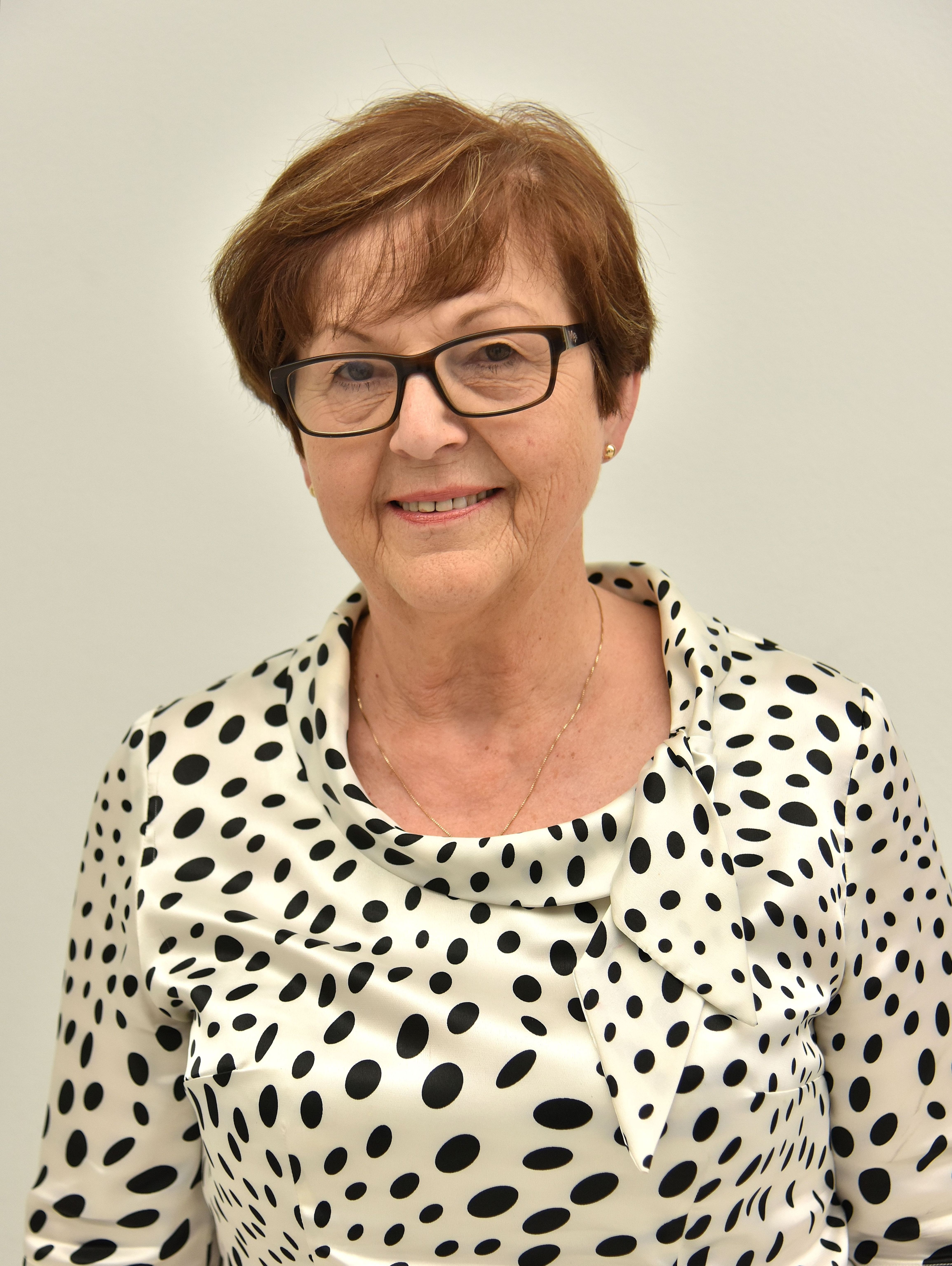

Member of the Sejm
- In office 25 September 2005 – 2019
- Constituency: 33 – Kielce

Personal details
- Born: 6 April 1951 (age 75) Suchedniów
- Party: Law and Justice

Maria Zuba (born 6 April 1951 in Suchedniów) is a Polish politician. She was elected to Sejm on 25 September 2005, getting 3397 votes in 33 Kielce district as a candidate from the Law and Justice list.

== See also ==
- Members of Polish Sejm 2005-2007
