= Maks Kraczkowski =

Polish politician and businessman

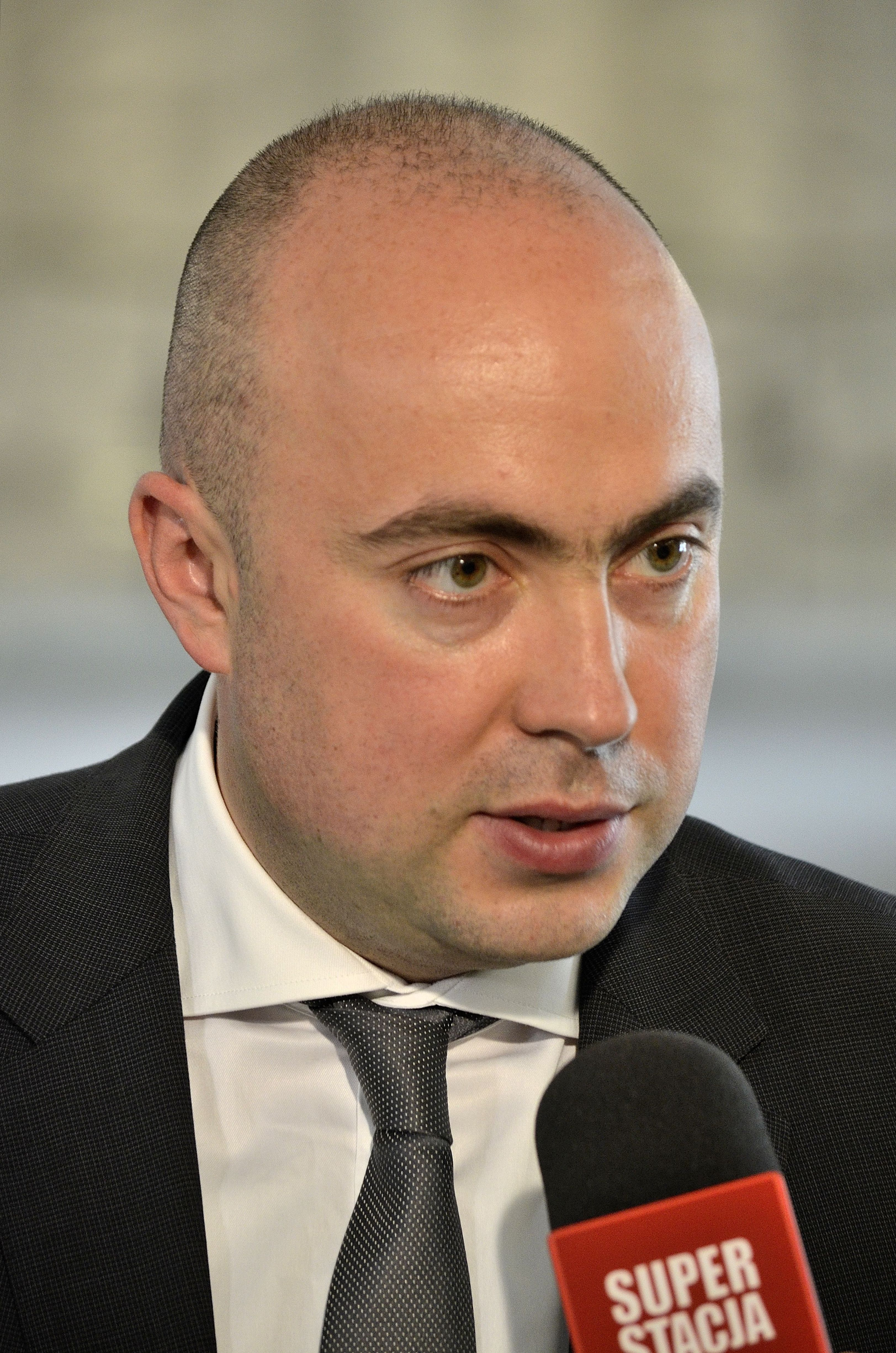

Personal details
- Born: 9 March 1979 (age 47) Warsaw, Poland

Maks Kraczkowski (born 9 March 1979) is a Polish politician and businessman.

== Education ==
He is a graduate of the Faculty of Law and Administration at the University of Warsaw. He also earned an executive MBA diploma and attended a six-week advanced management program at Harvard Business School.

== Professional career ==
Maks Kraczkowski is the founder and the president (until 2005) of the Law and Justice Youth Forum.

In 2005 he became the law and justice plenipotentiary for electoral district No. 38 in Wielkopolska, subsequently he became its president.

In 2006-2010 Kraczkowski served as secretary of the Law and Justice Political Council, earlier as secretary of the board of the Central Party and a member of the ethics committee of the party.

In 2002–2005, he served as councilor of the Capital City of Warsaw, and as chairperson of the audit committee of the city council. Moreover, he was a member of the committee of culture.

In 2005, he was democratically elected deputy in the fifth term in Pila electoral district. From June 2006 to the end of the fifth term of office of the Sejm, regardless of the turbulent changes in the coalition, he served as chairperson of the parliamentary committee of economy, also as a member of the legislation committee, and the chairperson of the standing subcommittee of the constitutional tribunal.

In the parliamentary elections in 2007, Maks Kraczkowski held a seat. Then he served as vice-chairperson of the economic committee. He was also a member of the legislation committee.

In the parliamentary elections on 9 October 2011, he held a parliamentary seat for a third time. During the seventh term he was re-appointed vice-chairperson of the economic committee.

He was elected to the Sejm on 25 September 2005, getting 10 458 votes in 38 Piła district. He was a candidate from the Law and Justice list.

Kraczkowski worked in the rules and deputies' affairs committee and the deregulation committee. Furthermore, he is a member of the programme Council of the magazine European Local Government Advisor (pol. Europejski Doradca Samorządowy) covering practical information in field of raising EU funds for local governments and a member of the research council of the quarterly magazine Legal and economic overview (pol. Przegląd prawno-ekonomiczny).

On 30 June 2016 he was appointed vice-president of the management board of PKO BP (from 4 July 2016), which resulted in the necessity to resign from parliamentary mandate. He also became the chairman of the supervisory board of Kredobank. In 2021, he was appointed chairman of the supervisory board of PKO Leasing

== See also ==
- Members of Polish Sejm 2005-2007
