= Andrzej Mańka =

Polish politician

member of Sejm 2005-2007
- In office 25 September 2005 – 2007

Personal details
- Born: 18 April 1967 (age 58) Lublin
- Party: League of Polish Families

Andrzej Mańka (Polish pronunciation: [ˈand.ʐɛj ˈmaɲka]; born 18 April 1967) is a Polish politician. He was elected to the Sejm on 25 September 2005, getting 10,646 votes in 6 Lublin district as a candidate from the League of Polish Families list.

He was also a member of Sejm 2001-2005. Recently he has joined the political party Right of the Republic.

== See also ==
- Members of Polish Sejm 2005-2007
