= Kazimierz Gołojuch =

Polish politician (born 1964)

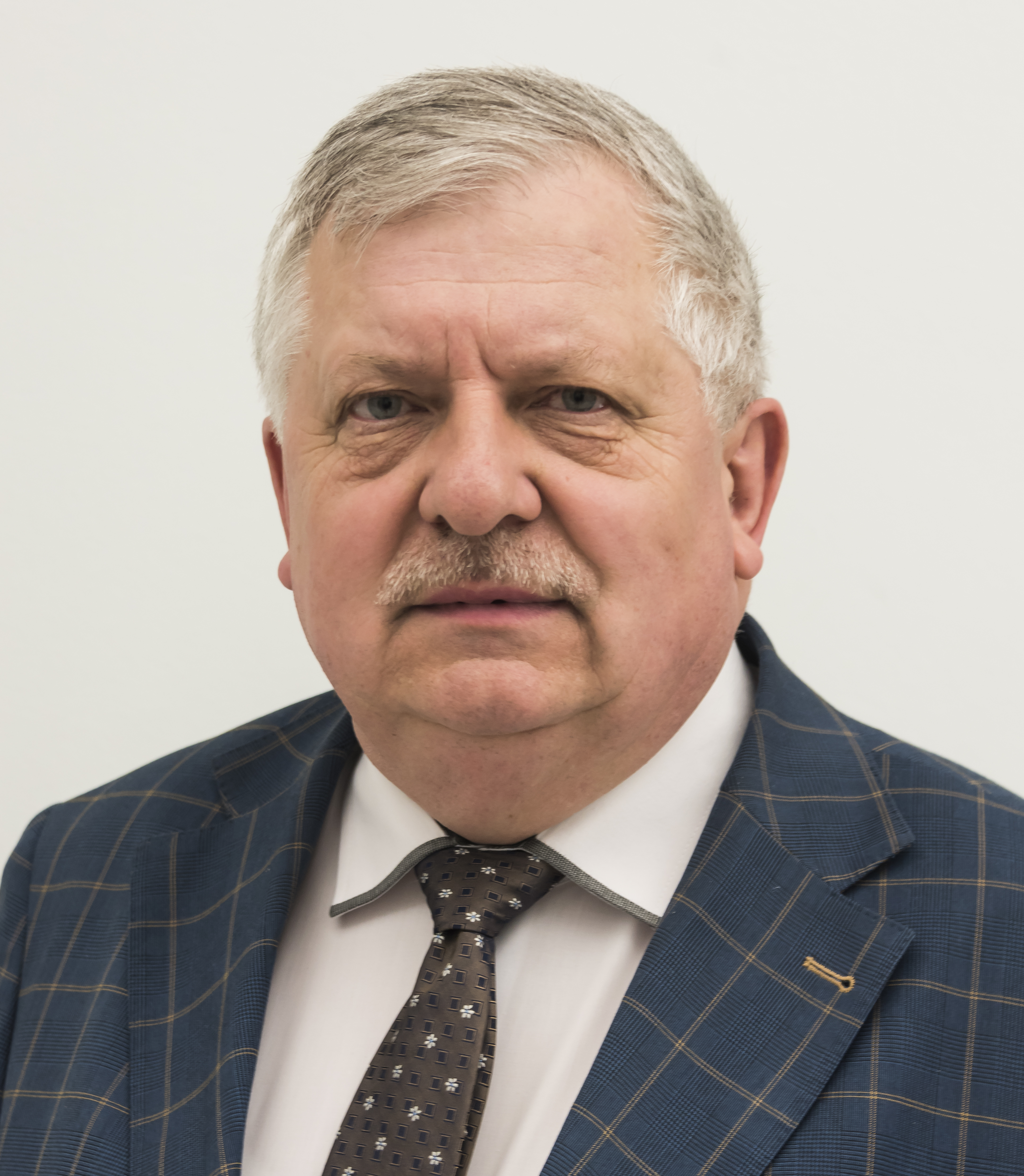

member of Sejm 2005-2007
- In office 25 September 2005 – ?

Personal details
- Born: 5 February 1964 (age 62)
- Party: Law and Justice

Kazimierz Edward Gołojuch (born 5 February 1964 in Łańcut) is a Polish politician. He was elected to the Sejm on 25 September 2005, getting 8245 votes in 23 Rzeszów district as a candidate from the Law and Justice list.

== See also ==
- Members of Polish Sejm 2005-2007
