= Marzena Wróbel =

Polish politician (born 1963)

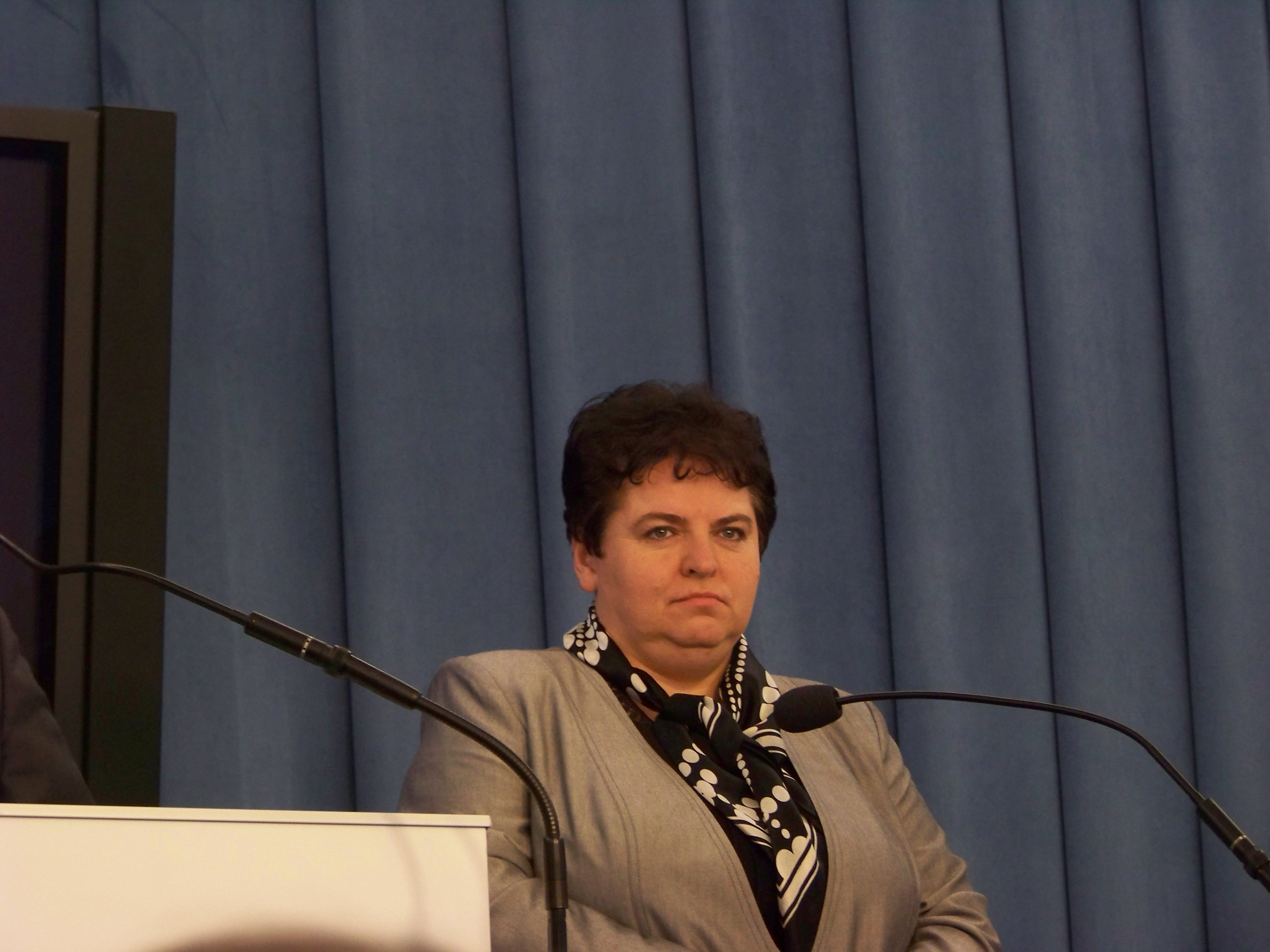
- Marzena Dorota Wróbel

member of Sejm 2005-2007
- In office 25 September 2005 – ?

Personal details
- Born: 1963 (age 62–63)
- Party: Law and Justice

Marzena Dorota Wróbel (born 15 October 1963, in Radom) is a Polish politician. She was elected to the Sejm on 25 September 2005, getting 7,524 votes in 17 Radom district as a candidate from the Law and Justice list.

== See also ==
- Members of Polish Sejm 2005-2007
