= Adam Rogacki =

Polish politician

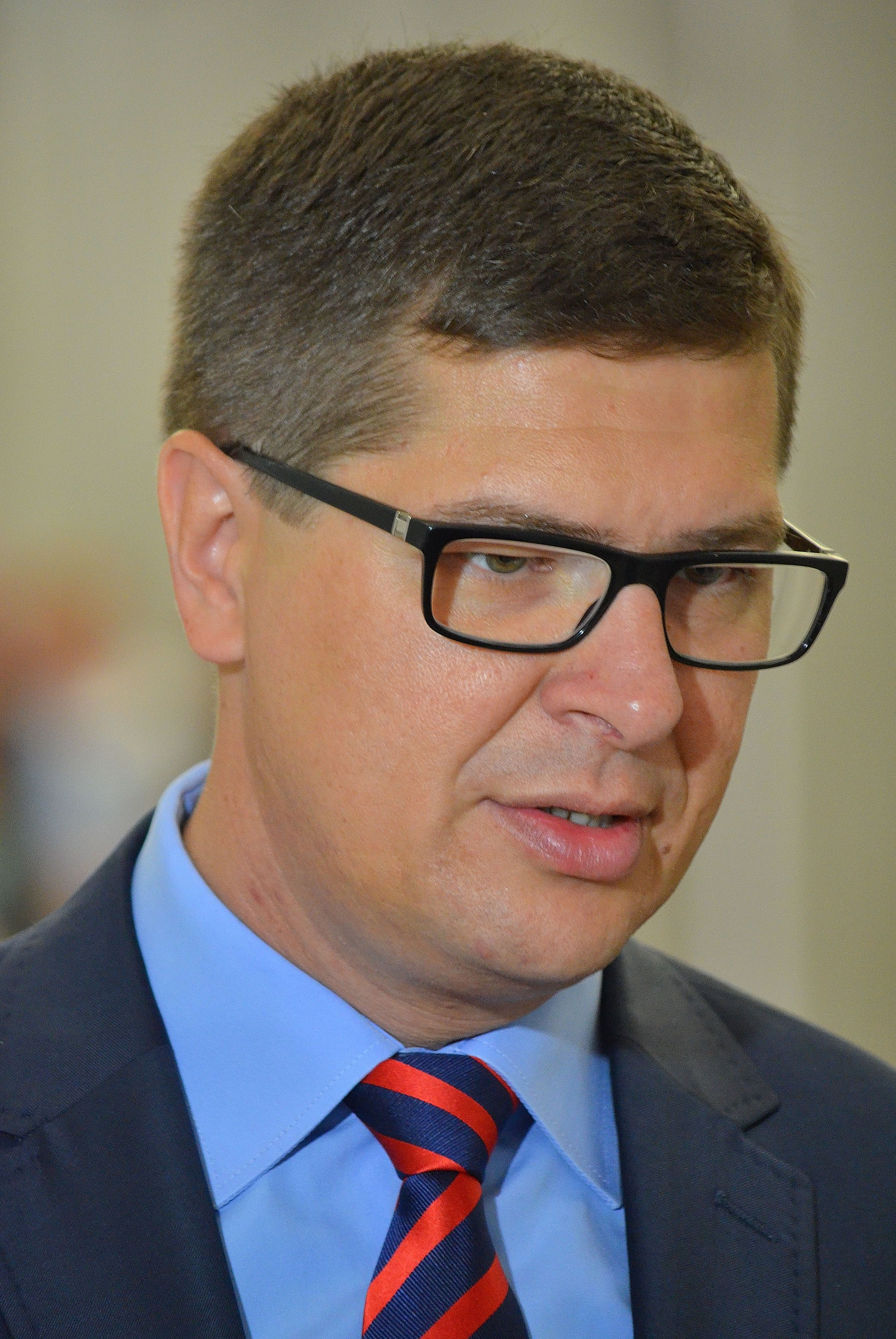

member of Sejm 2005-2007
- Incumbent
- Assumed office 25 September 2005

Personal details
- Born: 20 February 1976 (age 50)
- Party: Law and Justice

Adam Maksym Rogacki (born 20 February 1976) is a Polish politician. He was elected to the Sejm on 25 September 2005, getting 6905 votes in 36 Kalisz district as a candidate from the Law and Justice list.

== See also ==
- Members of Polish Sejm 2005-2007
