= Zbigniew Wassermann =

Polish politician

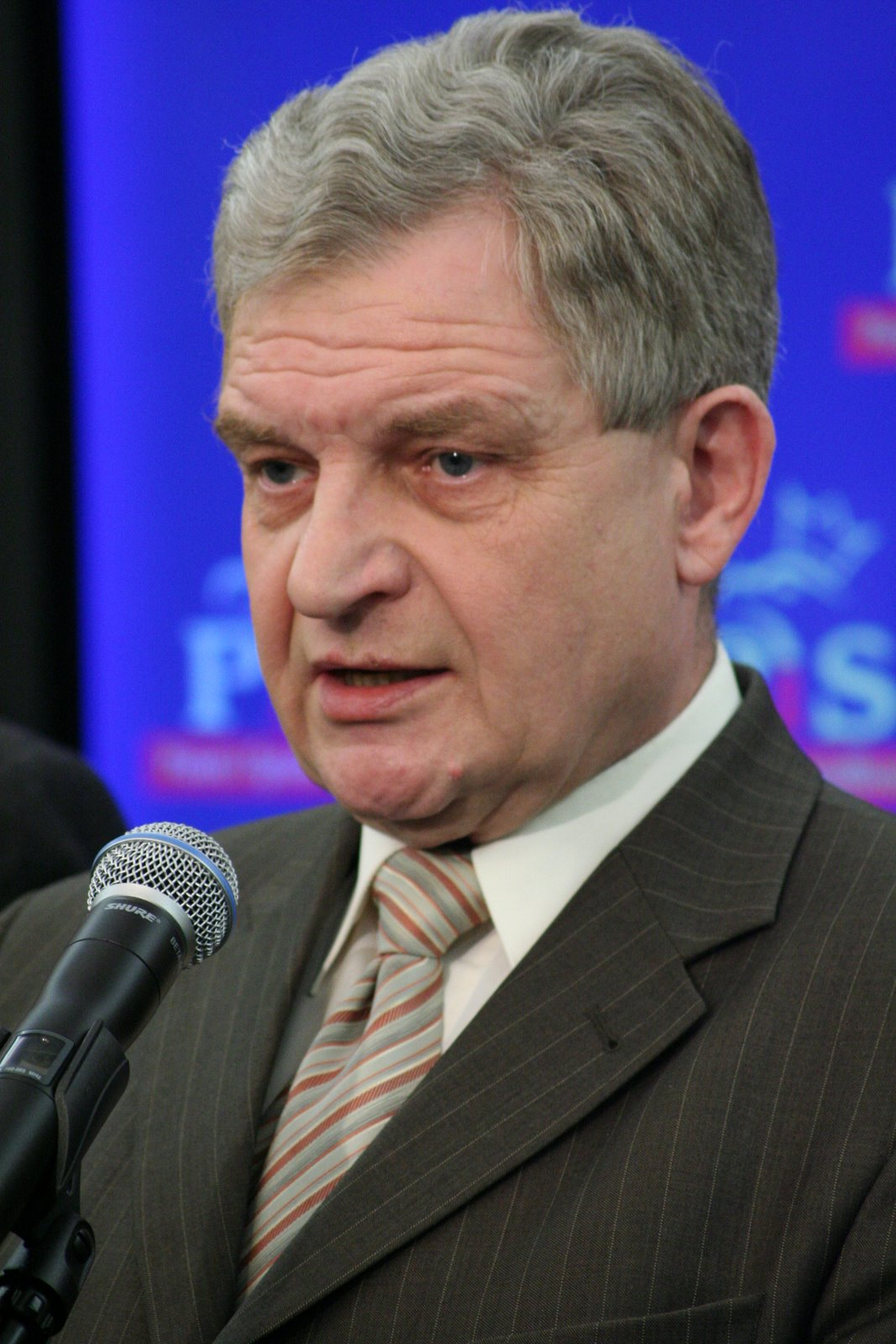
- Wassermann in 2008

Deputy of the Sejm
- In office 2001 – 2010
- Succeeded by: Monika Ryniak
- Constituency: 13 Kraków

Personal details
- Born: Zbigniew Franciszek Wassermann; 17 September 1949 Kraków, Poland
- Died: 10 April 2010 (aged 60) near Smolensk, Russia
- Party: Law and Justice

Zbigniew Franciszek Wassermann (IPA: [ˈzbʲiɡɲɛv ˈvasɛrman]; 17 September 1949 – 10 April 2010) was a Polish politician. He was an MP representing Law and Justice (Prawo i Sprawiedliwość).

Wassermann was born in Kraków. He was a graduate in law from Jagiellonian University (Uniwersytet Jagielloński, Wydział Prawa) and member of Sejm, lower house of Polish parliament, elected in Krakow constituency.

From July 2004, he was a member and the vice-chairman of PKN Orlen investigation commission. From November 2005 to November 2007 he was Minister of Special Forces in the Governments of Kazimierz Marcinkiewicz and Jarosław Kaczyński.

He was listed on the flight manifest of the Tupolev Tu-154 of the 36th Special Aviation Regiment carrying the President of Poland Lech Kaczyński which crashed near Smolensk-North airport near Pechersk near Smolensk, Russia, on 10 April 2010, killing all aboard.

On 16 April 2010 Wassermann was decorated posthumously with the Commander's Cross of the Order of Polonia Restituta and on 20 April 2010 he was buried in a cemetery in Krakow Bielany.
