= Andrzej Diakonow =

Polish politician (born 1950)

Deputy of the IV Sejm
- In office 2001 – 2005
- Constituency: 21 Opole

Personal details
- Born: Andrzej Mieczysław Diakonow; 14 January 1950 (age 75); Klembów, Poland
- Political party: Law and Justice

Andrzej Mieczysław Diakonow (born 14 January 1950 in Klembów) is a Polish politician, member of the Law and Justice party. He was elected to the Sejm in 2001.
