= Jarosław Jagiełło =

Polish politician (born 1971)

Member of the Sejm
- Incumbent
- Assumed office 25 September 2005
- Constituency: 9 – Łódź

Personal details
- Born: 1971 (age 54–55)
- Party: Congress of the New Right

Jarosław Tomasz Jagiełło (born 15 May 1971 in Łódź) is a Polish politician. He was elected to the Sejm on 25 September 2005, getting 13727 votes in 9 Łódź district as a candidate from the Law and Justice list. On 28 July 2014 he became a member of Congress of the New Right.

== See also ==
- Members of Polish Sejm 2005-2007
