= Andrzej Pruszkowski =

Polish politician (born 1960)

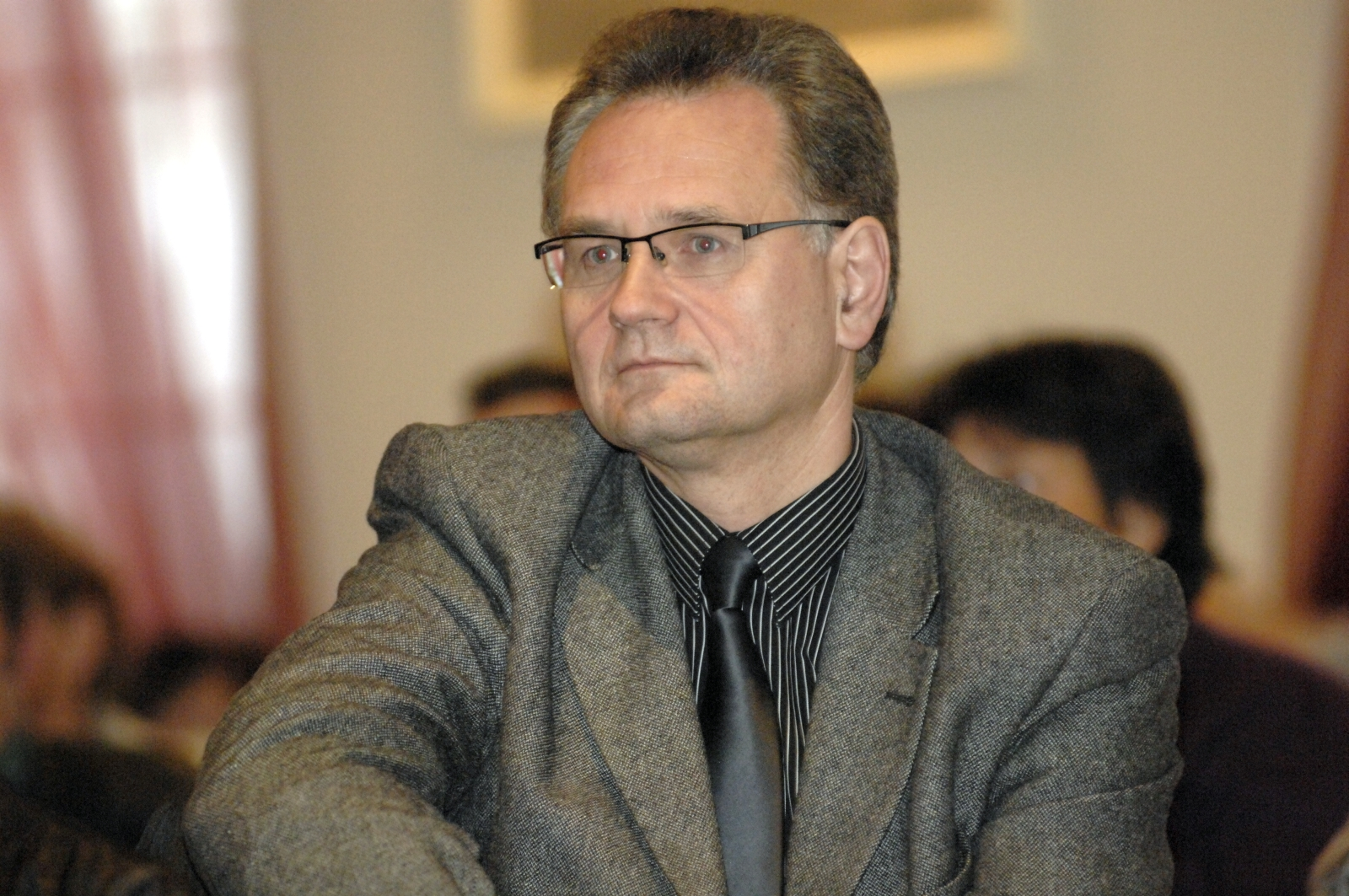
- Andrzej Pruszkowski in 2010

President (mayor) of Lublin
- In office 1998–2006

Andrzej Marek Pruszkowski (born 23 March 1960 in Michów, Lublin Voivodeship) is a Polish Politician who formerly served as the president (mayor) of Lublin from 1998 to 2006. Member of Law and Justice.
