= Jolanta Szczypińska =

Polish politician (1957–2018)

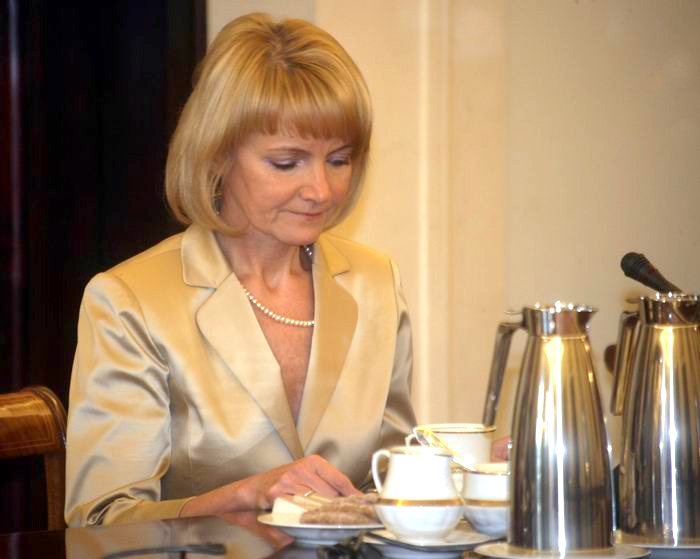
- Szczypińska in 2008

Member of the Sejm
- In office 25 September 2005 – 8 December 2018

Personal details
- Born: 24 June 1957 Słupsk, Poland
- Died: 8 December 2018 (aged 61) Poland
- Party: Law and Justice

Jolanta Irena Szczypińska (24 June 1957 – 8 December 2018) was a Polish politician.

== Biography ==
After professionally working as a nurse, she became a member of the Sejm (the lower House of Parliament) after Wiesław Walendziak had stepped down in March 2004. On 25 September 2005 she was a candidate for the 26th Gdynia district, running on the Law and Justice list, and was elected Sejm member, as well as on 21 October 2007, on 9 October 2011 and on 25 October 2015.

In 2007, following rumours that she was in relationship with Poland's prime minister Jarosław Kaczyński, the airline Ryanair launched an advertising campaign which pictured the two politicians under the headline Are they planning a honeymoon trip? Szczypińska took legal action to prevent publication.

== See also ==
- List of Sejm members (2005–07)
- List of Sejm members (2007–11)
- List of Sejm members (2011–15)
- List of Sejm members (2015–19)
