= Marian Piłka =

Polish politician (born 1954)

member of Sejm 2005-2007
- In office 25 September 2005 – 2007

Personal details
- Born: 1954 (age 71–72)
- Party: Right of the Republic

Marian Piłka (Polish pronunciation: [ˈmarʲan ˈpʲiwka]; born 16 June 1954 in Trąbki, Masovian Voivodeship) is a Polish politician. He was elected to the Sejm on 25 September 2005, getting 14,761 votes in 18 Siedlce district as a candidate from the Law and Justice list.

He was also a member of Sejm 1991-1993, Sejm 1997-2001, and Sejm 2001-2005.

On 20 April 2007 he joined the new conservative party, the Right of the Republic.

== See also ==
- Members of Polish Sejm 2005-2007
