= Ryszard Nowak =

Polish politician

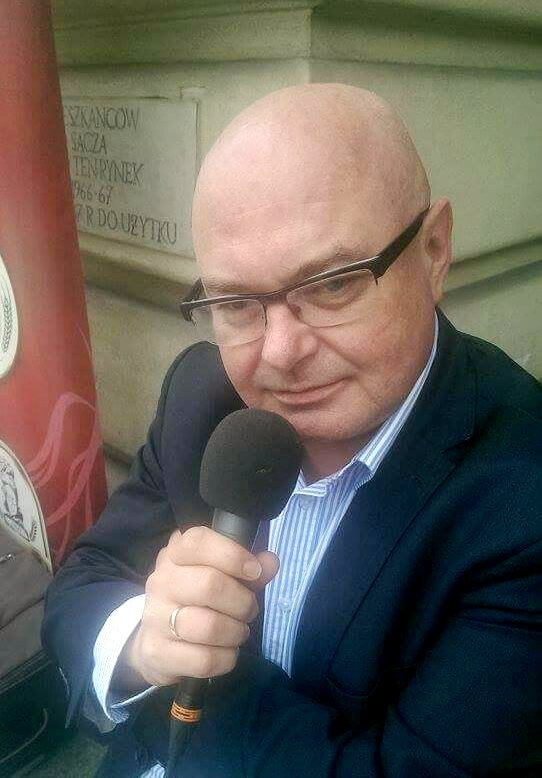

Deputy of the Sejm
- In office 2001 – 2005
- Constituency: 14 Nowy Sącz

Personal details
- Born: Ryszard Aleksander Nowak; 12 September 1962 (age 63) Nowy Sącz, Polish People's Republic
- Political party: Law and Justice

Ryszard Nowak (born 12 September 1962 in Nowy Sącz) is a Polish politician and a member of Law and Justice party. He was elected to the Sejm in 2001. He was the president of Nowy Sącz from 2006 to 2018.
