= Marek Łatas =

Polish politician (born 1960)

Marek Jerzy Łatas

Member of the Sejm
- Incumbent
- Assumed office 25 September 2005
- Constituency: 12 – Chrzanów

Personal details
- Born: 20 April 1960 (age 65)
- Party: Law and Justice

Marek Jerzy Łatas (born 20 April 1960 in Myślenice) is a Polish politician. He was elected to Sejm on 25 September 2005, getting 9549 votes in 12 Chrzanów district as a candidate from the Law and Justice list.

== See also ==
- Members of Polish Sejm 2005-2007
