= Maria Nowak (politician) =

Polish politician (born 1950)

Maria Teresa Nowak

Member of the Sejm
- Incumbent
- Assumed office 25 September 2005
- Constituency: 31 – Katowice

Personal details
- Born: 31 March 1950 (age 76)
- Party: Law and Justice
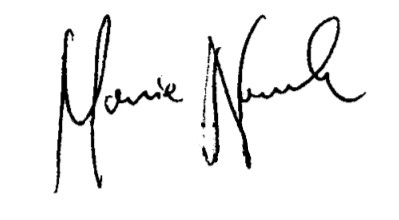
- Signature

Maria Teresa Nowak (born 31 March 1950 in Chorzów) is a Polish politician. She was elected to the Sejm on 25 September 2005, getting 9866 votes in 31 Katowice district as a candidate from the Law and Justice list.

She was also a member of Sejm 2001-2005.

== See also ==
- Members of Polish Sejm 2005-2007
