= Ryszard Wawryniewicz =

Polish politician (born 1962)

member of Sejm 2005-2007
- In office 25 September 2005 – ?

Personal details
- Born: 18 January 1962 (age 64)
- Party: Law and Justice

Ryszard Jan Wawryniewicz (born 18 January 1962) is a Polish politician.

Wawryniewicz was born in Wałbrzych. He was elected to the Sejm on 25 September 2005, getting 7663 votes in 2 Wałbrzych district as a candidate from the Law and Justice list.

He was also a member of Sejm 1997-2001.

== See also ==
- Members of Polish Sejm 2005-2007
