= Mirosława Masłowska =

Polish politician (1943–2023)

member of Sejm 2005-2007
- In office 19 October 2005 – 7 September 2007

Personal details
- Born: 20 October 1943 Warsaw, General Government (now Poland)
- Died: 29 May 2023 (aged 79) Szczecin, Poland
- Party: Law and Justice
- Education: Pomeranian Medical University in Szczecin

Mirosława Jolanta Masłowska (20 October 1943 – 29 May 2023) was a Polish politician and surgeon. She was elected to the Sejm on 25 September 2005, with 7,675 votes in 41 Szczecin district as a candidate from the Law and Justice list.

Masłowska died in Szczecin on 29 May 2023, at the age of 79.

== See also ==
- Members of Polish Sejm 2005-2007
