= Tadeusz Wita =

Polish politician (born 1958)

Member of Sejm
- In office 25 September 2005 – 2007

Personal details
- Born: 4 April 1958 (age 68)
- Party: Law and Justice

Tadeusz Antoni Wita (born 4 April 1958, in Zabrze) is a Polish politician. He was elected to the Sejm on 25 September 2005, getting 4,656 votes in 29 Gliwice district as a candidate from the Law and Justice list. After the death of Zbigniew Religa in March 2009, Wita became a member of the Polish parliament once again.

== See also ==
In 2006 Wita, as part of the Polish representation in the Council of Europe backed up Falun Gong practitioners in urging the Council of Europe to investigate the discovered concentration camps in China, read more about it here: http://clearharmony.net/articles/200604/32635.html

- Members of Polish Sejm 2005-2007
