= Jarosław Sellin =

Polish politician and journalist

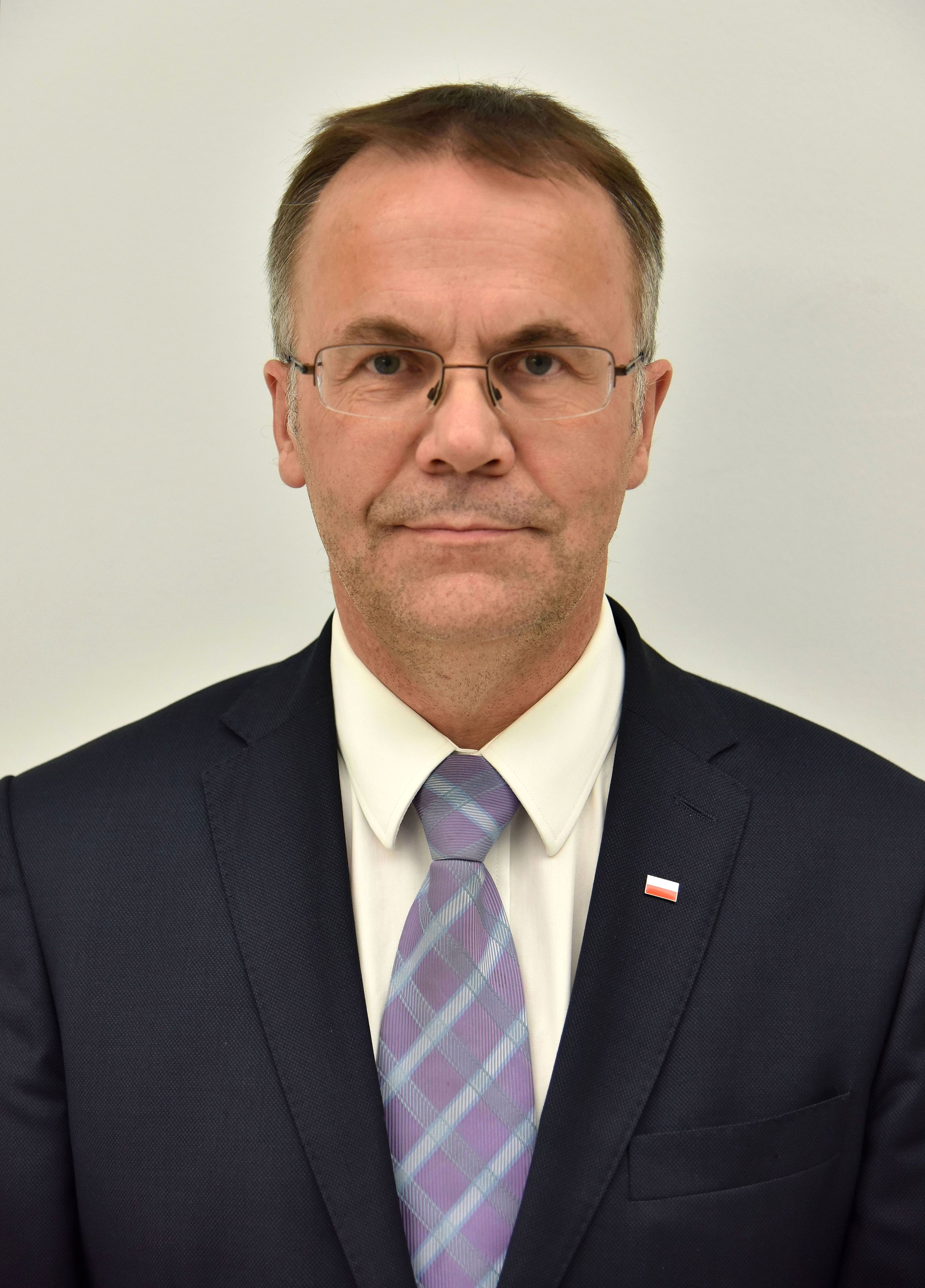

member of Sejm 2005-2007
- In office 25 September 2005 – ?

Personal details
- Born: 1 May 1963 (age 63) Gdynia
- Party: Law and Justice
- Education: University of Gdańsk

Jarosław Daniel Sellin (born 1 May 1963 in Gdynia) is a Polish politician and journalist. He was elected to the Sejm, the lower house of Polish parliament, on 25 September 2005, getting 18,097 votes in 26 Gdynia district as a candidate from the Law and Justice list.

== See also ==
- Members of Polish Sejm 2005–2007
