= Mieczysław Walkiewicz =

Polish politician (born 1949)

member of Sejm 2005-2007
- In office 25 September 2005 – 2007

Personal details
- Born: 1949 (age 76–77)
- Party: Law and Justice

Mieczysław Walkiewicz (born 5 November 1949 in Nowa Wólka) is a Polish politician. He was elected to the Sejm on 25 September 2005, getting 4634 votes in 21 Opole district as a candidate from the Law and Justice list.

== See also ==
- Members of Polish Sejm 2005-2007
