= Jan Zubowski =

Polish politician (born 1957)

member of Sejm 2005-2007
- In office 25 September 2005 – 2007

Personal details
- Born: 1957 (age 68–69)
- Party: Law and Justice

Jan Kazimierz Zubowski (born 8 November 1957 in Oława) is a Polish politician. He was elected to Sejm on 25 September 2005, getting 5,813 votes in 1 Legnica district as a candidate from the Law and Justice list. In 2006, he was elected the mayor of Głogów, and in 2010 re-elected for his second term.

== See also ==
- Members of Polish Sejm 2005-2007
