= Barbara Bubula =

Polish politician (born 1963)

member of Sejm 2005-2007
- Incumbent
- Assumed office 25 September 2005

Personal details
- Born: 4 March 1963 (age 63) Kraków
- Party: Law and Justice

Barbara Ewa Bubula (born 4 March 1963 in Kraków) is a Polish politician. She was elected to Sejm on 25 September 2005, getting 2832 votes in 13 Kraków district as a candidate from the Law and Justice list.

== See also ==
- Members of Polish Sejm 2005-2007
