= Stanisław Szwed =

Polish politician (born 1955)

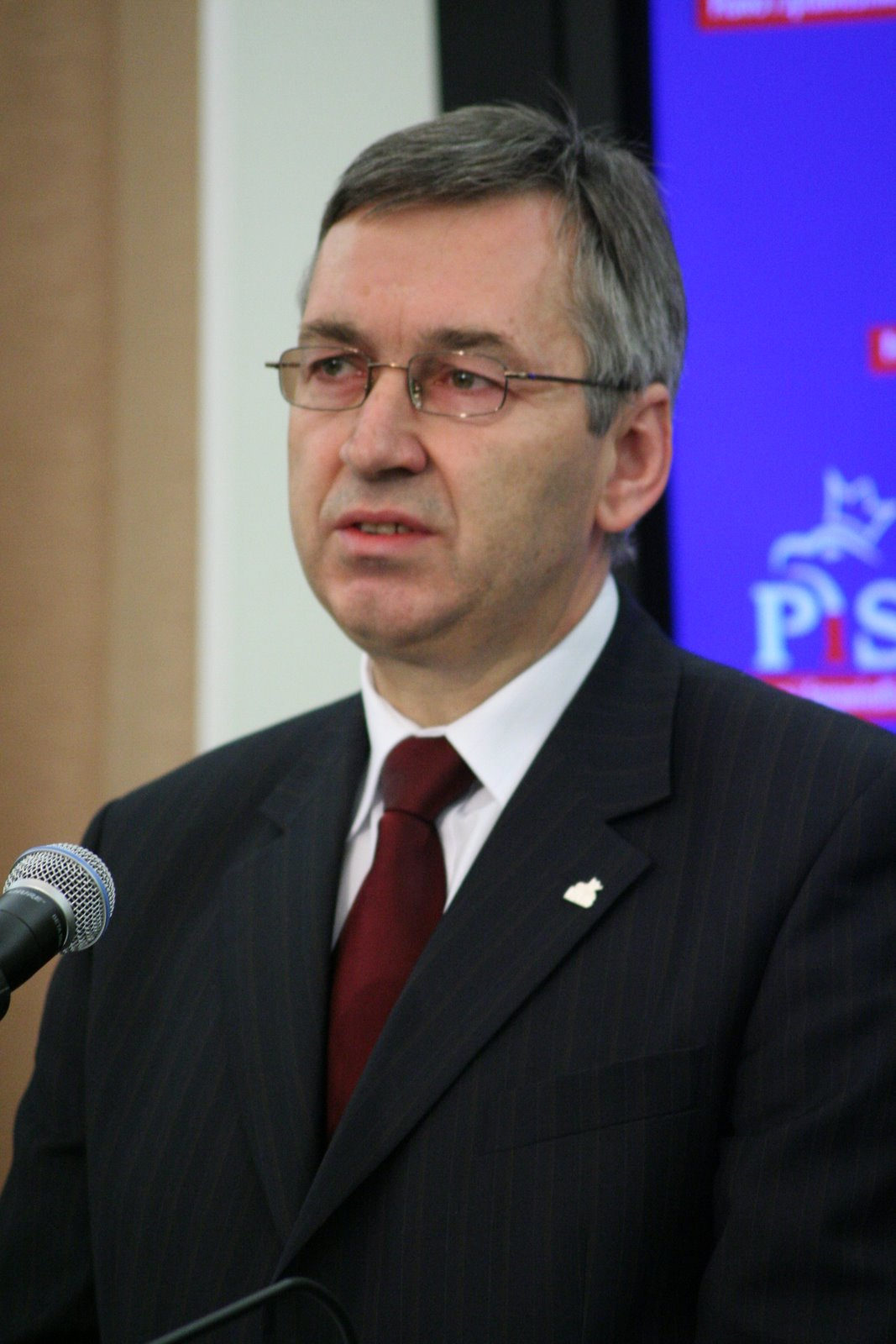

Member of the Sejm
- Incumbent
- Assumed office 12 November 2019

Personal details
- Born: 12 April 1955 (age 71) Bielsko-Biała, Polish People's Republic
- Party: Law and Justice
- Education: Andrzej Frycz Modrzewski Krakow University
- Profession: politician
- Website: https://stanislawszwed.pl/

Stanisław Szwed (born 12 April 1955 in Bielsko-Biała) is a Polish politician. He was elected to the Sejm on 13 October 2019, getting 65,315 votes in the 27 Bielsko-Biała district as a candidate from the Law and Justice list.

He was also a member of Sejm 1997-2001.

== See also ==
- Members of Polish Sejm 2005-2007
