= Konrad Szymański =

Polish politician

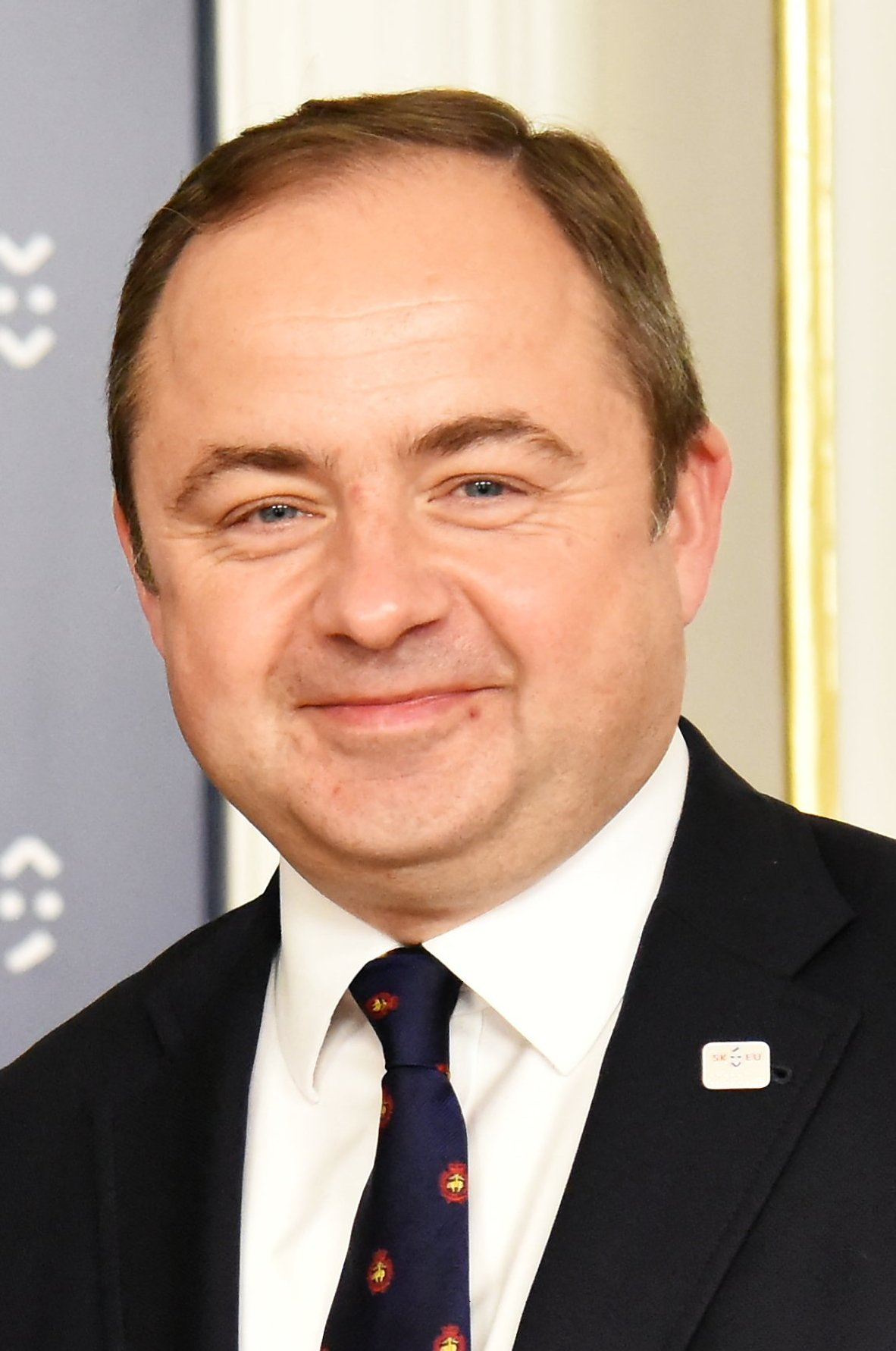
- Konrad Szymański in 2016

Secretary of State for European Affairs
- In office November 2015 – 13 October 2022
- Prime Minister: Beata Szydło
- Preceded by: Rafał Trzaskowski

Personal details
- Born: 6 December 1969 (age 56) Kalisz, Poland
- Party: Law and Justice
- Education: Adam Mickiewicz University in Poznań

Konrad Krzysztof Szymański (born 6 December 1969) is a Polish politician who was Minister for European Affairs from 2015 to 2022.

== Biography ==
Szymański was growing up in Kalisz. He earned a Master of Law at Adam Mickiewicz University in Poznań in 1995. He was an advisor to the Deputy Marshall of the Sejm from 1999 to 2000, subsequently serving in the Political Cabinet of the Prime Minister of Poland.

From 2004 to 2014, he was a Member of the European Parliament for the Lower Silesian Voivodship & Opole Voivodship with the Law and Justice party, part of the European Conservatives and Reformists group. Szymański sat on the European Parliament's Committee on Foreign Affairs and its Committee on Women's Rights and Gender Equality. He was a substitute on the Committee on Civil Liberties, Justice and Home Affairs and a member of the delegation for relations with Belarus. In 2013 and 2014, Polityka and Rzeczpospolita respectively voted him one of the best Polish members of the European Parliament.

On 9 November 2015, Szymański was appointed the Polish Secretary of State for European Affairs at the Ministry of Foreign Affairs.

He resigned in October 2022.
