= Andrzej Liss =

Polish politician (1950–2019)

Member of Sejm
- In office 2002–2007

Personal details
- Born: 9 June 1950 Pelplin, Gdańsk Voivodeship, Republic of Poland
- Died: 21 January 2019 (aged 68) Tczew, Pomeranian Voivodeship, Third Polish Republic
- Party: Law and Justice

Andrzej Marcelin Liss (9 June 1950 – 21 January 2019) was a Polish politician.

== Career ==
He was elected to the Sejm on 25 September 2005, getting 5674 votes in 25 Gdańsk district as a candidate from the Law and Justice list.

He was also a member of Sejm 2001-2005.

== See also ==
- Members of Polish Sejm 2005-2007
