= Tomasz Latos =

Polish politician (born 1964)

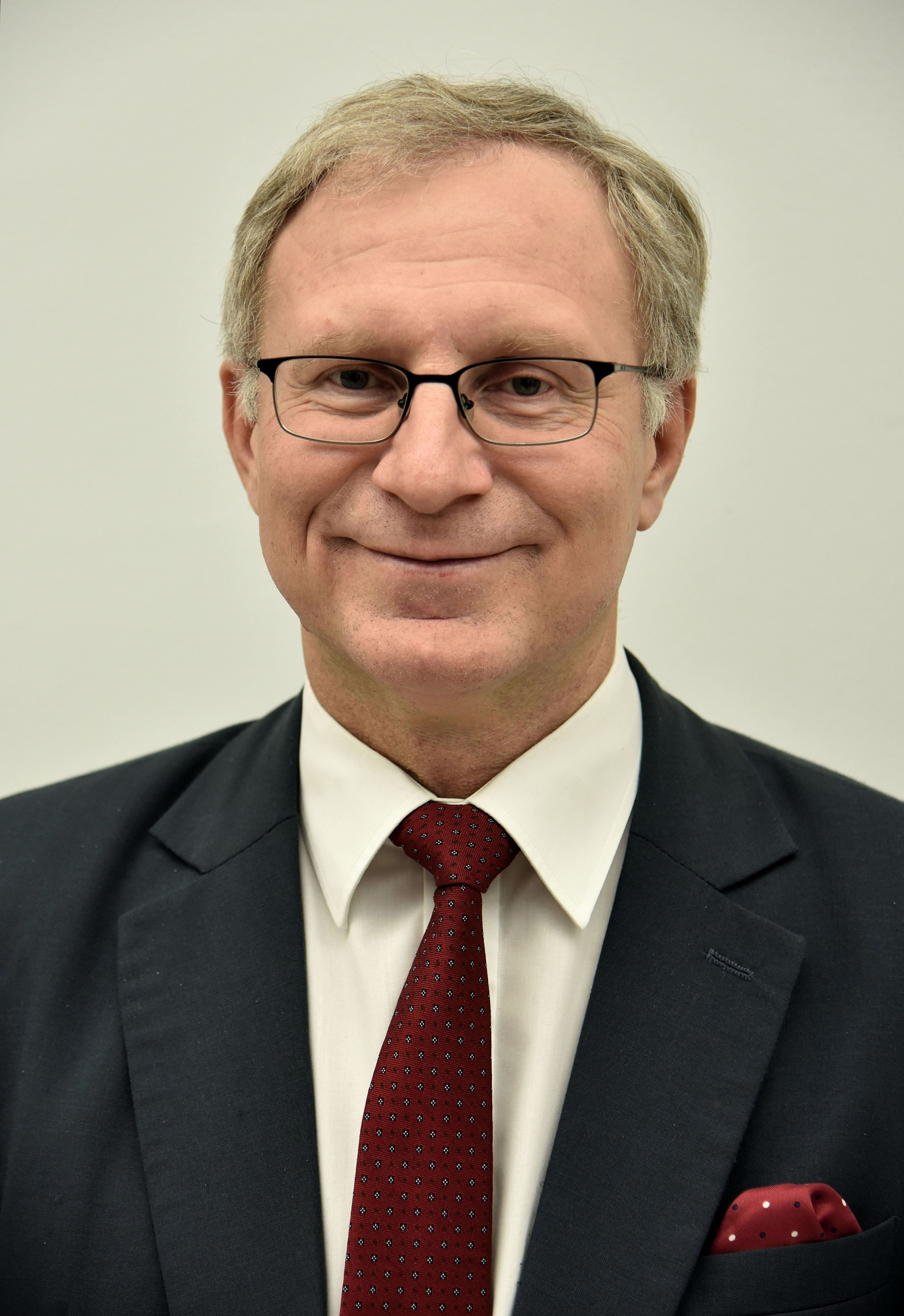

Member of Sejm of Poland
- Incumbent
- Assumed office V term: 2005-09-25 – 2007-11-05; VI term: 2007-11-06
- Constituency: 4th (Bydgoszcz)

Bydgoszcz City Councillor
- In office III term: 1998–2002; IV term: 2002 – 2005-10-12
- Constituency: 2nd district

Personal details
- Born: March 8, 1964 (age 62) Poznań, Poland
- Party: Law and Justice

Tomasz Edward Latos (born 8 March 1964 in Poznań) is a Polish politician, who has been a member of the Sejm of Poland since 2005. Between 1998 and 2005, he was a Bydgoszcz City Councillor.

== Early life ==
He graduated from Jan and Jędrzej Śniadecki Secondary School No 6 in Bydgoszcz. Then he was a student at the Medical University in Poznań (Polish: Akadema Medyczna w Poznaniu), currently Poznan University of Medical Sciences.

== Political career ==
=== City Councillors (1998-2005) ===
In 1998 election he joined the Bydgoszcz City Council III term. In 2002 election he was re-elected to the City Council (IV term) representing the 2nd district. He polled 2,274 votes and was first on the Law and Justice list (Polish: Prawo i Sprawiedliwość).

=== Sejm member (since 2005) ===
In 2005 parliamentary election he joined the Sejm of Poland V term (lower house of the Polish parliament) representing the 4 Bydgoszcz district. He polled 10,059 votes.

In 2007 parliamentary election he was re-elected to the Sejm of Poland VI term from the 4th constituency (Bydgoszcz). He polled 17,751 votes and was second on the Law and Justice list (Prawo i Sprawiedliwość).

In 2009 European Parliament election he is a candidate of Law and Justice (Prawo i Sprawiedliwość) from Kuyavian-Pomeranian constituency.

== See also ==
- List of Sejm members (2005–2007)
- List of Sejm members (2007–2011)
