= Anna Sobecka =

Polish politician (born 1951)

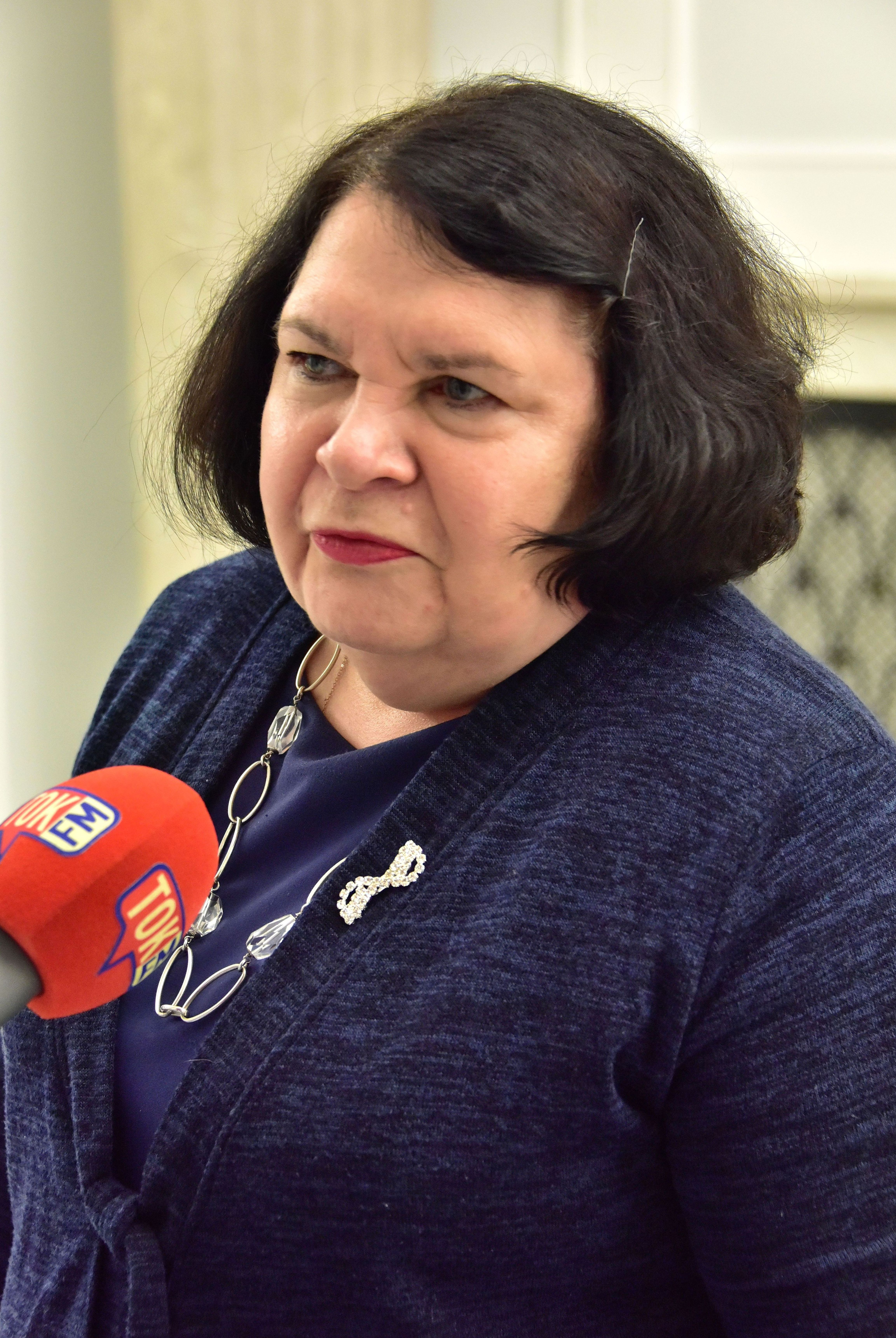

Member of the Sejm
- In office 20 October 1997 – 12 October 2019
- Constituency: 5 – Toruń

Personal details
- Born: 27 March 1951 (age 75)
- Party: Law and Justice
- Other political affiliations: Solidarity Electoral Action (1997–01); League of Polish Families (2001–7)

Anna Elżbieta Sobecka (born 27 March 1951 in Piotrków Kujawski) is a Polish Member of Parliament. She was elected to the Sejm on 25 September 2005, getting 13,761 votes in 5 Toruń district as a candidate on the League of Polish Families list. Currently she is a Law and Justice party member. She regularly appears on Radio Maryja and Telewizja Trwam.

She was also a member of The Polish Sejm from 1997 to 2019 when she failed to get re-elected.

She gained some fame in Poland for her quote "Sex is bad as it doesn't develop the mankind". Sobacka is also a vigorous opponent of legalizing same-sex unions. She claims homosexuality is an illness and homosexuals are sick people, and that homosexual orientation is caused by "lack of love during childhood".

== See also ==
- Members of Polish Sejm 2005–2007
