= Wojciech Szarama =

Polish politician (born 1955)

Wojciech Piotr Szarama
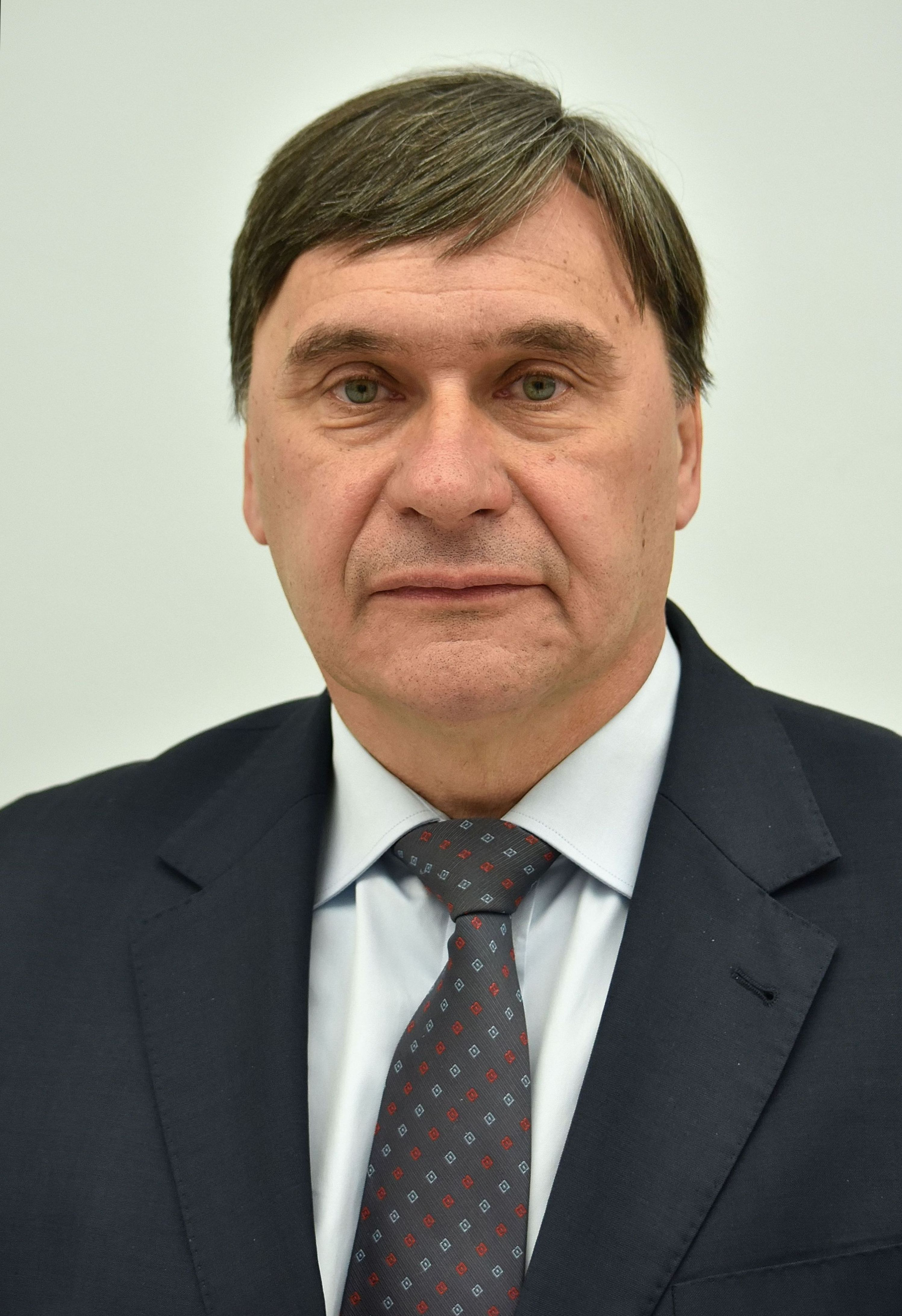

member of Sejm 2005-2007
- In office 25 September 2005 – ?

Personal details
- Born: 16 December 1955 (age 70) Bytom, Poland
- Party: Law and Justice

Wojciech Piotr Szarama (born 16 December 1955 in Bytom) is a Polish politician. He was elected to Sejm on 25 September 2005, getting 9280 votes in 29 Gliwice district as a candidate from the Law and Justice list.

He was also a member of Sejm 2001-2005, 2005-2007, 2007-2011, 2011–2015, 2015-2019, 2019-2023.

== See also ==
- Members of Polish Sejm 2005-2007
