= Jarosław Żaczek =

Polish politician

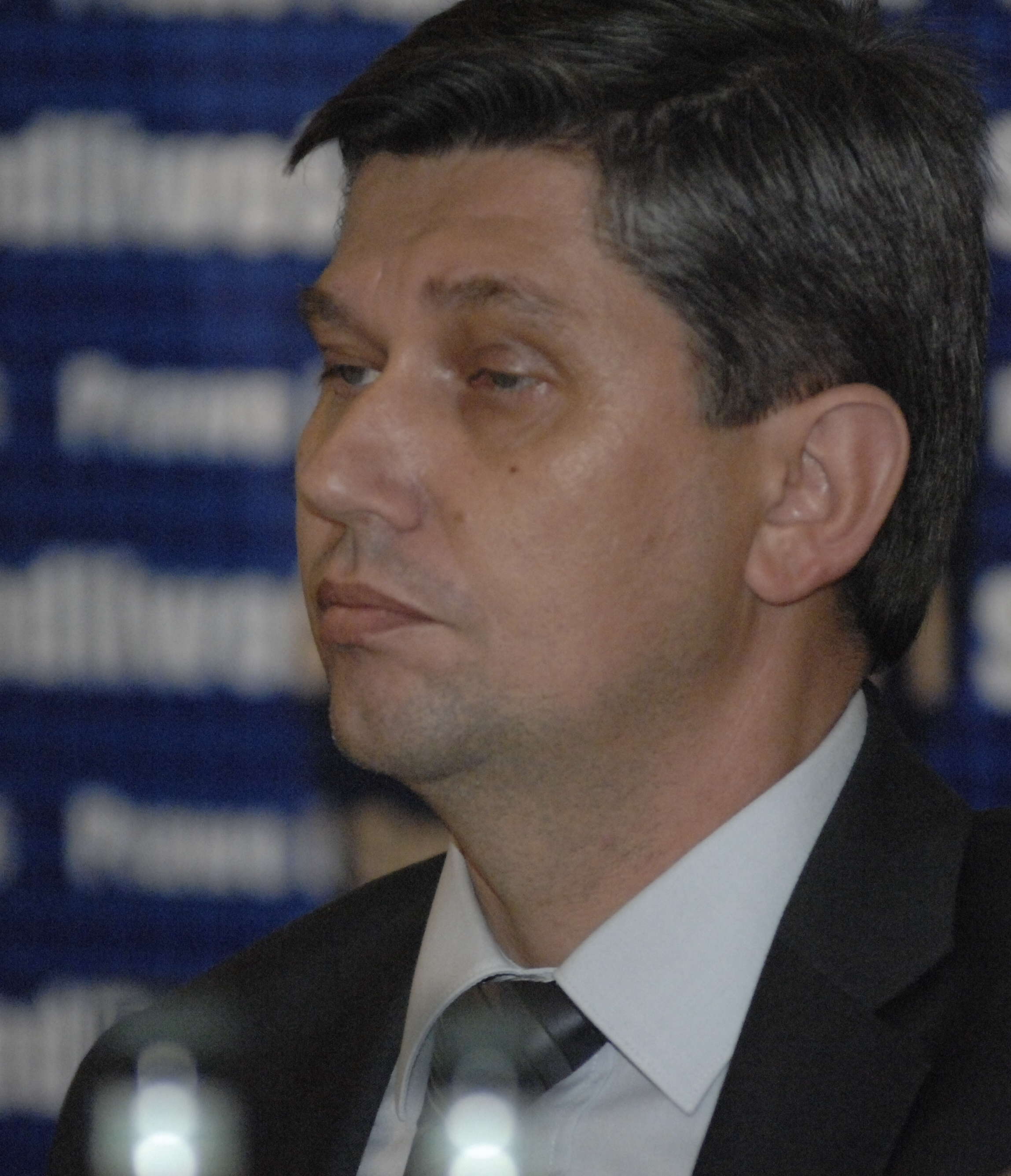

Member of the Sejm
- Incumbent
- Assumed office 25 September 2005
- Constituency: 6 – Lublin

Personal details
- Born: 14 May 1967 (age 58) Ryki
- Party: Law and Justice

Jarosław Żaczek (born 14 May 1967, in Ryki) is a Polish politician. He was elected to Sejm on 25 September 2005 after receiving 6246 votes in the 6 Lublin district as the Law and Justice candidate.

== See also ==
- Members of Polish Sejm 2005-2007
