= Jan Szyszko =

Polish politician (1944–2019)

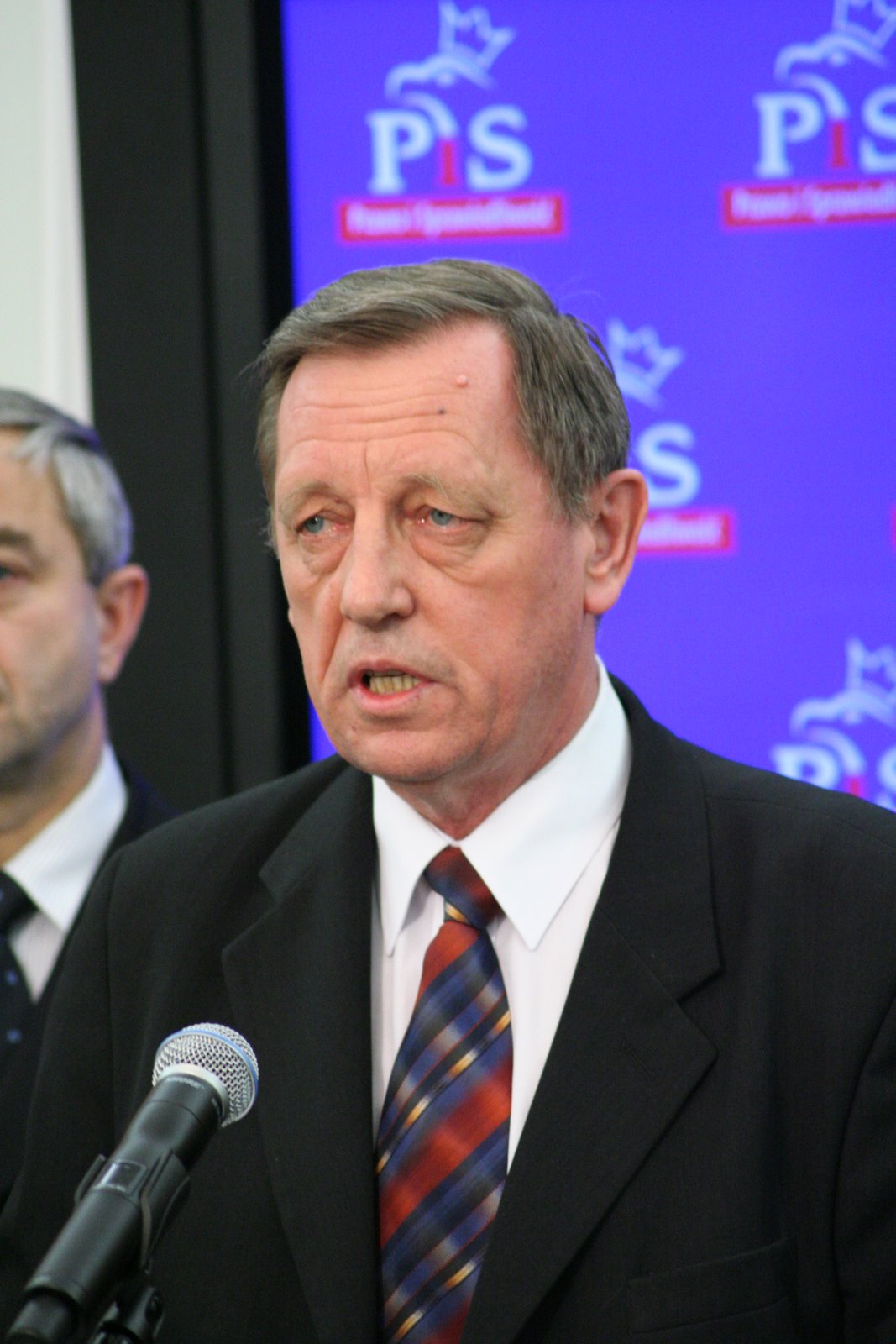

Member of the Sejm
- In office 25 September 2005 – 9 October 2019
- Constituency: 20 – Warsaw II

Minister of Environment
- In office 16 November 2015 – 9 January 2018
- Prime Minister: Beata Szydło; Mateusz Morawiecki
- In office 31 October 2005 – 16 November 2007
- Prime Minister: Kazimierz Marcinkiewicz; Jarosław Kaczyński
- In office 31 October 1997 – 19 October 1999
- Prime Minister: Jerzy Buzek

Personal details
- Born: Jan Feliks Szyszko; 14 April 1944 Stara Miłosna, Warsaw, Poland
- Died: 9 October 2019 (aged 75)
- Party: Law and Justice
- Education: Warsaw University of Life Sciences

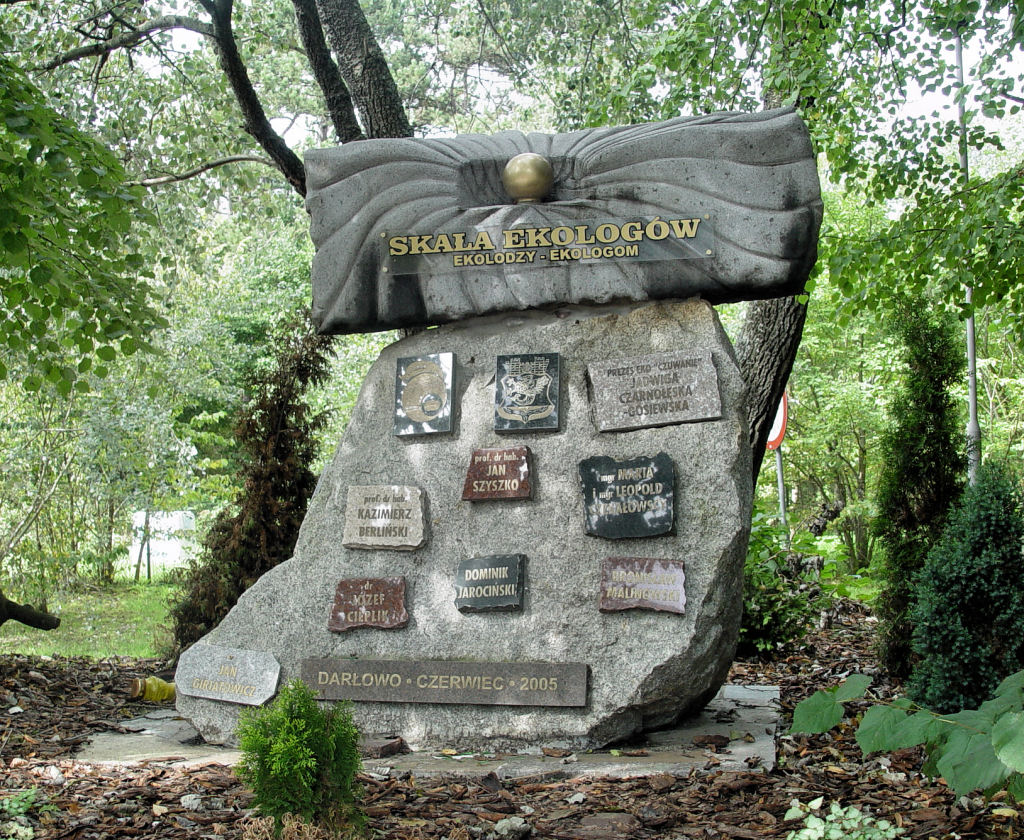
The Rock of the Ecologists in Darłowo

Jan Feliks Szyszko (Polish pronunciation: [jan ʂɨʂkɔ]; 19 April 1944 – 9 October 2019) was a Polish forester, university teacher (professor of forestry) and politician who served as Minister of Environment in the cabinets of Jerzy Buzek (1997–1999), Kazimierz Marcinkiewicz (2005–2007), Jarosław Kaczyński (2007), Beata Szydło (2015–2017) and Mateusz Morawiecki (2017–2018).

He was elected to the Sejm on 25 September 2005, receiving 7,042 votes in the 20th Warsaw district, as a candidate on the Law and Justice list. He served in four consecutive parliamentary terms, having won re-election in 2007, 2011 and 2015.

The Pontifical Academy of Sciences recognized him with the 2008 Ettore Majorana–Erice–Science for Peace Prize. He was an honorary citizen of Krościenko nad Dunajcem and of Wieluń.

== See also ==
- Members of Polish Sejm 2005–2007
