= Waldemar Wiązowski =

Polish politician (born 1944)

Member of the Sejm
- In office 25 September 2005 – 4 November 2007
- Constituency: 2 – Wałbrzych
- In office 20 October 1997 – 18 October 2001

Personal details
- Born: 25 December 1944 (age 81) Pionki
- Party: Law and Justice

Waldemar Bogdan Wiązowski (born 25 December 1944 in Pionki) is a Polish politician. He was elected to the Sejm on 25 September 2005, getting 9751 votes in 2 Wałbrzych district as a candidate from the Law and Justice list.

He was also a member of Sejm 1997-2001.

== See also ==
- Members of Polish Sejm 2005-2007
