= Bogusław Bosak =

Polish politician (born 1968)

member of Sejm 2005-2007
- Incumbent
- Assumed office 25 September 2005

Personal details
- Born: 1968 (age 57–58)
- Party: Law and Justice

Bogusław Bosak (born 6 July 1968 in Krosno) is a Polish politician. He was elected to the Sejm on 25 September 2005, getting 2607 votes in 13 Kraków district as a candidate from the Law and Justice list.

== See also ==
- Members of Polish Sejm 2005-2007
