= Tadeusz Cymański =

Polish politician (born 1955)

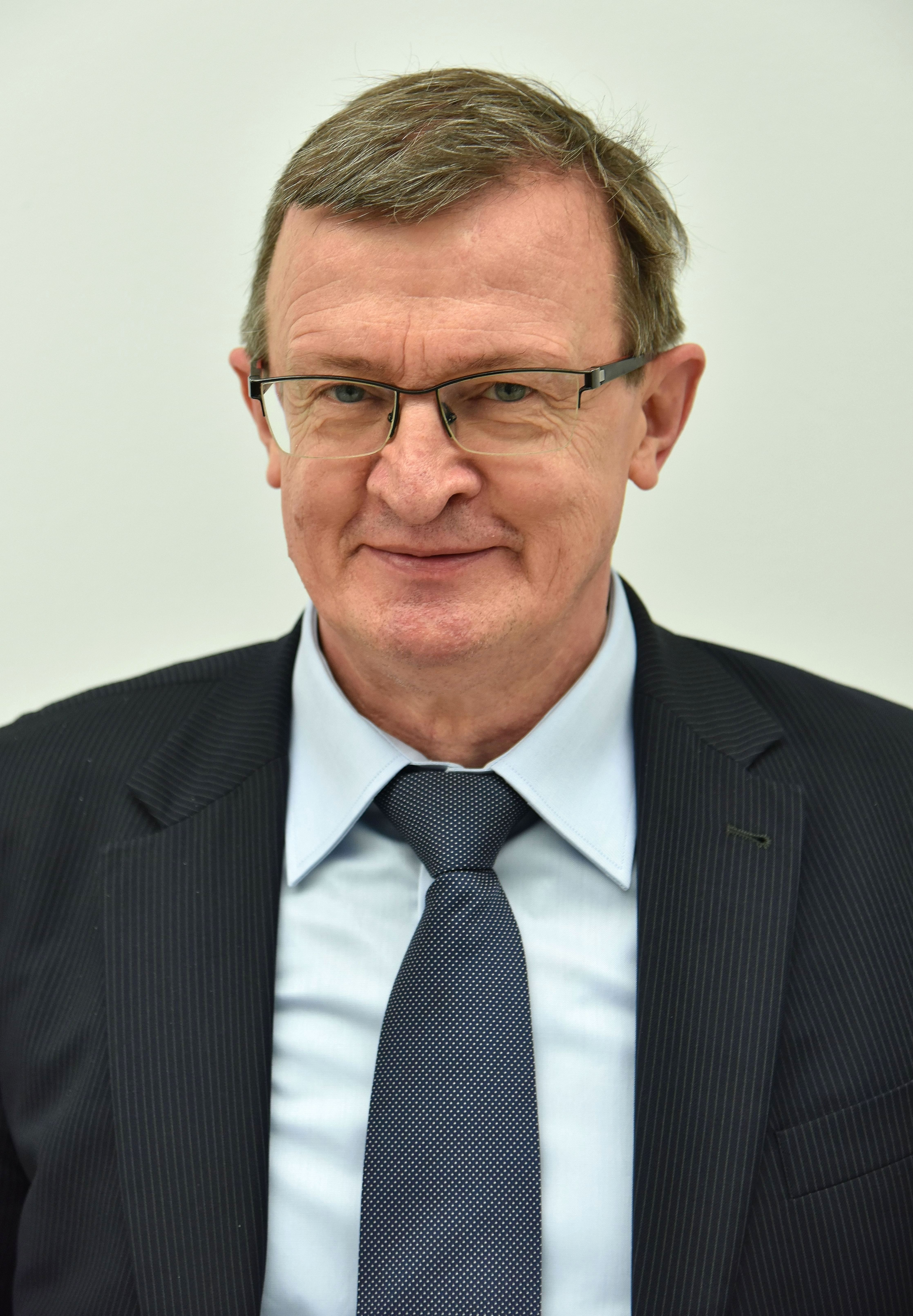

Member of the Sejm
- In office 25 September 2005 – 10 June 2009
- Constituency: 25 – Gdańsk

Personal details
- Born: 6 June 1955 (age 71) Nowy Staw
- Party: Law and Justice
- Children: 5
- Education: University of Gdańsk

Tadeusz Cymański ([ˈtadɛuʂ ˈt͡sɨmaɲski]; born 6 June 1955 in Nowy Staw) is a Polish conservative politician. He was elected to the Sejm on 25 September 2005 getting 23,518 votes in 25 Gdańsk district, as a candidate from the Law and Justice list.

He was also a member of Sejm 1997-2001 and Sejm 2001-2005.

In the 2015 elections he was re-elected to the Sejm, receiving 13,126 votes from the Law and Justice list in the Gdansk district In the local elections in the year 2024, he was elected to the Malbork County Council.

== See also ==
- Members of Polish Sejm 2005-2007
