= Szymon Giżyński =

Polish politician (born 1956)

Szymon Stanisław Giżyński
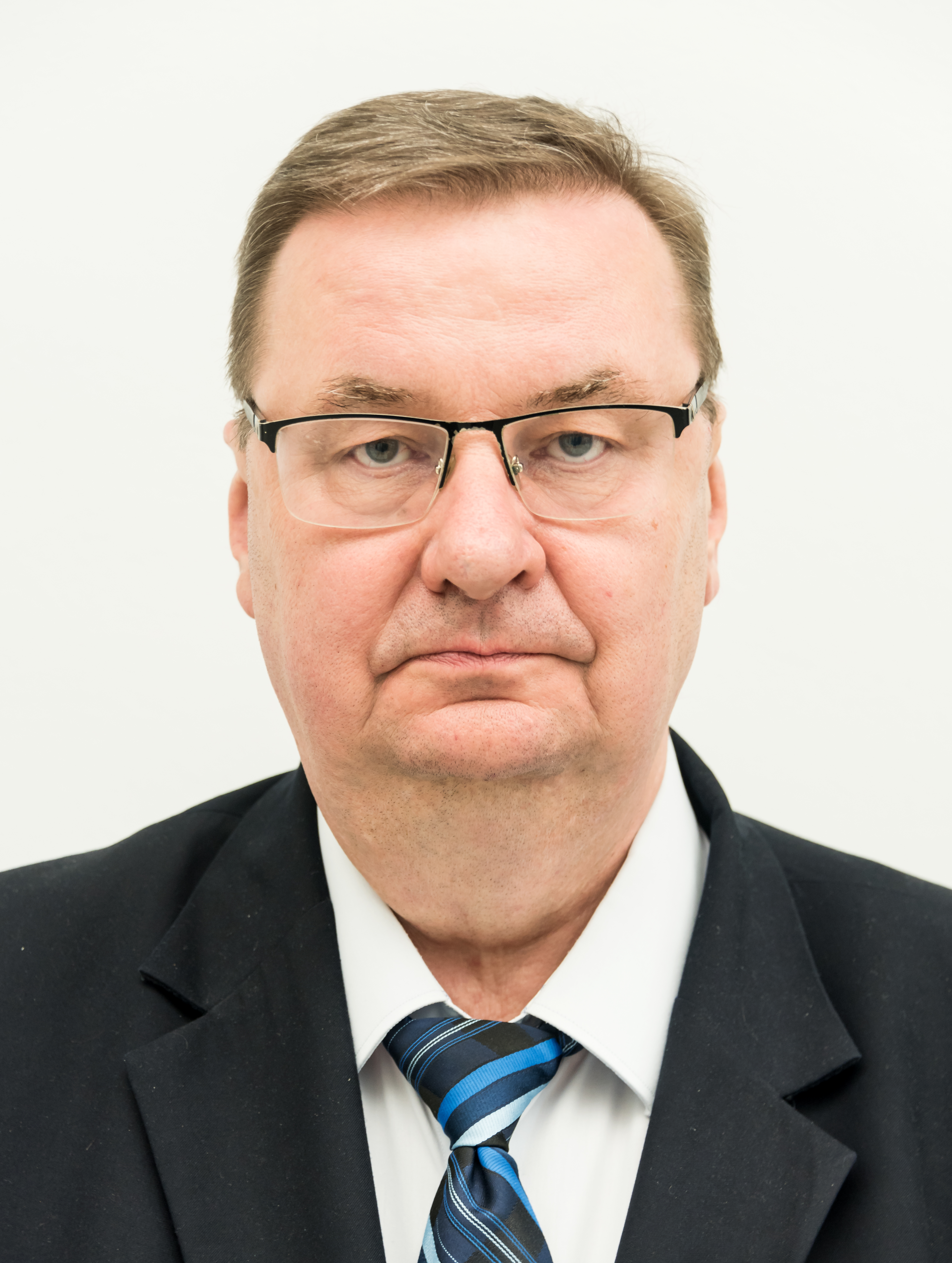
- Giżyński in 2022

Member of Sejm 2019-2023
- Incumbent
- Assumed office 2001

Voivode of Częstochowa Voivodeship
- In office December 1997 – December 1998
- Preceded by: Cezary Marek Graj
- Succeeded by: Position abolished

Personal details
- Born: 8 March 1956 (age 70) Częstochowa
- Party: Law and Justice
- Other political affiliations: Solidarity Electoral Action
- Education: University of Silesia

Szymon Stanisław Giżyński (born 8 March 1956 in Częstochowa) is a Polish politician.

== Biography ==
He graduated from the Faculty of Philology at the University of Silesia in Katowice. After 1990, he was a member of the Centre Agreement, the Movement for the Commonwealth, AWS. In 2001 he joined the Law and Justice. He was the last voivode of Częstochowa in 1997–1998. In 2006 he started for the office of the President of Częstochowa, obtaining the fourth result (12.56%).

In 2001, 2005, 2007, 2011, 2015 and 2019 he obtained a parliamentary mandate in the Częstochowa district.
