= Bartłomiej Szrajber =

Polish politician (born 1954)

Deputy of the Sejm
- In office 2006 – 2007
- Preceded by: Mariusz Kamiński
- In office 2001 – 2005
- Constituency: 19 Warsaw I

Personal details
- Born: Bartłomiej Józef Szrajber; 27 May 1954 (age 72) Warsaw, Polish People's Republic
- Party: Law and Justice
- Education: AWF Karol Świerczewski (1983)

Bartłomiej Józef Szrajber (born 27 May 1954 in Warsaw) is a Polish politician, member of Law and Justice party. He was elected to Sejm in 2001, and served again from 2006–2007.
