= Monika Ryniak =

Polish politician (born 1960)

Member of the Sejm
- In office 25 September 2005 – 7 November 2011
- Constituency: 13 – Kraków

Personal details
- Born: 24 January 1960 (age 66)
- Party: Law and Justice

Monika Ryniak (born 24 January 1960 in Myślenice) is a Polish politician. She was elected to the Sejm on 25 September 2005, getting 2193 votes in 13 Kraków district as a candidate from the Law and Justice list.

== See also ==
- Members of Polish Sejm 2005-2007
