= List of Sejm members (2007–2011) =

6th term of the Sejm

The sixth term of the Government of the Republic of Poland is the term of the Government that ran from 5 November 2007 to 7 November 2011.

Elections were held on 21 October 2007 to the Sejm, with all 460 members being elected.

18 members of this term were killed in office in the Smolensk air disaster.

== Officers ==
	Name	Party	Notes
Senior Marshal	Zbigniew Religa	Law and Justice	
Marshal	Grzegorz Schetyna	Civic Platform	
Deputy Marshals	Stefan Niesiołowski	Civic Platform	
Deputy Marshals	Marek Kuchciński	Law and Justice	
Deputy Marshals	Jerzy Wenderlich	Democratic Left Alliance	
Deputy Marshals	Ewa Kierzkowska	Polish People's Party	

== Members of Sejm ==
Name	Party	Constituency	Notes
Adam Abramowicz	Law and Justice	7 – Chełm	
Andrzej Adamczyk	Law and Justice		
Romuald Ajchler	Social Democracy of Poland		
Leszek Aleksandrzak	Democratic Left Alliance		
Bartosz Arłukowicz	Social Democracy of Poland		
Waldemar Andzel	Law and Justice		
Iwona Arent	Law and Justice		
Tadeusz Arkit	Civic Platform		
Paweł Arndt	Civic Platform		
Marek Ast	Law and Justice	8 – Zielona Góra	
Urszula Augustyn	Civic Platform		
Tadeusz Aziewicz	Civic Platform		
Zbigniew Babalski	Law and Justice		
Piotr Babinetz	Law and Justice		
Dariusz Bąk	Law and Justice		
Klaudiusz Balcerzak	Civic Platform	8 – Zielona Góra	Replaced Marek Cebula on 14 December 2010.
Marek Balicki	Social Democracy of Poland		
Anna Bańkowska	Social Democracy of Poland	4 – Bydgoszcz	
Barbara Bartuś	Law and Justice		
Andrzej Bętkowski	Law and Justice		
Marek Biernacki	Civic Platform		
Andrzej Biernat	Civic Platform		
Antoni Błądek	Law and Justice		
Mariusz Błaszczak	Law and Justice		
Anita Błochowiak	Democratic Left Alliance		
Jacek Bogucki	Law and Justice		
Bogdan Bojko	Civic Platform	8 – Zielona Góra	
Marek Borowski	Social Democracy of Poland		
Krzysztof Brejza	Civic Platform	4 – Bydgoszcz	
Roman Brodniak	Civic Platform	1 – Legnica	
Joachim Brudziński	Law and Justice		
Jacek Brzezinka	Civic Platform		
Beata Bublewicz	Civic Platform		
Jerzy Budnik	Civic Platform		
Bożenna Bukiewicz	Civic Platform	8 – Zielona Góra	
Andrzej Buła	Civic Platform		
Jan Bury	Polish People's Party		
Jan Bury	Law and Justice		
Renata Butryn	Civic Platform		
Marek Cebula	Civic Platform	8 – Zielona Góra	Resigned on 7 December 2010.
Andrzej Celiński	Social Democracy of Poland		
Zbigniew Chlebowski	Civic Platform	2 – Wałbrzych	
Aleksander Chłopek	Law and Justice		
Stanisław Chmielewski	Civic Platform		
Zbigniew Chmielowiec	Law and Justice		
Janusz Chwierut	Civic Platform		
Janusz Cichoń	Civic Platform		
Grażyna Ciemniak	Democratic Left Alliance	4 – Bydgoszcz	Replaced Janusz Zemke on 24 June 2009.
Leszek Cieślik	Civic Platform		
Andrzej Ćwierz	Law and Justice		
Piotr Cybulski	Law and Justice	1 – Legnica	
Tadeusz Cymański	Law and Justice		
Witold Czarnecki	Law and Justice		
Arkadiusz Czartoryski	Law and Justice		
Czesław Czechyra	Civic Platform		
Andrzej Czerwiński	Civic Platform		
Edward Czesak	Law and Justice		
Zdzisław Czucha	Civic Platform		
Andrzej Czuma	Civic Platform		
Eugeniusz Czykwin	Democratic Left Alliance		
Lena Dąbkowska-Cichocka	Law and Justice		
Alicja Dąbrowska	Civic Platform		
Andrzej Dera	Law and Justice		
Zbigniew Dolata	Law and Justice		
Grzegorz Dolniak	Civic Platform		
Ludwik Dorn	Law and Justice		
Marzenna Drab	Law and Justice	5 – Toruń	
Ewa Drozd	Civic Platform	1 – Legnica	
Mirosław Drzewiecki	Civic Platform		
Tomasz Dudziński	Law and Justice	7 – Chełm	Poland Comes First from 16 November 2010.
Artur Dunin	Civic Platform		
Zenon Durka	Civic Platform		
Bronisław Dutka	Polish People's Party		
Janusz Dzięcioł	Civic Platform	5 – Toruń	
Jan Dziedziczak	Law and Justice		
Waldy Dzikowski	Civic Platform		
Joanna Fabisiak	Civic Platform		
Jacek Falfus	Law and Justice		
Jerzy Fedorowicz	Civic Platform		
Arkady Fiedler	Civic Platform		
Marian Filar	Democratic Party – demokraci.pl	5 – Toruń	
Krzysztof Gadowski	Civic Platform		
Andrzej Gałażewski	Civic Platform		
Ryszard Galla	German Minority		
Tomasz Garbowski	Democratic Left Alliance		
Adam Gawęda	Law and Justice		
Stanisław Gawłowski	Civic Platform		
Magdalena Gąsior-Marek	Civic Platform	6 – Lublin	
Grażyna Gęsicka	Law and Justice		
Łukasz Gibała	Civic Platform		
Artur Gierada	Civic Platform		
Zyta Gilowska	Law and Justice		
Witold Gintowt-Dziewałtowski	Democratic Left Alliance		
Zbigniew Girzyński	Law and Justice	5 – Toruń	
Szymon Giżyński	Law and Justice		
Tomasz Głogowski	Civic Platform		
John Godson	Civic Platform		Since 2010.
Mieczysław Golba	Law and Justice		
Henryk Gołębiewski	Democratic Left Alliance	2 – Wałbrzych	
Marian Goliński	Law and Justice		
Kazimierz Gołojuch	Law and Justice		
Artur Górski	Law and Justice		
Tomasz Górski	Law and Justice		
Jerzy Gosiewski	Law and Justice		
Przemysław Gosiewski	Law and Justice		
Jarosław Gowin	Civic Platform		
Cezary Grabarczyk	Civic Platform		
Krystyna Grabicka	Law and Justice		
Aleksander Grad	Civic Platform		
Mariusz Grad	Civic Platform	7 – Chełm	
Paweł Graś	Civic Platform		
Rafał Grupiński	Civic Platform		
Krzysztof Grzegorek	Civic Platform		
Eugeniusz Grzeszczak	Polish People's Party		
Andrzej Grzyb	Polish People's Party		
Andrzej Gut-Mostowy	Civic Platform		
Iwona Guzowska	Civic Platform		
Kazimierz Gwiazdowski	Law and Justice		
Andrzej Halicki	Civic Platform		
Agnieszka Hanajczyk	Civic Platform		
Jolanta Hibner	Civic Platform		
Czesław Hoc	Law and Justice		
Adam Hofman	Law and Justice		
Stanisław Huskowski	Civic Platform	3 – Wrocław	
Tadeusz Iwiński	Democratic Left Alliance		
Dawid Jackiewicz	Law and Justice	3 – Wrocław	
Jarosław Jagiełło	Law and Justice		
Elżbieta Jakubiak	Law and Justice		
Wiesław Janczyk	Law and Justice		
Grzegorz Janik	Law and Justice		
Zdzisława Janowska	Social Democracy of Poland		
Tadeusz Jarmuziewicz	Civic Platform		
Michał Jaros	Civic Platform	3 – Wrocław	
Izabela Jaruga-Nowacka	Democratic Left Alliance		
Wojciech Jasiński	Law and Justice		
Danuta Jazłowiecka	Civic Platform		
Krzysztof Jurgiel	Law and Justice		
Dariusz Kaczanowski	Law and Justice		
Roman Kaczor	Civic Platform	3 – Wrocław	Replaced Andrzej Łoś on 23 November 2007.
Jarosław Kaczyński	Law and Justice		
Stanisław Kalemba	Polish People's Party		
Jarosław Kalinowski	Polish People's Party		
Ryszard Kalisz	Democratic Left Alliance		
Jan Kamiński	Polish People's Party		
Mariusz Kamiński	Law and Justice		
Tomasz Kamiński	Democratic Left Alliance		
Andrzej Kania	Civic Platform		
Lucjan Karasiewicz	Law and Justice		
Sebastian Karpiniuk	Civic Platform		
Grzegorz Karpiński	Civic Platform	5 – Toruń	
Włodzimierz Witold Karpiński	Civic Platform	6 – Lublin	
Karol Karski	Law and Justice		
Mieczysław Kasprzak	Polish People's Party		
Jarosław Katulski	Civic Platform	4 – Bydgoszcz	
Jan Kaźmierczak	Civic Platform		
Beata Kempa	Law and Justice	3 – Wrocław	
Małgorzata Kidawa-Błońska	Civic Platform		
Ewa Kierzkowska	Polish People's Party	5 – Toruń	
Wiesław Kilian	Law and Justice	3 – Wrocław	Replaced Aleksandra Natalli-Świat on 5 May 2010. Poland Comes First from 16 November 2010.
Witold Klepacz	Democratic Left Alliance		
Józef Klim	Civic Platform		
Izabela Kloc	Law and Justice		
Eugeniusz Kłopotek	Polish People's Party	4 – Bydgoszcz	
Sławomir Kłosowski	Law and Justice		
Joanna Kluzik-Rostkowska	Law and Justice		
Magdalena Kochan	Civic Platform		
Witold Kochan	Civic Platform		
Jan Kochanowski	Democratic Left Alliance	8 – Zielona Góra	
Lech Kołakowski	Law and Justice		
Robert Kołakowski	Law and Justice		
Longin Komołowski	Law and Justice		
Bronisław Komorowski	Civic Platform		
Zbigniew Konwiński	Civic Platform		
Ewa Kopacz	Civic Platform		
Domicela Kopaczewska	Civic Platform		
Tadeusz Kopeć	Civic Platform		
Sławomir Kopyciński	Democratic Left Alliance		
Leszek Korzeniowski	Civic Platform		
Roman Kosecki	Civic Platform		
Bożena Kotkowska	Social Democracy of Poland		
Paweł Kowal	Law and Justice		
Henryk Kowalczyk	Law and Justice		
Bogusław Kowalski	Law and Justice		
Jacek Kozaczyński	Civic Platform		
Zbigniew Kozak	Law and Justice		
Jerzy Kozdroń	Civic Platform		
Agnieszka Kozłowska-Rajewicz	Civic Platform		
Mirosław Koźlakiewicz	Civic Platform		
Maks Kraczkowski	Law and Justice		
Janusz Krasoń	Democratic Left Alliance	3 – Wrocław	
Leonard Krasulski	Law and Justice		
Robert Kropiwnicki	Civic Platform	1 – Legnica	Replaced Janusz Mikulicz on 16 December 2010.
Elżbieta Kruk	Law and Justice	6 – Lublin	
Adam Krupa	Civic Platform		
Jacek Krupa	Civic Platform		
Marek Krząkała	Civic Platform		
Adam Krzyśków	Polish People's Party		
Piotr Krzywicki	Law and Justice		
Marek Kuchciński	Law and Justice		
Włodzimierz Kula	Civic Platform		
Jan Kulas	Civic Platform		
Tomasz Kulesza	Civic Platform		
Jan Kuriata	Civic Platform		
Jacek Kurski	Law and Justice		
Kazimierz Kutz	Civic Platform		
Marek Kwitek	Law and Justice		
Stanisław Lamczyk	Civic Platform		
Marek Łatas	Law and Justice		
Tomasz Latos	Law and Justice	4 – Bydgoszcz	
Tomasz Lenz	Civic Platform	5 – Toruń	
Izabela Leszczyna	Civic Platform		
Krzysztof Lipiec	Law and Justice		
Adam Lipiński	Law and Justice	1 – Legnica	
Dariusz Lipiński	Civic Platform		
Bogdan Lis	Democratic Party – demokraci.pl		
Krzysztof Lisek	Civic Platform		
Arkadiusz Litwiński	Civic Platform		
Jan Łopata	Polish People's Party	6 – Lublin	
Andrzej Łoś	Civic Platform	3 – Wrocław	Resigned 10 November 2007.
Mieczysław Łuczak	Polish People's Party		
Elżbieta Łukacijewska	Civic Platform		
Marzena Machałek	Law and Justice	1 – Legnica	
Krzysztof Maciejewski	Law and Justice		
Antoni Macierewicz	Law and Justice		
Beata Małecka-Libera	Civic Platform		
Krystyna Łybacka	Democratic Left Alliance		
Ewa Malik	Law and Justice		
Mirosław Maliszewski	Polish People's Party		
Michał Marcinkiewicz	Civic Platform		
Barbara Marianowska	Law and Justice		
Wacław Martyniuk	Democratic Left Alliance		
Gabriela Masłowska	Law and Justice	6 – Lublin	
Mirosława Masłowska	Law and Justice		
Jerzy Materna	Law and Justice	8 – Zielona Góra	
Katarzyna Matusik-Lipiec	Civic Platform		
Zbigniew Matuszczak	Democratic Left Alliance	7 – Chełm	
Marek Matuszewski	Law and Justice		
Kazimierz Matuszny	Law and Justice		
Jarosław Matwiejuk	Democratic Left Alliance		
Krzysztof Matyjaszczyk	Democratic Left Alliance		
Beata Mazurek	Law and Justice	7 – Chełm	
Antoni Mężydło	Civic Platform	5 – Toruń	
Krzysztof Michałkiewicz	Law and Justice	6 – Lublin	
Janusz Mikulicz	Civic Platform	1 – Legnica	Resigned on 30 November 2010.
Henryk Milcarz	Democratic Left Alliance		
Konstanty Miodowicz	Civic Platform		
Henryk Młynarczyk	Law and Justice	7 – Chełm	Replaced Wojciech Żukowski on 14 December 2010.
Aldona Młyńczak	Civic Platform	3 – Wrocław	
Wojciech Mojzesowicz	Law and Justice	4 – Bydgoszcz	
Kazimierz Moskal	Law and Justice		
Tadeusz Motowidło	Democratic Left Alliance		
Czesław Mroczek	Civic Platform		
Izabela Katarzyna Mrzygłocka	Civic Platform	2 – Wałbrzych	
Joanna Mucha	Civic Platform	6 – Lublin	
Arkadiusz Mularczyk	Law and Justice		
Jan Musiał	Civic Platform		
Tadeusz Naguszewski	Civic Platform		
Witold Namyślak	Civic Platform		
Grzegorz Napieralski	Democratic Left Alliance		
Aleksandra Natalli-Świat	Law and Justice	3 – Wrocław	Died 10 April 2010.
Sławomir Neumann	Civic Platform		
Stefan Niesiołowski	Civic Platform	8 – Zielona Góra	
Sławomir Nitras	Civic Platform		
Maria Nowak	Law and Justice		
Sławomir Nowak	Civic Platform		
Tomasz Piotr Nowak	Civic Platform		
Andrzej Nowakowski	Civic Platform		
Mirosława Nykiel	Civic Platform		
Marzena Okła-Drewnowicz	Civic Platform		
Stanisław Olas	Polish People's Party		
Jan Ołdakowski	Law and Justice		
Alicja Olechowska	Civic Platform		
Danuta Olejniczak	Civic Platform		
Wojciech Olejniczak	Democratic Left Alliance		
Paweł Olszewski	Civic Platform	4 – Bydgoszcz	
Marek Opioła	Law and Justice		
Andrzej Orzechowski	Civic Platform		
Maciej Orzechowski	Civic Platform		
Jacek Osuch	Law and Justice		
Artur Ostrowski	Democratic Left Alliance		
Konstanty Oświęcimski	Civic Platform		
Stanisław Ożóg	Law and Justice		
Zbigniew Pacelt	Civic Platform		
Witold Pahl	Civic Platform	8 – Zielona Góra	
Janusz Palikot	Civic Platform	6 – Lublin	Resigned on 10 January 2011.
Anna Paluch	Law and Justice		
Andrzej Pałys	Polish People's Party		
Mirosław Pawlak	Polish People's Party		
Waldemar Pawlak	Polish People's Party		
Bolesław Piecha	Law and Justice		
Janusz Piechociński	Polish People's Party		
Sławomir Jan Piechota	Civic Platform	3 – Wrocław	
Elżbieta Pierzchała	Civic Platform		
Danuta Pietraszewska	Civic Platform		
Jarosław Pięta	Civic Platform		
Stanisław Pięta	Law and Justice		
Jacek Pilch	Law and Justice		
Teresa Piotrowska	Civic Platform	4 – Bydgoszcz	
Grzegorz Pisalski	Social Democracy of Poland		
Julia Pitera	Civic Platform		
Maciej Płażyński	Law and Justice		
Kazimierz Plocke	Civic Platform		
Marek Plura	Civic Platform		
Jerzy Polaczek	Law and Justice		
Marek Polak	Law and Justice		
Piotr Polak	Law and Justice		
Wojciech Pomajda	Democratic Left Alliance		
Paweł Poncyljusz	Law and Justice		
Krzysztof Popiołek	Law and Justice		
Sławomir Preiss	Civic Platform		
Stanisława Prządka	Democratic Left Alliance		
Krzysztof Putra	Law and Justice		
Norbert Raba	Civic Platform	3 – Wrocław	
Józef Racki	Polish People's Party		
Damian Raczkowski	Civic Platform		
Elżbieta Radziszewska	Civic Platform		
Elżbieta Rafalska	Law and Justice	8 – Zielona Góra	
Stanisław Rakoczy	Polish People's Party		
Grzegorz Raniewicz	Civic Platform	7 – Chełm	
Ireneusz Raś	Civic Platform		
Jan Religa	Law and Justice		
Zbigniew Religa	Law and Justice		
Jerzy Rębek	Law and Justice	7 – Chełm	
Adam Rogacki	Law and Justice		
Józef Rojek	Law and Justice		
Nelly Rokita	Law and Justice		
Tadeusz Ross	Civic Platform		
Grzegorz Roszak	Civic Platform	4 – Bydgoszcz	
Halina Rozpondek	Civic Platform		
Jarosław Rusiecki	Law and Justice		
Jakub Rutnicki	Civic Platform		
Arkadiusz Rybicki	Civic Platform		
Sławomir Rybicki	Civic Platform		
Stanisław Rydzoń	Democratic Left Alliance		
Zbigniew Rynasiewicz	Civic Platform		
Andrzej Ryszka	Civic Platform		
Jan Rzymełka	Civic Platform		
Małgorzata Sadurska	Law and Justice	6 – Lublin	
Wojciech Saługa	Civic Platform		
Marek Sawicki	Polish People's Party		
Grzegorz Schetyna	Civic Platform	1 – Legnica	
Mirosław Sekuła	Civic Platform		
Dariusz Seliga	Law and Justice		
Jarosław Sellin	Law and Justice		
Joanna Senyszyn	Democratic Left Alliance		
Edward Siarka	Law and Justice		
Henryk Siedlaczek	Civic Platform		
Izabella Sierakowska	Social Democracy of Poland	6 – Lublin	
Anna Sikora	Law and Justice		
Radosław Sikorski	Civic Platform	4 – Bydgoszcz	
Witold Sitarz	Civic Platform		
Aleksander Skorupa	Civic Platform	3 – Wrocław	Resigned 28 December 2010.
Krystyna Skowrońska	Civic Platform		
Joanna Skrzydlewska	Civic Platform		
Bożena Sławiak	Civic Platform	8 – Zielona Góra	
Tadeusz Sławecki	Polish People's Party	7 – Chełm	
Iwona Śledzińska-Katarasińska	Civic Platform		
Andrzej Smirnow	Civic Platform		
Tomasz Smolarz	Civic Platform	2 – Wałbrzych	
Anna Sobecka	Law and Justice	5 – Toruń	
Wojciech Sokołowski	Civic Platform	1 – Legnica	Entered Sejm on 16 December 2010
Krzysztof Sońta	Law and Justice		
Andrzej Sośnierz	Law and Justice		
Lech Sprawka	Law and Justice	6 – Lublin	
Piotr Stanke	Law and Justice		
Lidia Staroń	Civic Platform		
Marian Starownik	Polish People's Party	6 – Lublin	Replaced Edward Wojtas on 20 May 2010.
Jarosław Stawiarski	Law and Justice	6 – Lublin	
Stanisław Stec	Democratic Left Alliance		
Franciszek Stefaniuk	Polish People's Party	7 – Chełm	
Elżbieta Streker-Dembińska	Democratic Left Alliance		
Adam Struzik	Polish People's Party		
Michał Stuligrosz	Civic Platform		
Marek Suski	Law and Justice		
Paweł Suski	Civic Platform		
Miron Sycz	Civic Platform		
Wojciech Szarama	Law and Justice		
Wiesław Szczepański	Democratic Left Alliance		
Michał Szczerba	Civic Platform		
Aleksander Szczygło	Law and Justice		
Jolanta Szczypińska	Law and Justice		
Adam Szejnfeld	Civic Platform		
Andrzej Szlachta	Law and Justice		
Jerzy Szmajdziński	Democratic Left Alliance	1 – Legnica	Died on 10 April 2010.
Grzegorz Sztolcman	Civic Platform		
Jakub Szulc	Civic Platform	2 – Wałbrzych	
Stanisław Szwed	Law and Justice		
Beata Szydło	Law and Justice		
Bożena Szydłowska	Civic Platform		
Jolanta Szymanek-Deresz	Democratic Left Alliance		
Jan Szyszko	Law and Justice		
Krzysztof Tchórzewski	Law and Justice		
Robert Telus	Law and Justice		
Ryszard Terlecki	Law and Justice		
Grzegorz Tobiszowski	Law and Justice		
Jan Tomaka	Civic Platform		
Piotr Tomański	Civic Platform		
Irena Tomaszak-Zesiuk	Civic Platform		
Tadeusz Tomaszewski	Democratic Left Alliance		
Jacek Tomczak	Law and Justice		
Cezary Tomczyk	Civic Platform		
Tomasz Tomczykiewicz	Civic Platform		
Donald Tusk	Civic Platform		
Łukasz Tusk	Civic Platform		
Krzysztof Tyszkiewicz	Civic Platform		
Robert Tyszkiewicz	Civic Platform		
Kazimierz Michał Ujazdowski	Law and Justice	3 – Wrocław	
Cezary Urban	Civic Platform		
Jarosław Urbaniak	Civic Platform		
Piotr van der Coghen	Civic Platform		
Jarosław Wałęsa	Civic Platform		
Andrzej Walkowiak	Law and Justice		
Teresa Wargocka	Law and Justice		
Piotr Waśko	Civic Platform		
Zbigniew Wassermann	Law and Justice		
Robert Węgrzyn	Civic Platform		
Jerzy Wenderlich	Democratic Left Alliance	5 – Toruń	
Waldemar Wiązowski	Law and Justice	2 – Wałbrzych	
Jan Widacki	Democratic Party – demokraci.pl		
Monika Wielichowska	Civic Platform	2 – Wałbrzych	
Marek Wikiński	Democratic Left Alliance		
Wojciech Wilk	Civic Platform	6 – Lublin	
Jadwiga Wiśniewska	Law and Justice		
Stanisław Witaszczyk	Polish People's Party		
Elżbieta Witek	Law and Justice	1 – Legnica	
Radosław Witkowski	Civic Platform		
Wiesław Woda	Polish People's Party		
Jarosław Wojciechowski	Civic Platform	3 – Wrocław	Replaced Aleksander Skorupa on 19 January 2011.
Zbigniew Wojciechowski	Civic Platform	6 – Lublin	Replaced Janusz Palikot on 1 February 2011. Poland Comes First from 1 February 2011.
Marek Wójcik	Civic Platform		
Norbert Wojnarowski	Civic Platform	1 – Legnica	
Edward Wojtas	Polish People's Party	6 – Lublin	Died on 10 April 2010.
Michał Wojtkiewicz	Law and Justice		
Marek Wojtkowski	Civic Platform	5 – Toruń	
Ewa Wolak	Civic Platform	3 – Wrocław	
Bogusław Wontor	Democratic Left Alliance	8 – Zielona Góra	
Tadeusz Woźniak	Law and Justice		
Waldemar Wrona	Law and Justice		
Marzena Wróbel	Law and Justice		
Adam Wykręt	Civic Platform		
Stanisław Wziątek	Democratic Left Alliance		
Jacek Zacharewicz	Civic Platform		
Jarosław Żaczek	Law and Justice	6 – Lublin	
Stanisław Zając	Law and Justice		
Jadwiga Zakrzewska	Civic Platform	1 – Legnica	Replaced Jerzy Szmajdziński on 7 May 2010.
Jacek Żalek	Civic Platform		
Anna Zalewska	Law and Justice	2 – Wałbrzych	
Paweł Zalewski	Law and Justice		
Renata Zaremba	Civic Platform		
Ryszard Zawadzki	Civic Platform		
Marcin Zawiła	Civic Platform	1 – Legnica	
Sławomir Zawiślak	Law and Justice	7 – Chełm	
Łukasz Zbonikowski	Law and Justice	5 – Toruń	
Ryszard Zbrzyzny	Democratic Left Alliance	1 – Legnica	
Hanna Zdanowska	Civic Platform		Resigned in 2010.
Bogdan Zdrojewski	Civic Platform	3 – Wrocław	
Stanisław Żelichowski	Polish People's Party		
Janusz Zemke	Democratic Left Alliance	4 – Bydgoszcz	Resigned on 10 June 2009.
Anna Zielińska-Głębocka	Civic Platform		
Jarosław Zieliński	Law and Justice		
Marek Zieliński	Civic Platform		
Wojciech Ziemniak	Civic Platform		
Zbigniew Ziobro	Law and Justice		
Jerzy Ziętek	Civic Platform		
Stanisław Żmijan	Civic Platform	7 – Chełm	
Maria Zuba	Law and Justice		
Wojciech Żukowski	Law and Justice	7 – Chełm	Resigned on 7 December 2010.
Józef Zych	Polish People's Party	8 – Zielona Góra	
Adam Żyliński	Civic Platform		

== See also ==
- 2007 Polish parliamentary election
- List of Polish senators (2007–2011)
- List of Sejm members (2005–2007) – former term
