= Tuczapy, Hrubieszów County =

Tuczapy
- Village
- Location within Poland
- Coordinates: 50°36′07″N 23°46′48″E
- Country: Poland
- Voivodeship: Lublin
- County: Hrubieszów
- Gmina: Mircze

Tuczapy [tuˈt͡ʂapɨ] is a village in the administrative district of Gmina Mircze, within Hrubieszów County, Lublin Voivodeship, in eastern Poland, close to the border with Ukraine.
