= Wałbrzych Voivodeship =

Former administrative division in Silesia

Coordinates: 50°46′07″N 16°16′51″E

Walbrzych Voivodeship Województwo wałbrzyskie
- Voivodeship of Poland
- 1975–1998
- Location of the voivodeship within Poland, 1975
- Capital: Wałbrzych
- Demonym: Silesians
- Government
  - Type: Republic
- Voivode
  - 1990-93: Jerzy Świteńki
  - 1993-97: Henryk Gołębiewski
- Historical era: 20th century
  - Established: 1975
  - Disestablished: 1998
- Subdivisions
  - Type: Gminas
Preceded by	Succeeded by
Wrocław Voivodeship	Lower Silesian Voivodeship
- Today part of: Third Polish Republic

Walbrzych Voivodeship (Polish: województwo wałbrzyskie) was a unit of administrative division and local government in Poland from the years 1975 to 1998, eventually superseded by the Lower Silesian Voivodeship.

== Major cities and towns (population in 1995) ==
- Wałbrzych (139,600)
- Świdnica (64,800)
- Dzierżoniów (38,300)
- Bielawa (34,600)
- Kłodzko (30,900)
- Nowa Ruda (27,200)
- Świebodzice (24,700)

== See also ==
- Voivodeships of Poland
