= Mołożów-Kolonia =

- Village
- Location within Poland
- Coordinates: 50°36′33″N 23°48′49″E
- Country: Poland
- Voivodeship: Lublin
- County: Hrubieszów
- Gmina: Mircze

Mołożów-Kolonia [mɔˈwɔʐuf kɔˈlɔɲa] is a village in the administrative district of Gmina Mircze, within Hrubieszów County, Lublin Voivodeship, in eastern Poland, close to the border with Ukraine.
