= Małków-Kolonia =

- Village
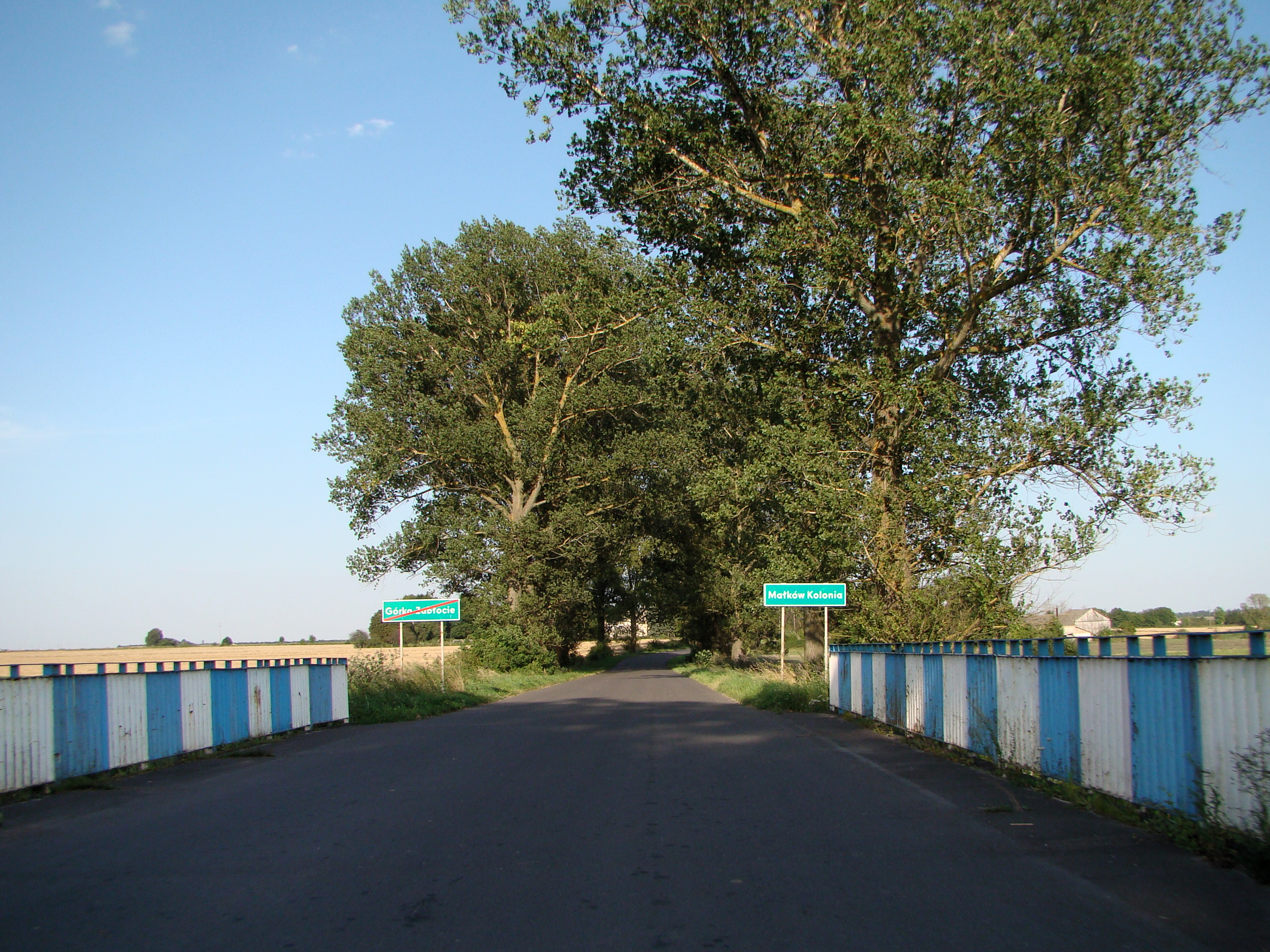
- Entrance to Małków-Kolonia

- Location within Poland
- Coordinates: 50°39′50″N 24°00′05″E
- Country: Poland
- Voivodeship: Lublin
- County: Hrubieszów
- Gmina: Mircze
- Population: 210

Małków-Kolonia [ˈmau̯kuf kɔˈlɔɲa] is a village in the administrative district of Gmina Mircze, within Hrubieszów County, Lublin Voivodeship, in eastern Poland, close to the border with Ukraine.
