= Jerzy Świteńki =

Polish lawyer and politician

Voivode of Wałbrzych Voivodeship
- In office 1990–1993
- Preceded by: Władysław Piotrowski
- Succeeded by: Henryk Gołębiewski

Personal details
- Born: 8 February 1960 (age 66) Stare Bogaczowice, Poland
- Party: Freedom Union
- Education: Uniwersytet Wrocławski

Jerzy Świteńki (born 8 February 1960 in Stare Bogaczowice) is a Polish lawyer and politician, in 1990–1993 serving as the voivode of Wałbrzych Voivodeship.

== Biography ==
He graduated the University of Wrocław in 1983. He worked as a judge of the Sąd rejonowy in Wałbrzych. In 1994, he started a private law firm, working as a lawyer.

In 1990–1993, he served as the Voivode of Wałbrzych. In 1998, he became a general director of the Ministry of Justice, serving until 2000. Afterwards, he returned to working as a lawyer in Wałbrzych.

In 1994–2005, he belonged to the Freedom Union, being the regional chairman of the party.

He was awarded the Cross of Merit in 1998, and is an honorary member of Rotary Club Świdnica-Wałbrzych.
