= Kryłów-Kolonia =

- Village
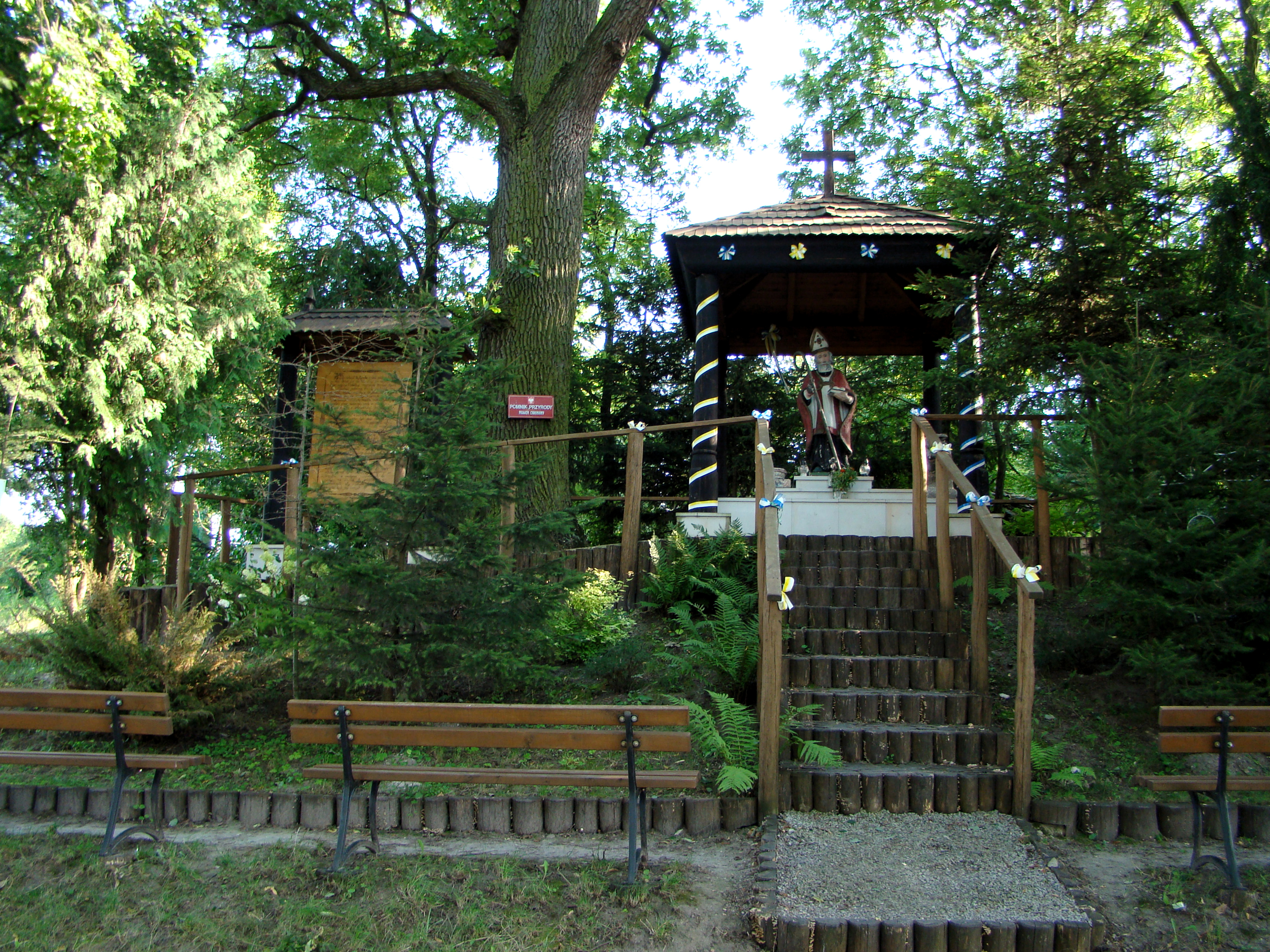
- Shrine in Kryłów-Kolonia

- Location within Poland
- Coordinates: 50°40′16″N 24°02′14″E
- Country: Poland
- Voivodeship: Lublin
- County: Hrubieszów
- Gmina: Mircze
- Population: 250
- Website: http://www.krylow.info

Kryłów-Kolonia [ˈkrɨwuf kɔˈlɔɲa] is a village in the administrative district of Gmina Mircze, within Hrubieszów County, Lublin Voivodeship, in eastern Poland, close to the border with Ukraine.
