= Sejm Constituency no. 8 =

Parliamentary constituency in Poland

Zielona Góra
- Polish: Okręg wyborczy Zielona Góra
- Constituency for the National Assembly of the Republic of Poland
- Boundary of the Zielona Góra Constituency in Poland for the 2011 general election.
- Counties in Lubusz Voivodeship: Gorzów, Krosno, Międzyrzecz, Nowa Sól, Słubice, Strzelce-Drezdenko, Sulęcin, Świebodzin, Wschowa, Żagań, Żary, and Zielona Góra
- City Counties in Lubusz Voivodeship: Gorzów Wielkopolski and Zielona Góra

Current constituency
- Sejm Deputies: 12
- Sejm District: 8
- European Parliament constituency: Lubusz and West Pomeranian
- Voivodeship sejmik: Lubusz Regional Assembly

Zielona Góra is a Polish parliamentary constituency that is coterminous with the Lubusz Voivodeship. It elects twelve members of the Sejm.

The district has the number '8' and is named after the city of Zielona Góra. It includes the counties of Gorzów, Krosno, Międzyrzecz, Nowa Sól, Słubice, Strzelce-Drezdenko, Sulęcin, Świebodzin, Wschowa, Żagań, Żary, and Zielona Góra and the city counties of Gorzów Wielkopolski and Zielona Góra.

== List of members ==
=== 2019-2023 ===
Member	Party
Tomasz Aniśko	The Greens
Marek Ast	Law and Justice
Jolanta Fedak	Polish People's Party
Krystian Kamiński	Confederation
Anita Kucharska-Dziedzic	Democratic Left Alliance
Jacek Kurzępa	Law and Justice
Jerzy Materna	Law and Justice
Katarzyna Osos	Civic Platform
Elżbieta Płonka	Law and Justice
Krystyna Sibińska	Civic Platform
Waldemar Sługocki	Civic Platform
Bogusław Wontor	Democratic Left Alliance
