= Miętkie-Kolonia =

- Village
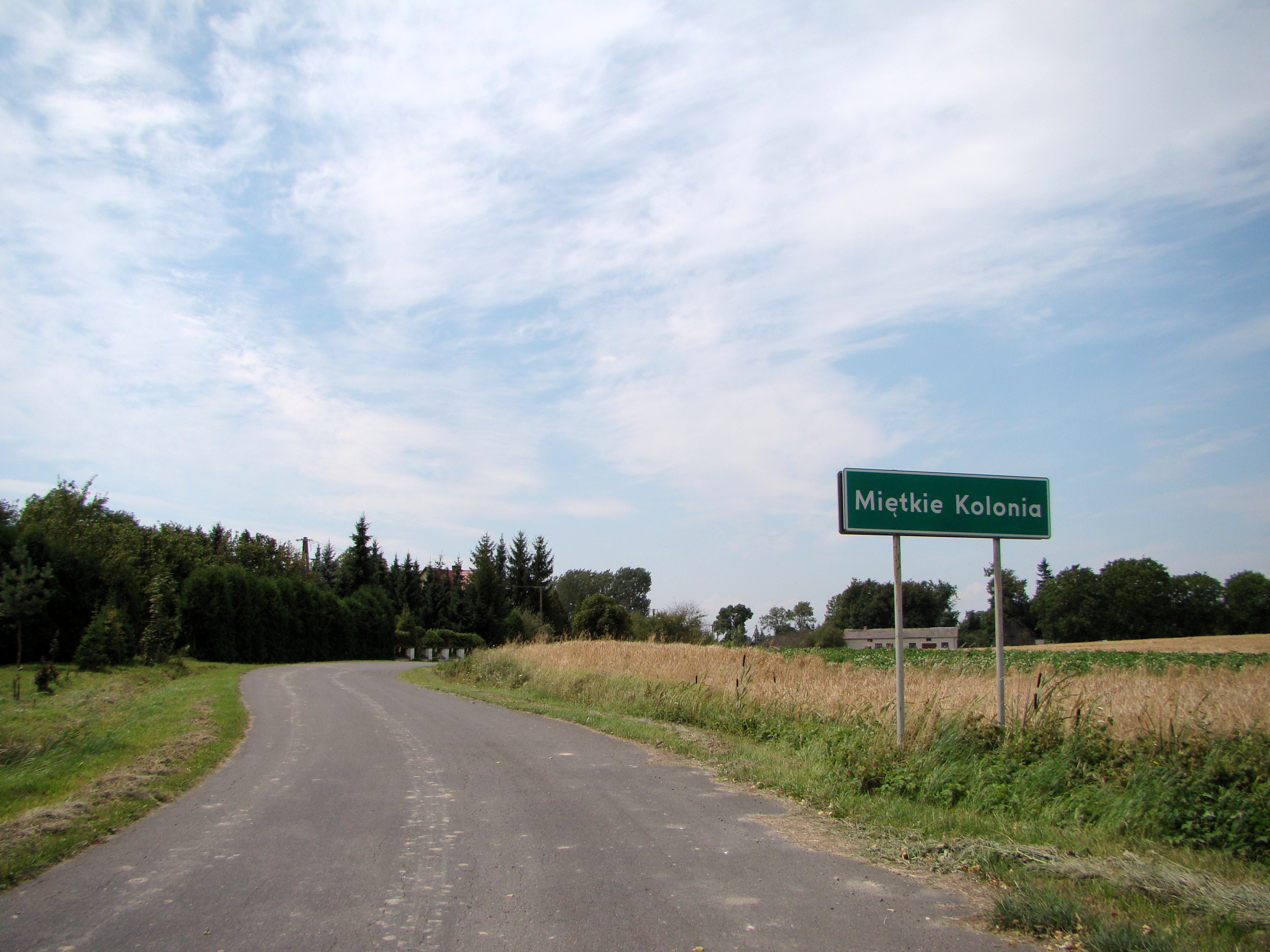
- Road sign in Miętkie-Kolonia

- Location within Poland
- Coordinates: 50°39′34″N 23°49′03″E
- Country: Poland
- Voivodeship: Lublin
- County: Hrubieszów
- Gmina: Mircze

Miętkie-Kolonia [ˈmjɛntkʲɛ kɔˈlɔɲa] is a village in the administrative district of Gmina Mircze, within Hrubieszów County, Lublin Voivodeship, in eastern Poland, close to the border with Ukraine.
