= Henryk Gołębiewski =

Henryk Gołębiewski may refer to:

- Henryk Gołębiewski (politician) (born 1942), Polish politician
- Henryk Gołębiewski (actor) (born 1956), Polish actor
