= Bogusław Kowalski =

Polish politician (born 1964)

Deputy of the Sejm
- In office 2005 – 2011
- Constituency: 18 – Siedlce

Personal details
- Born: October 23, 1964 (age 61) Mircze, Polish People's Republic
- Party: Law and Justice
- Other political affiliations: League of Polish Families (2005–6); National People's Movement (2006–7)

Bogusław Kowalski (born 23 October 1964 in Mircze) is a Polish politician.

He was elected to Sejm on 25 September 2005 getting 6274 votes in Siedlce constituency, running for the League of Polish Families.

== See also ==
- Members of Polish Sejm 2005-2007
- Members of Polish Sejm 2007-2011
