= Aleksandra Natalli-Świat =

Polish politician (1959–2010)

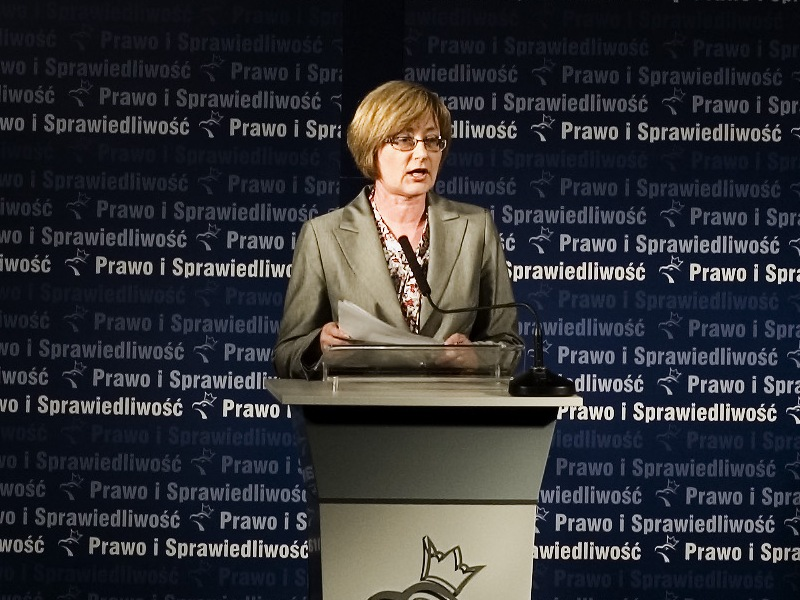

Deputy of the Sejm
- In office 25 September 2005 – 10 April 2010
- Succeeded by: Wiesław Kilian
- Constituency: 3 Wrocław

Personal details
- Born: 20 February 1959 Oborniki Śląskie, Polish People's Republic
- Died: 10 April 2010 (aged 51) near Smolensk, Russia
- Party: Law and Justice

Aleksandra Krystyna Natalli-Świat (20 February 1959 – 10 April 2010) was a Polish economist and politician. She was elected to Sejm on 25 September 2005, getting 5068 votes in 3 Wrocław district, from the Law and Justice candidate list. In 2007, she was re-elected to the Sejm.

Natalli-Świat died in the 2010 Polish Air Force Tu-154 crash near Smolensk on 10 April 2010.

On 16 April 2010 she was posthumously awarded the Commander's Cross of the Order of Polonia Restituta. On the same day, the Parliament of the Province of Lower Silesia awarded her the title of Honorary Citizen of Lower Silesia. She was buried on 26 April 2010 at the Cemetery of the Holy Spirit in Wroclaw.

== See also ==
- Members of Polish Sejm 2005–2007
- Members of Polish Sejm 2007–2011
