= Anita Błochowiak =

Polish politician (born 1973)

Member of Sejm 2001-2005
- In office 19 October 2001 – 18 October 2005
- Prime Minister: Leszek Miller Marek Belka

Member of Sejm 2005-2007
- In office 19 October 2005 – 4 November 2007
- Prime Minister: Kazimierz Marcinkiewicz Jarosław Kaczyński

Member of Sejm 2007-2011
- In office 5 November 2007 – 7 November 2011
- Prime Minister: Donald Tusk

Personal details
- Born: 1973 (age 52–53) Pabianice
- Party: Democratic Left Alliance
- Parent: Jerzy Błochowiak

Anita Błochowiak [aˈɲita bwɔˈxɔvʲak] (born 7 November 1973) is a Polish politician served in the country's national parliament, the Sejm, from 2001 to 2011, before stepping away from politics, citing difficulties with tabloid rumours. She was well known for sitting on the committee that investigated the Rywin affair.

A native of the town of Pabianice, the seat of Pabianice County, within the metropolitan area of Łódź, the nation's third-largest city, Błochowiak was elected, on 23 September 2001, as a member of the Democratic Left Alliance, to represent Sieradz district 11 in the Sejm. She was re-elected from the same district on 25 September 2005, receiving 3451 votes, and again retained her seat two years later, in the 21 October 2007 Polish parliamentary election.

== See also ==
- Members of Polish Sejm 2001-2005
- List of Sejm members (2005–2007)
