= Paweł Olszewski (politician) =

Polish economist and politician

Paweł Bartosz Olszewski
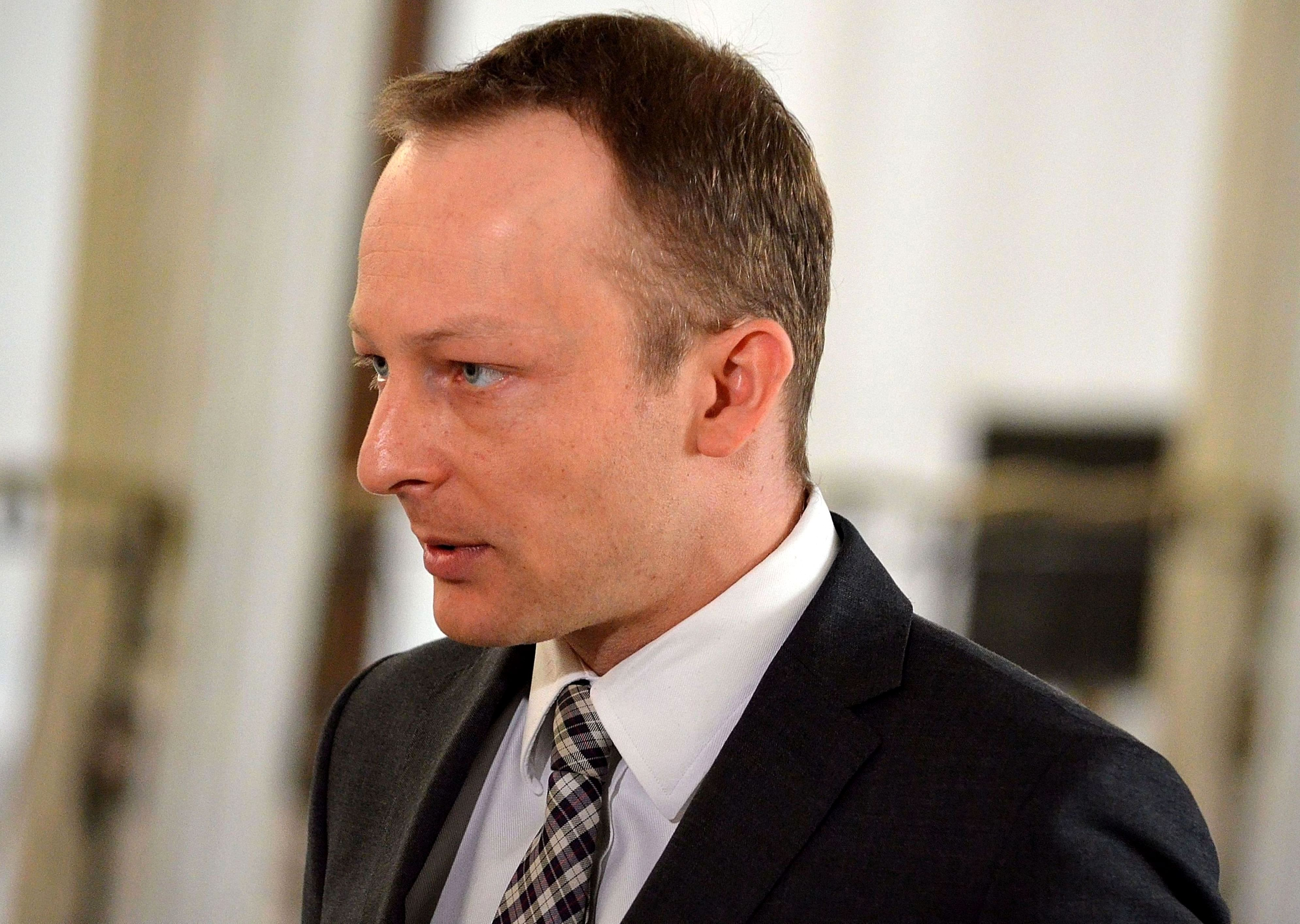

Member of the Sejm
- Incumbent
- Assumed office 19 October 2005
- Constituency: 4 – Bydgoszcz

Deputy Ministry of Digital Affairs
- Incumbent
- Assumed office 13 December 2023

Personal details
- Born: 11 December 1979 (age 46) Bydgoszcz, Polish People's Republic
- Party: Civic Platform

Paweł Bartosz Olszewski (born 11 December 1979 in Bydgoszcz, Polish People's Republic) is a Polish economist and politician, Bydgoszcz City Councillor (2002–05) and member of the Sejm (since 2005).

== Early life and career ==
He graduated from Florian Kaja Elementary School No. 32 in Bydgoszcz and Cyprian Norwid Secondary School No. 1 in Bydgoszcz. Afterward, he studied management and marketing (economy policy specialization) in the Faculty of Law and Administration at the Adam Mickiewicz University in Poznań. After his studies, he worked as an export manager at Bydgoska Fabryka Mebli (Furniture Factory in Bydgoszcz). After 2004, he worked as a procurator at Zakłady Mechaniczne Skraw-Mech Sp. z o.o. (LLC). After being elected to the Sejm in 2005, he resigned from this work.

== Political career ==
=== City Council ===
On 27 October 2002 he was elected to the Bydgoszcz City Council (Rada Miasta Bydgoszcz). He received 382 votes in the 3rd district as a candidate from the Bydgoszcz Civic Agreement list (Bydgoskie Porozumienie Obywatelskie). At 23 years old, he was the youngest member of the Bydgoszcz City Council. BPO's presidential candidate, Konstanty Dombrowicz was elected President. In the city council, Olszewski served as the vice-chairperson of the Budget and Finance Committee and as a member of the European Integration Committee. His term ended in 2005 when he was elected to the Sejm.

=== Fifth Term Sejm ===
On 25 September 2005 he was elected to the Sejm of the Republic of Poland, the lower house of the Polish parliament. He polled 6,850 votes in 4 Bydgoszcz district as a candidate from the Civic Platform list. From 9 November he served as a member of the Economy Committee and the Administration and Internal Affairs Committee. He was a member of the Sejm V Term from 19 October 2005 to 5 November 2007, when his term ended.

=== Sixth Term Sejm ===
On 21 October 2007 he was re-elected to the Sejm. He polled 8,633 votes in 4 Bydgoszcz district as a candidate from the Civic Platform list. He has been a member of Sejm VI Term since 6 November 2007. He has actively worked against the Zawisza Bydgoszcz football club and its fans.

== Personal life ==
His father Wiesław was also a politician. Wiesław Olszewski was a member of the Democratic Left Alliance and served as the governor of Bydgoszcz Voivodeship from 1993 to 1997, and as a Bydgoszcz City councillor until 2006.

== See also ==
- List of Sejm members (2005–07)
- List of Sejm members (2007–11)
- List of Sejm members (2011–15)
- List of Sejm members (2015–19)
- List of Sejm members (2019–23)
