= Krystian Kamiński =

Polish politician (born 1983)

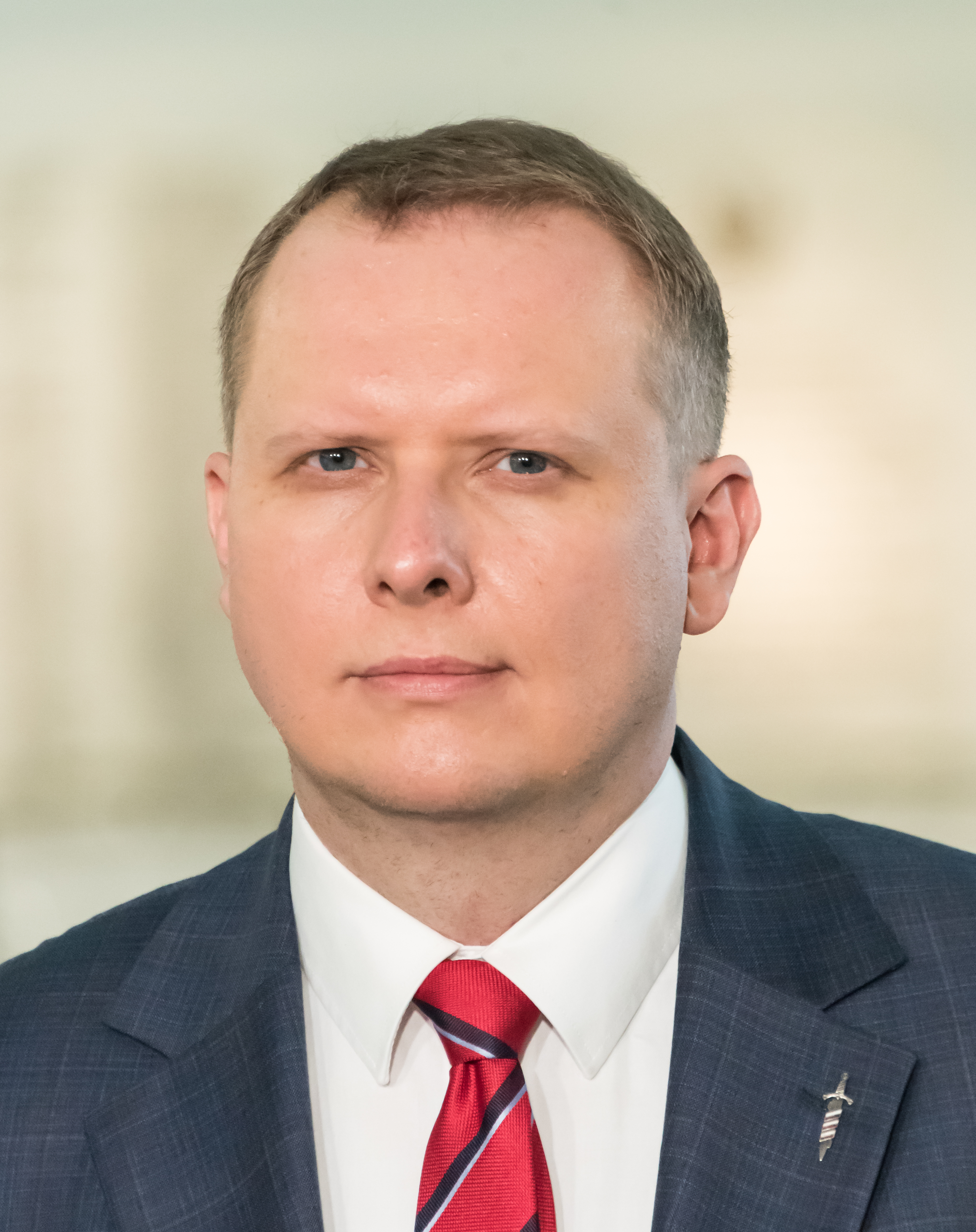
- Kamiński in 2022

Member of the Sejm
- In office 12 November 2019 – 12 November 2023
- Constituency: Zielona Góra

Personal details
- Born: 9 February 1983 (age 43)
- Party: National Movement
- Other political affiliations: Confederation Liberty and Independence

Krystian Kamiński (born 9 February 1983) is a Polish politician. From 2019 to 2023, he was a member of the Sejm. In the 2024 European Parliament election in Poland, he was the lead candidate of the Confederation Liberty and Independence in Warsaw.
