= Sławomir Nowak =

Polish politician and state official in Ukraine

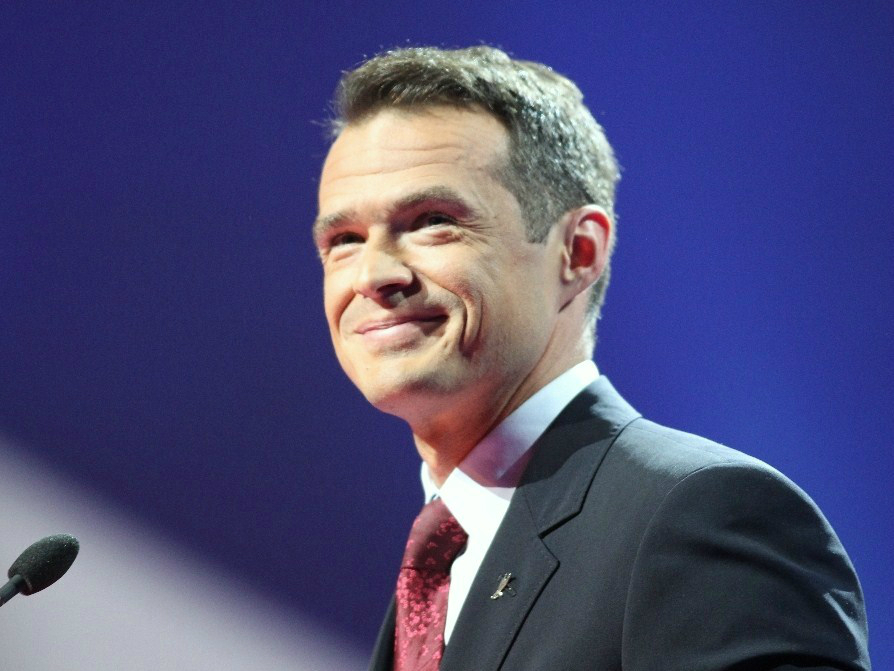

Minister of Transport, Construction and Marine Economy of Poland
- In office 18 November 2011 – 27 November 2013
- President: Bronisław Komorowski
- Prime Minister: Donald Tusk
- Preceded by: Cezary Grabarczyk
- Succeeded by: Zbigniew Rynasiewicz

Member of the Sejm
- In office 8 November 2011 – 2 January 2015
- In office 20 June 2004 – 20 October 2010
- Constituency: Gdańsk

Acting Head of the State Road Agency of Ukraine
- In office 19 October 2016 – 1 October 2019
- Prime Minister: Volodymyr Groysman, Oleksiy Honcharuk

Personal details
- Born: 11 December 1974 (age 51) Gdańsk, Poland
- Party: Liberal Democratic Congress (1993-1994); Freedom Union (1994-2001); Civic Platform (2001–)
- Spouse: Monika Nowak
- Children: Julian, Natalia
- Education: University of Gdańsk; Maritime Academy of Gdynia
- Profession: Political scientist

Sławomir Ryszard Nowak (born 11 December 1974 in Gdańsk) is a Polish politician and a state official in Ukraine. He was elected to the Sejm on 25 September 2005, getting 9,061 votes in 25 Gdańsk district as a candidate from the Civic Platform list.

He was also a member of Sejm 2001-2005.

Nowak served as head of the electoral staff of a candidate for President of Poland, Bronisław Komorowski, during the 2010 presidential election.

From 18 November 2011 to 27 November 2013 he served as Minister of Transport, Construction and Maritime Economy.

On 24 October 2016 he was appointed chief of Ukrainian transport agency Ukravtodor and awarded Ukrainian citizenship. He was dismissed from the post of Ukravtodor's head in September 2019.

On 20 July 2020 Nowak was arrested by Poland's Central Anticorruption Bureau (after a joint investigation with the National Anti-Corruption Bureau of Ukraine) on suspicion of corruption, management of an organized criminal group, and money laundering. According to the National Anti-Corruption Bureau of Ukraine Ukravtodor officials had "created a criminal organization whose activities were aimed at embezzling funds allocated by international organizations for road repairs in Ukraine."

== See also ==
- List of Sejm members (2005–2007)
- List of Sejm members (2007–11)
- List of Sejm members (2011–15)
