= Władysław Dajczak =

Polish politician (born 1964)

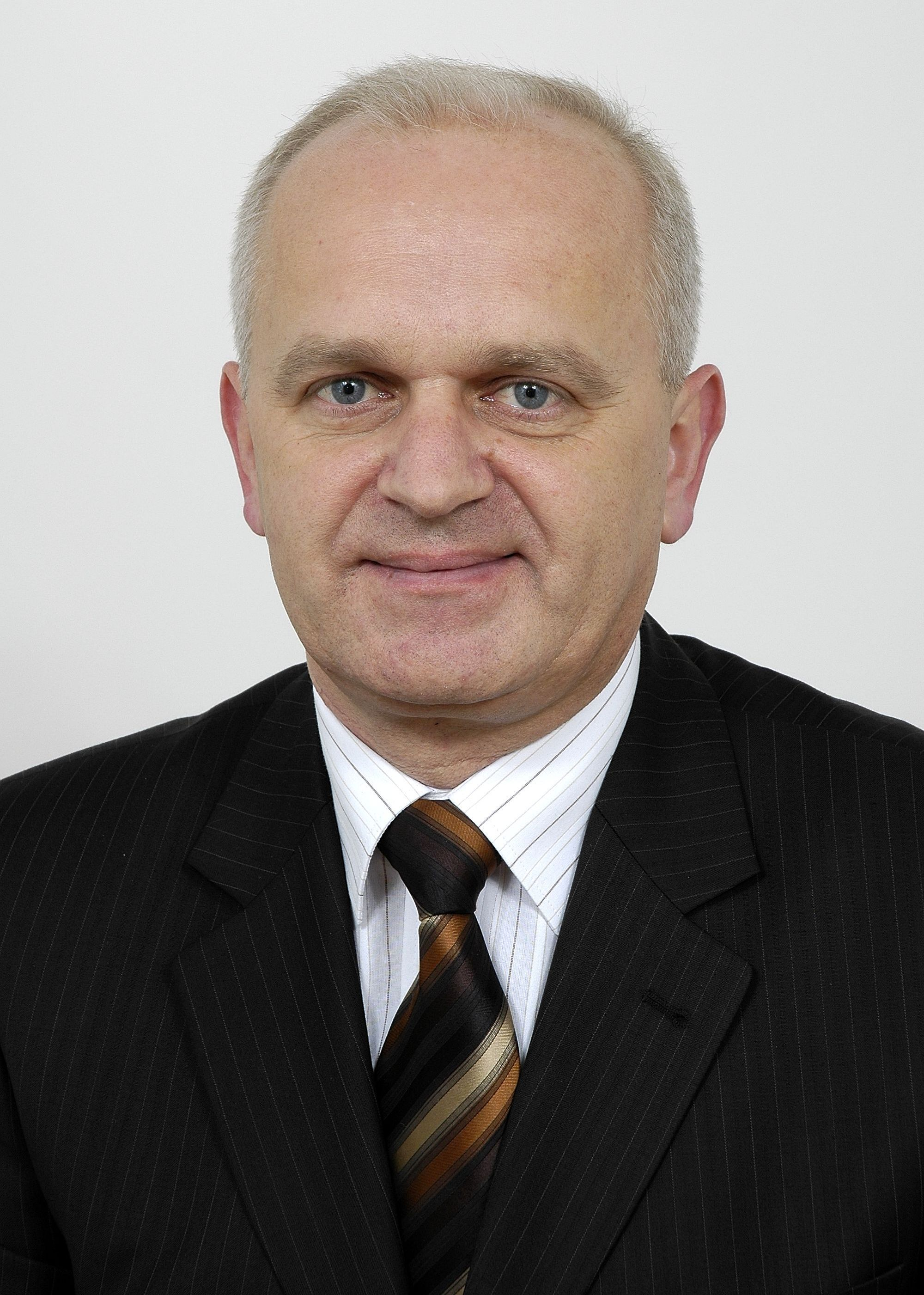

Member of the Sejm
- Incumbent
- Assumed office 2023

Voivode of Lubusz Voivodeship
- In office 8 December 2015 – 11 November 2019
- President: Andrzej Duda
- Prime Minister: Mateusz Morawiecki
- Preceded by: Katarzyna Osos
- Succeeded by: Marek Cebula
- In office 15 January 2020 – 2 November 2023

Member of the Senate
- In office 2007–2011

Personal details
- Born: 10 July 1959 (age 67) Międzyrzecz, Polish People's Republic
- Citizenship: Poland
- Party: Law and Justice
- Education: Higher School of Engineering in Zielona Góra; University of Wrocław

Władysław Dajczak (born 10 July 1959 in Międzyrzecz) is a Polish politician, engineer and local government official. Senator of the 7th term (2007–2011), Member of the Sejm of the 9th and 10th terms, and Voivode of Lubusz Voivodeship (2015–2019, 2020–2023).

== Biography ==
Son of Michał and Zofia, brother of Bishop Edward Dajczak, he was born in Międzyrzecz. In 1983, he graduated from the Faculty of Mechanical Engineering at the Higher School of Engineering in Zielona Góra, and in 1997, completed postgraduate studies at the Faculty of Law and Administration of the University of Wrocław. From 1985 to 1992, he worked at the Municipal Housing and Utilities Company in Strzelce Krajeńskie, then until 2007 as director of the Municipal Utilities Company Sp. z o.o.

He unsuccessfully ran for parliament in the Gorzów Voivodeship in 1993 on the Nonpartisan Bloc for Support of Reforms ticket and in 1997 on the AWS ticket. From 1998 to 2002, he served on the Lubusz Voivodeship Sejmik as a member of the AWS party. In the 2002 local elections, he unsuccessfully ran for re-election on the PO-PiS coalition ticket. He was re-elected as a provincial councilor in 2006 on the Law and Justice ticket, becoming deputy chairman of the assembly.

In the 2005 parliamentary elections, he ran unsuccessfully for the Sejm again. In the 2007 elections, he was elected senator on the PiS ticket in the Lubusz district, receiving 90,322 votes. In 2011, he ran unsuccessfully for the Sejm. In 2014, he returned to the Lubusz Voivodeship Sejmik. In 2015, he was again a PiS candidate for MP.

On 8 December 2015 he was appointed Voivode of Lubusz Voivodeship. In the 2019 European Parliament elections, he unsuccessfully ran for a seat in the European Parliament. In the elections of the same year, he was elected as a Member of Parliament of the 9th term from the Lubusz constituency, receiving 27,393 votes. Following this election, he resigned as Voivode on 11 November 2019.

On 10 January 2020, Prime Minister Mateusz Morawiecki reappointed him as Voivode of Lubusz Voivodeship (effective 15 January 2020). As a result, his parliamentary mandate expired. In the 2023 elections, he was elected to the Sejm for a second time, receiving 29,131 votes. Consequently, on 2 November that year, he resigned as Voivode. In 2024, he ran again on the Law and Justice list in the European Parliament elections from district no. 13.
