= Andrzej Czerwiński =

Polish politician

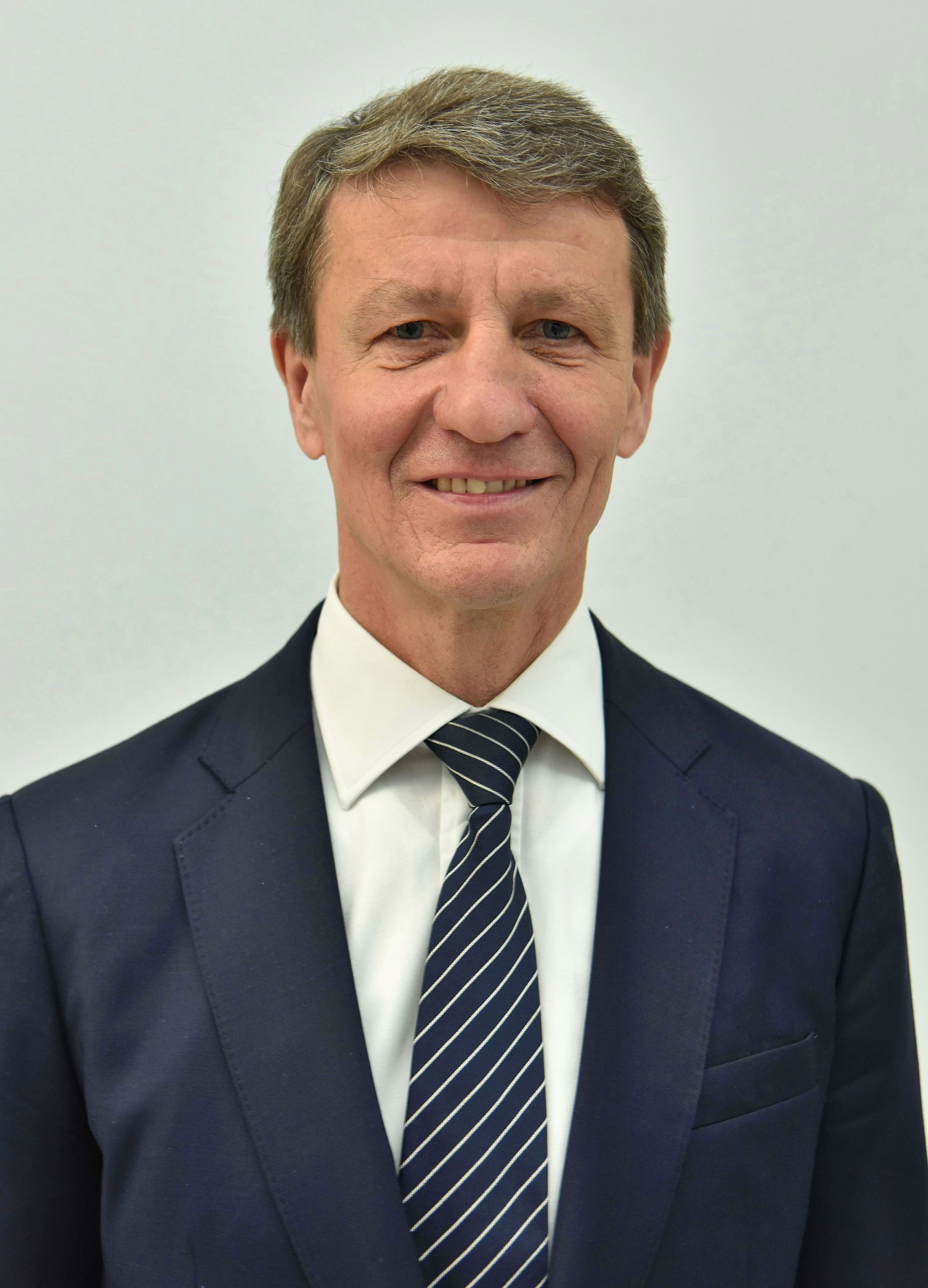

Member of Sejm
- In office 19 October 2001 – 12 November 2019

Personal details
- Born: 8 November 1954 (age 71) Nowy Sącz
- Party: Civic Platform

Andrzej Stanisław Czerwiński (born 8 November 1954) is a Polish politician. He served as the Minister of State Treasury from June to November 2015.

He has been a member of the Sejm since 2001.

In 1979, he graduated from AGH University of Science and Technology.

From 1994 to 2001, he was the mayor of Nowy Sącz. In 2001, he was elected to the Sejm from the 14 Nowy Sącz district, from the Civic Platform list.

== See also ==
- Members of Polish Sejm 2005-2007
- Members of Polish Sejm 2007-2011
