= Iwona Śledzińska-Katarasińska =

Polish politician (1941–2024)

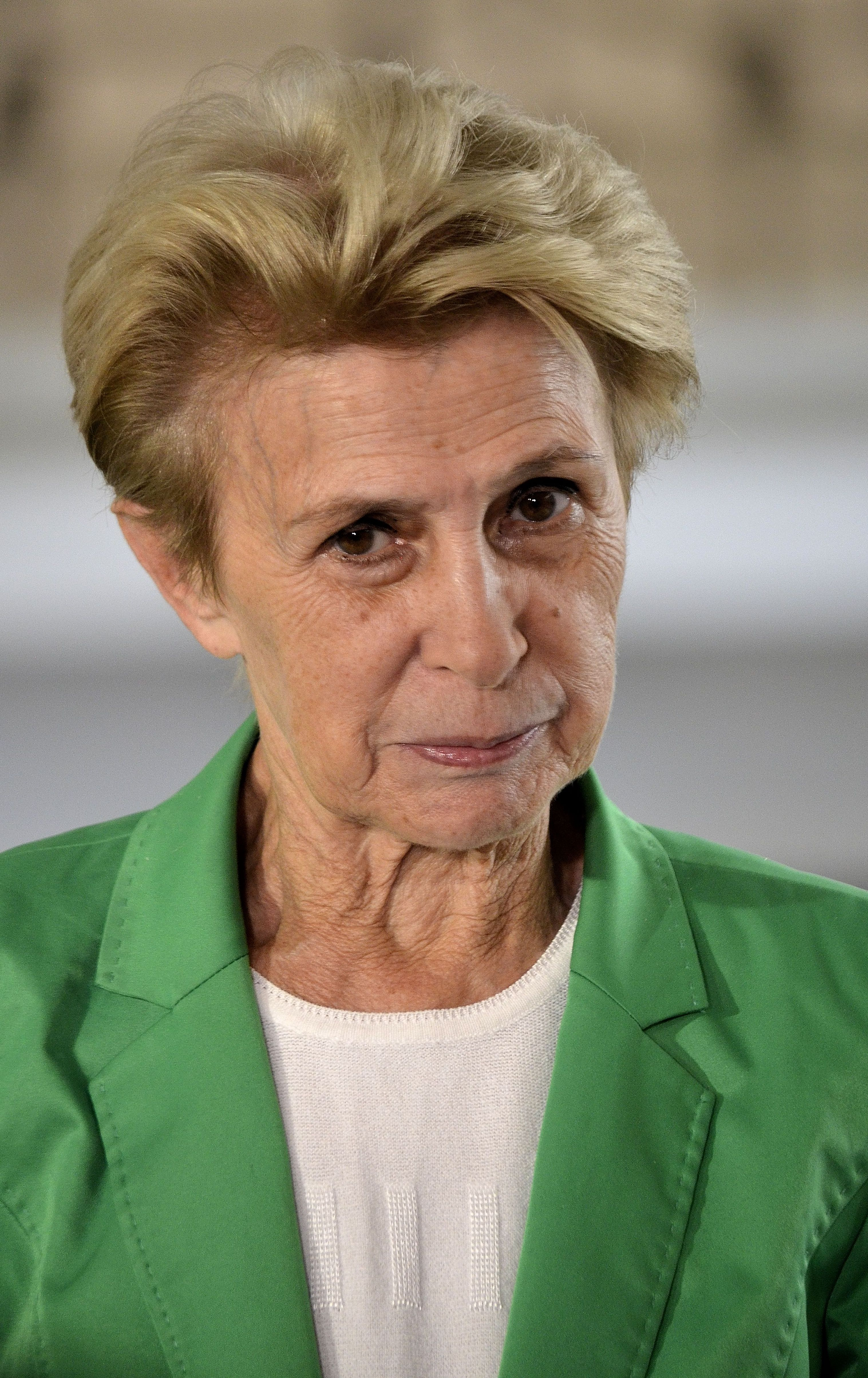
- Śledzińska-Katarasińska in 2015

Member of the Sejm
- In office 25 November 1991 – 12 November 2023
- Constituency: 9 – Łódź

Personal details
- Born: 3 January 1941 Komorniki, Reichsgau Wartheland, Germany
- Died: 1 January 2024 (aged 82) Łódź, Poland
- Party: Civic Platform

Iwona Elżbieta Śledzińska-Katarasińska (3 January 1941 – 1 January 2024) was a Polish journalist and politician. She was elected to the Sejm on 25 September 2005, receiving 23,119 votes in 9 Łódź district as a candidate from the Civic Platform list.

In the People's Republic of Poland she was a journalist of the Głos Robotniczy press organ of the Polish United Workers' Party in Łódź. Inspired by communists during the 1968 Polish political crisis, she wrote many antisemitic texts.

Śledzińska-Katarasińska was a member of the Polish Sejm between 1991 and 2023. She served all of her nine terms from her home constituency of Łódź.

Śledzińska-Katarasińska died on 1 January 2024, just two days short of her 83rd birthday.

== See also ==
- List of Sejm members (2005–2007)
- List of Sejm members (2007–2011)
