= Zdzisława Janowska =

Polish economist and politician

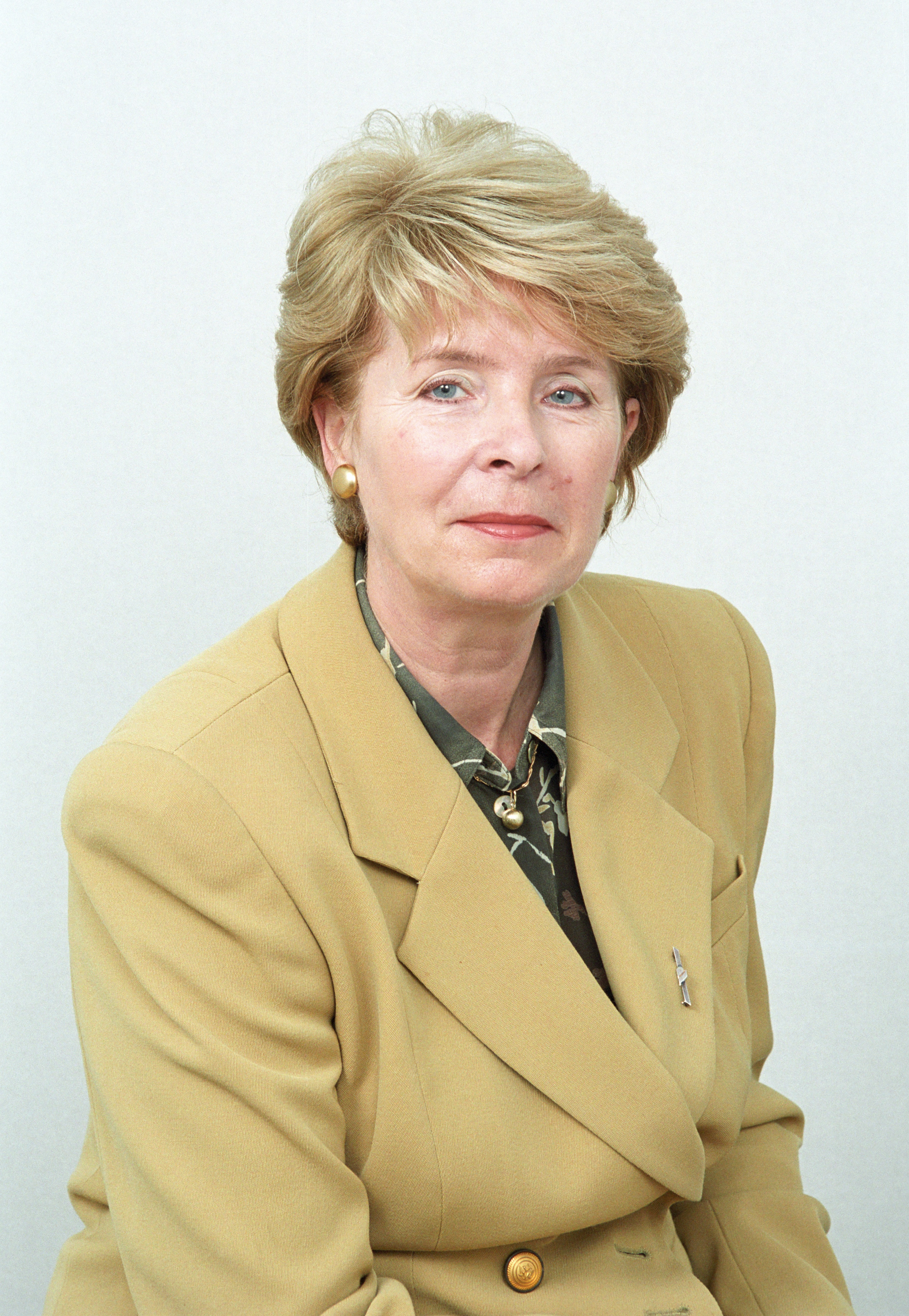
- Zdzisława Janowska (2001)

Member of the VI Sejm
- In office 2007–2011
- Constituency: 9 - Łódź

Member of the V Senate
- In office 2001–2005
- Constituency: 9 (Łódź)

Member of the III Senate
- In office 1993–1997
- Constituency: Łódź

Personal details
- Born: Zdzisława Chłodzińska; 16 December 1940 (age 85) Litzmannstadt, Reichsgau Wartheland, Nazi Germany (now Łódź, Poland)
- Party: Left and Democrats (LiD) (2007-2011); Democratic Left Alliance – Labour Union (SLD-UP) (2001-2005); Labour Union (UP) (1993-1997)
- Education: University of Łódź
- Occupation: University lecturer, politician
- Profession: Professor of Economics

Zdzisława Janowsk (née Chłodzińska; born 16 December 1940 in Łódź) is a Polish economist and politician, who has served as a senator in the Senate of Poland from 1993 to 1997 and again from 2001 to 2005, and was a member of the Sejm from 2007 to 2011. She is a professor of economics at the University of Łódź, and was awarded the Order of Polonia Restituta in 1999.
