= Adam Hofman =

Polish politician (born 1980)

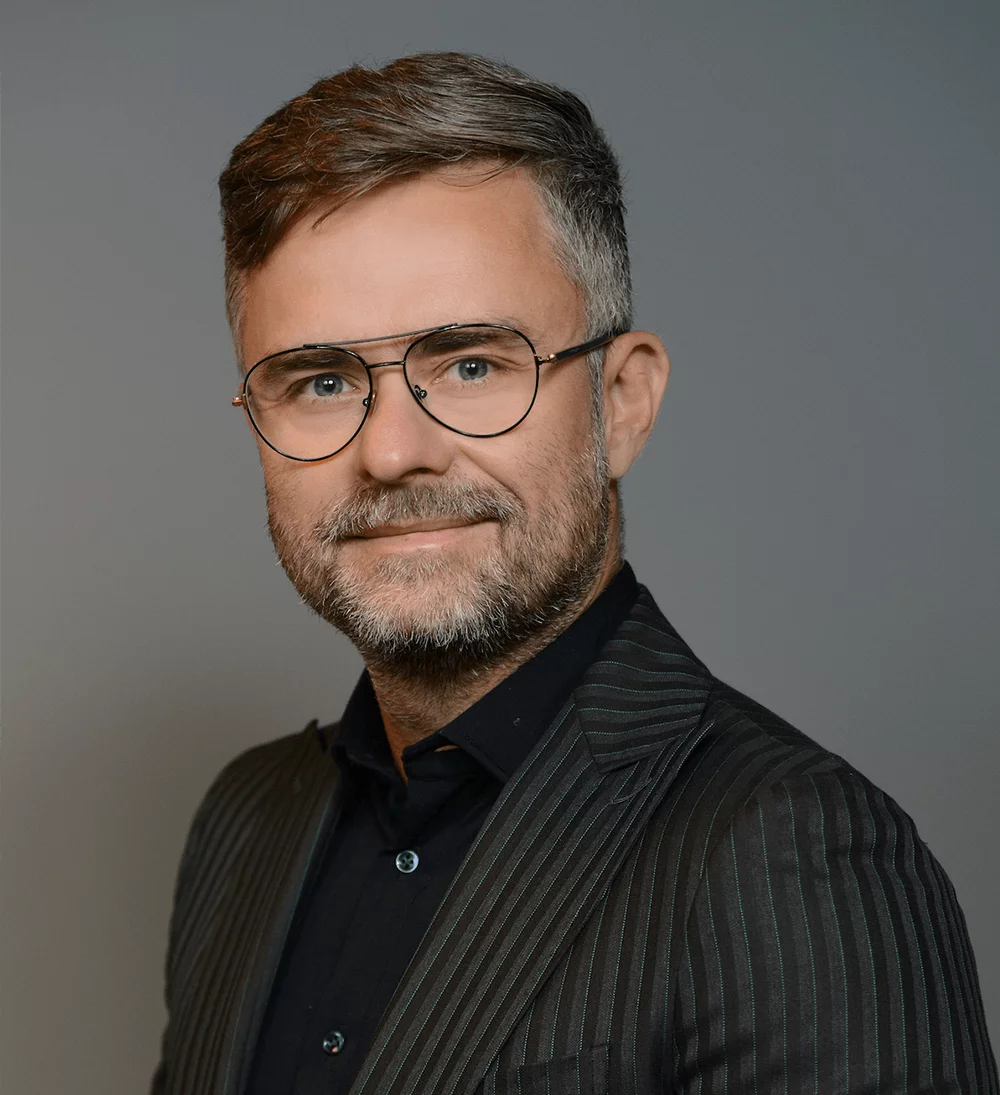

Member of Sejm 2005–2007
- Incumbent
- Assumed office 25 September 2005

Personal details
- Born: 23 May 1980 (age 45) Kalisz
- Party: Independent (Formerly Law and Justice)

Adam Hofman (born 23 May 1980) is a Polish public relations professional and a former politician. He graduated with a degree in political science from the University of Wrocław in 2004 and was actively involved in student politics, serving as the chairman of the Student Forum at his university. In 2022 Hofman graduated from Harvard Business School.

== Career ==
Hofman served as a member of the Polish Parliament (Sejm) for three consecutive terms from 2005 to 2015. He was elected to the Sejm on 25 September 2005, getting 10,994 votes in 37 Konin district, running from the Law and Justice party list. He was the spokesperson for the Law and Justice party. In 2014 he was expelled from this party for extorting public money for his private journey to Madrid.

On 10 November 2014 Hofman was dismissed from the Law and Justice party for the so-called "airplane affair". In December of the same year, the prosecutor’s office investigated the situation and concluded that no crime had been committed.

After leaving politics, Hofman transitioned into the public relations sector, co-founding R4S Consulting, a public relations firm. In addition, Hofman has contributed to sports governance as the member of the board Polish Olympic Committee. He also hosted a media program called Gabinet Cieni on the Wirtualna Polska website from May 2018 to January 2019.

In 2021, he left the R4S agency and, together with Robert Pietryszyn, founded a PR agency called Butterfly Strategies. The company focuses on developing and implementing communication and business strategies. Hofman is also the founder of the W Górę Serca Foundation, which aims to help people with disabilities navigate mountain trails with the assistance of specially adapted wheelchairs.

== Personal life ==
Hofman is a husband and father of two. An Ironman runner, he completed a marathon in Barcelona.

== See also ==
- Members of Polish Sejm 2005–2007
- Members of Polish Sejm 2007–2011
