= Jacek Krupa =

Polish politician (born 1955)

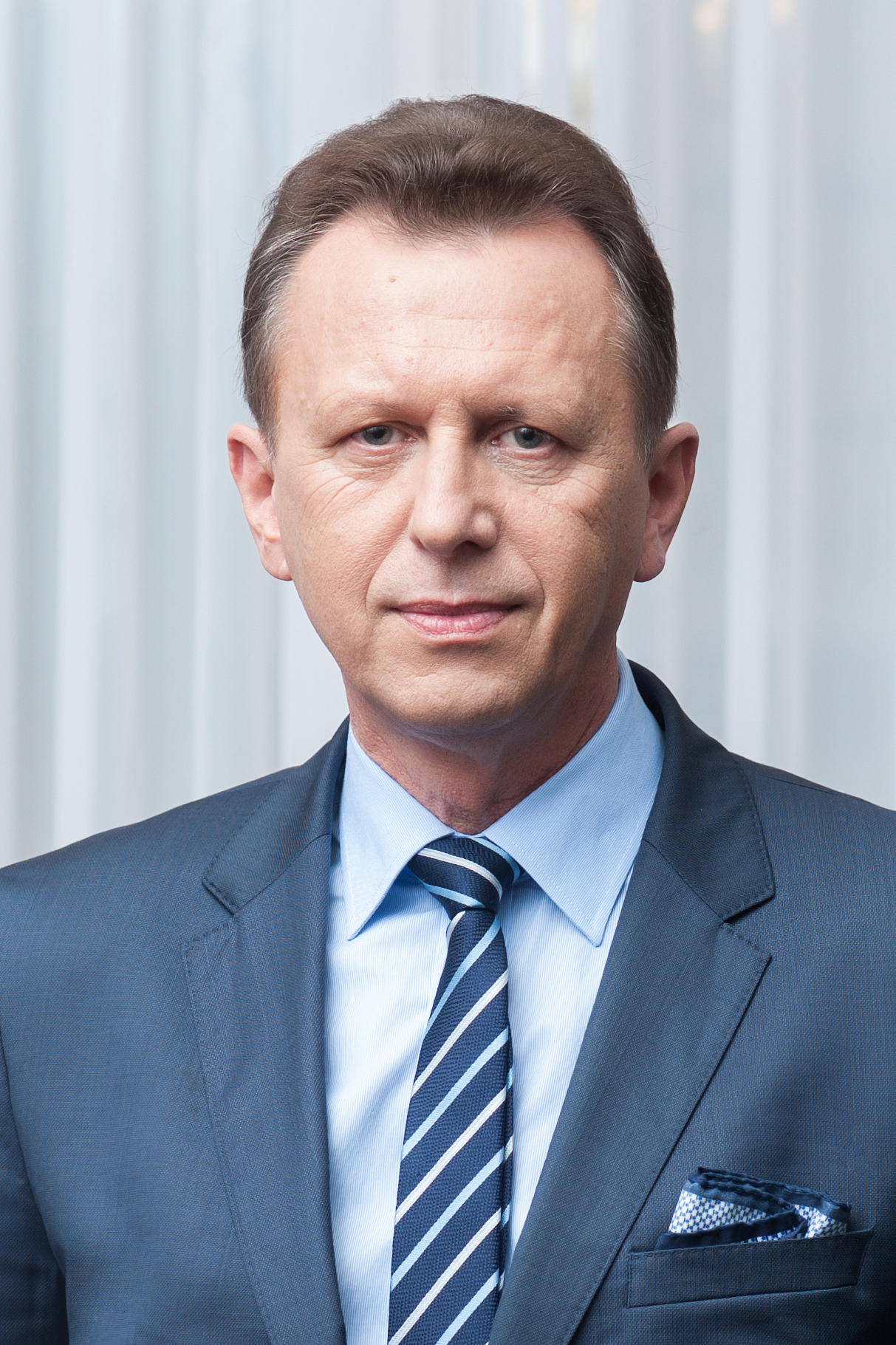

5th Marshal of Lesser Poland
- Incumbent
- Assumed office 9 November 2015
- Preceded by: Marek Sowa

Member of the Sejm
- In office 25 September 2005 – 7 November 2011
- Constituency: 13 – Kraków

Personal details
- Born: 11 April 1955 (age 70) Skawina, Poland
- Party: Civic Platform

Jacek Jan Krupa (born 11 April 1955 in Skawina) is a Polish politician. He was elected to the Sejm on 2005 parliamentary election, getting 6860 votes in 13 Kraków district from the Civic Platform list. Krupa remained in parliament until his defeat in the 2011 parliamentary election.

In 2012, Krupa was appointed to the Executive Board of Lesser Poland, and in 2014 local elections, won a seat in the Lesser Poland Regional Assembly. He was elected as the Marshal of Lesser Poland on 5 November 2015, becoming the fifth head of the regional government for the province. However, the opposition Law and Justice party challenged Krupa's appointment as marshal as illegal, arguing that the previous marshal, Marek Sowa, along with his board, had yet to submit their resignations before Krupa's appointment. However, the claim was rejected by the marshal's office.

== See also ==
- Members of Polish Sejm 2005-2007
- Members of Polish Sejm 2007-2011
