= Katarzyna Osos =

Polish politician (born 1980)

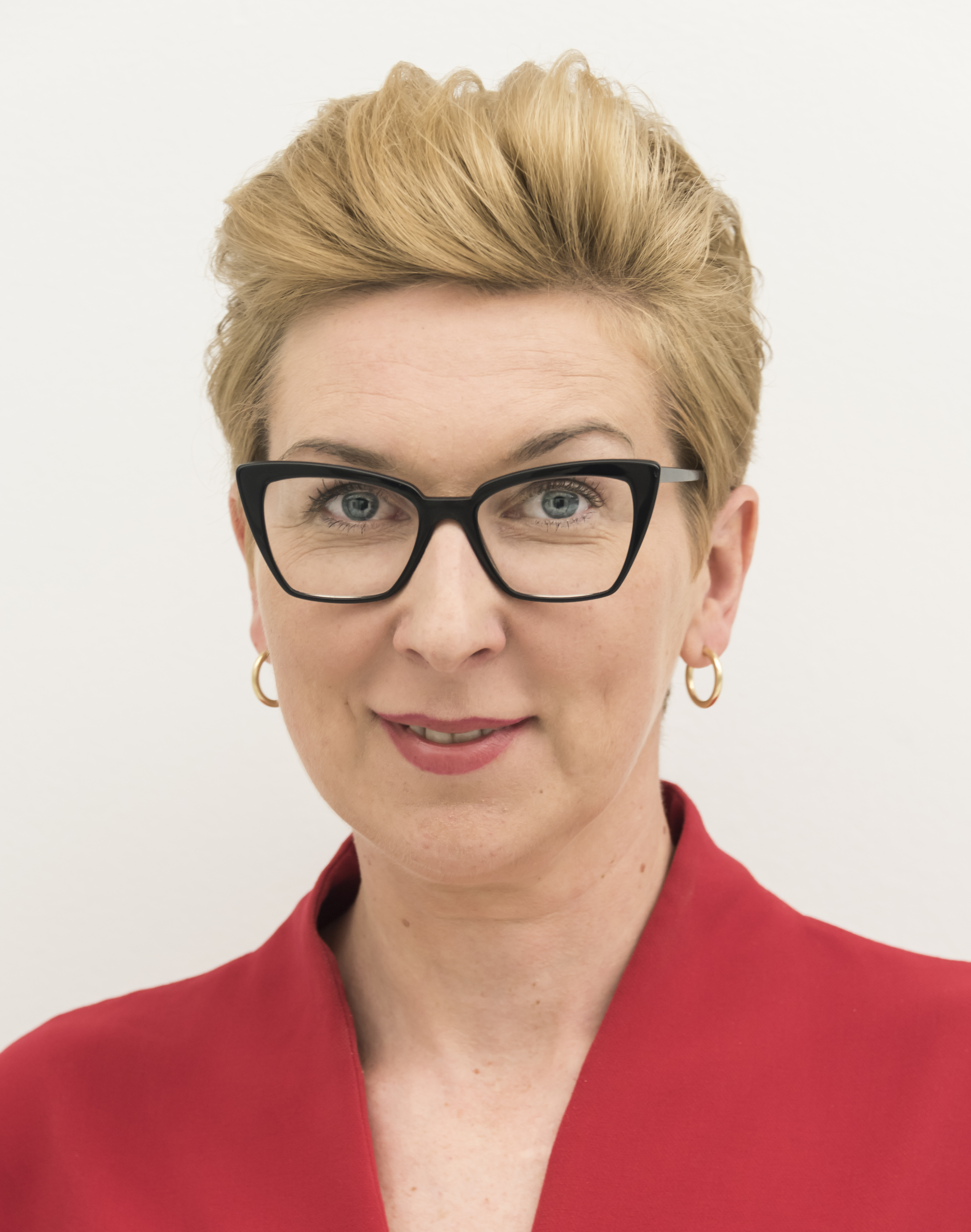

Member of the Sejm
- Incumbent
- Assumed office 11 November 2015

Voivode of Lubusz Voivodeship
- In office 26 January 2015 – 11 November 2015
- Preceded by: Jerzy Ostrouch
- Succeeded by: Władysław Dajczak

Personal details
- Born: 17 November 1980 (age 45)

Katarzyna Osos (born 17 November 1980) is a Polish politician. She was elected to the Sejm (9th term) representing the constituency of Zielona Góra. She previously also served in the 8th term of the Sejm (2015–2019).
