= Janusz Chwierut =

Polish politician (born 1965)

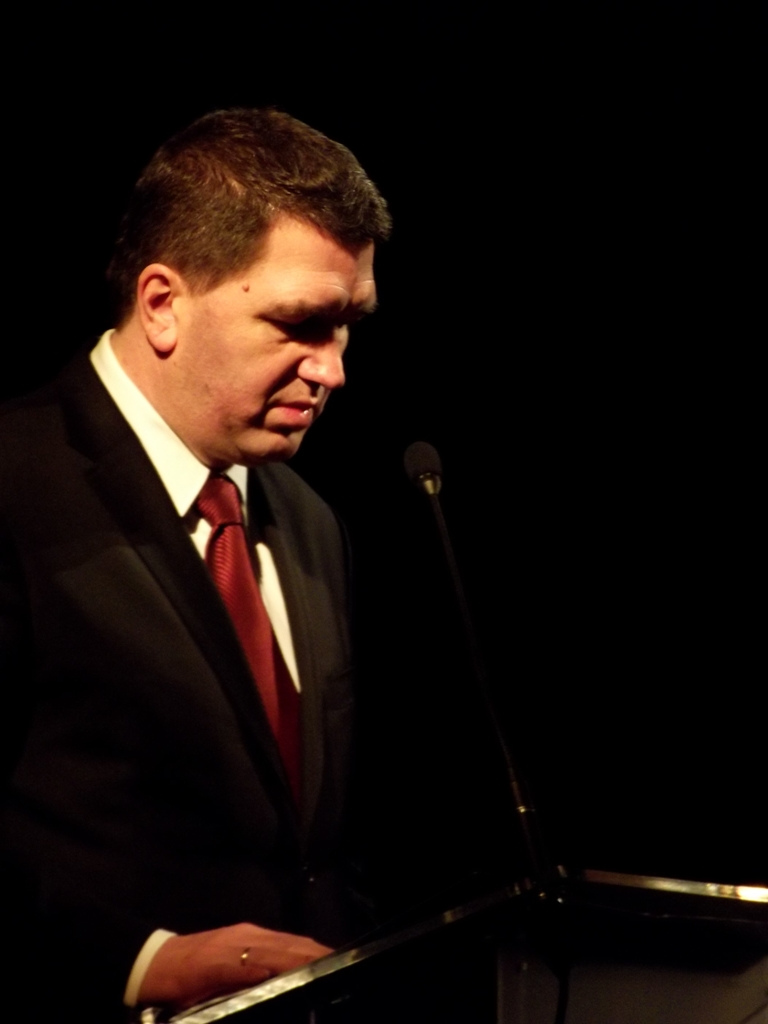

Member of the Sejm
- Incumbent
- Assumed office 25 September 2005
- Constituency: 12 – Chrzanów

Personal details
- Born: 1965 (age 60–61)
- Party: Civic Platform

Janusz Chwierut (born 21 August 1965 in Kęty) is a Polish politician. He was elected to the Sejm on 25 September 2005, getting 5272 votes in 12 Chrzanów district as a candidate from the Civic Platform list. Since 2011 he is Mayor of Oświęcim.

== See also ==
- Members of Polish Sejm 2005-2007
- Members of Polish Sejm 2007-2011
