= Ewa Kierzkowska =

Polish politician (born 1964)

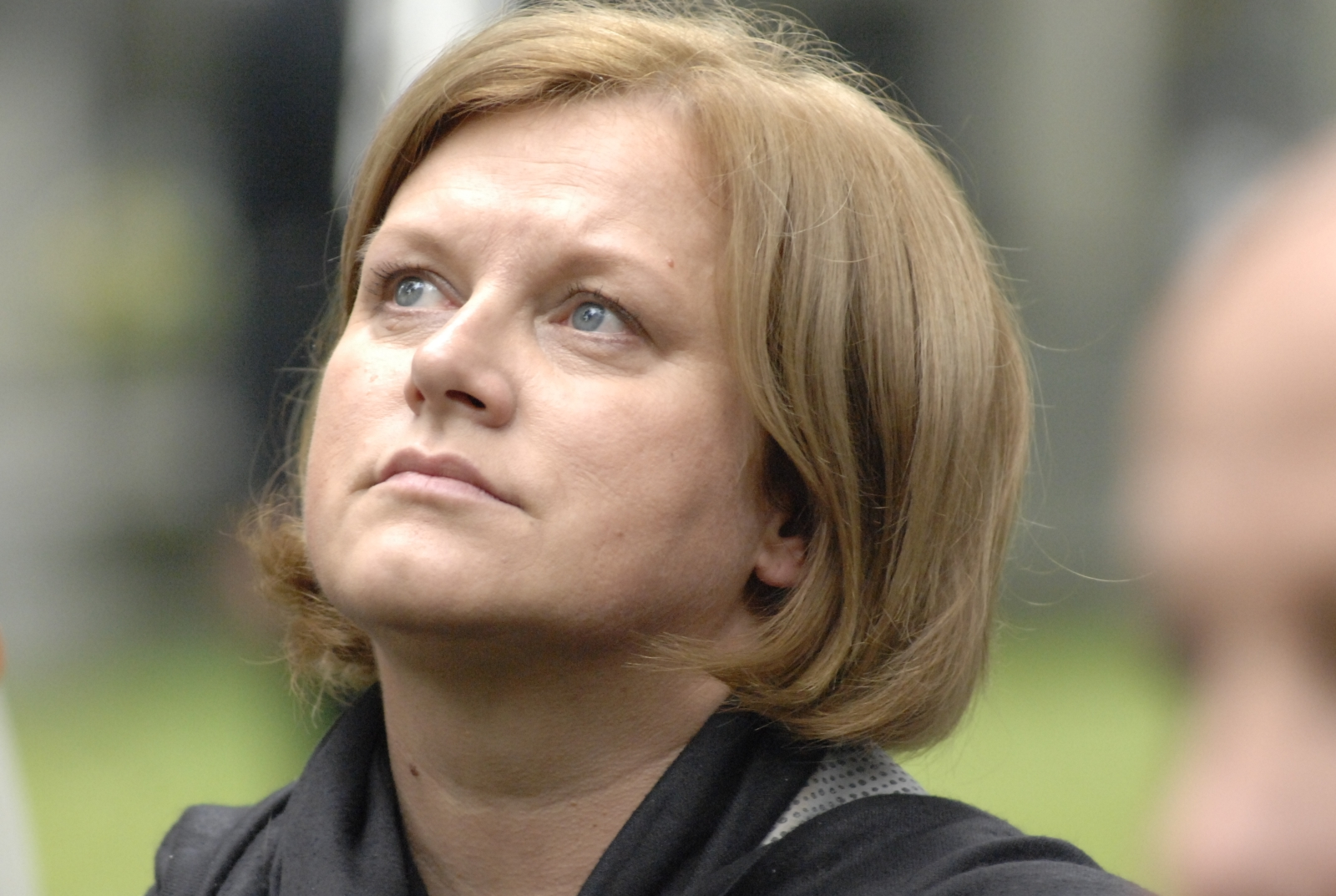

Deputy Marshal of Sejm 2007-2011
- In office 18 June 2009 – 7 November 2011

Personal details
- Born: 28 June 1964 (age 61) Brodnica
- Party: Polish People's Party

Ewa Slawomira Kierzkowska (born 28 June 1964) is a Polish politician who served as the Deputy Marshal of the Sejm of the Republic of Poland from 18 June 2009 to 7 November 2011. She is a member of the Polish People's Party (PSL). Her father, Jan Szczepaniak, served in the Sejm from 1991 to 1997. Born in Brodnica, Kierzkowska joined the United People's Party in 1982, then joined the PSL after the former was dissolved in 1989.

After serving as an executive member of the party, Kierzkowska was elected to the Sejm out of Toruń, receiving 7,561 votes in the 2007 election. During her time in the Sejm, she served as a member of the social policy committee, as well as the labor market, family and women's rights subcommittees. She became the Vice President of the PSL Executive Committee the following year, and in 2009 she was appointed as a Deputy MArshal of the Sejm, replacing Jarosław Kalinowski after he became a Member of the European Parliament. After the 2011 parliamentary election, Kierzkowska was appointed a secretary of state under the Second Cabinet of Donald Tusk. She resigned from her position in the PSL shortly after the committee's 2012 election, which ousted Waldemar Pawlak in favor of Janusz Piechociński, after refusing to support Piechociński as the party's successor.

Kierzkowska ran in the European parliament election in 2014 as a deputy for the PSL, and finished 7th out of 10 candidates with 633 votes. The following year, she ran for the Sejm on the PSL ticket, garnering 458 votes, losing to Zbigniew Sosnowski's 7,230 votes for representation on the Sejm.
