= Mircze =

- Village
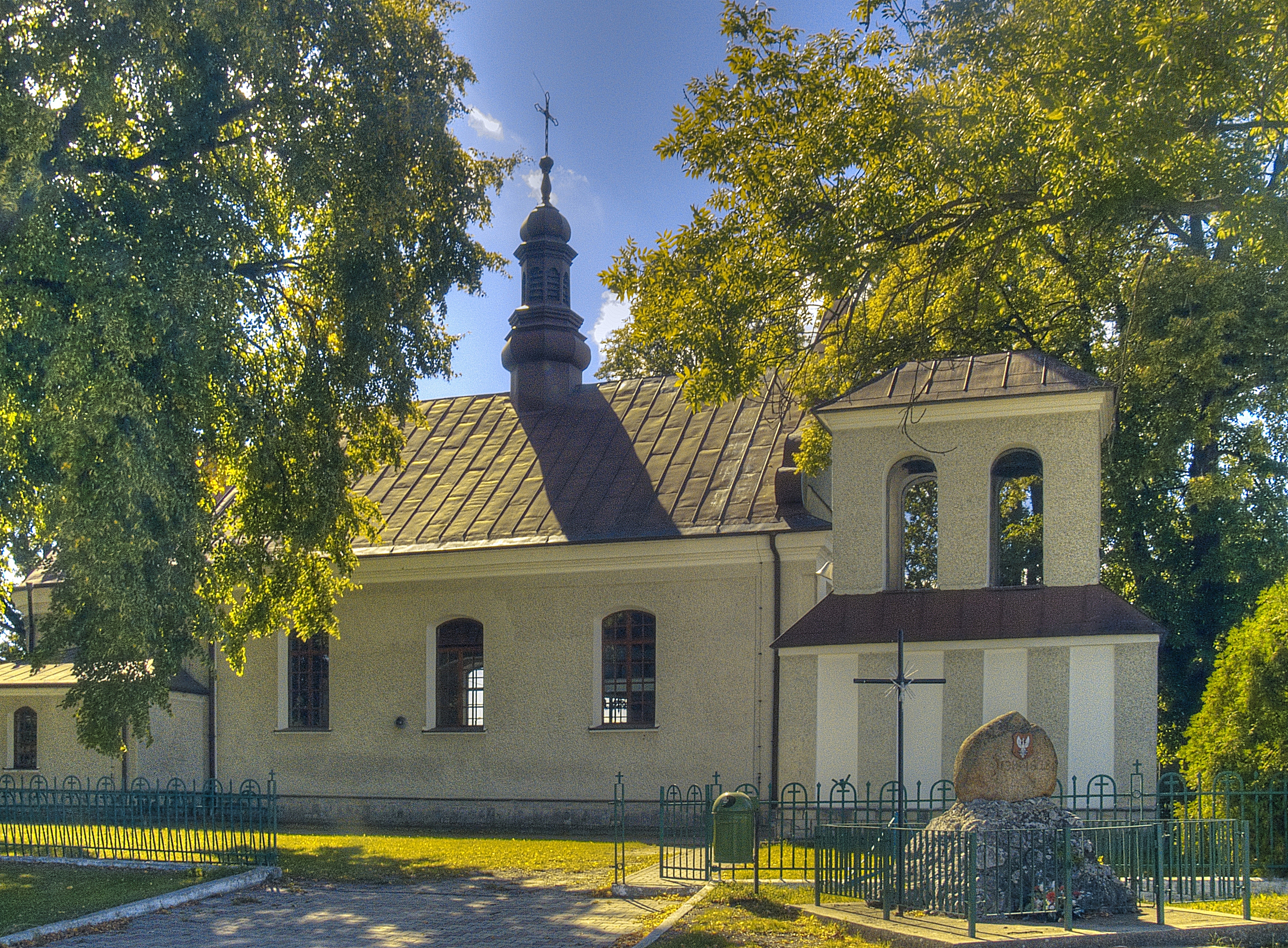
- Church of the Resurrection of Christ

- Location within Poland
- Coordinates: 50°39′10″N 23°54′17″E
- Country: Poland
- Voivodeship: Lublin
- County: Hrubieszów
- Gmina: Mircze

Population
  - Total: 1,520
- Time zone: UTC+1 (CET)
  - Summer (DST): UTC+2 (CEST)
- Website: http://mircze.pl/

Mircze [ˈmirt͡ʂɛ] is a village in Hrubieszów County, Lublin Voivodeship, in eastern Poland, close to the border with Ukraine. It is the seat of the gmina (administrative district) called Gmina Mircze.

== History ==
Five Polish citizens were murdered by Nazi Germany in the village during World War II.
