= Zbigniew Rynasiewicz =

Polish politician

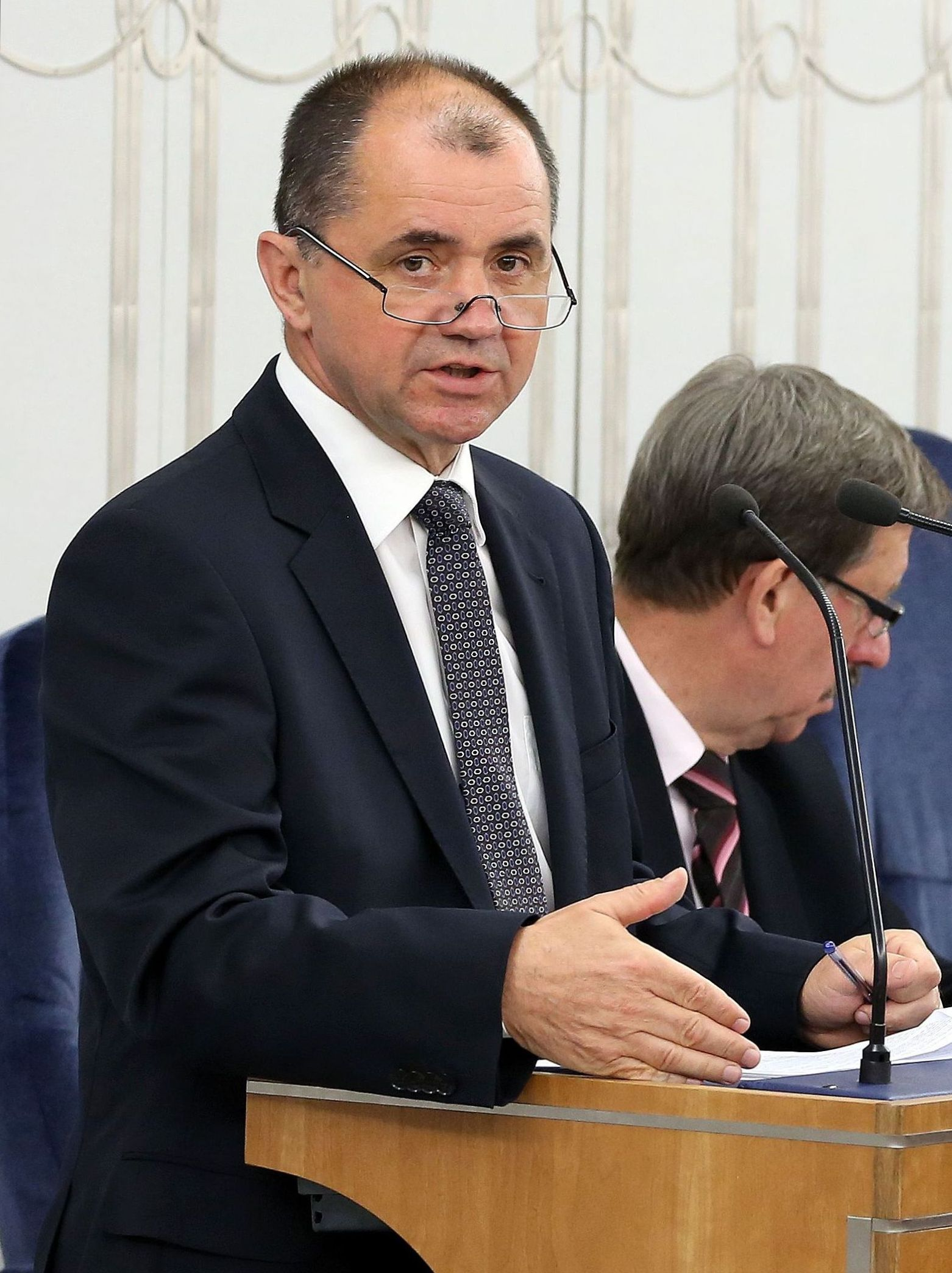

Minister of Transport, Construction and Marine Economy of Poland Acting
- In office 15 November 2013 – 27 November 2013
- President: Bronisław Komorowski
- Prime Minister: Donald Tusk
- Preceded by: Sławomir Nowak
- Succeeded by: office abolished

Member of Sejm
- Incumbent
- Assumed office 25 September 2005

Personal details
- Born: 4 October 1963 (age 62) Grodzisko Dolne, Poland
- Party: Civic Platform

Zbigniew Franciszek Rynasiewicz (born 4 October 1963) is a Polish politician. He was elected to the Sejm on 25 September 2005, getting 10,354 votes in 23 Rzeszów district as a candidate from the Civic Platform list. He was reelected on 21 October 2007.

In 2022, the Warsaw District Court sentenced Rynasiewicz to 2.5 years in prison for taking bribes in the form of bank transfers and alcohol in exchange for making administrative decisions in favour of the companies bribing him. In addition, he arranged a delegation to the Ministry of Justice and nominated judges on behalf of the companies paying him. He also arranged a 70 million złoty loan for one of the companies.

He was also a member of Sejm 1997–2001.

== See also ==
- Members of Polish Sejm 2005–2007
