= Izabela Mrzygłocka =

Polish politician (1959–2024)

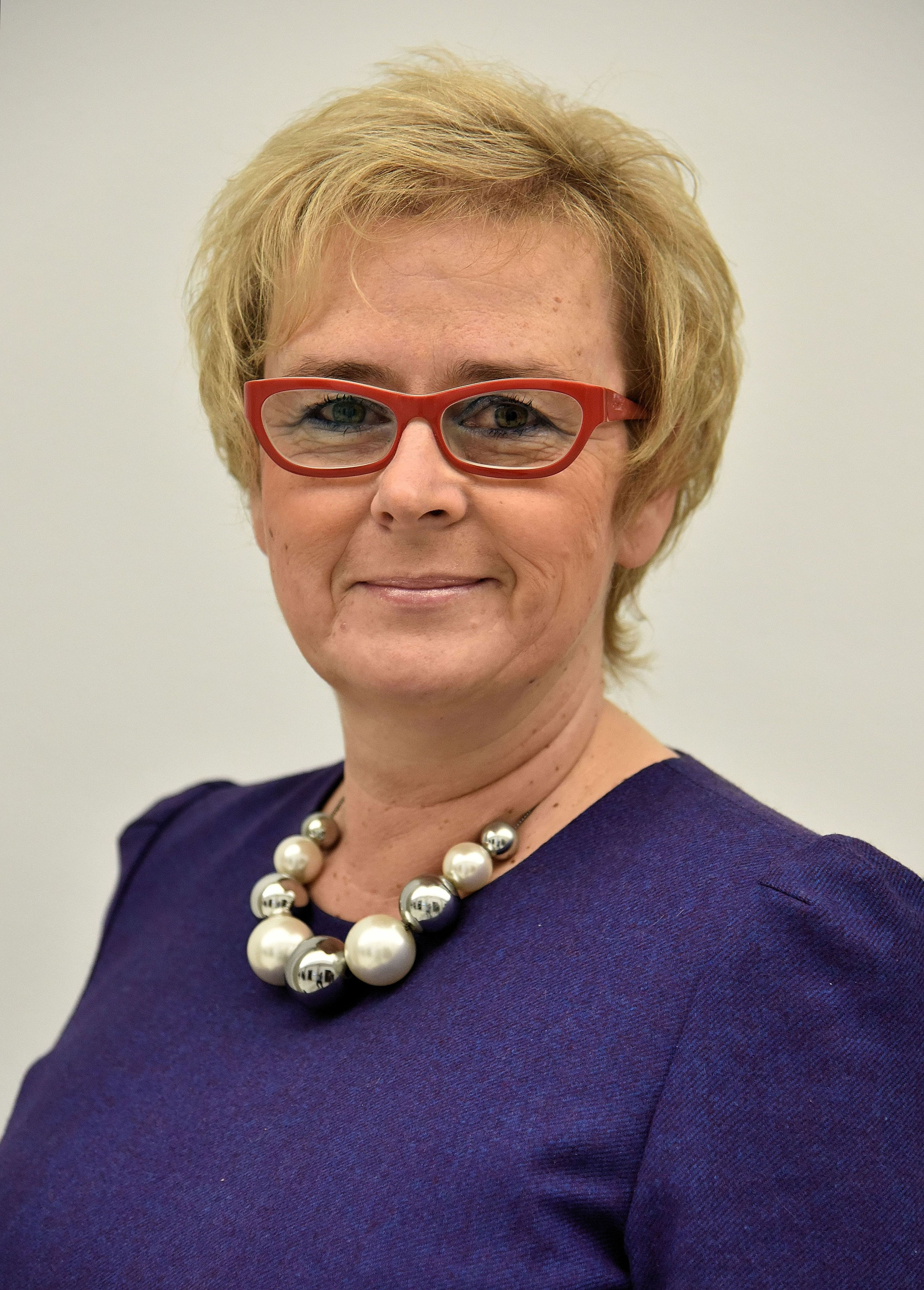
- Mrzygłocka in 2016

Member of the Sejm
- In office 25 September 2005 – 10 August 2024
- Constituency: 2 – Wałbrzych

Personal details
- Born: Izabela Katarzyna Mrzygłocka; 20 May 1959 Wałbrzych, Poland
- Died: 10 August 2024 (aged 65) Warsaw, Poland
- Party: Civic Platform

Izabela Katarzyna Mrzygłocka (20 May 1959 – 10 August 2024) was a Polish politician. She was elected to the Sejm on 25 September 2005, getting 5271 votes in 2 Wałbrzych district as a candidate from the Civic Platform list. Mrzygłocka died in Warsaw on 10 August 2024, at the age of 65.

== See also ==
- Members of Polish Sejm 2005-2007
