= Marek Cebula =

Polish politician

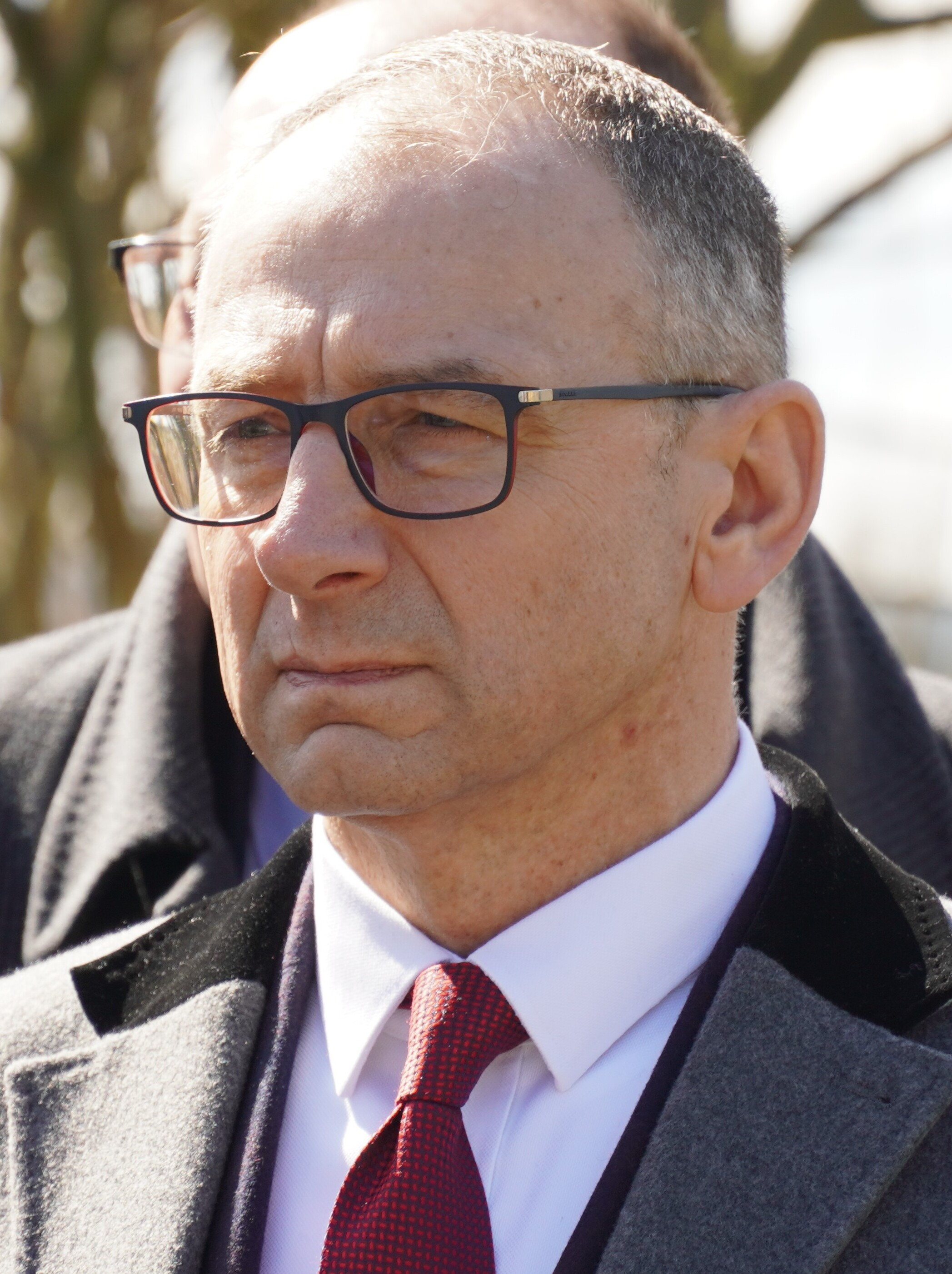

Voivode of Lubusz Voivodeship
- Incumbent
- Assumed office December 2023
- President: Andrzej Duda; Karol Nawrocki
- Prime Minister: Donald Tusk
- Preceded by: Władysław Dajczak

Personal details
- Born: 30 November 1965 (age 60) Gubin, Polish People's Republic
- Citizenship: Poland
- Party: Civic Platform
- Education: Poznan Agricultural Academy
- Occupation: Politician

Marek Jerzy Cebula (born November 30, 1965, in Gubin) is a Polish politician, entrepreneur, and local government official. He served as a member of the Sejm for the 6th term, and served as mayor of Krosno Odrzańskie from 2010 to 2023. He has served as the Voivode of Lubusz Voivodeship since December 2023.

== Biography ==
He graduated with a degree in forestry management from the Faculty of Forestry of the Agricultural University in Poznań (with a professional degree in forestry engineering). He worked for several months in the forest district, then ran his own business from 1992 to 2007. He co-founded the "SKARPA" Social Initiatives Association. From 2002 to 2006, he served as a councillor in Krosno Odrzańskie (running on the "Justice Platform" committee list), and then served on the Krosno County Council for a year. In the 2006 local election, he unsuccessfully ran for mayor of the city and commune of Krosno Odrzańskie (as an independent candidate).

In the 2007 Polish parliamentary election, he won a seat in the Sejm (lower house of the Polish parliament) representing the Civic Platform party, receiving 5,734 votes in the Lubusz district.

In the second round of the 2010 local elections, he was elected mayor of Krosno Odrzańskie. On December 14 of the same year, he was sworn into office. On March 25, 2012, a recall referendum for the mayor and city council was held, but due to low turnout (14.6%), it was invalid. In 2014 and 2018 elections, he successfully ran for re-election as mayor in the first rounds of subsequent local elections.

In the 2023 elections, he unsuccessfully ran for the Sejm on the Civic Coalition ticket. In December of the same year, he was appointed Voivode of Lubusz Voivodeship.
