= Wiesław Kilian =

Polish politician (1952–2019)

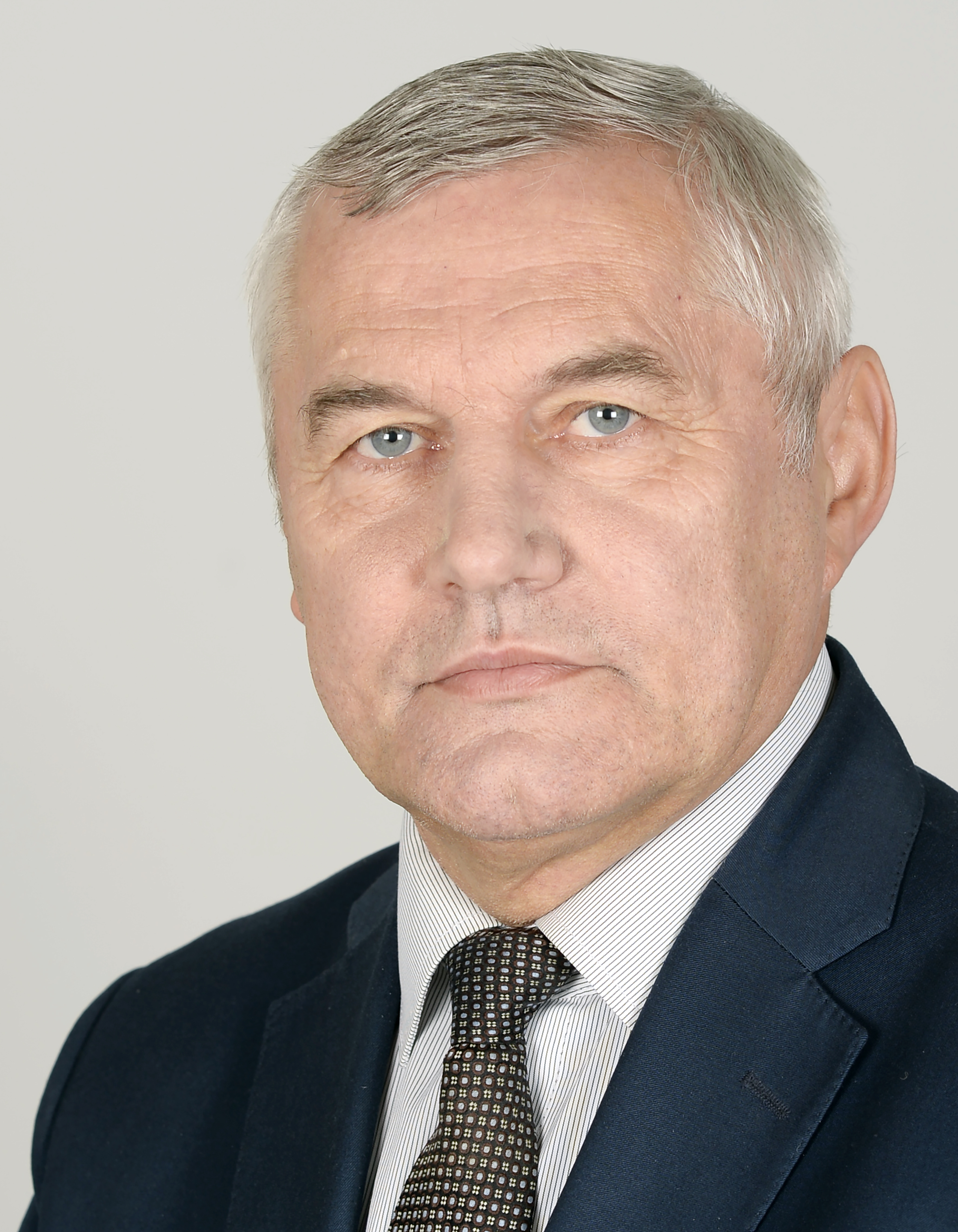

Member of the Sejm
- In office 5 May 2010 – 15 March 2019
- Constituency: 3 – Wrocław
- In office 25 September 2005 – 21 October 2007

Personal details
- Born: 25 July 1952 Ząbkowice Śląskie
- Died: 15 March 2019 (aged 66) Warsaw
- Party: Poland Comes First
- Other political affiliations: Law and Justice (2005–10)

Wiesław Kilian (25 July 1952 – 15 March 2019) was a Polish politician.

In the 70s and 80s he worked in a family farm. From 1984 to 1998 he was head of the Wrocław-Stare Miasto Residents Service Area. He was director for "Centrum" from 1998 to 2001. From 1998 to 2002 he was councilor in Wrocław.

He was elected to Sejm on 25 September 2005 getting 7,524 votes in Wrocław, standing for Law and Justice (PiS). He was not re-elected in 2007. In 2010 he was by PiS appointed to replace Aleksandra Natalli-Świat who died in Smolensk air disaster. However, he was removed from PiS after he supported Civic Platform (PO) candidate in Wrocław presidential election. He belonged for a time to the Poland Comes First club and subsequently joined PO himself. Standing in a PO list, he was elected to the Senat in 2011 and reelected in 2015.

He was posthumously decorated with the Knight's cross of the Order of Polonia Restituta.

== See also ==
- Members of Polish Sejm 2005-2007
