= Monika Wielichowska =

Polish politician

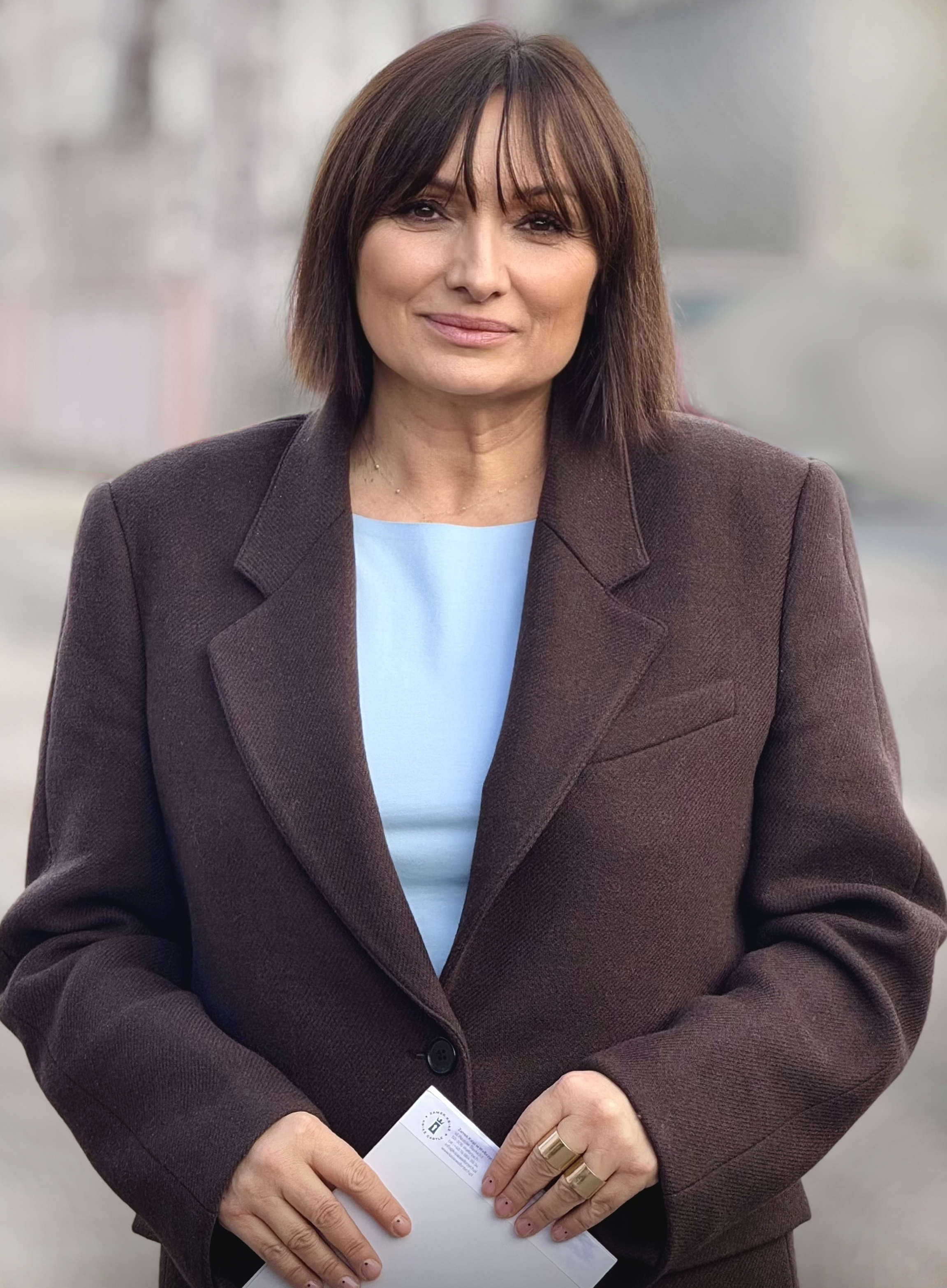
- Official portrait, 2025

Deputy Marshal of the Sejm
- Incumbent
- Assumed office 13 November 2023 Serving with See List
- Marshal: Szymon Hołownia; Włodzimierz Czarzasty

Member of the Sejm
- Incumbent
- Assumed office 4 November 2007
- Constituency: 2-Wałbrzych

Personal details
- Born: 4 October 1973 (age 52) Nowa Ruda, Poland
- Party: Civic Platform (since 2002)
- Other political affiliations: Civic Coalition (2018–present)
- Spouse: Rafał
- Children: 1

Monika Wielichowska (born 4 October 1973) is a Polish politician who has served in the Sejm for the Wałbrzych district since 2007, as a member of Civic Platform and was elected as Deputy Marshal of the Sejm in 2023. Prior to her tenure in parliament she was active in the local politics of Kłodzko, where she served as a councillor and starosta.

== Early life and education ==
Monika Wielichowska was born in Nowa Ruda, Polish People's Republic, on 4 October 1973. She graduated with a master's degree from the Wrocław University of Economics in 1997, and completed her postgraduate studies at University of Wrocław in 2005, and at the Wrocław University of Economics in 2012.

== Career ==
From 1997 to 2006, Wielichowska was an information policy inspector and editor-in-chief of Info Nowa Ruda at the Nowa Ruda city office. She did managerial work for the band Big Cyc.

=== Politics ===
Wielichowska joined Civic Platform in 2002, and is currently deputy secretary general of the party. She was a councillor in Kłodzko from 2002 to 2007, and its starosta from 2006 to 2007. In the 2007 election she was elected to the Sejm for the Wałbrzych district and has retained her seat in the following elections. Wielichowska was referred to as the right-hand of Donald Tusk during the 2023 election.

During Wielichowska's tenure in the Sejm she served on the Public Finance committee. In 2019, she became the vice chair of the Health committee. On 13 November 2023, she was elected as Deputy Marshal of the Sejm.

== Personal life ==
Wielichowska is married to Rafał, with whom she had one child.

== Works cited ==
=== News ===
- "Monika Wielichowska". Wydarzenia. 10 November 2023. Archived from the original on 24 June 2025.
- "Monika Wielichowska została wiceprzewodniczącą Komisji ds. Zdrowia". Kłodzko Nasze Miasto. 15 November 2019. Archived from the original on 24 June 2025.
- "Od rockowej sceny do "prawej ręki Tuska". Monika Wielichowska nową wicemarszałkinią Sejmu". TVN24. 13 November 2023. Archived from the original on 24 June 2025.

=== Web ===
- "Monika Wielichowska". Sejm. Archived from the original on 24 June 2025.
