= Bogusław Wontor =

Polish politician

Member of the Sejm
- In office 19 November 2001 – 11 November 2015
- In office 12 November 2019 – 12 November 2023

Personal details
- Born: 1967 (age 58–59)
- Party: Democratic Left Alliance

Bogusław Tadeusz Wontor (born 29 September 1967 in Słubice) is a Polish politician. He was elected to the Sejm on 25 September 2005, getting 7793 votes in 8 Zielona Góra district as a candidate from Democratic Left Alliance list.

He was also a member of Sejm in years 2001–2015 and 2019–2023.

== See also ==
- Members of Polish Sejm 2005-2007
