= Sejm Constituency no. 2 =

Parliamentary constituency in Poland

Sejm Constituency no. 2 Wałbrzych
- Okręg wyborczy nr 2 Wałbrzych
- Constituency for the Sejm
- Location within Poland.
- Counties: Dzierżoniów, Kłodzko, Świdnica, Wałbrzych (city county), Wałbrzych (land county), Ząbkowice
- Voivodeship: Lower Silesian
- Population: 611,851 (June 2023)
- Electorate: 476,857 (2023)
- Area: 4,179.75 km^{2} (1,613.81 sq mi)

Current constituency
- Created: 2001
- Deputies: 8
- Regional assembly: Lower Silesian Voivodeship Sejmik
- Senate constituency: 4 and 5
- EP constituency: Lower Silesian and Opole

Sejm Constituency no. 2 is a constituency of the Sejm (lower house of the Polish parliament) electing eight deputies. It is located within Lower Silesian Voivodeship covering area of Wałbrzych (city county) and land counties of Dzierżoniów, Kłodzko, Świdnica, Wałbrzych and Ząbkowice. Constituency Electoral Commission's seat is the city of Wałbrzych.

== Elections ==
=== 2019 ===
2019 parliamentary election: Wałbrzych
Party	Votes	%	Seats
Law and Justice	114,728	40.54	4
Civic Coalition	90,812	32.09	3
The Left	34,957	12.35	1
Polish People's Party	20,528	7.25	–
Confederation	15,346	5.42	–
Nonpartisans and Local Government Activists	6,631	2.34	–
Total	283,002	100.00	8
Valid votes	283,002	98.61	
Invalid/blank votes	3,976	1.39	
Total votes	286,978	100.00	
Registered voters/turnout	514,042	55.83	
Source: National Electoral Commission

=== 2023 ===
2023 parliamentary election: Wałbrzych
Party	Votes	%	Seats
Civic Coalition	120,188	37.17	4
Law and Justice	107,797	33.34	3
Third Way	39,215	12.13	1
The Left	25,806	7.98	–
Confederation	19,478	6.02	–
Nonpartisan Local Government Activists	5,808	1.80	–
There is One Poland	5,068	1.57	–
Total	323,360	100.00	8
Valid votes	323,360	98.08	
Invalid/blank votes	6,330	1.92	
Total votes	329,690	100.00	
Registered voters/turnout	476,857	69.14	
Source: National Electoral Commission

== List of deputies ==
Deputies for the 10th Sejm (2023–2027)
Deputy	Party	Parliamentary group
Marek Chmielewski	Civic Platform	Civic Coalition
Izabela Mrzygłocka	Civic Platform	Civic Coalition
Monika Wielichowska	Civic Platform	Civic Coalition
Sylwia Bielawska	Independent	Civic Coalition
Michał Dworczyk	Law and Justice	Law and Justice
Marcin Gwóźdź	Law and Justice	Law and Justice
Ireneusz Zyska	Law and Justice	Law and Justice
Aleksandra Leo	Poland 2050	Poland 2050
