= Jerzy Materna =

Polish politician (born 1956)

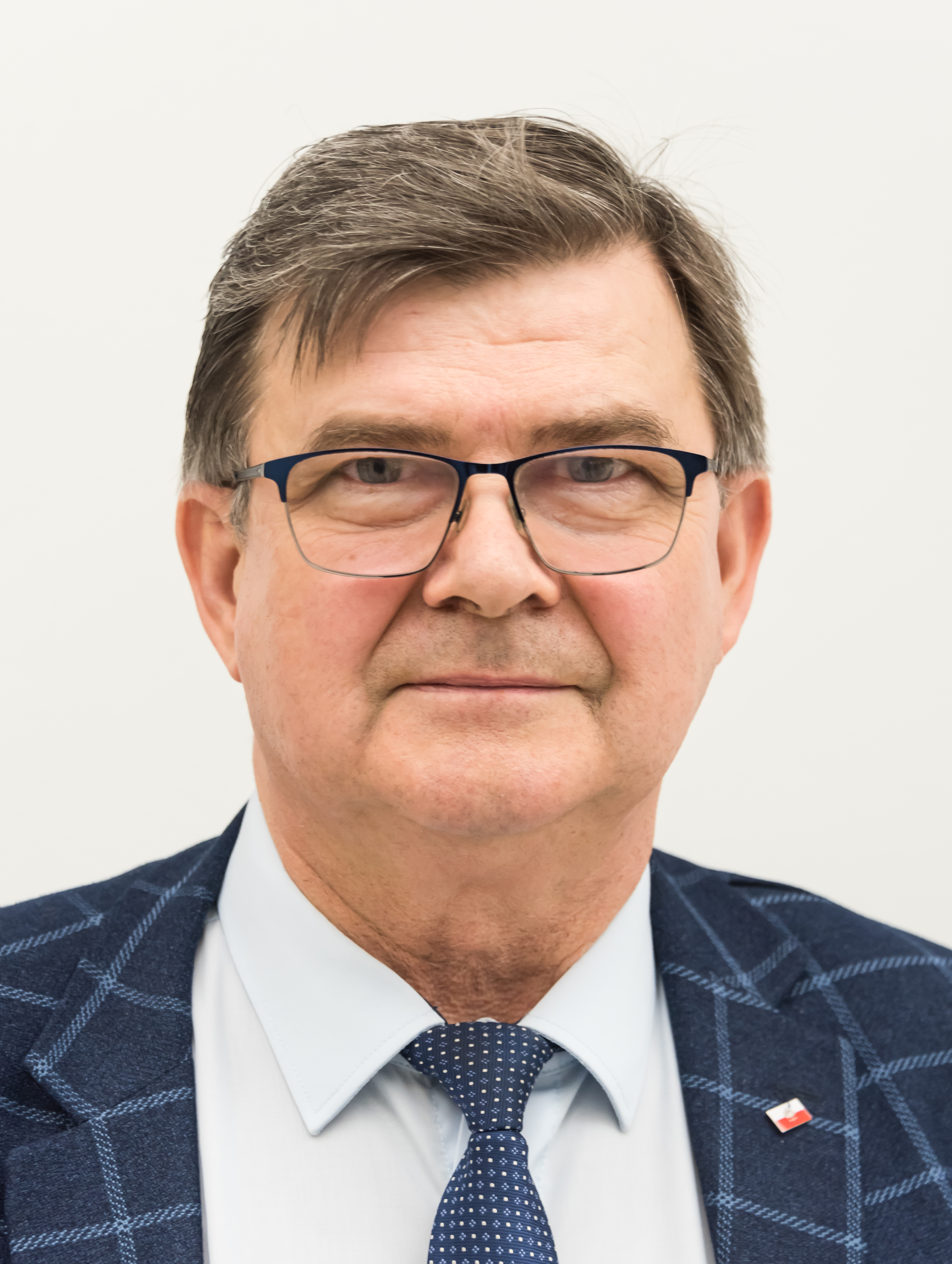

Member of Sejm
- In office 25 September 2005 – ?

Personal details
- Born: 25 March 1956 (age 70)
- Party: Law and Justice

Jerzy Marian Materna (born 25 March 1956 in Zielona Góra) is a Polish politician. He was elected to the Sejm on 25 September 2005, getting 5,371 votes in 8 Zielona Góra district as a candidate from the Law and Justice list.

== See also ==
- Members of Polish Sejm 2005-2007
