= Henryk Gołębiewski (politician) =

Polish politician (born 1942)

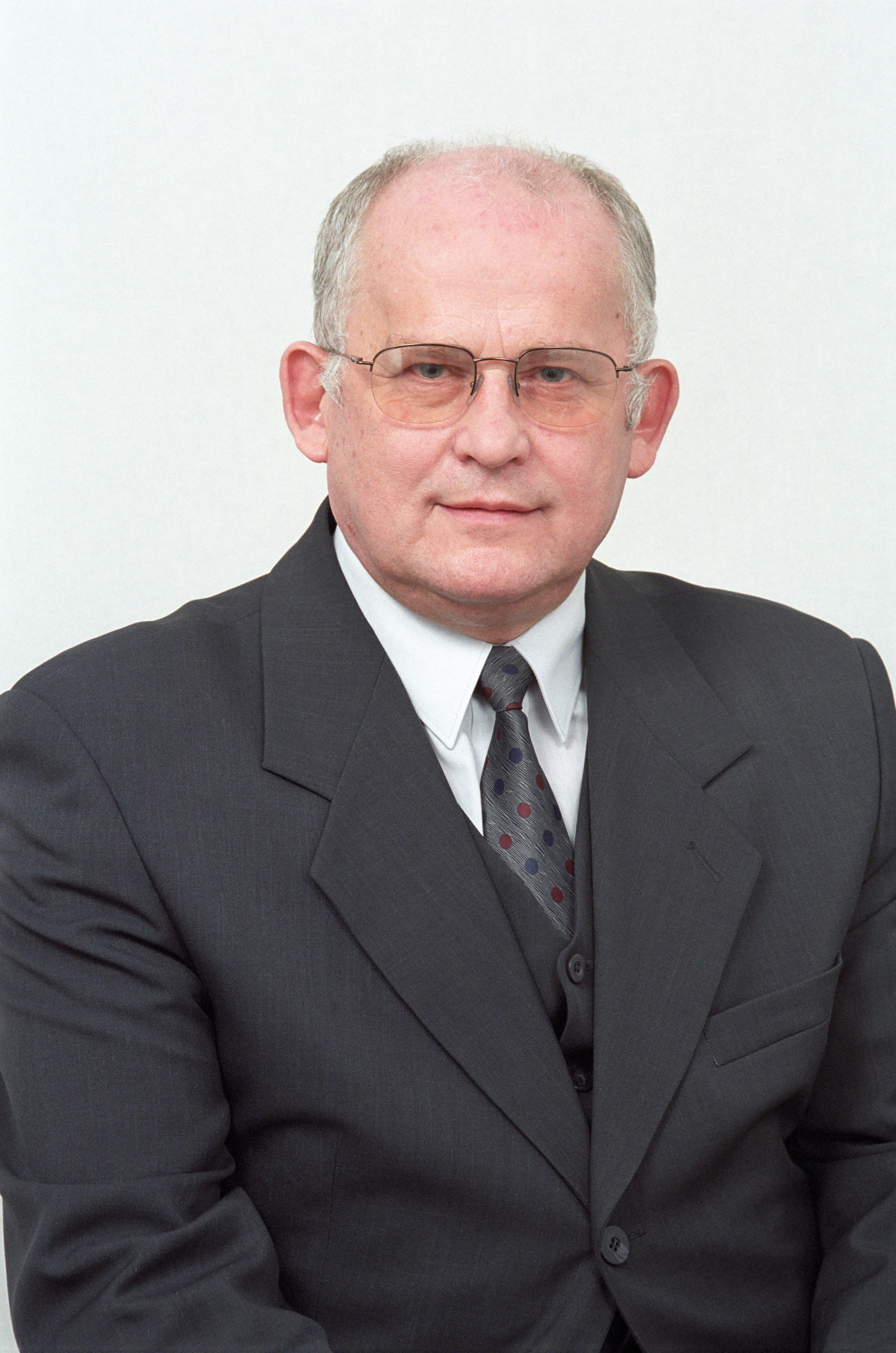

Member of the Sejm
- In office 18 October 2005 – 7 November 2011
- Constituency: 2 – Wałbrzych

Member of the Senate of Poland
- In office 20 October 2001 – 18 October 2005

Personal details
- Born: 22 July 1942 (age 83)
- Party: Democratic Left Alliance

Henryk Gołębiewski (born 22 July 1942 in Lubowidz) is a Polish politician. He was elected to Sejm on 25 September 2005, getting 8454 votes in 2 Wałbrzych district as a candidate from the Democratic Left Alliance list.

He was also a member of Senate 2001-2005.

From 2003 to 2004, marshal of the Lower Silesian Voivodeship.

== See also ==
- Members of Polish Sejm 2005-2007
