= Gmina Mircze =

Gmina Mircze Mircze Commune
- Gmina
- Coat of arms
- Interactive map of Gmina Mircze
- Coordinates (Mircze): 50°39′10″N 23°54′17″E
- Country: Poland
- Voivodeship: Lublin
- County: Hrubieszów
- Seat: Mircze

Area
  - Total: 233.82 km^{2} (90.28 sq mi)

Population (2013)
  - Total: 7,579
  - Density: 32.41/km^{2} (83.95/sq mi)
- Website: http://mircze.pl

Gmina Mircze is a rural gmina (administrative district) in Hrubieszów County, Lublin Voivodeship, in eastern Poland, on the border with Ukraine. Its seat is the village of Mircze, which lies approximately 19 kilometres (12 mi) south of Hrubieszów and 115 km (71 mi) south-east of the regional capital Lublin.

The gmina covers an area of 233.82 square kilometres (90.3 sq mi), and as of 2006 its total population is 7,780 (7,579 in 2013).
