= List of Civic Platform politicians =

A list of notable Polish politicians of the Civic Platform Party (Polish: Platforma Obywatelska).

== A ==
- Łukasz Abgarowicz
- Paweł Adamowicz
- Robert Ambroziewicz
- Paweł Arndt
- Urszula Augustyn
- Tadeusz Aziewicz

== B ==
- Aleksandra Banasiak
- Radosław Baran
- Józef Berger
- Jan Krzysztof Bielecki
- Marek Biernacki
- Mateusz Bochenek
- Krystyna Bochenek
- Bogdan Bojko
- Michał Boni
- Bogdan Borusewicz
- Krzysztof Brejza
- Rafał Bruski
- Beata Bublewicz
- Jerzy Budnik
- Bożenna Bukiewicz
- Mirosław Bulzacki
- Jerzy Buzek

== C ==
- Piotr Całbecki
- Zbigniew Chlebowski
- Stanisław Chmielewski
- Zdzisław Chmielewski
- Janusz Chwierut
- Piotr Cybulski
- Andrzej Czerwiński
- Tomasz Czubak
- Andrzej Czuma

== D ==
- Grzegorz Dolniak
- Ludwik Dorn
- Mirosław Drzewiecki
- Jarosław Duda
- Waldy Dzikowski
- Janusz Dzięcioł

== F ==
- Joanna Fabisiak
- Jerzy Fedorowicz
- Czesław Fiedorowicz

== G ==
- Urszula Gacek
- Krzysztof Gadowski
- Aleksandra Gajewska (born 1971)
- Aleksandra Gajewska (born 1989)
- Stanisław Gawłowski
- Andrzej Gałażewski
- Elżbieta Gelert
- Zyta Gilowska
- John Godson
- Stanisław Gorczyca
- Jarosław Gowin
- Andrzej Maria Gołaś
- Cezary Grabarczyk
- Aleksander Grad
- Paweł Graś
- Hanna Gronkiewicz-Waltz
- Maciej Grubski
- Rafał Grupiński
- Krzysztof Grzegorek
- Andrzej Gut-Mostowy
- Tomasz Głogowski

== H ==
- Aleksander Hall
- Małgorzata Handzlik
- Jolanta Hibner
- Krzysztof Hołowczyc
- Danuta Hübner

== I ==
- Stanisław Iwan

== J ==
- Tadeusz Jarmuziewicz
- Patryk Jaskulski
- Danuta Jazłowiecka
- Stanisław Jałowiecki
- Michał Joachimowski
- Sidonia Jędrzejewska

== K ==
- Filip Kaczmarek
- Krzysztof Kamiński
- Sebastian Karpiniuk
- Włodzimierz Karpiński
- Małgorzata Kidawa-Błońska
- Leon Kieres
- Kazimierz Kleina
- Bogdan Klich
- Józef Klim
- Ryszard Knosala
- Magdalena Kochan
- Lena Kolarska-Bobińska
- Bronisław Komorowski
- Ewa Kopacz
- Domicela Kopaczewska
- Tadeusz Kopeć
- Leszek Korzeniowski
- Roman Kosecki
- Jerzy Kozdroń
- Mirosław Koźlakiewicz
- Stanisław Kracik
- Jacek Krupa
- Marian Krzaklewski
- Barbara Kudrycka
- Tomasz Kulesza
- Kazimierz Kutz
- Krzysztof Kwiatkowski

== L ==
- Stanisław Lamczyk
- Tomasz Lenz
- Janusz Lewandowski
- Dariusz Lipiński
- Jacek Lipiński
- Krzysztof Lisek
- Arkadiusz Litwiński
- Roman Ludwiczuk
- Alojzy Lysko

== M ==
- Edward Maniura
- Andrzej Markowiak
- Tadeusz Maćkała
- Beata Małecka-Libera
- Jerzy Miller
- Konstanty Miodowicz
- Tomasz Misiak
- Izabela Mrzygłocka
- Joanna Mucha
- Rafał Muchacki
- Antoni Mężydło
- Aldona Młyńczak

== N ==
- Stefan Niesiołowski
- Sławomir Nitras
- Sławomir Nowak

== O ==
- Stanisława Okularczyk
- Jan Olbrycht
- Alicja Olechowska
- Andrzej Olechowski
- Paweł Olszewski

== P ==
- Zbigniew Pacelt
- Maria Pasło-Wiśniewska
- Andrzej Person
- Antoni Piechniczek
- Sławomir Piechota
- Elżbieta Pierzchała
- Krzysztof Piesiewicz
- Danuta Pietraszewska
- Teresa Piotrowska
- Paweł Piskorski
- Julia Pitera
- Kazimierz Plocke
- Marek Plura
- Jacek Protasiewicz
- Maciej Płażyński

== R ==
- Damian Raczkowski
- Elżbieta Radziszewska
- Józef Ramlau
- Ireneusz Raś
- Marek Rocki
- Małgorzata Rohde
- Jan Rokita
- Nelli Rokita
- Halina Rozpondek
- Jan Rulewski
- Jakub Rutnicki
- Arkadiusz Rybicki
- Sławomir Rybicki
- Zbigniew Rynasiewicz
- Jan Rzymełka

== S ==
- Leszek Samborski
- Jacek Saryusz-Wolski
- Beata Sawicka
- Wojciech Saługa
- Grzegorz Schetyna
- Mirosław Sekuła
- Władysław Sidorowicz
- Henryk Siedlaczek
- Tomasz Siemoniak
- Radosław Sikorski
- Krystyna Skowrońska
- Joanna Skrzydlewska
- Andrzej Smirnow
- Robert Smoktunowicz
- Bogusław Sonik
- Andrzej Sośnierz
- Lidia Staroń
- Michał Stuligrosz
- Brunon Synak
- Waldemar Szadny
- Michał Szczerba
- Tomasz Szczypiński
- Adam Szejnfeld
- Andrzej Szewiński
- Grzegorz Sztolcman
- Jakub Szulc
- Krystyna Szumilas
- Krzysztof Szyga

== T ==
- Róża Thun
- Tomasz Tomczykiewicz
- Tadeusz Truskolaski
- Donald Tusk
- Robert Tyszkiewicz

== U ==
- Jarosław Urbaniak
- Aleksandra Uznańska-Wiśniewska

== W ==
- Piotr Wach
- Jarosław Wałęsa
- Wojciech Wilk
- Ewa Więckowska
- Jacek Wojciechowicz
- Ewa Wolak
- Marek Woźniak
- Eugeniusz Wycisło
- Jan Wyrowiński
- Marek Wójcik

== Z ==
- Jadwiga Zakrzewska
- Zbigniew Zaleski
- Paweł Zalewski
- Krzysztof Zaremba
- Artur Zasada
- Hanna Zdanowska
- Bogdan Zdrojewski
- Anna Zielińska-Głębocka
- Wojciech Ziemniak
- Tadeusz Zwiefka

== Ć ==
- Zbigniew Ćwiąkalski

== Ł ==
- Elżbieta Łukacijewska

== Ś ==
- Iwona Śledzińska-Katarasińska
- Paweł Śpiewak
- Maciej Świątkowski

== Ż ==
- Stanisław Żmijan
