= List of Sejm members (2011–2015) =

7th term of the Sejm

The seventh term of the Government of the Republic of Poland is the term of the Government that ran from 8 November 2011 to 11 November 2015.

== Officers ==
| | Name | Party | Notes |
|---|---|---|---|
| Senior Marshal | Józef Zych | Polish People's Party | |
| Marshal | Ewa Kopacz | Civic Platform | Served from 8 November 2011 to 22 September 2014 |
| Marshal | Radosław Sikorski | Civic Platform | Served from 24 September 2014 to 23 June 2015 |
| Marshal | Małgorzata Kidawa-Błońska | Civic Platform | Served from 25 June 2015 to 11 November 2015 |
| Deputy Marshals | Cezary Grabarczyk | Civic Platform | |
| Deputy Marshals | Eugeniusz Grzeszczak | Polish People's Party | |
| Deputy Marshals | Marek Kuchciński | Law and Justice | |
| Deputy Marshals | Wanda Nowicka | Non-attached member | |
| Deputy Marshals | Jerzy Wenderlich | Democratic Left Alliance | |
| Deputy Marshals | Elżbieta Radziszewska | Civic Platform | |

== Members of Sejm ==
Civic Platform
| Elżbieta Achinger; Tadeusz Arkit; Bożena Kamińska; Grzegorz Karpiński; Włodzimierz Karpiński; Jan Kaźmierczak; Małgorzata Kidawa-Błońska; Marcin Kierwiński; Agnieszka Pomaska; Jadwiga Zakrzewska; Renata Zaremba; Ryszard Zawadzki; Anna Nemś; Maciej Zieliński; Bożenna Bukiewicz; Marek Poręba; Damian Raczkowski; Elżbieta Radziszewska; Grzegorz Raniewicz; Ireneusz Raś; Halina Rozpondek; Beata Rusinowska; Dorota Rutkowska; Jakub Rutnicki; Marek Rząsa; Jan Rzymełka; Joanna Kluzik-Rostkowska; Krystyna Kłosin; Robert Kropiwnicki; Elżbieta Królikowska-Kińska; Przemysław Krysztofiak; Marek Krząkała; Cezary Kucharski; Jan Kulas; Tomasz Kulesza; Stanisław Lamczyk; Józef Lassota; Tomasz Lenz; Izabela Leszczyna; Arkadiusz Litwiński; Magdalena Kochan; Brygida Kolenda-Łabuś; Agnieszka Kołacz-Leszczyńska; Bartosz Arłukowicz; Paweł Arndt; Urszula Augustyn; Tadeusz Aziewicz; Marek Biernacki; Andrzej Biernat; Leszek Blanik | Joanna Bobowska; Jerzy Borowczak; Krzysztof Brejza; Jacek Brzezinka; Beata Bublewicz; Borys Budka; Cezary Grabarczyk; Teresa Świło; Jerzy Fedorowicz; Piotr Tomański; Arkady Fiedler; Irena Tomaszak-Zesiuk; Jan Tomaszewski; Jacek Tomczak; Cezary Tomczyk; Tomasz Tomczykiewicz; Aleksandra Trybuś-Cieślar; Łukasz Tusk; Robert Tyszkiewicz; Piotr van der Coghen; Jacek Rostowski; Mariusz Grad; Rafał Grupiński; Andrzej Gut-Mostowy; Iwona Guzowska; Andrzej Halicki; Katarzyna Hall; Agnieszka Hanajczyk; Bożena Henczyca; Marek Hok; Teresa Hoppe; Marek Łapiński; Zofia Ławrynowicz; Robert Maciaszek; Beata Małecka-Libera; Jagna Marczułajtis-Walczak; Katarzyna Matusik-Lipiec; Antoni Mężydło; Rajmund Miller; Aldona Młyńczak; Czesław Mroczek; Izabela Katarzyna Mrzygłocka; Joanna Mucha; Killion Munyama; Tadeusz Naguszewski; Andrzej Czerwiński; Renata Butryn; Jarosław Charłampowicz; Stanisław Chmielewski | Grzegorz Schetyna; Mariusz Witczak; Norbert Wojnarowski; Ewa Wolak; Małgorzata Woźniak; Marek Wójcik; Wojciech Ziemniak; Stanisław Żmijan; Ewa Żmuda-Trzebiatowska; Henryk Siedlaczek; Radosław Sikorski; Krystyna Skowrońska; Bożena Sławiak; Waldemar Sługocki; Katarzyna Stachowicz; Michał Stuligrosz; Janusz Cichoń; Dorota Niedziela; Małgorzata Niemczyk; Stefan Niesiołowski; Tomasz Piotr Nowak; Mirosława Nykiel; Marzena Okła-Drewnowicz; Janina Okrągły; Alicja Olechowska; Paweł Olszewski; Maciej Orzechowski; Andrzej Orzechowski; Konstanty Oświęcimski; Grażyna Ciemniak; Robert Jagła; Renata Janik; Maria Janyska; Tadeusz Jarmuziewicz; Michał Jaros; Leszek Jastrzębski; Roman Kaczor; Piotr Cieśliński; Marian Cycoń; Barbara Czaplicka; Czesław Czechyra; Zofia Czernow; Ewa Czeszejko-Sochacka; Alicja Dąbrowska; Ewa Drozd; Artur Dunin; Zenon Durka; Janusz Dzięcioł; Krystyna Sibińska | Robert Wardzała; Monika Wielichowska; Zbigniew Pacelt; Sławomir Neumann; Stanisław Huskowski; Wiesław Suchowiejko; Paweł Suski; Michał Szczerba; Grzegorz Sztolcman; Krystyna Szumilas; Bożena Szydłowska; Tomasz Szymański; Iwona Śledzińska-Katarasińska; Marcin Święcicki; Witold Pahl; Paweł Papke; Małgorzata Pępek; Sławomir Jan Piechota; Elżbieta Pierzchała; Danuta Pietraszewska; Lucjan Pietrzczyk; Jarosław Pięta; Teresa Piotrowska; Kazimierz Plocke; Mirosław Pluta; Ewa Kołodziej; Zbigniew Konwiński; Ewa Kopacz; Domicela Kopaczewska; Leszek Korzeniowski; Roman Kosecki; Sławomir Kowalski; Jacek Kozaczyński; Jerzy Kozdroń; Iwona Kozłowska; Mirosław Koźlakiewicz; Ligia Krajewska; Waldy Dzikowski; Joanna Fabisiak |
Prawo i Sprawiedliwość
| Adam Abramowicz; Andrzej Adamczyk; Piotr Babinetz; Barbara Bartuś; Jacek Bogucki; Joachim Brudziński; Ryszard Terlecki; Grzegorz Tobiszowski; Piotr Ćwik; Kazimierz Smoliński; Sławomir Zawiślak; Łukasz Zbonikowski; Anna Sobecka; Czesław Sobierajski; Krzysztof Sońta; Lech Sprawka; Leszek Dobrzyński; Szymon Giżyński; Krzysztof Głuchowski; Wiesław Janczyk; Grzegorz Janik; Mariusz Kamiński; Sławomir Kłosowski; Piotr Marek Król; Elżbieta Kruk; Marek Kuchciński; Maciej Małecki; Gabriela Masłowska; Marcin Mastalerek; Jerzy Materna; Stanisław Pięta; Dariusz Piontkowski; Stanisław Piotrowicz; Jerzy Polaczek | Waldemar Andzel; Dorota Arciszewska-Mielewczyk; Dariusz Bąk; Włodzimierz Bernacki; Barbara Bubula; Jan Warzecha; Witold Waszczykowski; Zbigniew Chmielowiec; Zbigniew Dolata; Jarosław Stawiarski; Stefan Strzałkowski; Jarosław Zieliński; Maria Zuba; Marek Suski; Paweł Szałamacha; Wojciech Szarama; Marcin Duszek; Kazimierz Gołojuch; Małgorzata Gosiewska; Marek Kwitek; Tomasz Latos; Krzysztof Lipiec; Wojciech Jasiński; Andrzej Jaworski; Lech Kołakowski; Robert Kołakowski; Grzegorz Matusiak; Marek Matuszewski; Beata Mazurek; Krzysztof Michałkiewicz; Marek Polak; Piotr Polak; Piotr Pyzik; Elżbieta Rafalska | Jan Ardanowski; Iwona Arent; Andrzej Bętkowski; Piotr Babiarz; Daniela Chrapkiewicz; Przemysław Czarnecki; Michał Dworczyk; Elżbieta Witek; Michał Wojtkiewicz; Jan Dziedziczak; Jan Szyszko; Janusz Śniadek; Jacek Świat; Krzysztof Tchórzewski; Robert Telus; Wojciech Zubowski; Jerzy Żyżyński; Artur Górski; Czesław Hoc; Mariusz Jędrysek; Krzysztof Jurgiel; Henryk Kowalczyk; Bartosz Kownacki; Adam Lipiński; Marek Łatas; Marzena Machałek; Kazimierz Moskal; Piotr Naimski; Maria Nowak; Halina Olendzka; Urszula Rusecka; Bogdan Rzońca; Jacek Sasin; Jerzy Sądel | Marek Ast; Zbigniew Babalski; Mariusz Błaszczak; Antoni Błądek; Witold Czarnecki; Arkadiusz Czartoryski; Tadeusz Dziuba; Grzegorz Woźniak; Anna Zalewska; Jacek Falfus; Jolanta Szczypińska; Andrzej Szlachta; Jerzy Szmit; Stanisław Szwed; Beata Szydło; Józefina Hrynkiewicz; Michał Jach; Filip Kaczyński; Jarosław Kaczyński; Maks Kraczkowski; Leonard Krasulski; Antoni Macierewicz; Krzysztof Maciejewski; Ewa Malik; Marek Opioła; Jacek Osuch; Anna Paluch; Krystyna Pawłowicz; Grzegorz Schreiber; Dariusz Seliga; Jarosław Sellin; Andrzej Smirnow |
Polish People's Party
| Bartłomiej Bodio; Edmund Borawski; Piotr Walkowski; Piotr Zgorzelski; Józef Zych; Krzysztof Borkowski; Artur Bramora; Jan Bury; Artur Dębski; Dariusz Dziadzio; Romuald Garczewski | John Godson; Marek Gos; Eugeniusz Grzeszczak; Henryk Smolarz; Zbigniew Sosnowski; Stanisław Żelichowski; Franciszek Stefaniuk; Stanisław Kalemba; Mieczysław Kasprzak; Eugeniusz Kłopotek; Henryk Kmiecik | Jan Łopata; Tomasz Makowski; Mirosław Maliszewski; Elżbieta Nawrocka; Krystyna Ozga; Michał Pacholski; Urszula Pasławska; Mirosław Pawlak; Waldemar Pawlak; Janusz Piechociński; Andrzej Sztorc | Halina Szymiec-Raczyńska; Genowefa Tokarska; Józef Racki; Paweł Sajak; Marek Sawicki |
Democratic Left Alliance
| Romuald Ajchler; Leszek Aleksandrzak; Marek Balt; Czesław Gluza; Artur Górczyński; Tadeusz Iwiński; Artur Ostrowski; Stanisława Prządka; Małgorzata Sekuła-Szmajdzińska | Maciej Banaszak; Anna Bańkowska; Jan Cedzyński; Dariusz Joński; Tomasz Kamiński; Adam Kępiński; Aleksander Sosna; Marek Stolarski; Tadeusz Tomaszewski | Piotr Chmielowski; Jacek Czerniak; Eugeniusz Czykwin; Witold Klepacz; Krzysztof Kłosowski; Zbigniew Matuszczak; Jerzy Wenderlich; Bogusław Wontor; Stanisław Wziątek | Marek Domaracki; Wincenty Elsner; Tomasz Garbowski; Leszek Miller; Marek Niedbała; Cezary Olejniczak; Zbyszek Zaborowski; Ryszard Zbrzyzny |
United Poland
| Andrzej Dąbrowski; Andrzej Dera; Mieczysław Golba; Tadeusz Woźniak | Jarosław Gowin; Patryk Jaki; Andrzej Kania; Kazimierz Ziobro | Beata Kempa; Arkadiusz Mularczyk; Krzysztof Popiołek; Jacek Żalek | Józef Rojek; Andrzej Romanek; Jan Ziobro; Edward Siarka |
Your Movement
| Piotr Bauć; Jerzy Borkowski; Maciej Wydrzyński | Andrzej Dołecki; Michał Kabaciński; Adam Rybakowicz | Jacek Kwiatkowski; Andrzej Lewandowski; Zofia Popiołek | Małgorzata Marcinkiewicz; Maciej Mroczek |
White - Red
| Jacek Najder | Sławomir Kopyciński | Grzegorz Napieralski | Andrzej Rozenek |
Unaffiliated
| Jerzy Budnik; Ludwik Dorn; Adam Hofman; Jarosław Jagiełło; Andrzej Piątak; Marek Poznański; Ryszard Galla | Łukasz Gibała; Ryszard Kalisz; Mariusz Antoni Kamiński; Adam Rogacki; Armand Ryfiński; Zbigniew Girzyński; Tomasz Górski | Roman Kotliński; Łukasz Krupa; Lidia Staroń; Piotr Szeliga; Anna Grodzka; Jarosław Gromadzki; Wanda Nowicka | Wojciech Penkalski; Przemysław Wipler; Marzena Wróbel; Jerzy Ziętek |

== See also ==
- 2011 Polish parliamentary election
- List of Polish senators (2011–15)
- List of Sejm members (2007–11) - former term
