= Banasiak =

Banasiak is a gender-neutral Polish surname that may refer to

- Adam Banasiak (born 1989), Polish football player
- Aleksandra Banasiak (born 1935), Polish nurse
- Aude Banasiak (born 1975), French football midfielder
- Justyna Banasiak (born 1986), Polish group rhythmic gymnast
- Mark Banasiak, Australian politician
- Piotr Banasiak (born 1987), Polish football player
