= Zmuda (surname) =

Zmuda or Żmuda is a surname. Notable people with the surname include:

- Bob Zmuda (born 1949), American writer
- Ewa Żmuda-Trzebiatowska (born 1956), Polish politician
- Gene Zmuda (born 1958), American jurist
- Lidia Chmielnicka-Żmuda (1939–2002), Polish volleyball player
- Marta Żmuda Trzebiatowska (born 1984), Polish actress
- Władysław Jan Żmuda (born 1939), Polish footballer
- Władysław Antoni Żmuda (born 1954), Polish footballer

== See also ==
- Smuda
