= Olejniczak =

Olejniczak is a Polish surname, it may refer to:

- Cezary Olejniczak (born 1972), Polish politician
- Dawid Olejniczak (born 1983), Polish tennis player
- Dominic Olejniczak (1908–1989), American mayor
- Janusz Olejniczak (1952–2024), Polish pianist and actor
- Michał Olejniczak (born 2001), Polish handball player
- Stan Olejniczak (1912–1979), American football player
- Wojciech Olejniczak (born 1974), Polish politician
