= Korzeniowski =

Korzeniowski (feminine: Korzeniowska; plural: Korzeniowscy) is a Polish surname. It may refer to:

- Joseph Conrad (1857–1924), born Józef Teodor Konrad Korzeniowski, Polish-British novelist
- Abel Korzeniowski (born 1972), Polish composer
- Apollo Korzeniowski (1820–1869), Polish poet
- Bonnie Korzeniowski (1941–2019), Canadian politician
- Leszek Korzeniowski (born 1955), Polish politician
- Paweł Korzeniowski (born 1985), Polish swimmer
- Robert Korzeniowski (born 1968), Polish racewalker
- Sylwia Korzeniowska (born 1980), Polish-French racewalker
