= Miodowicz =

Miodowicz is a Polish surname. Notable people with the surname include:

- Alfred Miodowicz (1929–2021), Polish politician and trade union activist
- Konstanty Miodowicz (1951–2013), Polish politician
