= Pietraszewski =

Pietraszewski, feminine: Pietraszewska is a Polish surname. The Russified variant is Petrashevsky. It may be derived either from place names Pietraszowa, Pietrasze, etc., of from the given name Pietrasz, a diminutive of "Peter". Notable people with the surname include:

- Danuta Pietraszewska (born 1947), Polish politician
- Laurent Pietraszewski, French politician
- Mikhail Petrashevsky (1821–1866), Russian revolutionary and Utopian theorist
