= Chmielewski =

Chmielewski (Polish pronunciation: [xmjɛˈlɛfski]; feminine: Chmielewska, plural: Chmielewscy) is a Polish surname meaning "one from the place of the hops". In other Slavic languages it may be transliterated as Khmelevsky, Khmelevskiy or Hmelevsky (masculine). The feminine form is Khmelevska or Hmelevska in Ukrainian and Khmelevskaya or Hmelevskaya in Russian. Notable people with the surname include:

- Aron Chmielewski (born 1991), Polish ice hockey player
- Bill Chmielewski (born 1941), American basketball player
- Florian Chmielewski (1927–2024), American politician
- Henryk Chmielewski (boxer) (1914–1998), Polish boxer
- Henryk Chmielewski (comics) (1923–2021), Polish comic book author
- Joanna Chmielewska (1932–2013), Polish writer
- Karl Chmielewski (1903–1991), German Nazi SS concentration camp commandant
- Krzysztof Chmielewski (born 2004), Polish swimmer
- Marina Khmelevskaya (born 1990), Uzbekistani long-distance runner
- Piotr Chmielewski (born 1970), Polish cyclist
- Stanisław Chmielewski (born 1958), Polish politician
- Vasiliy Khmelevskiy (1948–2002), Soviet hammer thrower
- Wiesław Chmielewski (born 1957), Polish modern pentathlete
- Wojciech Chmielewski (born 1995), Polish luger
- Zdzisław Chmielewski (born 1942), Polish historian
- Zygmunt Chmielewski (1894–1978), Polish actor

== See also ==
- Chmielowski, Polish surname
