= Smuda =

Smuda is a surname. Notable people with this surname include:

- Franciszek Smuda (born 1948), Polish football coach
- Karl-Heinz Smuda (born 1961), German writer
- Sigrid Smuda (born 1960), German speed skater

== See also ==
- Zmuda (surname)
