= Hanna Zdanowska =

Polish politician (born 1959)

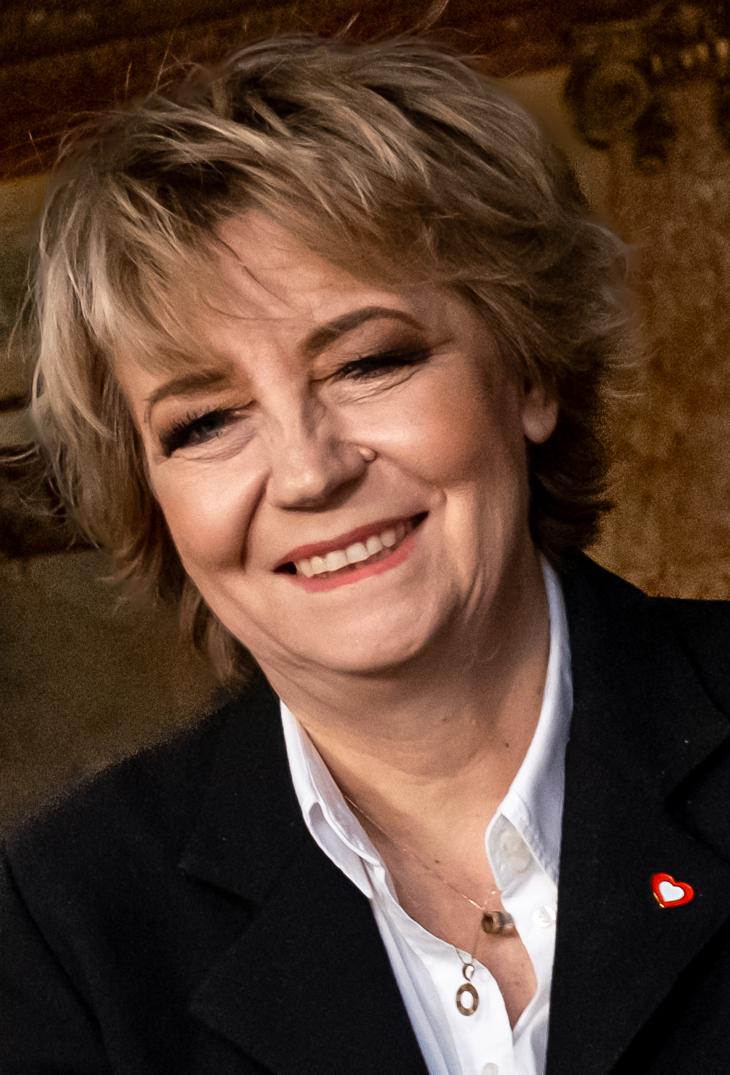
- Zdanowska in 2024

Mayor of Łódź
- Incumbent
- Assumed office 13 December 2010
- Preceded by: Paweł Paczkowski

Personal details
- Born: 29 March 1959 (age 67) Łódź, Poland
- Party: Civic Coalition
- Other political affiliations: supported by The Left & The Greens
- Education: Łódź University of Technology
- Occupation: Politician

Hanna Elżbieta Zdanowska (born 29 March 1959) is a Polish politician. Zdanowska is a member of the Civic Platform and the current city mayor of Łódź since 13 December 2010.

== Education ==
Hanna Zdanowska graduated from Lodz University of Technology. She studied engineering.

== Private life ==
Hanna Zdanowska was married, and divorced her husband in 1997. She has a son Robert, an artist, who graduated from the Academy of Fine Arts in Lodz. Also, since 1997, she is in an informal relationship with Włodzimierz G., an entrepreneur.

== See also ==
- List of mayors of Łódź
- List of first women mayors
- List of Sejm members (2007–2011)
- List of Civic Platform politicians

Political offices
Preceded by Paweł Paczkowski	Mayor of Łódź; 2010-	Succeeded by Incumbent
