= Marek Hok =

Polish politician (born 1953)

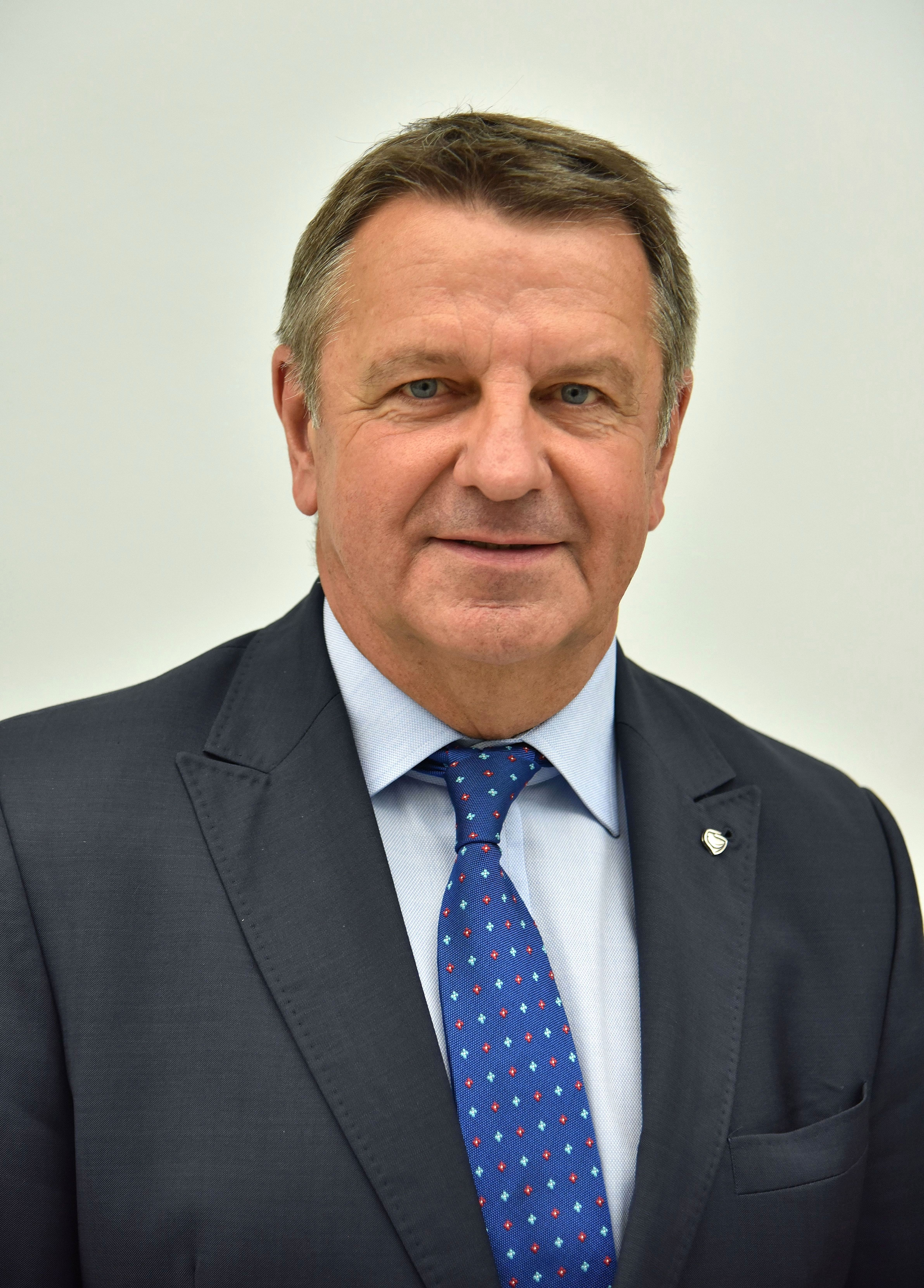
- Born: June 15, 1953 (age 73); Koszalin
- Education: Pomeranian Medical University in Szczecin
- Occupations: Politician, doctor
- Office: Member of the Sejm for the VII, VIII, IX, and X terms (since 2011)
- Political party: Civic Platform

Marek Tomasz Hok (born June 15, 1953, in Koszalin) is a Polish politician, gynecologist, and local government official. From 2006 to 2011, he was a member of the executive board of the West Pomeranian Voivodeship, and since 2011, he has been a member of the Sejm for the VII, VIII, IX, and X terms.

Hok graduated from the Pomeranian Medical University in Szczecin and completed postgraduate studies in healthcare management. He also pursued a doctorate at the Medical University of Łódź and obtained a second-degree specialization in gynecology and obstetrics. Since the mid-1980s, he has been associated with the hospital in Kołobrzeg, where he was appointed deputy director for medical treatment in 2002. He is a member of various sports and non-governmental organizations, including serving as the president of the local branch of the Polish Red Cross and the president of the West Pomeranian Cycling Association.

Hok became involved with the Civic Platform party, serving as the vice-chairman of regional structures and, in 2010, as the chairman of the party in the Kołobrzeg County.

From 1998 to 2006, he served two terms as a councilor in the Kołobrzeg city council. In the 2006 and 2010 local elections, he was elected as a councilor of the West Pomeranian Voivodeship assembly. In 2006, he was appointed a member of the executive board, serving under Norbert Obrycki, and remained in office until 2011 under subsequent marshals Władysław Husejko and Olgierd Geblewicz.

In the 2011 parliamentary elections, Hok was elected to the Sejm as a candidate from the Civic Platform list.

In the 2015 elections, he successfully ran for re-election, receiving 17,647 votes. In the VIII term of the Sejm, he was a member of the Health Committee and the Rules, Deputies' Affairs, and Parliamentary Immunity Committee.

In the 2019 and 2023 elections, he was re-elected as a member of the Sejm, running on behalf of the Civic Coalition.
