= Przemysław Czarnecki =

Polish politician

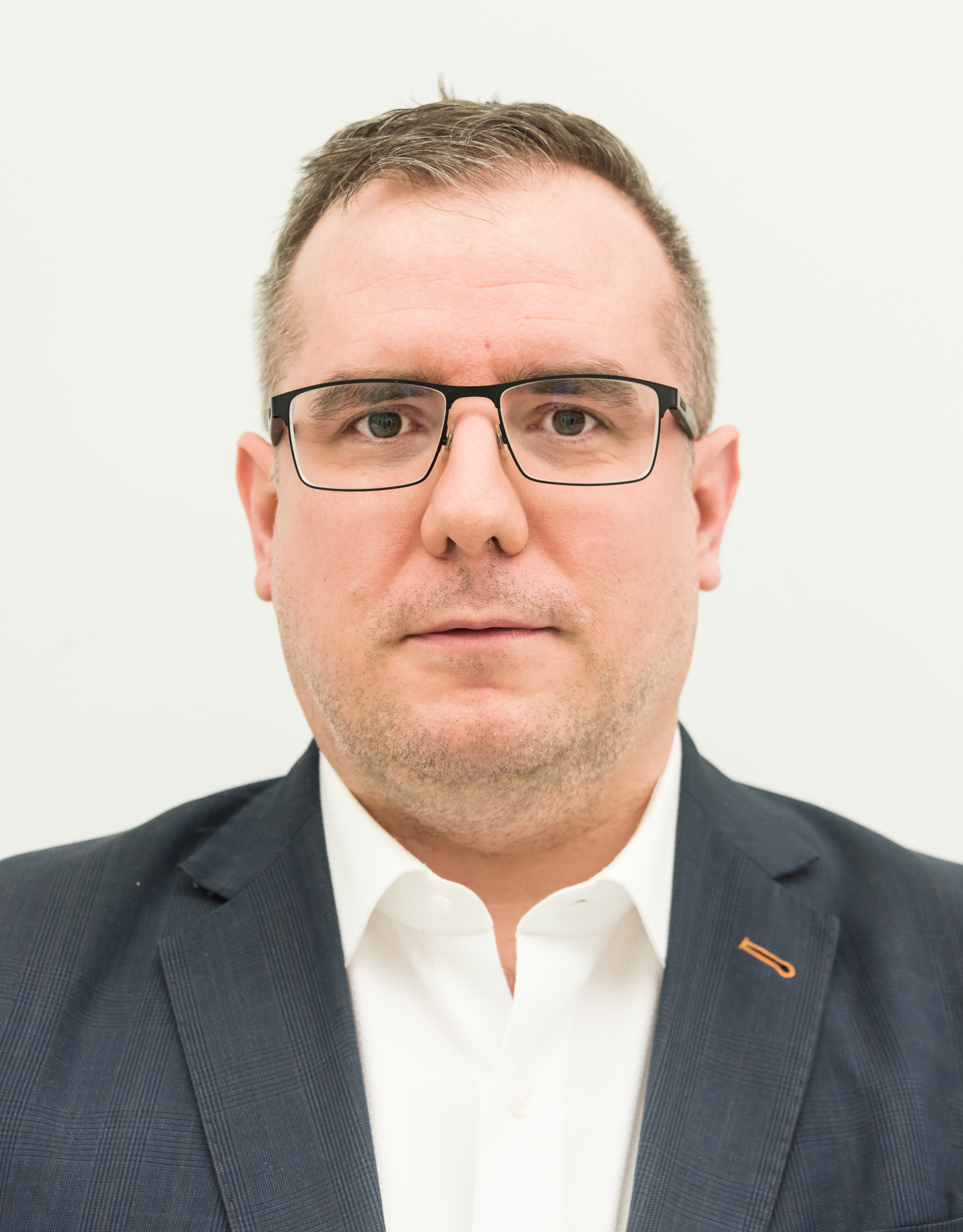
- Przemysław Czarnecki (2023)
- Born: 12 September 1983 (age 42); Wrocław, Poland
- Occupation: politician
- Office: Member of the Sejm (VII, VIII, and IX terms)
- Political party: Law and Justice

Przemysław Maksymilian Czarnecki (born 12 September 1983) is a Polish politician, member of the Sejm during its VII, VIII, and IX terms.

== Early life and education ==
He graduated from the XXXVIII Stanisław Kostka Potocki High School in Warsaw (2003). He studied law at the University of Wrocław. Czarnecki worked in manual labor in the UK, later as a security analyst and in the parliamentary club of Law and Justice. He also interned in the legal department of PKO BP. From 2013 to 2014, he was unemployed.

== Political career ==
In 2010, he unsuccessfully ran for the Wrocław City Council from the Law and Justice ticket. In the 2011 elections, he also unsuccessfully ran for the Sejm from the Wrocław constituency, receiving 6,222 votes. He became a deputy on 5 June 2014, replacing Dawid Jackiewicz. In 2015, he joined the supervisory board of the Wrocław Sports Association.

In the 2015 elections, he successfully ran for re-election with 9,200 votes. Czarnecki became the deputy chair of the Foreign Affairs Committee. In the 2019 elections, he retained his seat, receiving 19,413 votes. In the IX term, he was again the vice-chair of the Foreign Affairs Committee and a member of the Physical Culture, Sports, and Tourism Committee.

In the 2023 elections, he ran unsuccessfully for the Sejm's X term, receiving 9,342 votes. In the 2024 elections, he unsuccessfully ran for the Lower Silesian Voivodeship Assembly, but he took office later in 2024, replacing Grzegorz Macko.
