= Maciej Tomczykiewicz =

Polish politician (born 1988)

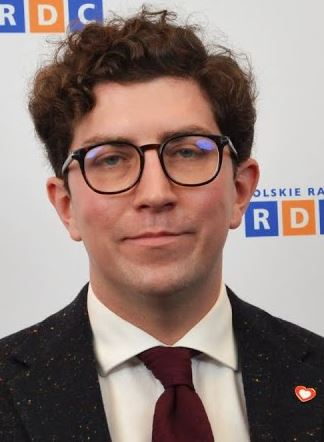
- Tomczykiewicz in 2025

Member of the Sejm
- Incumbent
- Assumed office 26 June 2024
- Preceded by: Mirosława Nykiel
- Constituency: Bielsko-Biała I

Personal details
- Born: 27 March 1988 (age 38)
- Party: Civic Coalition (since 2025)
- Other political affiliations: Civic Platform (until 2025)
- Parent: Tomasz Tomczykiewicz (father)

Maciej Tadeusz Tomczykiewicz (born 27 March 1988) is a Polish politician serving as a member of the Sejm since 2024. He is the son of Tomasz Tomczykiewicz.
