= Jarosław Wieczorek =

Polish politician

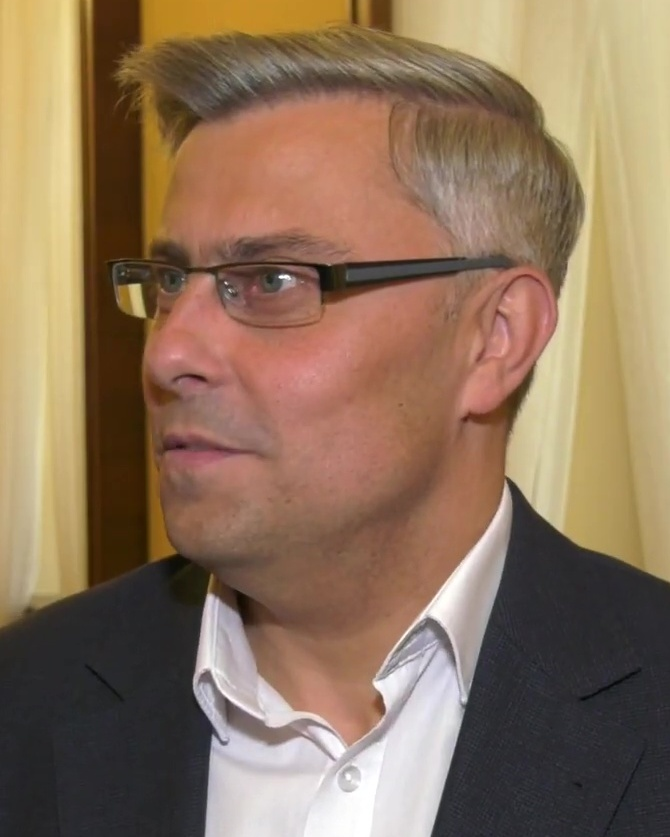

Voivode of Silesian Voivodeship
- In office 8 December 2015 – 2 November 2023
- President: Andrzej Duda
- Prime Minister: Mateusz Morawiecki
- Preceded by: Piotr Litwa
- Succeeded by: Marek Wójcik

Personal details
- Born: 30 November 1965 (age 60) Gubin, Polish People's Republic
- Citizenship: Poland
- Party: Law and Justice
- Education: University of Silesia
- Occupation: Politician, entrepreneur

Jarosław Wiesław Wieczorek (born January 27, 1981 in Gliwice) is a Polish politician, entrepreneur, and local government official, Voivode of Silesian Voivodeship from 2015 to 2023 and Member of the Sejm of the 10th term.

== Biography ==
He graduated with a degree in Political Science from the Faculty of Social Sciences at the University of Silesia. He ran his own business as part of a commercial law partnership. He became involved in politics by joining the Law and Justice party. In 2006, he was first elected as a city councilor in Gliwice. He was re-elected as a city councilor in 2010 and 2014. He was appointed to the board of the Upper Silesian Metropolitan Union. In 2014, he also ran unsuccessfully for Mayor of Gliwice.

On December 8, 2015, he assumed the position of Voivode of Silesian Voivodeship. In the 2023 elections, he was elected a member of parliament for the 10th term, receiving 23,451 votes in the Gliwice district. As a result, on November 2 of the same year, he resigned from his position as voivode. In November 2023, he was appointed chairman of the provincial board of the Law and Justice party in the Silesian Voivodeship. In 2024, he ran as a representative of the Law and Justice party in the European Parliament elections from district no. 11.
