= Ewa Kołodziej =

Polish politician and deputy

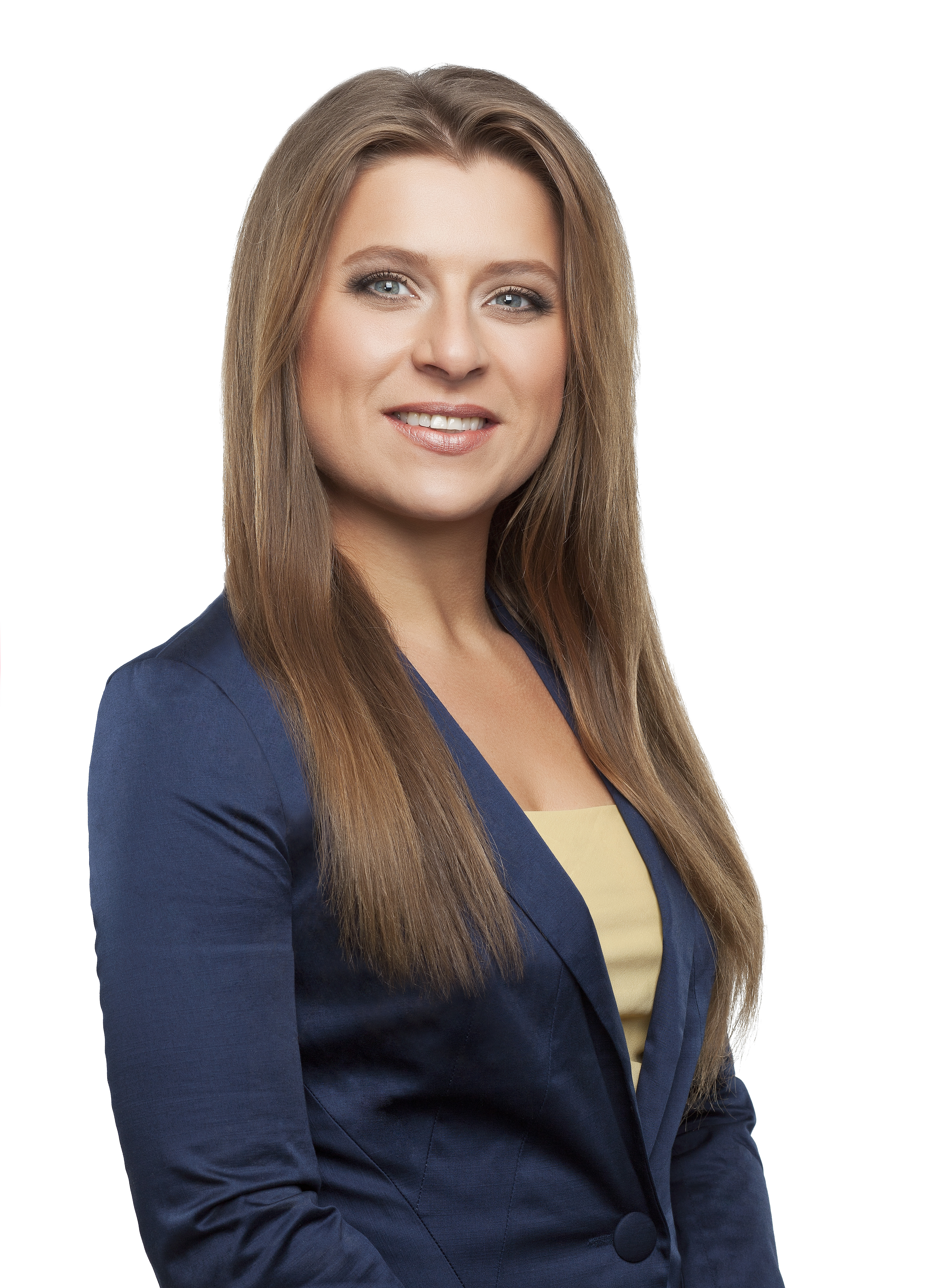

Member of the Sejm
- Incumbent
- Assumed office 8 November 2011

Personal details
- Born: 2 September 1978 (age 47) Katowice, Poland
- Party: Civic Platform

Ewa Edyta Kołodziej (born 1978) is a Polish politician. She holds a seat in the Sejm after being elected in 2011. In 2015, she was not elected, but was appointed to replace Tomasz Tomczykiewicz. In 2019, she was re-elected. She was re-elected again in 2023.
