= Chmielowski =

Chmielowski (Polish pronunciation: [xmjɛˈlɔfski]; feminine: Chmielowska, plural: Chmielowscy) is a Polish surname. Notable people with the surname include:

- Albert Chmielowski (1845–1916), Polish Catholic saint
- Benedykt Chmielowski (1700–1753), Polish priest
- Claudia Chmielowska (born 1998), Polish gymnast
- Piotr Chmielowski (1848–1904), Polish philosopher and literary historian

== See also ==
- Chmielewski, Polish surname
