= Ewa Żmuda-Trzebiatowska =

Polish politician and schoolteacher (born 1956)

- Żmuda-Trzebiatowska in 2012.

Member of the Sejm of Poland
- In office 8 November 2011 – 11 November 2015
- Constituency: No. 41

Member of the Świnoujście City Council
- In office 21 November 2010 – 27 October 2011
- Constituency: No. 3

Personal details
- Born: Ewa Ilona Pesta; 8 August 1956 (age 70) Szczecin, Poland
- Party: Civic Platform
- Children: 1
- Education: Casimir the Great University; University of Humanities and Economics in Łódź; West Pomeranian Business School in Szczecin
- Occupation: Politician, schoolteacher

Ewa Ilona Żmuda-Trzebiatowska (Polish: [ˈɛ.va iˈlɔ.na ˈʐmu.da tʂɛ.bjaˈtɔf.ska]; née Pesta, Polish: [ˈpɛs.ta]; born 8 September 1956) is a Polish politician and schoolteacher. She was a member of the Sejm of Poland from 2011 to 2015, representing the constituency no. 41, consisting of the western portion of the West Pomeranian Voivodeship.

== Biography ==
Ewa Żmuda-Trzebiatowska (née Pesta) was born on 8 September 1956 in the city of Szczecin, located in the West Pomeranian Voivodeship, Poland. In 2007, she graduated from the University of Humanities and Economics in Łódź (then known as the Higher School of Humanities and Economics) with a master's degree in German studies. Żmuda-Trzebiatowska also received a postgraduate degrees in public relations from the West Pomeranian Business School in Szczecin in 2008, and educational institutions management from the Casimir the Great University in Bydgoszcz (then known as the Casimir the Great Bydgoszcz Academy) in 2010. She worked as schoolteacher of German as the second language, among others, working in a secondary school in the town of Wolin in West Pomeranian Voivodeship.

Żmuda-Trzebiatowska was a member of the Civic Platform party. In the 2010 election, she was elected to the city council in Świnoujście, from the constituency no. 3, receiving 264 votes (5.57%). In the 2011 election, Żmuda-Trzebiatowska was then elected to the Sejm of Poland from the constituency no. 41, consisting of the western portion of the West Pomeranian Voivodeship. She received 4,906 votes (1.29%). Żmuda-Trzebiatowska subsequently resigned from the city council. She unsuccessfully run for the reelection to the Sejm in 2015, receiving 5,351 votes (1.41%).

== Personal life ==
She has a daughter.

== Electoral results ==
Year	Office		Party	Constituency	Votes			Result	Ref.
Year	Office		Party	Constituency	Total	%	P.	Result	Ref.
2010	Świnoujście City Council	6th	Civic Platform	No. 3	264	5.57	3rd	Won	
2011	Sejm of Poland	7th	Civic Platform	No. 41	4,906	1.29	13th	Won	
2011	Sejm of Poland	8th	Civic Platform	No. 41	5,351	1.41	20th	Lost	
