= Piotr Banasiak =

Polish footballer

Personal information
- Full name: Piotr Banasiak
- Date of birth: 19 July 1987 (age 39)
- Place of birth: Radom, Poland
- Height: 1.89 m (6 ft 2 in)
- Position: Goalkeeper

Team information
- Current team: Ząbkovia Ząbki
- Number: 22

Youth career
- 2003–2004: Radomiak Radom

Senior career*
Years	Team	Apps	(Gls)
2005–2017	Radomiak Radom		
2018–2019	Pilica Nowe Miasto nad Pilicą	24	(0)
2019–	Ząbkovia Ząbki	5	(0)
- * Club domestic league appearances and goals as of 17:36, 5 June 2026 (UTC)

Piotr Banasiak (born 19 July 1987), nicknamed Banan, is a Polish footballer who plays as a goalkeeper for III liga club Ząbkovia Ząbki.

Having been born and raised in Radom, he spent over twelve years playing professionally for his hometown club Radomiak Radom, making him a club legend.

He semi-retired in 2017, and stated his intention to join the traditional workforce.

His brother Michał was also a former goalkeeper, although only semi-professional and amateur levels.

== Honours ==
Radomiak Radom

- III liga Łódź–Masovia: 2011–12, 2014–15

Ząbkovia Ząbki

- IV liga Masovia - Warsaw: 2020–21
