= Cezary Olejniczak =

Polish politician (born 1972)

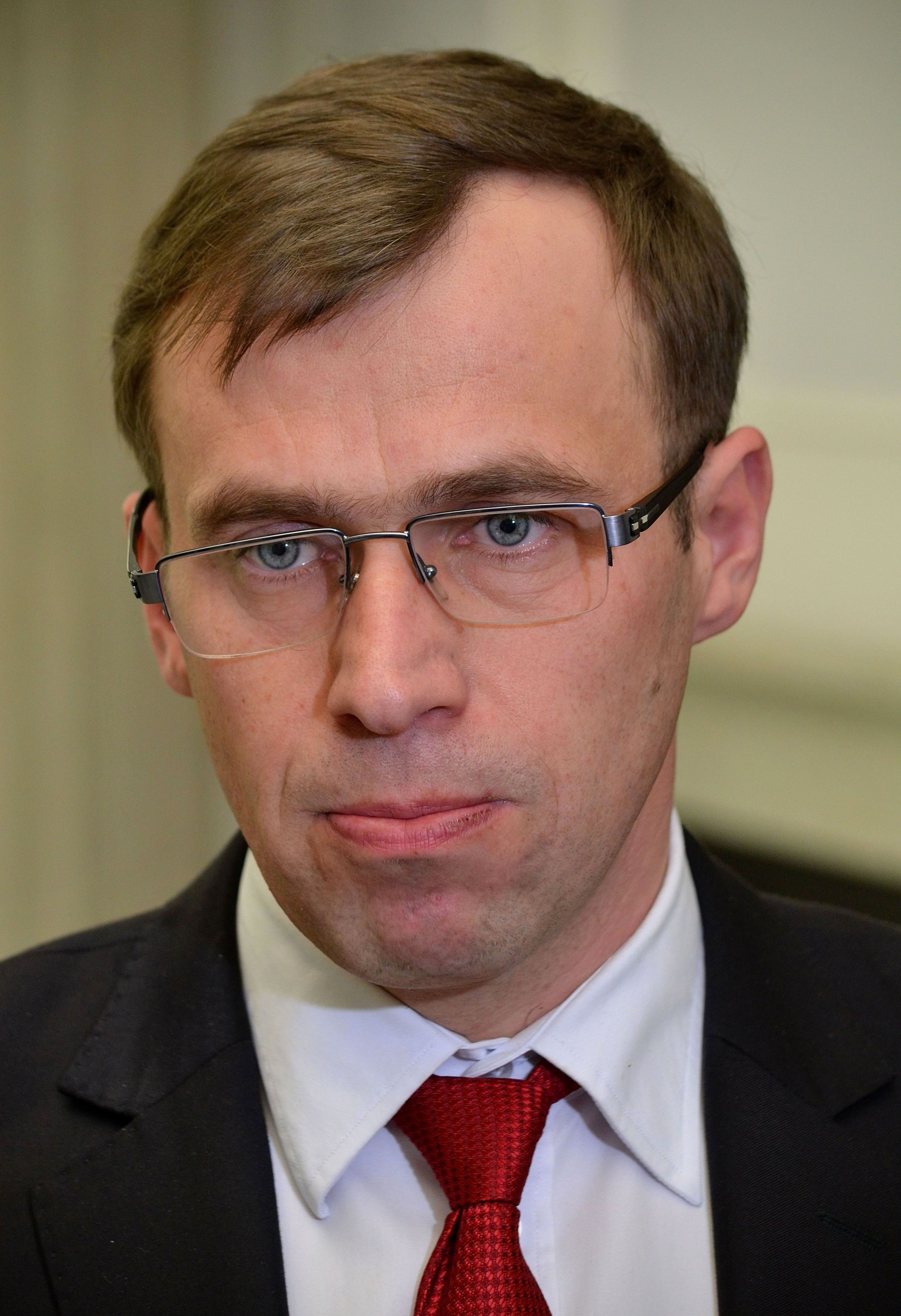

Member of the Sejm
- In office 8 November 2011 – 11 November 2015

Personal details
- Born: 12 October 1972 (age 53) Łowicz, Poland
- Party: Democratic Left Alliance

Cezary Olejniczak (born 12 October 1972) is a Polish politician. Member of the Sejm (2011-2015) for Democratic Left Alliance. Older brother of other Polish left-wing politician Wojciech Olejniczak.

== Electoral history ==
Sejm
Election	Party	Votes	%	Constituency	Elected?
2011	Democratic Left Alliance	7,082	2.08	Sieradz	Yes
