= Waldemar Szadny =

Polish politician

member of Sejm 2005-2007
- In office 25 September 2005 – 2007

Personal details
- Born: 8 May 1961 (age 64)
- Party: Civic Platform

Waldemar Romuald Szadny (born 8 May 1961 in Gorzów Wielkopolski) is a Polish politician. He was elected to the Sejm on 25 September 2005, getting 5941 votes in 8 Zielona Góra district as a candidate from the Civic Platform list.

== See also ==
- Members of Polish Sejm 2005-2007
