= Casimir the Great University =

University in Bydgoszcz, Poland

Coordinates: 53°7′51″N 18°1′11″E

- Uniwersytet Kazimierza Wielkiego w Bydgoszczy
- Latin: Universitas Casimiri Magni Bydgostiensis
- Type: Public
- Established: 1969
- Academic affiliations: Socrates-Erasmus, Leonardo da Vinci, Comenius
- Rector: Jacek Woźny
- Academic staff: 700
- Students: 6,939 (12.2023)
- Undergraduates: 9440
- Other students: 150
- Location: Chodkiewicza 30, 85-064 Bydgoszcz, Bydgoszcz, Kuyavian-Pomeranian, Poland
- Campus: Urban
- Newspaper: Gazeta Uniwersytecka
- Sporting affiliations: Academic Sports Association
- Website: www.ukw.edu.pl/strona/english

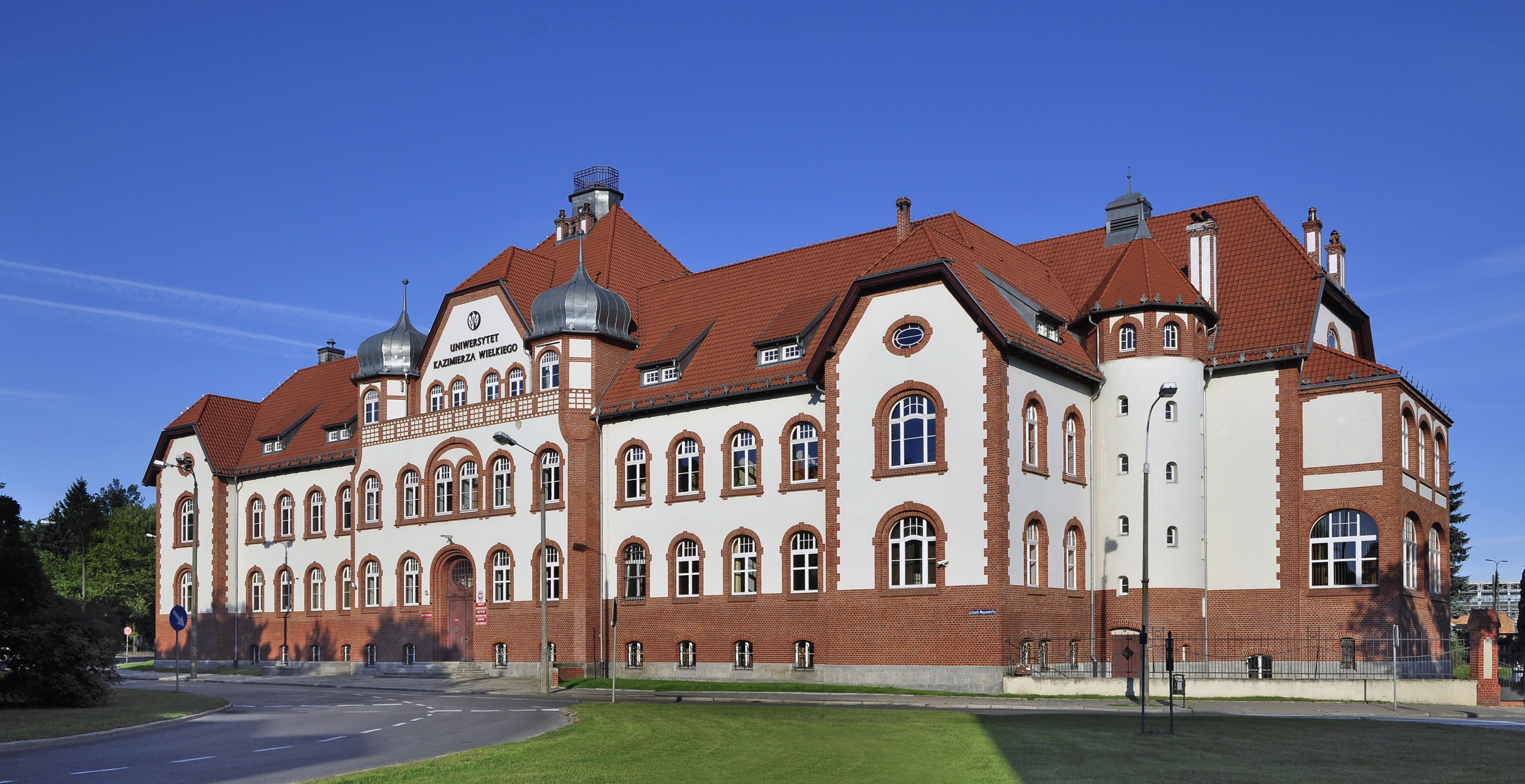
Main building of the Faculty of Mathematics, Physics and Technology

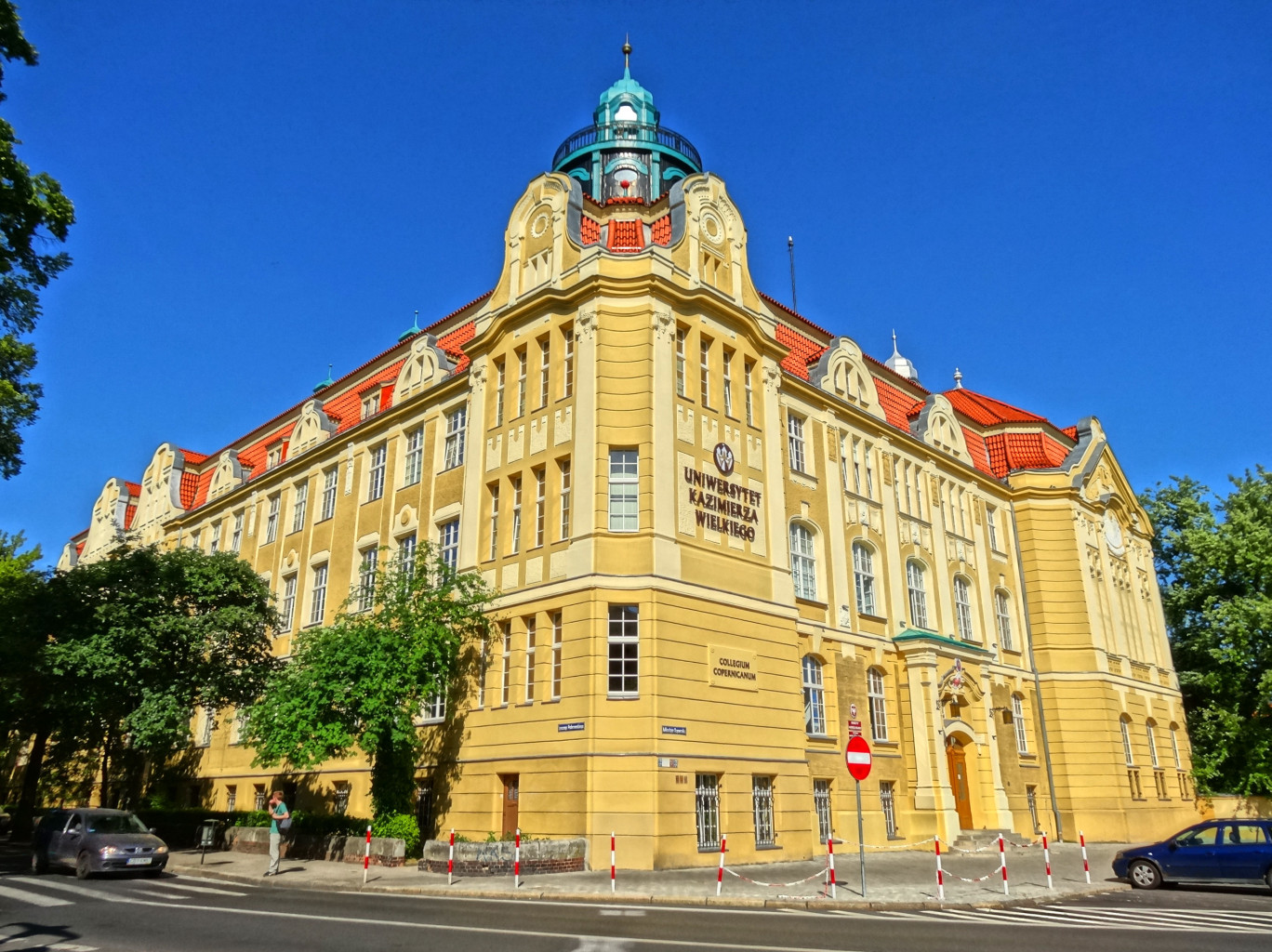
Institute of Mechanics and Applied Informatics

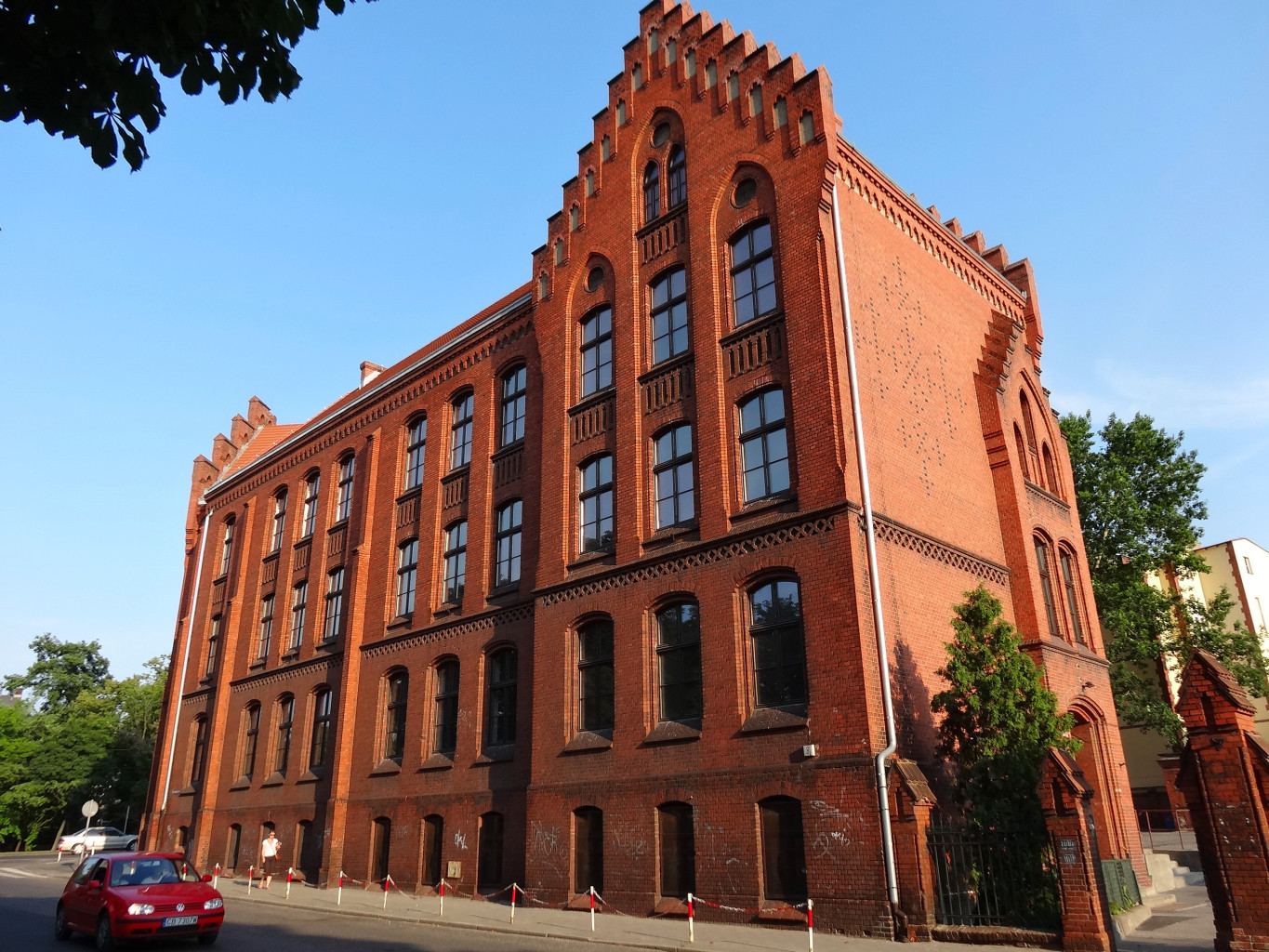
Department of Journalism and Communication

Casimir the Great University (Polish: Uniwersytet Kazimierza Wielkiego; UKW) is a state-funded university in Bydgoszcz, Poland. It was named after Casimir III the Great, the King of Poland (1333–70) who granted the city municipal rights on 19 April 1346.

== History ==
Casimir the Great University is a public university founded in 1968. As the university expanded, its organization structure and name changed.

It began as the Teachers Training College (1969–74) with three faculties: Humanities, Mathematics & Natural Sciences, and Pedagogy. It became the Higher School of Pedagogy from 1974 to 2000 devoted to teacher training. Then it became the Kazimierz Wielki Academy of Bydgoszcz from 2000 to 2005, and it has been the Kazimierz Wielki University since 13 May 2005.

== Faculties ==
- Faculty of Humanities
- Faculty of Mathematics, Physics and Technical Sciences
- Faculty of Natural Sciences
- Faculty of Pedagogy and Psychology
- Faculty of Administration and Social Sciences
- Faculty of Physical Education, Health and Tourism

== Staff and student numbers ==
Casimir the Great University offers about 100 courses of study and specialties. In 2010 on university studied 14 000 students, of which about 33% were people from outside the region Kuyavian-Pomeranian. The university employed approximately 1,100 people, including 665 academic staff, 150 professors (including 60 titular).

== University authorities ==
- Rector Magnificus: Prof. Janusz Ostoja-Zagórski
- Vice-Rector for University Organisation and Development: Prof. Piotr Malinowski
- Vice-Rector for Research and International Relations: Prof. Sławomir Kaczmarek
- Vice-Rector for Education: Prof. Roman Leppert
- Administrative Director: Ewa Warczak, M.Sc.

=== Former rectors ===
- Bolesław Ratusiow (23 March 1982 – 23 January 1984)
- Kazimierz Nowak (23 January 1984 – ?)
- Józef Banaszak (? – 31 August 1999)
- Michał de Tchorzewski (1 September 1999 – 31 August 2002)
- Adam Marcinkowski (1 September 2003 – 31 August 2006)
- Józef Kubik (since 1 September 2006)

== See also ==
- List of universities in Poland
- University of Technology and Life Sciences in Bydgoszcz
- Collegium Medicum in Bydgoszcz of the Nicolaus Copernicus University in Toruń
- Kujawsko-Pomorska Digital Library
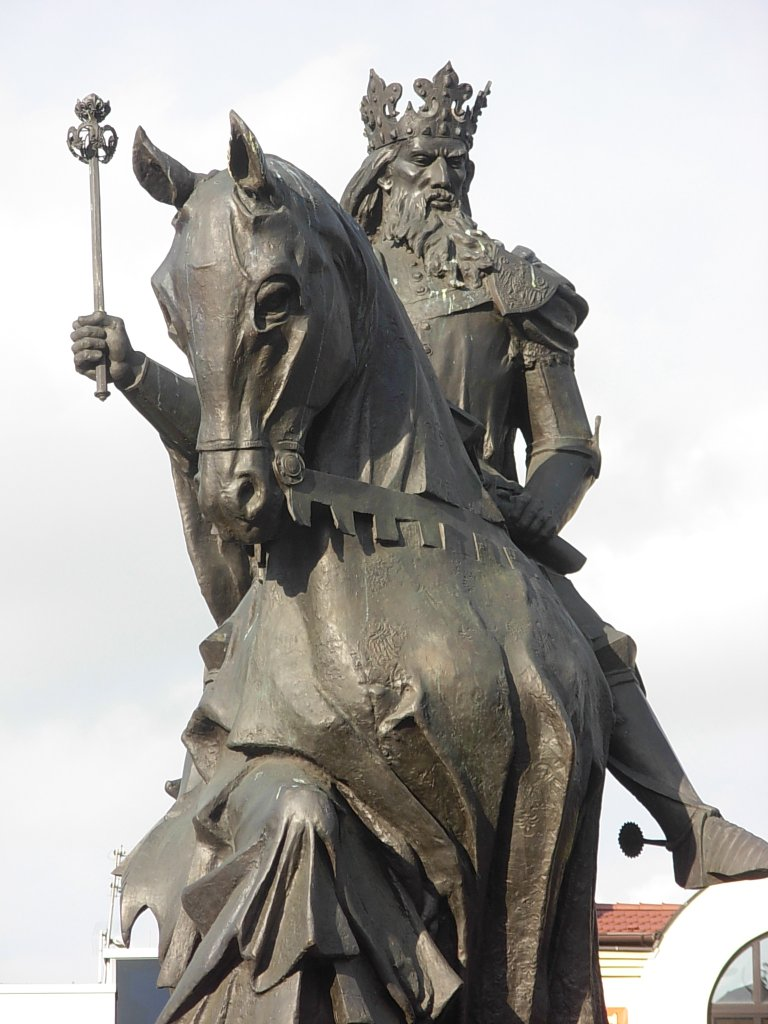
Casimir III the Great statue in Bydgoszcz

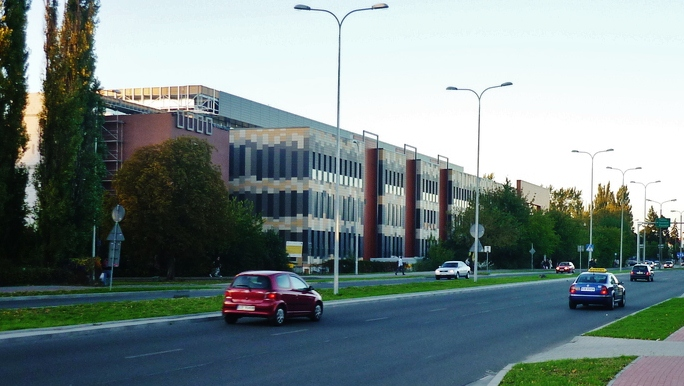
Main library building

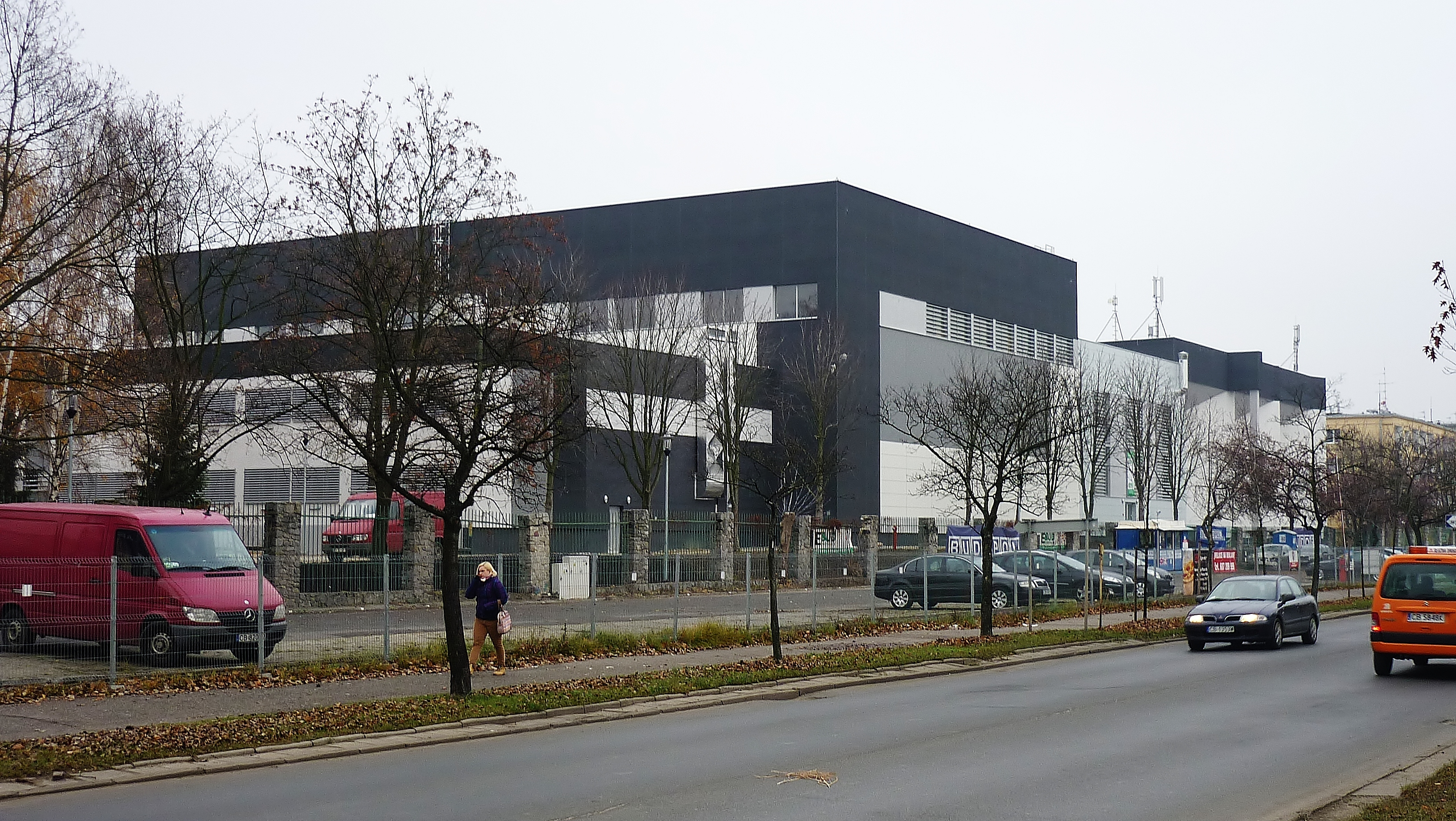
Sports centre
