= Renata Janik =

Polish politician

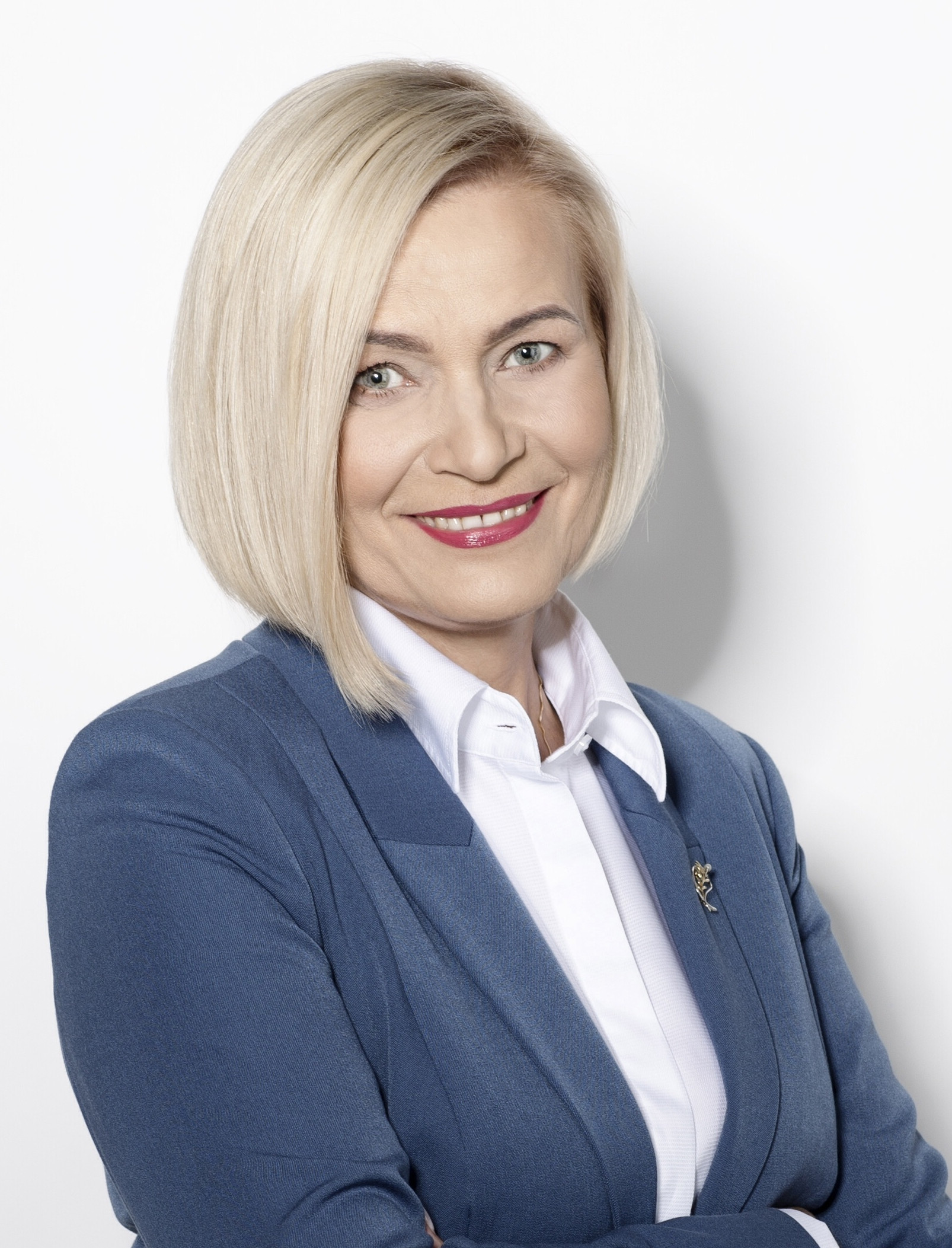
- Janik in 2023

Marshal of Świętokrzyskie Voivodeship
- Incumbent
- Assumed office 6 May 2024
- President: Andrzej Duda; Karol Nawrocki
- Prime Minister: Donald Tusk
- Preceded by: Andrzej Bętkowski

Personal details
- Born: 18 September 1965 (age 61) Zagnańsk, Polish People's Republic
- Citizenship: Poland
- Party: Law and Justice
- Other political affiliations: Agreement; Civic Platform
- Education: Kraków University of Economics
- Occupation: Politician
- Awards: Cross of Merit

Renata Urszula Janik (née Jończyk) (born September 18, 1965 in Zagnańsk) is a Polish politician, local government official, and social activist who served as Vice-Chairwoman of the Kielce County Council (2010–2013), Member of Parliament (2013–2015), Vice-Marshal of the Świętokrzyskie Voivodeship (2018–2024) and is serving as Marshal of the Świętokrzyskie Voivodeship since May 2024.

== Biography ==
She graduated from the Kraków University of Economics (with a degree in management and marketing in 1999) and completed postgraduate studies in EU funds administration at the Warsaw School of Economics (2010). From May 2004 to June 2007, she headed the Organizational and Civic Affairs Department of the Zagnańsk Commune Office. From July 2007 to January 2009, she worked at the Świętokrzyskie Regional Development Office.

She is a co-founder and activist of the associations "Together for All" (dedicated to promoting knowledge about the Świętokrzyskie region, culture, and rural traditions), "W krainie Tetrapoda" (supporting the development of the village of Zachełmie), and "Braterskie Serca" (an organization creating occupational therapy workshops).

In February 2007, she joined the Civic Platform party. In January 2009, she became director of the Organizational and Administrative Department of the Marshal's Office of the Świętokrzyskie Voivodeship. In the 2010 local elections, she won a seat on the Kielce County council and assumed the position of deputy chairwoman of the council. In the 2011 parliamentary elections, she received 3,621 votes, failing to secure a seat. Following the death of MP Konstanty Miodowicz, she succeeded him in office and took the oath of office on September 11, 2013. She was not re-elected in the 2015 elections. In April 2016, she resigned from the Civic Platform. In July 2017, she resigned as director of the Municipal Office department and joined Poland Together. At the beginning of the following month, she became an advisor to the party's president, Deputy Prime Minister, and Minister of Science and Higher Education, Jarosław Gowin. In November of that same year, the grouping transformed into the Agreement party, and Renata Janik joined its national board. From 2021, she led the Świętokrzyskie branch of the party, but left in 2022. That same year, she became involved in the OdNowa RP association.

In 2018, she won a councilor seat in the Świętokrzyskie regional assembly from the Law and Justice party. In November of that year, she was elected deputy marshal in the new voivodeship board. She was also a member of the supervisory board of the Polish Technology Centre Wrocław. In 2024, she was elected to the regional council for another term. On May 6 of the same year, she was appointed voivodeship marshal. In October of that same year, she joined the Law and Justice party.
