= Roman Ludwiczuk =

Polish politician

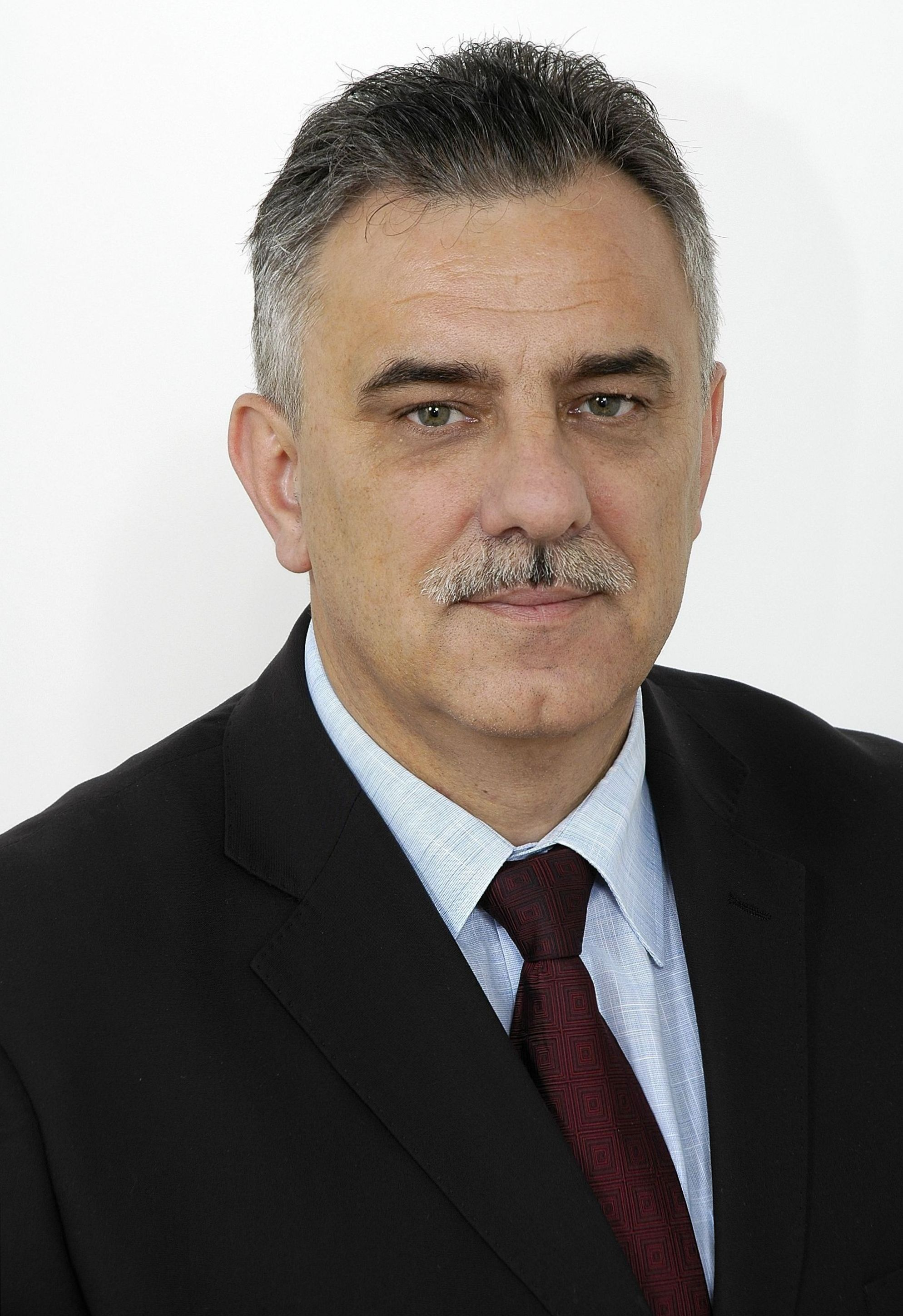
Roman Ludwiczuk

Roman Edward Ludwiczuk (born 29 August 1957) was a Polish senator, representing Civic Platform.

He was president of Polish Basketball Association (Polski Związek Koszykówki, PZKosz) and club Górnik Wałbrzych.
