= Tomasz Kulesza =

Polish politician

Member of Sejm
- In office 25 September 2005 – 2015

Personal details
- Born: 1959 (age 66–67)
- Party: Civic Platform (2005-2015); Centre for Poland (2022-present)

Tomasz Jerzy Kulesza (born 14 June 1959 in Jarosław) is a Polish politician. He was elected to the Sejm in 22 Krosno district on 25 September 2005, with 5,621 votes, as a candidate from the Civic Platform list. He was re-elected in 2007 and 2011.

On 13 October 2022, Kulesza joined the newly-launched Centre for Poland, which will be part of the Polish Coalition.

== See also ==
- Members of Polish Sejm 2005-2007
- Members of Polish Sejm 2007-2011
- Members of Polish Sejm 2011-2015
