= Beata Dorota Sawicka =

Polish politician (born 1964)

member of Sejm 2005-2007
- In office 25 September 2005 – 4 September 2007

Personal details
- Born: 23 March 1964 (age 62)
- Party: Civic Platform

Beata Dorota Sawicka (born 23 March 1964 in Oława) is a Polish politician. She was elected to the Sejm on 25 September 2005, getting 8,764 votes in 1 Legnica district as a candidate from the Civic Platform list.

== See also ==
- Members of Polish Sejm 2005-2007
