= Robert Ambroziewicz =

Polish politician

member of Sejm 2005-2007
- In office 25 September 2005 – ?

Personal details
- Born: 18 February 1969 (age 57)
- Party: Civic Platform

Robert Wiesław Ambroziewicz (born 18 February 1969 in Siedlce) is a Polish politician. He was elected to the Sejm on 25 September 2005, getting 9943 votes in 18 Siedlce district as a candidate from the Civic Platform list.

== See also ==
- Members of Polish Sejm 2005-2007
