= Małgorzata Pępek =

Polish politician (born 1961)

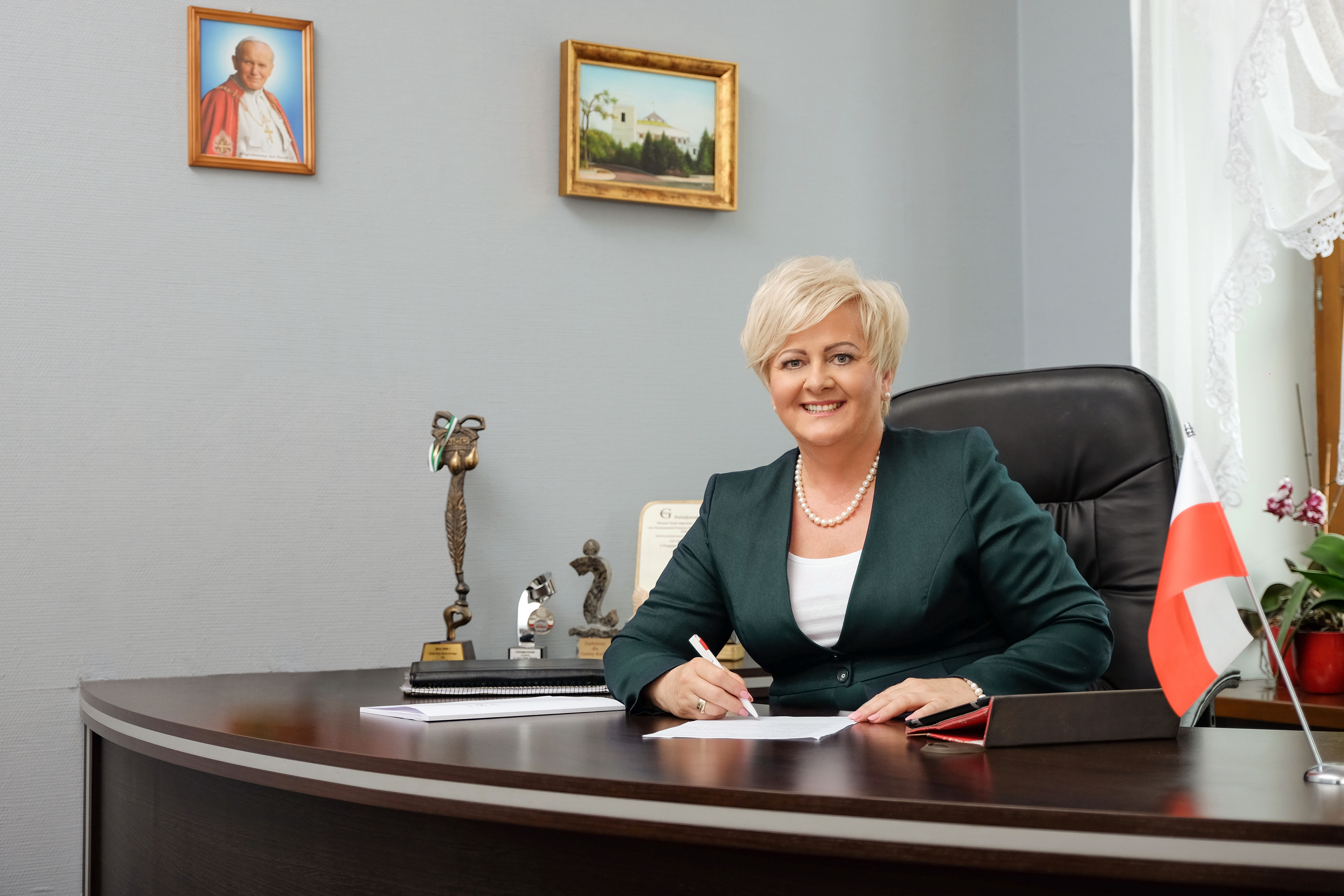

Member of the Sejm
- Incumbent
- Assumed office 2011

Personal details
- Born: 1961 (age 64–65)
- Party: Civic Platform

Małgorzata Pępek (born 1961) is a Polish politician, in 2002–2011 the head of Gmina Ślemień. Elected to the Sejm in 2011, 2015, 2019.
