= Andrzej Gałażewski =

Polish politician (born 1944)

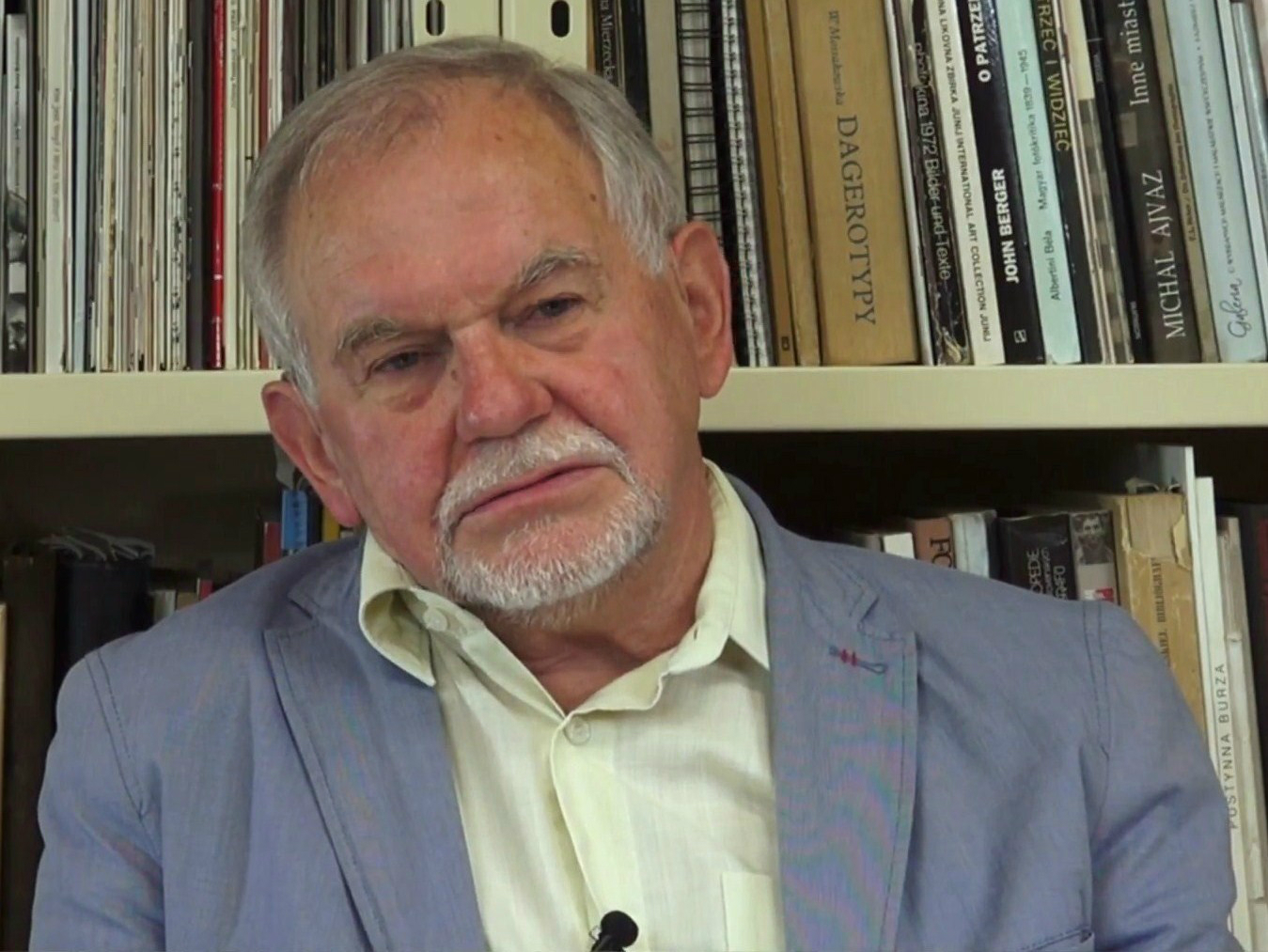

Member of Sejm
- In office 19 October 2001 – 11 November 2015

Personal details
- Born: 20 April 1944 (age 81) Kraków
- Party: Civic Platform

Andrzej Józef Gałażewski (born 20 April 1944) is a Polish politician. He was elected to the Sejm on 25 September 2005, getting 9524 votes in 29 Gliwice district as a candidate from the Civic Platform list.

He was also a member of Sejm 2001–2005.

== See also ==
- Members of Polish Sejm 2005–2007
