= Ewa Więckowska =

Polish politician

member of Sejm 2005-2007
- In office 25 September 2005 – 2007

Personal details
- Born: 29 December 1958 (age 67)
- Party: Civic Platform

Ewa Małgorzata Więckowska (born 29 December 1958 in Zabrze) is a Polish politician. She was elected to the Sejm on 25 September 2005, getting 7018 votes in 29 Gliwice district as a candidate from the Civic Platform list.

== See also ==
- Members of Polish Sejm 2005-2007
