= Krzysztof Grzegorek =

Polish politician (born 1961)

Member of the Sejm
- Incumbent
- Assumed office 25 September 2005
- Constituency: 33 – Kielce

Personal details
- Born: 5 May 1961 (age 64)
- Party: Civic Platform

Krzysztof Józef Grzegorek (born 5 May 1961 in Sieradz) is a Polish politician. He was elected to the Sejm on 25 September 2005, getting 8,730 votes in 33 Kielce district as a candidate from the Civic Platform list.

Grzegorek was a deputy Minister of Health starting on 21 November 2007, but after accusations of previous misconduct (corruption) he resigned on 2 June 2008.

== See also ==
- Members of Polish Sejm 2005-2007
