= Jerzy Żyżyński =

Polish politician and economist

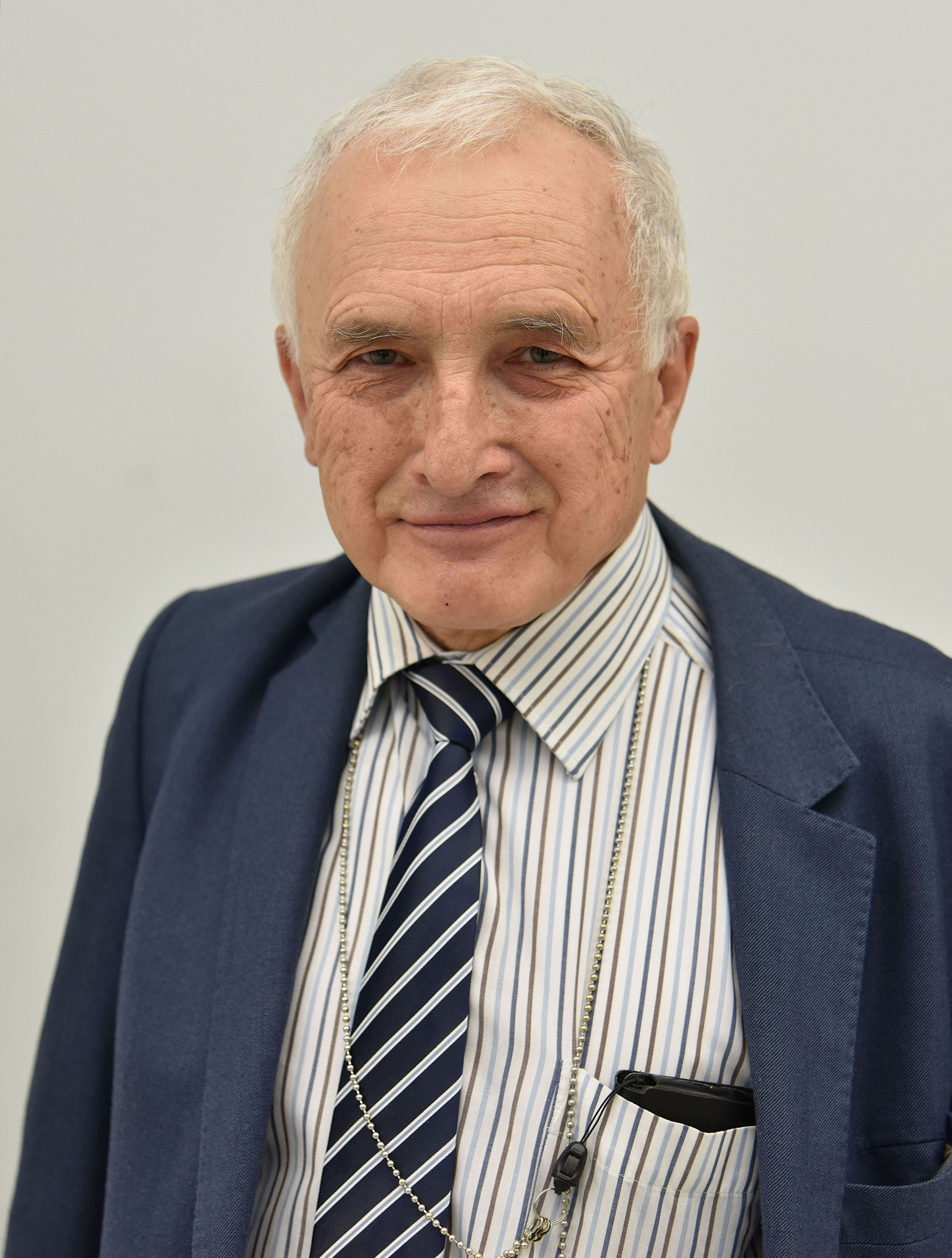
- Jerzy Żyżyński
- Born: 6 August 1949 (age 76); Warsaw, Poland
- Occupations: Polish politician and economist

Jerzy Żyżyński (born 6 August 1949 in Łomża) is a Polish economist, a professor of economics, a specialist in management, economic commentator, since 2011 election member of parliament.

== Biography ==
In 1972, he graduated from the Faculty of Economics, University of Warsaw. In 1983, obtained the degree of doctor, and in 1997, habilitated at the Faculty of Management at Warsaw University. In 2011 received the title of professor. The research work deals with the economics of the public sector, fiscal and monetary policies and their mutual relations.

He completed internships abroad: the Faculty of Economics at the University of Panama (1987), the University of Edinburgh Management School (1992), the University of Glasgow (1994). In 2002, visiting professor at Le Moyne College in Syracuse, New York.

After graduation he worked for two years as an assistant at the Institute of Organization, Management and Economics of the Construction Industry. Since 1974 is an employee of the Department of Management at Warsaw University, where until 1983 he was assistant, then assistant professor and since 1999 works as a professor. In 2000–2001 he was Head of the Department of Quantitative Methods for Management. In 2002 he was head of the Department of Public Economy. During 1992–1995, he worked with the College of Banking and Insurance. He works as a professor at the Faculty of Sociology and Management School of Economic and Humanities in Skierniewice. In 2000–2002, he taught at the School of Organization and Management Bogdan Janski.

From 1990 to 1993, he was part of the Senate of the University of Warsaw, and in 1997 became a member of the Works Committee "Solidarity" at Warsaw University.

From 1981 to 1985, he worked for the Department of Social Studies Central Statistical Office. From 1985 to 1989 he worked as a consultant and analyst at the Center for Public Opinion Research. From 1988 to 1992 worked with the Warsaw radio station, Radio For You, was the author of essays and commentaries in economics.

In 1993–1996, he worked as an economic expert in the Team of the Budget and Finance Office of Research Office of the Parliament. From 1998 to 2004, served on the Economic and Social Council at the Government Centre for Strategic Studies. He was an expert parliamentary committees of inquiry: for privatization of PZU (2005) and for privatization of the banking sector (2006–2007). In 2006–2007, he was a member of the Supervisory Board of KGHM Polish Copper.

In elections in 2011, he gained a parliamentary seat in the Opole region.
