= Anna Zielińska-Głębocka =

Polish politician (born 1949)

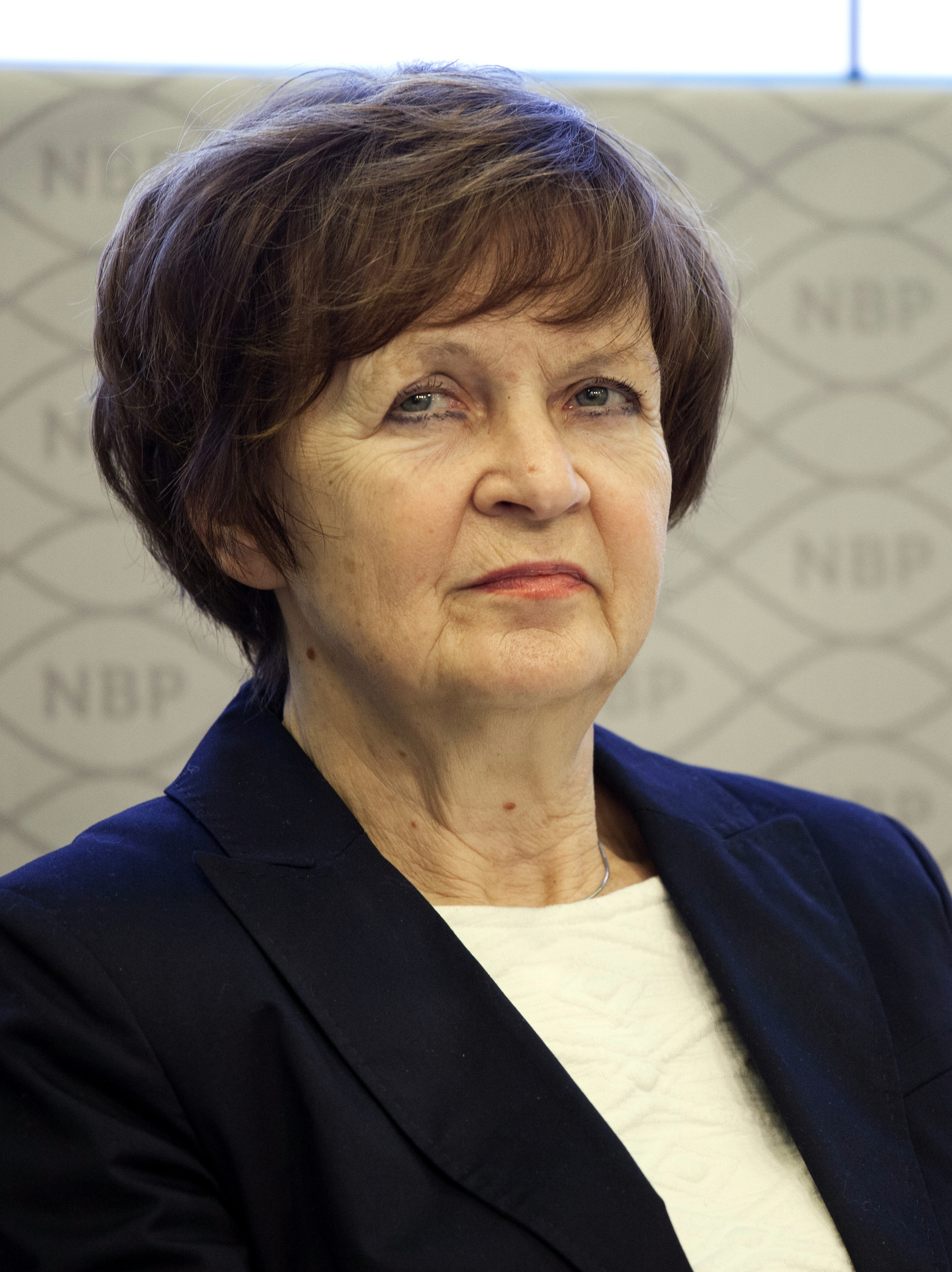

Member of the Sejm
- In office 25 September 2005 – 9 February 2010
- Constituency: 25 – Gdańsk

Personal details
- Born: 29 September 1949 (age 76) Bydgoszcz
- Party: Civic Platform

Anna Maria Zielińska-Głębocka (born 29 September 1949) is a Polish politician. She was elected to the Sejm on 25 September 2005, getting 3797 votes in 25 Gdańsk district as a candidate from the Civic Platform list.

== See also ==
- Members of Polish Sejm 2005-2007
