= Krystyna Skowrońska =

Polish politician

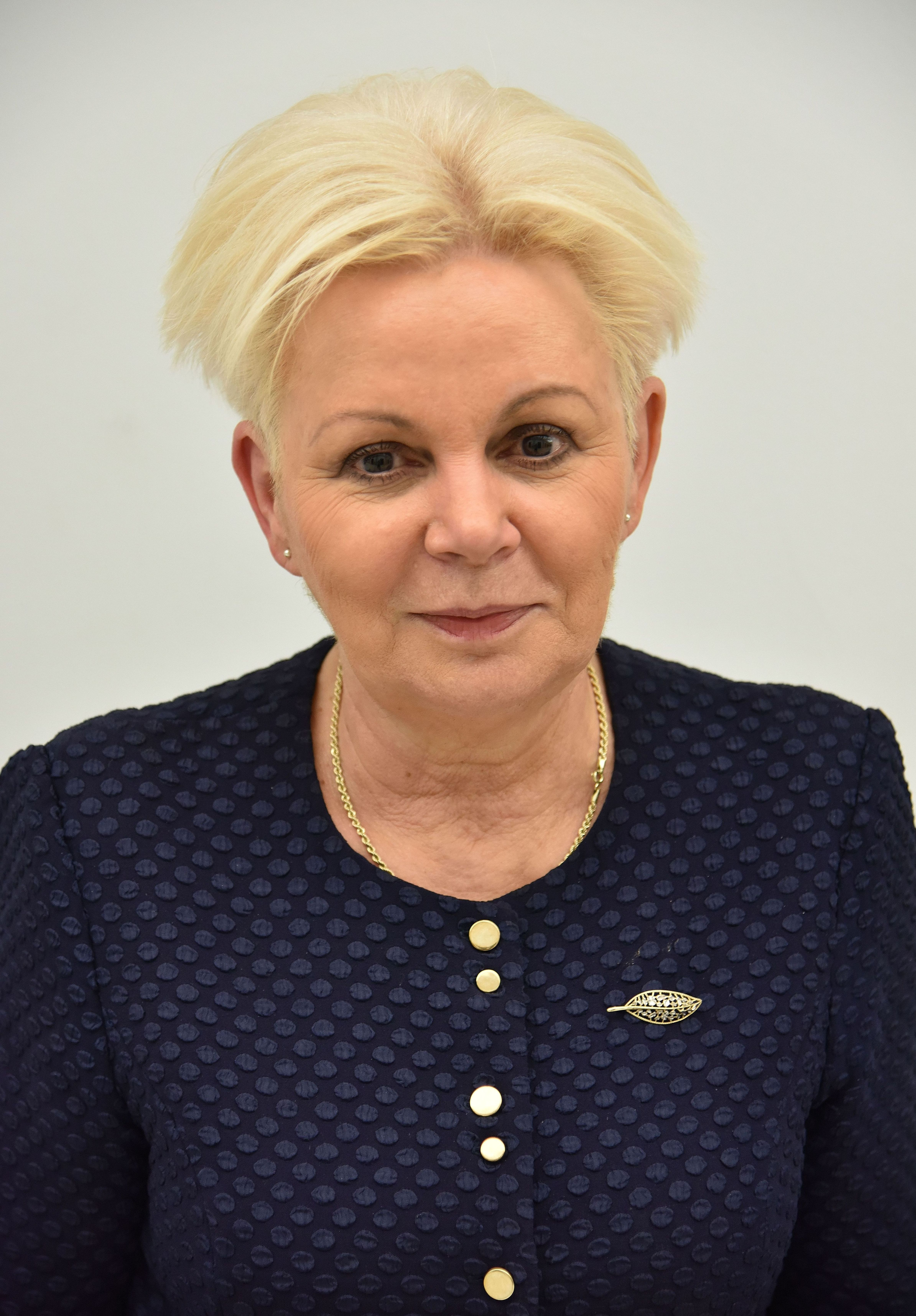

Member of Sejm
- Incumbent
- Assumed office 19 October 2001

Personal details
- Born: 22 July 1954 (age 72)
- Party: Civic Platform

Krystyna Skowrońska (born 22 July 1954 in Mielec) is a Polish politician. She was elected to Sejm on 25 September 2005, getting 16479 votes in 23 Rzeszów district as a candidate from the Civic Platform list.

She was also a member of Sejm 2001-2005.

== See also ==
- Members of Polish Sejm 2005-2007
