= Aleksandra Banasiak =

Polish nurse (born 1935)

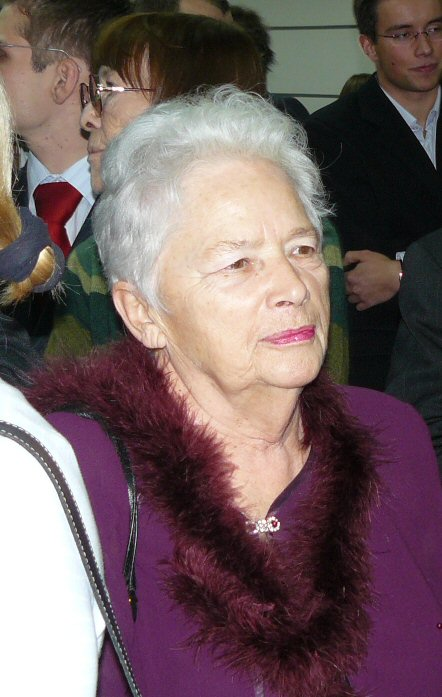
Banasiak in 2007

Aleksandra Banasiak (born 1935 in Karsy) is a Polish nurse. She became noted for her actions during the Poznań 1956 protests. She later became a politician.

In 1951 she began half-year nursing course in the School of Nursing in Piła, in February of the following year she started working at City Hospital No. 2 in Poznan. She passed the nursing examination before the Examination Board in 1955. Since 1956 she was employed in the hospital at Raszei in Poznan. In the Poznan protests in 1956, she went to the hospital despite having the day off. Hearing the cries of the injured, she went into the street to help victims. She was hit by a stray bullet in the midst of the shooting. "I'll never forget the chanting crowd, the euphoria when the huge red communist flag fell from the roof of the building," she said years later. When questioned at the trial, she confessed that the police were the first to shoot, contradicting the official version of events.

She received the Florence Nightingale award in 2005. In 2007 she ran for parliament on the Civic Platform. In 2010 she supported Ryszard Grobelny's candidacy for mayor of Poznan.
