= Marek Wójcik =

Polish politician (born 1980)

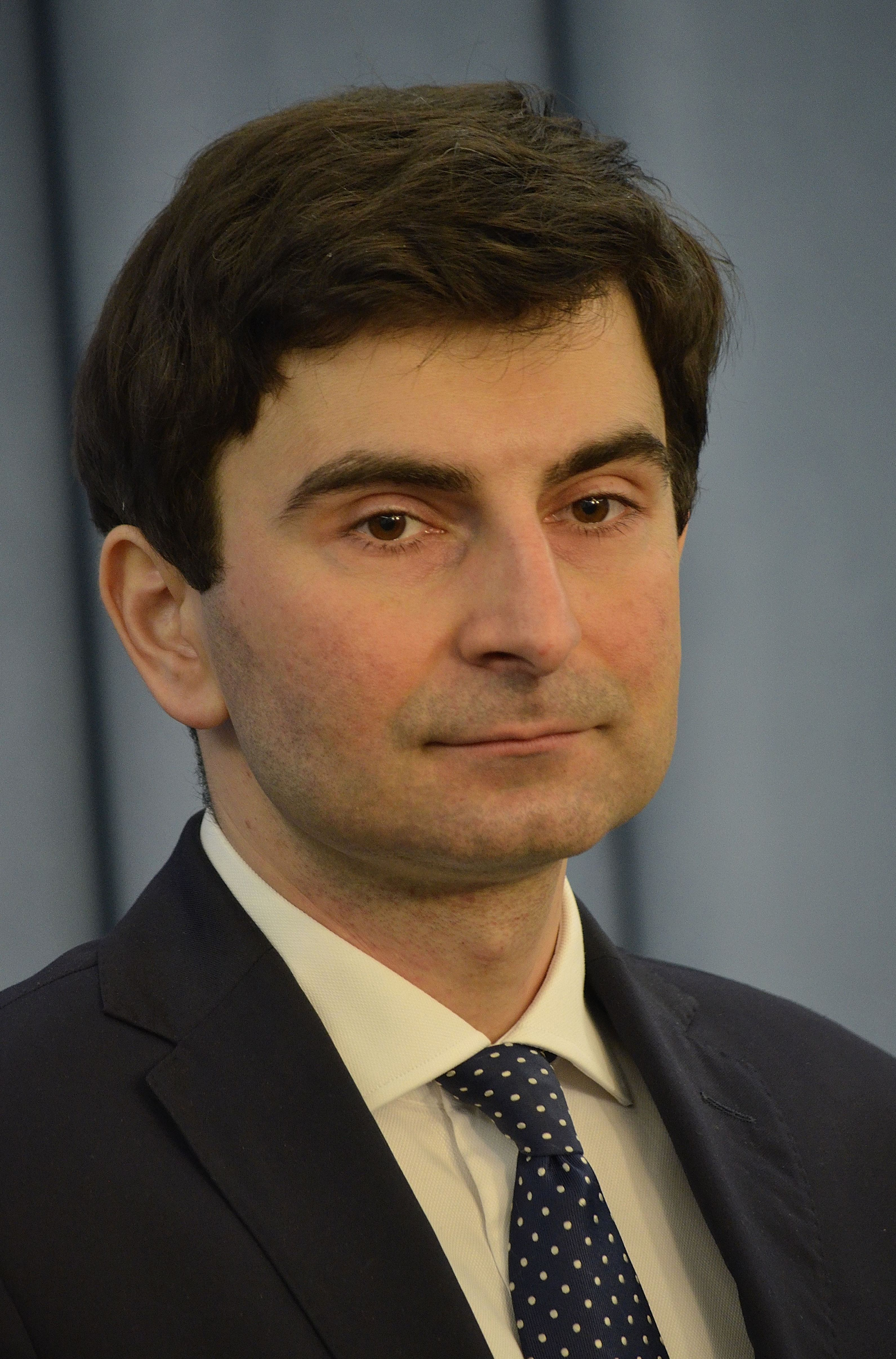

Voivode of Silesian Voivodeship
- Incumbent
- Assumed office December 2023
- Preceded by: Jarosław Wieczorek

Member of the Sejm
- In office 25 September 2005 – 2019
- Constituency: 31 – Katowice

Personal details
- Born: 24 March 1980 (age 46) Katowice, Polish People's Republic
- Party: Civic Platform
- Education: University of Silesia; WSB University

Marek Krzysztof Wójcik (born 24 March 1980 in Katowice) is a Polish politician. He was elected to the Sejm on 25 September 2005, getting 4408 votes in 31 Katowice district as a candidate from the Civic Platform list. In December 2023 he was appointed the Voivode of Silesian Voivodeship.

== See also ==
- Members of Polish Sejm 2005-2007
