= Domicela Kopaczewska =

Polish politician (born 1958)

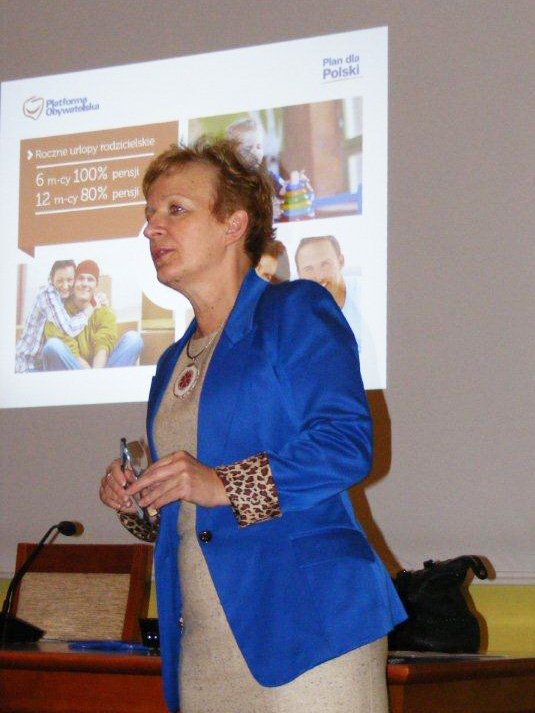

Member of the Sejm
- Incumbent
- Assumed office 25 September 2005
- Constituency: 5 – Toruń

Personal details
- Born: 1958 (age 67–68)
- Party: Civic Platform

Domicela Katarzyna Kopaczewska (born 4 October 1958 in Aleksandrów Kujawski) is a Polish politician. She was elected to the Sejm on 25 September 2005, getting 4,870 votes in 5 Toruń district as a candidate from the Civic Platform list.

== See also ==
- Members of Polish Sejm 2005-2007
