= Jan Rzymełka =

Polish politician

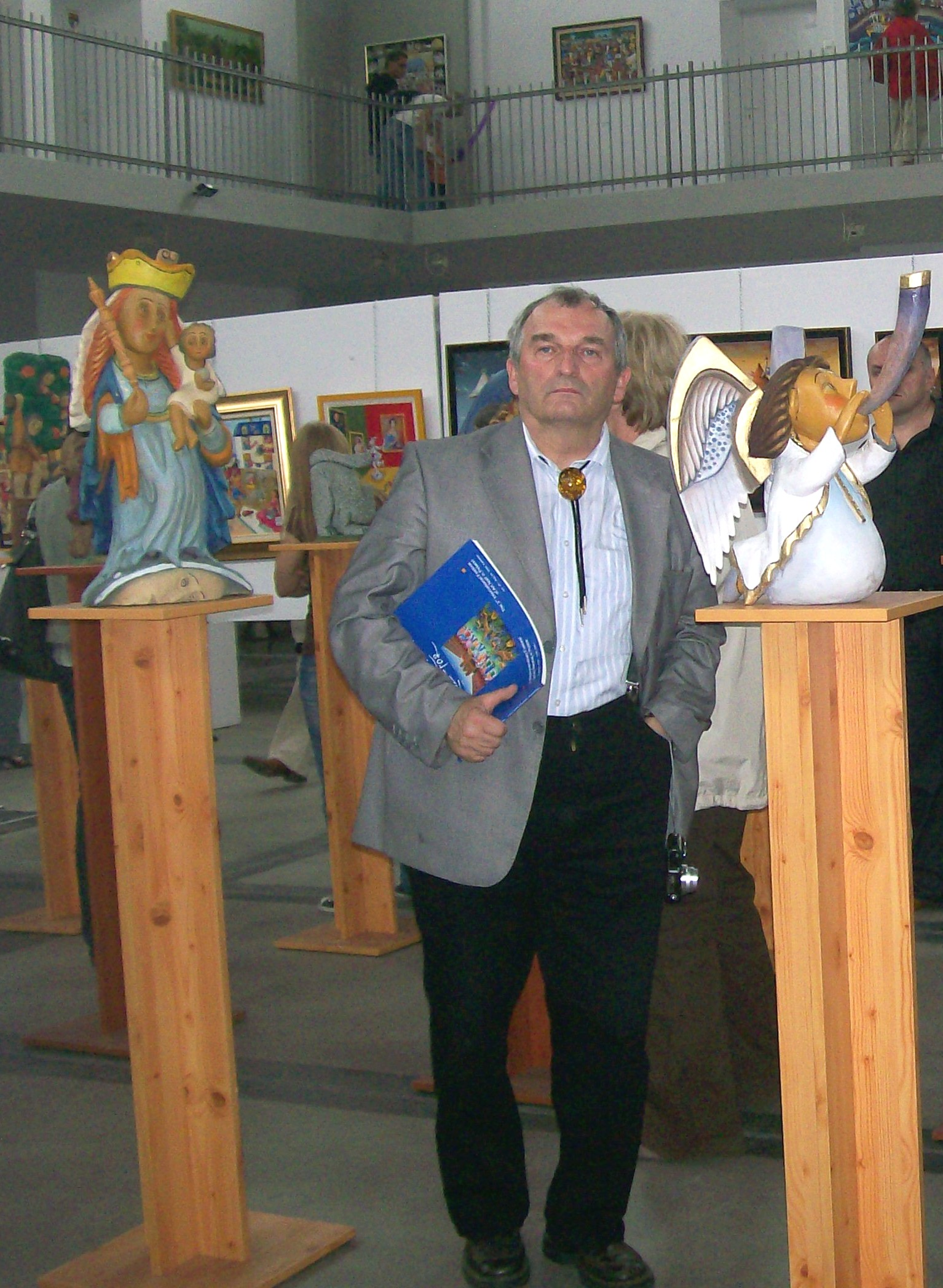

Member of the Sejm
- Incumbent
- Assumed office 25 September 2005
- Constituency: 31 – Katowice

Personal details
- Born: 1952 (age 73–74)
- Party: Civic Platform

Jan Antoni Rzymełka (born 7 June 1952 in Katowice) is a Polish politician. He was elected to the Sejm on 25 September 2005, getting 8,878 votes in 31 Katowice district as a candidate from the Civic Platform list.

He was also a member of the Sejm 1989–1991 in the People's Republic of Poland, Sejm 1991–1993, Sejm 1997–2001, and Sejm 2001–2005.

== See also ==
- Members of Polish Sejm 2005–2007
