= Damian Raczkowski =

Polish politician

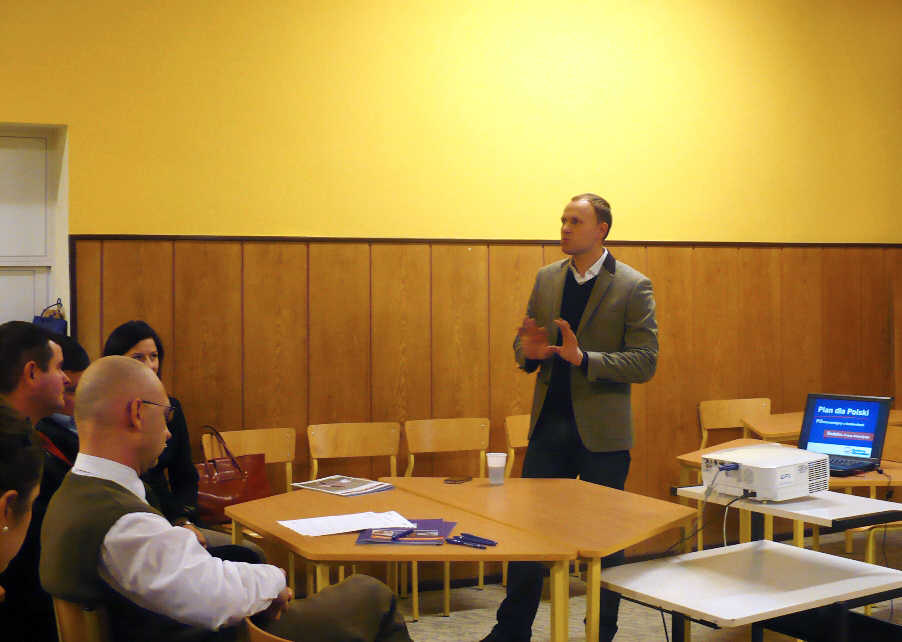

Member of the Sejm
- In office 25 September 2005 – 11 November 2015
- Constituency: 24 – Białystok

Personal details
- Born: April 11, 1975 (age 50) Białystok, Poland
- Party: Civic Platform

Damian Raczkowski (born 11 April 1975 in Białystok) is a Polish politician. He was elected to the Sejm on 25 September 2005, getting 5,527 votes in 24 Białystok district as a candidate from the Civic Platform list.

== See also ==
- Members of Polish Sejm 2005-2007
