= Elżbieta Pierzchała =

Polish politician (born 1954)

Member of the Sejm
- Incumbent
- Assumed office 25 September 2005
- Constituency: 31 – Katowice

Personal details
- Born: 1954 (age 71–72)
- Party: Civic Platform

Elżbieta Apolonia Pierzchała (born 5 July 1954 in Sosnowiec) is a Polish politician. She was elected to the Sejm on 25 September 2005, getting 10,646 votes in 31 Katowice district as a candidate from the Civic Platform list.

== See also ==
- Members of Polish Sejm 2005-2007
