= Konstanty Miodowicz =

Polish politician

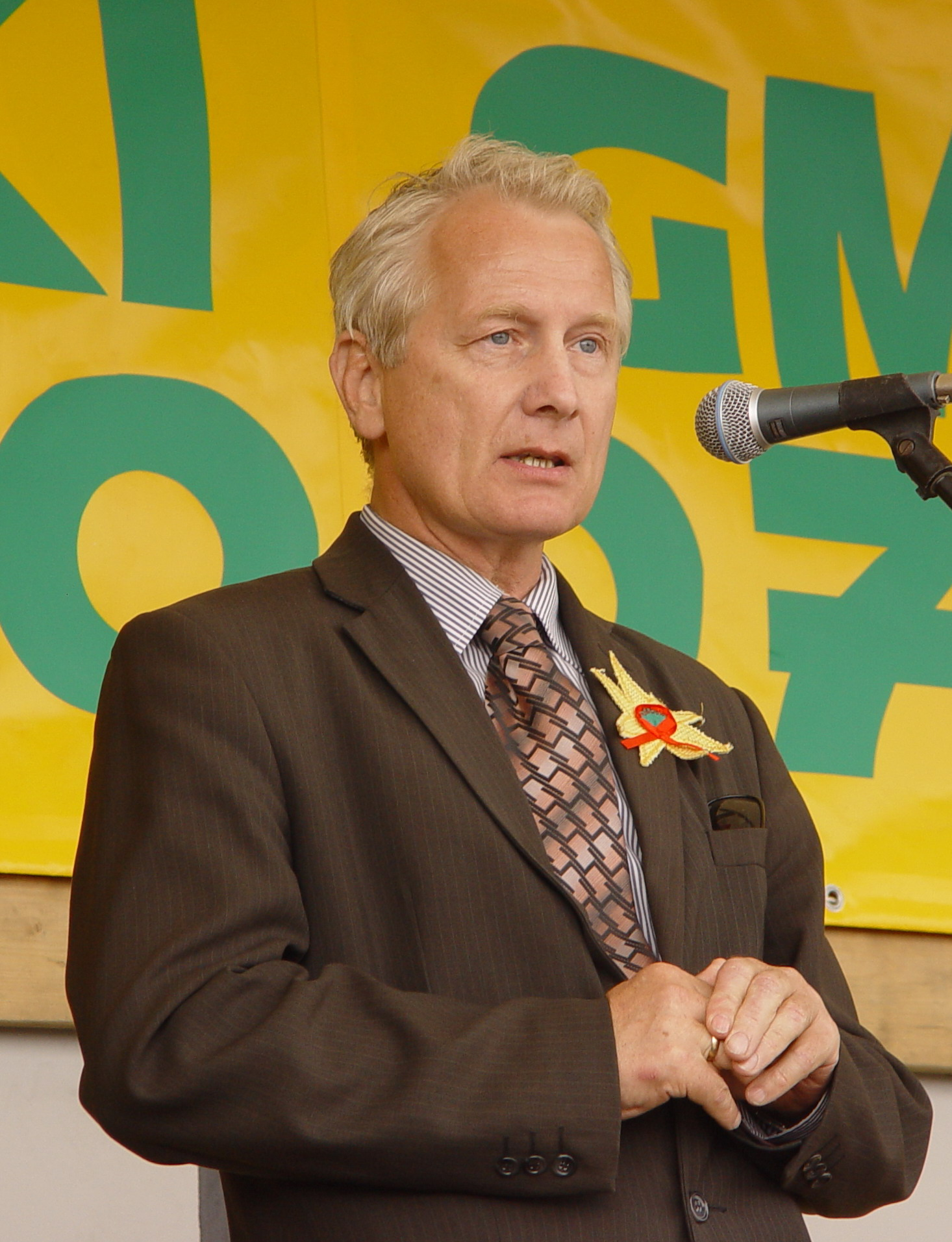
- Miodowicz in 2007

Member of the Sejm
- In office 2005 – 2013
- Succeeded by: Renata Janik
- Constituency: 33 Kielce (2001–2013); 41 Skierniewice (1997–2001)

Personal details
- Born: 9 January 1951 Gniewkowo, Poland
- Died: 23 August 2013 (aged 62) Warsaw, Poland
- Party: Civic Platform
- Other political affiliations: AWS (until 2001)

Konstanty Bronisław Miodowicz (9 January 1951 – 23 August 2013) was a Polish politician. He was a member of Sejm from 1997 until mid-2013, mostly as a candidate from the Civic Platform.

== Biography ==
Miodowicz was born in Gniewkowo. A trained ethnographer, he graduated the Faculty of Philosophy and History at the Jagiellonian University in 1982. He also completed postgraduate studies in didactic methods and pedagogy at the University School of Physical Education in Kraków in 1986.

While in the fourth and fifth terms of the Sejm, starting in July 2004, he was elected to an inquiry commission to investigate Orlengate and questioned several people including Włodzimierz Cimoszewicz.

In May 2013, he collapsed while walking his dog in Busko-Zdrój. He was taken to a hospital where he underwent neurosurgery for a cerebral hemorrhage. He woke from a coma on 6 May. He returned to the hospital later in May for complications from surgery. He never fully recovered and died on 23 August 2013 at the age of 62.

== Honors ==
- 1993: Gold Cross of Merit
- 1995: Knight's Cross

== See also ==
- Members of Polish Sejm 2005-2007
- Members of Polish Sejm 2007-2011
