= Michał Stuligrosz =

Polish politician

Member of the Sejm
- Incumbent
- Assumed office 19 October 2001
- Constituency: 39 – Poznań

Personal details
- Born: 1950 (age 75–76)
- Party: Civic Platform

Michał Stuligrosz (born 17 September 1950 in Poznań) is a Polish politician. He was elected to the Sejm on 25 September 2005, getting 12,659 votes in 39 Poznań district as a candidate from the Civic Platform list.

He was also a member of Sejm 2001-2005.

== See also ==
- Members of Polish Sejm 2005-2007
