= Jerzy Kozdroń =

Polish politician (born 1950)

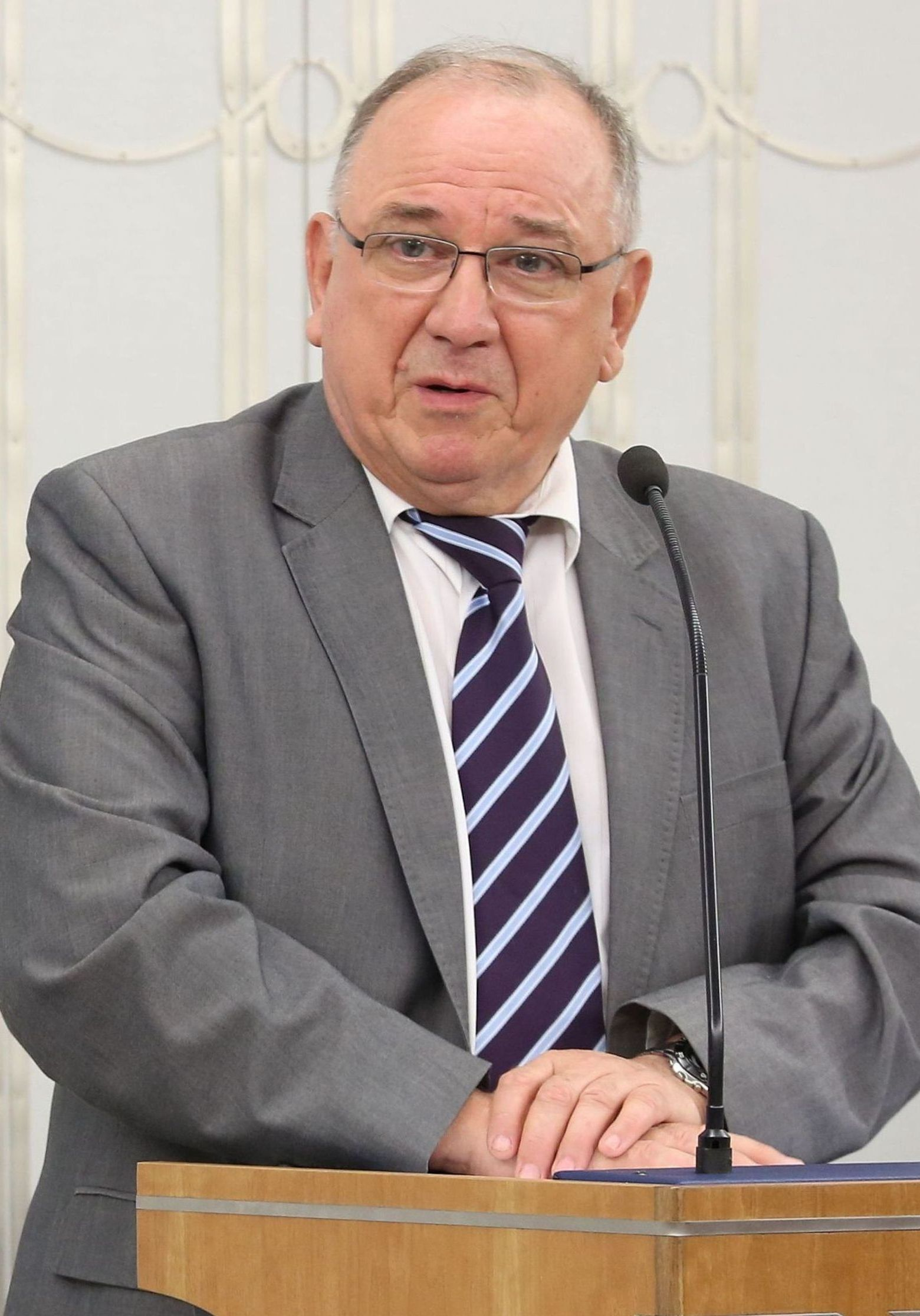

Member of the Sejm
- Incumbent
- Assumed office 25 September 2005
- Constituency: 25 – Gdańsk

Personal details
- Born: 23 October 1950 (age 75)
- Party: Civic Platform

Jerzy Kozdroń (born 23 October 1950 in Mrągowo) is a Polish politician. He was elected to the Sejm on 15 September 2005, getting 3,868 votes in 25 Gdańsk district as a candidate from the Civic Platform list.

== See also ==
- Members of Polish Sejm 2005-2007
