= Danuta Pietraszewska =

Polish politician (born 1947)

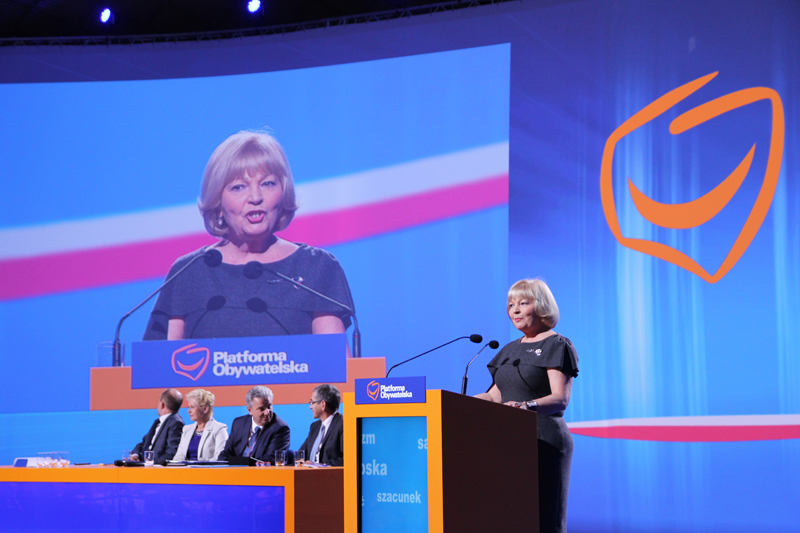

Member of the Sejm
- Incumbent
- Assumed office 25 September 2005
- Constituency: 31 – Katowice

Personal details
- Born: 8 May 1947 (age 78) Ruda Śląska, Poland
- Party: Platforma Obywatelska (Civic Platform)
- Occupation: Politician

Danuta Róża Pietraszewska, née Sitek (born 8 May 1947 in Ruda Śląska, Poland) is a Polish politician. She was elected to the Sejm on 25 September 2005, receiving 9,841 votes in 31 Katowice district, as a candidate from the Platforma Obywatelska (Civic Platform) list.

== See also ==
- List of Sejm members (2005–2007)
