= Stanisław Chmielewski =

Polish politician (born 1958)

Stanisław Marcin Chmielewski

member of Sejm 2005-2007
- In office 25 September 2005 – ?

Personal details
- Born: 23 October 1958 (age 67) Złotów
- Party: Civic Platform

Stanisław Marcin Chmielewski (born 23 October 1958 in Złotów) is a Polish politician. He graduated law in 1981 at Nicolaus Copernicus University in Toruń. He was elected to Sejm on 25 September 2005, getting 3419 votes in 38 Piła district as a candidate from Civic Platform list.

== See also ==
- Members of Polish Sejm 2005-2007
