= Leszek Korzeniowski =

Polish politician

Member of the Sejm
- In office 25 September 2005 – 12 November 2019
- Constituency: 21 – Opole

Personal details
- Born: 1955 (age 70–71)
- Party: Civic Platform

Leszek Korzeniowski (born 1 January 1955, in Warsaw) is a Polish politician. He was elected to the Sejm on 25 September 2005, getting 7,798 votes in 21 Opole district as a candidate from the Civic Platform list.

He was also a member of Sejm 2001–05.

== See also ==
- Members of Polish Sejm 2005–07
