= Tomasz Tomczykiewicz =

Polish politician

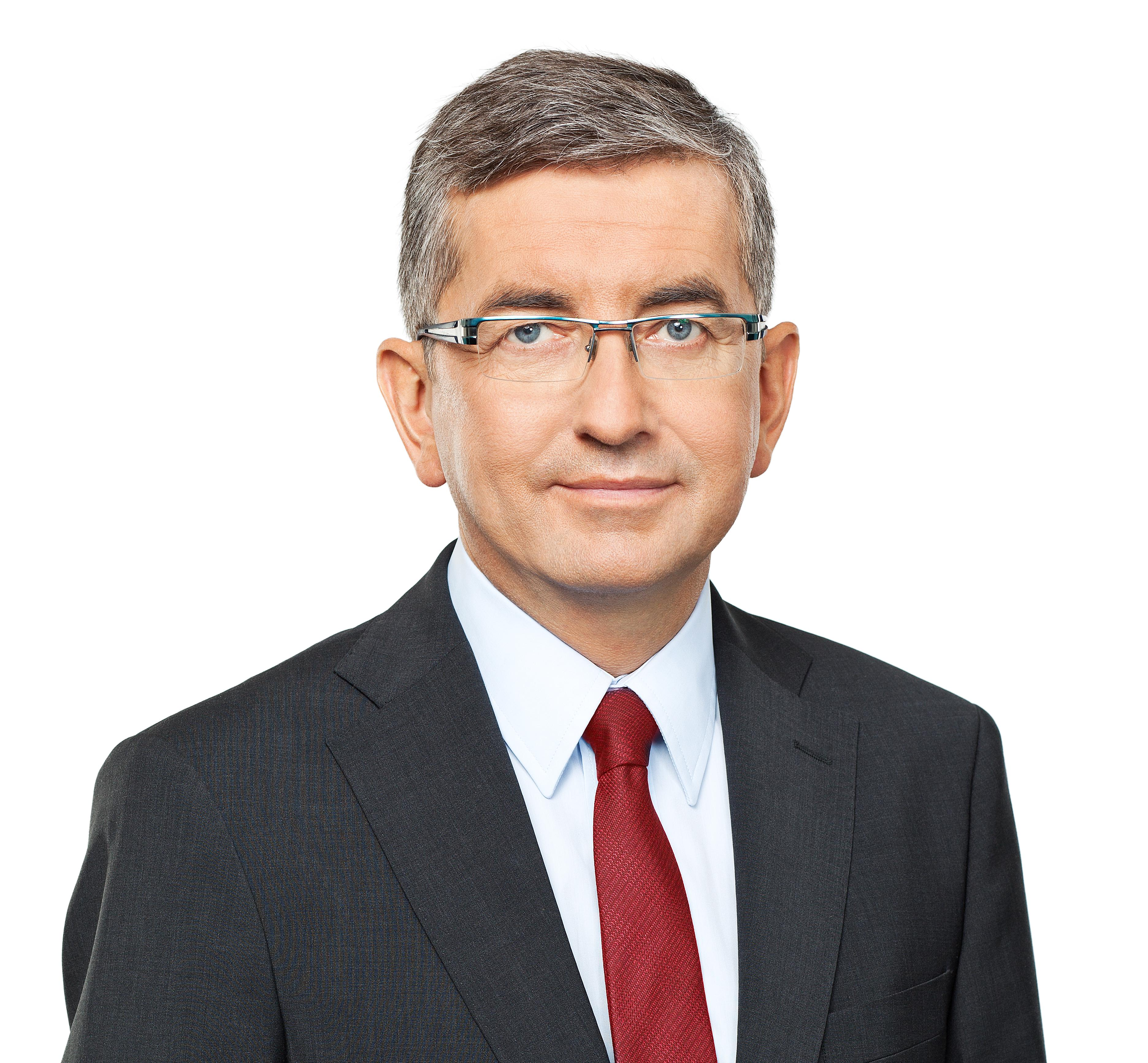

Parliamentary Leader of the Civic Platform 8th Leader of the Civic Platform in the Sejm
- In office 22 July 2010 – 7 November 2011
- Leader: Donald Tusk
- Preceded by: Grzegorz Schetyna
- Succeeded by: Rafał Grupiński

Member of Sejm 4th Parliament • 5th Parliament • 6th Parliament
- In office 19 October 2001 – 28 November 2015

Personal details
- Born: Tomasz Kazimierz Tomczykiewicz; 2 March 1961 Pszczyna, Poland
- Died: 28 November 2015 (aged 54) Katowice, Poland
- Party: Civic Platform
- Children: Maciej Tomczykiewicz

Tomasz Kazimierz Tomczykiewicz (2 March 1961 – 28 November 2015) was a Polish politician. He was elected to the Sejm on 25 September 2005, getting 22,221 votes in 27 Bielsko-Biała district as a candidate from the Civic Platform list, and again in 2015 for the 8th Sejm.

He was also a member of Sejm 2001–2005, Sejm 2005–2007, Sejm 2007–2011. He was admitted to a hospital on 25 November 2015 with a kidney ailment and died three days later.

== See also ==
- Members of Polish Sejm 2005–2007
- Members of Polish Sejm 2007–2011

Party political offices
Preceded by Grzegorz Schetyna	Leader of the Civic Platform in the Sejm; 2010–2011	Succeeded by Rafał Grupiński
