= Mirosław Sawicki =

Polish politician

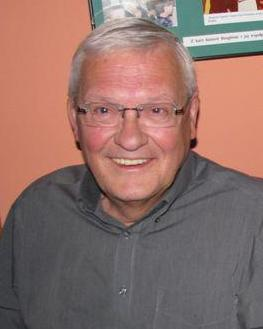
- Portrait of Sawicki in Warsaw, 17 September 2012
- Born: February 10, 1946; Warsaw, Republic of Poland
- Died: January 31, 2016 (aged 69); Warsaw, Republic of Poland
- Resting place: Powązki Military Cemetery
- Occupation: Civil servant
- Political party: Solidarity Citizens' Committee
- Movement: Banana youth
- Spouse: Paula Sawicka
- Parents: Ludwik (father); Czesława née Żochowska (mother)

Minister of National Education and Sport
- In office 2 May 2004 – 1 September 2005
- President: Aleksander Kwaśniewski
- Prime Minister: Waldemar Pawlak until 7 March 1995 Józef Oleksy from 7 March 1995
- Preceded by: Krystyna Łybacka
- Succeeded by: Himself (as Minister of National Education)

Minister of National Education
- In office 1 September 2005 – 31 October 2005
- President: Aleksander Kwaśniewski
- Prime Minister: Józef Oleksy
- Preceded by: Himself (as Minister of National Education and Sport)
- Succeeded by: Michał Seweryński (As Minister of Education and Science)

Mirosław Sawicki (February 10, 1946, Warsaw — January 31, 2016) was a physics teacher, activist and civil servant. The former director of the central examination commission was also the Minister of National Education and Sports in 2004–2005, and Minister of National Education in 2005.

== Biography ==
Beginning in 1954, he was active in the scouting movement as part of Jacek Kuroń's Walter Hufz. He attended the Tadeusz Reytan High School VI in Warsaw. In 1963, he began studying at the Faculty of Physics at University of Warsaw. In 1968, as part of the March events, he took part in a rally at the University of Warsaw in defence of the play Dziady and Adam Michnik and Henryk Szlajfer, who had been expelled from the university. During this time he was associated with the so-called banana youth. At that time he was suspended as a student, which was reinstated in 1970. In 1971 he received his bachelor's degree, and received his master's degree from the Bialystok branch of the University of Warsaw in 1982.

From 1971 to 1990, he was employed as a teacher of physics in Warsaw high schools, including XLI Joachim Lelewel High School. In the second half of the 1970s, he collaborated with the Committee for Social Self-Defense KOR. In 1980, he joined the Independent Self-Governing Trade Union Solidarity, where he headed teams dealing with education. In 1989, he headed the Solidarity Citizens' Committee of Śródmieście, Warsaw.

From 1990 to 1997 he was an official at the Ministry of National Education, serving as director of the Department of General Education (until 1996), then as undersecretary of state at the ministry. From 1998 to 2002 he held the position of Minister Counselor at the Polish Embassy in Washington.

In 2002, he opened his doctoral dissertation at the Department of Sociology at Jagiellonian University. In the same year he won a competition for the post of director of the Central Examination Commission (CKE). On May 2, 2004, he became Minister of National Education and Sports in Marek Belka's first government, a position he retained in the next cabinet. After the separation of the sports ministry, he was Minister of National Education from September 1, 2005, to October 31, 2005. He then returned to heading the CKE, a position he was dismissed from in March 2006. In 2008 he became a member of the National Education Council, an advisory body to Minister Katarzyna Hall. In the same year, he again headed the CKE (as acting director), serving in this position until January 2009, later becoming deputy director of the institution. He was also a member of the Association of Employees, Collaborators and Friends of the Polish Radio Free Europe Broadcasting Station named after Jan Nowak-Jezioranski.

The son of Ludwik and Czesława (née Żochowska). He was the husband of Paula Sawicka.

He was buried in the Powązki Military Cemetery (cemetery section B32-20-5).

== Bibliography ==
The government of Prime Minister Mark Belka. "Government Review." No. 5 (155), May 2004 [accessed 2016-06-09].No page number.
