= Edmund Wittbrodt =

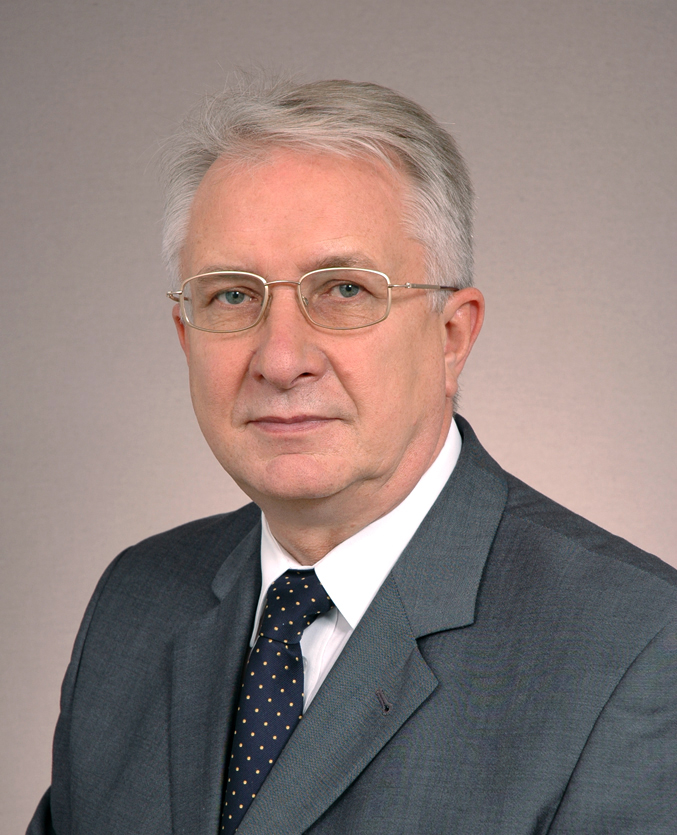
- Wittbrodt during the 50th session of the 8th term Senate

President of the Kashubian-Pomeranian Association
- In office 3 December 2016 – 30 November 2019
- Preceded by: Łukasz Grzędzicki
- Succeeded by: Jan Wyrowiński

Minister of National Education
- In office 20 July 2000 – 19 October 2001
- Preceded by: Mirosław Handke
- Succeeded by: Krystyna Łybacka

Rector of Gdańsk University of Technology
- In office 1990–1996
- Preceded by: Bolesław Mazurkiewicz
- Succeeded by: Aleksander Kołodziejczyk

Personal details
- Born: 16 November 1947 (age 78) Rumia, Poland
- Party: Civic Platform (since 2005)
- Other political affiliations: Solidarity Electoral Action (1997–2001)
- Education: Gdańsk University of Technology
- Occupation: Engineer, academic, politician

Edmund Kazimierz Wittbrodt (born 16 November 1947 in Rumia) is a Polish engineer, academic teacher, and politician. A professor of technical sciences, he served as the minister of national education from 2000 to 2001, and was a senator during the IV, V, VI, VII, and VIII terms. From 2016 to 2019, he was the president of the Kashubian-Pomeranian Association.

== Biography ==
=== Education and scientific activity ===
He attended primary schools in Rumia (No. 1 and No. 5). In 1966, he graduated from the Mechanical-Electrical Technical School in Gdańsk. In 1972, he earned a Master of Engineering degree from the Faculty of Mechanical Technology at Gdańsk University of Technology. He obtained his doctorate in technical sciences in 1974 and his habilitation in 1983. In 1991, he received the title of professor of technical sciences. Professionally associated with the Gdańsk University of Technology, he held the position of ordinary professor. He completed a scientific internship at the University of Wales (United Kingdom) during the 1976–1977 academic year.

He served as the chairman of the Council of Rectors of the Vistula Pomerania and chairman of the Conference of Rectors of Polish Technical Universities. From 1990 to 1996, he was the rector of the Gdańsk University of Technology.

=== Professional and political activity ===
He was a member of "Solidarity", from which he resigned in 2010 to protest the union's endorsement of Jarosław Kaczyński's candidacy in the presidential election. In the 1993 parliamentary elections, he unsuccessfully ran for the Senate on behalf of the Kashubian-Pomeranian Association (ranking 5th out of 15 candidates in his district). In 1997, he was elected senator of the IV term representing Solidarity Electoral Action. He represented the national parliament in the Parliamentary Assembly of the Council of Europe. From 20 July 2000 to 19 October 2001, he served as the minister of national education in the cabinet of Jerzy Buzek.

In subsequent elections, he successfully renewed his mandate as a senator—in 2001 for the V term representing the Senate 2001 Block, and in 2005 for the VI term representing the Civic Platform, which he later joined. From May to July 2004, as a representative of the Senate 2001 Block, he served as a Member of the European Parliament for the V term as part of the national delegation. In the 2007 parliamentary elections, he obtained a senatorial mandate for the fourth time, receiving 244,214 votes. He was appointed to the Chapter for Honorary Titles of Professor of Education.

In 2011, he successfully sought re-election in a new single-member district, receiving 70,345 votes. In 2012, he became the chairman of the Parliamentary Group for the Support of Esperanto (he became an honorary member of the Polish Association Europa-Demokracja-Esperanto). In 2015, Edmund Wittbrodt resigned from running in the next parliamentary elections. On 3 December 2016, he was elected president of the Kashubian-Pomeranian Association. He concluded his term on 30 November 2019. He also took on the role of chairman of the Gdańsk Foundation Council.

== Personal life ==
Son of Antoni (a bricklayer) and Katarzyna (née Kapustina). Since 1968, he has been married to Danuta and has two daughters: Izabela and Agata.

== Decorations and awards ==
- Knight's Cross of the Order of Polonia Restituta (1995)
- Medal of the Commission of National Education
- Johannes Hevelius Scientific Award of the City of Gdańsk (1997)
- Honorary citizen of Rumia (1998)
- St. Adalbert's Medal (2013)
- Gold Medal of the University of Gdańsk "Bene merito et merenti" (2015)
- Grand Cross of Merit of the Order of Merit of the Federal Republic of Germany (Germany, 2016)
- Commander's Cross of the Order of Merit (Hungary, 2016)
- Medal of the Centenary of Independence, an award granted by the mayor of Gdańsk (2018)
- Doctor honoris causa of the University of Gdańsk (2020)
- Medal of the 100th Anniversary of the Society of Friends of Science and Art in Gdańsk, the Gdańsk Scientific Society, and the Gdańsk Society of Friends of Art (2022)
- Honorary Medal "Professor Emeritus of the Gdańsk University of Technology" (2022)
- Honorary citizen of Wejherowo County (2024)
- Honorary Distinction for Services to the Pomeranian Voivodeship (2025)

== Bibliography ==
- "Senator's Biography (VIII term)". senat.gov.pl.
