= Prison notes =

Book by Stefan Wyszyński

Zapiski więzienne (lit. 'prison notes') is a book by a Polish Roman Catholic primate Stefan Wyszyński and was released by Éditions du Dialogue in 1982.

Written on his diary, there are following locations that Cardinal Wyszyński had wrote that the notes from each places are presented which they are found in separate chapters: Rywałd (25 September 1953 – 12 October 1953), Stoczek Klasztorny (12 October 1953 – 6 October 1954), Prudnik (6 October 1954 – 27 October 1955), and Komańcza (27 October 1955 – 26 October 1956).

The book is read in English, German, French, Spanish and Italian.

In the 2021–2022 academic year, Minister of Education and Science Przemysław Czarnek mandated Zapiski więzienne for high schools and technical schools.

== Editions ==
- Zapiski więzienne. Kolekcja „Znaki czasu”, nr 42. Paris: Éditions du Dialogue. 1982. ISBN 2853160351. OCLC 239748090.
- Zapiski więzienne. Bydgoszcz: Arcanum. 1991. ISBN 8385069178. OCLC 23264667.
- Stacja Prudnik : Zapiski więzienne. Poznań: Stowarzyszenie Lednica 2000. 2000. ISBN 9788393641208. OCLC 1150355570.
- Zapiski więzienne. Warszawa: Wydawnictwo im. Stefana Kardynała Wyszyńskiego "Soli Deo". 2007. ISBN 8388202332. OCLC 751059686.
- Audiobook: Zapiski więzienne. Częstochowa: Fundacja "Czas to Miłość". 2012. ISBN 9788363576004. OCLC 1150515572.
