= Prołuż =

- Leader: Alojzy Stanisław Matyniak
- Founded: 12 September 1945
- Headquarters: Krotoszyn
- Membership: 3,000
- Position: Christian democracy National Democracy; Sorbian separatism
- Newspaper: Ratujmy!
- Slogan: Polish Guard over Lusatia! (Polish: Nad Łużycami polska straż!)
- Website: proluz.wordpress.com

Prołuż was a youth organisation founded on 12 September 1945 in Krotoszyn which promoted the culture of Sorbs, a Slavic minority in Germany, and supported the Sorbian independence aspirations following the World War II. It published Ratujmy!, a daily newspaper. The organisation originated from the Polish Lusatian Defence Movement (Polish: Polski Ruch Obrony Łużyc) founded by Poznań historian Alojzy Stanisław Matyniak (1921-1999) and his associates from the Home Army and Grey Ranks. After WW2, the name of this movement was changed to Prołuż, and its headquarters were moved to Poznań. Matyniak was Prołuż's founder and lifetime leader. Prołuż was considered one of the most famous pro-Lusatian organisations.

The organisation became recognisable when, under the Polish People's Republic, the Ministry of Public Security arrested the participants of the Catholic Youth Congress (Polish: Katolicki Zjazd Młodzieży) on 28 May 1949 in Poznań, which included Matyniak. During his brief arrest, Matyniak would propagate Prołuż amongst his inmates, who, coming from various parts of Poland, would founded Prołuż centers throughout Poland after their release; Matyniak himself was released on 29 October 1949. Within a short time, they were established in all major academic centers, and supporter groups were established in smaller towns and high schools. As a result, Prołuż became the largest non-communist organization covering all of Poland, with approximately 3,000 members, 600 of whom were in Poznań. The organization's slogan was: "Polish Guard over Lusatia!"

Prołuż had major following in Poznań, Wrocław, Szczecin, Krotoszyn, Warsaw, and Jarocin. It was initially supported by the Polish communist authorities, who hoped to persuade the Soviet Union to include Lusatia in Poland. To this end, Polish authorities cooperated with Prołuż in promoting the Sorbian cause and ceremonially invited and welcomed Lusatian independence activists such as Jan Cyž to Poland. However, following the Soviet decision to establish the German Democratic Republic, Polish authorities were forced to reverse the course and suppress the movement. It forbade the registation of the organisation in 1949. In the 1950s, East German and Polish had a plan to recruit the leader of Prołuż, Matyniak, as a pro-communist informer and collaborator.

== Ideology ==
According to historian Piotr Pałys, Prołuż had a Christian democratic and National-Democratic (Polish: chadecko-endecki) character. The association's objectives were based on the Statute of the Academic Association of Friends of Lusatia (Polish: Statut Akademickiego Związku Przyjaciół Łużyc) and set out the following tasks:

1. defense of the freedom rights of the Lusatian nation;
2. raising awareness in Poland and abroad about the importance of the Lusatian issue;
3. mutual exchange of cultural goods of the Polish and Lusatian nations;
4. study of Western Slavic issues;
5. awakening the world's vigilance against the German threat.

=== Lusatian question ===
In its Ratujmy! newspaper, Prołuż argued:

Do whatever you can for the Lusatians, because we cannot remain under German rule! It would surely mean our death! The Germanization of our youth continues; our national strength is too weak for us to survive and resist on our own.

Although Prołuż supported Lusatian independence, it entertained four possibilities which were discussed in pro-Lusatian circles. First option called for incorporation of the entirety of Lusatian in Poland, an option that was already promoted by the National Party during WW2. Second option proposed incorporating Sorbian areas into Poland as part of a larger westward shift of Polish border that would include the Polabian territories - this option had famous prononents, such as professor Henryk Batowski. Third option was the establishment of Lusatia as a sovereign state. Lastly, the fourth option called for the creation of a Sorbian protectorate, known as the Lusatian Castellany (Polish: Kasztelania Łużycka) - this option was supported by Bohdan Gębarski and the Polish government; however, Polish authorities could not formally support this in order to avoid tensions with the Soviet Union.

In its official statements, Prołuż declared itself for both the possible Polish incorporation of Lusatia and an independent one. The former was argued as possible given the linguistic and cultural similarities of both nations, geopolitical considerations, and that shifting the Polish border westwards would have pushed the German further West while also extending Polish border with the fraternal Czechoslovakia. At the same time, Prołuż also supported the possibility of Lusatian independence, as well as syncretic options such as a Polish protectorate of Lusatia, which can be seen in the organisation's official motto, “Polish guard over Lusatia!”, as well as its other slogans such as: “After the second Grunwald, a second Bautzen!”

== Development ==
=== Initial growth ===
Unexpectedly, the organization became a real political force in Poland; its members sent petitions regarding the Lusatian issue to the UN and held talks with the Polish government. Thanks to their connections with Karol Świerczewski, they even sent delegates to Lusatia, where they established contacts with members of the Lusatian National Council — Jan Cyž and Pawoł Nedo, who represented the Sorbian people’s aspirations for independence after World War II. As a result of these contacts, the Sorbian Society of Friends of Poland (Polish: Serbołużyckie Towarzystwo Przyjaciół Polski) was established, among other initiatives.

Prołuż also had its own financial resources, which it allocated, among other things, to scholarships and summer camps for Sorbian students and children. There were also plans to establish a Sorbian Institute in Poland. Prołuż’s ideas were promoted at so-called “schadzowanki” modeled after Sorbian student gatherings, where lectures on Sorbian culture and history were combined with entertainment and cabaret. These events featured poetry readings and classical music concerts. At one such event, held in the auditorium of the Collegium Maius at the University of Poznań, Stefan Stuligrosz performed. Prołuż also worked to establish Lusatian classes and places for Lusatian students in Poland and Germany.

In April 1947, the principal of high school in Zgorzelec agreed to Prołuż's proposal to fill the teaching staff with Lusatian teachers. In September 1947, upon Prołuż's urging, Germany handed over the building of former commercial school in Bautzen to Sorbian organisations, which opened a Sorbian school there. In February 1947, Matyniak wrote a letter to Jakub Prawin, the head of the Polish Military Mission in Berlin, asking for permit for Lusatian youth to attend Polish schools and universities on the same conditions as Polish students; Prawin promised to resolve the matter.

=== Government reaction ===
Initially, the Polish communist government supported the pro-Lusatian movement in Poland, and students of Prołuż would receive state scholarships. This was because Polish authorities hoped to include Lusatia in Poland, and treated Prołuż and similar organisations instrumentally as an argument for the inclusion of Sorbian areas in Poland.

In May 1946, Jan Cyž arrived to Krotoszyn to meet with Prołuż members, including Matyniak himself, in order to establish permanent contact. The visit was heavily covered, as the local middle school organized a ceremonial welcome for Cyž. Moreover, the county administrator Leon Kaczmarek was sympathetic to the Lusatian cause, and so the Krotoszyn authorities organized a military parade and a public crowd in the town square to welcome Cyž, who was also welcomed by the representatives of the municipal and county authorities.

In Poznań, Cyž was also welcomed by the city’s vice mayor and a member of the Polish Socialist Party Antoni Drabowicz, along with the Prołuż delegation; Poznań authorities arranged for the traffic on Głogowska street to be halted for Cyž's visit, and houses were decorated with Sorbian flags. A large pro-Sorbian rally took place in the Poznań Wilson Park, and the Sorbian delegate was also welcomed by military and Scout parades.

=== Later developments ===
In mid-1948, the Soviet authorities decided to establish the German Democratic Republic, which ultimately included Lusatia. This dashed Polish hopes for including Lusatia in Poland. The Sorbian National Council was dissolved, and support for the Sorbs’ independence aspirations was ultimately abandoned. In Poland, the communist authorities began persecuting members of Prołuż. Mass arrests and property confiscations followed — Alojzy Matyniak was imprisoned.

In December 1948, the Polish Ministry of National Education forbade the establishment of Prołuż in secondary schools, and in 1949 it denied the registration of the Prołuż Society of Friends of Lusatia. The Ministry of Foreign Affairs condemned the pro-Lusatian movement in Poland in order to avoid diplomatic conflict with the Soviet Union, as the pro-Lusatian movement promoted secession within the Soviet occupation zone of Germany.

In 1950, Treaty of Zgorzelec was signed between the Polish People’s Republic and the German Democratic Republic. In exchange for recognizing the border on the Oder and Lusatian Neisse, the government in Warsaw agreed to cease supporting the Polish diaspora and the Lusatians residing in the Soviet occupation zone of Germany.

In 1954, East German political police Stasi organised a plan to infiltrate Prołuż through Yuri Rjenč, recently released from prison, to establish contact with pro-Lusatian activists in Poland. In cooperation with East German authorities, Polish security detained Fritz Stejnke, who had arrived from West Berlin, on charges of collaborating with French intelligence. Stejnke was then recruited by the authorities to recruit Prołuż leader Matyniak. Matyniak was recommended for recruitment by Polish intelligence by Paweł Dudźik, a former employee of the Polish Military Mission in Berlin.

== Supporting organisations ==
An organization collaborating with Prołuż was the Opole Academic Circle (Polish: Koło Akademików Opolan) in Poznań. Some of its members were Andrzej Rożanowicz, Konrad Poloczek, Janusz Kandziora, and most likely Zdzisław Malczewski, simultaneously held important positions in both organizations.

== Bibliography ==
- Jakub Brodacki, Prołuż Akademicki Związek Przyjaciół Łużyc, Polska Grupa Marketingowa 2006.
