= Lusatian National Council =

The Lusatian National Council (Sorbian languages: Łužiskoserbska narodna rada), also known as the Sorbian National Council, or the Sorb National Council, was a shadow cabinet for a proposed provisional state of Lusatia; it functioned between 1945 and 1948 and represented the independence movement of the Sorbs. It was founded on 27 January 1945 in a joint meeting between two Sorbian organisations, Domowina and the Lusatian National Committee (Sorbian languages: Łužiskoserbski narodny wuběrk), and came to be considered the "executive arm" of Sorbian politics. In October 1945, the council formulated a Sorbian constitution. Its headquarters were located in Budyšin, although it also had an office in Prague, where many of the Lusatian independence activists were located.

The council lobbied for the recognition of the Lusatian cause in the United Nations, requesting Sorbian independence, membership in the United Nations, and recognition of the Lusatian National Council as the government of Sorbia. Its campaign for Sorbian independence intensified in early 1946, with the council writing letters to Joseph Stalin and the Council of People's Commissars of the Soviet Union, and declaring its readiness to cooperate with communist authorities. Its efforts culminated in the Sorbian question being brought up in 1947 German Peace Treaty discussions in London and Moscow, with Yugoslavia agreeing to support Lusatian interests. The council also gained the support of the government officials in Czechoslovakia and Poland. However, despite the Polish, Czechoslovak, and Yugoslav support, Western powers ignored the Sorbs and regarded it as an internal issue of the Soviet zone, while the Soviet Union blocked the proposal and expressed ire at Yugoslavia for supporting it.

Following Soviet refusal, Poland and Czechoslovakia were also pressured to drop their support. Following the 1948 Czechoslovak coup d'état, the Lusatian National Council was dissolved, and Domowina collaborated with the German authorities, agreeing to run on the electoral lists of the Socialist Unity Party of Germany. Recognizing Sorbian collaboration, the German Democratic Republic included a guarantee to the Sorbian people for equal development of their language and culture in the 1949 Constitution of East Germany.

== History ==
=== Foundation ===
By the time of the establishment of the Soviet occupation zone in Germany, Lusatian political groups were separated between four factions. The first group, largest yet most passive, was anti-Soviet, anti-Communist, strongly Catholic and leaned pro-German. The second, represented by Lusatian National Committee (Sorbian languages: Łužiskoserbski narodny wuběrk, LSZNW) was pro-Czechoslovak and open to the Soviets. The third one, led by the Domowina group, was pan-Slavic, pro-Russian, and neutral towards the Soviet Union. The last group was those of Sorbian communists, who were very active yet very few in number, and had no influence amongst the Sorbs. On 27 January 1945, LSZNW and Domowina worked together to found the Lusatian National Council in Prague.

The president of the Lusatian National Council became Jan Cyž, while Jurij Cyž became its general secretary. Already in July 1945, the council would start writing letters to Joseph Stalin and sending delegations to Soviet authorities, lobbying for separation of Lusatia from Germany or optionally rendering it a part of either Poland or Czechoslovakia. The Sorbs were emboldened by Stalin's 1945 speech in which he spoke of the right to self-determination of every Slavic nation.

In May 1945, a Sorbian delegation led by Cyž visited the Soviet military command of Kamenz, who mistook the delegation for Serbs. The delegation then visited the Soviets command of Bautzen instead, led by Ukrainian, who was aware of the Sorbian problem and promised help. As a result, the Soviet administration allowed for registration of Domowina, on 17 May. However, when the Lusatian National Council requested the creation of the Sorbian Socialist Workers' and Peasants' Party, the request was rejected. In July 1945, the council also attempted to found a Lusatian Communist Party (Sorbian languages: Łužiskoserbska komunistiska strona), led by Pawoł Krječmar, Jan Lipič-Chróšćanski, and Jurij Měrćink. The party was to have a national communist character and spoke for annexation of Lusation into Czechoslovakia. However, its registration was ultimately denied by the Soviet authorities.

=== International efforts ===
In early 1946, the council intensified its efforts, and in August 1945 it also moved its headquarters from Prague to Budyšin, and organized elections to its national committee. Police reports of this time speak of enormous hostility between the Sorbs and Germans, with Domowina activists distributing election pamphlets warning of "foreign infiltration of our villages" and calling the local residents to "kill the Germans". The strength of the Lusatian separatist movement during this time was so strong that it attracted the attention of Czechoslovakia, who proposed swapping the Sudeten German population with the Sorbian one in Sudetenland. However, the proposal was rejected.

In October 1946, Václav Moravec and Frico Marac started their activity in Lusatia with the plan to form "Sorbian guerilla" (Sorbian languages: serbske partizanstwo). They were supported by Jana Wjacławk and Pawoła Krječmar, with the former providing them with border passes. They were also provided a vehicle by local members of the council. However, once the news of this activity reached Jan Cyž, he condemned both men, calling guerilla activity a "frivolous game". He would change his mind near his death in summer 1947, after the failure of Sorbian efforts to secure independence, stating that ultimately guerilla activity "was justified".

The same month, the council established contact with the United Nations, requesting becoming a part of the UN, recognition of the Lusatian National Council as the legal government of Lusatia, and a guarantee of the Lusatian independence. The council also attached various maps proposing the borders of the country. Between 1946 and 1947, the council had sent seven memorandums to the United States of America, Soviet Union, Great Britain, and France. None of them were acted upon. However, the council found support in Poland and Czechoslovakia; the Czechoslovak authorities encouraged the council's delegation to visit Czechoslovakia and received with honors. Similarly, in Poland, the council's delegation led by Cyž was warmly welcomed by the authorities of Krotoszyn and Poznań, with a military parade and houses decorated with Sorbian flags. A member of the council, Wojciech Kóčka, was appointed as a special envoy to Poland with rights to make decisions on behalf of the council; he was able to gain significant amount of funds for the Lusatian cause in Poland.

=== Formal contacts ===
In April 1946, the Lusatian National Council achieved a significant advance towards international recognition by meeting with Zygmunt Modzelewski, the Polish Deputy Minister of Foreign Affairs, who agreed to speak to Jurij Cyž. Cyž asked on behalf of the council for the Polish government to intervene in Moscow by recommending the Soviets to receive a Sorbin delegation, speak out against the formation of a central German government, and to support the initiative to establish the Sorbian Socialist Party. Modzelewski stated that while the Polish government independently speaking in support of the council could be seen as provocative, Poland would support the already ongoing Czechoslovak initiative in support of either an independent or non-German Lusatia. Modzelewski also stated that Sorbian literature and Sorbian schools would be allowed in Poland. However, Poland also demanded that the council would not claim any territories east of the Lusatian Neisse. This was accepted by the coucil, who formally endorsed Polish border on Oder-Neisse.

Following the Polish meeting, the council also secured the support of Yugoslavia, who in spring 1946 recommended the Soviet Union to receive a delegation of the Lusatian National Council. Yugoslav military mission to Germany praised the Sorbian movement as "progressive" and requested the Soviets to help their cause. In summer 1946, the council then met with Soviet ambassador in Paris, Aleksandr Bogomołow, who promised to inform Moscow and the Soviet administration of East Germany of the Lusatian postulates. Bogomołow kept his word, as in late 1946, Soviet government discussed and decided on the matter. Soviet Union believed that stripping Germany of Lusatia would weaken the position of German communists in light of the Soviet ambition of forming neutral united Germany, and it was also believed that such a move would also provoke France to act on its own ambition to annex the Saar Protectorate, something that Moscow vehemently opposed.

However, the final decision of the Soviet Union to oppose Sorbian ambitions was the memorandum that the Lusatian National Council sent to the Allies on 5 November 1946, where it demanded that the Western powers adopt Sorbian demands. The Soviets saw the council's messages to Western powers as provocative and double-faced, and let the representatives of Poland, Czechoslovakia, and Yugoslavia know that they saw this move as hostile. Ivan Serov, who personally favored the Sorbian cause, stated that the council's decision to send the memorandum to the West was "a great folly that could ruin everything for the Sorbs". Thus, Moscow decided against independent or Slavic Lusatia, and denounced Jurija Cyž as "an enemy of the Soviet Union". At the same time, they informed German communists to permit cultural autonomy causes such as providing the Sorbs with their own schools and press.

=== Failure ===
Later in 1946, a conflict developed between the council and Domowina, with the former pressing for political independence, and the latter settling for cooperation with the emerging communist authorities of East Germany. By the autumn of 1946, Domowina joined forces with the SED and agreed to join the SED's electoral lists for local and state elections. This split the Lusatian independence movement, and alienated Sorbs linked to Christian Democrats and liberals instead. By December 1946, the split escalated to the point of Domowina members being excluded from the council's delegation, and a result, the first post-war All-Slav Conference on 4 December 1946 was attended by two Lusatian delegations, one of the Lusatian National Council, and the other of Domowina. According to Krzysztof R. Mazurski, the political split between pan-Slavic and pro-German factions greatly limited the success of the movement.

Nevertheless, Yugoslavia was supportive of the Lusatian cause, and agreed to represent its interests in the 1947 German Peace Treaty conference in Moscow. Support was also expressed by Poland and Czechoslovakia, and a Czechoslovak memorandum on the creation of an independent Lusatia was placed before the Moscow foreign ministers' conference. The conference lasted from March to April 1947 and ended in a failure for Yugoslavia. Despite Yugoslav support, Soviet Union was dismissive of the Lusatian cause and blocked any further discussion of it at subsequent meetings. Western powers present at the conference ignored the Sorbian question, regarding it as an internal Soviet affair. As such, the Soviet Union "put pressure on its satellites not to support Sorbian claims and expressed its anger at Tito’s support for the Sorbs." Because of this, the Czechoslovak memorandum went undiscussed.

=== Dissolution ===
Following the failure of the Moscow conference, hostility between Domowina and the National Council grew, with the former denouncing the latter as "reactionary" given its refusal to cooperate with German authorities and for its demands of expulsion of Germans from the Sorbian area. However, by the end of 1947, both Jan Cyž and Jurij Cyž died, and the 1948 Czechoslovak coup d'état led to dissolution of the council in February 1948. By October 1947, Domowina was recognized as the sole representative of Sorbian interests.

Recognizing Domowina as the only legal body of the Sorbian community, the Soviets allowed it to published Nowa Doba newspaper, and in 1948, Domowina's submission towards communist authorities was rewarded by the Saxon Parliament adopting an act guaranteeing the Sorbs "legal protection and state patronage for its language, cultural activities and development", as well as allowing Sorbian to be taught in schools and used in public offices. Domowina's efforts also resulted in the guarantee to the Sorbian people for equal development of their language and culture being included in the 1949 Constitution of East Germany.

According to historians Eleonore Breuning, Jill Lewis and Gareth Pritchard, "the Soviets, though in some ways sympathetic to the Sorbian cause, did not consider any further border changes to be in their great-power interests". Ultimately, the political conflict that emerged between Stalin and Tito in 1948 led the Lusatian organisations to be viewed by increasing suspicion by the Soviet authorities, given their ties with the Yugoslav "revisionists". Meanwhile, Yugoslavia maintained a Sorbian liaiso officer at its Berlin Military Mission, and promoted the idea that Sorbs and Serbs were related.

== Program ==
Initially, the Lusatian National Council promoted the idea of incorporating Lusatia into Czechoslovakia, a view common amongst Sorbs in 1919 for which they lobbied for at the Paris Peace Conference. However, by January 1946 this view was changed in favor of adopting a flexible stance that generally favored independent Lusatia. In its dispatches to the United Nations, Soviet Union and Western powers, the council advanced several different ideas, which, apart from independence, also proposed incorporating Lusatia into Poland or Czechoslovakia, or designing it a protected autonomous region. The council did not claim Sorbian territories east of the Lusatian Neisse, and instead recognized the Polish Oder-Neisse border.

In June 1945, the council wrote to Edvard Beneš and Joseph Stalin: "For hundreds of years the Lusatians have seen nothing good from the Germans […] It is no wonder, then, that the nation today has but one wish: that they should never again in the future be under the domination of the Germans who have shown nothing but enmity." Aside from pleas not to be included in Germany or to at least gain autonomy, the council also called for the establishment of Sorbian schools, land reform, and homecoming of Sorbs exiled by the Nazi government. The Soviet land reform, which confiscated all farm land either over 100 hectares or held by war criminals or Nazis and divided it, was heavily supported by the council, as the redistribution favored the hitherto impoverished Sorbs.

== See also ==
- Prołuż
