= Anna Zalewska =

Polish politician (born 1965)

Anna Zalewska MEP
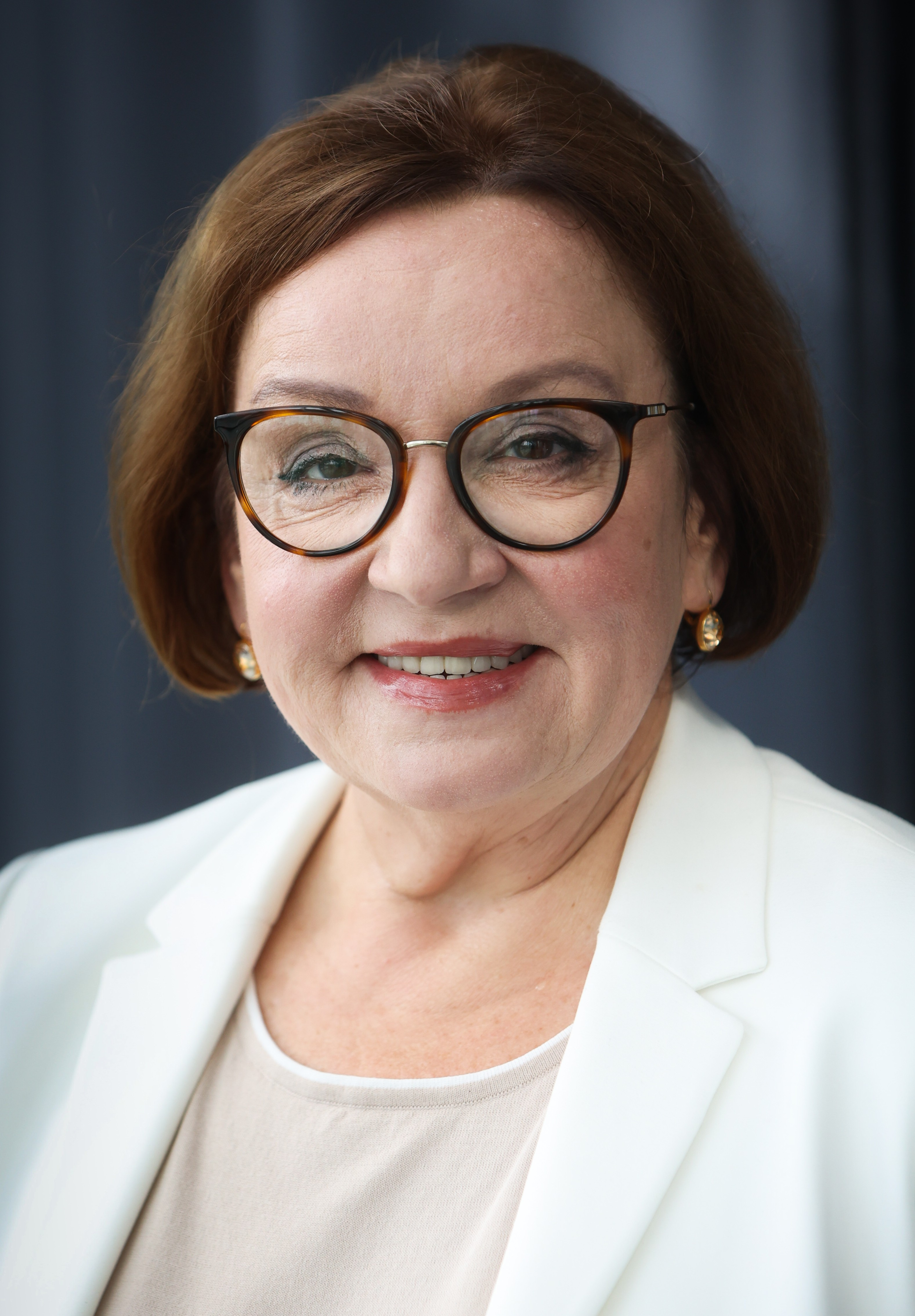
- Zalewska in 2023

Minister of National Education
- In office 16 November 2015 – 4 June 2019
- Prime Minister: Beata Szydło; Mateusz Morawiecki
- Preceded by: Joanna Kluzik-Rostkowska
- Succeeded by: Dariusz Piontkowski

Member of the European Parliament for Lower Silesian and Opole
- Incumbent
- Assumed office 2 July 2019

Personal details
- Born: 6 July 1965 (age 61) Świebodzice, Poland
- Party: Law and Justice
- Education: University of Wrocław
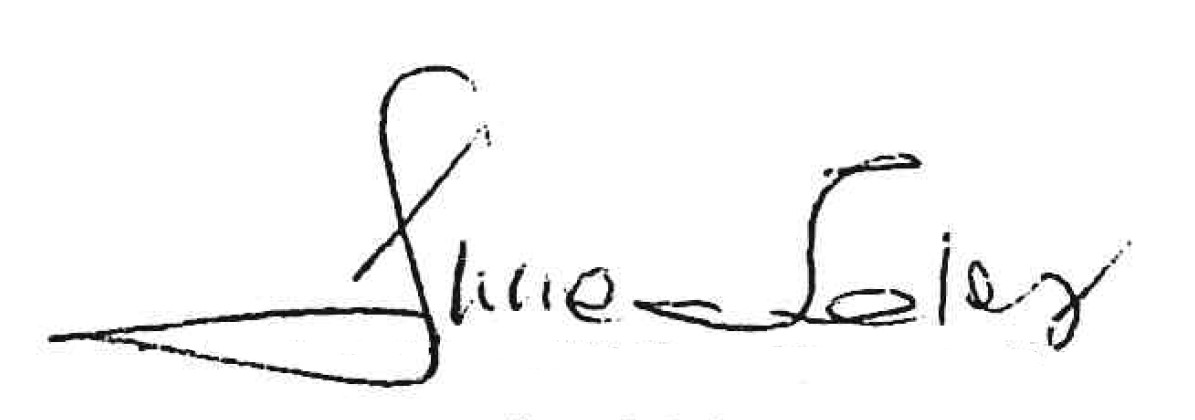
- Signature

Anna Elżbieta Zalewska (née Gąsior; born 6 July 1965) is a Polish politician, and former Minister of National Education, serving 2015 to 2019. Since 2007, Zalewska has been a Member of the Sejm and she has worked there until a transition to the minister.

== Life ==
Zalewska graduated from the Polish Philology Department of the University of Wrocław in 1989. She also finished post-graduate studies in environment protection, organization and management of the education system, and pedagogical supervision in her alma mater. She first worked as teacher and deputy director of the Świebodzice High School.

She joined liberal, democratic political party Freedom Union and subsequently moved to Law and Justice founded by Lech and Jarosław Kaczyński in 2001. From 2002 to 2007, Zalewska sat on the provincial council of the Świdnica County, and since 2006, served a second function of deputy starosta in the same office. She ran for Parliament first in 2005, but unsuccessfully. In 2007 Polish parliamentary election, she was elected Member of Sejm from a list of the Law and Justice Party. She ran in the Wałbrzych electoral district and won with 10,584 votes. In 2011, she was re-elected to Parliament in the same electoral district with 14,999 votes. In 2009 and 2014, she unsuccessfully ran for the European Parliament. In 2015, she was re-elected to Polish Parliament Sejm, winning 22,402 votes. On 16 November 2015, she was appointed Minister of Education in the acting government of Beata Szydło.

During her term of office as Minister of Education, in April 2019 there was a nationwide strike which lasted for 19 days in 78% of schools which had conducted the strike ballot. The strike ended with the agreement of the parties.
