= Ryszard Legutko =

Polish politician (born 1949)

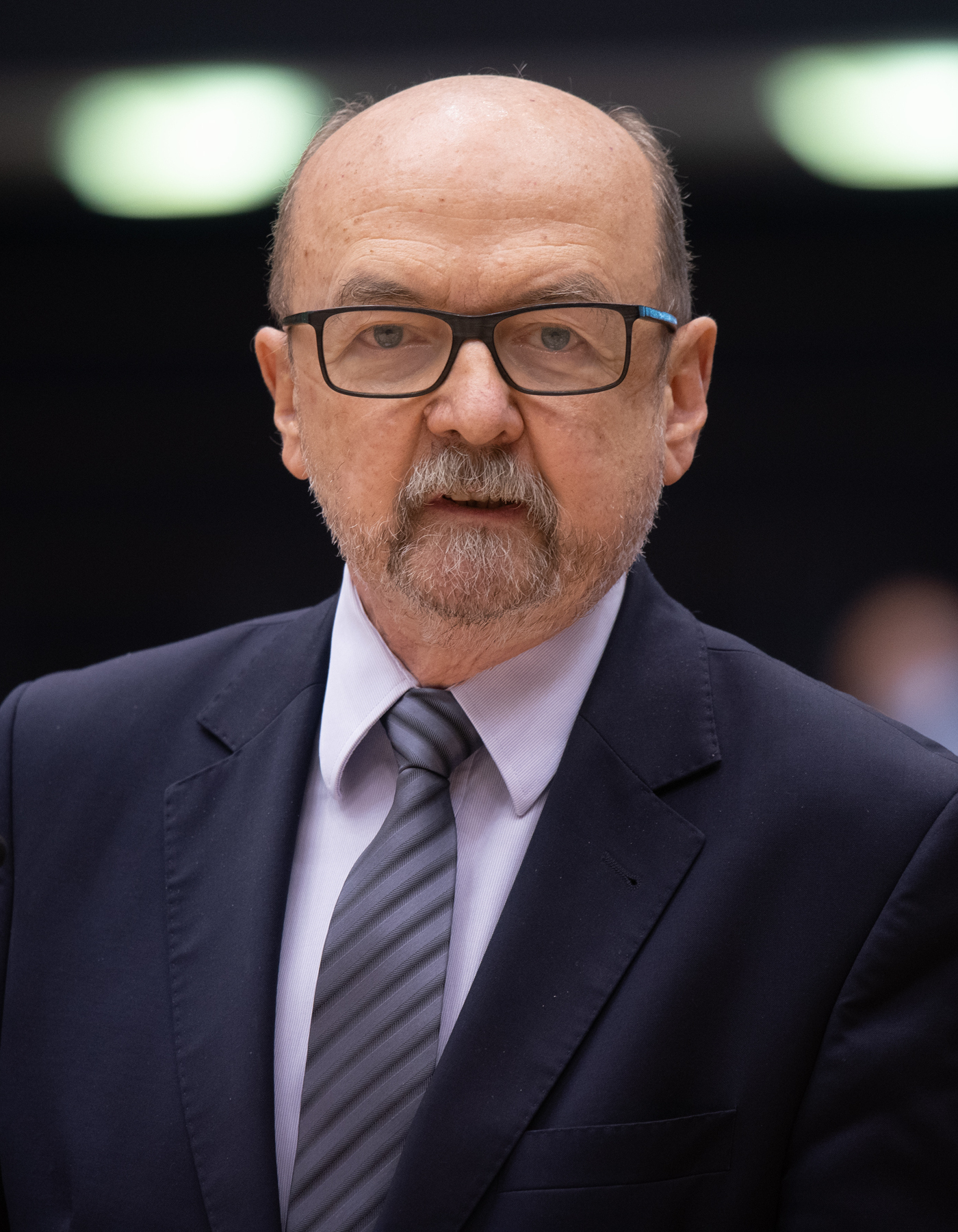
- Legutko in 2020

Co-chairman of the European Conservatives and Reformists Head of the Polish Law and Justice Delegation to the European Parliament
- Incumbent
- Assumed office 11 December 2011
- Serving alongside: Jorge Buxadé

Minister of National Education
- In office 13 August 2007 – 16 November 2007
- President: Lech Kaczyński
- Prime Minister: Jarosław Kaczyński
- Preceded by: Roman Giertych
- Succeeded by: Katarzyna Hall

Member of the European Parliament for Lesser Poland and Świętokrzyskie
- In office 1 July 2014 – 1 July 2024

Member of the European Parliament for Lower Silesian and Opole
- In office 14 July 2009 – 2 July 2014

Personal details
- Born: 24 December 1949 (age 76) Kraków, Poland
- Party: Law and Justice
- Children: 2
- Education: Jagiellonian University
- Occupation: Politician, philosopher
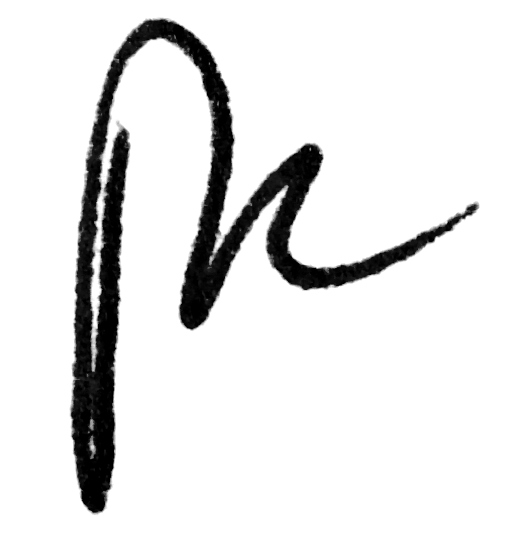
- Signature
- Website: www.rlegutko.pl

Ryszard Antoni Legutko (Polish pronunciation: [ˈrɨʂart anˈtɔɲi lɛˈɡutkɔ]; born 24 December 1949) is a Polish philosopher and politician. He is a professor of philosophy at the Jagiellonian University in Kraków, specializing in ancient philosophy and political theory. A member of the right-wing Law and Justice party domestically, Legutko has also served as a Member of the European Parliament from 2009 to 2024 being a prominent member of the minority European Conservatives and Reformists political group.

== Biography ==
Under communism he was one of the editors of the samizdat quarterly "Arka". After the collapse of the communist regime he co-founded the Centre for Political Thought, which combines research, teaching, seminars and conferences and is also a publishing house. He has translated and written commentaries to Plato's Phaedo (1995), Euthyphro (1998) and Apology (2003). He is the author of several books: Plato's Critique of Democracy (1990), Toleration (1997), A Treatise on Liberty (2007) and An Essay on the Polish Soul (2008), Socrates (2013).

In 2005 he was elected to a seat in the Polish Senate (representing the Law and Justice Party), where he became Deputy Speaker. In 2007 he was Poland's Education Minister, and in 2007–9 Secretary of State in the Chancellery of President Lech Kaczyński. He is currently a member of the European Parliament, where he sits on the Foreign Affairs Committee, a head of the Polish Law and Justice Delegation to the European Parliament and a Co-chairman of the Conservatives and Reformists parliamentary group.

Sued in 2010 for violation of personal rights by calling students who demanded removal of Christian symbols from a public school "unruly brats spoiled by their parents", he asked for a dismissal of the case based on his immunity as a member of European Parliament. In 2011 the court denied that request. Plaintiffs are represented by an attorney on a pro-bono basis under the Precedential Cases Program of the Helsinki Foundation for Human Rights. He lost this case.

He is a fellow of Collegium Invisibile as a professor of philosophy.

== Views ==
Legutko said in 2014 that same-sex marriage is an "unnecessary, destructive experiment." He has argued that "homophobia" is "a stick with which you beat people who dare to raise any kind of objection" and "a totally fictitious problem" and claimed that "Christians are the group that have been most discriminated against". He has described dressing as priests and nuns in gay pride demonstrations as "aggressive, anti-Christian and shocking".

== Lecture at Middlebury College ==
The Alexander Hamilton Forum at Middlebury College in Vermont, USA, invited Legutko to give a lecture on his book The Demon in Democracy on 17 April 2019. In response, an online protest letter by Middlebury College students and faculty urged the college to cancel the invitation, citing Legutko's views on homosexuality, race, and religion. Keegan Callanan, director of the Alexander Hamilton Forum, urged those who were critical of Legutko's views to attend the lecture and debate him. Student activists planned to hold "a celebration of queer identity" outside the lecture venue, with placards, pamphlets, music and a dance party. An organizer of the protest said there was strictly no attempt to stop Legutko from speaking. Hours before the lecture was scheduled to take place, college administration cancelled it, saying they did not have the staff capacity to ensure the security and safety of both the lecture and the protest event. The Alexander Hamilton Forum said that it would invite him again in the future, and a Middlebury spokesperson indicated the college was open to that.

== Bibliography ==
=== Books ===
- Legutko, Ryszard (1990). Plato's Critique of Democracy.
- ——— (1993). Nie lubię tolerancji : szkice i felietony [I Don't Like Tolerance: Sketches and Columns].
- ——— (1997). Toleration.
- ——— (2007). A Treatise on Liberty.
- ——— (2008). An Essay on the Polish Soul.
- ——— (2013). Socrates.
- ——— (2016). The Demon in Democracy: Totalitarian Temptations in Free Societies [Polish title: "Triumf Człowieka Pospolitego" ("Triumph of the Common Man")]. ISBN 978-1-59403863-1.
- ——— (2020). Why I Am Not a Liberal.
- ——— (2021). The Cunning of Freedom: Saving the Self in an Age of False Idols.

=== Essays and reporting ===
- Legutko, Ryszard (January–February 2016). "Letter from Warsaw". Quadrant. 60 (1–2): 70–72.
