= Józef Borzyszkowski =

Polish historian (born 1946)

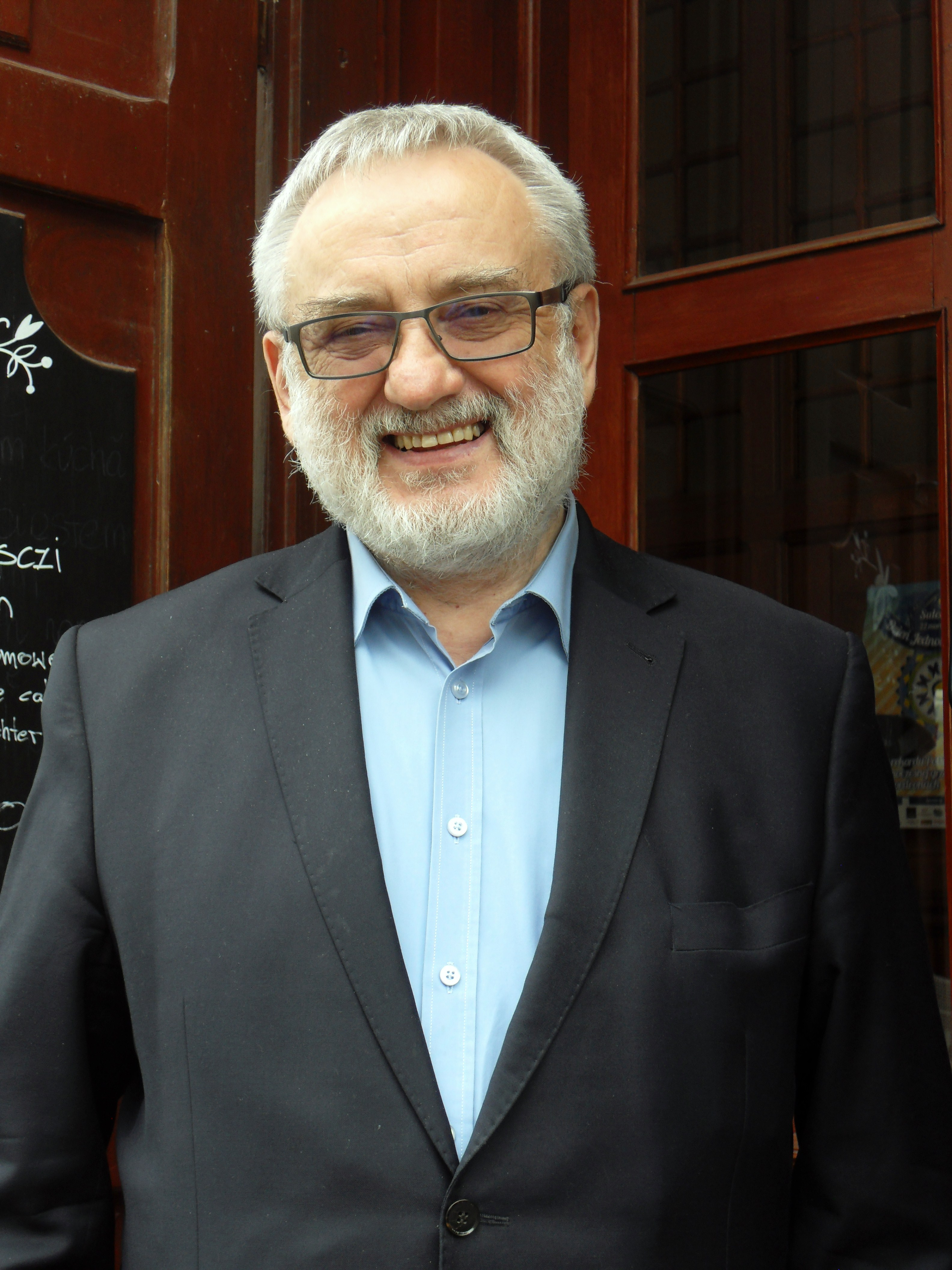
Portrait of Borzyszkowski, 2015

Józef Borzyszkowski (Kashubian: Józef Bòrzëszkòwsczi; born 1946) is a Polish historian, professor of history at Gdańsk University, and Kashubian activist, who served as chairman of the Kashubian-Pomeranian Association from 1986 to 1992.

He was a senator of the Senate of Poland from 1991 to 1993.

== Sources ==
- "Józef Borzyszkowski". Information Processing Centre database (in Polish).
- Senate of Poland
- (German language website)

== Bibliography ==
- Obracht-Prondzyński, C.: The Kashubs today: culture, language, identity [translated by Tomasz Wicherkiewicz].Gdańsk: Instytut Kaszubski, 2007; ISBN 978-83-89079-78-7
