= Krystyna Szumilas =

Polish politician (born 1956)

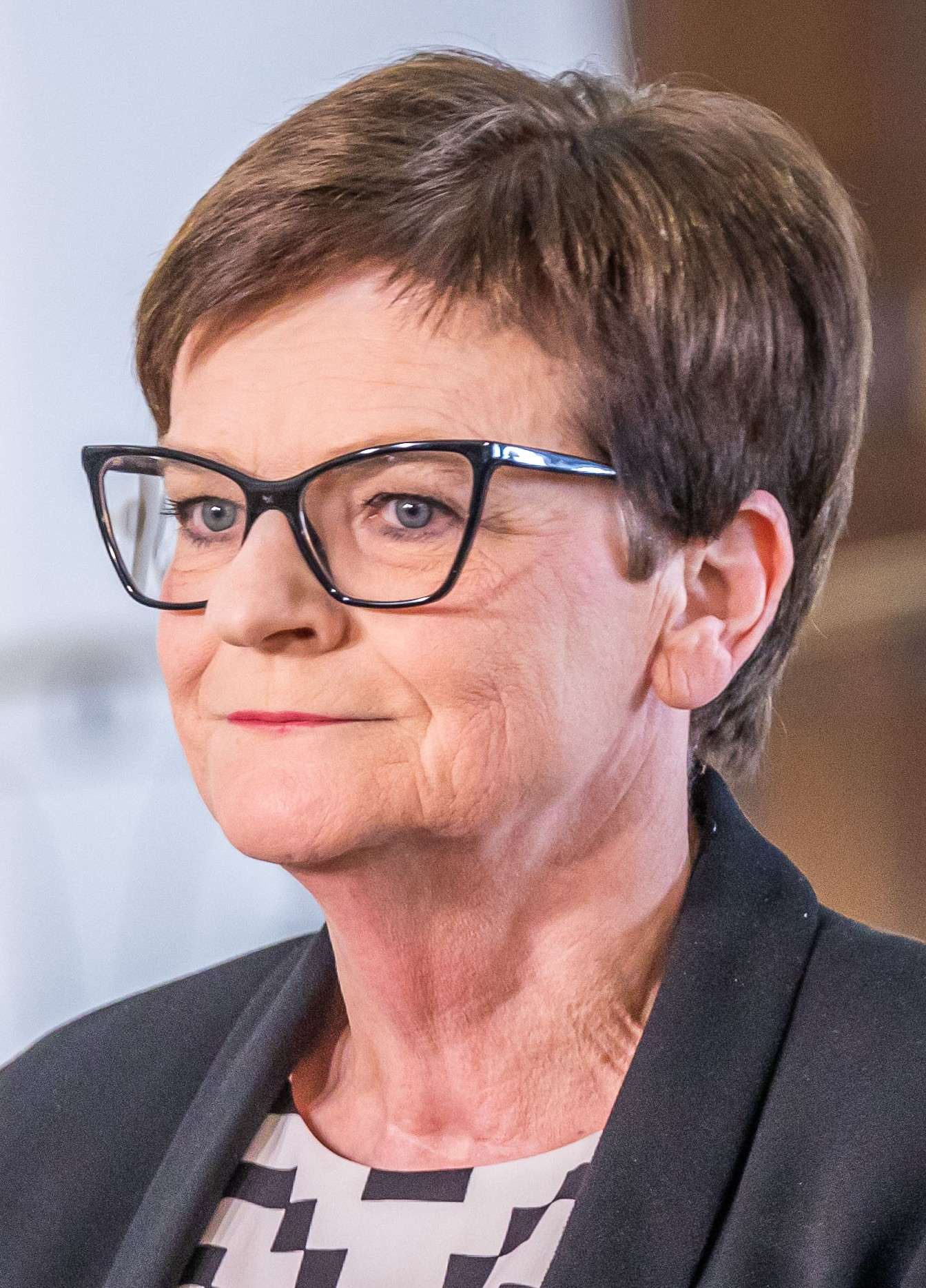
- Krystyna Szumilas (2023)

Minister of National Education
- In office 18 November 2011 – 27 November 2013
- President: Bronisław Komorowski
- Prime Minister: Donald Tusk
- Preceded by: Katarzyna Hall
- Succeeded by: Joanna Kluzik-Rostkowska

Personal details
- Born: 28 June 1956 (age 69) Knurów
- Party: Civic Platform

Krystyna Maria Szumilas (born 28 June 1956 in Knurów) is a Polish politician. She was elected to the Sejm on 25 September 2005 getting 16,105 votes in 29 Gliwice district as a candidate from the Civic Platform list. From 2011 to 2012 she served as the Minister of National Education.

She was also a member of Sejm 2001-2005.

== See also ==
- Members of Polish Sejm 2005-2007
