= Aleksander Arendt =

Polish army officer & activist (1912–2002)

Aleksander Arendt (6 December 1912, in Będargowo – 1 January 2002) was an activist of the Kashubians and Pomeranians (ethnic groups in northern Poland). He was the president of Kashubian-Pomeranian Association from 1956, until 1959.
