= Bernard Szczęsny =

Polish activist

Bernard Szczęsny (27 October 1919 – 19 December 1993), was an activist of the Kashubians and Pomeranians (ethnic groups in northern Poland). He was born in Berlin and was the president of Kashubian-Pomeranian Association in years 1959–1971.
