= Ministry of National Education (Poland) =

- Ministerstwo Edukacji Narodowej
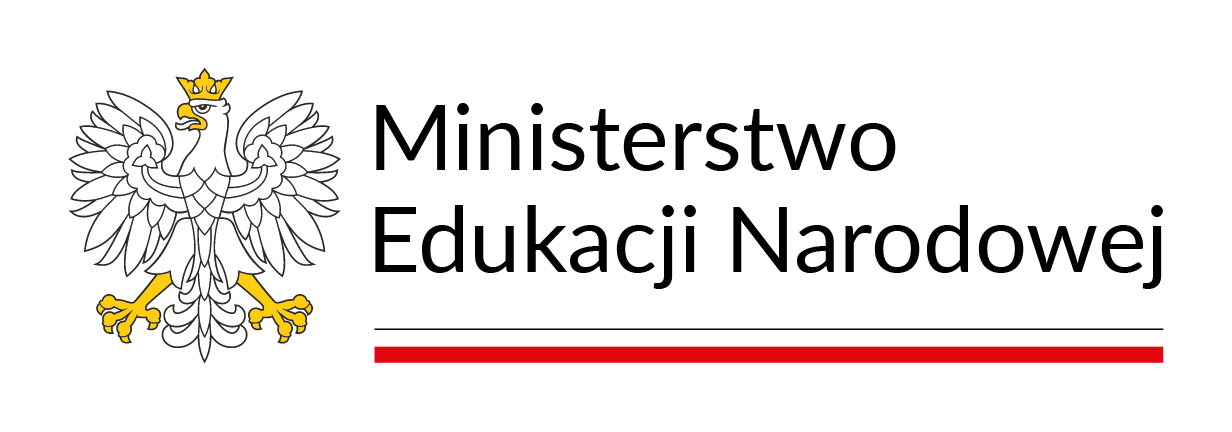
- Ministerial logotype

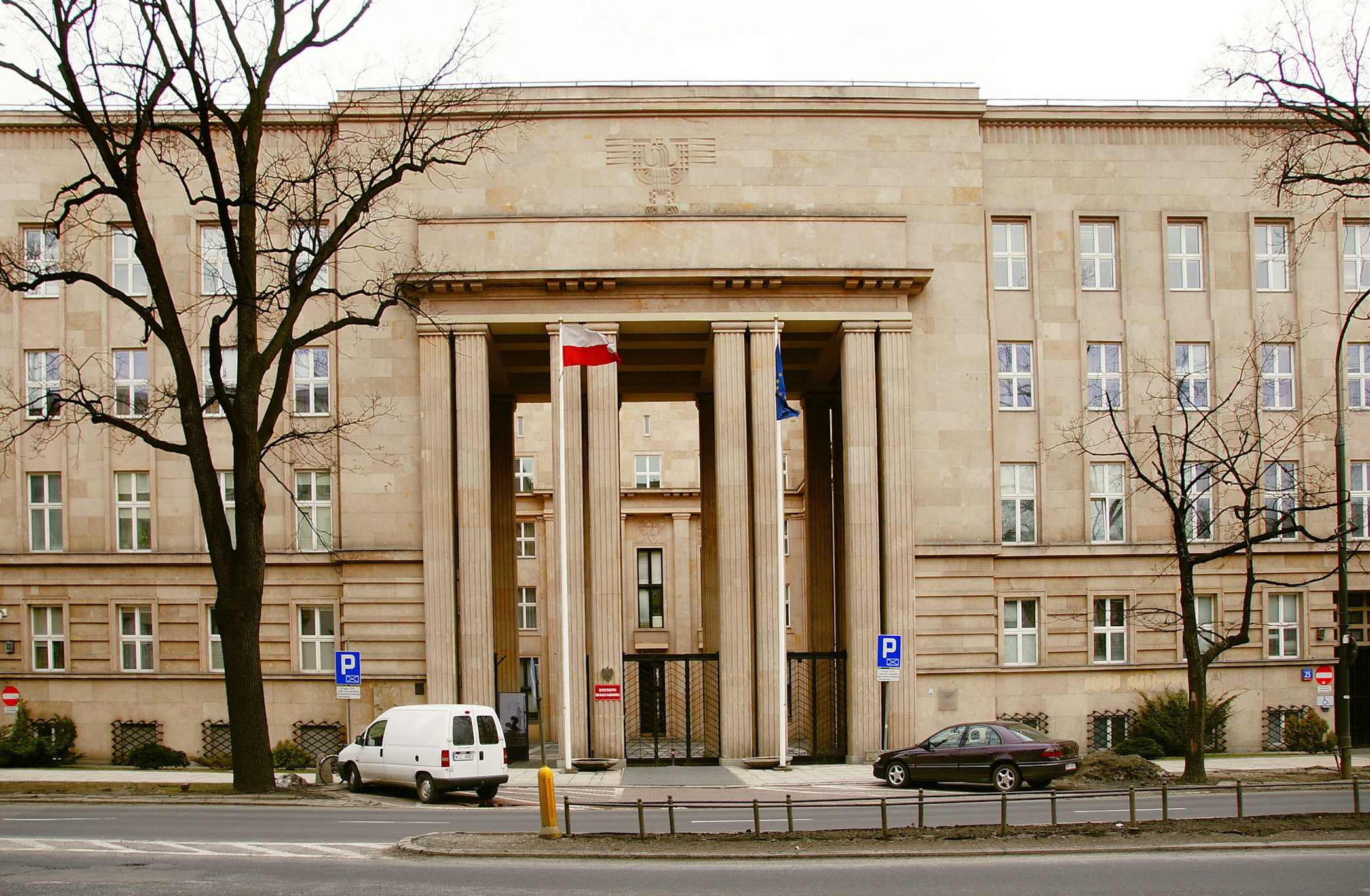
- Seat of the ministry

Agency overview
- Preceding agency: Ministry of Religious Affairs and Public Education
- Headquarters: Al. J. Ch. Szucha 25, Warsaw
- Agency executive: Barbara Nowacka, Minister of National Education
- Parent agency: Council of Ministers
- Website: gov.pl/web/edukacja

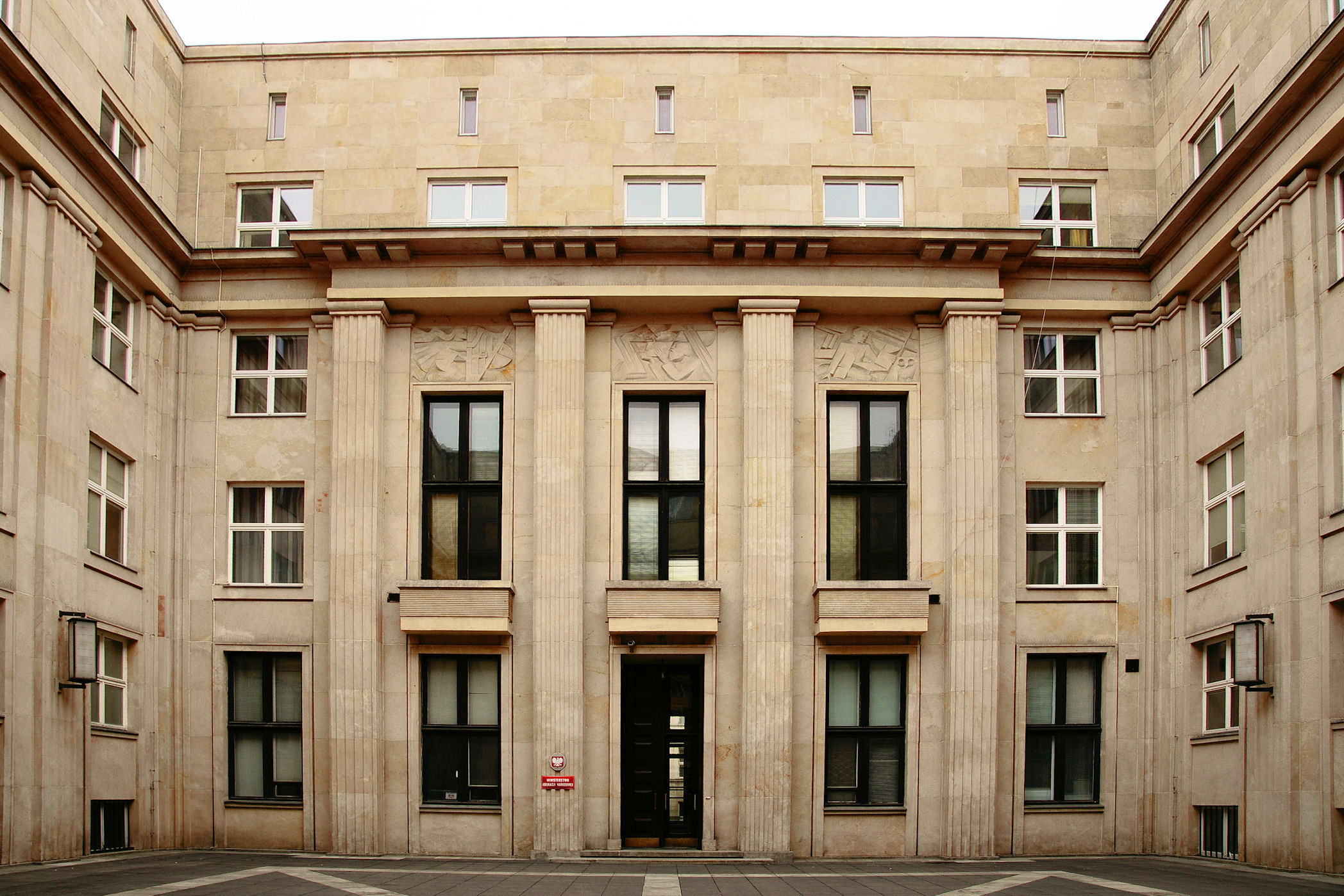
Inside the ministry's main courtyard

The Ministry of National Education (Polish: Ministerstwo Edukacji Narodowej [mi.ɲisˈtɛr.stfɔ ɛ.duˈka.t͡sji na.rɔˈdɔ.vɛj], MEN) is a ministerial department of the government of Poland, established on 1 January 2024 after being separated from the Ministry of Education and Science. The ministry's prerogatives include setting educational standards and youth activities. It does not oversee higher education, which falls under Ministry of Science and Higher Education. The two were created in May 2006 by splitting the Ministry of Education and Science. In January 2021, the two were merged, only to be separated again in 2024.

The ministry, established in 1944, succeeded the pre-war Ministry of Religious Affairs and Public Education.

== Headquarters ==
The seat of the ministry is the former building of the Ministry of Religious Affairs and Public Education in Warsaw. The building was constructed in the years 1925-1930 according to the design of Zdzisław Mączeński.

== List of ministers ==
=== Ministers of Education ===
- Stanisław Skrzeszewski (PPR) 31 December 1944 – 28 June 1945 (PKWN)
- Czesław Wycech (ZSL) 28 June 1945 – 5 February 1947
- Stanisław Skrzeszewski (PZPR) February 1947 – 7 July 1950
- Witold Jarosiński (PZPR) 7 July 1950 – 4 August 1956
- Feliks Baranowski (PZPR) 11 September 1956 – 13 November 1956
- Władysław Bieńkowski (PZPR) 13 November 1956 – 27 October 1959
- Wacław Tułodziecki (PZPR) 27 October 1959 – 11 November 1966

=== Ministers of Education and Higher Education ===
- Henryk Jabłoński (PZPR) 11 November 1966 – 28 March 1972

=== Ministers of Education and Behavior ===
- Jerzy Kuberski (PZPR) 29 March 1972 – 8 February 1979
- Józef Tejchma (PZPR) 8 February 1979 – 2 April 1980
- Krzysztof Kruszewski (PZPR) 3 April 1980 – 12 February 1981
- Bolesław Faron (PZPR) 12 February 1981 – 6 November 1985
- Joanna Michałowska-Gumowska (PZPR) 12 November 1985 – 23 October 1987

=== Ministers of National Education ===
- Henryk Bednarski (PZPR) 23 October 1987 – 14 October 1988
- Jacek Fisiak (PZPR) 14 October 1988 – 1 August 1989
- Henryk Samsonowicz (NSZZ Solidarność) 12 September 1989 – 14 December 1990
- Robert Głębocki (KLD) 12 January 1991 – 5 December 1991
- Andrzej Stelmachowski (no party) 23 December 1991 – 5 June 1992
- Zdobysław Flisowski (no party) 11 July 1992 – 26 October 1993
- Aleksander Łuczak (PSL) 26 October 1993 – 1 March 1995
- Ryszard Czarny (SdRP) 4 March 1995 – 26 January 1996
- Jerzy Wiatr (SdRP) 15 February 1996 – 17 October 1997
- Mirosław Handke (Solidarity Electoral Action) 31 October 1997 – 20 July 2000
- Edmund Wittbrodt (Solidarity Electoral Action) 20 July 2000 – 19 October 2001

=== Ministers of National Education and Sport ===
- Krystyna Łybacka (SLD) 19 October 2001 – 2 May 2004
- Mirosław Sawicki (no party) 2 May 2004 – 1 September 2005

=== Ministers of National Education ===
- Mirosław Sawicki (no party) 1 September 2005 – 31 October 2005

=== Ministers of Education and Science ===
- Michał Seweryński (PiS) 31 October 2005 – 5 May 2006

=== Ministers of National Education ===
- Roman Giertych (LPR) 5 May 2006 – 13 August 2007
- Ryszard Legutko (no party) 13 August 2007 – 16 November 2007
- Katarzyna Hall (no party) 16 November 2007 – 18 November 2011
- Krystyna Szumilas (PO) 18 November 2011 – 27 November 2013
- Joanna Kluzik-Rostkowska (PO) 27 November 2013 - 16 November 2015
- Anna Zalewska (PiS) 16 November 2015 – 4 June 2019
- Dariusz Piontkowski (PiS) 4 June 2019 – 19 October 2020
- Przemysław Czarnek 19 October 2020 – January 1, 2021

=== Ministers of Education and Science ===
- Przemysław Czarnek (PiS) 19 October 2020 - 27 November 2023
- Krzysztof Szczucki (PiS) 27 November 2023 - 13 December 2023

=== Ministers of National Education ===
- Barbara Nowacka (iPL) 13 December 2023 – present

== See also ==
- Komisja Edukacji Narodowej
