= Kashubian–Pomeranian Association =

Polish regional association

- Kaszëbskò-Pòmòrsczé Zrzeszenié
- Formation: 1956; 70 years ago
- Headquarters: Gdańsk
- Leader: Bożena Ugowska
- Website: http://www.kaszubi.pl/

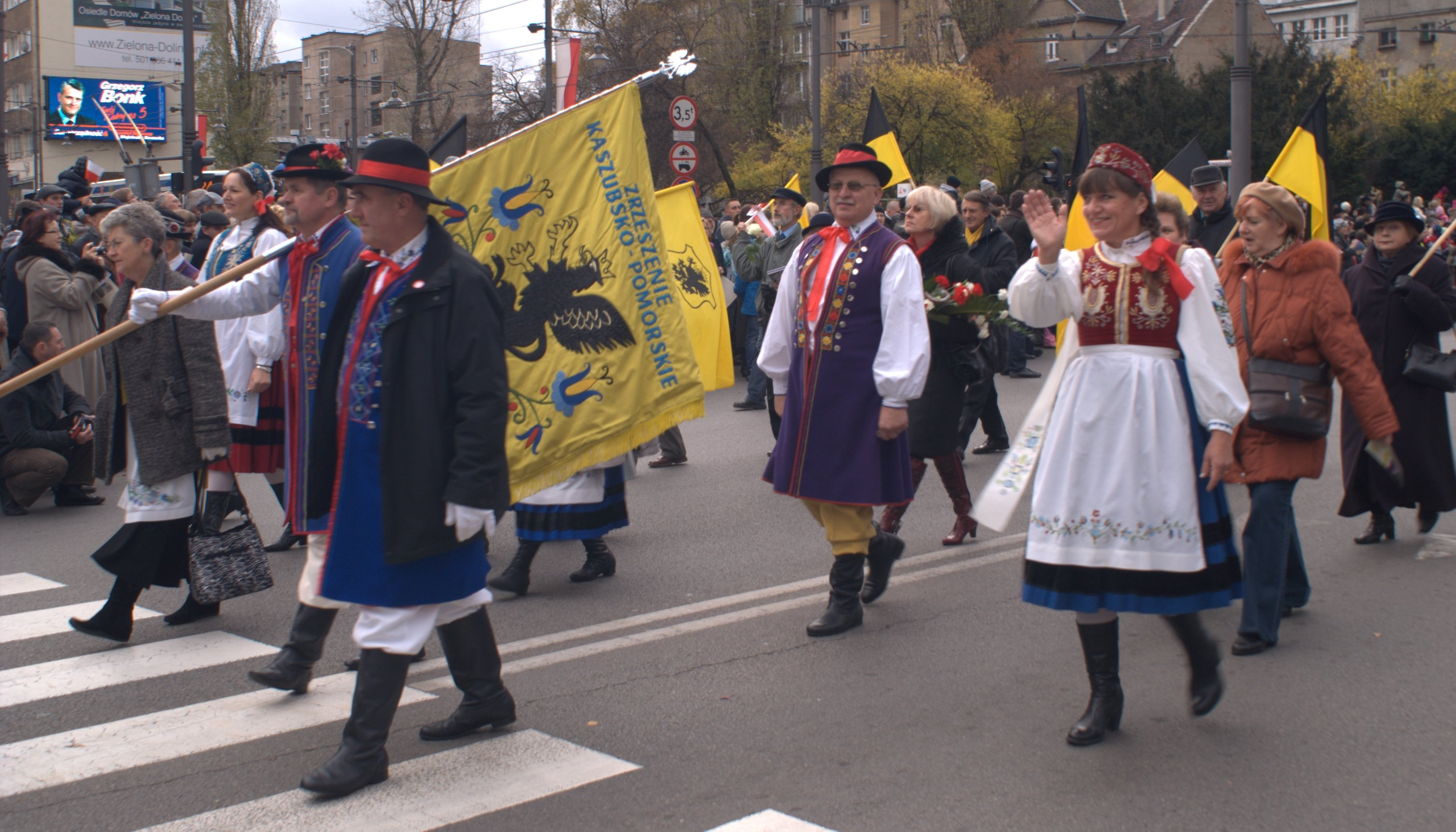
Kashubian standard

The Kashubian-Pomeranian Association (Kashubian: Kaszëbskò-Pòmòrsczé Zrzeszenié; Polish: Zrzeszenie Kaszubsko-Pomorskie) is a regional non-governmental organization of Kashubians, Kocievians and other people interested in the regional affairs of Kashubia and Pomerania in northern Poland. Its headquarters are in Gdańsk, Poland.

The Kashubian Language Council (Kashubian: Radzëzna Kaszëbsczégò Jãzëka; Polish: Rada Języka Kaszubskiego) is a body of the Kashubian-Pomeranian Association that oversees and promotes the Kashubian language.

Pomerania is a monthly journal founded in 1963 which publishes in Polish and Kashubian.

Presidents of the Association:

- 1956–59: Aleksander Arendt
- 1959–71: Bernard Szczęsny
- 1971–76: Jerzy Kiedrowski
- 1976–80: Stanisław Pestka
- 1980–83: Izabella Trojanowska
- 1983–86: Szczepan Lewna
- 1986–92: Józef Borzyszkowski
- 1992–94: Stanisław Pestka
- 1994–98: Jan Wyrowiński
- 1998–04: Brunon Synak
- 2004–10: Artur Jabłoński
- 2010–16: Łukasz Grzędzicki
- 2016–19: Edmund Wittbrodt
- 2019–25: Jan Wyrowiński
- 2025–present: Bożena Ugowska
