= Joanna Kluzik-Rostkowska =

Polish politician (born 1963)

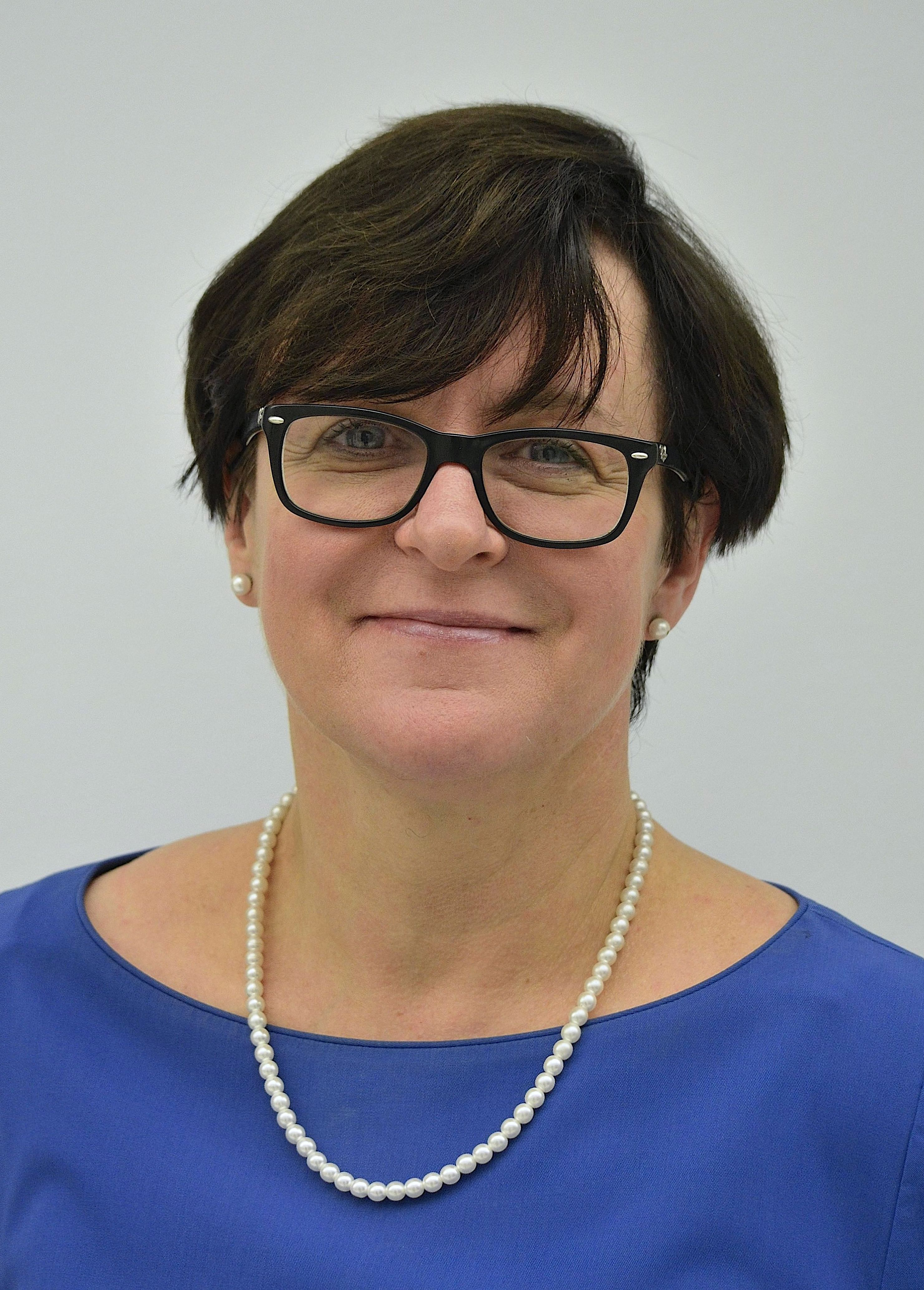
- Official portrait, 2015

Minister of National Education
- In office 27 November 2013 – 16 November 2015
- President: Bronisław Komorowski; Andrzej Duda
- Prime Minister: Donald Tusk; Ewa Kopacz
- Preceded by: Krystyna Szumilas
- Succeeded by: Anna Zalewska

Minister of Labour and Social Policy
- In office 13 August 2007 – 16 November 2007
- President: Lech Kaczyński
- Prime Minister: Jarosław Kaczyński
- Preceded by: Anna Kalata
- Succeeded by: Jolanta Fedak

Member of the Sejm
- Incumbent
- Assumed office 21 October 2007
- Constituency: 9 – Łódź (2007-11); 30 - Rybnik (2011-)

Personal details
- Born: 14 December 1963 (age 62) Katowice, Poland
- Party: Civic Platform
- Other political affiliations: Law and Justice (2007–10); Poland Comes First (2010–11)
- Education: University of Warsaw
- Profession: Journalist

Joanna Grażyna Kluzik-Rostkowska (born 14 December 1963) is a Polish politician and member of the Sejm for Civic Platform. She was elected for Law and Justice in 2007, but led a breakaway group in 2010 to form the more liberal Poland Comes First, of which she was leader. She resigned from the party in June 2011, joining Civic Platform following rumors. In November 2013, following a cabinet reshuffle by Prime Minister Donald Tusk, Kluzik-Rostkowska was appointed to head the Ministry of National Education.

== Early life ==
Joanna Kluzik-Rostkowska was born on 14 December 1963 in Katowice, Poland. She graduated from the University of Warsaw with an M.A. in Journalism and Political Science. In 1989, she joined Tygodnik Solidarność, becoming a member of the paper's political section before moving on to Express Wieczorny, becoming editor of the newspaper and garnering the attention of Lech Kaczyński, who was then chief of the Presidential Chancellery. In 1996, Kluzik-Rostkowska joined the ranks of Wprost, becoming a political correspondent. Later, in 2000, she began working for the magazine Nowe Państwo. From 2001 to 2004, she was employed by the women's monthly Przyjacióka.

== Political career ==
In 2004, Kluzik-Rostkowska entered Warsaw's municipal bureaucracy, becoming chief specialist of the mayor's press office. Kaczyński, now elected as Mayor of Warsaw, later appointed Kluzik-Rostkowska as head of the mayor's outreach department for women and families. As a member of Law and Justice, Kluzik-Rostkowska ran for a seat in the Sejm during the 2005 parliamentary election, but failed to be elected. Nevertheless, Kluzik-Rostkowska joined the government of incoming Prime Minister Kazimierz Marcinkiewicz, who made her deputy head of the Minister of Labour and Social Policy. Before joining the ministry, Kluzik-Rostkowska voiced support for in vitro fertilisation during a media interview, prompting one of the government's junior coalition partners, the League of Polish Families, to threaten the coalition of withdrawing its support. However, the League failed to block Kluzik-Rostkowska's nomination, who later became head of the ministry's commission on the equal status of men and women.

From August to November 2007, Kluzik-Rostkowska served as the Minister of Labour and Social Policy under the government of Prime Minister Jarosław Kaczyński. Kluzik-Rostkowska replaced Minister Anna Kalata of Self-Defence during a cabinet reshuffle following Self-Defence's exit from the Law and Justice-led government. Despite the Kaczyński government's defeat in the 2007 parliamentary election, Kluzik-Rostkowska was elected to a seat in the Sejm.

In 2010, Kluzik-Rostkowska presided over Jarosław Kaczyński's campaign during the 2010 presidential election, called 'Poland Comes First'. A leading party moderate, she was ejected from Law and Justice after hinting of her candidacy for the party's leadership "if need be". Having left, she established Poland Comes First, a new political grouping with other Law and Justice dissidents including Sejm representatives Elżbieta Jakubiak and Paweł Poncyljusz, and MEPs Adam Bielan and Michał Kamiński.

She resigned from the party leadership on 5 June 2011, prompting rumors of her leaving the party altogether to join Civic Platform. Following her defection to Civic Platform's ranks, Kluzik-Rostkowska described her decision as to "do everything [to ensure] that Law and Justice do not return to power." She was reelected to the Sejm as a member of Civic Platform in the 2011 parliamentary election, representing Rybnik.

In November 2013, Kluzik-Rostkowska was appointed by Prime Minister Donald Tusk as the next Minister of National Education, replacing Krystyna Szumilas.
