= Szczepan Lewna =

Polish politician and activist

Szczepan Lewna is a politician and Kashubian activist. He was the chairman of Kashubian–Pomeranian Association in the period 1983–1986.
