= Stanisław Skrzeszewski =

Polish politician

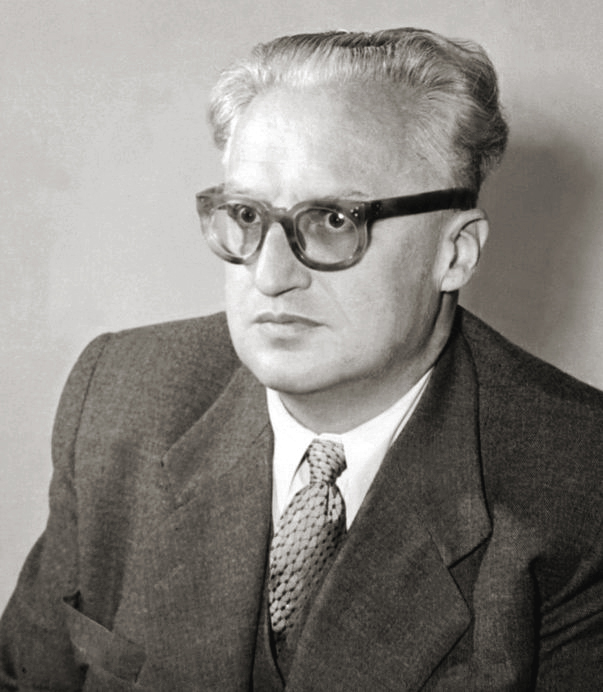

Minister of Foreign Affairs
- In office 20 March 1951 – 27 April 1956
- Prime Minister: Józef Cyrankiewicz; Bolesław Bierut
- Preceded by: Zygmunt Modzelewski
- Succeeded by: Adam Rapacki

Minister of Education
- In office 6 February 1947 – 7 July 1950
- Prime Minister: Józef Cyrankiewicz
- Preceded by: Czesław Wycech
- Succeeded by: Witold Jarosiński

Personal details
- Born: 27 April 1901 Nowy Sącz, Austria-Hungary
- Died: 20 December 1978 (aged 77) Warsaw, Polish People's Republic
- Party: Communist Party of Poland; Polish Workers' Party; Polish United Workers' Party
- Education: Faculty of Philosophy of the Jagiellonian University
- Profession: Educator, diplomat
- Awards
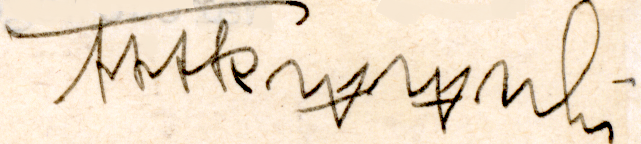
- Signature

Stanisław Skrzeszewski (27 April 1901 – 20 December 1978) was a Polish communist politician, educator and prominent statesman of the Polish People's Republic.

== Biography ==
Born in to the family of a train conductor, Skrzeszewski was active in socialist circles from his teenage years. From 1920 he worked as a village teacher and studied at the Faculty of Philosophy of the Jagiellonian University and received a doctorate in philosophy.

From 1921, he belonged to communist youth circles. From 1922 a member of the Communist Youth Union and from 1924 a member of the Communist Party of Poland. He was arrested in 1924, he was released thanks to the intervention of Władysław Heinrich. Not admitted to work at the university, he left for France. where from 1925 to 1926 he studied philosophy and general methodology at the Sorbonne. There he maintained contacts with the French Communist Party, but wasn't involved in political activity. In the years 1926–1928 he was a teacher at the gymnasium in Dębica, where he founded the first cell of the KPP.

Arrested again on 20 April 1932, imprisoned in Krakow for five weeks. From the end of 1934 he was a contract lecturer of pedagogy and didactics at the State Pedagogium in Krakow. At the same time, he was active in the communist faction of the Polish Teachers' Union. He continued his career by working in Jagiellonian University.

After the Nazi Invasion of Poland on 3 September 1939, he left Kraków and after the Soviet invasion of Poland, he stayed in Lviv under the Soviet occupation. From November 1939 to January 1940 he was a lecturer at the Pedagogical Institute, later a researcher at the Institute of Teacher Training. In the second half of June 1941 he was summoned to Kiev in order to obtain - as a former member of the KPP, membership rights in the All-Union Communist Party (b). After the start of the German-Soviet war, he was evacuated deep into the USSR and worked as a teacher. Summoned to Moscow, he took part in the congress of the Union of Polish Patriots. at the congress, he delivered a lecture on cultural and educational matters and was elected to the main board of the union. From 1944, a member of the Polish Workers' Party and from 1945 to 1948 he was a member of the Central Committee of the party.

In 1944 he was the head of the Department of Education in the Polish Committee of National Liberation and from in 1944 to 1945 he was the Minister of Education. In the years 1945 to 1947 he served the Polish ambassador to France. in the years 1947 to 1950 he once agaon served as the Minister of Education. From 1948, he was a member of the Polish United Workers' Party and later on the Polish United Workers Party. From in 1948 to 1959 he was a member of its Central Committee and then, from 1959 to 1968 he member of the Central Audit Committee of the Polish United Workers' Party. In 1950–1951, he was undersecretary of state and deputy minister of the Ministry of Foreign Affairs and from 1951 to 1956 Skrzeszewski served as the Minister of Foreign Affairs. In 1956–1957, secretary of the State Council and from 1957 to 1969 he was the head of the Chancellery of the Sejm.

In 1953 he was a candidate put forward by the USSR for the post of UN Secretary General after Trygve Lie resigned.

In November 1949 he became a member of the National Committee for the Celebration of the 70th anniversary of the birth of Joseph Stalin.

Skrzeszewski died on 20 December 1978 and received a state funeral.

== Awards and decorations ==
- Order of the Banner of Labour, 1st Class (27 April 1951)
- Commander's Cross with Star of the Order of Polonia Restituta
- Medal for Warsaw 1939–1945 (17 January 1946)
- Grand Cross of the Hungarian Order of Merit (Hungary, 1948)
- Order of the National Flag, 1st Class (North Korea, 1951)
- Order of the Star of the Romanian People's Republic, 1st Class (Romania, 1948)
