= Ministry of Education and Science (Poland) =

Former government ministry of Poland

- Ministerstwo Edukacji i Nauki (Polish)
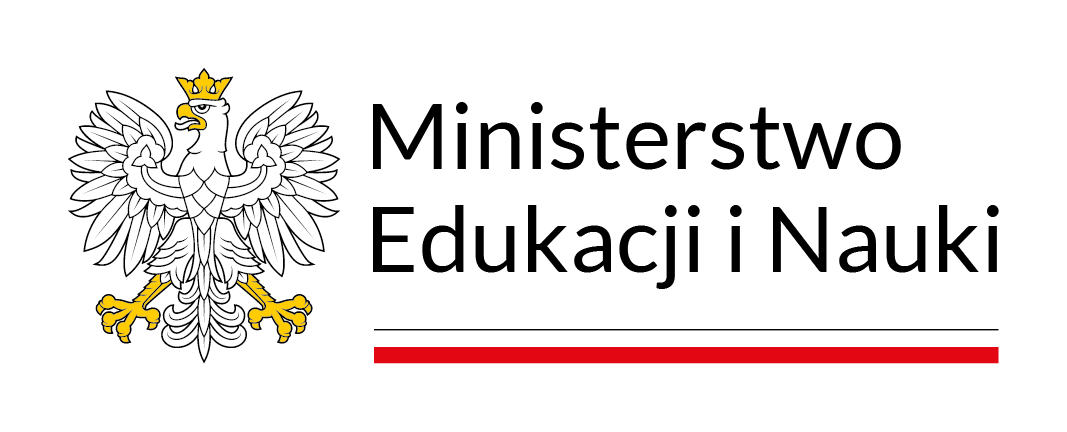
- Logo

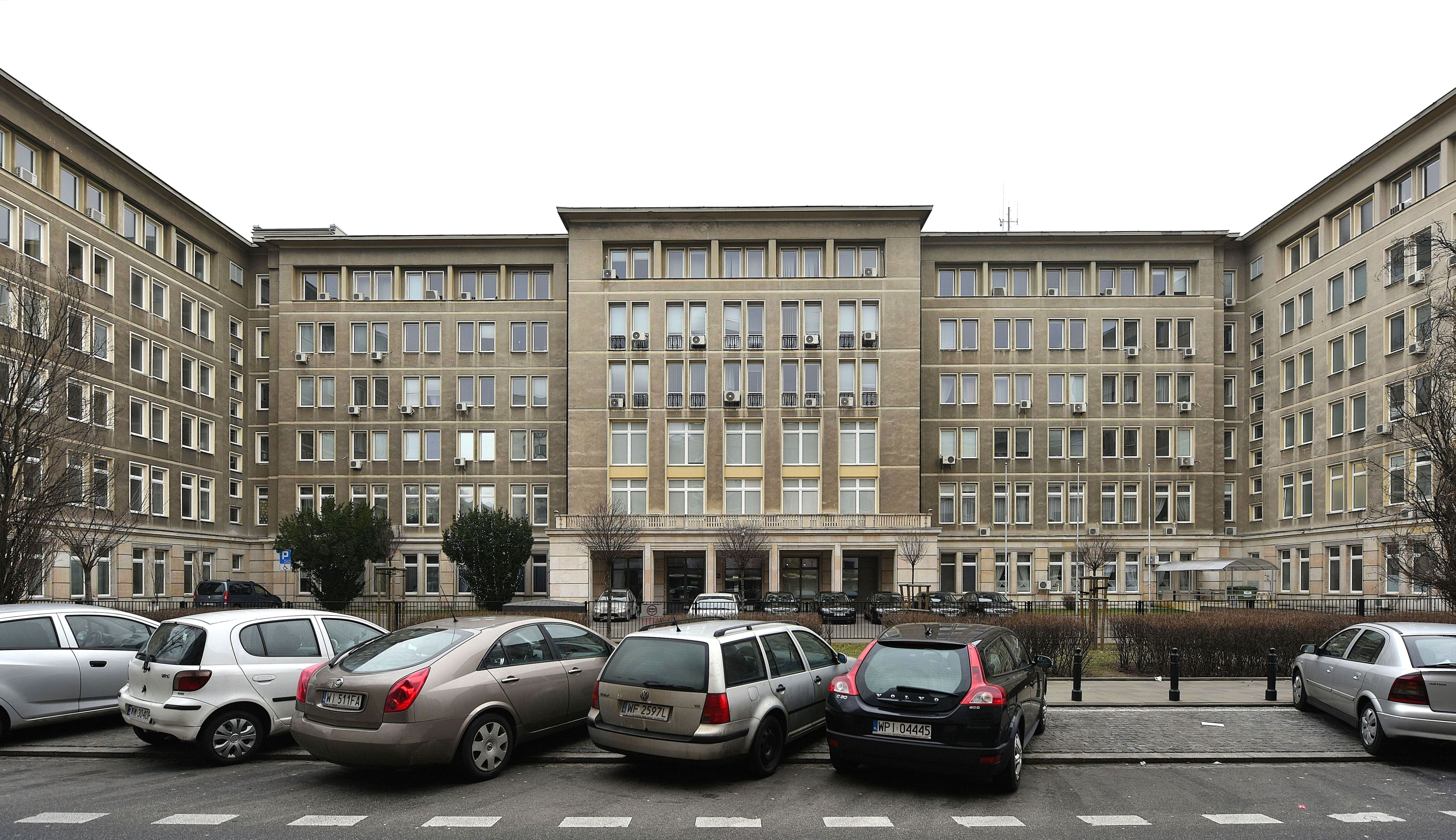
- The ministry headquarters at 1 and 3 Wspólna Street in Warsaw, Poland.

Agency overview
- Formed: 31 October 2005 (first ministry); 1 January 2021 (second ministry)
- Dissolved: 5 May 2006 (first ministry); 31 December 2023 (second ministry)
- Headquarters: 1/3 Wspólna Street, Warsaw, Poland

The Ministry of Education and Science (Polish: Ministerstwo Edukacji i Nauki, MEiN) was a ministry of the Government of Poland, which administrated the science and education. It functioned from 2005 to 2006, and again from 2021 to 2023.

== History ==
The Ministry of Education and Science of Poland was established on 31 October 2005 by the cabinet of Prime Minister Kazimierz Marcinkiewicz. It took over the divisions of the Ministry of National Education and Computerisation, responsible for higher education, science, and computerisation. On 5 May 2006, the ministry was divided into the Ministry of Science and Higher Education and the Ministry of National Education. Throughout its existence, its only minister was Michał Seweryński.

On 1 January 2021, the second cabinet of Prime Minister Mateusz Morawiecki reestablished the Ministry of Education and Science, via reincorporating together the Ministry of Science and Higher Education and the Ministry of National Education. Its headquarters were located at 1 and 3 Wspólna Street in Warsaw, Poland. Przemysław Czarnek became the minister, and was replaced by Krzysztof Szczucki on 27 November 2023.

On 13 December 2023, under the third cabinet of Prime Minister Donald Tusk, the role of the minister was divided into two offices, with Barbara Nowacka becoming the Minister of Education, and Dariusz Wieczorek, the Ministry of Science. On 1 January 2024, in accordance with the resolution of 16 December 2023, children's education and university education were split, returning to the older division of the two ministries as the Ministry of National Education and the Ministry of Science and Higher Education, with Nowacka and Wieczorek as ministers, respectively.

== Divisions ==
The Ministry of Education and Science was subdivided into several smaller structures. They were:

- the Department of Budget and Finance;
- the Department of Structural Funds;
- the Department of Information and Promotion;
- the Department of Invasion and Development;
- the Department of Control and Audit;
- the Department of Basic Education and Programme Bases;
- the Department of Science;
- the Legal Department;
- the Department of Science Programmes and Investigations;
- the Department of Strategy, Qualifications, and Higher Education;
- the Department of Higher Education;
- the Department of International Cooperation;
- the Department of Cooperation with Local Governments;
- the Department of Inclusive Education and Upbringing;
- the General Director Office;
- and the Minister of Digital Transformation Centre Office.

== List of ministers ==
No.	Picture	Name	Party	Date of assuming office	Date of leaving office	Term length	Government
1		Michał Seweryński	Law and Justice	31 October 2005	5 May 2006	185 days	Cabinet of Kazimierz Marcinkiewicz
2		Przemysław Czarnek	Law and Justice	1 January 2021	27 November 2023	1060 days	Second Cabinet of Mateusz Morawiecki
3		Krzysztof Szczucki	Law and Justice	27 November 2023	13 December 2023	16 days	Third Cabinet of Mateusz Morawiecki
4		Barbara Nowacka (Minister of Education)	Civic Coalition	13 December 2023	31 December 2023	18 days	Third Cabinet of Donald Tusk
4		Dariusz Wieczorek (Minister of Science)	New Left	13 December 2023	31 December 2023	18 days	Third Cabinet of Donald Tusk
