= Mirosław Handke =

Polish chemist and politician (1946–2021)

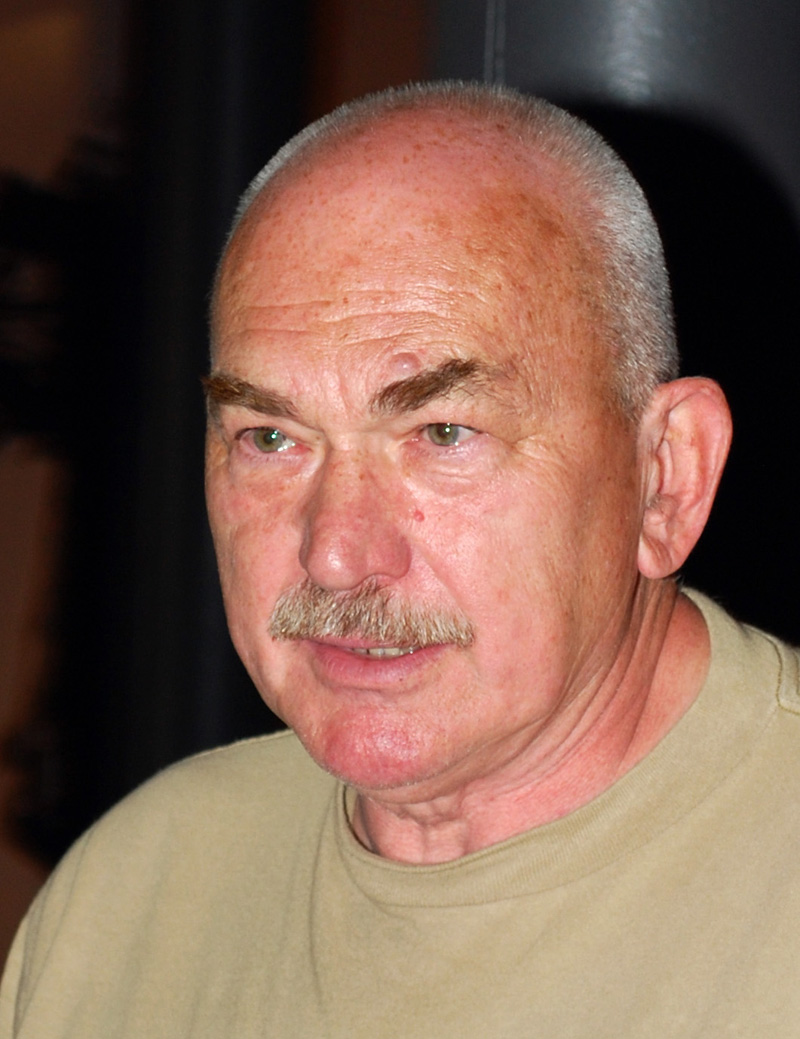
- Handke in June 2010

Minister of Education
- In office 31 October 1997 – 20 July 2000
- Prime Minister: Jerzy Buzek
- Preceded by: Jerzy Wiatr
- Succeeded by: Edmund Wittbrodt

Personal details
- Born: 19 March 1946 Leszno, Poland
- Died: 22 April 2021 (aged 75)
- Party: Solidarity Electoral Action
- Education: Jagiellonian University

Mirosław Handke (19 March 1946 – 22 April 2021) was a Polish chemist and politician, who served as Minister of Education from 1997 to 2000.

== Early life ==
Mirosław Handke was born on 19 March 1946 in Leszno.

Handke attended Jagiellonian University.

== Career ==
Handke was the Minister of National Education from 1997 to 2000.

Handke was the architect of the 1999 education reform.
