= Krzysztof Szczucki =

Polish politician (born 1986)

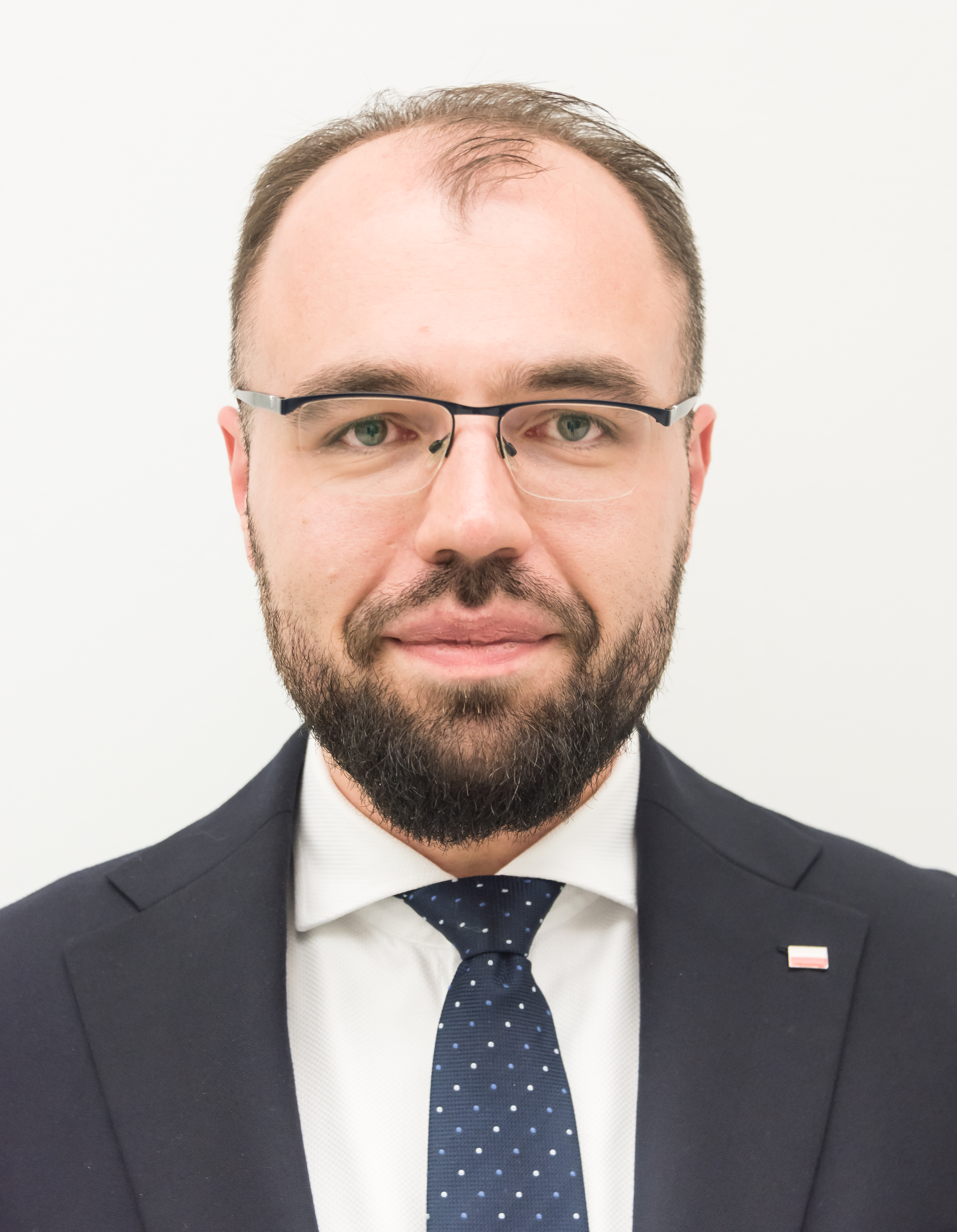
- Szczucki in 2023

Member of the Sejm
- Incumbent
- Assumed office 13 November 2023
- Constituency: Toruń

Minister of Education and Science
- In office 27 November 2023 – 13 December 2023
- Prime Minister: Mateusz Morawiecki
- Preceded by: Przemysław Czarnek
- Succeeded by: Barbara Nowacka (as minister of education); Dariusz Wieczorek (as minister of science)

Personal details
- Born: 18 October 1986 (age 39)
- Party: Law and Justice

Krzysztof Szczucki (born 18 October 1986) is a Polish politician serving as a member of the Sejm since 2023. From November to December 2023, he served as minister of education and science.
