= Michał Seweryński =

Polish politician (born 1939)

Professor Michał Seweryński
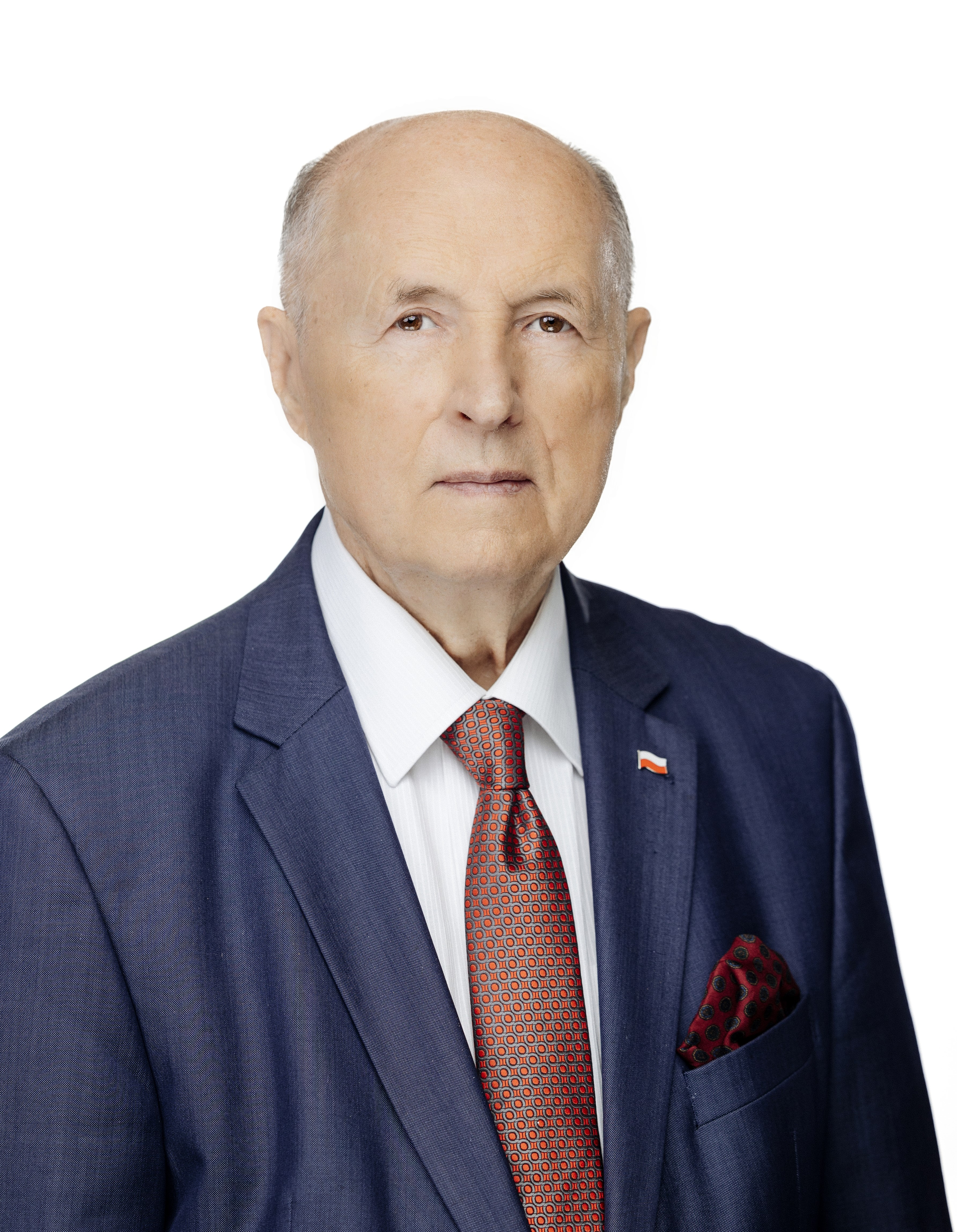

Deputy Marshal of the Senate
- In office 20 April 2017 – 11 November 2019

Minister of Science and Higher Education
- In office 5 May 2006 – 16 November 2007
- President: Lech Kaczyński
- Prime Minister: Kazimierz Marcinkiewicz; Jarosław Kaczyński
- Preceded by: Himself (Minister for Education & Science)
- Succeeded by: Barbara Kudrycka

Minister of Education and Science
- In office 31 October 2005 – 5 May 2006
- President: Aleksander Kwaśniewski; Lech Kaczyński
- Prime Minister: Kazimierz Marcinkiewicz
- Preceded by: Mirosław Sawicki (National Education)
- Succeeded by: Roman Giertych (As Minister of National Education); Himself (As Minister of Science and Higher Education)

Member of Senate
- Incumbent
- Assumed office 8 November 2011

Personal details
- Born: 1 July 1939 (age 87)

Michał Seweryński (born 1 July 1939 in Łódź) is a professor of the University of Łódź. Doctor honoris causa of the University of Lyon 3. Expert on Polish and international labour law. The author of about 130 scientific publications and reports at international congresses. Visiting professor at universities in France, Canada, Switzerland, Spain and Japan. Between 2006 and 2007, Minister of Science and Higher Education in Poland.

A member of Polish and foreign scientific societies. Member of the Papal Council for Secular Affairs, member of the Legislative Council at the chairman of the Council of Ministers, and deputy chairman of the Government Labour Law Reform Commission. Former Rector of the University of Łódź, former chairman of the Conference of Rectors of Polish Universities. A Knight of the Order of Polonia Restituta and of Palmes Academiques (France), Pro Ecclesia et Pontifice. Honorary Consul of France in Łódź.

== Biography ==
In 1962, Michał Seweryński graduated from the faculty of law of the University of Łódź. In the 1970s he pracitioned in Trieste and Paris. He obtained doctoral and habilitation degrees. In 1987, Seweryński was awarded the scientific title of associate professor. In 1990 he became a full professor, and specializes in Polish and international labour law.

As an academic teacher, Seweryński has become associated with the University of Łódź, where he headed the Department of Collective Labour Relations and Social Policy (Polish: Zakład Zbiorowych Stosunków Pracy i Polityki Społecznej). He also served as head of the Department of European Law. From 1990 to 1996, he held the position of rector of the University of Łódź. He has given guest lectures at universities in France, Canada, Switzerland, Spain, and Japan. He also took up a post at the University of Economics in Katowice in Katowice. Under his supervision, Zbigniew Hajn obtained a doctoral degree in 1986.

He became chairman of the National Council of Catholic Laypeople (Polish: Krajowa Rada Katolików Świeckich), and was a member of the Pontifical Council for the Laity. He also served as honorary consul of the French Republic in Łódź. He has published over 140 scientific works in the field of labour law. He has sat on national and international scientific societies. He served as chairman of the Conference of Rectors of Polish Universities. He was a member of the Legislative Council operating under the Prime Minister, deputy chairman of the government Commission for the Reform of Labour Law, and chairman of the Labour Law Codification Commission.

In the years 1997–2000 he cooperated with the Minister of National Education Mirosław Handke, preparing a draft law on higher education (which was ultimately not passed). In 2004 he unsuccessfully ran in the 2004 European Parliament election in Poland on the list of the National Electoral Committee of Voters organized by Maciej Płażyński. In 2005 he joined the Honorary Support Committee for Lech Kaczyński in the 2005 Polish presidential election.

From 31 October 2005 to 5 May 2006 he served as Minister of Education and Science. From 5 May 2006 to 7 September 2007 and again from 11 September 2007 to 16 November 2007 he was Minister of Science and Higher Education; in the period between these terms he held the position of secretary of state in the Ministry of Science and Higher Education and acting head of the ministry.

In the 2009 European Parliament election in Poland he ran for the second time (unsuccessfully) for the European Parliament on the Law and Justice list. In 2010 President Lech Kaczyński appointed him a member of the National Development Council.

He became a member of the Łódź Social Support Committee for Jarosław Kaczyński in the early 2010 Polish presidential election.

In the 2011 Polish parliamentary election he won a seat as a senator of the 8th term. Running for Law and Justice in constituency No. 27, he received 33,770 votes. In 2015 he was re-elected senator (receiving 59,410 votes). Due to his age he was appointed Senior Marshal of the Senate of the 9th term after the prior resignation of Barbara Borys-Damięcka. On 20 April 2017 he was elected Deputy Marshal of the Senate of the 9th term, replacing Grzegorz Czelej, who had been recalled the same day.

He became chairman of the Academic Civic Club named after President Lech Kaczyński in Łódź. In the 2019 Polish parliamentary election and 2023 Polish parliamentary election he successfully sought re-election to the Senate, receiving 86,706 and 87,381 votes respectively. On 7 November 2023 President Andrzej Duda appointed him Senior Marshal of the Senate of the 11th term.

== Personal life ==
Michał Seweryński was born to of Władysław and Irena Seweryńscy. He is married, with two children.

== Awards and honours ==
He was awarded the Knight's Cross (1993) and the Officer's Cross (2002) of the Order of Polonia Restituta, as well as the papal medal Pro Ecclesia et Pontifice. He is a Knight of the French Order of Academic Palms and the National Order of the Legion of Honour. In 2018, he was awarded the Gold and Silver Stars of the Japanese Order of the Rising Sun. In the same year, he was also honoured with the Michał Serzycki Award. In 2022, he received the Honorary Badge for Services to Legislation, and in 2023 the Gold medal “For Services to Polish Science – Sapientia et Veritas”.

He was awarded an honorary doctorate by Jean Moulin University Lyon 3. In 2011, he was awarded the City of Łódź Prize.
