= Katarzyna Hall =

Polish teacher, activist, and government worker

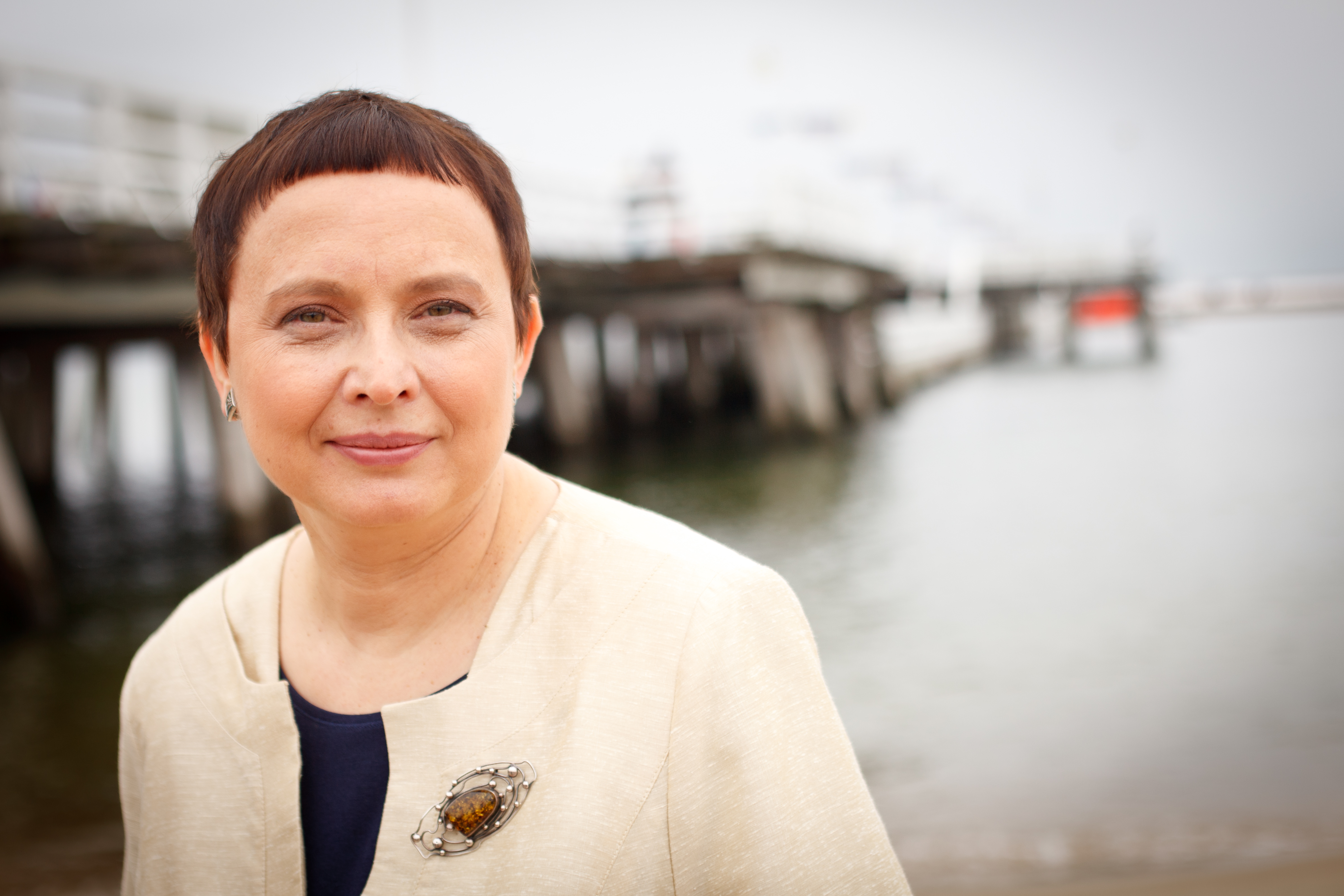

Minister of National Education
- In office 16 November 2007 – 18 November 2011
- President: Lech Kaczyński Bronisław Komorowski
- Prime Minister: Donald Tusk
- Preceded by: Ryszard Legutko
- Succeeded by: Krystyna Szumilas

Katarzyna Hall (Polish pronunciation: [kataˈʐɨna ˈxal]; née Kończa; born 15 March 1957) is a Polish teacher, educational and social activist, and local government clerk. She was the Minister of National Education of the Republic of Poland from 2007 to 2011.

She was born in Gdańsk.

In 2008, she invited Ivan Shyla to continue his education in Poland when he was kept from sitting for his final exam by Belarusian authorities. Shyla, a recipient of Poland's Konstanty Kalinowski Scholarship, was among a number of recipients of the scholarship who reported repression or hurdlers to leaving Belarus for Poland to resume their studies.
