= Jan Wyrowiński =

Polish politician (born 1947)

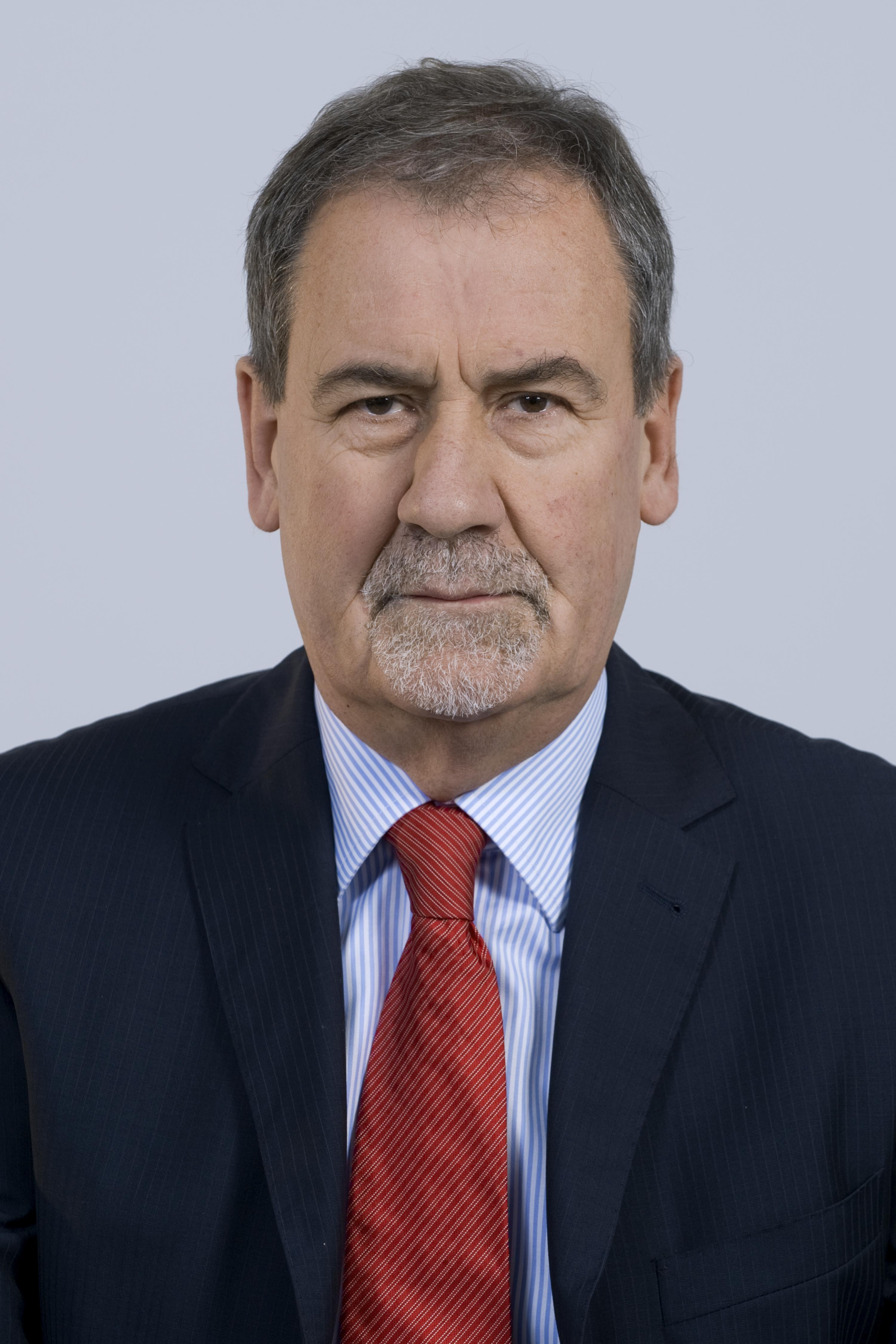
- Jan Wyrowiński in 2011

Deputy Marshal of the Senate of Poland
- In office 2011–2015

Member of the Senate of Poland
- In office 2007–2015
- Constituency: 11 Sieradz (after 2011); 5 Toruń (until 2011)

Deputy of the Sejm
- In office 2005–2007; 1989–2001
- Constituency: 5 Toruń (2005–2007); 47 Toruń (1993–2001); 16 Toruń (1991–1993); 098 Toruń (1989–1991)

Personal details
- Born: August 27, 1947 (age 78) Brusy, Poland
- Party: Civic Platform (2005–2015)
- Other political affiliations: Freedom Union (1994–2001); Democratic Union (1991–1994)

Jan Alfons Wyrowiński (born 27 August 1947, Brusy) is a Polish politician and Kashubian activist. He was the chairman of Kashubian-Pomeranian Association in the period 1994–1999. He has served multiple terms in the Sejm, Senate, as well as serving as Deputy Marshal of the Senate.
