= Zygmunt Modzelewski =

Polish politician (1900–1954)

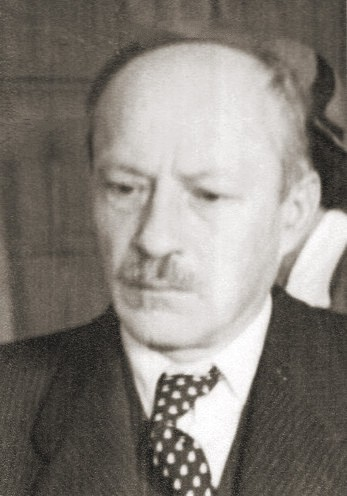

Minister of Foreign Affairs
- In office 6 February 1947 – 20 March 1951
- Preceded by: Wincenty Rzymowski
- Succeeded by: Stanisław Skrzeszewski

Ambassador of Poland to the Soviet Union
- In office 2 January 1945 – 28 June 1945
- Preceded by: Stefan Jędrychowski
- Succeeded by: Henryk Raabe

Personal details
- Born: 15 April 1900 Częstochowa, Congress Poland, Russian Empire
- Died: 18 June 1954 (aged 54) Warsaw, Polish People's Republic
- Resting place: Powązki Military Cemetery
- Party: Communist Party of Poland; Polish Workers' Party; Polish United Workers' Party
- Education: University of Paris
- Profession: Politician, diplomat, economist, professor

Zygmunt Modzelewski (15 April 1900 – 18 June 1954) was a Polish communist politician, professor, economist, and diplomat.

== Life and career ==
Modzelewski was born in to the family of a railroad worker. He was a member of the Social Democracy of the Kingdom of Poland and Lithuania and Communist Party of Poland. From 1923 to 1937, he was a member of the French Communist Party and even joined its Central Committee. In 1937 he moved to the Soviet Union and was arrested by NKVD in the same year in the Great Purge. Despite torture he refused to give false confession and was released in 1939.

During the Second World War he joined the Union of Polish Patriots and the Central Bureau of Polish Communists and became the first director of Polpress, a precursor to the Polish Press Agency. In May 1943 he was involved in the formation of the Polish 1st Tadeusz Kościuszko Infantry Division in the camp in Seltsy. At the rank of captain he became a lecturer in the Political Section of the Division. He joined the Polish Workers' Party in 1944 (and later its successor, the Polish United Workers' Party) and eventually became the member of its Central Committee. On January 2, 1945, he was appointed Polish ambassador to the USSR. He held this position until June 28, 1945, when the Moscow Conference on the establishment of the Provisional Government of National Unity ended. After returning to Poland, he became Undersecretary of State in the Ministry of Foreign Affairs, effectively heading the ministry in the TRJN between 1945 and 1947. He was a member of the Polish delegation to the Potsdam Conference. He was also a Polish delegate to the session of the Preparatory Commission of the United Nations. Involved in the work of the Slavic Committee in Poland. Minister of Foreign Affairs in 1947–1951. From 1951, Rector of the Institute for the Education of Scientific Personnel. From 1948, member of the Polish United Workers' Party and at the same time member of the Central Committee of the PZPR. In 1951, he defended his doctoral thesis in philosophy. From 1951, full professor, and from 1952, full member of the Polish Academy of Sciences. Between 1947 and 1952 he was a member of Legislative Sejm and in the years 1952–1954 a member of the Polish Council of State.

He died on June 18, 1954. He was buried at the Powązki Military Cemetery in Warsaw.

He was the adoptive father of Karol Modzelewski.

== Awards and decorations ==
- Order of the Builders of People's Poland (22 July 1954)
- Order of the Banner of Labour, 1st Class (15 April 1950)
- Commander's Cross with Star of the Order of Polonia Restituta (22 July 1949)
- Commander's Cross of the Order of Polonia Restituta
- Order of the Cross of Grunwald, 3rd Class (19 February 1946)
- Order of Merits for the People with Golden Star (Yugoslavia, 1946)
- Order of the White Lion, 1st Class (Czechoslovakia, 1947)
- Grand Cross of Order of the Dannebrog (Denmark, 1947)
- Grand Cross of Hungarian Order of Merit (Hungary, 1948)
- Order of the 9 September 1944, 1st Class (Bulgaria, 1948)
- Order of the Star of the Romanian People's Republic (Romania, 1948)
