= Krystyna Łybacka =

Polish politician (1946–2020)

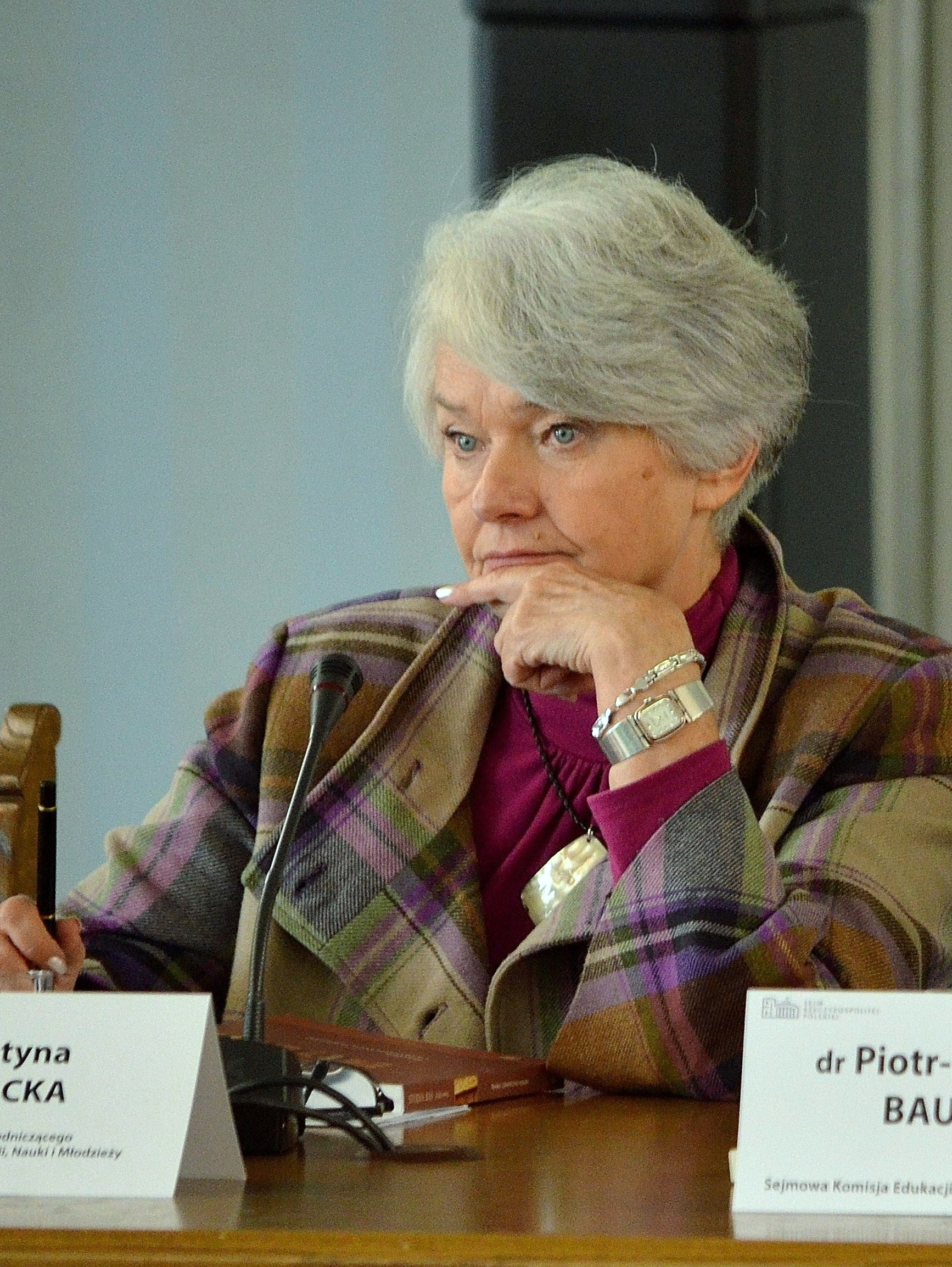

Member of the European Parliament
- In office 1 July 2014 – 1 July 2019

Member of the Sejm
- In office 25 November 1991 – 27 May 2014
- Constituency: 39 – Poznań

Minister of Minister of National Education and Sport
- In office 19 October 2001 – 2 May 2004

Personal details
- Born: 10 February 1946 Jutrosin
- Died: 20 April 2020 (aged 74) Poznań
- Party: Democratic Left Alliance

Krystyna Maria Łybacka (Polish pronunciation: [krɨˈstɨna wɨˈbat͡ska]; 10 February 1946 – 20 April 2020) was a Polish political figure who served in the country's national Parliament (Sejm), since 1991 to 2014 and from October 2001 to May 2004, and was a member of the cabinet, with the title of Minister of National Education.

A native of the small, west-central town of Jutrosin in Greater Poland Voivodeship's Rawicz County, Łybacka received her degree from the mathematics/physics/chemistry department at Adam Mickiewicz University in Poznań. Earning a doctorate from the Mathematics Institute of Poznań University of Technology in 1976 with the thesis, Random Division of a Square, she remained on the faculty of the Institute's Electrical Engineering department. A member of Polish Mathematical Society since 1969, wherein 1983-1986 she was a secretary, and in 1986-1989 - a member of the board of the Poznań Branch of the Polish Mathematical Society.

During the years 1978–89, she was a member of Polish United Workers' Party, the name used by the communist party ruling Poland between 1948 and 1989 and, in 1993, joined its successor party, the Social Democracy of the Republic of Poland, becoming, in 1996, its leader in Poznań. In 1999, she rose to the head of Poznań voivodeship sejmik [council] and, in December, to the deputy leader of the Democratic Left Alliance's national leadership council. Starting with modern Poland's first entirely free election, in 1991, she was re-elected to the Sejm in each subsequent poll, 1993, 1997, 2001, 2005, and 2007, serving on various committees, including the National Defense Committee and the Special Services Committee. In her 3rd term, she was deputy head of the Committee for Education, Study, and Youth, a position she also held in the 5th term.

In the aftermath of the 23 September 2001 parliamentary election, Prime Minister Leszek Miller asked her to join his cabinet in the position of Minister of National Education and Sport, which she fulfilled for the following two-and-a-half years from 19 October 2001 until 2 May 2004. Subsequently, in 2004–05, she was deputy leader of the Democratic Left Alliance's Parliamentary Club. Following her win in the 2007 election, with 24,405 votes in the Poznań constituency, she switched, on 22 April 2008, to the new Left grouping formed from the dissolved Left and Democrats.

In 2014 she was elected as Member of the European Parliament (MEP) for the Democratic Left Alliance party. In 2019, Łybacka received the Education, Culture and Media Award at The Parliament Magazine's annual MEP Awards.

== See also ==
- Members of Polish Sejm 2005-2007
