= Self-Defence of the Republic of Poland =

Political party in Poland

Self-Defence of the Republic of Poland Samoobrona Rzeczpospolitej Polskiej
- Abbreviation: SRP
- Leader: Krzysztof Prokopczyk
- Founder: Andrzej Lepper
- Founded: 27 July 1991; 35 years ago (trade union); 10 January 1992; 34 years ago (party)
- Registered: 10 January 1992 (trade union); 12 June 1992 (party)
- Headquarters: Aleje Jerozolimskie 30, 00-024 Warsaw
- Youth wing: OMOS RP
- Membership (2012): 100,000 (party); 500,000 (trade union)
- Ideology: Agrarian socialism Catholic socialism Catholic left Social conservatism Anti-neoliberalism; Left-wing antiglobalism Left-wing populism Left-wing nationalism
- Political position: Left-wing (Note: Some media considered the party right-wing or far-right as to compare Samoobrona to another anti-establishment party League of Polish Families. This is rejected by the majority of political scientists - Radosław Markowski criticized the media for incorrectly labelling Samoobrona, arguing that "They are not in most respects 'on the right'. They are in many respects, 'on the left'." Tim Bale also clarified: "Some commentators have categorised the agrarian-populist Self-Defence (Samoobrona) party, led by the controversial farmers’ union leader Andrzej Lepper, as a right-wing or radical right party. While there were clearly right-wing nationalist-populist elements in Self-Defence’s programme and discourse, its primary appeal was as a left-wing socialist agrarian-populist party." Political scientists, such as Sarah de Lange, Gerrit Voerman, Rafał Pankowski, Krzysztof Kowalczyk, Marek Migalski, Remigiusz Okraska, Paul G. Lewis and Zdenka Mansfeldová, Andrzej Antoszewski, Karol Kostrzębski, Marek Barański and Mateusz Piskorski, classified the party as left-wing. The party described itself as the "socialist left", and declared that "the traditions from which Samoobrona draws are the pre-war Polish Socialist Party and the Polish People's Party Wyzwolenie". Samoobrona competed with left-wing parties, such as the SLD and UP, for voters rather than right-wing ones, and Andrzej Lepper said: "I set myself the goal of convincing the left-wing electorate in such a way that they understand that the only left-wing, pro-social and patriotic party at the moment is Self-Defence." Lepper also stated: "I have always been and will always be a man of the left." He described his party as "the patriotic left, a progressive left, modern, tolerant, without any extremes or deviations". Comparing the voter bases of Samoobrona and LPR, Pankowski noted that Samoobrona voters were characterised by low income and anti-capitalist values, while the LPR ones were very religious and prioritised nationalist values. Additionally, it was speculated that Samoobrona might take over the place of the SLD as the main Polish left-wing party. The party is considered to have transformed from a "traditional protest party" into a "stabilised left-wing party" by 2005, and Samoobrona invited left-wing politicians, such as Piotr Ikonowicz and Leszek Miller, to its electoral lists. According to Jarosław Tomasiewicz, the party's decision to form a government with the right-wing PiS and LPR was not a shift to the right but an attempt to replace SLD as the largest Polish left-wing party. Samoobrona started cooperating with left-wing parties, such as the Democratic Party of the Left, Working People's Movement, and KPEiR. That the party continued and even doubled down on its left-wing rhetoric despite forming a right-wing government, which led to defections of some right-leaning members to LPR, while others seceded to found the Polish Peasant Bloc instead. It also led to the failure of the League and Self-Defense merger proposal. It was reported that the left-wing identity of Samoobrona warded off nationalists circles, hitherto considered friendly towards Samoobrona. Roman Giertych and his League of Polish Families rejected a possibility of entering a coalition with Lepper's party, citing Samoobrona's left-wing alignment and its support for same-sex partnerships as the reason. Samoobrona was also considered to be the party closest aligned with the fallen pre-1989 Communist regime; Samoobrona was called "probably the only political party that speaks well of Communist Poland" by Mirosław Karwat, while Piotr Długosz considers the party an "heir of the communist regime". Sławomir Drelich says that Samoobrona portrayed Communist Poland as superior to the post-1989 capitalist one, and calls the party "the most post-communist party on the Polish political scene". A 2003 survey by CBOS found that the majority of party's supporters wished Poland could have retained Communist economy. A 2005 survey of Samoobrona members found that over 50% of the party members identified as left-wing politically, while 26% members identified as right-wing. According to Mirosława Grabowska, both the voters and members of Samoobrona were much closer to the SLD than PiS or LPR politically.) to far-left (Note: Multiple sources: Antoszewski, Andrzej; Żukiewicz, Przemysław (2024). Ingrid van Biezen; Fernando Casal Bértoa; Lenka Buštíková (eds.). Exploring Party Switching in East‑Central European Legislatures: Party Drifters, Mavericks, and Chameleons. Routledge Studies on Political Parties and Party Systems. Routledge. p. 144. doi:10.4324/9781003504450. ISBN 978-1-003-50445-0. "For example, Self‑Defence (SO) movement, relevant in Poland in the first decade of the 21th century, was classified as a populist group, but at the same time it was assigned a very specific programmatic affiliation: agrarian–socialist (AGR–LEF), and was therefore classified in the overarching far‑left category."; Paul G. Lewis; Zdenka Mansfeldová (2007). "12.3 The role of the European issue". The European Union and Party Politics in Central and Eastern Europe. Palgrave Macmillan. p. 242. doi:10.1057/9780230596658. ISBN 9780230596658. "In the largest group of countries (Slovakia, Czech Republic, Hungary, Poland and, more recently, Estonia) Eurosceptic parties appear on both the right-wing nationalist (SNS, MIÉP, Ataka, LPR, to some extent ODS) and radical left (KSČM, Hungarian Labour Party, Association of Workers of Slovakia, Communist Party of Slovakia, Self-Defence) ends of the party spectrum."; Krzyżanowski, Michał; Krzyżanowska, Natalia (2026). "'We Put Family at the Centre of Social Life': Conceptual Flipsiding of the 'Family' in Discursive-Political Strategies of the Polish Populist Far-Right". Social Semiotics. 36 (1). Taylor & Francis: 102–103. doi:10.1080/10350330.2025.2601614. "As a result, the party would form a government with two other then populist parties: the radical-left peasant "Self-Defence" party (Samoobrona, SO) and the radical-right wing and Catholic-conservative "League of the Polish Families" (Liga Polskich Rodzin, LPR)."; Andrzej Antoszewski [in Polish] (2005). Partie polityczne Europy Środkowej i Wschodniej (in Polish). Poznań-Wrocław: Wyższa Szkoła Zarządzania i Bankowości w Poznaniu. p. 180. ISBN 83-88544-63-2. "Jedyne ugrupowanie ekstremalnej lewicy, które nie jest formacją neokomunistyczną, to polska Samoobrona. W wielu momentach jej program gospodarczy, akcentujący głównie konieczność powstrzymania prywatyzacji oraz ochronę narodowych interesów, jest zbieżny z postulatami partii neokomunistycznych." [The only grouping of the extreme left that is not a neo-communist formation is the Polish Samoobrona. At many points, its economic programme, which mainly emphasises the need to stop privatisation and to protect national interests, coincides with the demands of neo-communist parties.]; Ryszard Herbut [in Polish]; Andrzej Antoszewski [in Polish] (2007). Systemy polityczne współczesnej Europy (in Polish). Wydawnictwo Naukowe PWN. p. 102. ISBN 978-83-011-4622-1. "W niektórych elekcjach wzięły udział także inne partie, które mogą być określone mianem skrajnej lewicy. Mamy tu na myśli Związek Robotników Słowacji (ZRS), ukraińską Progresywną Partię Socjalistyczną (SPS) oraz polską Samoobronę." [Other parties that can be described as extreme left also took part in some elections. We are referring to the Union of Workers of Slovakia (ZRS), the Ukrainian Progressive Socialist Party (SPS) and the Polish Self-Defence.]; Krzysztof Jasiewicz; Agnieszka Jasiewicz-Betkiewicz (2007). "Poland". European Journal of Political Research. 46 (6–7). European Consortium for Political Research: 1069. doi:10.1111/j.1475-6765.2007.00752.x. "In its public statements, Self-Defense has been critical (often harshly) of the legacies of both communism and Solidarity, yet among its leaders there are several individuals formerly associated with the communist regime. Its support for state interventionism and opposition to market mechanisms place it on the political far left."; Madalena Pontes Meyer Resende (2004). An Ethos Theory of Party Positions on European Integration: Poland and Beyond (PDF). ProQuest LLC. p. 159. "However, an analysis of the evolution of the last years makes it apparent that the party identity is mainly based on a radical conception of economic class and is constituted by those heavily disadvantaged by the transition. The Samoobrona can therefore be classified as an extreme-left party."; Agata Górny; Aleksandra Grzymała-Kazłowska; Piotr Koryś; Agnieszka Weinar (December 2003). "Multiple citizenship in Poland" (PDF). Prace Migracyjne. 53 (1). Institute for Social Studies Warsaw University: 45. "We did not consider the populist far-left (Samoobrona) and the nationalistic far right wing (LPR) nor the Polish Peasants' Party: PSL. There were many reasons for such a decision. None of the two extreme parties had representatives in the parliament of the 3rd term, when the debate over citizenship reached its peak."; Kovalov, Maksym (2013). "The Effects of Populism on Democratic Quality in the Czech Republic, Poland and Ukraine". OU - Dissertations (9437). Norman, Oklahoma: The University of Oklahoma: 57. "The radical left parties represent traditional agrarian populism, such as Self Defense (Samoobrona) in Poland."; Manó Gábor Tóth (2008). "Carrot and Stick: The Prospect of EU Membership as a Motive in States in Transition" (PDF). Interns Yearbook. Skopje: Analytica: 66. "The right-wing Law and Justice Party formed a minority government in Poland after the 2005 elections, and formed a majority government next year in coalition with the provincial far-left Self Defence Party and the xenophobic far-right League of Polish Families, having the Kaczyński twin brothers as president and prime minister."; Vladimír Naxera; Viktor Glied; Ondřej Filipec; Małgorzata Kaczorowska (October 2020). ""To protect national sovereignty from the EU?" The 2019 EP elections and populist parties in V4 countries" (PDF). UNISCI Journal. 54 (1): 76. doi:10.31439/unisci-98. ISSN 2386-9453. "These include, first and foremost, extreme-left Self-Defense (Samoobrona Rzeczpospolitej Polskiej, SO, Self-Defense) and the League of Polish Families (Liga Polskich Rodzin, LPR)."; Derrick M. Nault; Bei Dawei; Evangelos Voulgarakis; Rab Paterson; Cesar Andres-Miguel Suva (2013). Experiencing Globalization: Religion in Contemporary Contexts. Anthem Press. p. 143. ISBN 978-0857285591. "PiS grew increasingly populist after 2005, when the party entered into a coalition with the LPR and the populist extreme-left Self-Defense."; Soule, Véronique (23 October 2005). "Gdansk o Berço do Solidariedade, Ancora-se à Direita". Público (in Portuguese). Gdansk. "Gdansk, onde a social-democracia e ainda mais a extrema-esquerda populista da Samoobrona (Autodefesa) obtiveram resultados bem inferiores à média nacional, foi sempre um grande bastião do anticomunismo." [Gdańsk, where social democracy and even more so the populist far-left Samoobrona (Self-Defence) obtained results well below the national average, has always been a stronghold of anti-communism.]; María Guadalupe Jimena Castro López (November 2008). Lorena Ruano Gómez (ed.). El apoyo a la Unión Europea en Hungría y Polonia tras su adhesión (PDF) (Título de Licenciada en Ciencia Política y Relaciones Internacionales thesis). Mexico City: Centro de Investigación y Docencia Económicas. p. 49. "Autodefensa de la República de Polonia (Samoobrona RP): extrema izquierda, socialista, populista, católico, socialista. (economía), aislacionista y nacionalista." [Self-Defence of the Republic of Poland (Samoobrona RP): far left, socialist populist, Catholic socialist (economy), isolationist and nationalist.]; Deloy, Corinne (24 September 2007). "Elections législatives et sénatoriales en Pologne, 21 octobre 2007". L'Observatoire des Élections en Europe (in French). Fondation Robert Schuman. ISSN 2272-1436. "Autodéfense - Samoobrona (SO) est un parti populiste d'extrême gauche fondé en 1992 et dirigé par Andrzej Lepper." [Self-Defence - Samoobrona (SO) is a far-left populist party founded in 1992 and led by Andrzej Lepper.]; Marsh, Michael; Mikhaylov, Slava; Schmitt, Hermann (2007). European Elections after Eastern Enlargement: Preliminary Results from the European Election Study 2004. CONNEX Report Series No 01. Mannheim: Mannheim Centre for European Social Research (MZES). p. 244. ISSN 1864-1539. "The 2001 election was the first that Samoobrona, now Samoobrona Rzeczypospolitej Polskiej (SRP), contested as a party. It can be labeled as a radical populist-left party, as it predominantly concentrates on economic and socio-economic issues."; Kubas, Sebastian (2014). Marek Barański; Jerzy Wiśniewski (eds.). "Kształtowanie się kategorii rodzin partyjnych w Czechach, Polsce, Słowacji i na Węgrzech w perspektywie 25 lat demokratyzacji". 25 lat transformacji w krajach Europy Środkowej i Wschodniej. Katowice: Wydawnictwo Uniwersytetu Śląskiego: 91. ISBN 978-83-8012-371-7. "W Polsce w omawianym okresie lewicowym ugrupowaniem radykalnym była Samoobrona. Partia opierała swoją działalność na promowaniu wizerunku charyzmatycznego lidera Andrzeja Leppera." [In Poland, the left-wing radical party in question was Samoobrona. The party based its activities on promoting the image of its charismatic leader, Andrzej Lepper.]; Musiałowska, Ewa (2008). "Political Reporting in Poland: What Has Changed over The Last Decade?" (PDF). Communicating for Social Impact. 58th Annual Conference of the International Communication Association (ICA). Montreal, Quebec: International Communication Association. p. 4. "Self-Defense is a radical left-wing grouping that emerged on the wave of distrust to Polish political elites."; Kristina Mikulova (2012). "Missionary Zeal of Recent Converts": Norms and Norm Entrepreneurs in the Foreign Policy of the Czech Republic, Poland and Slovakia 1989-2011. University of Oxford. pp. 229–230. "Apart from the relatively rare individual cases in the mainstream, opposition to the Polish forces' participation in the Iraq War mainly rested with parties on the fringes of the political spectrum: the far-right League of Polish Families (LPR) and far-left Self-Defense (Samooborona) [sic]."; Rekawek, Kacper; Renard, Thomas; Molas, Bàrbara (2024). Russia and the Far-Right: Insights from Ten European Countries (PDF). The Hague: International Centre for Counter-Terrorism (ICCT) Press. p. 316. doi:10.19165/2024.1563. ISBN 9789083419916. ISSN 2468-0486. "Together with Mateusz Piskorski, a longtime stalwart of the pro-Russia scene in Poland, and a former parliamentarian with the far-left and populist Samoobrona (Self-Defence) party, they also ran the YouTube channel Die Guten Menschen! until 2021, the recordings of which were repeatedly shared by Dugin on his now-defunct Facebook fan page."; Cristóbal Rovira Kaltwasser; Paul Taggart; Paulina Ochoa Espejo; Pierre Ostiguy (26 October 2017). The Oxford Handbook of Populism. Oxford Handbooks. Oxford University Press. p. 193. doi:10.1093/oxfordhb/9780198803560.001.0001. ISBN 9780192525376. "On the radical left, Poland's Self Defence (Samoobrona Rzeczpospolitej Polskiej, SRP) party exploited rising public discontent with the politics and politicians of transition to enter parliament as the third largest party in 2001."; Eckhard Jesse; Tom Thieme (2011). Extremismus in den EU-Staaten (in German) (1 ed.). VS Verlag. p. 450. ISBN 978-3-531-17065-7. "Zehn linksextremistische Parteien zogen von 1994 an ins Europaparlament ein, von denen die meisten – mit Ausnahme der polnischen Samoobrona – in ihren Wahlergebnissen relativ stabil blieben." [Ten left-wing extremist parties entered the European Parliament from 1994 onwards, most of which - with the exception of the Polish Samoobrona - remained relatively stable in their election results.])
- Religion: Roman Catholicism
- National affiliation: Social Alliance (1998); Liga i Samoobrona (2007)
- Colours: Yellow; Blue; Green (Note: The colour of the party's flag, also seen as a main colour in party's conferences.)
- Slogan: We choose red and whites Polish: Wybieramy biało-czerwonych
- Anthem: This Country is Ours and Yours; Polish: Ten kraj jest nasz i wasz
- European parliamentary group: Non-Inscrits; EUD Group (2005–2009) (founder); PES Group (2004–2009) (member); UEN Group (2004–2009) (individual MEPs)
- Sejm: 0 / 460
- Senate: 0 / 100
- European Parliament: 0 / 51
- Regional assemblies: 0 / 552
- City presidents: 0 / 117

Website
- https://samoobronarp.org/ (party) http://samoobrona.net.pl/ (trade union)
- Politics of Poland; Political parties; Elections; New logo of the party, adopted in 2009.

Logo of the party used on its website. However, the party continues to use the original logo. The trade union of Samoobrona also continues to display the original logo.

The Self-Defence of the Republic of Poland (Polish: Samoobrona Rzeczpospolitej Polskiej, SRP) is a Christian socialist, populist, agrarian, and nationalist political party and trade union in Poland. The party promotes agrarian socialist and Catholic socialist economic policies combined with a left-wing populist, anti-globalization and anti-neoliberal rhetoric. The party describes itself as left-wing, although it stresses that it belongs to the "patriotic left" and follows Catholic social teaching. The party is sympathetic to Communist Poland, which led political scientists to label the party as neocommunist, post-communist, and far-left.

Though considered a "political chameleon", Self-Defence of the Republic of Poland is generally regarded as a left-wing party by historians and political scientists. According to Andrzej Antoszewski, Self-Defence was a radical left-wing party that by postulating the need to stop privatisation and protect workers' interests, often overlapped with neo-communist parties. In English-language literature, the party is described as a radical left-populist party. In the wake of the SLD's electoral defeat in 2005, Self-Defence was sometimes referred to as the "new left". It was also called a left-wing party with a populist-agrarian face. Political scientists also described it as socialist, allowing it to form alliances with the Democratic Left Alliance. On the other hand, its anti-neoliberal and nationalist narrative also allowed it to briefly cooperate with PiS and LPR in 2005.

Founded by Andrzej Lepper in 1992, the party initially fared poorly, failing to enter the Sejm. However, it was catapulted to prominence in the 2001 parliamentary election, winning 53 seats, after which it gave confidence and supply to the Democratic Left Alliance government. It elected six MEPs at the 2004 European election, with five joining the Union for Europe of the Nations and one joining the PES Group.

It switched its support to Law and Justice (PiS) after the 2005 election, in which it won 56 seats in the Sejm and three in the Senate. Lepper was appointed Deputy Prime Minister in the coalition government with PiS and the League of Polish Families. In 2007, he was dismissed from his position and the party withdrew from the coalition. This precipitated a new election, at which the party collapsed to just 1.5% of the vote: losing all its seats. On 5 August 2011, the party's leader, Andrzej Lepper, was found dead in his party's office in Warsaw. His death was ruled a suicide by hanging.

== History ==
=== Beginnings ===
The origins of Samoobrona date back to a spontaneous protest movement of farmers from Western Pomerania (the Darlowo area is the hometown of A. Lepper) and the Zamojszczyzna region, which developed into a trade union. The very creation of the political party was originally aimed solely at supporting the 'Samoobrona' Trade Union of Agriculture (ZZR 'Samoobrona'), which had played a leading role for a long time. Samoobrona as a movement had communist origins, and it originally was a peasant movement associated with the Polish People's Party, which back then was an agrarian socialist party associated with the fallen communist regime, and was considered one of the post-communist successor parties based on the nostalgia for the previous, socialist regime.

As Lepper reported many years later. Lepper, the idea to create a trade union, and then a political movement, was born after a meeting with Deputy Prime Minister Leszek Balcerowicz in the autumn of 1991: "Everything that happened afterwards - with me and Samoobrona - I therefore owe, to some extent, to that two hours long conversation of 10 years ago". In January 1992, the Trade Union of Agriculture "Samoobrona" was registered. The political party, which initially appeared under the name Przymierze "Samoobrona", was registered on 12 June 1992. In addition to representatives of ZZR "Samoobrona", it also included activists from the Metalworkers' Trade Union and a Green faction headed by J. Bryczkowski. In its first political declaration, Samoobrona described itself as a "radical" party that represents the interests of the economically disadvantaged and those living in poverty.

The beginnings of party's activities date to Lepper's home village Darłowo, which has been plunged into poverty between 1989 and 1991 as a result of the neoliberal Balcerowicz Plan, which dismantled the socialist economy in Poland in favor of a capitalist free-market one. As the state sector of agricultures was dismantled and privatized, rural areas experienced an extreme spike of unemployment, poverty and social exclusion. Unfavourable prices of agricultural products on the market further aggravated the situation - between 1990 and 1991, agricultural prices increased threefold while industrial prices increased tenfold, drastically diminishing the purchasing power of Polish agriculture. This was combined with a huge decrease in farmers' real income. In Lepper's region, the situation became particularly critical as a result of heavy rainfall, which caused local flooding.

On 18 January 1991, the first rally was organised in Darłowo, attended by local farmers and the unemployed, including Andrzej Lepper. During the rally, protesters formed the Self-Defence of the Unemployed Homeless Association of the Pomeranian Region Darłowo (Polish: Stowarzyszenie Samoobrona Bezrobotnych Bezdomnych Regionu Pomorskiego Darłowo). Samoobrona itself was then founded on 27 July 1991 as a trade union Protest Committee of Self-Defence of Farmers (Polish: Komitet Protestacyjny Samoobrony Rolników), with Lepper being elected as its leader. First protest initiated by Lepper then took place on 5 August 1991, which demanded that the state of natural disaster be declared in Darłowo, along with demanding special aid and compensation to affected farmers. Lepper also made an appeal to the local voivode that the government temporarily suspends the enforcement of unpaid debts on local citizens. His plea was ignored.

In front of the Darlowo town hall on 24 September, farmers put up unpaid agricultural equipment, having fallen into a spiral of debt due to the introduction of variable interest rates as part of the implementation of Balcerowicz's reform plan. Striking farmers announced the formation of the Farmers' Self-Defence Committee (Polish: Komitet Samoobrony Rolników). The blockade of Darłowo with agricultural machinery attracted press attention, and over a period of two months, the communal protest committee evolved into the "Provincial Self-Defence Committee" (Polish: Wojewódzki Komitet Samoobrony) of farmers in Koszalin with its headquarters in Darłowo. The farmers' protests were then supported by the Polish People's Party and the Independent Self-Governing Trade Union "Solidarity" of Individual Farmers (Polish: Niezależny Samorządny Związek Zawodowy „Solidarność” Rolników Indywidualnych). On 18 October 1991, A. Lepper headed the Farmers' Defence Committee established in Warsaw, which coordinated the protest of trade unionists in front of the Sejm building. The subsequent speeches were increasingly radical in nature; they were supported by a militant organisation created by the farmers called the Peasant Guard and groups of radical subcultural youth. On 14 November, an agreement was concluded between the protesters and the government, which provided for the suspension of bailiffs' executions threatening farmers and the establishment of a special Fund and the Restructuring and Debt Relief of Agriculture.

During the intense protests, Lepper made the first attempt in his political activity to participate in electoral competition. The electoral law for the Sejm and Senate, in force in 1991, allowed committees to register in only one electoral district, thus leading to an extreme fragmentation of the party system. However, the run in the 1991 Polish parliamentary election was unsuccessful - something that Lepper attributed to lack of his direct participation in the campaign. The list of the Provincial Farmers' Self-Defence Committee (Polish: Wojewódzki Komitet Samoobrony Rolników) opened by the party's leader received only 3,247 votes in constituency number 21, covering the then Koszalin and Słupsk voivodeships. Registered in only one of 37 constituencies, the 3,247 votes won by the committee amounted to 0.03% of the nationwide popular vote. With Lepper being on top of the electoral list, other two candidates of the committee were Leszek Siudek and Józef Kołodziej. Lepper presented his committee as "farmers' social movement emerged on the basis of farmers' disconent". Already in the program of the committee, Lepper appealed to populist policies and ideologies that would then shape Samoobrona - the tradition of the interwar peasant movement, Catholic social teaching, nationalism, and "real socialism" (the socialism of Polish People's Republic). While unsuccessful, the electoral run spread the message of Samoobrona to a wider audience, and it was soon able to form associations with farmer movements across Poland.

Three months later, the second wave of farmer protests then emerged, with greater intensity than the protests of 1991. Already functioning as the National Council of the Trade Union "Self-Defense", Samoobrona delivered a new ultimatum to the government in early 1992, including the clearing of farm debts and a program of "cheap" credit for farmers, with cheap defined as credits with an interest rate below the inflation level, which amounted to 40% in 1992. After the demands were ignored, Samoobrona was joined in with other trade unions and farmer associations in aummer 1992, organizing nationwide farmer protests that soon turned radical and even violent, earning Samoobrona its reputation as a radical formation. Samoobrona then started defining its ideological character, stating the need for farmers to stand against "the dictatorship of the International Monetary Fund" and arguing: "Under communism, the Soviets ordered us Poles what to do, and now this dictatorship position has been taken over by international capitalism." Samoobrona extended its debt clearance demands to non-agricultural parts of the economy, and on 10 July, the protests reached its climax when farmers organizing a march in Warsaw, where the protesters clashed with anti-riot police deployed by the government.

In 1993, Andrzej Lepper took part in an interview with journalists Jan Ul and Henryk Gaworski, where Lepper introduced Samoobrona and the ideology of the party. Lepper identified with the rebel faction of the Polish United Workers' Party that opposed the leading "Jaruzelski-Rakowski" wing and wanted to prevent the "policy of selling out genuinely socialist ideals and values". He also stated that Samoobrona wished to replace the capitalism of Balcerowicz with "a system that would satisfy human needs, that would prioritise man over labour and labour over capital, and would not be a system of the market but a system of social control over economic life through the state and trade unions"; Lepper admitted that this system would be socialist, but stressed the "indigenous", nationalist, "patriotic" and Catholic character of Samoobrona's socialism, one that was to be inspired by Catholic social teaching and agrarian-socialist pre-WW2 peasant movements. As the movement expanded beyond its original local base in the north-western region of Poland as a result of high-profile violent protests in Warsaw, it became an actor beyond regional politics. While new regional offshoots emerged, Self-Defence was also involved in attempts to build a viable national protest movement. Its main allies in these ultimately futile efforts were extreme nationalist groups such as the Stronnictwo Narodowe „Ojczyzna”. Their joint demonstration in Warsaw on 2 April 1993, for example, turned violent and led to clashes with the police.

Agrarian protests of Samoobrona were attracting widespread media attention as well as popularity, and in April 1992 Lepper founded special paramilitary group of farmers called "Peasant Battalions" (Polish: Bataliony Chłopskie), referring to a Polish agrarian WW2-era resistance movement of the same name. Samoobrona's Peasant Battalions were to protect farmers against the bailiffs and evictions; after founding the group, Lepper stated: "We will strengthen physical fortitude, develop patriotism and train our military troops. We don't want war, but we have a lawless state, so we will fight the state offices - bailiffs, banks, tax

offices - with weapons in hand. We are a radical party, open to all disadvantaged people who are starving at home." The "Peasant Battalions" successfully harassed bailiffs, even reportedly shaving their heads and battering them. The party was accused by media of planning a revolution against the government, to which Lepper provocatively responded by stating his plans to expand the Samoobrona coalition with pensioners and unemployed. Incendiary comments of Samoobrona members such as "If someone has a billion or two or ten, they really couldn't have made it through legal work" became widely reported and known.

The emergence of Self-Defence as an organised political group was somewhat clouded by the alleged active involvement of former members of the communist security services who acted as advisers or activists, especially in the early days. In this context, the involvement of Soviet and Russian intelligence was also alleged. This led to calls for a parliamentary enquiry into the origins of the party and possibly its hidden agendas. One of the most striking features of Self-Defence was undoubtedly its clear longing for the former regime, which was identified with social stability and prosperity.

Samoobrona repeated slogans about the corruption of power, disregard for peasants and workers, accused the government of stealing Polish land and property and selling it to international capitalists, while Lepper also spoke of Poles starving in small towns and villages - pensioners, the unemployed, farmers. He demanded the departure of every successive government, especially ministers of agriculture. Some political commentators asserted that Lepper's actions were radicalising and argued that the party should be banned because of the criminal cases pending against the Samoobrona trade union: concerning, among other things, the occupation of state administration buildings and blockades of public roads, preventing government officials from carrying out their legal duties, the use of blackmail and intimidation against bank and court officials, and the seizure of private property.

Lepper consistently dominated the headlines by organising spectacular protests, such as the one outside the Sejm on 19 February 1993, when farmers set up 19 large scythes and one small one - as a "lady scythe" that was intended for Prime Minister Hanna Suchocka. By this time, Lepper was emerging not only as a defender of farmers, but also of all those disadvantaged by the new system. Samoobrona appeared wherever there were protests or bailiffs tried to enforce court rulings. Media widely reported on Samoobrona preventing the sale of a state farm in Główczyce and the "battle of the Sejm", when more than a thousand Samoobrona members turned up with banners "Poland for Poles" and "We will not be a feeding ground for any party", sparking clashes with the police and causing several dozen people, including Andrzej Lepper to be detained. A few months aftwards, several thousand farmers from the "Solidarity" of Individual Farmers, Farmers' Circles and Samoobrona demonstrated in front of the government seat in Warsaw, throwing sacks of straw to symbolise poverty in the countryside. Finally, the mayor of Praszka, Włodzimierz Skoczek, was taken away in a wheelbarrow (which became Samoobrona's speciality in the fight against officials) after refusing to sign the resignation submitted to him.

The leaders of the party frequently got into legal clashes and confrontations with the police and the judiciary because of their unruly protests. A joke became popular among Polish youth: "I wish you as much luck as the number of convictions of Lepper". At the same time, they were also invited to negotiations by the country's leaders. Self-Defence used its formal dual status as a party and a trade union, which allowed it to put on whatever hat was appropriate at the time. In the late 1990s, Lepper reportedly maintained a particularly close relationship with Artur Balazs, an agriculture minister who led the liberal-conservative Conservative People's Party, which was part of the ruling AWS. Over the years, Balazs and Lepper together built up an extensive network of patronage in the state agricultural authorities. Balazs again served as a bridge between Lepper and the conservative right in 2005.

=== Animal welfare activism ===
In 1999, Samoobrona entered a coalition with the American-based Animal Welfare Institute against Smithfield Foods, American food company that wanted to enter the Polish market. After years of the neoliberal "shock therapy" that allowed foreign companies to outcompete Polish farms, the discontent of Polish farmers resulted in mass protests in 1999 organised by Samoobrona. The protests grew to 8000 protesting farmers and resulted in a total of 120 blockades. Samoobrona protesters became militant and clashed with the police, often resulting in confrontations which forced the police to use tear gas and water cannons. The Polish government capitulated to protesters' demands after a month, reforming its agricultural policy and imposing high tariffs on food imports. Surveys at the time showed that 75 percent of Polish population supported Samoobrona's protests, and the party continued its protests and decided to participate in the "Trojan Pig Tour" organised by AWI.

After the success of Samoobrona's protest and the implementation of some agricultural policy reforms intended to improve the conditions of impoverished farmers in, the Animal Welfare Institute (AWI) took interest in Samoobrona. The chairman of the organization, Tom Garrett, believed that an alliance with Polish farmers against corporate farming could be possible, given that the company that the AWI was currently protesting for its unethical and cruel treatment of animals, Smithfield Foods, was trying to expand its operations into Poland. Garrett wrote: “Why doesn’t AWI bring Polish farm leaders over to tour communities infested with hog factories? Polish farmers are militant and well organized. If they saw for themselves what corporate hog factories have done in America, they’ll stop Smithfield in its tracks.” AWI requested the help of Agnes Van Volkenburgh, a veterinarian who was born in Poland and emigrated to the USA as a teenager. With her help, AWI invited the representatives of 4 farmer parties, a Polish ministry agriculture official, animal welfare activists, and Polish press.

Initially, it appeared that no cooperation would be reached - Polish representatives were skeptical of the AWI's extremely moralistic rhetoric on animal farming. During the meeting, AWI portrayed global corporations as an "all-consuming enemy" and "cancer" that had destroyed the American farmer and soil, along with mass murder of animals. Garrett recalled that the reception was “very negative” and “very hostile”. However, the radical Samoobrona was surprisingly receptive to AWI's message; Lepper agreed that corporate farming poses a moral issue, and called Smithfield Foods farms "hog concentration camps". Samoobrona and AWI settled on a common goal - "protecting farm animals from the cruelties of industrialized farming and defending farmers from being shamelessly robbed by politicians and foreign corporations." Samoobrona also connected this struggle to its support for socialism, noting that foreign companies take over Polish farming by dismantling and privatizing the communist-era State Agricultural Farms.

Lepper agreed to make anti-Smithfield lobbying a key plank of his presidential campaign, while also organising protests against Smithfield's expansion into the Polish market. While Lepper only won 3 percent of the popular vote in the 2000 Polish presidential election, he succeeded in setting the stage for Samoobrona's electoral success in 2001 parliamentary elections, and his anti-Smithfield campaigning mobilised Polish farmers against the company. Samoobrona organised a conference together with AWI in May 2000, promoting ecology and alternatives to industrial farming. At the same time, Samoobrona steadily incorporated more ecological and animal welfare themes into its program. Later in 2000, AWI-Samoobrona movement was endorsed by the president of Polish National Veterinary Chamber, Bartosz Winiecki, who recruited Polish veterinarians to the anti-Smithfield coalition. In the end, six thousands Polish doctors of veterinary medicine and twenty thousand veterinary technicians joined the coalition's protests.

Environmental activism of Samoobrona and AWI bore fruit in July 2000, when Polish Minister of Agriculture, Artur Balazs, declared that the government will oppose Smithfield's plans to introduce corporate farming in Poland. Smithfield conceded later that months, announcing that it was abandoning its plans to expand its activities into Poland. Samoobrona's activities proved crucial to bringing about a corporate farming ban in Poland; according to Joe Bandy and Jackie Smith, "the coalition between AWI and Samoobrona represents one of the successful cases in the emerging global justice movement". For his environmental activism, Lepper was awarded the Albert Schweitzer Medal in 2000. The leader of Samoobrona stated his commitment to animal welfare, stressing that animals must be treated "with respect, dignity and sympathy" and condemning modern meat industry as "concentration camps for animals".

The Albert Schweitzer Medal was awarded to Lepper by Robert F. Kennedy Jr. praised Lepper for “standing up to these bullies” who try to move industrial hog production all over the world, and for Lepper’s efforts to protect “our environment, human dignity, the dignity of these animals and of future generations.” He also congratulated Lepper “for the successful battle that [he has] waged against this criminal, bullying, outlaw industry.” In 2002, Lepper and AWI organized a four-day tour to Poland by Kennedy, who "exhorted Poles to defend their farms and countryside". In 2024, Kennedy discussed his cooperation with Lepper; he stated that in 2003, Smithfield Foods offered Lepper a bribe of 1 million dollars, but Lepper turned down the offer and revealed the bribery attempt.

After Samoobrona and AWI carried out its campaign, the image of Smithfield in Poland was tarnished. Samoobrona and AWI sent anti-Smithfield videos to every gmina government in Poland, along with a letter requesting them to deny building permits for Smithfield. This eventually made the Polish Agricultural Property Agency, a government institution, prohibit Smithfield from buying formerly state-owned farms. Farming corporations then shifted its strategy - instead of acquiring PGRs directly, they organized a web of contractual relations among nominally independent Polish companies, which allowed foreign companies like Smithfield to effectively control the farms nevertheless, bypassing the need to have Polish government's permission. In response, Samoobrona broadened its strategy by opposing European integration and the European Union.

=== 1990s elections ===
The party first started in parliamentary elections in 1993, gaining 2.78% votes and failing to enter the Sejm. It also took part in the 1994 local elections, where it did not play a significant role as party structures were not yet ready for an electoral campaign and were often in the preliminary state of organisation. The party won over 1.3% of the popular vote. The 1994 local elections are largely undocumented and were greatly affected by the lack of interest in Polish society, which translated into a very low turnout (33%). Samoobrona along with the Polish Socialist Party avoided forming local coalitions in the election. In the 1995 elections Andrzej Lepper ran for president and gained 1.32% of the votes; in parliamentary elections in 1997, the party took 0.08%. In 2000 Samoobrona organized a campaign of blocking major roads in order to get media attention. Lepper gained 3.05% votes in the presidential elections.

For the 1998 Polish local elections, Samoobrona founded the Social Alliance (Polish: Przymierze Społeczne) together with Labour Union (UP), Polish People's Party (PSL) and the National Party of Retirees and Pensioners (KPEiR). The coalition was mostly focused on protesting austerity and neoliberalism, which aligned perfectly with the main focus of Samoobrona. The coalition aimed to challenge the political dichotomy between post-communist SLD and anti-communist AWS, and was polling well. The coalition had internal conflicts however, as some wings of the PSL were concerned with the radical, far-left character of Samoobrona, whereas Labor Union protested Samoobrona's opposition to the European Union. Nevertheless, the coalition performed well and won 89 seats.

Social Alliance was an unprecedented case of the PSL working together with much more radical Self-Defence, and there was speculation at the time about the possibility of a permanent alliance being formed on its basis, which in the long term could lead to the full unification of political structures representing Polish farmers and the rural population. However, this proposal failed as both parties started strongly competing with each other. In this situation, cooperation was limited to undertaking successive joint initiatives aimed at bringing together and working out common positions by the three largest agricultural trade unions; in June 1998 it was agreed that ZZR "Samoobrona" together with KZRKiOR and NSZZ "Solidarność" RI would work out a common position on the terms of Poland's accession to the European Union.

The coalition also contributed to Samoobrona's rise to relevance. Shortly before the 2001 Polish parliamentary election, there emerged a project of a "Workers' and Peasants' Alliance" (Polish: Sojusz Robotniczo-Chłopski, SRC) combining Samoobrona and the Polish Socialist Party of Piotr Ikonowicz. More significantly, Samoobrona then gained informal support from the SLD, keen to weaken the PSL, which allowed Samoobrona to play the role of an informal SLD coalition partner in the Sejm and, after the 2002 local elections, also in the provincial assemblies. Although Lepper continued to lavish criticism on SLD politicians, he distinguished the liberal wing associated with Kwasniewski from the democratic socialist group headed by Miller and Oleksy. This allowed Samoobrona to attract a sizable group of left-wing activists, both at the central and local level. After 2001, Lepper went as far as announcing that Samoobrona would become the only party of the socialist left in Poland.

At the end of January/beginning of February 1999, the whole of Poland was paralysed by road blockades and border crossings organised by farmers supporting the party. In addition to an increase in the purchase price of pork livestock, they demanded extensive government intervention in the cereal, meat and milk markets. The agreement concluded with the government on 8 February 1999 only emboldened the head of Samoobrona to further excesses. In June 1999, on the radio in Łódź, Andrzej Lepper called the then government "an anti-Polish and anti-human regime" and Deputy Prime Minister Tomaszewski "a bandit from Pabianice". The prosecution proceedings initiated in this case ended in a failure after less than a year: when Lepper was returning from a trade union congress in India, he was spectacularly arrested after crossing the border in Kudowa (4 April 2000) and then released after three hours.

=== Entry into the parliament ===
In February 2001, Samoobrona entered coalition negotiations with the Polish Socialist Party. The aforementioned "Workers' and Peasants' Alliance" was to be a 'radical socialist' coalition between Samoobrona, PPS and the National Party of Retirees and Pensioners. PPS's leader Piotr Ikonowicz announced that cooperation with Samoobrona would extend beyond the election campaign, and that all three parties would closely work together to fight capitalist economic reforms. The main concept behind the socialist coalition was almost identical to Samoobrona's goal as a political party - to represent social groups that had been hurt by the capitalist transformation in Poland, which Ikonowicz listed as farmers, workers, pensioners, and students. Samoobrona was very supportive of a joint run with the PPS, and the party already cooperated with the socialist party in the 2000 Polish presidential election, when Samoobrona activists helped collect signatures for the PPS candidate, Piotr Ikonowicz. Lepper proposed PPS first 30 seats on the electoral lists and a possibility to form two separate parliamentary clubs in the Sejm. However, ultimately the Samoobrona-PPS-KPEiR coaliiton did not materialize because of the opposition of the PPS leadership, which considered Samoobrona an inappropriate political partner. After Samoobrona's spectacular performance in the 2001 election, numerous prominent PPS activists defected to it.

The parliamentary elections in 2001 gave the party 53 seats in the Sejm, with 10.5% support, making it the third largest political force. In September 2001, the winner of the election, the social democratic Democratic Left Alliance (SLD), was looking for a coalition partner in order to form a working majority. Because of its left-wing and pro-communist profile, Samoobrona was considered and the SLD leadership almost made the government offer, but eventually the party settled with its old coalition partner instead - Polish People's Party. Although officially a member of the opposition, Samoobrona backed the ruling social democratic Democratic Left Alliance in a number of key votes, giving them the majority needed to stay in power. The party has also marked its presence in the Sejm by unconventional disruptive behavior.

The 2001 election was a huge trump for the party, which unexpectedly became the third political force in Poland. The support for Lepper's organisation in the Koszaliński district reached 23%; over 15% was recorded in the Sieradz, Chełm and Piotrków districts. Samoobrona still had weak support in big cities: in Warsaw it received 3%, in the Poznań district 5%, and in the districts of Gdańsk, Gliwice and Katowice - 6% each. The campaign itself was characterised by a much calmer tone and much less aggression. A breakthrough in the ratings of the Lepper movement occurred at the beginning of September, when it reached a borderline 4-5% support in polls, which jumped to 8-9% after just a few weeks.

Lepper achieved only 3 percent nationwide among voters with a university degree and only 8 percent among voters with a high school diploma, even though the majority of students trusted him, according to surveys. Surprisingly, 9.4 percent of the self-employed voters - i.e. those doing private business - voted for Samoobrona, most of them being small entrepreneurs who feared economic competition in the event of Poland joining the EU. Overall, Lepper was elected by eleven percent of male and seven percent of female voters. He received eight per cent of the votes from voters aged 18 to 24, ten per cent from 25 to 59 and seven per cent from voters over 60. Samoobrona received 16 per cent of the vote in rural areas, eight per cent in towns with up to 50,000 inhabitants, seven per cent in towns between 50,000 and 200,000 and five per cent in towns with over 200,000 inhabitants. Samoobrona was particularly popular after the 2001 election - the survey conducted for "Rzeczpospolita" showed that in March 2002, 11 percent of Poles supported Samoobrona. In May 2002, 17 percent of Poles wanted the party to take power. The analyses of the Pentor Institute show that in April 2002, 18 percent of those questioned, i.e. almost one in five Poles, supported Samoobrona. From January to May 2002, the party's acceptance and popularity rose considerably from 9 to 17 per cent.

=== Cooperation with SLD ===
Despite the Democratic Left Alliance (SLD) ultimately deciding against choosing Samoobrona as its coalition partner, Samoobrona initially supported the SLD-PSL government and entered a confidence and supply agreement with it. The SLD also nominated Genowefa Wiśniowska, a member of Samoobrona, as the chair of the Parliamentary Committee on National and Ethnic Minorities. This nomination initially faced backlash because of the radical image of Samoobrona, but after a few weeks Polish media acknowledged that Polish minority groups reported no bias in the committee's work. This improved the image of Samoobrona and downplayed its nationalist reputation. Lepper continued to soften the image of his party in regards to national minorities, and visited the Belarusian Socio-Cultural Association in Białystok where he pledged to allocate additional funds to the Belarusian minority in Poland. He argued that "the development of Belarusian culture in Poland is under threat; in the absence of adequate funding, it has no chance of survival." Samoobrona also had a notably high support amongst the Ukrainian minority in Poland, consistently winning the municipalities in West Pomeranian Voivodeship and Warmian–Masurian Voivodeship where Ukrainians constituted a significant minority or plurality. Samoobrona also spoke for regulation that would allow for easy legal employment of Ukrainian workers in Poland, as well as allow Ukrainian citizens to not require a work permit at all for temporary and seasonal jobs.

Both parties also worked with each other on local levels, and formed coalitions in voivodeship sejmiks. Local leaders emphasized the left-wing outlook of both parties. Samoobrona also hoped to persuade the SLD to soften its pro-European stance, especially on the issue of European integration. In 2003, SLD also supported Andrzej Lepper's candidacy for the parliamentary inquiry committee regarding the Rywin affair; SLD explained that "Samoobrona was, is and will probably remain the SLD's main de facto ally and this is no surprise." Surprisingly, Lepper was also supported by the far-right and anti-capitalist League of Polish Families.

However, later in 2003, Samoobrona rebelled against the SLD and broke both the local coalitions as well as the confidence and supply agreement in the Sejm. Lepper stated that the "SLD presented a different program before the elections, after the elections it started to implement a different program, and today practically nothing remains of both the first one and the other one." Samoobrona accused SLD of betraying its social-democratic principles and did not turn the tide after the previous neoliberal government, continuing austerity and privatization reforms instead. The party also pointed out to the fact that the SLD responded to farmer protests with police forces and suppression, instead of trying to improve the agrarian situation in Poland; Lepper listed "the arrogance of the SLD, the disregard of Samoobrona's program objectives and the brutality of the government towards the protesters" as the main reasons for his hostility towards SLD. In its declaration of terminating the agreement with SLD, Samoobrona leadership in Łódź wrote that it could never work with a party responsible for breaking up farmers' protests. The SLD-PSL government fell shortly after, as the PSL left the coalition after the minister of economy, Jacek Piechota from SLD, abolished custom duties on some food products; PSL and Samoobrona decried this decision as "the nail in the coffin for farmers". SLD then entered a new coalition with the pro-European Labour Union that lasted until 2004.

The involvement of Piotr Tymochowicz's professional image creation company resulted, among other things, in a more attractive appearance for Andrzej Lepper (a solarium tan to mask blushing in moments of nervousness, well-tailored suits). He was also given lessons in rhetoric, eristic and retorting, and his tone of voice was lowered. The Self-Defence candidates appeared in the media wearing distinctive white and red ties, which not only made political identification easier for the voters, but also encouraged them to perceive the party as a strong and cohesive patriotic team. According to contemporary newspapers, election spots of the Lepper movement were also among the best presented in the campaign by all parties.

Among their numerous exploits there are such diverse incidents as using their own loudspeakers after being cut off for exceeding the permitted time, or claiming that the largest opposition party (Civic Platform) met with members of the Taliban in Klewki (a village near Olsztyn) to sell them anthrax. Several Samoobrona members of parliament were subject to criminal investigations on charges ranging from forgery to banditry.

In early 2005, Democratic Party of the Left, a left-wing anti-capitalist that split from Democratic Left Alliance, declared that their former party had "shown that they have nothing to do with the left". In wake of this, the party entered a formal agreement with Samoobrona, together with the National Party of Retirees and Pensioners. Both parties became close allies of Samoobrona, and their activists ran on Samoobrona's electoral list in 2005.

=== In the government ===
In the 2005 elections, Samoobrona received a total of 56 seats with 11.4% support. Andrzej Lepper ran for president of Poland in the 2005 election. He received third place and 15% of the vote, a great improvement over his past performances. The second round of the presidential election was then fought between Law and Justice and Civic Platform. The race became focused on socio-economic focused, where Law and Justice started shifting towards the economic left, calling for state intervention in the economy and economic redistribution. Law and Justice argued that it was the state’s responsibility to build provide for the social groups that have become disadvantages in the new capitalist Poland; the party attacked Civic Platform’s flagship policy to introduce a unitary 15 per cent ‘flat tax’, producing an ad criticizing the effects of economic liberalism by showing the contents of a child’s bedroom, a fridge and a pharmacy disappearing. Kaczyński argued that Tusk only represented the interests of the wealthy, and made the election a choice between the Civic Platform’s vision of a ‘liberal’ Poland, which would benefit the wealthy, and the Law and Justice's egalitarian concept of a ‘social’ or ‘solidaristic’ Poland. Law and Justice pleded to implement policies that would help the poor, and made what it called "an offer to the left", stressing its economically left-wing policies. While Lepper was initially skeptical, Kaczyński then pledged to fire Leszek Balcerowicz, the main organizer of the capitalist restoration in Poland, from his position as president of the National Bank of Poland. This convinced Lepper to endorse Kaczyński. In his endorsement of Kaczyński, Lepper argued that left-wing voters must vote against neoliberalism and justified his decision on the basis of Kaczyński's declarations in support of funding social welfare, fighting unemployment and taking a tougher stance towards the European Union.

After the election, Samoobrona would increasingly cooperate with Law and Justice starting in October 2005, given Law and Justice's pivot towards the economic left. The mutual cooperation of Samoobrona with LPR and PiS was initially informal and was based on Samoobrona supporting individual laws and the draft budget for 2006, to move into a more institutionalised phase, based on an agreement referred to as the ‘stabilisation pact’, up to a formal government coalition. Until the coalition was formed in May 2006, both parties supported the main activities of the government and PiS. The leaders of these parties held talks about the current situation in the country and attempts to stabilise the destabilised political scene. The first step on the road to a political alliance was to persuade Andrzej Lepper and Robert Giertych to support Marcinkiewicz's candidacy for the post of Prime Minister and to vote confidence in the PiS minority government. Initially, PiS was not interested in a coalition and only wanted to gain parliamentary support for the Marcinkiewicz government, but not at the expense of introducing people from Giertych and Lepper's entourage into the ranks of the Council of Ministers. However, the falling approval ratings and the lack of a parliamentary majority forced the ruling party's activists to enter into further negotiations with politicians from the League and Self-Defence, especially as there was a growing tendency towards early elections.

Jarosław Kaczyński, being aware of the serious parliamentary crisis, approached all the parliamentary groups in the Sejm, except for the SLD, with a proposal to conclude a six-month agreement - the so-called stabilisation pact, whose signatories would agree, among other things, to support the draft budget law, to keep Jurek of Law and Justice as Speaker of the Sejm and the adoption of a package of strategic laws proposed by PiS. Bearing in mind the complete deadlock in coalition negotiations, the Civic Platform completely rejected the ruling party's proposal, while Self-Defence, LPR and the Polish People's Party were interested in Kaczyński's offer. The first test of credibility for the future PiS partners was the budget vote. On 24 January 2006, the budget law was passed with the votes of the PiS, PSL, LPR and Samoobrona parliamentary clubs. Although the PSL supported the budget law and thus dismissed the vision of an imminent dissolution of the Sejm, it did not participate in further talks with PiS. On the other hand, the League and Self-Defence clearly sought a deeper alliance with this party.

Further negotiations at the level of the party leads were to lead to the signing of a stabilisation pact. The talks concerned a package of laws to be adopted by the parties that signed the agreement. LPR and Samoobrona, fearing early elections, agreed to most of PiS's legislative proposals, but their future political partners also made their own. The pact was to be divided into two parts: a rigid and a flexible one. The so-called rigid part, which did not raise any disputes or controversies, mainly included a provision on the establishment of the Central Anti-Corruption Bureau. The situation was quite different in the ‘flexible’ part, which included proposals from LPR ad Samoobrona. It included social bills that had to be implemented by the Ministry of Finance, such as a social benefit for all unemployed people, and the so-called senior benefit – an annual benefit for the poorest pensioners in the amount of PLN 500.

Finally, on 2 February 2006, after two weeks of intense negotiations, the leaders of PiS, Self-Defence and LPR signed a stabilisation pact. The 30-page document contained over 150 legislative proposals and provided for the establishment of the Central Anti-Corruption Bureau (CBA) and the Truth and Justice Commission, which would have the powers of a commission of inquiry and would be tasked with thoroughly investigating the scandals of the past 16 years of the Third Republic of Poland. In addition, the preparation of a social housing bill, an amendment to the National Bank of Poland Act, the passing of a biofuels bill and the annual adjustment of pensions to inflation were announced. The most controversial issue was the vetting of ‘public trust professions’ - ambassadors, members of the Monetary Policy Council, bank presidents and heads of state-owned companies. In addition, the signatories of the agreement have pledged not to submit or support any motion of no confidence against the government of Marcinkiewicz, or any motion to dismiss the Speaker of the Sejm.

Despite being a part of a right-wing government, the party doubled down on its left-wing rhetoric. Jarosław Tomasiewicz wrote: "This joint front with the right, however, did not mean a turn of the SRP to the right. On the contrary, Lepper's plan was for Samoobrona to take over the hegemony on the left". On the next party convention, Lepper stated: "I set myself the aim to convince the electorate of the left in such a way that they understand that the only left-wing, pro-social and patriotic party is currently Samoobrona". To this end, the party started cooperating with minor left-wing parties such as the Democratic Party of the Left, the Working People's Movement and the National Party of Retirees and Pensioners. The ranks of Self-Defence included activists from the Democratic Left Alliance (e.g. Grzegorz Tuderek, Bolesław Borysiuk) and the Labour Union (Andrzej Aumiller). To a large extent, Lepper's plan succeeded - while right-leaning voters defected to the League of Polish Families, this was compensated by further gains amongst left-wing voters - mainly pensioners, workers of bankrupt workplaces and former officers of the uniformed services.

According to contemporary polls, Self-Defence overtook Democratic Left Alliance in terms of popularity. Contemporary commentators speculated that Self-Defence might emerge as the new main left-wing party in Poland. Parallel to its parliamentary activity, the SRP tried to be active in the social sphere. The party started to cooperate with organisations of disabled people (even appointing a special plenipotentiary for contacts with them) and the circles of single mothers. Commenting on the developments in Poland, Bulgarian political scientist Maria Spirova argued that Samoobrona is a serious contender for becoming the "successor party" of the Polish United Workers' Party and the main representative of the Polish left:

The SdRP established itself for over a decade as a virtual monopolist in two ways: as a successor party to the communist PZPR and as a voice of the broadly understood Polish Left (united under the Democratic Left Alliance umbrella). The so far only serious challenge to these functions came after the turn of the century from the Self-Defense (Samoobrona), a radical populist party.

From the very beginning of this cooperation, Samoobrona and LPR demanded that their representatives be included in the security ministries, suggesting that they were the subject of operational activities by these ministries. Further disputes erupted in July 2006 and concerned the government's failure to implement the programme objectives of both parties and the possibility of influencing the appointment of TVP (public Polish Television) staff. August of the same year was marked by personnel disputes concerning the statements of Antoni Macierewicz as Deputy Minister of National Defence and Wojciech Mojzesowicz as Chairman of the Agriculture Committee. Further disagreements, this time over the 2007 budget, erupted in September. This was indicated by the votes during the committee meetings, where Samoobrona unexpectedly supported the opposition's motion to deal with the Credit Unions. In the same month, Self-defence submitted two draft resolutions to the Sejm, which directly attacked PiS. The first one concerned the immediate withdrawal of Polish troops from Iraq, the second one forced the government to debate the advisability of sending a thousand soldiers to Afghanistan. The measure of Samoobrona's potential as an opposition coalition partner was also the vote, together with the opposition, against a project important for PiS to amend the telecommunications law.

=== Collapse of the coalition ===
Misunderstandings between PiS and Samoobrona became common. First, in August 2006, the leader of Samoobrona announced that he would not support the 2007 budget, which was met by PiS with the announcement of the collapse of the coalition and the possibility of early elections. At the same time, a conflict flared up around Wojciech Mojzesowicz's candidacy for the position of chairman of the agriculture committee. His criticism of Andrzej Lepper's actions as Minister of Agriculture triggered a successful veto by the chairman of Samoobrona. This did not ease the growing crisis, which was increasingly centred around the adoption of the 2007 budget. In September, Lepper's arguments about the need to implement Samoobrona's demands which focused on increasing spending for the budgetary sphere and agriculture, disrupted the cooperation to such an extent that PiS politicians publicly proclaimed their belief in a serious crisis of the coalition. The exclusion of Samoobrona from the coalition became increasingly likely, which finally happened after Lepper was dismissed from the post of deputy prime minister and minister of agriculture on 22 September 2006 after he protested Kaczyński's decision to deploy Polish troops in Afghanistan. This complicated the situation of Jarosław Kaczyński's government and forced PiS to look for a new parliamentary majority. A step in this direction were the talks with the MPs who left the Samoobrona party and the Polish People's Party. The latter did not take the opportunity to join the government, but a new parliamentary group supporting the government was formed: the People's National Movement, consisting of members of the National Parliamentary Circle and former MPs of Samoobrona. Attempts to gain support for Jarosław Kaczyński's government from more and more former members of the Self-Defence party took the form of political corruption involving PiS leaders Adam Lipiński and Wojciech Mojzesowicz, as well as Renata Beger from Samoobrona. The exposure of the politicians' behind-the-scenes activities effectively blocked the government's chances of gaining majority support in this way.

In December 2006, a scandal broke out when Aneta Krawczyk, a local party ex-leader accused Samoobrona leaders, notably Andrzej Lepper and Stanisław Łyżwiński of sexual harassment. Subsequently, the accusation was supported by other females from within the party ranks and the issue of gaining governmental posts in exchange for sex produced a major outcry after Gazeta Wyborcza published the claims. Krawczyk also claimed her then 3-year-old daughter was Stanisław Łyżwiński's child, which proved to be incorrect following DNA testing.

However, the coalition seemed stable until July 2007 - at the beginning of the month, then Prime Minister Jarosław Kaczyński named Lepper as a person in the circle of suspicion in connection with the so-called "land affair". This concerned a CBA (Central Anti-Corruption Bureau) operation concerning the controlled payment of bribes to two people accused of citing influence in the Ministry of Agriculture. They offered a substituted CBA agent, for a bribe, the de-agglomeration of land in Muntów in the municipality of Mrągowo. The operation ended inconsistently with the CBA's plan, because Lepper cancelled the meetings. It was later alleged that Lepper had been warned about the sting operation. However, at the request of Prime Minister Jarosław Kaczyński, President Lech Kaczyński dismissed Lepper from the post of Deputy Prime Minister and Minister of Agriculture. This decision marked the end of the coalition.

As the sting operation against Lepper failed, it sparked an outrage. It was questioned whether the operation was ordered by Kaczyński himself, or if it initiated by the Polish secret services on their own volition. Some experts, such as the Lithuanian sociologist Zenonas Norkus, assert that the operation was a political move by Jarosław Kaczyński, who already planned to end the coalition and needed a reason that implicating Lepper in bribery activities would give him. The operation also compromised the entire cabinet of Kaczyński, as his Minister of Interior, Janusz Kaczmarek, was arrested and accused of leaking information on the sting operation to Lepper. Ultimately the investigation against Kaczmarek was dropped in 2009, putting into question whether Lepper was warned beforehand at all, or if he cancelled the meetings for other reason.

The party's position towards the scandal was that it was a "coup attempt", as the presence of Samoobrona in the government supposedly threatened powerful "interest groups", including corporations controlling large-format shops, investment fund owners, land speculators and property development groups. Lepper also argued that the scandals and investigations started against him were aimed at eliminating competition for Lech Kaczyński for future presidential elections. After unsuccessful attempts of Law and Justice to convince some of the Samoobrona MPs to defect, the PiS-Samoobrona-LPR coalition was officially dissolved on 5 August 2007. Reasons cited were ideological differences between PiS and Samoobrona on fundamental levels.

=== Downfall ===
Following the collapse of the ruling coalition, a proposal of a joint front between Samoobrona and right-wing League of Polish Families was born, known as League and Self-Defence (Polish: Liga i Samoobrona). The Polish abbreviation for this party was LiS ("fox" in Polish), and leaders of both parties brought a plush fox to the press conference, which was shown as the mascot of the new party. However, despite their populist character, LPR and Samoobrona were fundamentally different from each other, as Samoobrona was left-wing and aligned with socialist ideals, while LPR was a National-Catholic, far-right party. Andrzej Lepper himself admitted that the alliance was a bad idea, and argued that the alliance was purely situation and tactical in nature.

The idea was highly unpopular amongst Samoobrona supporters, as a majority of them identified as left-wing and desired a return to a socialist economy. A chunk of the Catholic socialist wing of the party known as Social Movement seceded to form a new party called Self-Defence Social Movement (Polish: Samoobrona Ruch Społeczny), which then became Self-Defence Rebirth.

The idea of the LiS party was then soon abandoned, and the party doubled down on its left-wing rhetoric, inviting Leszek Miller and the leader of the New Left, Piotr Ikonowicz, to its electoral lists. Despite this, numerous scandals heavily damaged the image of the party, while forming a government with right-wing parties and the LiS caused distrust among the party's overwhelmingly left-wing electorate. As a result, the party gained less than 2% of the popular vote in the 2007 Polish parliamentary election, failing to win any seats and being excluded from government funding.

The last bill proposed by Samoobrona before losing all of its seats in the 2007 election was a proposal from 7 September 2007 to recognize the Silesian language as a regional language of Poland. Along with the MPs of Samoobrona, the bill was also supported by the members of LPR, People's National Movement and the Polish People's Party. However, the Sejm was dissolved on the same day, prompting a snap election. The bill was therefore rejected. After 17 years, the Sejm voted in favor of a bill recognizing Silesian as a regional language in Poland on 26 April 2024. However, on 29 May 2024, the President Andrzej Duda vetoed the bill, claiming that Silesian is not a language and does not deserve its own status.

In November 2007, the regionalist wing of the party seceded and formed Party of Regions, further weakening local structures of the party. Lepper accepted responsibility for the party's electoral defeat and announced an extraordinary congress of Self-Defence in the first half of 2008. Lepper also announced that he did not intend to challenge or clash with the Party of Regions. In party congress, Lepper stressed that Samoobrona's goals from the time when it was a classic protest party, such as the reversal of privatisation processes, had not been realised and were still a political task for the party.

Considering the party's failure, leaders of regional branches of Samoobrona blamed the ill-fated coalition with Law and Justice and League of Polish Families. Paweł Frankowski (1950-2012), the leader of Samoobrona in the Łódź Voivodeship, recalled in June 2008:

The PiS, LPR and Samoobrona together came as a surprise to everyone. After the elections, the coalition that would have seemed most natural was the PiS/PO coalition. I don't know exactly why there was ultimately no agreement on this coalition. In any case, sharing power with the PiS and the LPR was a big surprise for me and for all the activists...

Waldemar Chmielak, who was elected one of Samoobrona's councillors to the Masovian Voivodeship Sejmik in the 2002 local elections from Garwolin County, said:

Lepper caused increasing confusion among our ranks, because we never really knew what he was going to do. From one meeting to the next, he would say one thing and then its opposite. He came across as an unstable politician. We needed to clearly define where we stood, rather than going where it was easiest to get into government. […] It was strange... it didn't seem serious. We should have stuck to our guns, rather than being like a flag in the wind, one moment on the right, the next on the left...

In 2008, Samoobrona tried to salvage its political influence - Lepper was still a member of the Parliamentary Assembly of the Council of Europe, but his term ended in January 2008. Lepper then ran in the 2008 Polish Senate by-election in Krosno, which was contested by 12 other candidates. The election was organized because the incumbent senator of the Krosno district, Andrzej Mazurkiewicz of Law and Justice, suddenly died on 21 March 2008. Despite being a by-election to fill a Senate seat of the deceased senator, it attracted media attention as it was the only election of 2008 in Poland, and it fielded a few nationwide recognizable candidates such as Lepper. Lepper believed that he had a chance to succeed - he believed that since Krosno was overwhelmingly rural, ‘a farmer will always get along with a farmer’. Polityka noted that Lepper "is the most recognisable politician of the dozen or so: wherever he appears, people want to have their photo taken with him."

Lepper was undaunted by the criticism of the media and argued that support for him and his party in the region is high. He discussed his achievements when he served as Minister of Agriculture, highlighting his water management program and aid for semi-subsistence farms. For Lepper, the by-election represented a chance to return to politics after the disastrous 2007 defeat; this made Lepper stand out by actively campaigning - he promised to bail out the indebted hospital in Przemyśl, help the laid off employees of Krosno glassworks factory, and improve the living conditions of Subcarpathian farmers. However, Maria Zbyrowska, the former leader of Samoobrona in the region, also ran in the election and criticized Lepper for running in the Podkarpackie region despite being born in Pomerania. Ultimately, Lepper won 3435 votes, which amounted to 4,1% of the popular vote; this gave him the 4th place.

=== Post-2007 developments ===
The party also reestablished its reputation as an unequivocally left-wing party. Talks were initiated with the Polish Socialist Party led by Piotr Ikonowicz and the democratic-socialist National Party of Retirees and Pensioners, proposing to establish "a worker–peasant alliance". There was also an attempt to establish a new party that would represent socialist left, with a view to prepare for the 2009 European Parliament election in Poland. However, the party went bankrupt by the end of 2007 as it was unable to pay for its 2007 electoral campaign. The party was also unable to cover its bills, and electricity and the alarm system were disconnected from the party headquarters. Lepper founded a new party known as "Self-Defence" (as opposed to "Self-Defence of the Republic of Poland") in 2010, which sustained itself solely on membership fees and had no commitments.

In 2009, as the two-party system of right-wing populist Law and Justice and centre-right neoliberal Civic Platform started consolidating itself, Samoobrona entered an "anti-neoliberal" media pact together with Law and Justice and Democratic Left Alliance. Informally known as the "media coalition", the pact was based on filling the managerial positions in Telewizja Polska (TVP) (Polish state media) with PiS-aligned persons that would exclude Samoobrona and Democratic Left Alliance from criticism and attacks in favour of focusing solely on the rising Civic Platform. On 29 July 2009, four out of five members of the National Broadcasting Council: Barbara Babula (recommended by Law and Justice), Piotr Boroń (representing President Lech Kaczyński), Tomasz Borysiuk (recommended by Samoobrona), Witold Kołodziejski (recommended by Law and Justice), elected the Supervisory Board of Telewizja Polska, which included people associated with the three parties of the "media coalition". All three heads of Telewizja Polska (Szwedo, Szatkowski, Orzeł) were associated with the Law and Justice party - the informal arrangement assumed that the position of TVP president went to PiS, and of two vice-presidents - to Samoobrona and Democratic Left Alliance.

In February 2010, he was inconvicably sentenced to two years and three months in prison for the sex affair. The leader of Self-Defence was also plagued by the troubles of his son Tomasz - in October 2010, the bank sold the agricultural machinery for non-payment of the lease. Nevertheless, Lepper was registered as a presidential candidate in the 2010 Polish presidential election. Lepper's support was highly localized - he was leading in rural and poor regions such as in Suwałki. Lepper was also the most popular candidate online, and his supporters dominated Polish social media such as NK.pl. However, this did not translate into widespread support, as Lepper was polling only 1% nationwide.

In March 2011, the Court of Appeal in Łódź overturned the verdict against Lepper in the sex affair and referred the case for retrial by the Regional Court. Afterwards, Aneta Krawczyk filed a court accusation that Lepper was the father of her youngest child. However, an examination of his DNA ruled out this allegation. These events caused not only politicians, but also the public public condemned the Samoobrona activists. It lost a part of its electorate. Lepper almost disappeared from the media. Rarely invited to interviews, he generally focused on criticising the right-wing Law and Justice party.

Lepper ran a traditionally leftist campaign, emphasizing that he and his party are ideological opponents of liberalism and privatisation, and proposing a socialised economy and nationalization of important industries. He promoted his concept of a Natural Disaster Fund, which would be a state-run program guaranteeing welfare and housing for victims of natural disasters, particularly floods. This harkened back to the Lepper's beginning in politics from 1991, when he emerged as the leader of local farmers impoverished by transition to capitalism as well as local flooding. Lepper also planned to renegotiate the conditions of Polish membership in the European Union, arguing that Poland is being untreated unfairly and that the subsidies for farmers are insufficient. Lepper relied on personal meetings with the voters and had a low-budget campaign at around 200.000 PLN. Lepper also stressed his opposition towards NATO, and argued for a complete withdrawal of Polish forces from Afghanistan, condemning the American operation in Afghanistan. He proposed that Poland prioritize cooperation with India, Russia and China rather than the United States. Otherwise, Lepper focused on socioeconomic issues and his economic populism, noting that other presidential candidates provide little mention of pensions, unemployment and the situation of the disabled. One of his main focus became healthcare, where Lepper proposed to suspend the debts of all hospitals, and strongly attacked privatization plans, arguing that they would further aggravate wealth inequality in Poland.

When questioned, Lepper stressed his opposition to abortion as well as euthanisation. He also emphasized his anti-EU and anti-NATO views throughout the campaign, and decried numerous privatization proposals present in the Polish political discourse. When criticized for his numerous convictions and investigations, Lepper stated that he is proud of his criminal record, as "99 percent were trials for blockades, for defending factories and people's jobs against their executions and bailiffs". In the end, Lepper won 1.28% of the popular vote and did not make it to the second round; he offered to endorse one of the main presidential candidates, Kaczyński and Komorowski, and wrote to them asking for their opinions on increasing the minimum wage, raising pensions and annuities, as well as their agricultural policy and international affairs. In the end, Lepper endorsed neither of the candidates as their replies were similar, and ultimately unsatisfactory, to Lepper. However, Lepper did stress his opposition to Jarosław Kaczyński, accusing him of deliberately ruining his career via sting operation that the Central Anticorruption Bureau illegally attempted to incriminate Lepper with in July 2007. Shortly after the election, Lepper went to Belarus and was an international observer in the 2010 Belarusian presidential election.

Despite the disheartening performance, Lepper stated that he will seek to gain a seat in the parliament once again. In 2011, Lepper was already preparing for the next election, believing that he retains a support base that he needs to mobilize. Unexpectedly, Lepper was found dead in his office on 5 August 2011, in what was ruled to be suicide. According to the official investigation, Lepper was planning to return to Polish politics. Co-workers of Lepper such as Janusz Maksymiuk also confirmed that the politician was already planning an election campaign for his party. On the day of his suicide, the television in his room showed a paused frame from a conference between Donald Tusk and the Minister of National Defence at 13:14. The caption on the news bar read: "It's time for the campaign to begin".

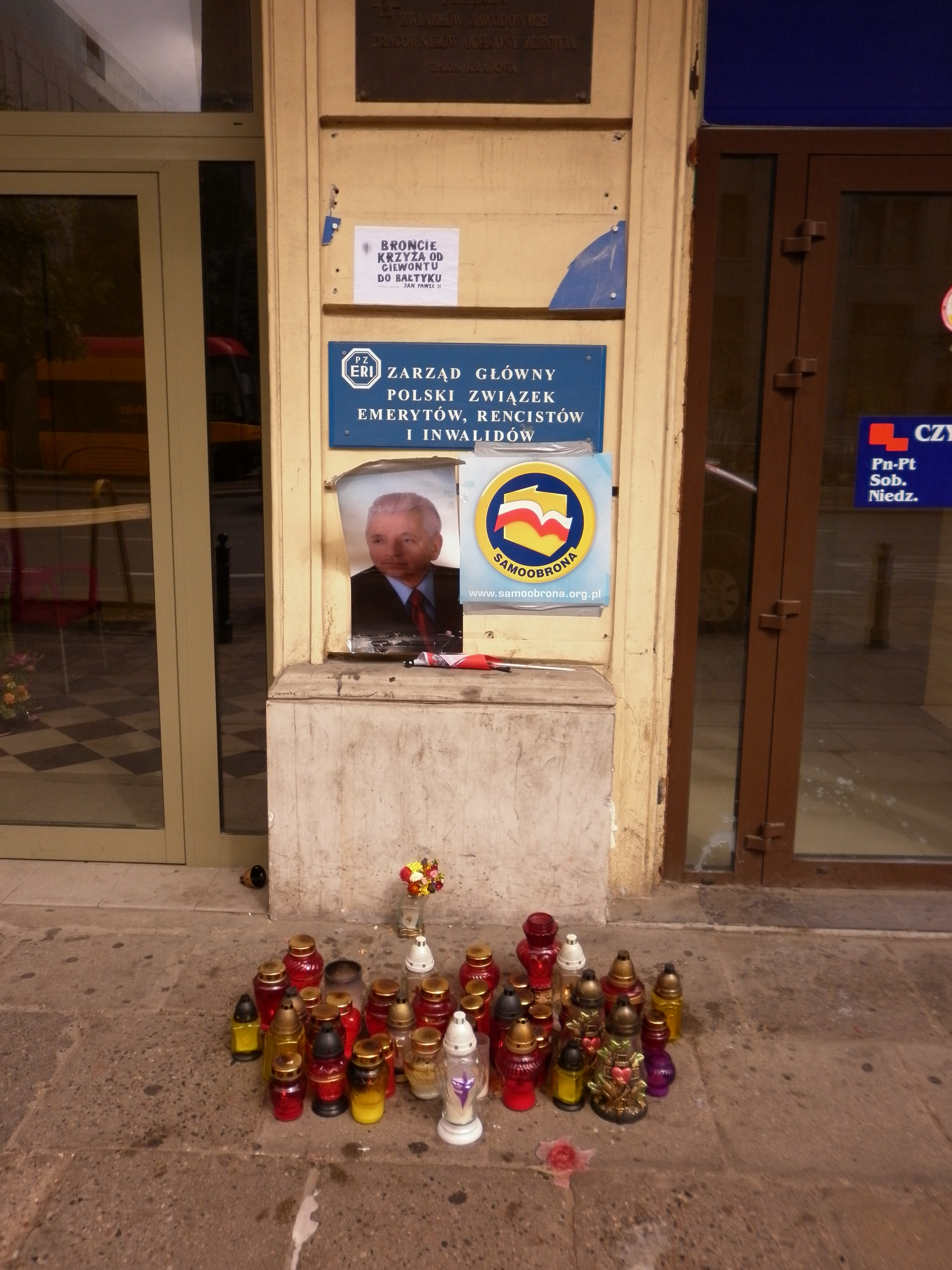
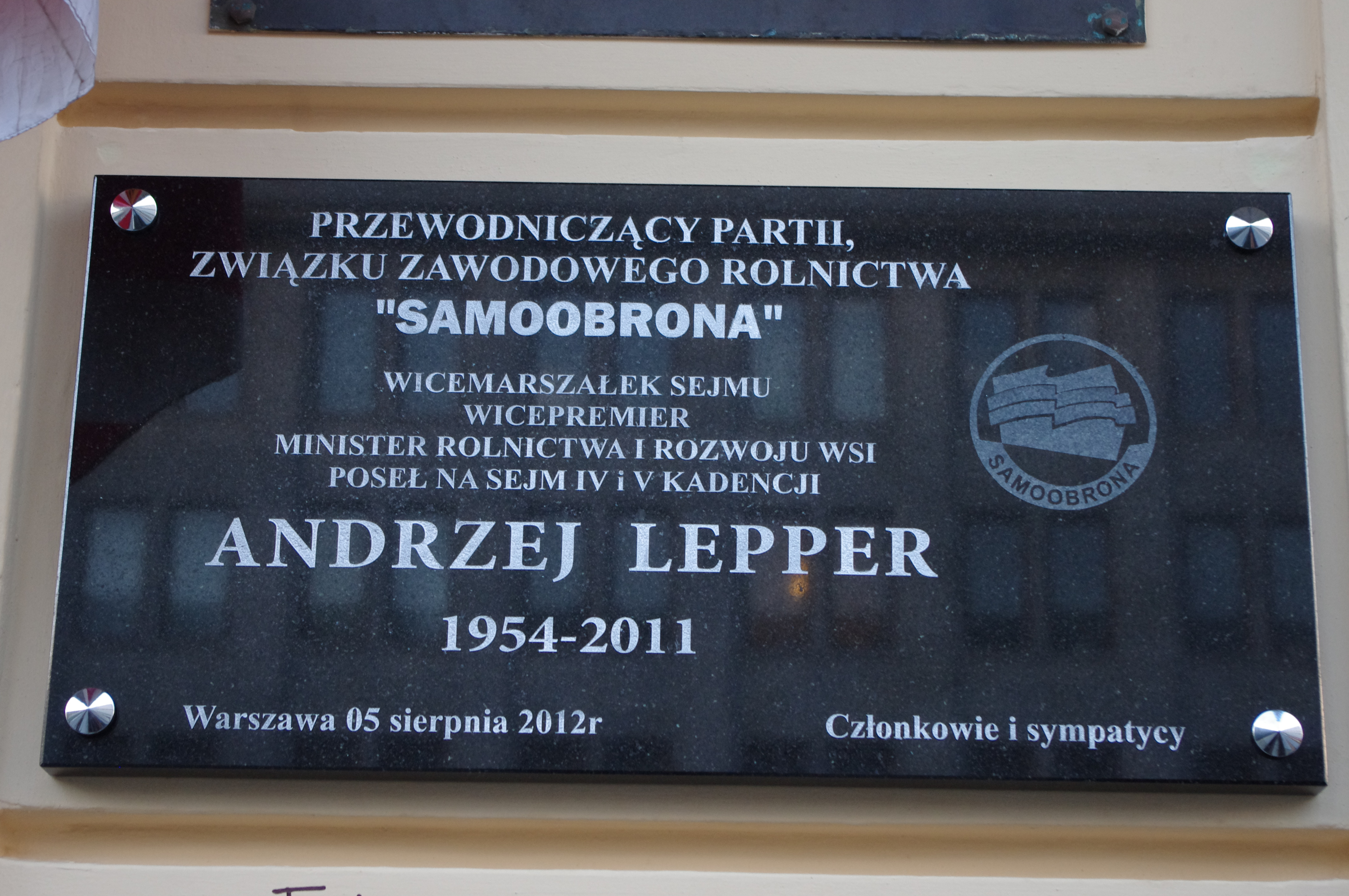
Memorial plaque of Andrzej Lepper in front of the headquarters of Samoobrona

In August 2011, news of the death of Andrzej Lepper reached the public. According to media reports, the leader of Samoobrona was to have hanged himself in his office, which was the party's headquarters. Before Lepper's funeral took place, the media eagerly reconstructed his last moments and the accompanying circumstances and alleged reasons for his suicide. Journalists' attention was particularly absorbed by the last hours of Lepper's life.

Death of Lepper remains a huge controversy, with the co-workers of Lepper insisting that he would not have killed himself. On the day of his suicide, Lepper arranged an interview with a journalist; the interviewer came to Lepper's headquarters at 14:00, but left after half an hour after repeatedly calling Lepper. Janusz Maksymiuk, a co-worker of Lepper, claims that he could not have committed suicide as Lepper asked him to prepare documents for his legal process several hours before his death. Some of the investigators of the Internal Security Agency also expressed doubts about Lepper's suicide, arguing that the circumstances of his death are "puzzling".

=== After 2011 ===
After Lepper's death, the political significance of the party greatly declined, even though formally the party still existed. The party was never able to recover from the loss of its leader, and did not develop further - Samoobrona's socio-economic program posted on its website is still signed by Andrzej Lepper, and the ideology of the party greatly narrowed to continuing the legacy of Lepper.

Political scientists and media highly speculated about the effect that Samoobrona's downfall had on Polish politics, with many speculating that most of the party's former voters went to right-wing populist Law and Justice. However, according to Radosław Markowski, roughly half of Samoobrona voters stopped voting in elections. Amongst the other half that continued voting, only a quarter switched to Law and Justice, while the majority went to social-democratic SLD and agrarian PSL. Markowski argues that amongst all political parties, it is PSL that benefited the most from the collapse of Samoobrona.

In September 2013, Samoobrona participated in a protest named "In defence of Syria!" The declaration of the protest stated: "I support Syria against the war that is being financed, rearmed and planned by Western forces and their allies in the region, opposing the expansion of imperialism in the Middle East. NOT the destruction of Syria. NO repetition of the imperialist invasion in Iraq and Libya! Victory for Syria!" The protest was supported by the Polish Communist Party.

In 2014, SLD gained a substantial number of the party's voters after the son of Andrzej Lepper, Tomasz Lepper, agreed to run on its electoral list. Tomasz Lepper failed to gain a seat, despite winning the highest share of votes in his powiat. In February 2016, the party signed a cooperation agreement with the ruling party in Belarus, Belaya Rus.

In 2018, a new political party AGROunia was founded, which is an agrarian socialist party aiming to appeal to farmers and rural voters disillusioned with Law and Justice. The leader of the party Michał Kołodziejczak called his party a spiritual successor to Samoobrona and openly admitted that his political career is inspired by Andrzej Lepper. Kołodziejczak argued that the downfall of Samoobrona left an empty space in Polish political scene and resulted in voters having no left-wing party to vote for, dismissing Lewica as "urban, secular left" that no longer represents the working class. He presented AGROunia as a "normal, real left, which represents trade unions, represents workers and demands their rights" and called Lepper a "prophet", stating: "Andrzej Lepper turned out to be a prophet of what will happen in Poland. What we see today - high prices, lack of housing, hard work that unfortunately does not equal a decent salary, and still the same bunch of thieves at the trough, which has not changed since then. Lepper talked about all this in detail, and he did it in a very effective way, which we appreciate very much today."

On 5 August 2023, the 12th anniversary of Lepper's death, Kołodziejczak visited the grave of Andrzej Lepper together with the remaining members of Samoobrona and announced a Samoobrona-AGROunia coalition for the 2023 Polish parliamentary election. Announcing a join electoral list with Samoobrona, Kołodziejczak argued: "Today it is necessary to avenge what Law and Justice did to Andrzej Lepper. This is one of the motives of the people who work and operate with us." He also released a statement praising Lepper and promising to uphold his legacy: "Let us forever remember him who, when others were turned away, stood up for the Poles and their rights. He was supremely brave, though many lacked decency and courage. He was honourable, among politicians without honour. He served Poland, though many served only themselves and big business. He was with us, true to principle, in a world full of hatred and betrayal."

The coalition fell apart on 16 August as AGROunia announced its cooperation with the Civic Coalition under the leadership of Donald Tusk and his Civic Platform. The alliance was formally announced during the National Council meeting of the Civic Platform. Polish political scientist Rafał Chwedoruk praised this decision, arguing that a coalition with AGROunia would help the Civic Platform appeal to rural voters, who hitherto considered the party elitist and urban-centric. Kołodziejczak argued that the coalition is necessary to prevent vote splitting and to ensure the defeat of the United Right government; Kołodziejczak stated: "No vote must go to waste, and we must show everyone in Poland that, despite our different views, we are looking in one direction - towards a future Poland that will be strong, rich and here people will build it together. This is what I am here for, I believe in it and I will do everything: we will win with PiS, we will take back the countryside from PiS".

The party registered an electoral list for the 2023 Polish parliamentary election, but did not field any candidates for the Sejm or Senate seats. On 13 October 2023, the chairman of the party Krzysztof Prokopczyk published a statement declaring that Samoobrona does not endorse any political party and asked its supporters and sympathizers to vote according to their own conscience. The party also encouraged its supporters to participate in the 2023 Polish referendum. Despite stating its neutrality, Samoobrona also made a remark referencing the 2005 Polish presidential election: "Samoobrona RP remembers how Andrzej Lepper, winning 15% of the vote in the presidential elections, handed it over to Lech Kaczyński, who won those elections. We all remember how it ended." This remark referenced the ill-fated PiS-LPR-Samoobrona government coalition that lasted from 2005 to 2007; by the 2007 Polish parliamentary election, PiS had expelled Samoobrona from the coalition and is credited with causing the electoral downfall of Samoobrona, as PiS effectively overshadowed Samoobrona's socialist appeal with its social populist rhetoric.

The party registered two electoral committees for the 2024 Polish local elections, one for Self-Defence of the Republic of Poland and another as just "Self-Defence"; the first committee only contested seats in the Masovian Voivodeship Sejmik, whereas the second one ran in 6 voivodeships. In Kruklanki, a local electoral committee "National Self-Defence of the Polish Fatherland" (Polish: Samoobrona Narodowa Ojczyzny Polski) was also registered; the name alludes to the Self-Defence of the Polish Nation, a right-wing split from Samoobrona that functioned between 2003 and 2023. In the 2024 Polish local elections, Self-Defence received 0.94% of the popular vote and won no seats in the voivodeship sejmiks. However, the party managed to win seats in municipal councils, winning seats in the Gmina Czastary, Gmina Igołomia-Wawrzeńczyce, Gmina Mielnik, Gmina Nurzec-Stacja, and Gmina Sokoły. The committee "National Self-Defence of the Polish Fatherland" also won the seat it contested in Kruklanki.

In the 2024 European Parliament election in Poland, the party registered an electoral committee, but did not field any candidates. On 28 May 2024, the party published its demands "10 priorities for Polish farming" and offered to endorse any candidate that signed it. The demands of the party included preventing trade liberalisation, objecting to raising taxes on agricultural products, and reforming or repealings parts of the European Green Deal. While Samoobrona did not directly participate in the election, a member of the party, Krzysztof Sarecki, ran on the list of a populist party Repair Poland Movement. He won 260 votes, and did not gain a seat.

On 5 August 2024, the 13th anniversary of Andrzej Lepper's death, the party wrote a letter to the prime minister Donald Tusk, asking him to intervene in the case of recompensation for Lepper's family. The relatives of Lepper requested that they be compensated from the government's Justice Fund (Polish: Fundusz Sprawiedliwości), as the former head and deputy head of the Central Anticorruption Bureau, Mariusz Kamiński and Maciej Wąsik, were convincted in 2023 for organizing an unlawful sting operation against Lepper in 2007. The Polish Minister of Justice Adam Bodnar did not answer the request, which led to Samoobrona announcing interventions at government offices, as well as protests outside the Ministry of Justice or the Prime Minister's Office as last resort.

In December 2024, another party aiming to be a successor of Samoobrona, the Self-Defence Rebirth of Andrzej Lepper (Polish: Samoobrona Odrodzenie Andrzeja Leppera) was founded in Lublin. The founders of the party include the members of the pro-Russian Polish Antiwar Movement (Polish: Polski Ruch Antywojenny), as well as former members of Samoobrona. According to Rzeczpospolita, the creation of the party is associated with a larger revival of interest in Andrzej Lepper - since 2022, Polish rural trade unions have been organizing popular campaign to build a monument to Andrzej Lepper, and mainstream parties such as Konfederacja have been requesting to relaunch the investigation into Lepper's death, which many speculate to be murder than suicide.

On 25 January 2025, Samoobrona held party congress on which it announced its own candidate for the 2025 Polish presidential election - Aldona Anna Skirgiełło. Skirgiełło is a Polish farmer living in Podlasie that became famous through her appearance in the TTV series "Wives of Podlasie" (Polish: Żony Podlasia), where she played a star role. It was the first time since 2010 that the party fielded its own candidate. Skirgiełło presented an anti-capitalist, socially conservative and pro-Russian program, including declarations to protect "traditional Christian values" and to introduce mandatory parliamentary representation for ethnic and religious minorities in Poland. When asked about her prospect of victory, she stated: "I won't win the election anyway, but I will stir things up." However, despite a well-publicized candidacy, Skirgiełło did not manage to gather the 100,000 signatures needed to appear on the ballot on time. At the day of the deadline, 4 April, she narrowly fell short, having gathered around 93,000 signatures. Skirgiełło declared that she does not plan to step down from politics, and instead plans to work on expanding party structures and building a voter base for parliamentary elections. She attributed her unsuccessful run to Samoobrona being "weakened by external influences that are destroying it". Following Skirgiełło's failure, on 16 May 2025, Samoobrona endorsed an independent candidate supported by Law and Justice, Karol Nawrocki. However, Skirgiełło herself endorsed Grzegorz Braun, the candidate of the Confederation of the Polish Crown, instead.

== Ideology ==
Samoobrona espouses protectionist, nationalist and socialist views, representing a synthesis of the Polish peasant movement, Catholic social teaching and the socialist tradition of the Polish People's Republic. It is considered a radical, agrarian and populist party representing the interests of social groups impoverished by the capitalist transition; it appeals to the nostalgia for communist Poland, particularly the era of Edward Gierek and the communitarian way of life from that period, represented by institutions such as the State Agricultural Farms. Samoobrona is classified as a far-left party based on the poorest economic classes, and has explicitly communist origins. It is widely considered socialist - political scientists such as Sarah de Lange, Gerrit Voerman, Klaus Bachmann and Rafał Pankowski also described the party as socialist. The party was described as socialist by the media as well, such as the Gość Niedzielny, Newsweek Polska, and The Guardian. The party is Eurosceptic, anti-globalization and opposes USA, which it accuses of 'colonizing' Poland.

The party's leadership had a strongly national communist background, and apart from Party X and National Party "Fatherland", Samoobrona became the main party to which the national communist wing of the Polish United Workers' Party found refuge in. Former members of the communist security service had prominent positions in the party, serving as party activists and Lepper's advisors; the party espoused a "clear nostalgia for the former regime", identifying Polish socialism with stability and social welfare. Samoobrona's leadership included several prominent figures from the Endocommunist Patriotic Union Grunwald and the former communist party’s nationalist hard-line faction — notably Edward Kowalczyk, who had been a deputy premier in the martial law government. Jarosław Tomasiewicz described the party's ideology as "diluted National Bolshevism", given the party's strongly nationalist but also communist appeal. Samoobrona openly called for a restoration of communism in Poland.

The socialism of the party was subclassed by some political scientists and the media - Sarah de Lange classified the party as agrarian socialist, while others also described the party as Christian socialist. Other classifications include "farmer socialism", and "peasant socialism" comparable to that of István Csurka, described as a mixture of "ultra-left-wing" and nationalist elements. Samoobrona was also described as socialist-populist, and compared to the Communist Party of Slovakia in that regard. Additionally, the party was described as patriotic socialist as to encompass the nationalist and socialist nature of the party, as well as to fit the party's self-description; Samoobrona describes itself as "patriotic left". Similarly, Jarosław Tomasiewicz described Samoobrona as socialist nationalist, classifying the party as one of the post-communist successors of the Polish United Workers' Party, explaining that Samoobrona became the party national communists found refuge in. The party rejects capitalism altogether and demands state-funded agriculture, expansive social programs, an end to repayments of the foreign debt, additional transaction taxes and the use of financial reserves to obtain funding, as well as the nationalisation of foreign capital. Samoobrona consistently emphasised its left-wing identity, referring to itself as "patriotic, progressive and modern left", "national left", "Catholic left", and also "socialist left". The party's leader Andrzej Lepper stated that "the traditions from which Samoobrona draws are the pre-war Polish Socialist Party and the Polish People's Party "Wyzwolenie", so the parties of the patriotic left, that this grassroots movement of Poles who have been wronged for 20 years wants to represent on the Polish political scene".

Samoobrona has been described as left-wing, "ultra-leftist", "left-nationalist", left-agrarian, populist, "combining socialism and agrarian populism", "radical peasant", "leftist-populist" and "populist-nationalist". Polish political scientist Olga Wysocka describes Samoobrona as "social populists (.. .) [who] combine socialism and populism, and represent a form of left-wing populism". Leaders and members of the party generally described Samoobrona as a broad patriotic social movement based on Catholic social teaching, with some using labels such as "left-patriotic", "patriotic", "progressive", "nationalist" and even "genuinely centrist" as well. Andrzej Lepper himself ultimately described himself as left-wing, stating "I have always been and will always be a man of the left". Marek Borowski, a left-wing politician, criticised Samoobrona as a "political chameleon", but described the party as socialist and nationalist. Describing the Polish political scene of 2006, the Leibniz Institute of Agricultural Development in Transition Economies classified Samoobrona as the leading "populist left wing" party. German political scientist Nikolaus Werz described Samoobrona as an anti-globalization and anti-capitalist party that promotes protectionist, socialist and nationalist policies, combined with "a noticeable nostalgia for the People's Republic of Poland". Sociologist Heinrich Best described the party as "extreme populists and proponents of radical welfarism (...) and state socialism". In news reports, the party was consistently described as socialist - New York Times described Samoobrona as a leftist party which was "a conglomeration of farmers and socialists who favor continued heavy state subsidies", whose leader Andrzej Lepper "combined socialist policies with populist rhetoric". Conversely, Slate described the party's ideology as a "frightening mixture of nationalism and socialism".

Political scientists of both English-language and Polish-language literature also described the party as far-left. Paul G. Lewis and Zdenka Mansfeldová categorised Samoobrona as a post-communist Eastern European party with communist and socialist leanings, comparing it to the Communist Party of Bohemia and Moravia, Hungarian Labour Party and the Communist Party of Slovakia. Polish political scientist Andrzej Antoszewski argues that the postulates of Samoobrona are consistent with those of other neocommunist parties, although the party shows unique ethical socialist and Christian socialist leanings not found in other far-left parties of Eastern Europe. The party's program proposes a 'great national programme of economic revival', marked by a retreat from "satanic values" defined as the pursuit of maximum profits, getting rich, ruthless competition, degenerate consumerism, total commercialisation and contempt for the weak. The party also calls for the abandonment of "savage capitalism, the free market, fiscal terror and monetarist-bank parasitism"; Antoszewski described this rhetoric as particularly characteristic of neo-communist parties.

Ryszard Herbut compares Samoobrona to a fellow far-left populist and agrarian party Union of the Workers of Slovakia - both parties praised "the economic and social principles of communism (while verbally dissociating itself from some of the mistakes of the past), criticised the capitalist development model adopted after 1989, negatively assessed the process of political, economic and military integration of Europe and protested against globalisation". Samoobrona was known for its positive attitude towards Communist Poland; Sławomir Drelich called the party "the most post-communist party on the Polish political scene". Bartek Pytlas argues that Samoobrona did not draw back to historical nationalist parties and movements in its political tradition, but rather looked to communist Poland and continued its socialist legacy. At the same time, the party sought to define itself as Catholic.

Some media reports tended to call Samoobrona right-wing, often to equate it with the League of Polish Families, a fellow anti-establishment and populist party in Poland. However, most political scientists classified Samoobrona as left-wing. Sarah de Lange and Gerrit Voerman stated that Samoobrona formed a distinct form of left-wing populism and agrarian socialism, drifting towards conventional left in the mid-2000s. Comparing Samoobrona to the League of Polish Families, Rafał Pankowski argued that Samoobrona voters were most concerned about economic hardship and supported the party over economic issues, while the right-wing LPR attracted motivated by nationalist values instead; LPR supporters were by far, the most religious group of all Polish party constituencies, while supporters of Samoobrona reported the lowest income. Olga Wysocka also points out that Samoobrona aspired to be a "voice of the disadvantaged", and focused on economic issues.

Political alignment of post-1989 Polish political parties on a two-dimensional spectrum. Samoobrona is coded as SRP.

The party stated its commitment to Catholic social teaching and opposed the legalisation of euthanasia, abortion and soft drugs. However, Samoobrona temporarily supported legalising same-sex partnerships in Poland and animal welfare, ultimately undermining its agrarian image and changing the stance of nationalist circles towards it from ambivalent to hostile. Karol Kostrzębski argues that Samoobrona had much more in common with other post-communist left-wing parties than right-wing ones such as LPR or PiS, classifying as a staunchly left-wing party. Kostrzębski also highlights that Samoobrona was heavily involved in trade unions, was the most popular party amongst Polish unionised workers and called for abolition of capitalism. Polish columnist Marek Migalski classifies Samoobrona as a left-wing "populist-etatist" party, while Polish political scientist Andrzej Antoszewski places Samoobrona among the Central European extreme left and "neo-communist" groupings, although at the same time he emphasises that Samoobrona is the only case in this group with a non-communist origin. Tadeusz Piskorski highlights that in the 2000s Samoobrona transitioned from a protest party to a "stabilised left-wing party", which competed with other left-wing parties for voters. In a 2005 survey of Samoobrona members, over 50% identified as politically left-wing, while only 26% members identified as right-wing.

Rafał Pankowski classified Samoobrona as a left-wing populist party that utilised anti-globalisation and anti-liberal rhetoric to appeal to those left behind by the Polish transition to capitalism and integration with Western markets. Pankowski wrote: "it was first of all a voice of social protest against liberalism, appealing to those who were economically worse off as a result of the capitalist transition". While researching the party and its ideology in the 2000s, Ola Wysocka recalls: "in 2006 at the V National Congress of Self-Defence, I asked members of the party to indicate who the party represented. Most of them pointed to “the people”. When prompted to be more specific, they added “disadvantaged people”".

Poland's June 2003 referendum on membership of the European Union was an uncomfortable experience for Samoobrona. On one hand, the party's isolationism and Euroscepticism led it to call officially for a "no" vote. In 2002, the party even declared: "When they are in the European Union, the Poles will be slaves. They will wipe the buttocks of German women or else sweep the streets of this country." On the other hand, most political observers believed (correctly) that the Polish would vote in favour of membership, and as a populist party Samoobrona was unhappy about the likelihood of being on the losing side. In the end, the party fought a rather ambiguous campaign, with its posters carrying the slogan "the decision belongs to you". As a result, Andrzej Lepper promoted a flexible stance on the European Union where he often criticised the organisation, yet was not inherently opposed to joining it; he explained:

I have never said we are against the integration because of any threats to Catholic faith or to national identity. We are not like the LPR who incite fear of such things among people. My point is that the conditions for membership as negotiated by the government are unfavourable. That is why we are going to adopt a negative position on the accession at the congress. However, we do not call anybody to vote “No”. Our slogan is “The choice is yours”.

In 2005, Samoobrona was a founding member of the EUDemocrats (EUD) European political party, which professes to unite "EU-critical" parties committed to increased democratization and decentralization. The EUDemocrats' political platform argued that European integration was leading Europe towards a centralised unitary state. Integration was seen as the consequence of a permissive consensus of "furtive elites who had blindfolded citizens". The party sought to restore the principle of subsidiarity, believing that too much had already been ceded to the EU and had to be recovered. It promoted the concept of "flexible integration", which would allow countries to use enhanced cooperation procedures only when they wished, without the possibility of forcing cooperation on all members. Only "truly cross-border issues" were to be dealt with at the EU level, defined as guaranteeing the four fundamental freedoms and a common environmental policy. In its program, the EUD also wanted to exclude several policy areas from the competences of the EU, notably common trade policy, education, cultural policy and common foreign policy. The party was described as presenting a position of "minimalist Eurorealism", seeking to transform the EU into a free trade area with minimal supranational competences. A cooperation agreement between states was to replace the EU Constitution, with the option for states to opt for a simple free trade agreement without other EU obligations. The party was concerned about parliamentary control, the environment and minimum social standards, and strongly distrusted any European military role. It was seen as a key statement of left-wing Euroscepticism, in line with Samoobrona's political position.

Political alignment of Polish parties by political scientists Seongcheol Kim and Endre Borbáth. Samoobrona is coded as SRP, and occupies a socioeconomically far-left and socioculturally conservative position.

Samoobrona sought support from these social groups that found themselves impoverished in the new capitalist, post-community Polish economy. As such, low-skilled workers, those living in rural or impoverished areas and unemployed were the main base of the party. The support of the party was strongest in rural and agricultural areas. Samoobrona failed to win the support of strongly conservative constituencies, and a significant number of Samoobrona were left-wing or formerly socialist. Agricultural and blue-collar workers built the backbone of the party's voting base, while white-collar workers generally held negative views of the party. A correlation to religion was also found - devout Catholics were much more likely to vote for Samoobrona than atheists or those with ambiguous attitude towards religion. The party's electorate was overwhelmingly left-wing as Samoobrona appealed to groups that felt alienated by all other political parties - this included left-wing Eurosceptics and the poorest layers of Polish society. The electorate of Samoobrona was much more left-wing than that of any other Polish political party and non-voters.

Through its radical populism and confrontational, direct action in "protection of the "poor and the disadvantaged", Samoobrona distinguished itself as a party that appealed to the "losers" of the capitalist transition. Samoobrona was labeled as a radical populist-left party and focused on socio-economic issues, sidelining religious and cultural aspects in favor of targeting socially marginalized and economically struggling groups. The party was considered "anti-elitist, anti-institutional, anti-procedural and de facto anti-democratic, in the sense attached to democracy in liberal representative democracies". While some political commentators disparagingly called Samoobrona "a party of losers" and claimed that it was mainly supported by failed entrepreneurs and unsuccessful middle class, the party was mostly supported by the "excluded, lost, and helpless". Samoobrona had a similar voter base with the far-right League of Polish Families, with both parties being overwhelmingly supported by poor rural voters and other groups languishing under free market reforms. However, whereas support for the League of Polish Families was strongly determined by church attendance, support for Samoobrona was determined by low income instead.

=== Economics ===
Samoobrona was "unambiguously left-wing" on economic issues. It had a protectionist attitude toward the country's economy and wanted to take higher custom tariffs on foreign goods. The Party opted for controlling of Narodowy Bank Polski by Sejm. Additionally, the party's leader Andrzej Lepper was in favor of reintroducing PGRs which were state-owned and controlled homesteads existing during the communist era in Poland. Samoobrona called itself "the voice of all social groups which, as a result of the reforms of the 1990s, have found themselves on the edge of poverty and despair" and in 2002, Andrzej Lepper stated: "I am the voice of the poor, deprived and humiliated … Self-Defence and Andrzej Lepper never were, are not, and never will be ‘them’. We are ‘us’." Samoobrona became famous for its disdain towards the minister that carried out a neoliberal transformation of Polish economy into a capitalist one, Leszek Balcerowicz; Samoobrona coined the slogan "Balcerowicz must go" (Polish: Balcerowicz musi odejść"), and denounced Balcerowicz as "the greatest pest, destroyer, traitor".

The party also expressed vehement opposition to capitalism, stating that "capitalism is the primacy of capital and profit over labour and man" and arguing that "capitalism is that system which has already outlived itself". Lepper declared that Samoobrona was an anti-capitalist party, arguing that capitalism results in "degenerate consumerism". Samoobrona stated that it desires "a strong state that will deservedly command the respect of all citizens, as a guarantor of their security, and thus create a structure with which they will want to identify". The party promotes an economic program that mixes agrarianism with economic nationalism, socialism, and religious elements. Central to the party's economic agenda is its complete rejection of capitalism - Samoobrona rejects both commerce and the market itself. According to Vít Hloušek and Lubomír Kopeček, the program of the party also incorporates anarchist elements. The party is very close ideologically to radical left-wing agrarian formations from the era of Second Polish Republic. Rhetorically, Samoobrona also includes a strongly Catholic moralist message, calling for a return of supposedly abandoned Catholic and humanitarian values, and wishes to fight "satanic" values in society such as consumerism.

According to Luke March, the party promoted a radical anti-globalisation and anti-neoliberal rhetoric and closely embraced trade unions, with the resulting economic program being an agrarian socialist and left-wing populist vision. Samoobrona promoted a highly interventionist system and wanted to replace materialism and consumerism with a closer relationship with the natural environment, including "the preservation of small-scale family farms and a humane treatment of animals". Party members made reference to terms such as "eco-development" and "econology", which aimed to promote ecology, Catholic ethics and morality in both economics and politics. The main concept of the party's economic ideology was social justice; in its 1999 manifesto the party stated: "We want a Poland, in which there will not be such drastic material differences: no so-called ‘ocean of destitution’ with tiny islands of wealth and well-being".

In 1994, the program of Samoobrona stated: "Capitalism is not a perpetual system. It must give way to new concepts of human relations, to a new ecological morality. A new post-capitalist era is already being born". The postulates of Andrzej Lepper and his party were egalitarian, emphasising above all the need for a fair redistribution of wealth and the subordination of the economy and its mechanisms to serve social and common good. The party strongly demanded state intervention in the economy, and stressed the need to apply protectionist customs aimed at protecting the interests of domestic producers. Lepper argued that in the light of the experience of capitalist countries, it was dangerous to "succumb to dogmatic thinking consisting in an unwavering belief in the superiority of capitalist free market mechanisms in all areas of economic life". Samoobrona argued that the adherence of post-communist Polish governments to dogmatic capitalism had led to the abandonment of the basic tasks of the state and the violation of essential human rights.

The party is generally considered to have been the most critical, and even negative, of the post-1989 transition into a market economy. Samoobrona strongly opposed deregulation and privatisation, and wanted to reverse these actions. Samoobrona also promoted anti-globalization rhetoric, believing that neoliberal economics first and foremost serves the international financial institutions and leads to a situation where "a few hundred companies in the world want to dominate everything". Referring to the Marxist doctrine, Lepper believed that "he who has power has ownership of the means of production". The party believed that public ownership should have supremacy over any kind of private property, arguing that "private property cannot be treated as privileged, sacred and inviolable". The party also proposed restoration of state monopolies, including total state ownership of raw materials, mining industries, the energy sector, armaments, transport infrastructure, banking and insurance, as well as lottery, spirits and tobacco industry, regarded by the party as important sources of budget revenue.

Samoobrona attributed great importance to trade unions and cooperatives, arguing that its heritage dating back to the 19th century was destroyed in 1990. The party accused Polish politicians of destroying Polish cooperatives, including entities with such long-standing traditions as "Społem" and "Samopomoc Chłopska", arguing that individual governments did not try to counteract the discriminatory practices applied to cooperatives by banks and other institutions. Co-operatives, according to Samoobrona, should benefit from fiscal facilities and the state should undertake the task of stimulating the dying co-operative movement. Samoobrona argued that trade unions and rural cooperatives are to fulfill a very important economic role, and credited these groups with enforcing several pro-worker reforms in Western countries.

One of the key properties of the party's economic ideology was its positive assessment of socialism and communism. Lepper believed that there is no point in "ritual condemnations of Soviet Communism" and argued that the atrocities of Joseph Stalin should be seen as degeneration of communist doctrine rather than the result of it. In regards to the Polish People's Republic, Lepper stated: "...I do not agree (...) that those 45 years were lost for Poland, that today we are starting from scratch". The party had a particularly high opinion of Edward Gierek's rule, which was regarded as a time of modernisation based on Western models. The intransigent critics of the communist period, located in the Law and Justice party and the Solidarity movement, were described by Samoobrona as "extreme right-wing". Mirosław Karwat considered Samoobrona to be "probably the only political party that speaks well of Communist Poland".

=== Social issues ===
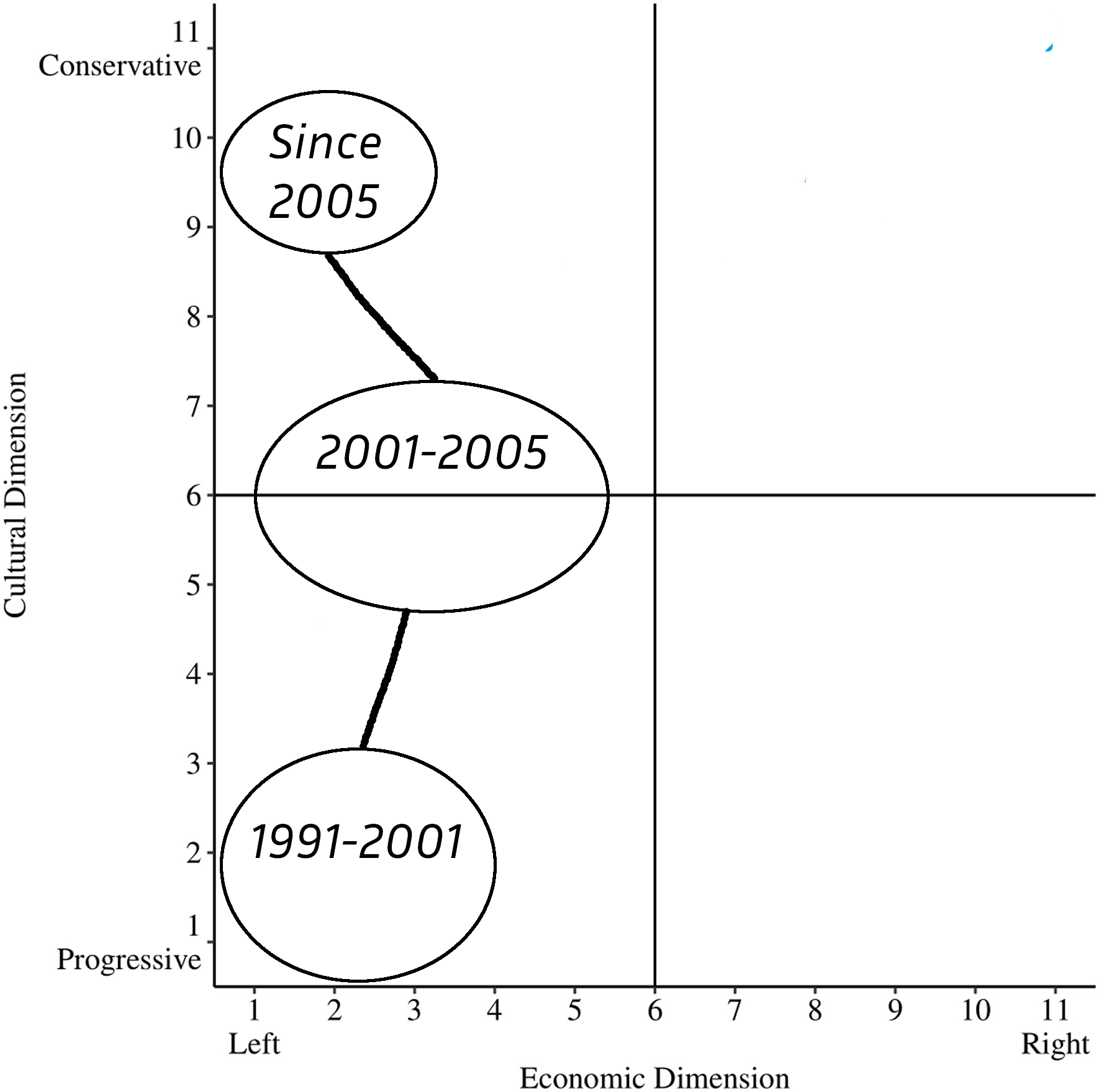
Ideological evolution of Samoobrona - since 2001, Samoobrona has been shifting towards social conservatism, making a coalition with LPR possible.

Samoobrona was socially conservative. It was argued to espouse "a kind of social conservatism" similar to one of Polish communists of the late 1980s, represented by the Patriotic Movement for National Rebirth. Political scientists Michael Minkenberg and Pascal Perrineau noted that part of Samoobrona's agrarian appeal and "common-man" identity was built on nationalism, "cultural traditionalism" and authoritative protectionism. According to Sarah L. de Lange and Simona Guerra, Samoobrona "takes a position on the cultural dimension that is only slightly less extreme than that of the LPR", with LPR being a far-right party. Samoobrona was also described as left-conservative. German newspaper Junge Freiheit described the party's positions as follows:

This makes the modified Samoobrona programme all the more appealing. With its penchant for state intervention in the economy, vehement rejection of foreign investment and support for farmers and craftspeople, it is stealing points from the SLD on the left. On the right, however, it is catching up with its rejection of abortion and euthanasia, its fight against the legalisation of drugs and its campaign for the publication of all secret service archives from the pre-transition period. For those who are still undecided politically, it is offering the immediate withdrawal of Polish troops from Iraq and the introduction of a professional army.

There had been a gradual shift in party's views on social issues. Throughout the 1990s, Samoobrona combined its far-left socioeconomic postulates with social progressivism. This culminated in Samoobrona becoming an ally of the social-democratic SLD before and shortly after the 2001 election. As a reward, SLD voted in favor of Lepper becoming the Deputy Marshal of the Sejm. While in power, SLD embraced neoliberalism and pursued deregulation and market liberalization - it suspended collective agreements and allowed for a suspension of working regulations "where the existence of a firm is threatened", cut overtime pay, made it easier for employers to fire workers, and reduced sickness pay. It also implemented "Hausner Plan", named after its Finance Minister Jerzy Hausner, who abolished the annual rise in pensions and public service pay, cut business tax, reduced subsidies for mines and railways, cut sickness allowance, cut subsidies for companies employing disabled workers and increased retirement age for women. This liberal economic time made the PSL, SLD's coalition partner, leave the coalition. As a minority government, SLD continued its shift, with Leszek Miller, the leader of the SLD-led minority government, proposing to implement a flat-income tax rate. This made Samoobrona break off with the SLD, and SLD retaliated by removing Lepper as the Deputy Marshal.

Afterwards, Samoobrona gradually moved away from social progressivism and started approaching social conservatism. After the 2005 Polish parliamentary election, Samoobrona further moved towards the cultural right, and became a left-authoritarian party. It strongly opposed abortion and "legalisation of homosexual relationships and their adoption of children". After the 2005 election, it was described as far-left socioeconomically and centre-right culturally. From 2006 onwards, Samoobrona was also described as a left-wing, but "radical socially conservative" party. While in government coalition, SRP participated in formulating a conserative school curriculum that banned addressing homosexuality and only referred to traditional heterosexual families. For the PiS-Samoobrona-LPR, LGBT community became the core "other", and was criticized from both a nationalist and moral perspective. The coalition's vision was that maintaining and reinforcing Catholic values in Polish society was obstructed by LGBT people. In 2006, the party In 2006, together with the PSL and LPR, Samoobrona proposed to add an amendment to the Polish Constitution which would enforce legal protection of human life from the moment of conception, criminalizing abortion in every circumstance.

The problem of sexual minorities was sometimes consciously marginalised by Samoobrona politicians; it was argued that some left-wing formations gave it too much importance, and thus pushed far more important issues concerning the social and economic rights of the majority of citizens into the background. Initially, Samoobrona was declared in its party platform to legalize civil unions to same-sex couples. Alongside SLD it was the only party who voted in favor of a bill embracing civil unions in 2004. At the same time, Lepper stated that Samoobrona strongly opposes same-sex marriage and allowing same-sex couples to adopt children, stating: "I have nothing against homosexuals, but we must not allow homosexual unions to be legalized, and especially we must not allow them to raise children. You can't avoid this topic. But Samoobrona does not agree that people of the same sex should enter into marriage." However, Samoobrona then shifted its stance, stating its opposition to same-sex civil unions, and especially objecting to the possibility of allowing same-sex couples to adopt children. In 2003, Andrzej Lepper summed up the party's outlook on abortion and LGBT as follows:

I am speaking clearly on behalf of the Samoobrona Party: Samoobrona will never support any project that aims to take a life. We are in favour of protecting life in all its forms, from conception to natural death. We will also not support any same-sex marriages. We understand the problem. They are people, some of them ill, some of them have chosen other friends of the same sex. We understand that, but we will not allow it to be sanctioned. There must be some tolerance, but it must not be sanctioned. It is incompatible with our faith, our ethics and our programme.

Samoobrona argued that the values of the Catholic Church should be embedded in the Polish education and law; consequently, the party opposed abortion, euthanasia and decriminalization of drugs such as marijuana. It opposed death penalty, likewise citing the need to follow Catholic social teaching. As a part of its anti-abortion stance, the party advocated for full protection of life from conception to natural death as a constitutional provision. In 2005, one of demands to President-elect Lech Kaczyński was to add this provision, together with implementing minimum subsistence benefits for the unemployed, abolishing taxes for incomes below the subsistence level, and withdrawing Polish troops from Iraq.

The party also opposed decommunization policies, with both members and supporters of Samoobrona being most opposed to decommunization out of all parties. In October 2002, Samoobrona passed a bill that exempted communist intelligence and counter-intelligence collaborators from lustration (exclusion from civil service positions). This made the party be considered as the "most post-communist" party in Polish politics.

Samoobrona is anti-immigration. Although it has repeatedly been accused of nationalist or even xenophobic tendencies, the party did not devote much space in its public activities to the issue of national and ethnic minorities. The understanding of the nation preferred by the party leaders was not ethnocentric and exclusivist in nature; the national community was treated as "a collectivity constituted by ties of culture, tradition and history, and not by common origin". Lepper argued for the necessity of equal rights for all minorities with other Polish citizens, deeming property claims based on nationality to be unjustified. In 2007, Samoobrona proposed to recognize the Silesian language as an official regional language in Poland. Starting in the early 2000s, Lepper also became a spokesman for the Belarusian minority in Poland, pledging to fight for the subsidies taken away from the Belarusian Socio-Cultural Association as part of the austerity measures imposed by the Polish government. He argued that the development of ethnic minorities in Poland is endangered as they had no chance of survival in the absence of adequate funding. Lepper also stated that Samoobrona wants to be an advocate for national minorities, which sparked speculation in the media that Samoobrona wants to replace other left-wing parties in the role of an advocate for Polish minorities. This was reflected by Samoobrona becoming the preferred party of the Ukrainian minority in Poland. The regionalist wing split off from Samoobrona in 2007, creating the Party of Regions.

The party also spoke in favour of gender equality while in the Sejm, although it saw the issue as a purely socioeconomic one. In 2004, Samoobrona's member of parliament Włodzimierz Czechowski said:

The circumstances for family development are so stressful and harmful nowadays that we should be surprised anyone is still having children. Being laid off is a failure and loss of one's life's work, the dissolution and pathology of the family. It's only thanks to the wisdom of Polish women that impoverished families haven't started selling their children yet. Dear ladies! It's not men who discriminate against women, it's Poland's nasty liberal policy, which results in unemployment levels unheard of in Europe. Isn't it hypocrisy to appoint special institutions that fight for women's right without taking care of the country's economic development? The legal system is discriminating against you, women. Subsidies, child support and welfare payments have been fixed at below the biological minimum.

Ideological alignment of 2007 Polish political parties. Both Samoobrona and LPR were far-left on socioeconomic issues, and right-leaning on sociocultural ones.

In regards to electoral law, the party was a staunch supporter of proportional representation. Samoobrona spoke on 2000s attempts to reform the Polish electoral law by right-wing Law and Justice (PiS); in July 2006, PiS submitted the electoral reform to the Speaker of the Sejm - the law introduced blocks of lists in municipalities with over 20 000 inhabitants, with the simultaneous application of the d'Hondt method in the intra-group distribution of votes for seats and the rule that groups of lists which received at least 10% of the validly cast votes could participate in the distribution of seats at all levels of local government elections. This law was criticised for undeservedly favouring the strongest parties of the bloc, giving them a significant over-representation in future councils and assemblies. Despite forming a coalition government with PiS at the time, Samoobrona also opposed this law, and called for abandonment of the D'Hondt method in favour of a more proportional apportionment method; Sainte-Laguë method used in the 2001 Polish parliamentary election was seen as the best and more proportional alternative at the time.

The party was considered to have some disdain for democracy. This was expressed through Lepper's remark that "There's too much talk about democracy - people can see it's only for elites. Only 5% of the population have made any money out of it at the expense of all the others. People have had enough..." While Samoobrona was considered anti-institutional, anti-procedural and anti-democratic, its opposition to democracy specifically applied to opposing liberal democracy in particular. The party called Polish regime a "sham democracy" that they portrayed as a de facto oligarchy, where "Poles voted for different parties and still Balcerowicz popped out of the ballot box". Samoobrona proposed a new parliamentary form of democracy where the president would be elected by universal suffrage but limited by a special "presidential council" appointed by the parliament. Polish Senate was to be replaced with a special, socio-professional chamber consisting of local governments and trade unions. Lastly, Samoobrona emphasized the need to introduce local self-government, especially to culturally unique regions and nations such as Silesia and Kashubia.

=== Foreign policy ===
One of the leading demands of Samoobrona in the field of foreign policy was the demand for its full economisation. This process was to involve a move away from ideological principles to a calculation based solely on estimating the benefits of trade with specific countries. The political assessment of a foreign economic partner was not to be given any importance; the only binding criterion for assessing foreign policy should be the growth of Polish exports and the possibilities for Polish entities to derive financial benefits. Samoobrona opposed integration of Poland into EU and NATO, and instead promoted strong relationship with Russia, Belarus and China. The party called for defence of Polish sovereignty from international corporations and financial institutions, seeing them as instruments of foreign interests. Samoobrona denounced the European Union as a form of colonialism, and instead promoted autarky. It warned against Polish membership in the EU, arguing that Poland would become "a third-class country, and in a semi-colonial way, a provider of young workers for the ageing EU societies and a market for the production surpluses of the EU countries".

An additional, complementary field of action for diplomacy was to combat negative stereotypes of Poles in other countries, described by Samoobrona as anti-Polish. According to the party, it should be the duty of Polish diplomats, as well as politicians sitting in the European Parliament, to oppose negative stereotypes and historical falsifications, such as the use of the phrase "Polish concentration camps" in foreign journalism. An important role as ambassador of Polish interests abroad was attributed to the Polish diasporas scattered around the world. It was postulated that Polish diasporas should be covered by state aid and be given the opportunity to return to their homeland. Samoobrona supported a bill providing the possibility for representatives of the Polish minority abroad to obtain Karta Polaka, arguing that the survival of Polish culture and language should be a reason for respect for Poles living abroad. The repatriation operation of Kazakhstan residents of Polish origin also met with the party's support.

Many authors and commentators, both Polish and foreign ones, considered Self-Defence of the Republic of Poland to be a Eurosceptic party. This was due to the party's protectionist and nationalist program, which many commentators considered Eurosceptic by nature. According to some authors, labelling Samoobrona as a Eurosceptic party was legitimate given opinion polls, which showed that in terms of opposition to Poland's accession to the EU, Samoobrona were only slightly less hostile to EU than the LPR voters. However, while for the LPR the issue of European integration was one of the most important ones, in the case of Samoobrona, the issue of EU did not play an important role.

Lepper argued that Samoobrona's criticism of the EU accession was exclusively related to the conditions of Poland's membership in the Union, and not a negation of the purposefulness of integration processes as such. The basis of Samoobrona's position was based on a set of beliefs characteristic of the so-called economic Euroscepticism. The party's declared pragmatism in assessing the consequences of possible membership was characteristic, and the inconsistency of views and assessments on European integration was most likely linked to the existence of diverse attitudes on the issue among both party members and supporters themselves, which became particularly evident after 1 May 2004, when some Samoobrona members became beneficiaries of the EU Common Agricultural Policy. Because of the lack of decisive and conclusive enunciations on Poland's membership in the Union, J. Sielski described the party's position on European integration as "Euro-populist".

The leader of Samoobrona himself preferred to call his stance on Poland's participation in the European integration process "Eurorealism", and directed his criticism of the unfavourable provisions of the Accession Treaty at Polish governments and negotiators rather than European Commission officials. According to Piskorski, given the presence of a number of features which would indeed make it possible to classify the party into the Eurorealist camp (an ambivalent attitude to the accession, the secondary role of this issue in programme pronouncements, variability of rhetoric resulting from the assessment of the mood of the electorate), "such self-identification seems to be largely justified".

The party took a moderately sceptical stance on the introduction of a common European currency in Poland. According to Lepper, accession to the Monetary Union would be advisable only on the condition that Poland achieves a level of economic development similar to that of Western European countries; otherwise, depriving the National Bank of Poland of the ability to shape monetary policy poses a threat to the country's sovereignty in this fundamental area. In addition, it was argued that the price effects of the introduction of the euro would be unacceptable to Polish society. The party's experts argued that the countries that had not decided to join the euro area maintained a higher level of economic development while avoiding the price increases that the introduction of the common currency would have caused.

The party declared its support for the process of further enlargement of the European Union, in contrast to right-wing parties, allowing membership to be granted not only to Ukraine, but also to Turkey. The commencement of negotiations with the latter country was supported by the majority of Samoobrona MEPs, who voted in favour of the relevant resolution. Unlike some right-wing parties, Samoobrona did not make support for a country's EU membership dependent on its cultural face and civilisational affiliation, but only on the fulfilment of formal membership conditions. On the other hand, it declared that the country's admission to the EU should not be at the expense of the funds allocated to Poland, which led R. Czarnecki to conclude that rather unhurried negotiations were necessary.

The participation of Polish soldiers in the NATO operation in Afghanistan was consistently contested by Samoobrona. The main arguments cited were the cost of warfare and the risk of loss of life of Polish soldiers. Samoobrona was very consistently and strongly opposed to the Iraq War. It was the only Polish party which as late as at the turn of 2002 and 2003 (before the invasion began) stated its expression to war. After the invasion of Iraq and the overthrow of Hussein's government, Lepper suggested that the forces of the international coalition should be replaced by peacekeeping formations operating under the aegis of the United Nations. In a petition addressed to then President Aleksander Kwaśniewski, Samoobrona also drew attention to the contradictory nature of the operation in Iraq against international law. It was emphasised that a sovereign country, posing no threat, even potential, to Poland's security, had been attacked. The war in Iraq was described as "aggressive" and constituting a violation of international standards.

The party was also described as pro-Russian, anti-NATO and anti-EU. Describing the party, German political scientist Nikolaus Werz wrote that Samoobrona "rejects globalisation, criticises the free market economy and strikes a protectionist, socialist and nationalist tone. There are also pro-Russian tendencies and a noticeable nostalgia for the People's Republic of Poland. Lepper is an opponent of Poland's membership of NATO and the EU." Marijuš Antonovič wrote that League of Polish Families and Samoobrona were two Polish parties "which did not hide their pro‑Moscow foreign policy views"; Andrzej Lepper was awarded two honoris causa doctoral titles in Russia, and Samoobrona members were invited to Russia by the Russian government for common projects. In its program, Samoobrona also emphasized that it attached particular importance to Polish relations with Russia, and condemned emerging tensions between two countries as an attempt to cut off Poland from trade and make it fall into economic domination of the Western countries. The party's deputy, Bolesław Borysiuk, presented a plan of establishing "Joint Polish-Russian Commission for Trade and Economic Cooperation", which would foster cooperation with Russia at regional level and also establish a joint Polish-Russian bank that would finance trade.

Samoobrona promoted ties with Russia in culture and science; this sympathy was extended to Ukraine as well as Belarus, with Lepper stating that Poland should only enter the EU together with Ukraine, stressing the 'brotherhood' of both countries. In regards to Belarus, Samoobrona wanted to normalise Polish relations with the Belarusian president Lukashenko, and thus persistently distanced itself from any negative assessments of the Belarusian government, often condemning allegations of human and civil rights violations as either fake or exaggerated. In 2005, the party condemned "ethnic hatred" incited by the Union of Poles in Belarus and declared its support for Lukashenko. In 1999, Samoobrona also protested NATO attacks on Yugoslavia, stating that "NATO rejected the mask of a defence pact and became a gendarme, guarding the interests of international finance". In 2005, Russian philosopher Aleksandr Dugin referred to Samoobrona as "the only pro-Russian party in Poland". Similar conclusion was reached by the Czech political scientist Marek Čejka, who wrote that Samoobrona "was often considered the party in parliament most favourable to the idea of Polish-Russian cooperation." The party was also critical of Americanism and Atlanticism of the Polish government, and promoted friendly relations with China in addition to supporting Russia.

Commenting on the 2023 Israeli invasion of the Gaza Strip, Samoobrona called the Gaza Strip "a strip of shame for the US and for the world". In its 2024 program, the party praised Palestine and Kurdistan, calling them "great nations" that are "constantly fighting for land, territory and the international community is deaf to these efforts."

=== Religion ===
Samoobrona strongly emphasised its attachment to Roman Catholicism, particularly valuing the authority of Pope John Paul II; the leader of Samoobrona highlighted his visits to the Vatican, emphasising that he considered the Pope to be a morally unquestionable authority. In numerous party programme documents issued over the course of several years, there were frequent references to the achievements of John Paul II and attempts to interpret Polish socio-economic reality in terms of the pope's proposed ethical standards. In interpreting the Pope's teaching, Samoobrona particularly accentuated those that included criticism of capitalism. Samoobrona self-identified as Christian left, claiming to represent a broad group of both Catholic and secular left; Lepper stated: "A social economy, free education, culture, education and health care, decent living conditions for pensioners, blocking the negative effects of globalisation, caring for the environment - these are just selected examples of leftism in state policy."

The party was particularly attached to the declaration of Pope John Paul II from 1991, stating: "It is unacceptable to claim that, after the defeat of real socialism, capitalism remained the only model of economic organisation". Samoobrona often repeated and highlighted this quote. The party argued that the downfall of communist Poland was not caused by its socialist economy, but rather by state atheism and its hostility towards the Catholic Church and its social teaching. Samoobrona contrasted this with its own socialism, which it described as based on agrarianism, patriotism and the Catholic social teaching. The party believed that this kind of Polish socialism, based on nationalist and religious tradition, would be the best possible system for Poland. The party promoted an utopian vision of "Polish socialism" based on small family farms, rural co-operatives, an end to the exploitation of the countryside and nationalised industry, with peasants being considered the "healthiest element of society, both biologically and morally".

The party emphasized papal inspiration and religious values in its program. In the party's program there is a whole series of declarations and sometimes direct references to the concepts proclaimed by Catholic social teaching. In 1995, Lepper declared that "the indications in the Encyclicals of John Paul II, especially in the Encyclical Laborem Exercens, became an inspiration for us in the formulation of our professional and social programmes", lamenting the insufficient presentation of the achievements of Catholic social teaching in the mass media. The social teaching of the Church was to provide an alternative to capitalism and neoliberalism; in this case, reference was made not only to papal encyclicals, but also to the sermons of Cardinal Wyszyński, in which the postulate of Poland's embarking on its own path of social and economic development, resulting from its specific tradition, was found. The party's program from 2003 also stated: "The Self-Defence of the Republic of Poland is guided by the social teaching of the Church and fully shares the indications of the greatest moral authority of our times, Pope John Paul II, contained in his encyclicals".

The party used a lot of religious rhetoric in regards to economic issues, presenting anti-capitalist, anti-liberal, anti-"cosmopolitan" and anti-market ideas. The key foundation of economic ideology of Samoobrona was a combination of socialism with the principles of Catholic social teaching, rejecting capitalism as "fiscal repression and total commercialisation" while also strongly attacking a "reductionist" economic-theoretical approach, typical of the "Anglo-Germanic mentality" and based on the "Protestant dogma of predestination". As a counter-proposal, the party praised "econology", defined as the prioritisation of ecology in economic thinking. The post-1989 socioeconomic situation in Poland was described as "socio-economic satanism" or "economic genocide", and the party manifesto read: "All the tragedies that the Poles are experiencing ... are the consequence of the loss of their own sovereignty and the subordination of the country to foreign interests, as carried out by a group of venal politicians who, thanks to political fraud and by lying to the Polish people, have been able to make their own decisions. are the consequence of the loss of their own sovereignty and the subordination of the country to foreign interests, as carried out by a group of venal politicians who have brought themselves to power thanks to political fraud and by lying to the voters." However, Samoobrona is explicitly socialist and not only sympathises with the former People's Republic of Poland, but openly identifies with its communist form of society and socialist ideals.

Despite its attachment to Catholicism, the party also made statements critical of the church. Lepper deplored the attitude of a part of the Catholic hierarchy, for example by criticising the lack of interest of Primate Józef Glemp in a meeting with the party's delegation. During the transformation period, the Polish bishops were accused of lacking social sensitivity, and of being materialistic and building a financial empire; Lepper went as far as stating that "they value money more than God". Glemp was criticised by Samoobrona for his lack of concern for the fate of Polish farmers, above all in the context of the Primate's statements suggesting support for police interventions against participants of agricultural blockades. Additionally, Andrzej Lepper expressed some understanding for the demands appearing in the 1990s in the circles of secular left for excluding religious instruction from public schools.

Political scientists compared Samoobrona to socialist and far-left movements of Latin America. Paweł Przyłęcki argued that the party "had all the main elements of the populist and socialist policies pursued in Latin American countries, particularly Argentina". One of the elements typical for far-left Latin American political discourse that Samoobrona was seen as incorporating is liberation theology. While conceptually communism was considered incompatible with Catholicism as it disrupted sociocultural traditions that the Church relied on, the relationship of between Catholicism and communist policies was complex and widely differed depending on the attitude of the local regime towards religion. While liberation theology was much less influential in Poland than in Latin America, highly popular Polish Pope John Paul II espoused liberation theology that avoided Marxist language. Gerald J. Beyer wrote in The American Journal of Economics and Sociology that social teaching of John Paul II echoed central points of liberation theology; John Paul II wrote that the Church tradition is “in clear opposition to capitalism as a socioeconomic system as well as a general system of values” and affirmed that despite its flaws, communism correctly recognizes humans as social being while condemning liberalism for seeing humans as “isolated” being who enter into relationships only for “egocentric interests”. While rejecting its atheistic and materialistic characteristics, John Paul II stated that Marxism had a “kernel of truth” regarding the need for common possession of goods and rejection of capitalism as an inherently inhumane and exploitative system. Samoobrona represented a radicalized version of papal teaching, fully endorsing the social teaching of John Paul II on one hand, while praising the communist Polish People's Republic on the other.

On the other hand, the group supported the ratification of the concordat with the Holy See, accepting "the unique position of the Catholic Church vis-à-vis other confessions in Poland". Given the much higher level of religiosity in rural areas, Samoobrona's leaders often appeared at religious ceremonies without political risk and even gained some support, for example on the occasion of the Jasna Góra Harvest Festival. This did not prevent them from criticising those representatives of the Episcopate who were critical of the agricultural protests co-organised by Samoobrona. On the other hand, party politicians emphasised that they boasted the sympathy of a large proportion of parish priests in rural parishes. The party's electorate, according to available surveys, was heterogeneous on issues related to the desirable nature of state-church relations. While it was possible to discern among party sympathisers supporters of limiting the role of the Church as an institution in public life (e.g. those advocating the abolition of the Church Fund), anticlerical sentiments did not turn into attempts to negate the ethical message of the Roman Catholic Church.

=== Ecology ===
The party has been described as environmentalist. Besides Samoobrona's invocations of Catholic socialism and 'patriotic socialism', Lepper also made remarks towards green socialism. He stressed the environmentalist character of the party, explaining that he founded Samoobrona "because the spectre of economic and biological doom is staring us in the face". In a 1993 interview, he stated:

It is a personal dream of mine that we clean up this common Poland of ours, tidy up its roads, regulate its rivers, build reservoirs, remove dirt and rubbish dumps, broken fences, potholed pavements and derelict buildings - in short, take a serious and effective approach to the environment and ecology. Then we would all breathe easier. For these reasons, our Samoobrona movement is akin to the Greens, with whom we will gladly cooperate.

— Andrzej Lepper, Samoobrona - Dlaczego? Przed czym?, (Warsaw 1993), p. 42

Despite its agrarian character, Samoobrona also identified with the green movement, and environmentalists were an important part of Lepper's social and political circle; Samoobrona was founded not only by agrarian trade unions, but a minor Polish green party as well. Party's program promoted the concepts of "eco-development" and "econology", which were described as replacement of consumerism and materialism in favour of "a closer relationship with the natural environment, the preservation of small-scale family farms and a humane treatment of animals". Samoobrona stated that it desired to introduce new ways of thinking into Polish economics that would encompass ecology, social ethics and Catholic morality. Concrete environmentalist proposals included in the party's program were opposition to agroindustrial development and 'intensive farming methods'.

Rafał Soborski listed Samoobrona as an example of an anti-globalization environmentalist movement, using rhetoric aligned with green movements - Samoobrona attacked corporations for pursuing profit-driven policies that are harmful to both the environment and the well-being of the society. Both greens and Samoobrona considered international corporations responsible for global inequality and exploitation, imprisoning "the majority of people in impoverished enclaves [in order to] move production there". This anti-corporation rhetoric also had cultural and nationalist themes, as anti-globalization and ecological movements attacked the progressing "McDonaldization of society" that contradicted and threatened national and local identities. Samoobrona mixed environmentalist undertones with agrarian issues, accusing big companies of destroying Polish farming by flooding the Polish market with foreign, poor-quality products. The party campaigned for expelling foreign capital in Poland in order to protect native farms and local products.

In 1999, Samoobrona entered a coalition with the American-based Animal Welfare Institute against Smithfield Foods, American food company that wanted to enter the Polish market. Samoobrona organised a conference together with AWI in May 2000, promoting ecology and alternatives to industrial farming. At the same time, Samoobrona steadily incorporated more ecological and animal welfare themes into its program. Later in 2000, AWI-Samoobrona movement was endorsed by the president of Polish National Veterinary Chamber, Bartosz Winiecki, who recruited Polish veterinarians to the anti-Smithfield coalition. In the end, six thousands Polish doctors of veterinary medicine and twenty thousand veterinary technicians joined the coalition's protests.

Samoobrona's activities proved crucial to bringing about a corporate farming ban in Poland; according to Joe Bandy and Jackie Smith, "the coalition between AWI and Samoobrona represents one of the successful cases in the emerging global justice movement". For his environmental activism, Lepper was awarded the Albert Schweitzer Medal in 2000. The leader of Samoobrona stated his commitment to animal welfare, stressing that animals must be treated "with respect, dignity and sympathy" and condemning modern meat industry as "concentration camps for animals". Regarding animal rights, Lepper stated: "The motto that I have adopted and that is adopted by the rest of Samoobrona says that if a person is not capable of loving animals and nature they will never be capable of loving another human being." He stressed that farm animals have "the right to dignity" and "the right to live without suffering and without being isolated from their natural environment". He spoke of corporate farming: "[These farms are] concentration camps for hogs. We had concentration camps in Poland before. We will not allow them again."

The party connected its environmentalist and anti-globalization cause with other elements of its ideology. Samoobrona highlighted that industrial farming companies have no respect for Polish tradition and way of life, noting that such companies destroy the nests of white storks which are considered a national symbol of Poland. On behalf of Samoobrona, an AWI representative stated: "People never destroy them, they believe if you have a nest, lightning will never strike." Lepper also played on nostalgia towards communist Poland and his party's socialist appeal, stating that the industrial farms of foreign corporations are built off the privatization of state-owned farms, the State Agricultural Farms. These farms collapsed in the early 1990s, which led to very high unemployment in the Polish countryside. Samoobrona decried industrial farming and the corporations introducing it in Poland as "cancer", with Lepper stating that "the company ravages the environment, destroys jobs and traditional society". Once farming corporations shifted their tactic away from buying Polish land outright (which requires permission from the Polish government) to indirectly controlling farms through taking control of minor Polish companies through EU rules, Samoobrona adopted opposition to the European integration and the European Union as a part of its environmentalist cause.

In line with its alliance with the Animal Welfare Institute, Samoobrona opposes industrial farms of pigs, cattle and poultry; it denounces the practice as unethical and a cause of animal suffering, and also argues that agricultural companies cause significant pollution of the environment and lead to the collapse of small farmers. Lepper criticized the officials of other countries for neglecting environmental causes - in his 1999 Capitol speech, he stated: "I have read Vice President Gore's book on environmental protection, but I can see that he writes one thing and does another." Samoobrona tied its defence of animal rights and Polish small farmers to a larger struggle against international corporations, of which the party wanted trade unionists and environmentalists to also be a part of. Lepper stressed that he "the spokesman for the poor - no longer only the rural poor", and called for a new 'worker-peasant alliance' that would incorporate green politics.

Samoobrona was also supported by and collaborated with many minor environmentalist movements in Poland. It worked together with the Federation of the Greens (Polish: Federacja Zielonych), the eco-anarchist Federacja Anarchistyczna, as well as the eco-socialist Anticapitalist Offensive (Polish: Antykapitalistyczna Ofensywa). Common actions that these movements cooperated with Samoobrona with were anti-globalization as well as animal welfare protests. Polish ecologist journal The Green Brigades (Polish: Zielone Brygady) argued that the alliance of Samoobrona and environmentalists should be not seen as "exotic", as "it is the peasants and not the representatives of the McWorld on Poland from the only right parties who are our natural allies". In its statement endorsing the agrarian protests of Samoobrona, Federation of the Greens noted that the economic pressure applied on Polish farmers will exacerbate unemployment and housing shortages as the Polish countryside is already impoverished and lacks access to essential services such as sewerage, well-maintained roads, segregation systems, as well as education and healthcare. It urged environmentalists activists to solidarize with Polish farmers and not "divide trade unions into right and wrong", and to fight climate change and environmental destruction in alliance with the disadvantaged rather than for the "interests of the import lobby".

== Election results ==
=== Presidential ===
Election year	Candidate	1st round		2nd round	
Election year	Candidate	Votes	%	Votes	%
1995	Andrzej Lepper	235,797	1.3 (#9)	Endorsed Aleksander Kwaśniewski	
2000	Andrzej Lepper	537,570	3.1 (#5)	No second round	
2005	Andrzej Lepper	2,259,094	15.1 (#3)	Endorsed Lech Kaczyński	
2010	Andrzej Lepper	214,657	1.3 (#7)	Opposed Jarosław Kaczyński	
2015				Endorsed Andrzej Duda (Note: Self-Defence Rebirth functioning as the de facto successor party of Samoobrona endorsed Andrzej Duda, while Samoobrona itself attacked President Komorowski for "acting against the Polish national interest.")	
2020				Endorsed Andrzej Duda	
2025	Aldona Skirgiełło (Note: Samoobrona initially fielded its own candidate for the election, Aldona Skirgiełło, but Skirgiełło narrowly fell short of the 100,000 signatures needed for a presidential candidate to appear on the ballot. Afterwards, Samoobrona endorsed Karol Nawrocki for both the 1st and 2nd round. Contrary to Samoobrona, Skirgiełło endorsed Grzegorz Braun instead.)	Endorsed Karol Nawrocki			

=== Sejm ===
Election	Votes	%	Seats	+/–	Government
1991	3,247	0.1 (#72)	0 / 460	New	Extra-parliamentary
1991	As the Provincial Farmers' Self-Defence Committee.				
1993	383,967	2.8 (#12)	0 / 460	Steady	Extra-parliamentary
1997	10,073	0.1 (#14)	0 / 460	Steady	Extra-parliamentary
2001	1,327,624	10.2 (#3)	53 / 460	▲53	SLD-UP-PSL (2001-2003) (confidence and supply)
2001	1,327,624	10.2 (#3)	53 / 460	▲53	SLD-UP (2003-2004)
2001	1,327,624	10.2 (#3)	53 / 460	▲53	SLD-UP-SDPL (2004-2005)
2005	1,347,355	11.4 (#3)	56 / 460	▲3	PiS Minority (2005-2006)
2005	1,347,355	11.4 (#3)	56 / 460	▲3	PiS–SRP–LPR (2006-2007)
2005	1,347,355	11.4 (#3)	56 / 460	▲3	PiS Minority (2007)
2007	247,335	1.5 (#5)	0 / 460	▼56	Extra-parliamentary
2011 (Note: As Our Home Poland – Andrzej Lepper's Self-Defence)	9,733	0.1 (#11)	0 / 460	Steady	Extra-parliamentary
2015 (Note: As Self-Defence)	4,266	0.1 (#15)	0 / 460	Steady	Extra-parliamentary
2019	5,448	0.1 (#20)	0 / 460	Steady	Extra-parliamentary
2019	As part of the Action of Disappointed Retirees and Pensioners.				
2023	Endorsed the 2023 Polish referendum.				

=== Senate ===
Election	Seats	+/–
1993	0 / 100	New
1997	0 / 100	Steady
2001	2 / 100	▲2
2005	3 / 100	▲1
2007	0 / 100	▼3
2011	0 / 100	Steady
2015	0 / 100	Steady
2019	0 / 100	Steady
2023 (Note: As both Self-Defence and Self-Defence of the Republic of Poland, with two separate lists)	0 / 100	Steady

=== European Parliament ===
Election	Votes	%	Seats	+/–	EP Group
2004	656,782	10.78 (#4)	6 / 54	New	PES / UEN
2009	107,185	1.46 (#7)	0 / 50	▼6	–
2014	2,729	0.04 (#12)	0 / 51	0	–
2019	Endorsed Social Justice Movement				
2024	260	0.00 (#10)	0 / 53	0	–
2024	A party member ran on the lists of the Repair Poland Movement.				

=== Regional assemblies ===
Election	%	Seats	+/–
1994	1.3 (#10)	32 / 2,468	▲32
1998	15.1 (#3)	89 / 855	▲57
1998	As part of the Social Alliance.		
2002	16.0 (#2)	101 / 561	▲12
2006	5.6 (#5)	37 / 561	▼64
2010	1.1 (#9)	0 / 561	▼37
2014	0.3 (#17)	0 / 555	Steady
2018	0.1 (#18)	0 / 552	Steady
2024	0.9 (#8)	0 / 552	Steady

== Leadership ==
- Andrzej Lepper (1992–2011)
- Andrzej Prochoń (2012)
- Lech Kuropatwiński (2012–2022)
- Krzysztof Prokopczyk (2022–incumbent)

== Successors ==
Samoobrona had a profound influence on Polish politics and the party's populist rhetoric left a permanent mark on Polish political culture. Sociologist Remigiusz Okraska recalled: "Lepper was the sword that kept hovering over the heads of the complacent scoundrels of Warsaw and Krakow and reminded them - and all of us - that another world existed. A world of closed-down state-owned farms, small towns in decay, which are experiencing civilisational decline, closed-down factories, rural and urban poverty, hungry children and vegetating old people. It is largely thanks to him that today even the establishment media have stopped pretending that it is OK, that we are catching up and overtaking Europe, that there are no real, entrenched and growing social problems. Just 15 years ago, the same media only featured 'successful people' and the 'hard-working middle class' and a handful of 'choosing losers'." Similarly, historian Jarosław Tomasiewicz described Samoobrona as "plebeian left, organically growing out of the everyday problems of ordinary people" and a "genuinely popular movement, born of grassroots social struggles and not of ideological inspiration, a movement that did not need to 'stylise' itself and, like the mythological Antaeus of mother-earth, drew its power directly from the people." The surprising, dark-horse success of Samoobrona and its subsequent downfall continue to be a heavily researched and unique phenomenon in Polish politics, which gave birth to movements that would base themselves off Samoobrona and its rhetoric.

The party had also undergone a major change during its existence in terms of both public perception and ideology. The party started as a loose organization that engaged in a non-conventional and protest profile that brought together workers, the unemployed, pensioners and the poor; the party had both socialists and former communists along with military men and ultranationalists in its ranks. However, the party gradually eschewed its big-tent character in favour of a radically left-wing outlook, which led to Andrzej Lepper dismissing the nationalist wing of the party and calling for a "worker-peasant alliance" that envisioned Samoobrona cooperating together with other left-wing and post-communist parties. This made the party transition from a protest party to a consolidated, extreme-left party based on economic class rhetoric. Lepper would call for return to socialism during his 1999 presidential campaign, arguing that it had "not yet reached full maturity". Consequently, the international media came to see Lepper as "Polish Hugo Chávez", comparing and finding similarities with their socialist and populist rhetoric. By 2007, the party was considered to be on the extreme end of left-wing spectrum in Poland. This political and ideological transition, in addition to numerous scandals and conflicting decisions such as party's choice to cooperate with both left-wing (such as SLD and UP) and right-wing (PiS and LPR) parties resulted in multiple conflicts and splits within Samoobrona, with many dissident groups founding their own political parties. These include:

Parties based on Samoobrona
Name	Native name	Founded	Alignment	Comments
National Self-Defence Front	Front Narodowej Samoobrony	1994	Right-wing	Staunchly nationalist and right-wing movement founded by Janusz Bryczkowski, nationalist activist of Samoobrona expelled after his unsuccessful attempt to oust Andrzej Lepper from leadership. Dissolved in 1995.
Polish Peasant Bloc	Polski Blok Ludowy	2003	Centrist	Agrarian and centrist faction led by Wojciech Mojzesowicz who left Samoobrona over its perceived turn to the left. The party disbanded in 2004 and joined right-wing populist Law and Justice.
Self-Defence of the Polish Nation	Samoobrona Narodu Polskiego	2003	Right-wing	First long-lived Samoobrona split. Right-wing nationalist wing of the party that declared itself autonomous of the party in 2003 to protest Samoobrona's confidence and supply agreement with social democratic SLD and UP. Registered as a separate party in 2006 and ran an anti-capitalist campaign, but was struck off the ballot for trying to impersonate Samoobrona. Changed its name to "Defence of the Polish Nation" and ran in elections until 2019, and dissolved itself in 2023.
Polish Reason of State	Polska Racja Stanu	2003	Left-wing	Small parliamentary club turned a political party with diverse members. It dissolved in 2005 and most of its members went on to participate in Self-Defence Social Movement.
Initiative of the Republic of Poland	Inicjatywa Rzeczypospolitej Polskiej	2004	Left-wing	Socialist split composed of two Łódź MPs. The party believed that "Samoobrona has a good programme, but it is not being implemented". It participated in the 2005 Polish parliamentary election gaining 0.1% of the vote, and was deregistered in 2010.
Self-Defence Social Movement	Samoobrona Ruch Społeczny	2006	Left-wing	Local agrarian socialist faction within Samoobrona that focused on rural interests, and left the party over a conflict with the regional branch's leader Krzysztof Filipek. Dissolved in 2007 to join Self-Defence Rebirth.
People's National Movement	Ruch Ludowo-Narodowy	2006	Centrist	Parliamentary club of MPs from Samoobrona and League of Polish Families (LPR) that protested the downfall of the PiS-Samoobrona-LPR coalition. It promptly dissolved to join Law and Justice after 3 months of existence. It took its the name from the concept that Samoobrona pursued between 1999 and 2004, "The People's National Bloc" (Polish: Blok Ludowo-Narodowy), that envisioned an anti-neoliberal, economically left-wing coalition between Samoobrona, League of Polish Families, Polish People's Party and Polish Labour Party - August 80.
Patriotic Self-Defence	Samoobrona Patriotyczna	2006	Right-wing	Nationalist party that accused Samoobrona of abandoning its nationalist rhetoric in favour of far-left slogans. It adopted a logo and program very similar to Samoobrona in order to divert its voters in the 2007 election, but it was struck off the ballot in most district and won 0.02% of the vote in total. It disbanded in 2013.
Self-Defence Rebirth	Samoobrona Odrodzenie	2007	Left-wing	With its origins in a Catholic socialist wing of Samoobrona, Self-Defence Rebirth was founded in response to numerous scandals and electoral decline that rocked Samoobrona in 2007, and sought to unite all dissident Samoobrona parties under its banner. Following Andrzej Lepper's suicide in 2011, the party tried to rebuild the movement and described itself as "leftist but deeply religious". After finding itself unable to rekindle the political movement of Samoobrona, it committed itself to rural trade unions and farmers' interests.
Party of Regions	Partia Regionów	2007	Left-wing	Regionalist party highly critical of the centralized nature of Samoobrona. It was highly decentralized and had complex democratic party structures; the party was divided into regional branches highly autonomous of each other, with term-limited authorities elected by secret ballot. It called for decentralization and regionalization of Poland, stressing the importance of promoting and maintaining regional culture and patriotism rather than an 'all-Polish' one. The party had a principled leftist and socialist stance and ran on the party lists of Left Together. It was dissolved in 2017.
Radical Party of Oleh Liashko	Radykalna Partiia Oleha Liashka	2010	Left-wing	Ukrainian party known for its radical populism, combined with fiercely nationalist rhetoric and left-wing positions, especially on economics. While the party itself never referred to Polish Samoobrona nor its legacy, political observers nevertheless note that two parties are very similar, not only through their unique combination of radicalism, agrarianism, nationalism and left-wing populism, but also through political behavior - just like Samoobrona, the Radical Party of Oleh Liashko organizes protests that feature pitchforks as well as destruction of grain, together with radical demands.
Change	Zmiana	2015	Left-wing	A left-wing and anti-capitalist party founded by Mateusz Piskorski, who was a former spokesman of Samoobrona and later became the vice-president of the party. The party is not registered because the Polish court refused to register the party. Zmiana refers to ideas and values very similar to those of Samoobrona, such as socialist patriotism, and it is also considered left-wing, populist and anti-capitalist. The party is controversial for its pro-Russian and pro-Belarusian stances, and is accused of being funded by Russian intelligence. Polish media noted the ideological and cultural similarity of Zmiana to Samoobrona, and dubbed the party "a better Samoobrona on Kremlim money".
Social Movement of the Republic of Poland	Ruch Społeczny Rzeczypospolitej Polskiej	2015	Left-wing	A grassroots political party formed by the agricultural trade union OPZZ RiOR and led by Sławomir Izdebski, a former Samoobrona member, and Piotr Ikonowicz, a socialist activist who ran on the Samoobrona electoral lists in the 2007 parliamentary election. The party aimed to become a direct successor to Samoobrona. The party's goal was to "fight for the rights of various social groups harmed by neoliberal capitalism". It represented trade unionists, especially miners and farmers, as well as disability rights activists, unemployed, low-income workers and evicted tenants, and its electoral lists were exclusively composed of such groups. However, the party was stillborn by the fact that it only managed to register electoral lists in three districts.
Peasants' Party	Partia Chłopska	2018	Left-wing	Peasant movement party founded by former Samoobrona MPs such as Krzysztof Filipek during the 2018 drought that aspires to be a spiritual successor of Samoobrona. Strictly committed to rural interests, it has an agrarian socialist program very similar to that of Samoobrona. It ran on the party list of social democratic Democratic Left Alliance. Committed itself to rural cooperatives after its failure in the 2019 Polish parliamentary election.
AGROunion	AGROunia	2018	Left-wing	Founded by former member of Law and Justice Michał Kołodziejczak, who gained the reputation of 'second Lepper' by visiting his grave, paying tribute to him and promising to uphold Lepper's legacy in his speeches. AGROunia invited several left-wing and feminist activists to its convention, and runs on an agrarian socialist platform. It planned to form electoral alliance with Samoobrona in early August 2023, but it eventually chose to join the Civic Coalition instead. Kołodziejczak won a seat in the 2023 Polish parliamentary election and became the Vice-Minister of Agriculture in the new government.
Self-Defence Rebirth of Andrzej Lepper	Samoobrona Odrodzenie Andrzeja Leppera	2025	Left-wing	Founded in Lublin in January 2025 by the members of the pro-Russian Polish Anti-War Movement (Polish: Polski Ruch Antywojenny) Jerzy Andrzejewski and Piotr Panasiuk, as well as Marian Sołyga, former Samoobrona activist. Its founders praised Samoobrona as the only party "that, contrary to the narrative of the post-Solidarity parties, has been vocal about the fact that things are not so rosy in Poland." It is considered a part of a revival of public interest in Andrzej Lepper that started around 2022, with Lepper and his legacy becoming referenced and evoked by mainstream parties as well. The party adopted the same program and goals as Samoobrona, appealing to those unsatisfied with their socioeconomic situation.

=== Selbstverteidigung ===
Self-Defence Selbstverteidigung (German)
- Abbreviation: SV
- Leader: Heinz Klimczak
- Founded: 23 August 2002
- Headquarters: Berlin
- Membership (2002): 2,000
- Ideology: Socialist populism Anti-capitalism
- Political position: Left-wing to far-left
- Sister party: Self-Defence of the Republic of Poland
- Colors: Yellow; Sapphire
- Slogan: Man, family, decent living and work (Polish: Człowiek, rodzina, godne życie i praca)

On 23 August 2002, a sister party of Samoobrona known as Self-Defence (German: Selbstverteidigung, SV) was founded in Berlin, Germany. It was created by the German businessman of Polish ancestry Heinz Klimczak, who invited Andrzej Lepper to participate in the founding congress of his party and stated that it would be explicitly modelled on the Polish Samoobrona. Lepper attended the founding congress and expressed his delight at how much his views and party had been appreciated and used by Selbstverteidigung. Lepper also stated he had already received similar applications from other Central European countries, and announced his plans to form a "Samoobrona Internationale", which would unite socialist populist countries across Europe.

Selbstverteidigung adopted the exact same status and program as Samoobrona, and was mainly composed of impoverished East German entrepreneurs, farmers and intellectuals. Klimczak stated that the party serves the "people left to their own devices, cheated by the state", and explained that the main reasons for the formation of the party in Germany is the very bad situation of the inhabitants of the eastern German states, especially the unemployed. Klimczak himself was a struggling construction entrepreneur and condemned the effects that the capitalist transformation of East German economy had on the poorer parts of the society. Selbstverteidigung decried the economic consequences of the German reunification and argued that it had caused massive layoffs, collapse of Eastern industries, extreme income inequality as well as poverty and hunger. The founding of the party and Lepper's participation were initially ignored by local Berlin media. However, the party soon organized public protests and hunger strikes in front of the Brandenburg Gate in Berlin.

Lepper stressed the anti-capitalist character of the party, and stated that the founders of the party had been in contact with Samoobrona for a long time. He praised the diverse nature of Selbstverteidigung, composed of struggling entrepreneurs but also farmers and intellectuals. The party noted the growing disproportion between the East Germany and the dominant Western states, and noted the inequal treatment not only on an economic level, but also cultural discrimination which instils the feeling of cultural inferiority amongst East Germans. Lepper also noted that the situation of East Germany is similar to the one of Poland which makes the program of Samoobrona applicable - much like Poland, East Germany had also gone through a transformation from a socialist system to a capitalist market economy, with the subsequent economic growth benefitting the very few while leaving behind millions of financially struggling and unemployed people. The main postulate of the party was to be protection of trade unions and protesting the capitalist transformation of East German states.

Selbstverteidiung used a left-wing and populist-socialist rhetoric that mimicked the one of Samoobrona, demanding a new economic system in Germany that would create conditions for "ordinary people to live with dignity", and decrying the capitalist order as one that divided society into "very poor and very rich". The party also stated that it seeks to protect the poorest, as well as the farmers and the middle class, from large corporations. It also proposed an establishment of an economic "third way", which would restore the positive aspects of the socialist East German system that now impoverished groups depended on, while avoiding the negative excesses. Selbstverteidiung accentuated that the economy should be based on the principle of prioritizing "the human being, the family, a decent life and work".

In its statement on Selbstverteidigung party, Samoobrona stated that it will support its sister party while also respecting its autonomy and the unique East German conditions, which are nevertheless similar to the Polish situation. Selbstverteidigung was planning to gather at least 10,000 members within 3 months, and contest the 2002 German federal election. However, criminal proceedings were initiated against the party's leader, Heinz Klimczak. After Klimczak was accused of economic fraud, Samoobrona decided to keep its communication with its German sister party private, which made the topic disappear from the headlines. The fate of the Selbstverteidigung is unknown. Klimczak was released in December 2002 and stated that the fraud charges were connected to a business partner that Selbstverteidigung wanted to cooperate with. In 2004, Klimczak founded a company in Oberschöneweide that sells traditional Polish delicacies. Andrzej Lepper also developed ties in the Czech Republic, where an attempt to develop a Czech sister party of Samoobrona was made.

== See also ==
- AGROunia
- League and Self-Defense
- Party of Regions
- Patriotic Self-Defence
- Peasants' Party
- Self-Defence Rebirth
- Self-Defence Social Movement
- Self-Defence of the Polish Nation
