= List of League of Polish Families politicians =

A list of notable Polish politicians of the right-wing League of Polish Families party (Polish: Liga Polskich Rodzin).

== A ==
- Filip Adwent
- Przemysław Andrejuk

== B ==
- Witold Bałażak
- Ryszard Bender
- Krzysztof Bosak

== C ==
- Sylwester Chruszcz
- Edward Ciągło

== D ==
- Marian Daszyk
- Janusz Dobrosz

== F ==
- Piotr Farfał
- Andrzej Fedorowicz

== G ==
- Maciej Giertych
- Roman Giertych
- Dariusz Grabowski

== H ==
- Witold Hatka

== J ==
- Gabriel Janowski
- Jan Jarota

== K ==
- Marek Kawa
- Marek Kotlinowski
- Bogusław Kowalski
- Janusz Kołodziej
- Urszula Krupa
- Jacek Kurski

== L ==
- Henryk Lewczuk

== M ==
- Antoni Macierewicz
- Arnold Masin
- Gabriela Masłowska
- Andrzej Mańka
- Halina Murias
- Leszek Murzyn

== O ==
- Mirosław Orzechowski
- Edward Ośko

== P ==
- Radosław Parda
- Daniel Pawłowiec
- Mirosław Piotrowski
- Bogdan Pęk

== R ==
- Elżbieta Ratajczak
- Bogusław Rogalski

== S ==
- Bogusław Sobczak
- Anna Sobecka
- Antoni Sosnowski
- Ewa Sowińska
- Robert Strąk

== T ==
- Witold Tomczak

== W ==
- Rafał Wiechecki
- Wojciech Wierzejski
- Robert Winnicki
- Zygmunt Wrzodak

== Z ==
- Stanisław Zadora

== Ś ==
- Piotr Ślusarczyk
