= Łuczak =

Łuczak is a Polish surname. Notable people with the surname include:

- Andrzej Łuczak (born 1948), Polish chess master and scientist
- Czesław Łuczak (1922–2002), Polish historian
- Jan-Marco Luczak (born 1975), German lawyer and politician
- Jerzy Luczak-Szewczyk (1923–1975), Polish-Swedish artist
- Krystian Łuczak (born 1949), Polish politician
- Krzysztof Łuczak (born 1975), Polish long jumper
- Malwina Łuczak, Polish-Australian mathematician
- Magdalena Łuczak (1986 - 2015), convicted murderer and mother of Daniel Pełka
- Mieczysław Marcin Łuczak (born 1955), Polish politician
- Olivia Luczak (born 1981), Polish-German boxer
- Peter Luczak (born 1979), Polish-Australian tennis player
- Tomasz Łuczak (born 1963), Polish mathematician
- Wojciech Łuczak (born 1989), Polish footballer
