= List of Sejm members (2005–2007) =

5th term of the Sejm

5th Sejm
←	4th Sejm	6th Sejm	→
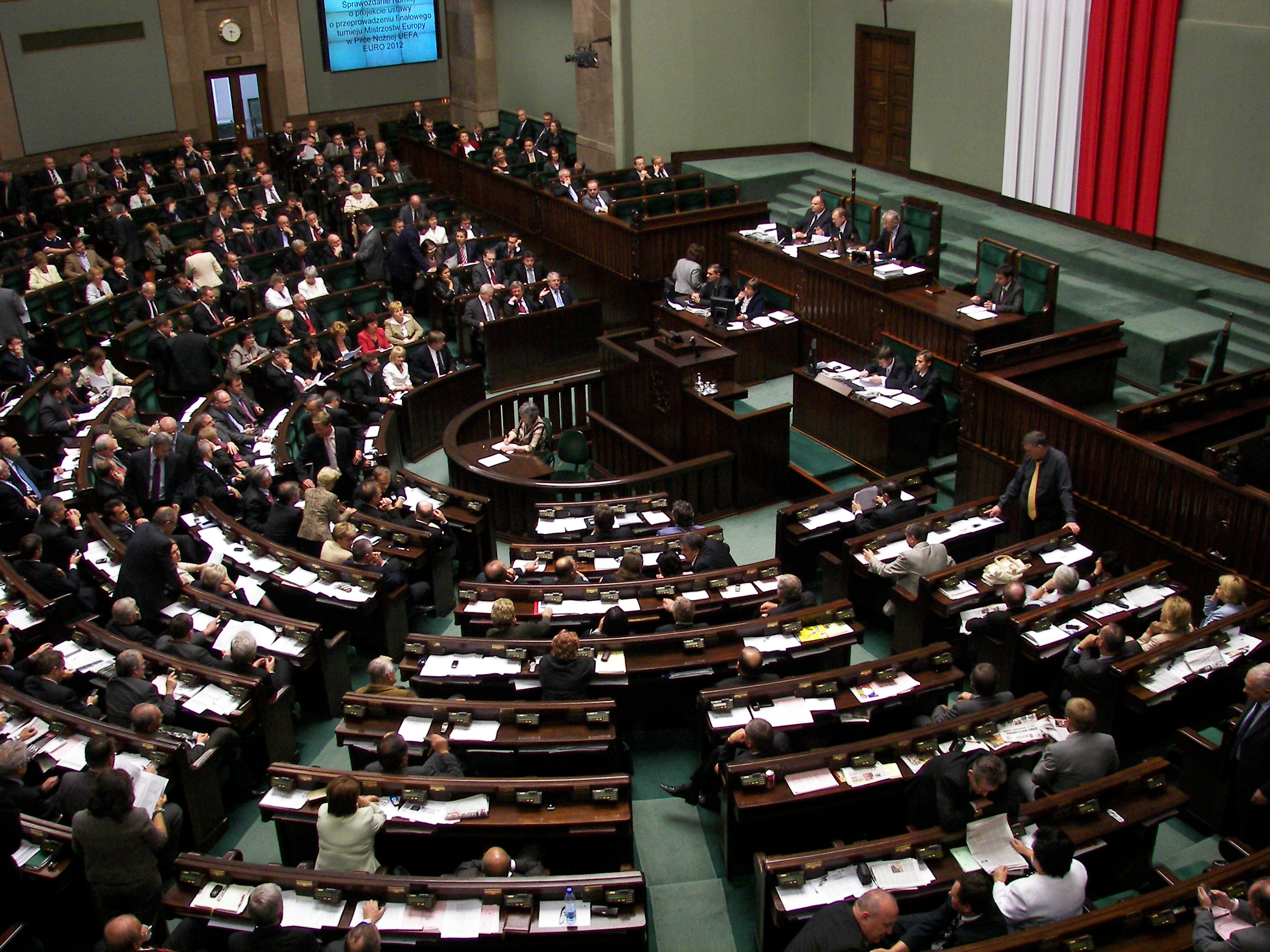

Overview
- Legislative body: Sejm
- Term: 19 October 2005 – 4 November 2007
- Election: 2005
- Government: Marcinkiewicz (2005–2006); Kaczyński (2006–2007)
- Members: 460
- Senior Marshal: Józef Zych
- Sejm Marshal: Marek Jurek (2005–2007); Ludwik Dorn (2007)
- Deputy Sejm Marshals: Jarosław Kalinowski; Bronisław Komorowski; Marek Kotlinowski (2005–2006); Andrzej Lepper (2005–2006); Wojciech Olejniczak; Genowefa Wiśniowska (2006–2007); Janusz Dobrosz (2006–2007)

The fifth Sejm, the lower house of the Parliament of Poland, was elected on 25 September 2005 at the 2005 Polish parliamentary election. The term lasted between 19 October 2005 and 4 November 2007, two years before mandatory end of its four year term, as the chamber decided to dissolve itself on 7 September 2007.

The marshal of the Sejm was elected on the second day of the first session, that is on 26 October 2006. Thus Senior Marshal Józef Zych served for seven days.

== Presidium ==
Office	Holder	Terms of office	
Senior Marshal	Józef Zych	19 October 2005	26 October 2005
Marshal	Marek Jurek (Note: Marek Jurek served as the Sejm Marshal while being Law and Justice politician. After he resigned from the office he left the party and established his own parliamentary group and party called Right Wing of the Republic.)	26 October 2005	27 April 2007 (Resigned)
Marshal	Ludwik Dorn	27 April 2007	4 November 2007
Deputy Marshals	Jarosław Kalinowski	26 October 2005	4 November 2007
Deputy Marshals	Bronisław Komorowski	26 October 2005	4 November 2007
Deputy Marshals	Marek Kotlinowski	26 October 2005	27 October 2006
Deputy Marshals	Andrzej Lepper	26 October 2005	9 May 2006 (Resigned)
Deputy Marshals	Wojciech Olejniczak	26 October 2005	4 November 2007
Deputy Marshals	Genowefa Wiśniowska	9 May 2006	7 September 2007
Deputy Marshals	Janusz Dobrosz	16 November 2006	4 November 2007

== Composition ==
On 4 November 2007, at the end of the term, deputies were affiliated with the following parliamentary clubs (klub) and caucuses (koło):

Parliamentary group	Deputies
Law and Justice (PiS); Klub Parlamentarny Prawo i Sprawiedliwość	151
Civic Platform (PO); Klub Parlamentarny Platforma Obywatelska	131
Democratic Left Alliance (SLD); Klub Parlamentarny Sojuszu Lewicy Demokratycznej	55
Self-Defence of the Republic of Poland (Samoobrona); Klub Parlamentarny Samoobrona Rzeczypospolitej Polskiej	41
League of Polish Families (LPR); Klub Parlamentarny Liga Polskich Rodzin	29
Polish People's Party (PSL); Klub Parlamentarny Polskiego Stronnictwa Ludowego	27
National People's Movement (RLN); Koło Poselskie Ruch Ludowo-Narodowy	7
Right Wing of the Republic (Prawica); Koło Poselskie Prawica Rzeczypospolitej	6
Non-inscrits	13
Total	460
Vacant	0

== Members of Sejm ==
Prawo i Sprawiedliwość
Andrzej Adamczyk; Waldemar Andzel; Marek Ast; Iwona Arent; Marzena Wróbel; Krzysztof Czarnecki; Witold Czarnecki; Arkadiusz Czartoryski; Ludwik Dorn; Zbigniew Girzyński; Bogusław Bosak; Edward Czesak; Andrzej Mikołaj Dera; Joachim Brudziński; Józef Cepil; Beata Kempa; Małgorzata Gosiewska; Tomasz Latos; Marek Kuchciński; Dariusz Olszewski; Michał Jach; Paweł Poncyljusz; Krzysztof Michałkiewicz; Leszek Dobrzyński; Grzegorz Janik; Tadeusz Plawgo; Jacek Bogucki; Marek Surmacz; Tadeusz Madziarczyk; Andrzej Ćwierz; Halina Olendzka; Robert Pantera; Ryszard Wawryniewicz; Jędrzej Jędrych; Krzysztof Mikuła; Maria Nowak; Krzysztof Maciejewski	Jarosław Kaczyński; Zbigniew Dolata; Dawid Jackiewicz; Zbigniew Ziobro; Przemysław Gosiewski; Marzena Machałek; Kazimierz Gwiazdowski; Michał Wójcik; Jarosław Zieliński; Krzysztof Jurgiel; Elżbieta Witek; Adam Hofman; Czesław Hoc; Szymon Giżyński; Robert Kołakowski; Jacek Kurski; Marek Ast; Leonard Krasulski; Kazimierz Michał Ujazdowski; Jarosław Sellin; Giovanni Roman; Bolesław Piecha; Andrzej Szlachta; Andrzej Walkowiak; Jarosław Jagiełło; Anna Paluch; Witold Śmiałek; Jerzy Bielecki; Anna Pakuła-Sacharczuk; Aleksander Chłopek; Michał Wojtkiewicz; Waldemar Wiązowski; Dariusz Seliga; Lucjan Karasiewicz; Marek Matuszewski; Kazimierz Moskal; Jerzy Materna	Artur Górski; Jerzy Gosiewski; Tomasz Górski; Wojciech Jasiński; Mieczysław Golba; Karol Karski; Sławomir Kłosowski; Izabela Kloc; Lech Kołakowski; Maks Kraczkowski; Henryk Kowalczyk; Łukasz Zbonikowski; Paweł Zalewski; Jadwiga Wiśniewska; Jan Szyszko; Daniela Chrapkiewicz; Edward Siarka; Grzegorz Tobiszowski; Jerzy Polaczek; Tadeusz Woźniak; Aleksandra Natalli-Świat; Marek Polak; Małgorzata Sadurska; Stanisław Szwed; Jarosław Żaczek; Mieczysław Walkiewicz; Andrzej Liss; Teresa Ceglecka-Zielonka; Stanisław Zając; Jacek Falfus; Tomasz Dudziński; Małgorzata Stryjska; Izabela Katarzyna Mrzygłocka; Kazimierz Gołojuch; Tomasz Markowski; Marian Goliński; Barbara Marianowska	Adam Lipiński; Krzysztof Lipiec; Beata Mazurek; Stanisław Pięta; Arkadiusz Mularczyk; Stanisław Ożóg; Jacek Tomczak; Jan Filip Libicki; Paweł Kowal; Alojzy Lysko; Marek Opioła; Adam Rogacki; Zbigniew Wassermann; Beata Szydło; Jolanta Szczypińska; Bartłomiej Szrajber; Jan Ołdakowski; Krzysztof Tchórzewski; Jarosław Stawiarski; Wiesław Kilian; Wojciech Mojzesowicz; Wojciech Szarama; Marek Suski; Ewa Malik; Jarosław Rusiecki; Piotr Krzywicki; Sławomir Zawiślak; Maria Zuba; Tadeusz Wita; Zbigniew Chmielowiec; Karolina Gajewska; Monika Ryniak; Stanisława Anna Okularczyk; Kazimierz Matuszny; Mirosława Masłowska; Jacek Kościelniak; Marek Łatas
Civic Platform
Urszula Augustyn; Marek Biernacki; Paweł Arndt; Jerzy Fedorowicz; Joanna Fabisiak; Rafał Grupiński; Andrzej Gut-Mostowy; Łukasz Abgarowicz; Paweł Graś; Cezary Grabarczyk; Andrzej Biernat; Grzegorz Schetyna; Stanisław Gawłowski; Stanisław Huskowski; Elżbieta Łukacijewska; Arkadiusz Litwiński; Dariusz Lipiński; Anna Zielińska-Głębocka; Andrzej Czerwiński; Jacek Krupa; Bogdan Bojko; Jan Wyrowiński; Arkady Radosław Fiedler; Andrzej Smirnow; Kazimierz Plocke; Tomasz Głogowski; Tadeusz Jarmuziewicz; Damian Raczkowski; Tomasz Szczypiński; Zbigniew Pacelt; Jerzy Kozdroń; Domicela Kopaczewska; Stanisław Gorczyca	Małgorzata Kidawa-Błońska; Bogdan Zdrojewski; Bronisław Komorowski; Ewa Kopacz; Wojciech Ziemniak; Stanisław Żmijan; Grzegorz Dolniak; Magdalena Kochan; Sławomir Nowak; Jan Rokita; Donald Tusk; Andrzej Czuma; Zbigniew Chlebowski; Ireneusz Raś; Jarosław Duda; Beata Małecka-Libera; Tomasz Kulesza; Aldona Młyńczak; Bożenna Bukiewicz; Jadwiga Zakrzewska; Beata Bublewicz; Waldemar Szadny; Krzysztof Gadowski; Henryk Siedlaczek; Michał Stuligrosz; Andrzej Gałażewski; Ewa Wolak; Jan Walenty Tomaka; Elżbieta Pierzchała; Konstanty Miodowicz; Mirosław Koźlakiewicz; Leszek Korzeniowski; Krzysztof Lisek	Józef Berger; Tomasz Lenz; Tadeusz Kopeć; Adam Szejnfeld; Sławomir Nitras; Jarosław Wałęsa; Robert Tyszkiewicz; Jarosław Urbaniak; Tomasz Tomczykiewicz; Andrzej Halicki; Kazimierz Kleina; Wojciech Saługa; Lidia Staroń; Jolanta Hibner; Julia Pitera; Sławomir Jan Piechota; Jakub Szulc; Marek Wójcik; Tadeusz Aziewicz; Piotr Cybulski; Jerzy Budnik; Józef Piotr Klim; Eugeniusz Wycisło; Jan Rzymełka; Alicja Olechowska; Joanna Skrzydlewska; Halina Rozpondek; Zbigniew Rynasiewicz; Danuta Pietraszewska; Rafał Muchacki; Sebastian Karpiniuk; Zbigniew Kozak; Andrzej Markowiak	Czesław Mroczek; Paweł Olszewski; Janusz Palikot; Włodzimierz Karpiński; Teresa Piotrowska; Arkadiusz Rybicki; Elżbieta Radziszewska; Sławomir Rybicki; Jakub Rutnicki; Paweł Śpiewak; Wojciech Wilk; Krystyna Szumilas; Robert Ambroziewicz; Iwona Śledzińska-Katarasińska; Aleksander Grad; Mirosław Drzewiecki; Krystyna Skowrońska; Stanisław Lamczyk; Krzysztof Zaremba; Waldy Dzikowski; Stanisław Chmielewski; Janusz Chwierut; Ewa Więckowska; Maria Pasło-Wiśniewska; Wojciech Picheta; Danuta Jazłowiecka; Maciej Świątkowski; Beata Dorota Sawicka; Roman Kosecki; Tomasz Piotr Nowak; Ryszard Knosala; Krzysztof Grzegorek
Self-Defence of the Republic of Poland
Renata Beger; Mieczysław Aszkiełowicz; Krzysztof Filipek; Andrzej Lepper; Lech Kuropatwiński; Jerzy Żyszkiewicz; Czesław Litwin; Genowefa Wiśniowska; Rajmund Moric; Grzegorz Skwierczyński; Danuta Hojarska	Janusz Maksymiuk; Stanisław Łyżwiński; Adam Ołdakowski; Jan Łączny; Sandra Lewandowska; Wanda Łyżwińska; Zenon Wiśniewski; Elżbieta Wiśniowska; Grzegorz Kołacz; Andrzej Ruciński; Renata Rochnowska	Jerzy Zawisza; Maria Zbyrowska; Grażyna Tyszko; Marzena Paduch; Mateusz Piskorski; Hubert Costa; Alina Gut; Bolesław Borysiuk; Waldemar Starosta; Wojciech Romaniuk; Henryk Młynarczyk	Marek Wojtera; Lech Woszczerowicz; Krzysztof Ryszard Sikora; Janusz Wójcik; Małgorzata Olejnik; Edward Józef Kiedos; Lech Szymańczyk; Andrzej Grzesik; Regina Wasilewska-Kita; Zofia Grabczan; Halina Molka
Democratic Left Alliance
Izabela Jaruga-Nowacka; Krystyna Łybacka; Janusz Zemke; Piotr Gadzinowski; Ryszard Kalisz; Joanna Senyszyn; Jerzy Wenderlich; Wojciech Olejniczak; Tadeusz Motowidło; Tomasz Garbowski; Grzegorz Kurczuk; Jolanta Szymanek-Deresz; Stanisław Piosik; Henryk Milcarz	Grzegorz Napieralski; Jerzy Szmajdziński; Katarzyna Piekarska; Władysław Stępień; Tadeusz Iwiński; Włodzimierz Stępień; Sylwester Pawłowski; Jacek Piechota; Wacław Martyniuk; Anita Błochowiak; Stanisław Stec; Marek Wikiński; Wojciech Pomajda; Krystian Łuczak	Jan Szwarc; Grzegorz Woźny; Artur Ostrowski; Wiesław Szczepański; Małgorzata Ostrowska; Ewa Janik; Janusz Krasoń; Jan Kochanowski; Witold Gintowt-Dziewałtowski; Henryk Gołębiewski; Bogusław Wontor; Stanisław Rydzoń; Wiesław Jędrusik; Elżbieta Jankowska	Ryszard Zbrzyzny; Stanisław Wziątek; Zbyszek Zaborowski; Kazimierz Chrzanowski; Marek Strzaliński; Tadeusz Tomaszewski; Michał Tober; Grażyna Ciemniak; Eugeniusz Czykwin; Witold Klepacz; Szczepan Skomra; Stanisława Prządka; Sławomir Jeneralski
League of Polish Families
Krzysztof Bosak; Przemysław Andrejuk; Witold Bałażak; Witold Hatka; Janusz Dobrosz; Roman Giertych; Marek Kawa; Rafał Wiechecki; Stanisław Papież	Robert Strąk; Szymon Pawłowski; Mirosław Orzechowski; Antoni Sosnowski; Stanisław Zadora; Bogusław Sobczak; Elżbieta Ratajczak; Piotr Ślusarczyk; Jan Jarota	Andrzej Fedorowicz; Edward Ciągło; Wojciech Wierzejski; Andrzej Mańka; Edward Ośko; Janusz Kołodziej; Halina Murias; Radosław Parda; Daniel Pawłowiec	Arnold Masin; Leszek Murzyn
Polish People's Party
Jan Bury; Marek Sawicki; Józef Zych; Andrzej Grzyb; Jarosław Kalinowski; Waldemar Pawlak; Stanisław Żelichowski; Stanisław Kalemba; Mieczysław Kasprzak	Jan Łopata; Mirosław Maliszewski; Krystyna Ozga; Franciszek Stefaniuk; Wiesław Woda; Mirosław Krajewski; Andrzej Kłopotek; Edmund Borawski; Waldemar Nowakowski	Zbigniew Włodkowski; Bronisław Dutka; Eugeniusz Grzeszczak; Henryk Smolarz; Tadeusz Sławecki; Mirosław Pawlak; Aleksander Sopliński; Mieczysław Marcin Łuczak; Andrzej Pałys	
The National League
Krzysztof Szyga; Anna Sobecka; Gabriela Masłowska	Tadeusz Dębicki; Bogusław Kowalski; Józef Pilarz	Leszek Sułek	
Right Wing of the Republic
Małgorzata Bartyzel; Artur Zawisza	Dariusz Antoni Kłeczek; Marek Jurek	Marian Piłka	Lucyna Wiśniewska
Independent
Jan Bestry; Czesław Fiedorowicz; Ryszard Galla; Ryszard Kaczyński	Henryk Kroll; Antoni Mężydło; Alfred Budner; Józef Stępkowski	Zygmunt Wrzodak; Piotr Misztal; Bernard Ptak; Jan Bednarek	Marian Daszyk

=== mandates expired during the term of office ===
member	expiry date	resignation	next
Hanna Foltyn-Kubicka	6 December 2005	taking over the released mandate of a Member of the European Parliament	Daniela Chrapkiewicz
Elżbieta Kruk	31 January 2006	appointment as a member of the National Broadcasting Council	Jarosław Stawiarski
Ewa Sowińska	30 March 2006	appointment of the Ombudsman for Children	Mirosław Orzechowski
Mariusz Kamiński	5 July 2006	waiver of the mandate	Bartłomiej Szrajber
Kazimierz Marcinkiewicz	19 July 2006	waiver of the mandate	Marek Ast
Aleksander Szczygło	2 August 2006	appointment to the position of the head of the Chancellery of the President of the Republic of Poland	Iwona Arent
Andrzej Sośnierz	8 September 2006	appointment of the President of the National Health Fund	Józef Berger
Marek Kotlinowski	27 October 2006	election as a judge of the Constitutional Tribunal	Stanisław Papież
Józef Rojek	12 November 2006	election for the councilor of the City Council in Tarnów	Robert Pantera
Adam Puza	12 November 2006	election of a councilor of the Sejmik of the Warmian-Masurian Voivodeship	Tadeusz Plawgo
Zbigniew Sosnowski	12 November 2006	elections for the district councilor in Brodnica	Andrzej Kłopotek
Jan Zubowski	26 November 2006	election for the President of the City of Głogów	Marzena Machałek
Hanna Gronkiewicz-Waltz	26 November 2006	election as the President of the Capital City of Warsaw	Andrzej Czuma
Edward Maniura	26 November 2006	election of the Mayor of the City of Lubliniec	Wojciech Picheta
Zbigniew Podraza	26 November 2006	election of the President of the City of Dąbrowa Górnicza	Witold Klepacz
Roman Czepe	26 November 2006	election of the mayor of the Łapy commune	Kazimierz Gwiazdowski
Jacek Wojciechowicz	5 December 2006	appointment of the vice-president of the capital city Of Warsaw	Andrzej Halicki
Barbara Bubula	26 September 2007	appointment as a member of the National Broadcasting Council	Witold Śmiałek
