= Rajmund =

Given name

Rajmund is the Polish and Hungarian equivalent of Raymond and may refer to:

- Rajmund Andrzejczak (born 1967), Poland Army general
- Rajmund Badó (1902–1986), Hungarian wrestler who competed in the 1924 Summer Olympics and the 1928 Summer Olympics
- Rajmund Bergel (1894–1937), Polish poet and military officer
- Rajmund Csányi (born 1936), Hungarian gymnast
- Rajmund Fodor (born 1976), Hungarian water polo player, who played on the gold medal squads at the 2000 and 2004 Summer Olympics
- Rajmund Kanelba (1897–1960), 20th century Polish painter
- Rajmund Karwicki (1906–1979), Polish fencer
- Rajmund Lehnert (born 1965), German cyclist
- Rajmund Mikuš (born 1995), Slovak footballer
- Rajmund Miller (1954–2024), Polish politician
- Rajmund Molnár (born 2002), Hungarian footballer
- Rajmund Moric (born 1944), Polish politician
- Rajmund Rembieliński (1774–1820), Polish nobleman (szlachcic), political activist, and landowner
- Rajmund Stachurski (1935–2004), Polish sport shooter
- Rajmund Tóth (born 2004), Hungarian footballer
- Rajmund Zamanja (1587–1647), Croatian theologian, philosopher and linguist
- Rajmund Zieliński (1940–2022), Polish cyclist
