= Bogdan Gasiński =

Polish businessman and whistleblower

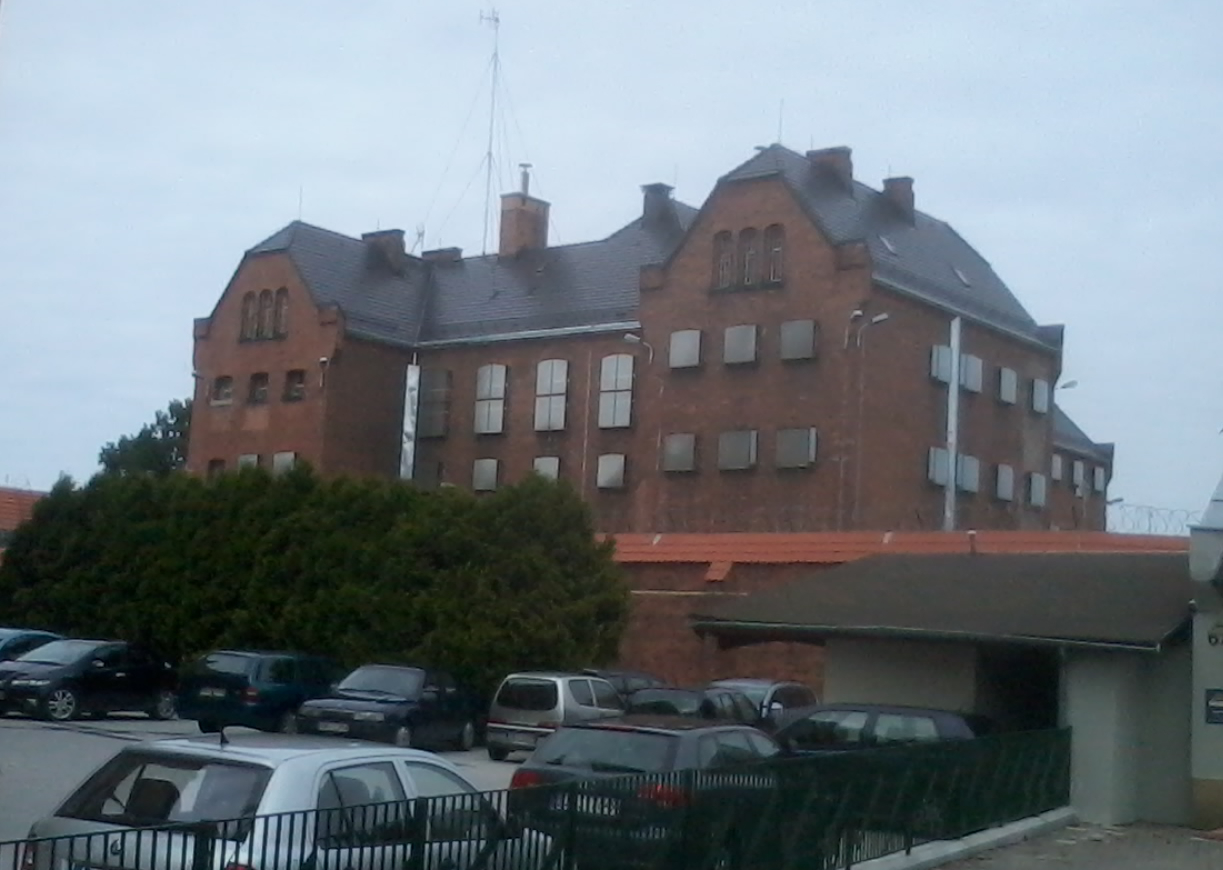
Prison in Kluczbork, where Gasiński was incarcerated as of 2016

Bogdan Gasiński (born November 2, 1971, in Kożuchów) is a Polish man who until 2001 worked as one of regional directors for a company named Inter Commerce owned by multimillionaire Rudolf Skowroński (missing since 2005). He gained notoriety in November/December 2001 as the supposed source of allegations about bribing of top Polish politicians by Skowroński, and as the source of allegations of visits by Afghan militants to the Polish village of Klewki related to alleged anthrax experimentation conducted there.

He has been associated with Rudolf Skowroński since 1992. He worked as a Director at Inter Commerce.

Other allegations by Gasiński are related to 9/11 perpetrators.

While Aleksander Makowski (a former top spy, an Inter Commerce employee (1990-1995 and 1998-2000), and Skowroński's partner in Afghanistan-related business ventures) confirmed one part of Gasiński's widely ridiculed claims in his 2014 book—he said that Afghan militants indeed visited Klewki, and that they were only Ahmad Shah Massoud's mujahideen—he dismissed other claims made by Gasiński, and a 2005 book published on the subject, as crazy.

Makowski himself described, in the aforementioned 2014 book, how Makowski and Skowroński traveled multiple times to the Panjshir Valley to meet with Massoud, how they traded in emeralds with the mujahideen, how they printed money in Poland which was to be used as an official currency by Massoud's Northern Alliance, how an attempt to supply weapons to the Afghans supposedly failed because Americans objected to it; and how Makowski's knowledge of Afghanistan became useful when he was later hired to provide intelligence to Polish soldiers in the war in Afghanistan. Gasiński however paints a different picture, alleging that they were providing weapons to the Afghans in exchange for drugs, mentioning the Northern Alliance's opium farming in this context.

Gasiński was sentenced to 38 years' imprisonment, all for non-violent crimes and animal cruelty.

== Chronology ==
Gasiński was one of three directors of Inter Commerce for the Masuria region. He claimed two other directors fled because they did not want anything to do with Inter Commerce's real field of activity. He says that personnel in Inter Commerce was regularly replaced, and that he himself was kept as an employee for years only because he agreed to "collaborate" (suggesting involvement with an intelligence agency, organized crime, or both). By his own account, in February 2001 Gasiński tried to withdraw from the company's activities, asking for a reassignment to some other location. Gasiński says he abandoned his post in Klewki after being threatened in April 2001. He also called public attention to himself by buying a car at a charity auction from the organizers of the country's most popular charity concert.

It is not clear what Gasiński was doing in the following months, in the middle of 2001. There are reports he was jailed for some reason in Jelenia Góra.

Later, on October 28, 2001, Gasinski apparently sent a letter to the DA's office. The letter makes the following claims:

- That Rudolf Skowroński, head of Inter Commerce, was a close friend of Andrzej "Słowik" Zieliński and was meeting regularly with some other gangsters of the Pruszków gang; that the Pruszków gang and Inter Commerce were so closely linked they were practically the same organization; and that the gang distributed Skowroński's drugs in Poland and abroad
- that Skowroński's emerald trade with Afghanistan was just a cover for importing drugs, and that Skowroński paid the Afghans back with guns, and also supplied bioweapons to the Afghans
- that local and regional officials, including police officials, in the Masuria region were routinely bribed by Skowroński
- that Skowroński also paid for the campaigns of top (not local) politicians; the letter mentions at least one of them by name
- that Gasiński himself helped Ryszard Niemczyk escape from the country by transporting him from Kraków to Nowy Sącz on October 31, 2000, and that Ryszard Niemczyk was the killer of Marek Papała (head of the Polish police)
- that in September 2000 Gasiński himself supplied plans of some objects to Afghan nationals at Nice Airport; and that on the same day at Frankfurt Airport he received a package from a citizen of a Middle Eastern country destined for Skowroński, that package containing plans of Frankfurt Airport
- that Gasiński himself gave and received, multiple times, packages containing plans (maps) of passenger jets (Embraer, Boeing 767), of Okęcie Airport, of hotels, of railway/bus stations etc. (and other packages that he could not open without leaving evidence of tampering) and at two times, money shipments; that the meeting points where handovers took place were often in Bochum, Düsseldorf, Munich, Paris, and they happened also in Szczecin, Poznań, Kraków; and most interestingly, that the parcels were addressed to Mohamed Ali (sic) Atta, Hassan Algadi Banihammad, Abdulaziz Alomari, Mahand [Mohand] Alshehri and Saeed Alghamdi
- that Gasiński himself met Hassan Algadi Banihammad in 1997 in Poznań
- that one of the aforementioned (by name) recipients of parcels was a close acquaintance of Skowroński (and Gasiński saw that person more than one time at Chróścicki street in Warsaw)
- that Ryszard Niemczyk was in possession of detailed plans of a terror attack on the USA
- that some members of the Pruszków gang, including Jarosław "Chińczyk" Maringe, played an important role in "bomb attacks in the USA"

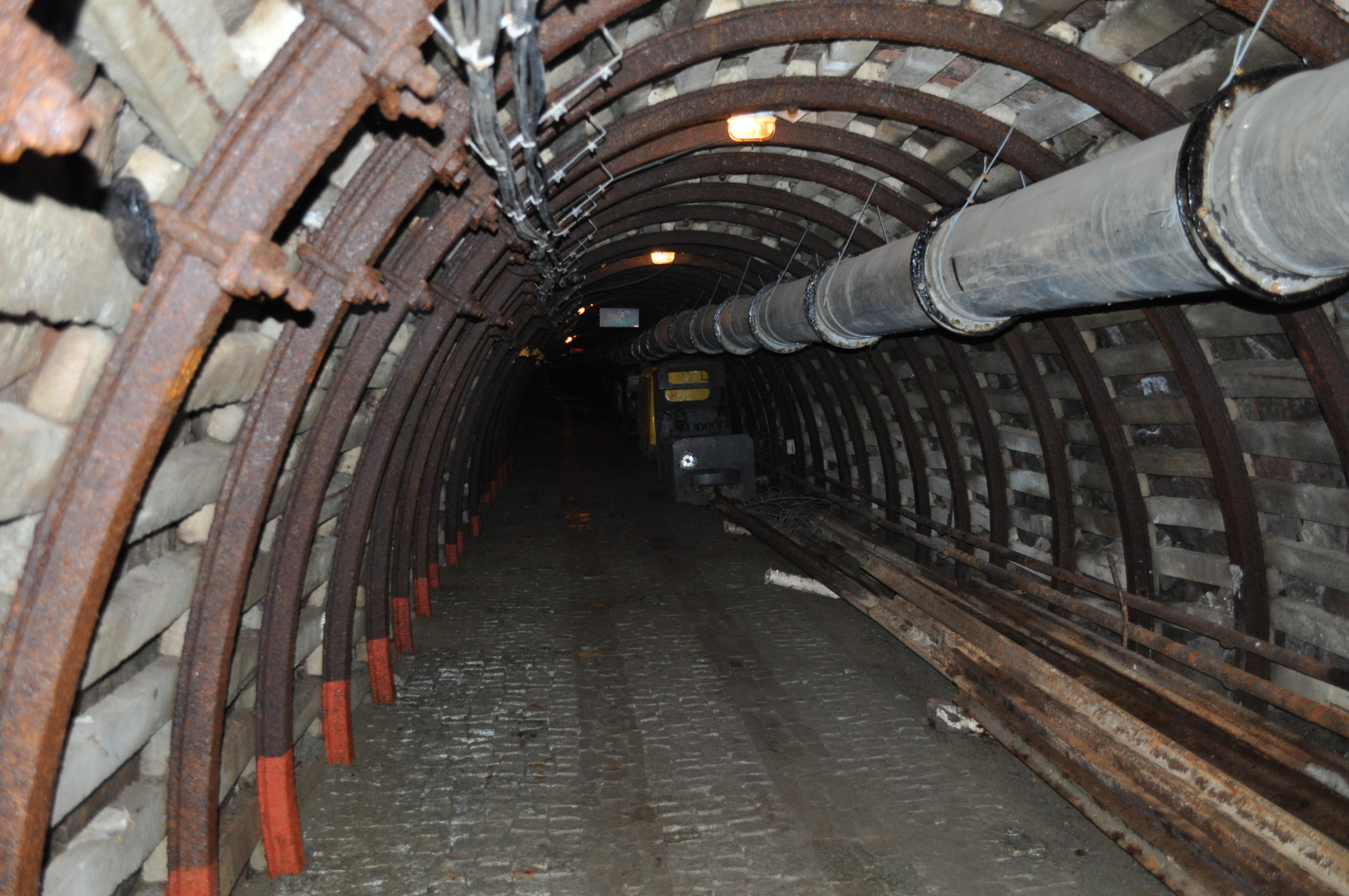
One of the adits in uranium mines near Kowary. The mining work here ended in 1973 and the mines are used only for university research and as a tourist attraction. Gasiński claims that in the 1990s, he and others were able to obtain 3 tonnes of material from these mines.

Gasiński claimed that earlier, in 1994-1999, he took part in overseeing mining work at a uranium mine in Kowary (formally closed).

Gasiński also mentioned anthrax experimentation (see below).

In later conversations with Maria Wiernikowska (December 2001), Gasiński recalled personally meeting Ahmad Shah Massoud in 1999 in the Czech Republic while working for Inter Commerce; he also said that Massoud's organization was supported mostly by opium trade. While Skowroński implied that the only Afghans he had been in contact with were Massoud and people from Massoud's organization, Gasiński also mentioned Skowroński maintaining contacts with "other people" in this context.

Only a month after sending the letter, at the end of November 2001, Gasiński went to the politician Andrzej Lepper with information about top politicians: Andrzej Olechowski, Paweł Piskorski and Jerzy Szmajdziński receiving money from Skowroński (later, in early December 2001, Gasiński repeated these allegations in a written report that he gave to Lepper and two other MPs: Łyżwiński and Żywiec). Lepper, who was a vice-marshal of the House and the leader of the Samoobrona political party, which had just become a major political power, publicly made these allegations (plus allegations against two other politicians) during a session of the House. A major scandal broke out. Gasiński was thrust into the spotlight. Lepper was sued by the politicians whom he accused, and in 2005 the court ruled in their favor, sentencing Lepper for slander.

Gazeta Wyborcza, Rzeczpospolita, Dziennik, Wprost and Polityka covered at least some of Gasiński's claims and kept writing about his legal problems even years later, but considered his claims unreliable or laughable.

Gasiński was then arrested in January 2002, but then released, and then unexpectedly made a "private trip" to Rome instead of meeting with the journalist Wiernikowska as scheduled. After returning, he met with Wiernikowska again (it was then when he implied to Wiernikowska that he had been working for Israeli intelligence the whole time) and also publicly retracted all his original claims, both in the public prosecutor's office and in an interview with Gazeta Wyborcza (spring 2002).

After this retraction, several things happened: Gasiński was sentenced to two and a half year in prison for defrauding Skowroński's Inter Commerce, while not present in court (June 2002); a top mob boss and a policeman were murdered in a shooting in Mikołajki (August 2002)—as Gasiński later claimed, this mob execution took place in front of his eyes; and Gasiński became associated with Skowroński again, living—as the media claimed, out of his own will—in Skowroński's house in Mikołajki (December 2002). That was despite Skowroński's previous characterization of Gasiński as an unimportant, self-aggrandizing farm worker and a thief. While Gasiński was staying in Skowroński's house, letters, supposedly written by Gasiński and expressing solidarity with bin Laden and Saddam Hussein, were being sent.

Although Gasiński later reverted to his original claims and in 2005, he reiterated the bribery claims in court, by that time he was a convict and a prisoner. He has been continuously in prison since October 2003 (with the exception of an escape in 2007, after which he was caught).

=== Earlier reports by Gasiński ===
Gasiński made at least some of his claims even before sending the aforementioned October 28, 2001, letter to a prosecutor's office in Olsztyn.

When Gasiński was interrogated in jail in Jelenia Góra "at the beginning of September" 2001, he made at least the claim about delivering money to the fugitive Ryszard Niemczyk in Kraków.

Gasiński made a report of crime to a prosecutor's office in Olsztyn at least twice (not necessarily to the same office); and at least two times it was ignored. At least one letter, containing a report of crime, was sent by Gasiński to a prosecutor's office from jail. At least one report of crime was filed by Gasiński later, on October 28, when Gasiński was a free man able to visit a newspaper's office (unless Gasiński was released immediately after filing the October 28 report of crime). It is not known is both reports of crime contained the same information.

Lepper says that Gasiński made a report of crime to a prosecutor's office in Olsztyn (either personally or by mail) on September 19. Head of a prosecutor's office in Olsztyn told the press that Gasiński came forward with his report, containing the anthrax accusations, "in September I think".

The importance of the timing of Gasiński's anthrax claims—whether it was in September or in October—is that although the anthrax letters were allegedly sent on September 18 (just a day after the Polish media published information about people affiliated with bin Laden's organization buying anthrax in the Czech Republic), the American press did not report on the anthrax letters before Robert Stevens' admission to a hospital (and his death) in October.

== Anthrax ==
Gasiński wrote to the DA's office - and maintained that it is the truth in his conversation with Maria Wiernikowska - that experiments were being secretly performed on cattle at Skowroński's ranch in Klewki. According to him, this included experimentation with E. coli and anthrax. He said cows were injected with what was supposed to be vaccines, coming from the Czech Republic and Israel, and mortality among the cattle was high. Gasiński said he was ordered to take milk samples from the cows, and these samples were shipped to a laboratory in Warsaw. He said the experimentation started in the summer of 2000, after two Afghan citizens, who arrived in a helicopter with Skowroński, were given a tour of the cowshed, and that Skowroński specifically claimed their visit was related to plans to test vaccines and build a lab.

Dead animals were reportedly not shipped to a utilization plant, but instead buried in three different places, close to lakes. Gasiński linked water poisoning in Klebark in 2000 (over two hundred people affected, a few in serious condition) to this activity and said the DA's office had also linked this water poisoning to Inter Commerce.

== Wiernikowska takes interest ==
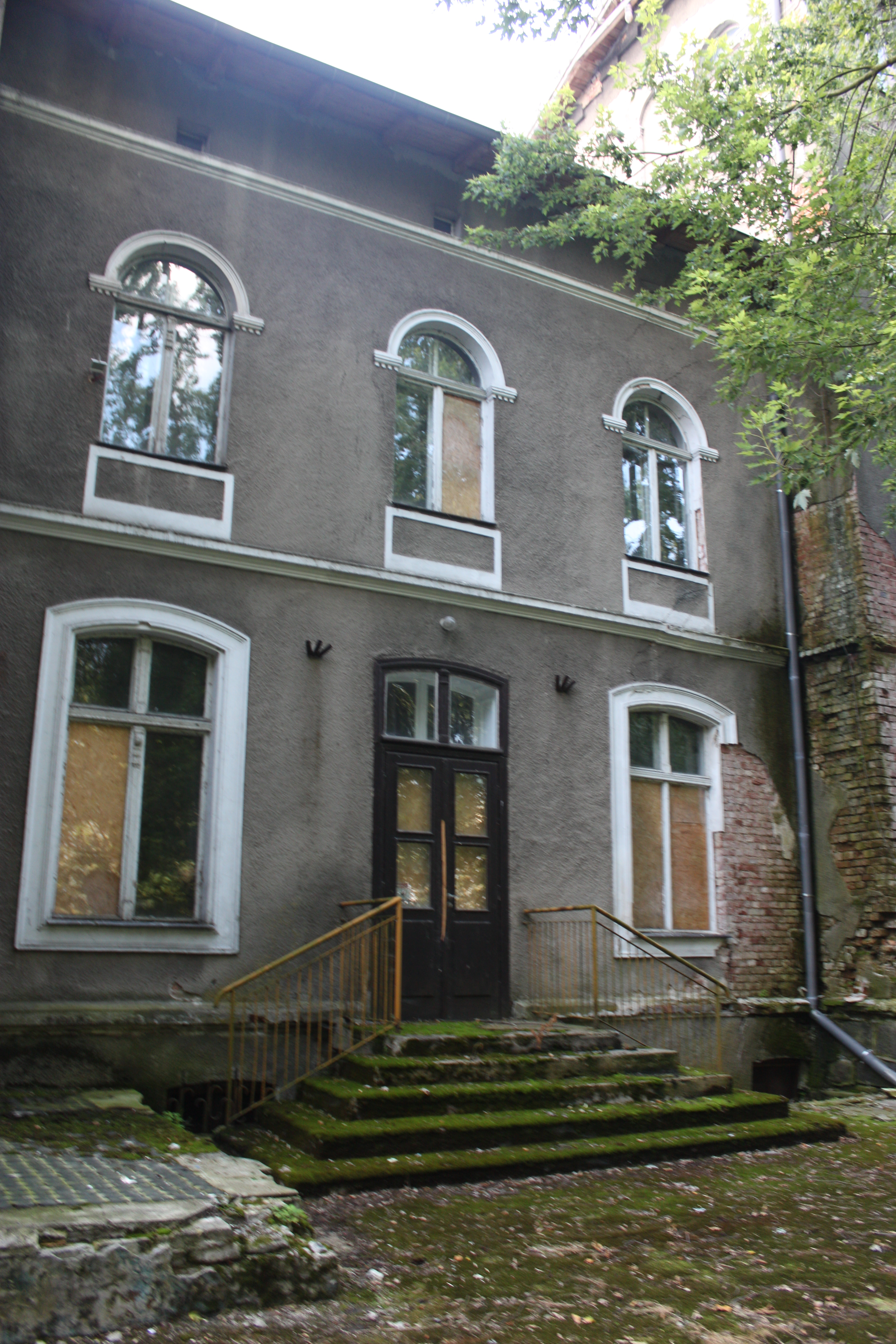
The former manor in Klewki, which was part of Skowroński's ranch before Skowroński disappeared

War correspondent Maria Wiernikowska was probably the only journalist who took Gasiński seriously. Other journalists portrayed Gasiński as a fraudster and/or as someone spreading fantasies influenced by media reports about 9/11. Wiernikowska noted links of Gasiński's place of employment to the Polish military intelligence WSI. A situation when Gasiński was escorted out of a restaurant by members of UOP instead of ordinary police also caught her attention. Gasiński pointed out to her the strange deaths of Tadeusz Rusiecki (owner of casinos and handler of real estate belonging to the Russian embassy in Warsaw), of Rusiecki's Russian associate, and the poisoning of Rigobert Tauber (founder of the first casino in Warsaw). All three died within days of each other in February 2001. Gasiński claimed Skowroński planted his right-hand man Ralf Friedriksen in Rusiecki's company.

However, Skowroński was still portrayed in the media as a legitimate businessman; he did not deny links to Afghanistan, but portrayed himself as a friend of Ahmad Shah Massoud and denied any wrongdoing.

Wiernikowska lost her job as a result of her continued interest in the subject. She later published a book entitled Zwariowałam (I went mad) in which she chronicled her investigation. A multitude of names in the book are censored (blacked out), even Skowroński's name, but not the name of Aleksander Makowski, a former spy from the People's Republic of Poland era who later continued intelligence work for WSI. Aleksander Makowski was an employee at Inter Commerce.

Wiernikowska mentioned the "rumor" that the person really ruling Inter Commerce was not Skowroński, but Aleksander Makowski. However, to shield herself from legal troubles, she ended her book with the following caveat: "All I have written here is complete untruth".

The book was published in 2005.

== Outcome ==
Rudolf Skowroński has been missing since 2005. He left a fortune in Poland (equivalent to about $37 million). In 2018, Polish Radio published information that Skowroński, who had been sentenced to 4 years' imprisonment in his youth, became a police collaborator later, and in the 1980s he was reporting to Departament I of the Polish Ministry of the Interior. Aleksander Makowski was one of the top officials of Departament I at that time.

Makowski was strongly criticized in a report related to the disbanding of WSI (which he had worked for), and sued the Polish Ministry of Defense because of claims the report contained. Makowski was a subject of two non-fiction books (one written by him and the other being an interview with him) before switching to writing spy fiction. He is still often interviewed by the media.

Out of the three MPs (Lepper, Łyżwiński and Żywiec) to whom Gasiński handed his report in December 2001, one (Łyżwiński) later spent two and a half years in prison for crimes including rape before actually being sentenced; the sentence was later overturned, and a new trial was postponed indefinitely for health reasons; not because of physical health (even though Łyżwiński required the use of a wheelchair after his prison stay) but because psychiatrists in a mental hospital, where he was ordered to be involuntarily committed for a period of time by the court, declared him unfit to stand trial. The other two are dead. Lepper died in what was ruled a suicide. Żywiec died in a strange car crash: he entered a car together with four friends as a passenger (one of his friends was driving) and then was found dead a short distance away next to the crashed car, alone. The car keys were never found. The car was cut to pieces as part of the investigation.

Gasiński was sentenced to over 38 years' imprisonment, all for non-violent crimes and animal cruelty. He was not allowed to be visited by journalists while in prison.

In late 2024 his sentence was reduced by 25 years, and he was released in January 2026.

== See also ==
- Bruce Edward Ivins

== Bibliography ==
- M. Majewski, P. Reszka, Zawód: szpieg. Rozmowy z Aleksandrem Makowskim, Wydawnictwo Czarna Owca, Warszawa 2014. ISBN 978-83-7554-813-6
- M. Wiernikowska, Zwariowałam czyli widziałam w Klewkach, Rosner i Wspólnicy, Warszawa 2005. ISBN 83-89217-74-0
