= Fiedorowicz =

Fiedorowicz is a surname. Notable people with the surname include:

- C. J. Fiedorowicz (born 1991), American football player
- Czesław Fiedorowicz (born 1958), Polish politician

== See also ==
- Fiedor
- Fedorowicz
- Taras Fedorovych
