= Marzena =

Marzena (Polish: [maˈʐɛna]) is a Polish feminine given name, and may refer to:

- Marzena Broda, Polish poet, novelist, playwright and screenwriter
- Marzena Godecki (born 1978), Polish-born Australian actress
- Marzena Karpińska (born 1988), Polish weightlifter
- Marzena Paduch (born 1965), Polish politician
- Marzena Wróbel (born 1963), Polish politician
- Marzena Wysocka (born 1969), female discus thrower from Poland
