= Mateusz Piskorski =

Polish politician

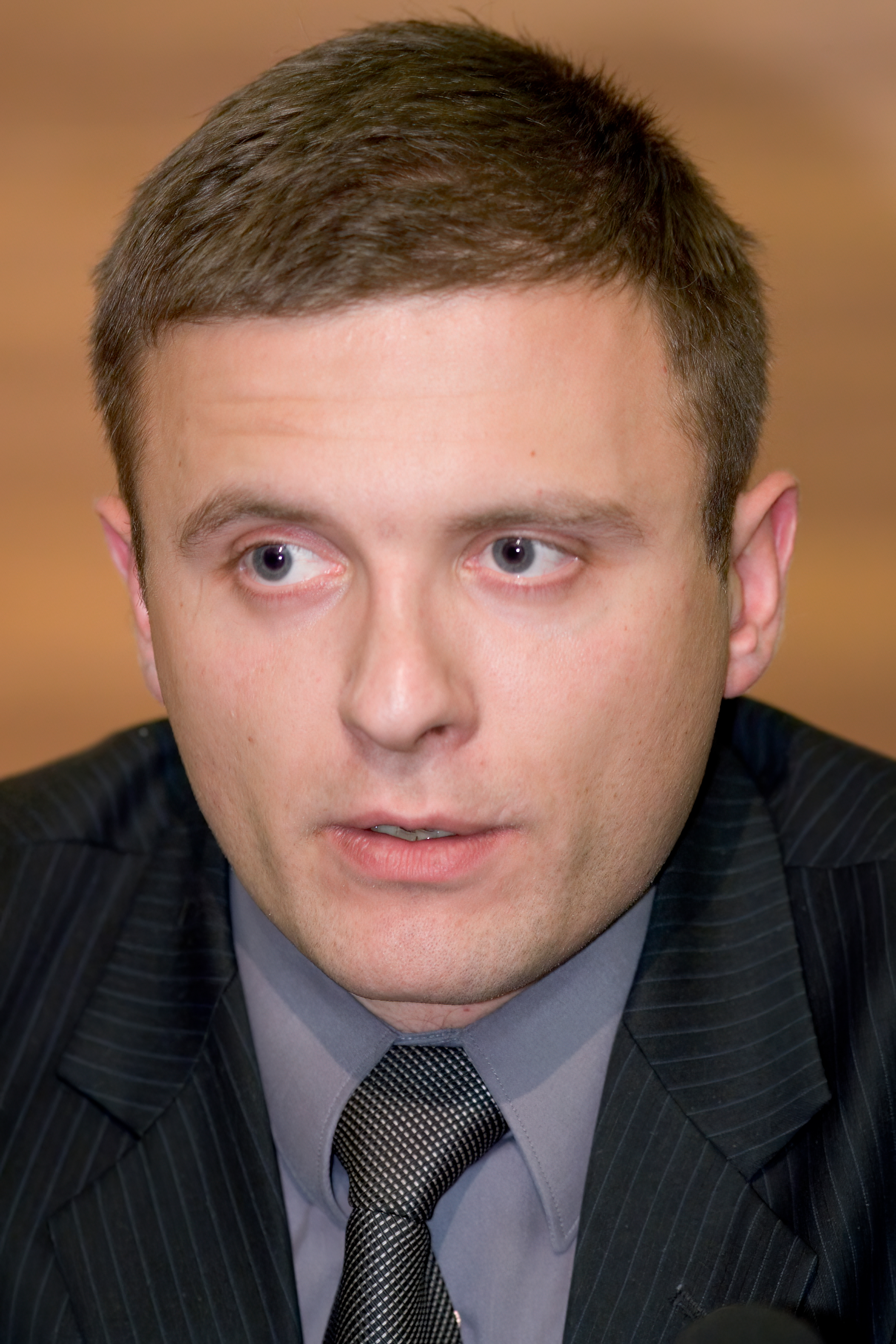
- Piskorski in 2005

Member of Sejm
- In office 25 September 2005 – 4 November 2007

Personal details
- Born: 18 May 1977 (age 49) Szczecin, Poland
- Party: Zmiana

Mateusz Andrzej Piskorski (born 18 May 1977) is a Polish politician and publicist.

== Education and professional work ==
In 2001, he graduated in Political Science from the University of Szczecin. In January 2011, he received his doctorate at the Faculty of Political Science and Journalism of Adam Mickiewicz University in Poznań for a dissertation was titled "Samoobrona in Polish political party system".

In 2002, he became a lecturer at the University of Szczecin. He worked there until 2005. He also lectured at the Collegium Balticum and the High School of Pedagogy in Szczecin and, in 2007, returned to the University of Szczecin. In 2008, he was elected a president of the "Society for Polish–Venezuelan Partnership". He also became the president of the board of Nord Media Press and worked at polish NBC. From December 2009 to December 201, he was deputy director of Polish Radio Euro. He was a lecturer at the Jan Długosz University in Częstochowa.

Piskorski was a co-founder in 2007 of the European Center of Geopolitical Analysis (Europejskie Centrum Analiz Geopolitycznych - ECAG), a pro-Eurasianism Polish thinktank dealing with issues of geopolitics.

== Political activity ==
As a student, Piskorski joined the Polish People's Party. He was also active in various societies promoting the idea of pan-Slavism. He was an activist of the far-right neo-pagan "Niklot" society and worked in organizations with a popular-patriotic profile, such as the National-Democratic Party. An influence on his political activities was the ideas of Polish political philosopher Jan Stachniuk (leader of the pre-war society "Zadruga"). Those ideas combine on the one hand passionate patriotism, and on the other consequent anti-capitalism and anti-globalism. In 2000, he travelled to Russia at the invitation of Pavel Tulaev to meet with other far-right and pan-Slavic activists there. He maintains close contacts with continentalists from all over Europe who consistently argue for "de-Americanisation of the Old Continent" and for the construction of Euro-continental cooperation "from Lisbon to Vladivostok".

In 2000, Piskorski quit the People's Party and in 2002 joined the Self-Defence of the Republic of Poland party to become the assistant to Member of Parliament Jan Łączny. He quit his PhD in 2005 to devote himself to politics. In 2005, he also became one of principal members of Andrzej Lepper's electoral committee during the Polish 2005 presidential election.

In the Polish 2005 parliamentary election, Piskorski successfully ran for the Sejm from the Szczecin constituency. As a deputy. he was a vice-chairman of the Reprivatization Committee and worked in the Foreign Affairs Committee and the Statutory Committee. He also represented Polish Parliament in the Assembly of Western European Union. The following year, he also ran for president of Szczecin in the 2006 local elections, but withdrew before the elections and supported a Law and Justice candidate instead. He failed to defend his seat in the Polish 2007 parliamentary election and failed to return to the parliament in the 2011 parliamentary election (this time running as a candidate of Polish Labour Party (Sierpień 80)).

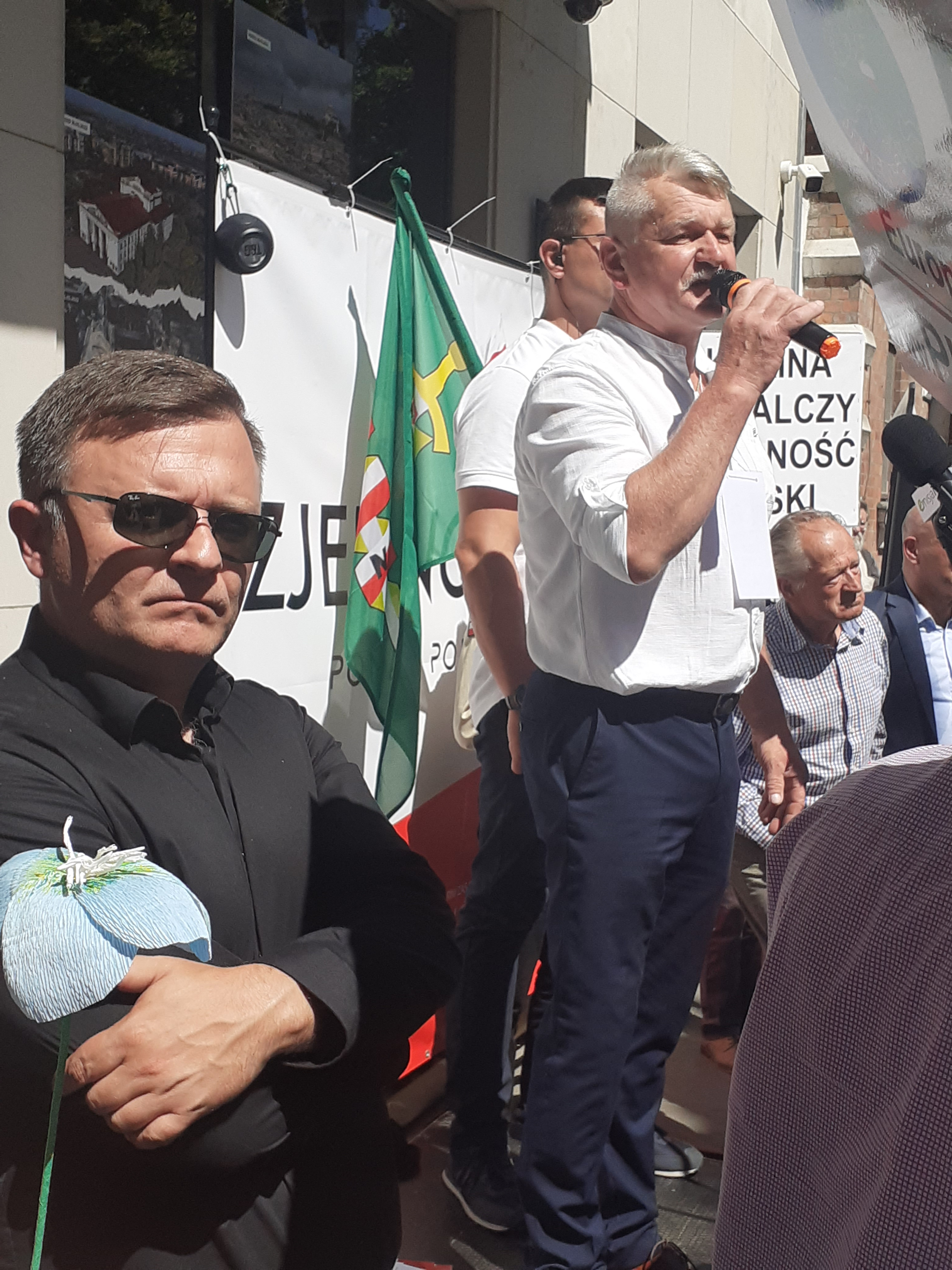
Mateusz Piskorski and Krzysztof Tołwiński in 2023.

In February 2015, Mateusz Piskorski founded a new political party called "Zmiana" ("Change"), being a political platform that combines left-wing anti-capitalist views with anti-imperialist, pacifistic social policies. At the founding meeting, were representatives of the self-proclaimed Novorossiya to inform the Polish public about their views on the Russo-Ukrainian War. Piskorski and his wife Marina Klebanovich received funding from Russian actors through "The International Agency for Current Policy". Klebanovich worked as a coordinator for the Agency's operations in Europe.

In May 2016, shortly before the NATO summit, Piskorski was detained by the Internal Security Agency on the charges of "cooperation with Russian intelligence services, meeting intelligence officers and undertaking operational tasks from them as well as accepting payments". Sources internal to the Zmiana party have described the detention as: "an attempt to intimidate those whose views on foreign, domestic and socioeconomic policy differ from those of the government". UN Working Group on Arbitrary detentions has asked to release him, in 2018. On 16 May 2019 Piskorski was released on bail. Both rightists such as Janusz Korwin-Mikke and Grzegorz Braun and leftists such as Piotr Ikonowicz supported his release. Since 2025, Piskorski came to be described as a national communist.

== Election monitoring ==
Mateusz Piskorski, as an expert and political scientist, participated and co-organized a number of "election monitoring missions", including elections unrecognized by OSCE and UN, since 2007 organised by the European Center of Geopolitical Analysis (ECAG):

- 2004 Belarusian parliamentary election
- 2009 Abkhazian presidential election
- 2010 Belarusian presidential election
- Latvian regional elections, 2011
- 2011 Estonian parliamentary election
- Russian regional elections, 2011
- 2011 Latvian parliamentary dissolution referendum
- 2011 Berlin state election
- 2012 Armenian parliamentary election
- 2012 Nagorno-Karabakh presidential election
- 2014 Crimean status referendum
- 2014 Russian regional elections
