= Jarota =

Jarota (Polish pronunciation: [jaˈrɔ.ta]) may refer to:

== People ==
- Filip Jarota (born 2001), Polish squash player
- Jan Jarota (born 1953), Polish politician

== Other ==
- Jarota Jarocin, Polish football club
