= Zadora =

Zadora may refer to:

- Zadora coat of arms, a Polish coat of arms
- Pia Zadora (born 1954), American actress and singer
- Stanisław Zadora (born 1949), Polish politician
