= Chłopek =

Chłopek is a Polish surname derived from the word meaning "peasant". It has archaic feminine forms (still used colloquially): Chłopkowa (after husband), Chłopkówna (after father). Notable people with the surname include:

- Aleksander Chłopek (born 1946), Polish politician
- Anthony Chlopek (1880–1937), American labor union leader
