= Paduch =

Paduch is a surname. Notable people with the surname include:

- Abigail Paduch (born 2000), Australian judoka
- Arno Paduch (born 1965), German musician
- Marzena Paduch (born 1965), Polish politician
