= Szymon Pawłowski =

Szymon Pawłowski may refer to:

- Szymon Pawłowski (politician), Polish politician
- Szymon Pawłowski (footballer), Polish footballer
