= Kawa =

Kawa may refer to:

== Places ==
- Kawa, Myanmar, a village
- Kawa Township, Myanmar
- Kawa, Sudan
- Kawa, Togo
- Kawa River, Indonesia

== People ==
- Kawa (surname)
- Kawa Ada (born 1982), Canadian actor, writer and producer
- Kawa Hesso (born 1984), Syrian football player

== Others ==
- Kawa (film) (also known as Nights in the Gardens of Spain), a 2010 New Zealand film
- KAWA, a radio station (89.7 FM) licensed to serve Sanger, Texas, United States
- Kawa (Scheme implementation), a language framework written in Java
- Kawa language
- Kawa or Kawah, other name for the wok
- Kawa model, conceptual model in occupational therapy

== See also ==
- Kahwa, a Kashmiri form of massala chai
- Kava, a plant
- Kāve, mythical figure in Iranian mythology
- Kawakawa (disambiguation)
