= Kawa (surname) =

Kawa is a surname with multiple origins. Notable people with this surname include:

- Cosei Kawa, Japanese illustrator
- Dooz Kawa (1984 or 1985–2025), French rapper
- Florence Kawa (1912–2008), American artist
- Franciszek Kawa (1901–1985), Polish skier
- Jakub Kawa (born 1988), Polish footballer
- Joanna Marszałek-Kawa, Polish lawyer
- Katarzyna Kawa (born 1992), Polish tennis player
- Marek Kawa (born 1975), Polish politician
- Sebastian Kawa (born 1972), Polish glider pilot
