= Edward Józef Kiedos =

Polish politician

member of Sejm 2005–2007
- In office 25 September 2005 – ?

Personal details
- Born: 1961 (age 64–65)
- Party: Samoobrona

Edward Józef Kiedos (born 18 March 1961 in Wieluń) is a Polish politician. He was elected to Sejm on 25 September 2005, getting 6016 votes in 11 Sieradz districts as a candidate from the Samoobrona Rzeczpospolitej Polskiej list.

== See also ==
- Members of Polish Sejm 2005–2007
