= Andrzej Fedorowicz =

Andrzej Fedorowicz may refer to:

- Andrzej Fedorowicz (politician) (born 1950), Polish politician
- Andrzej Fedorowicz (actor) (born 1942), Polish actor
