= Fedorovich =

In East Slavic languages, Fedorovich or Fyodorovich (transliteration from Ukrainian: Fedorovych) may be a patronymic part of a personal name or a patronymic surname, both derived from the given name Fedor, Theodor, literally meaning "son of Fedor". The Polish-language spelling is Fedorowicz.

Notable people with this surname include:

- Aleksandr Fedorovich (born 1973), Belarusian footballer (goalkeeper)

Notable people addressed by this patronymic include:

- Ivan Fyodorov (printer), a 16th-century East Slavic printing pioneer, also signed as "Ivn Fedorovich", "Ivan Fedorov's son", etc.
- Taras Fedorovych, a Cossack Hetman
