= Jan Walenty Tomaka =

Polish politician

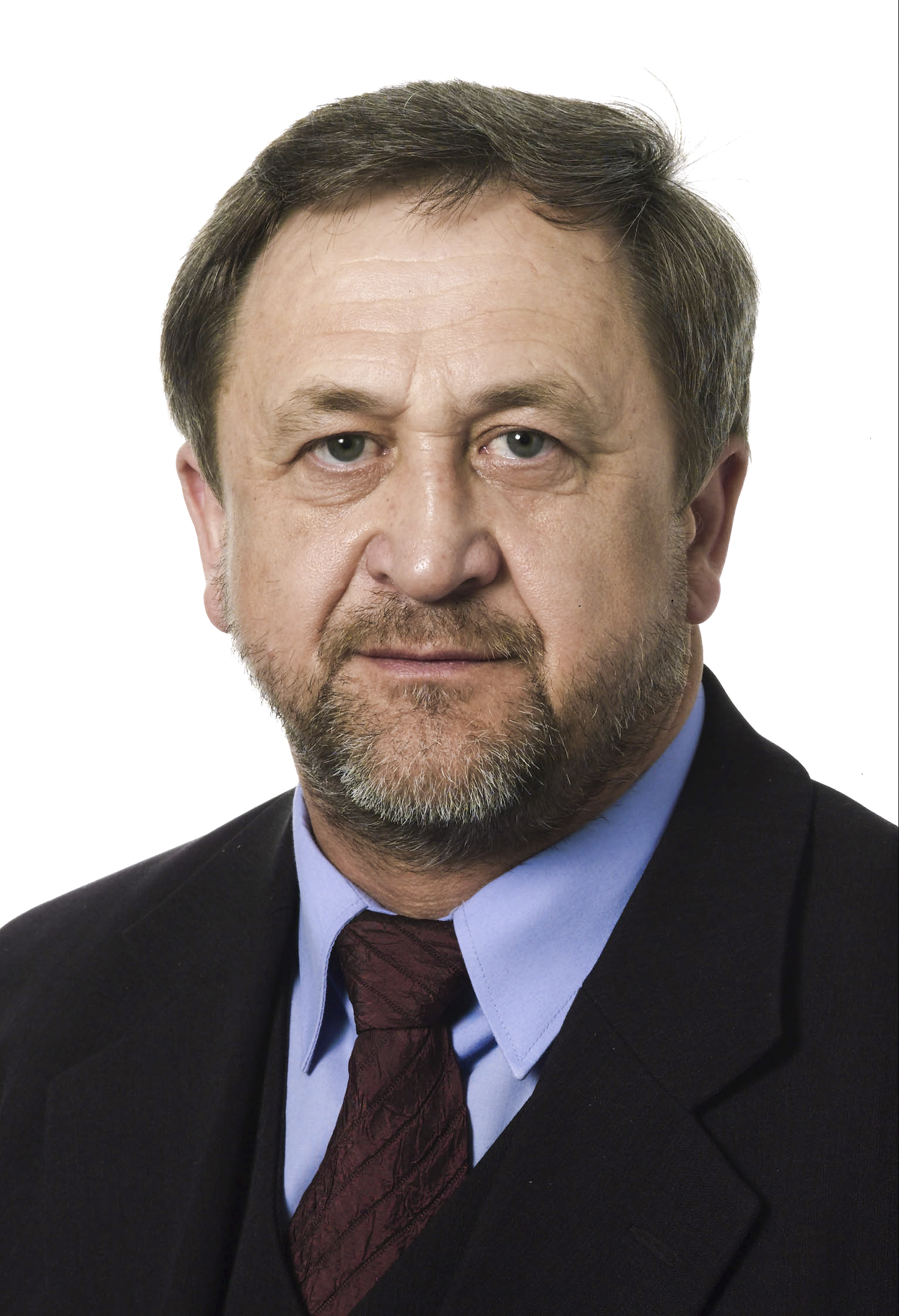

Member of Sejm 2005-2007
- In office 25 September 2005 – ?

Personal details
- Born: 15 January 1949 (age 77)
- Party: Civic Platform

Jan Walenty Tomaka (born 15 January 1949 in Nowa Wieś) is a Polish politician. He was elected to the Sejm on 25 September 2005 getting 7915 votes in 23 Rzeszów district as a candidate from the Civic Platform list.

He was also a member of Sejm 2001-2005.

He graduated from the university of Krakow in 1971 with a MSc in geology.

== See also ==
- Members of Polish Sejm 2005-2007
