= Elżbieta Wiśniowska =

Polish politician

member of Sejm 2005-2007
- In office 25 September 2005 – 2007

Personal details
- Born: June 16, 1975 (age 50) Ząbkowice Śląskie
- Party: Samoobrona

Elżbieta Aleksandra Wiśniowska (born 16 June 1975 in Ząbkowice Śląskie) is a Polish politician. She was elected to the Sejm on 25 September 2005, getting 4839 votes in 14 Nowy Sącz district as a candidate from Samoobrona Rzeczpospolitej Polskiej list.

== See also ==
- Members of Polish Sejm 2005-2007
