= Mirosław Orzechowski =

Polish politician

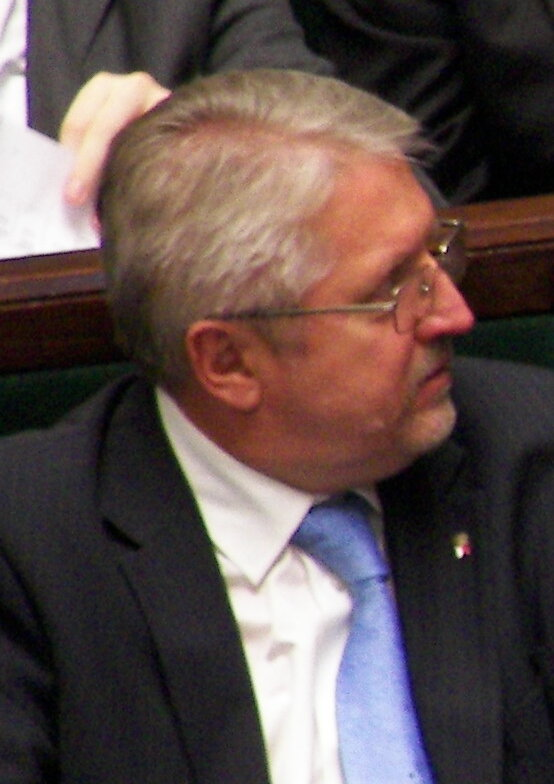

Member of the Sejm
- In office 25 September 2005 – 2007

Personal details
- Born: 28 September 1957 (age 68)
- Party: LPR (League of Polish Families)

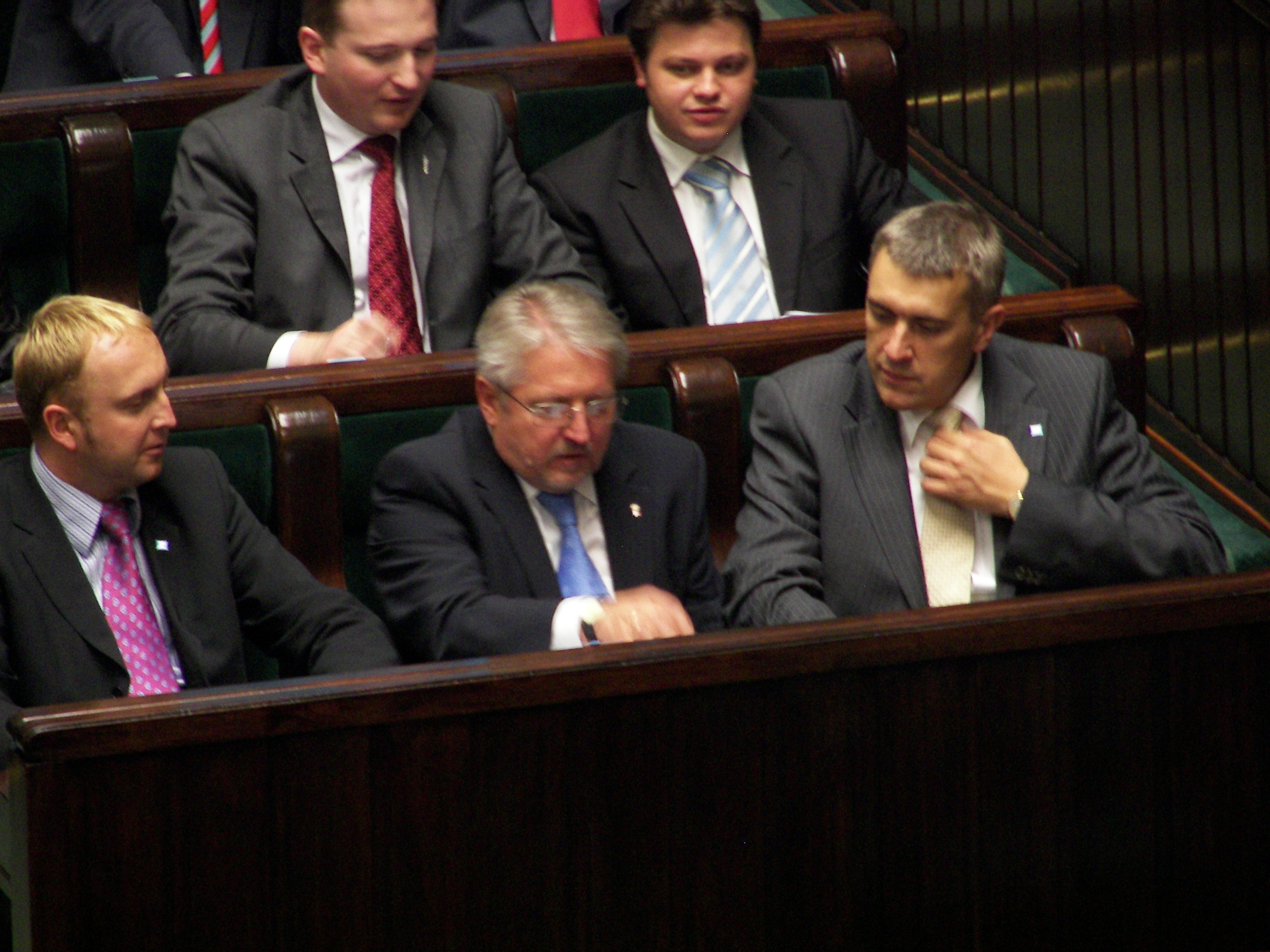
20070907 sejm rp 100B5384.jpg

Mirosław Orzechowski (Polish pronunciation: [mʲiˈrɔswav ɔʐɛˈxɔfskʲi]; born 28 September 1957 in Łódź) is a Polish politician. He was elected to Sejm on 2005, as a candidate from the League of Polish Families list. In Jarosław Kaczyński's government he was a deputy minister of national education.

== Biography ==
Orzechowski promotes strong anti-homosexual views, being (together with Roman Giertych) a proponent of legislation banning any form of broadly defined promotion of homosexuality and other deviations in schools under threat of severe punishment, including imprisonment. He also actively pursues legislation banning any identified homosexual person from working with children in public education institutions of any level. He publicly confirmed his intentions of sacking any homosexual teacher during numerous interviews in Polish media on 15 March 2007, the strongest statement being aired by Radio Tok FM.

Orzechowski holds the theory of evolution to be false and wants to introduce teaching of creationism in schools. This led 1,135 Polish scientists to demand his dismissal as deputy minister of education.

On 25 March 2008, in an interview with TVN24, he publicly proposed the idea of prohibiting sex before the age of 18 and was supported by Ewa Sowińska in this matter. The idea was dropped from the debate after massive criticism.

In June 2008 he wrote a letter to the President of Poland Lech Kaczyński, calling for revoking Polish citizenship of soccer players taking part in matches against the Poland national team. However, pursuant to Article 34 of the Constitution of the Republic of Poland, Poles cannot lose their citizenship without their consent. When this was brought to his attention, he proposed to change the constitution so that playing in the national football team of any other country would be interpreted as an act of voluntarily abandoning Polish citizenship. The background of this proposal was Poland's defeat against Germany in the European Football Championship 2008. Lukas Podolski, whose family had left Poland when he was two and who never formally lost Polish citizenship, had scored both goals in this match.

Orzechowski ran for the Senate in the Krosno constituency by-election on 22 June 2008 but failed to gain enough votes.

On 6 March 2009 he had been charged with driving under the influence of alcohol. On 14 July 2009 he pleaded guilty to the charge and, subject to a plea agreement, he was ordered to pay a 5000 PLN fine, donate 500 PLN to a car accident relief charity and banned from driving any vehicles for three years.

== See also ==
- Members of Polish Sejm 2005-2007
