= Mieczysław Aszkiełowicz =

Polish politician

Deputy of the Sejm
- In office 2001 – 2007
- Constituency: 35 Olsztyn

Personal details
- Born: 12 January 1957 (age 68) Olsztyn, Polish People's Republic
- Political party: Samoobrona RP

Mieczysław Aszkiełowicz (born 12 January 1957 in Olsztyn) is a Polish politician. He was elected to the Sejm on 25 September 2005, getting 5892 votes in 35 Olsztyn district as a candidate from Samoobrona Rzeczpospolitej Polskiej list.

He was also a member of Sejm 2001-2005.

== See also ==
- Members of Polish Sejm 2005-2007
