= Fedorowicz =

Fedorowicz is a Polish-language surname. It is a unisex surname in modern times; the archaic feminine form is Fedorowiczowa. It is the Polonized form of the Ruthenian (East Slavic) surname and patronymic Fedorovich, derived from the Ruthenian first name Fedor (Theodor).

Notable people with this surname include:

- J.J. Fedorowicz of J.J. Fedorowicz Publishing
- John Fedorowicz (born 1958), American International Grandmaster of chess
- Jerzy Fedorowicz (born 1947), Polish actor, theatre director, poet, politician
- Andrzej Fedorowicz (disambiguation)
