= Stanisław Papież =

Polish politician (1965–2023)

Member of the Sejm
- In office November 2006 – 19 September 2007
- Preceded by: Marek Kotlinowski
- In office 19 October 2001 – 18 October 2005

Personal details
- Born: 29 March 1965 Kraków, Poland
- Died: 29 August 2023 (aged 58)
- Party: LPR
- Education: Academy of Theology
- Occupation: Journalist

Stanisław Papież (29 March 1965 – 29 August 2023) was a Polish journalist and politician. A member of the League of Polish Families, he served in the Sejm from 2001 to 2005 and again from 2006 to 2007.

Papież died on 29 August 2023, at the age of 58.
