= Kawakawa =

Kawakawa may refer to:

- Kawakawa, New Zealand, a town
- Kawakawa River
- Kawakawa (fern) (Blechnum fluviatile)
- Kawakawa (fish) (Euthynnus affinis)
- Kawakawa (tree) (Piper excelsum)

== See also ==
- Kawa (disambiguation)
- Kavakava
