= Wojciech Romaniuk =

Polish politician

member of Sejm 2005-2007
- In office 25 September 2005 – 2007

Personal details
- Born: 1970 (age 55–56)
- Party: Samoobrona

Wojciech Maciej Romaniuk (born 20 January 1970 in Biała Podlaska) is a Polish politician. He was elected to the Sejm on 25 September 2005, getting 10719 votes in 7 Chełm district as a candidate from the Samoobrona Rzeczpospolitej Polskiej list.

== See also ==
- Members of Polish Sejm 2005-2007
