= Daniela Chrapkiewicz =

Polish politician (born 1948)

Member of the Sejm
- Incumbent
- Assumed office 18 June 2009; 25 September 2005 – 21 October 2007
- Constituency: 25 – Gdańsk

Personal details
- Born: 9 March 1948 (age 78) Starogard Gdański
- Party: Law and Justice

Daniela Jadwiga Chrapkiewicz (born 9 March 1948 in Starogard Gdański) is a Polish politician. She was elected to the Sejm on 25 September 2005, getting 3,657 votes in 25 Gdańsk district as a candidate from the Law and Justice list.

== See also ==
- Members of Polish Sejm 2005-2007
