= Jerzy Zawisza =

Polish politician

member of Sejm 2005-2007
- In office 25 September 2005 – 2007

Personal details
- Born: 19 December 1943 (age 82)
- Party: Samoobrona

Jerzy Zawisza (born 19 December 1943 in Borek Wielki) is a Polish politician. He was elected to Sejm on 25 September 2005, getting 5338 votes in 15 Tarnów district as a candidate from the Samoobrona Rzeczpospolitej Polskiej list.

== See also ==
- Members of Polish Sejm 2005-2007
