= Renata Rochnowska =

Polish politician (born 1949)

member of Sejm 2005-2007
- In office 25 September 2005 – 2007

Personal details
- Born: 2 February 1949 (age 77)
- Party: Samoobrona

Renata Maria Rochnowska (born 2 February 1949 in Wawrowice) is a Polish politician. She was elected to the Sejm on 25 September 2005, getting 7411 votes in 34 Elbląg district as a candidate from the Samoobrona Rzeczpospolitej Polskiej list.

She was also a member of Sejm 2001-2005.

== See also ==
- Members of Polish Sejm 2005-2007
