= Wanda Łyżwińska =

Polish politician (born 1953)

member of Sejm 2005-2007
- In office 25 September 2005 – 2007

Personal details
- Born: 9 July 1953 (age 72) Piaseczno
- Party: Samoobrona RP
- Spouse: Stanisław Łyżwiński
- Children: 2

Wanda Łyżwińska, née Kapusta (born 9 July 1953, in Piaseczno) is a Polish former politician. She was elected to the Sejm on 25 September 2005, getting 7842 votes in 17 Radom district as a candidate from Samoobrona Rzeczpospolitej Polskiej list.

She was also a member of Sejm 2001-2005.

== See also ==
- Members of Polish Sejm 2005-2007
