= Iwona Arent =

Polish politician (born 1968)

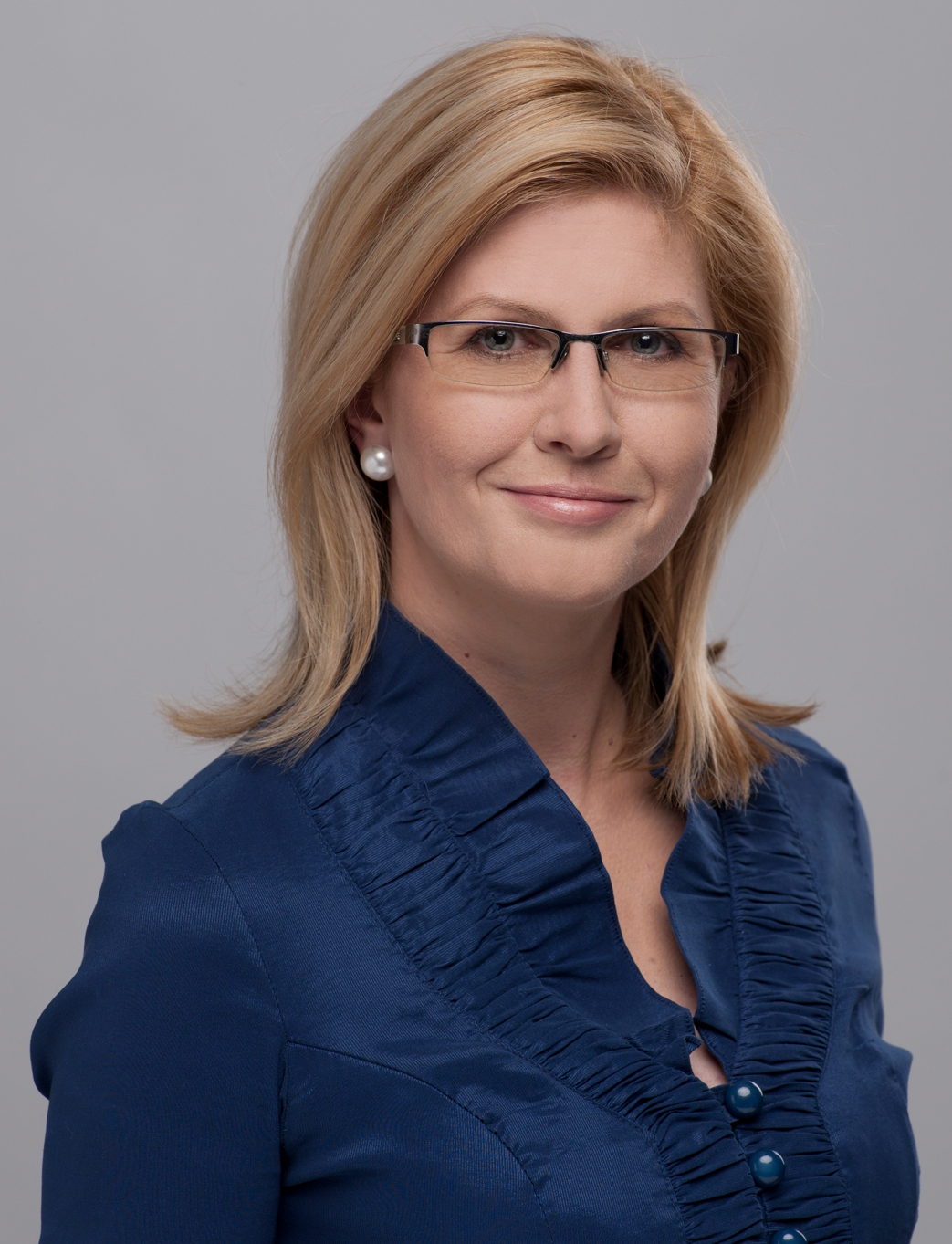

Member of the Sejm
- Incumbent
- Assumed office 22 August 2006
- Constituency: 35 - Olsztyn

Personal details
- Born: 4 June 1968 (age 58) Olsztyn, Poland
- Party: Law and Justice
- Education: University of Warmia and Mazury in Olsztyn
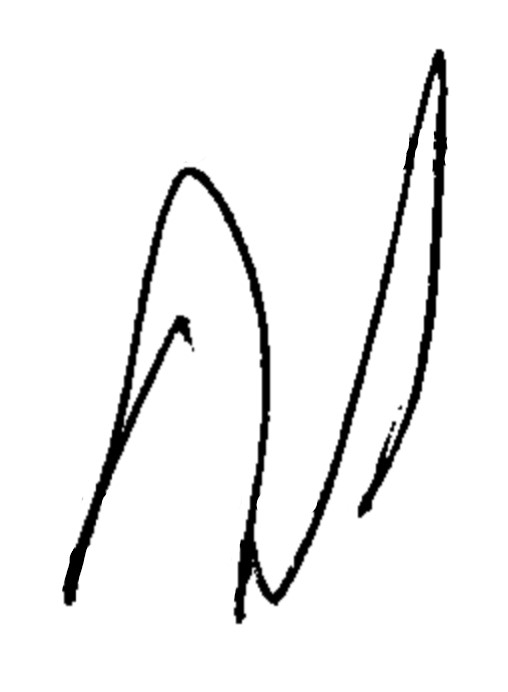
- Signature

Iwona Ewa Arent (née Grykiel; born 4 June 1968 in Olsztyn) is a Polish politician and political scientist, member of the Sejm of the 5th, 6th, 7th, 8th, 9th and 10th terms and a delegate to the Parliamentary Assembly of the Council of Europe.

== Biography ==
In the 1980s, Arent was active in Catholic youth organizations.

Arent graduated from IV High School in Olsztyn. In 1999, she completed her master's degree in political science and social sciences at the Faculty of Humanities at the Higher School of Pedagogy in Olsztyn. She then spent three years studying accounting at the University of Warmia and Masuria in Olsztyn. In 2012, she graduated from the International Relations and Diplomacy postgraduate programme at Collegium Civitas.

In 2002, she joined the Law and Justice Party (PiS) and became, among others, deputy chairman of the party's Olsztyn regional office, and held the post of treasurer. She ran unsuccessfully for the 2004 European Parliament election in the Olsztyn-Białystok constituency. In the 2005 Polish parliamentary election, Arent ran on the Law and Justice list in the Olsztyn constituency. She assumed her seat in the Sejm on 22 August 2006, during the fifth term of the Sejm, replacing Aleksander Szczygło, who was appointed as chief of the Chancellery of the President of the Republic of Poland. In the 2007 Polish parliamentary election, she became an MP for the second time, receiving 7,187 votes. In 2009, she ran unsuccessfully on the PiS list in the European Parliament election in Podlaskie and Warmian-Masurian.

In the 2011 Polish parliamentary election she successfully ran for re-election, receiving 11,955 votes. In the 2014 European Parliament election, she ran again on the list of Law and Justice in Podlaskie and Warmian-Masurian and failed to obtain a seat as an MEP, gaining 5,848 votes. In the local elections in the same year, she came third among seven candidates for mayor of Olsztyn. In 2015 she was re-elected to the Sejm, receiving 26,377 votes.

In the Sejm, she worked, among others, in the Justice and Human Rights Committee and the Legislative Committee. In addition, she was Vice-Chair of the Warmia and Mazury Parliamentary Group and Vice-Chair of the Parliamentary Group for the Defence of Freedom of Speech. She sat on the Extraordinary Committee for the Reduction of Bureaucracy. In the 8th term of the Sejm, she became Chair of the Constitutional Accountability Committee and a member of the Committee for Energy and the State Treasury. She also became a delegate to the Parliamentary Assembly of the Council of Europe. On 10 January 2018 she became a member of the commission of inquiry into Amber Gold. In the 2019 European Parliament election, she unsuccessfully ran for MEP. In the national election in the same year, she successfully ran for re-election as an MP, receiving 17,916 votes. In the Ninth Sejm, she again became Chair of the Constitutional Responsibility Committee, and also sat on the Energy and Treasury Committee and the Legislative Affairs Committee.
