= Krystian Łuczak =

Polish politician (born 1949)

member of Sejm 2005-2007
- In office 19 October 2001 – 4 November 2007

Personal details
- Born: 20 November 1949 (age 76)
- Party: Democratic Left Alliance

Krystian Walery Łuczak (born 20 November 1949 in Inowrocław) is a Polish politician. He was elected to the Sejm on 25 September 2005, getting 5,824 votes in 5 Toruń district as a candidate from Democratic Left Alliance list.

He was also a member of Sejm 2001-2005.

== See also ==
- Members of Polish Sejm 2005-2007
