= Józef Berger =

Polish politician

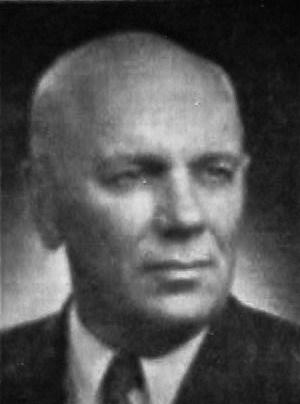
- Józef Berger

Member of the Silesian Parliament
- In office 1938–1939

Personal details
- Born: 14 March 1901 Orłowa, Austria-Hungary
- Died: 11 June 1962 (aged 61) Bratislava, Czechoslovakia
- Resting place: Ropice
- Party: Polish People's Party
- Spouse: Katarzyna Biela
- Children: Roman, Janusz, Irena
- Education: University of Warsaw
- Occupation: Theologian

Józef Berger (14 March 1901 – 11 June 1962) was a Polish Lutheran pastor, theologian and politician from the region of Trans-Olza, Czechoslovakia. He was a member of the Polish People's Party, a political party active amongst middle-class Lutherans of the Polish minority in interbellum Czechoslovakia.

== Biography ==
In 1920 Berger graduated from Juliusz Słowacki Polish Grammar School in Orlová, and in 1924 from the Theological Faculty of the University of Warsaw, where he studied the Protestant theology.

He was actively engaged in the life of the Polish community in Trans-Olza. It was mainly thanks to him that the new Lutheran church was built in 1932 in Czeski Cieszyn. From its foundation in 1922, he was one of the leading activists of the Polish People's Party in Czechoslovakia. After the annexation of the Trans-Olza region to Poland in 1938, President Ignacy Mościcki named him a deputy of the Silesian Parliament, where Berger was a deputy until the outbreak of World War II.

During the Nazi occupation he was interned in the Auschwitz and Dachau concentration camps.

From 1945 to 1952, he worked as a pastor at the Lutheran church in Český Těšín. On 25 June 1950 he was elected a superintendent of the Silesian Evangelical Church of the Augsburg Confession. In 1952, Berger was designated a professor of systematic theology at the Theological Academy in Modra near Bratislava and moved permanently to Bratislava.

Berger was also active in the tourist and skiing organizations of the Polish minority in Czechoslovakia. In his free time, he also enjoyed painting, covering mostly the landscapes of his native region.
