= Rajmund Moric =

Polish politician (born 1944)

member of Sejm 2005-2007
- In office 25 September 2005 – 2007

Personal details
- Born: 27 June 1944 (age 81) Katowice, Poland
- Party: Samoobrona

Rajmund Moric (born 27 June 1944 in Katowice) is a Polish politician. He was elected to the Sejm on 25 September 2005, getting 3091 votes in 29 Gliwice district as a candidate from the Samoobrona Rzeczpospolitej Polskiej list.

He was also a member of PRL Sejm 1985-1989.

== See also ==
- Members of Polish Sejm 2005-2007
