= Wojciech Łuczak =

Polish footballer (born 1989)

Personal information
- Full name: Wojciech Łuczak
- Date of birth: 28 July 1989 (age 37)
- Place of birth: Zgorzelec, Poland
- Height: 1.84 m (6 ft 1/2 in)
- Position: Midfielder

Team information
- Current team: Barycz Sułów
- Number: 2

Youth career
- Hutnik Pieńsk
- Piotrcovia Piotrków Trybunalski
- 2008–2010: Willem II

Senior career*
Years	Team	Apps	(Gls)
2010–2011	Cracovia	6	(0)
2011–2012	Górnik Łęczna	29	(11)
2012–2015	Górnik Zabrze	47	(4)
2013–2015	Górnik Zabrze II	10	(3)
2015–2016	Wisła Płock	30	(3)
2016–2017	Zagłębie Sosnowiec	45	(4)
2018–2020	ŁKS Łódź	50	(10)
2020–2021	Stomil Olsztyn	29	(3)
2021–2024	Radunia Stężyca	93	(19)
2024–	Barycz Sułów	66	(32)
- * Club domestic league appearances and goals as of 09:02, 26 June 2026 (UTC)

Wojciech Łuczak (born 28 July 1989) is a Polish professional footballer who plays as a midfielder for III liga club Barycz Sułów.

== Career ==
In the winter of 2010, he joined Polish club Cracovia on a 2 1/2-year contract. He was released from Cracovia on 1 July 2011.

In July 2011, he signed a contract with Górnik Łęczna.

In January 2018, he moved to ŁKS Łódź.

On 23 September 2020, he joined Stomil Olsztyn on a two-year contract.

== Honours ==
Barycz Sułów

- IV liga Lower Silesia: 2025–26
- Polish Cup (Wrocław regionals): 2024–25
