= Jan Łączny =

Polish politician

member of Sejm 2005-2007
- In office 25 September 2005 – ?

Personal details
- Born: 19 December 1950 (age 75)
- Party: Samoobrona

Jan Łączny (born 19 December 1950 in Dobrzyca) is a Polish politician. He was elected to Sejm on 25 September 2005, getting 2229 votes in 40 Koszalin district as a candidate from the Samoobrona Rzeczpospolitej Polskiej list.

He was also a member of Sejm 2001-2005.

== See also ==
- Members of Polish Sejm 2005-2007
