= Szymon Pawłowski (politician) =

Polish politician

member of Sejm 2005-2007
- In office 25 September 2005 – 2007

Personal details
- Born: 5 December 1978 (age 47)
- Party: League of Polish Families

Szymon Jerzy Pawłowski (born 5 December 1978 in Sanok) is a Polish politician. He was elected to the Sejm on 25 September 2005, getting 7984 votes in 20 Warsaw district as a candidate from the League of Polish Families list.

== See also ==
- Members of Polish Sejm 2005-2007
