= Klewki, Warmian-Masurian Voivodeship =

Klewki
- Village
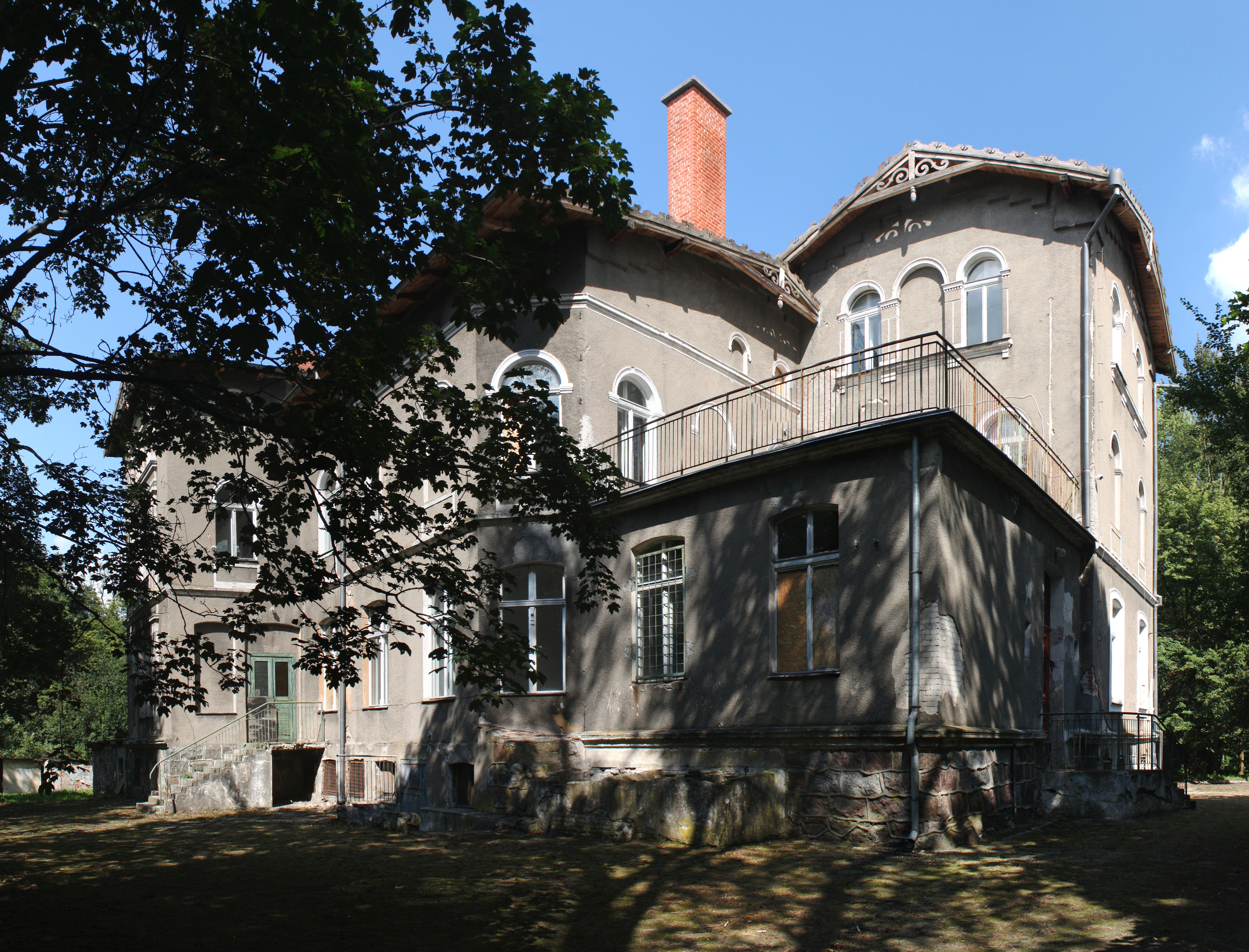
- Historic manor house in Klewki

- Location within Poland
- Coordinates: 53°44′1″N 20°34′56″E
- Country: Poland
- Voivodeship: Warmian-Masurian
- County: Olsztyn
- Gmina: Purda
- Population: 1,500
- Time zone: UTC+1 (CET)
  - Summer (DST): UTC+2 (CEST)
- Area code: +48 89
- Vehicle registration: NOL

Klewki [ˈklɛfkʲi] is a village in the administrative district of Gmina Purda, within Olsztyn County, Warmian-Masurian Voivodeship, in northern Poland. It is located in Warmia.

The historic landmarks of Klewki are the Saints Valentine and Roch church and the old manor house. A railway station is located in the village.
