= Edward Ośko =

Polish politician

member of Sejm 2005-2007
- In office 25 September 2005 – 2007

Personal details
- Born: 13 January 1957 (age 69)
- Party: League of Polish Families

Edward Ośko (born 13 January 1957 in Podebłocie) is a Polish politician. He was elected to the Sejm on 25 September 2005, getting 5725 votes in 35 Olsztyn district as a candidate from the League of Polish Families list.

== See also ==
- Members of Polish Sejm 2005-2007
