= Aleksander Chłopek =

Polish politician (born 1946)

member of Sejm 2005-2007
- Incumbent
- Assumed office 25 September 2005

Personal details
- Born: 1946 (age 79–80)
- Party: Law and Justice

Aleksander Antoni Chłopek (born 13 December 1946 in Chrzanów) is a Polish politician. He was elected to Sejm on 25 September 2005, getting 5366 votes in 29 Gliwice district as a candidate from the Law and Justice list.

From 1978 to 1981 he was a member of the Polish United Workers' Party.

== See also ==
- Members of Polish Sejm 2005-2007
