= Joanna Marszałek-Kawa =

Polish lawyer and political scientist

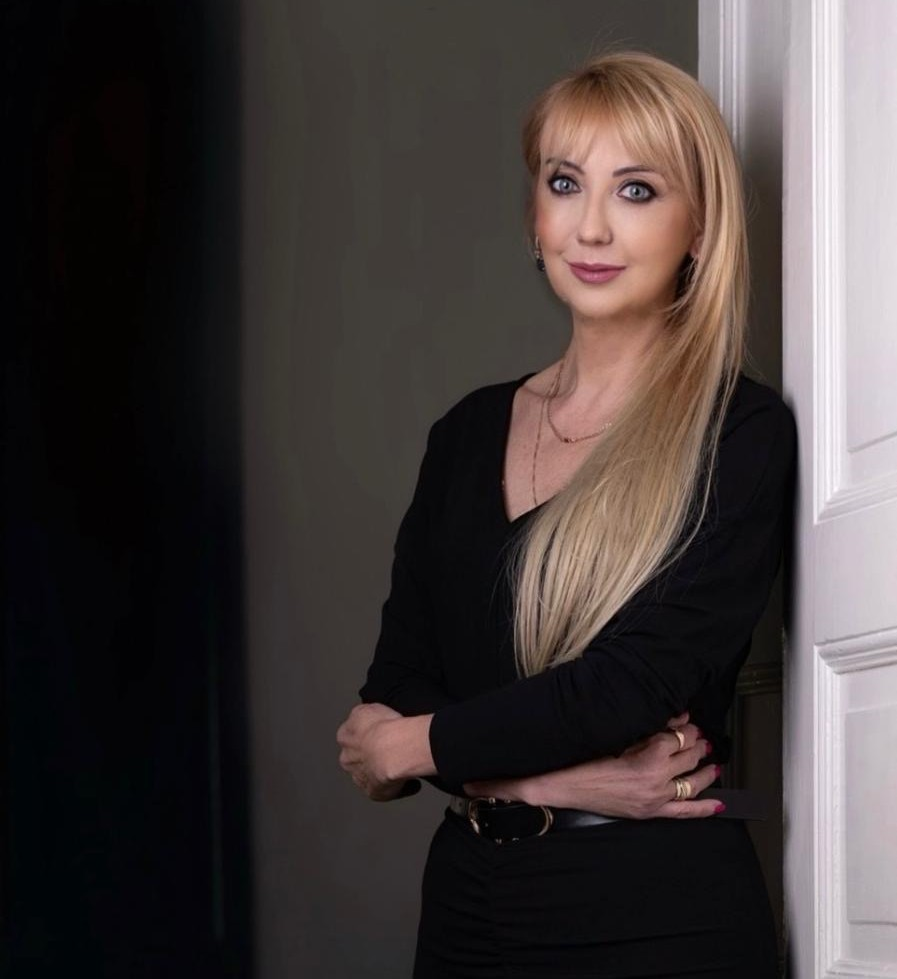
Joanna Marszałek-Kawa

Joanna Marszałek-Kawa is a Polish lawyer, political scientist, professor and lecturer at the Faculty of Political Science of Nicolaus Copernicus University in Toruń.

== Biography ==
Joanna Marszałek-Kawa is the Head of the Department of the Political System of the Republic of Poland at the Faculty of Political Science and International Studies at Nicolaus Copernicus University in Toruń. She is also the Director of the Centre of Eastern Studies and the Vice President of Toruń branch of the Polish Association of Political Science. Marszałek-Kawa is the editor-in-chief of the journals: Polish Political Science Yearbook and New Eastern Policy(quarterly), published jointly with Al-Farabi Kazakh National University in Almaty. She is the deputy editor-in-chief of Athenaeum. Polish Political Science Studies (quarterly), and the secretary of The New Educational Review (quarterly). She is also a member of the scientific boards of the following journals: lmi əsərlər [Scientific Works] issued by Baku Slavic University in Azerbaijan; the Journal of Precarpathian National University Politology (Ivano-Frankivsk, Ukraine) and Gdańskie Studia Azji Wschodniej [Gdansk Journal of East Asian Studies]. She is the author of more than 420 scientific publications, including 10 monographs in Polish (among others, "Pozycja ustrojowa i funkcje Sejmu Rzeczypospolitej Polskiej po akcesji do Unii Europejskiej", "Organizacja I funkcjonowanie Zgromadzenia Republiki w Portugalii", "Struktura i funkcjonowanie Parlamentu Europejskiego". (In English Contemporary China. The Condition of the State) and Chinese (欧洲议会与欧盟各国国家议会–The European Parliament and National Parliaments in European Union Member States, 加入欧盟后波兰豅会的地位和作用 - The Position and Role of the Polish Society after the Accession to the European Union). She is also a co-author of two books published by Cambridge Scholar Publishing—The Politics of Memory in Post-Authoritarian Transitions. Case Studies, Vol. 1 and The Politics of Memory in Post-Authoritarian Transitions. Comparative Analysis, Vol. 2.

Her research interests include the European Parliament, Asian issues, political systems, and the constitutional systems of countries in the world. For her scientific and organizational achievements, she was awarded eight times by H.M. Rector of Nicolaus Copernicus University. Her PhD thesis, "The European Parliament vs. National Parliaments in the European Union Member States", was recognized as the best doctoral dissertation in the field of political science in Poland in 2004. She has participated with speeches in numerous Polish and international conferences and scientific congresses. She is the inventor and academic coordinator of Asian international conferences and congresses held for over 11 years under the auspices of the Minister of Foreign Affairs and the Minister of Science and Higher Education. They are considered to be among the most important events of their kind in Europe. She is the scholar of Polish Historical Mission at Julius Maximilian University of Würzburg in Würzburg, Germany, August 2015 and August 2018. She has been an intern and a visiting professor of the following universities: Kyrgyz-Russian Slavic University in Bishkek, Baku Slavic University (Azerbaijan), Al-Farabi Kazakh National University in Almaty (Kazakhstan), Grigol Robakidze University (Georgia), Pavol Safarik University (Slovakia), Gori State Teaching University (Georgia). In 2012–2016, she was the manager of the research project "Memory as an element of shaping a new identity during the transition from an authoritarian system" (sign. NCN - 2012/05/E/HS5/02722). In August 2017, she received the 11th Special Book Award of China for Young Scholars (awarded by State Administration of Press, Publishing, Radio, Film, and Television to foreign writers, scientists, translators and publishers).

== Education ==
Marszałek-Kawa attended the Faculty of Law and Administration at Nicolaus Copernicus University from 1994 to 1999, where she obtained a master's degree in law. In 2004, she received a PhD in the political science field in humanities. In 2012, she was awarded a post-doctoral degree in political science. She became an associate professor in NCU in 2015.

== Research project ==
- Participation in the Polish-Swiss research project carried out on the 50th anniversary of the Neutral Nations Supervisory Commission—the programme implemented with the help of the Ministry of Foreign Affairs (Department of Promotion, Asia-Pacific Department), the Embassy of the Republic of Poland in Bern and the Ministry of National Defence (Social Affairs Department). The project was completed in July 2003 (the final materials were published in February 2004). Its managers were Marceli Burdelski, PhD, from the University of Gdańsk and Col. PhD Eng. Eugeniusz Jendraszczak.
- Scientific director of the research project titled "Politics of Memory as an Element of the Development of a New Identity in the Process of Transition from the Authoritarian System" (ref. no. NCN - 2012/05/E/HS5/02722
- Manager of the grant project of the Ministry of Science and Higher Education within the framework of DUN (science dissemination activities), entitled "Jak Jedwabny Szlak zmienia świat" ("How the Silk Road Changes the World") (decision of the Ministry of Science and Higher Education no. 952/P-DUN/2017 of 13 June 2017), no. 819/PSM/1/DUN.
- Manager of the grant project of the Ministry of Science and Higher Education within the framework of DUN (science dissemination activities), entitled "Kierunek Azja. Różnorodność, odmienność, dialog" ("Heading for Asia. Diversity, Otherness, Dialogue") (decision of the Ministry of Science and Higher Education no. 773/P-DUN/2018 of 6 May 2018).
- Scientific director of the research project entitled "Youths and Politics", Professor Czesław Mojsiewicz's International Cooperation Support Fund, 2018–2021
- Managing director of the research project entitled "Podstawowa kategoryzacja politologiczna" ( Basic Categorization in Political Science), Professor Czesław Mojsiewicz's International Cooperation Support Fund
