= Janusz Dobrosz =

Polish politician

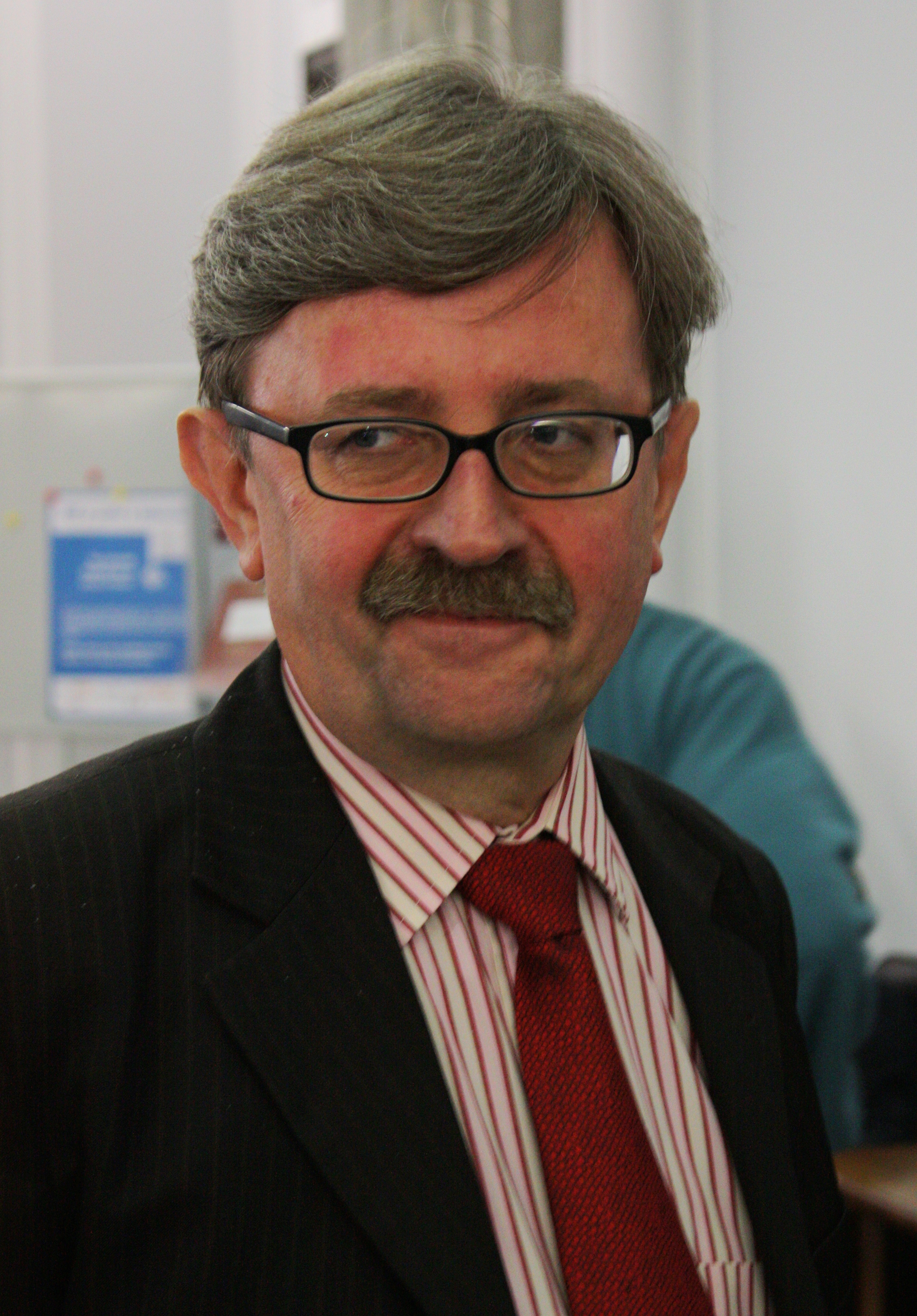

Member of the Sejm
- In office 19 September 1993 – 4 November 2007
- In office 18 June 1989 – 24 November 1991

Personal details
- Born: 1954 (age 71–72)
- Party: League of Polish Families

Janusz Konrad Dobrosz ([ˈjanuʂ ˈdɔbrɔʂ], born 7 March 1954 in Wieruszów) is a Polish politician. He was elected to the Sejm on 25 September 2005, getting 14,655 votes in 3 Wrocław district as a candidate from the League of Polish Families list.

He was also a member of People's Republic of Poland Sejm 1989-1991, Sejm 1993-1997, Sejm 1997-2001, and Sejm 2001-2005.

== See also ==
- Members of Polish Sejm 2005-2007
