= Andrzej Łuczak =

Polish chess player (born 1948)

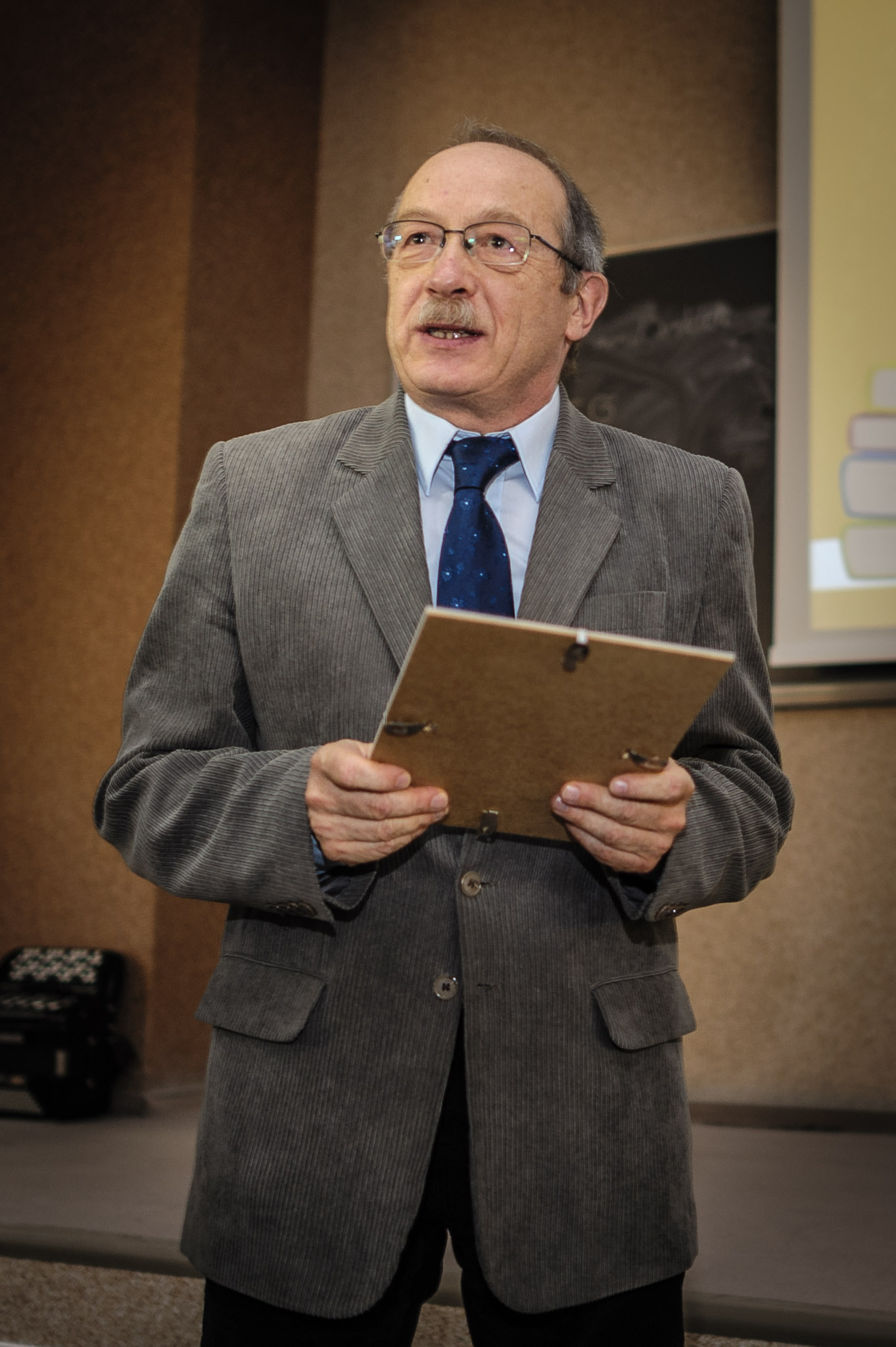
- Andrzej Łuczak in 2014

Personal information
- Born: 5 December 1948 (age 77) Łódź, Poland

Chess career
- Country: Poland
- Title: International Master (1979)
- Peak rating: 2440 (January 1979)

Andrzej Łuczak (born 5 December 1948) is a Polish chess International Master (1979) and scientist (mathematician).

== Chess career ==
In 1967, Andrzej Łuczak won a silver medal in Wisła in the Polish Junior Chess Championship in U20 age group. Twice (in 1977 and 1979) he played in Swiss-system tournament finals of Polish Chess Championship, without achieving significant successes. In 1981, Andrzej Łuczak won a silver medal in Bydgoszcz in Polish Blitz Chess Championship

Andrzej Łuczak won four medals in Polish Team Chess Championships (all in the colors of the chess club Start Łódź): gold (Kraków 1965), two silver (Wisła 1963, Warsaw 1966) and bronze (Częstochowa 1964). He was also a three-time medalist of the Polish Blitz Chess Team Championships: gold in the colors of chess club Start (Poznań] 1970) and twice in the colors of chess club Anilana Łódź – gold (Bydgoszcz 1987) and silver (Katowice 1988).

In 1975 Andrzej Łuczak won the open tournament in Warsaw. In 1978, he took 3rd place in the Kazimierz Makarczyk memorial played in Łódź. A year later, Andrzej Łuczak performed in Akiba Rubinstein Memorial in Polanica-Zdrój. In 1981, he took 3rd place in Nałęczów. In 1984, Andrzej Łuczak again took 3rd place in the Kazimierz Makarczyk memorial in Łódź.

Andrzej Łuczak reached the highest rating in his career on 1 January 1979, with a score of 2440 points, he was ranked 2nd (behind Adam Kuligowski) among Polish chess players. He has not participated in FIDE tournaments since 1994.

== Scientific career ==
Andrzej Łuczak is a mathematician, since 2012 a habilitated professor (specialty: probability theory). He works in the Department of Probability Theory and Statistics at Faculty of Mathematics and Computer Science in University of Łódź. He is also a Mathematics Genealogy Project 4th degree of Stefan Banach.
