= Fiedor =

Fiedor is a Polish surname. Notable people with the surname include:

- Andrzej Fiedor (1946–2025), Polish biathlete
- Bogusław Fiedor (born 1946), Polish economist
- Erwin Fiedor (1943–2012), Polish ski jumper and Nordic combined skier
- Karol Fiedor (architect) (born 1968), Polish architect
- Karol Fiedor (historian) (1927–2010), Polish historian
- Marek Fiedor (born 1962), Polish theatre director
- Wanda Gugnacka-Fiedor (1945–2019), Polish scholar and biologist
- Wiesław Fiedor (born 1964), Polish disabled skier and Paralympic gold medallist
