= Jerzy Luczak-Szewczyk =

Polish-born Swedish artist (1923–1975)

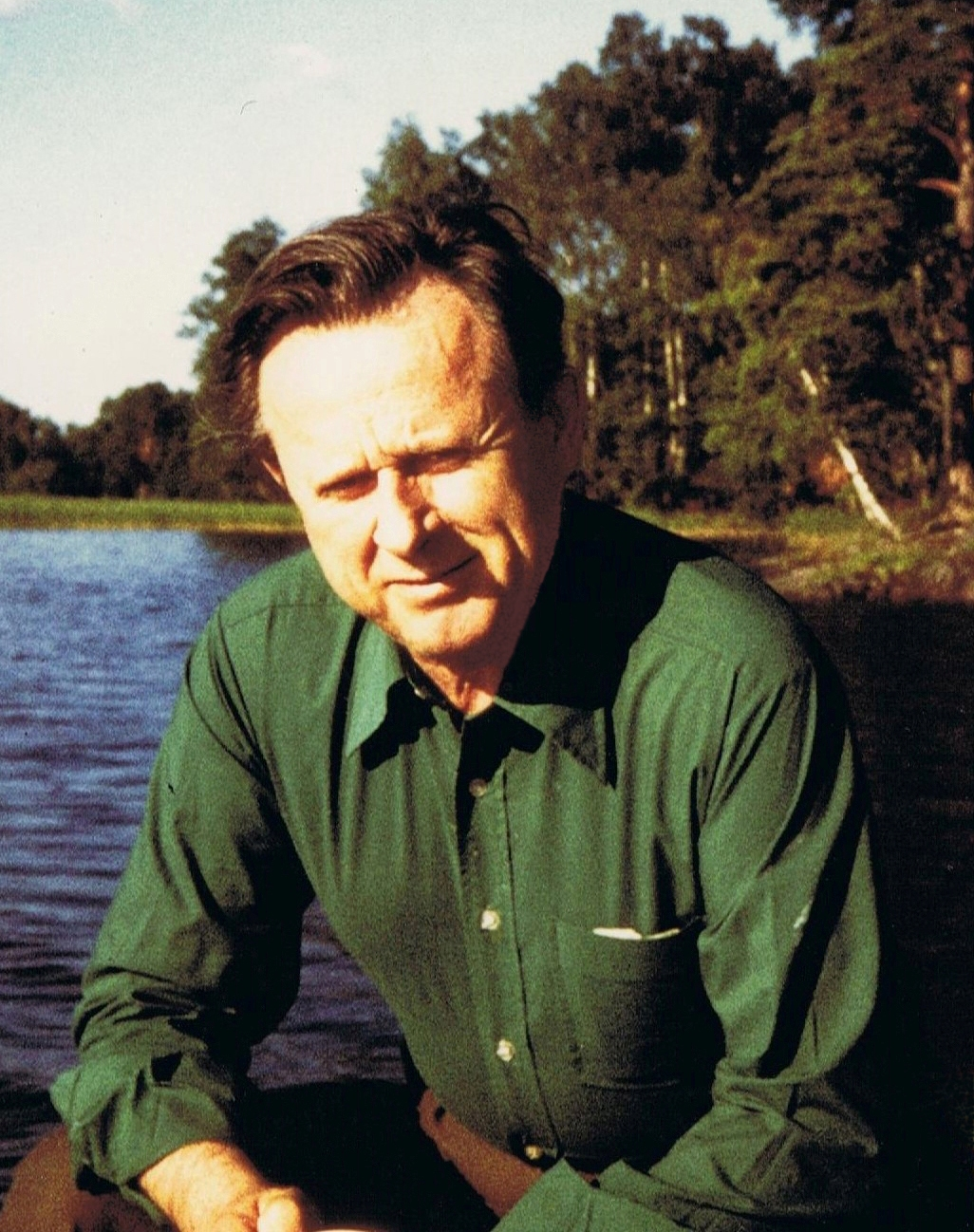
- Jerzy Luczak-Szewczyk, 1974
- Born: Wojciech Stanisław Szewczyk; 2 January 1923; Lublin, Poland
- Died: 12 April 1975 (aged 52); Örebro, Sweden
- Occupations: Painter, drawer, sculptor
- Spouse: Inga Johansson (m. 1950)

Jerzy Luczak-Szewczyk (born Wojciech Stanisław Szewczyk, 2 January 1923 - 12 April 1975, Örebro, Sweden) was a Polish-born Swedish painter, drawer and sculptor.

== Biography ==
Wojciech Stanisław Szewczyk was born in Lublin, Poland and lived there during his childhood together with his mother Wincentyna (née Skośkiewicz), his father Franciszek Szewczyk and his sister Janina. Already as a child he was interested in painting and when the family in the late 1920s moved to the outskirts of Warsaw, he became acquainted with an established artist who taught him different techniques. During his teens he began studies in art at schools in Warsaw. However, after the German invasion of Poland in September 1939, he had to end his education as German authorities took him to do forced labour in the spring of 1940.

=== The refugee ===
Luczak was sent to East Prussia, where he at first was commanded to work at a farm near the town Angerapp (present-day Ozyorsk, Kaliningrad Oblast) and later in a forced labour camp in Allenstein (Olsztyn). In the autumn of 1943 he escaped to Warsaw where a relative hid him. Since he was wanted by German authorities and lived under the threat of execution if he was found, he had to assume a new identity. Through contacts with the Polish Home Army (Polish: Armia Krajowa) he got false documents and the name Jerzy Luczak.

The false identity saved him from being executed when German military later took him again, during a round-up (Polish: Łapanka) in Warsaw. However he was sent to a forced labour camp, this time in Berlin, where he was forced to clear ruins after the Allied bombing raids. After some time he was selected together with about one hundred other prisoners to be sent to a forced labour camp in northern Norway. The group of prisoners was transported by boat via Stettin in Germany to Oslo in Norway. At the arrival Luczak escaped once more. He by coincidence met a man who contacted the Norwegian resistance movement. They helped him across the border to Sweden on the night between the 8 and 9 March 1944.

When Jerzy Luczak-Szewczyk arrived in Sweden, the immigration authorities sent him to Örebro (a town situated in the middle of the country) where he got a job in a photographers company. At the same time he began his career as a professional artist, but during the first years in Sweden he could not get documents from Poland to certify his true identity. Therefore, he used his false name Jerzy Luczak as his artist name. Even after he had been granted a Swedish citizenship under his real birth name in 1954, he continued to sign his works J. Luczak. It was not until the mid-1960s that he began to sign with both surnames. In 1950 Jerzy Luczak-Szewczyk married Swedish-born Inga Johansson in Örebro.

=== Career and exhibitions ===
Jerzy Luczak-Szewczyk worked mainly in oil painting, but he also used other media, such as drawing, stucco, sculpture and mosaic. Between his first Swedish exhibition in 1946 in Eskilstuna and his last in 1962 in Örebro, he had several exhibitions of his own and participated in group exhibitions. During the 1950s he also carried out decorations on public and private owned buildings, especially mural paintings and reliefs.

In the beginning of his career, Luczak's subjects were illustrations of his memories from the war, still lifes, portraits and landscapes. His paintings varied in quality, but he continued to work and to develop his skills. The paintings from the 1950s, especially his city scenes and landscapes, show that he gradually went from a style inspired by Cézanne, to an increasingly freer and personal way of expression.

Luczak's travels in Europe in the early 1960s, led to a radical change in his style. Instead of using brushes and palette knives, he started to paint with his hands on the canvas. Initially the subjects still were figurative compositions but from the middle of the decade he created surrealistic, expressive images of dramatic landscapes, populated by fantasy figures, fish and animals. The paintings were large, performed in a personal impasto technique and often in darkish colour tones.

During his travels in Europe Luczak visited museums and art galleries. He also introduced himself to gallery owners. An exhibition at the Galerie Bernheim-Jeune in Paris in 1965 led to positive reviews both in French and Swedish newspapers. This resulted in further exhibitions for example in Paris (Galerie Mouffe 1970), Biarritz (Galerie Vallombreuse 1970), New York City (Galerie Internationale 1970) and in London (B. H. Corner Gallery 1971).

Jerzy Luczak-Szewczyk died 12 April 1975 in Örebro, Sweden. In 1970 he was appointed honorary member with silver medal of the Accademia Internazionale Tommaso Campanella in Rome. He is represented in Swedish private and public collections and in private collections in France, Belgium, the United Kingdom, the United States and Australia.

== Additional literature ==
- Bugatti, C. E. (1969) Guida all'arte Europea. Ancona, Italy: p. XXXIII and p. 83. (A dictionary of artists.)
- Fourny, M. (1970) Annuaire de l'art international 1970-1971. Paris, France: p. 464. (A directory of artists and galleries.)
- Lo Faro Editore, V. (1970) Traguardi dell'arte '70. Rome, Italy: vol. I, p. 284. (A dictionary of artists.)
- Palmaer Waldén, M., Waldén K. (1965) Örebro i konsten. Örebro, Sweden. Drätselkammarens kansli. Unnumbered page.(The book concerns the town of Örebro as it has been presented in art.)
- Rauschenbusch, H., ed. (1967,1969) International directory of arts. Berlin, Germany: Deutsche Zentraldrûckerei AG. 9th edition 1967: vol. 1, p. 745. 10th edition 1969: vol. 1, p. 824.

== Selected Swedish newspaper articles and reviews of exhibitions ==
- Ahlin, J. (16 October 2015) "Konstnär med spännande historia". Mariestads tidning. Mariestad, Sweden. (Article about five reliefs executed by the artist in 1956 in Mariestad.)
- C.S. (16 April 1947) "Polsk målare ställer ut på Mollberg". Skånska Socialdemokraten. Hälsingborg, Sweden. (Review of one-man exhibition in Hälsingborg)
- Fr. (16 November 1954) "Polsksvensk konstnär utställer i Bollnäs". Hälsinge-Kuriren. Bollnäs, Sweden. (Review of one-man exhibition in Bollnäs.)
- G. H-d. (3 March 1948) "En polsk målare". Borås Tidning. Borås, Sweden (Review of one-man exhibition in Borås.)
- G. (12 March 1949) "Polsk målare på Klostret". Arbetet. Malmö, Sweden. (Review of one-man exhibition in Lund.)
- JoJo. (21 March 1955) "Intressant utställning i Säbysalen". Tranåsposten. Tranås, Sweden. (Review of one-man exhibition in Tranås.)
- Lindén, G. (28 December 1965) "30.000 kronor gav fin utdelning". Nerikes Allehanda. Örebro, Sweden. (Article about the one-man exhibition in Paris 1965.)
- Särnstedt, B. (9 November 1954) "Jersey Luczak". Östgöta Correspondenten. Linköping, Sweden. (Review of one-man exhibition in Motala.)
- "Örebrokonstnär hemma igen efter lyckad amerikasejour Nu väntar London och Paris". (21 December 1970) Örebro Kuriren. Örebro, Sweden. (Article about the one-man exhibition in New York 1970.)
