= Przemysław Andrejuk =

Polish politician

Deputy of the V Sejm
- In office 2005 – 2007
- Constituency: 7 Chełm

Personal details
- Born: 9 February 1977 (age 48) Kodeń, Polish People's Republic
- Party: League of Polish Families

Przemysław Andrejuk (born 9 February 1977 in Kodeń) is a Polish politician. He was elected to the Sejm on 25 September 2005 with 7,000 votes in 7 Chełm district, as a candidate for the League of Polish Families list.

== See also ==
- List of Sejm members (2005–2007)
