= Arnold Masin =

Polish politician

member of Sejm 2005-2007
- In office 25 September 2005 – 2007

Personal details
- Born: 6 April 1977 (age 49) Staszów
- Party: League of Polish Families

Arnold Wiktor Masin (born 6 April 1977) is a Polish politician. He was elected to the Sejm on 25 September 2005, getting 4168 votes in 10 Piotrków Trybunalski district as a candidate from the League of Polish Families list. He was a Vice-Minister of Sport in the Cabinet of Jarosław Kaczyński.

== See also ==
- Members of Polish Sejm 2005-2007
