= Elżbieta Ratajczak =

Polish politician (born 1946)

member of Sejm 2005-2007
- In office 25 September 2005 – 2007

Personal details
- Born: 14 August 1946 (age 79)
- Party: League of Polish Families

Elżbieta Teresa Ratajczak (born 14 August 1946 in Leszno) is a Polish politician. She was elected to the Sejm on 25 September 2005, getting 8342 votes in 36 Kalisz district as a candidate from the League of Polish Families list.

She was also a member of Sejm 2001-2005.

== See also ==
- Members of Polish Sejm 2005-2007
