= Rajmund Bergel =

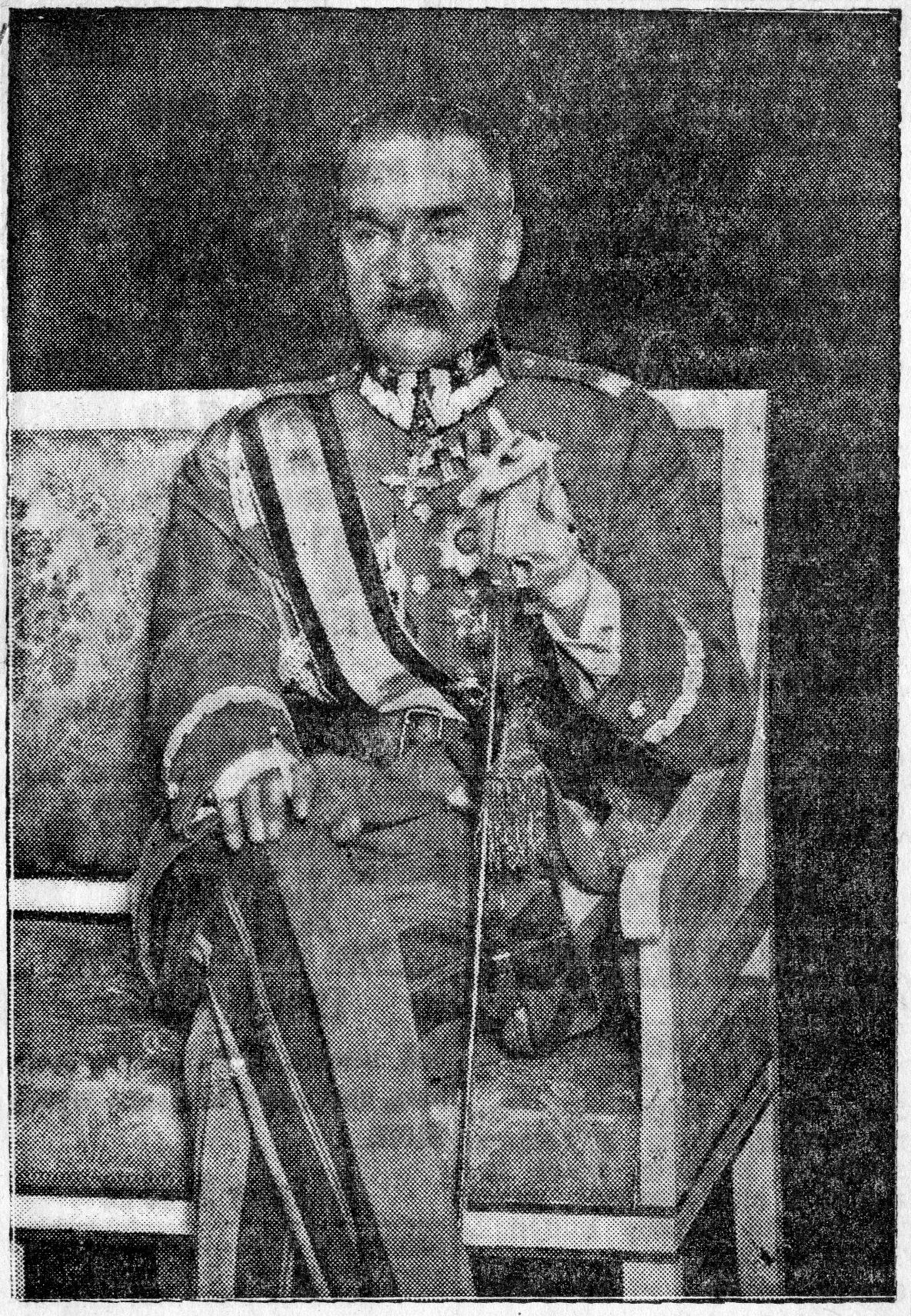

Rajmund Michał Bergel (1894-1937) was a Polish poet, literary critic, playwright, and infantry captain in the Polish Army.
