= Stanisław Łyżwiński =

Polish politician

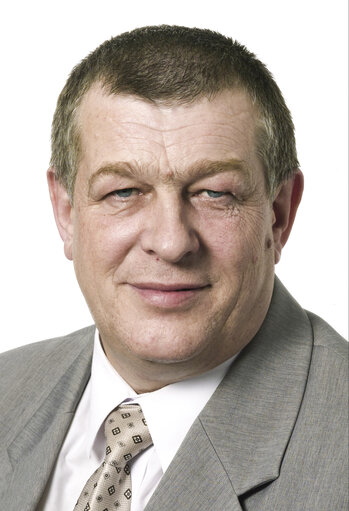
- Łyżwiński in 2004

Member of Sejm 2005-2007
- In office 25 September 2005 – 2007

Personal details
- Born: 6 May 1954 (age 72) Skaryszew
- Party: Samoobrona RP
- Spouse: Wanda Łyżwińska
- Children: 2

Stanisław Józef Łyżwiński (born 6 May 1954 in Skaryszew) is a Polish former politician. He was elected to Sejm on 25 September 2005, getting 21,101 votes in 10 Piotrków Trybunalski district as a candidate from Self-Defence of the Republic of Poland (SRP) list.

He was also a Member of Sejm from 2001 to 2005.

Following a "sex affair", Łyżwiński was convicted of rape and sentenced to five years in prison.

== See also ==
- Members of Polish Sejm 2005 to 2007
