= Mieczysław Marcin Łuczak =

Polish politician

member of Sejm 2005-2007
- In office 25 September 2005 – 2015

Personal details
- Born: 1955 (age 70–71)
- Party: Polish People's Party

Mieczysław Marcin Łuczak (born 9 July 1955 in Wieluń) is a Polish politician. He was elected to Sejm on 25 September 2005, getting 6,105 votes in 11 Sieradz district as a candidate from the Polish People's Party list.

== See also ==
- Members of Polish Sejm 2005-2007
