= Marek Kotlinowski =

Polish politician and lawyer

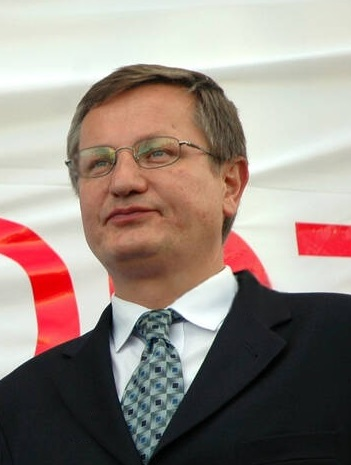

Vice-Marshal of The Sejm
- In office 25 September 2005 – 27 October 2006

Judge of the Constitutional Tribunal
- In office 6 November 2006 – 6 November 2015

Personal details
- Born: 1956 (age 69–70)
- Party: League of Polish Families

Marek Bolesław Kotlinowski (['marɛk kɔtliˈnɔfski], born 13 May 1956 in Gorlice) is a Polish politician and lawyer, Vice-Marshal of the Sejm. He was elected to the Sejm on 25 September 2005, getting 9,421 votes in 13 Kraków district as a candidate from the League of Polish Families list. From 6 November 2006 to 6 November 2015 he was a judge of the Polish Constitutional Tribunal.

He was also a member of Sejm 2001-2005.

== See also ==
- Members of Polish Sejm 2005-2007
