= Stanisław Zadora =

Polish politician

member of Sejm 2005-2007
- In office 25 September 2005 – 2007

Personal details
- Born: 1949 (age 76–77)
- Party: League of Polish Families

Stanisław Zadora (born 3 October 1949 in Witoszów) is a Polish politician. He was elected to the Sejm on 25 September 2005, getting 6463 votes in 27 Bielsko-Biała district as a candidate from the League of Polish Families list.

He was also a member of Sejm 2001-2005.

== See also ==
- Members of Polish Sejm 2005-2007
