= Andrzej Fedorowicz (politician) =

Polish politician (born 1950)

member of Sejm 2005-2007
- Incumbent
- Assumed office 25 September 2005

Personal details
- Born: 1950 (age 75–76) Łomża, Poland
- Party: League of Polish Families

Andrzej Fedorowicz (born 30 December 1950) is a Polish politician. He was elected to the Sejm on 25 September 2005, getting 12,752 votes in 24 Białystok district as a candidate from the League of Polish Families list.

He was also a member of Sejm 2001-2005.

== See also ==
- Members of Polish Sejm 2005-2007
