= Marek Kawa =

Polish politician

member of Sejm 2005-2007
- In office 25 September 2005 – ?

Personal details
- Born: 1975 (age 50–51)
- Party: League of Polish Families

Marek Kawa (born 22 July 1975 in Opole) is a Polish politician. He was elected to the Sejm on 25 September 2005, getting 6346 votes in 21 Opole district as a candidate from the League of Polish Families list.

== See also ==
- Members of Polish Sejm 2005-2007
