= Jan Jarota =

Polish politician (born 1953)

member of Sejm 2005-2007
- In office 25 September 2005 – 4 November 2007

Personal details
- Born: 1953 (age 72–73)
- Party: League of Polish Families

Jan Jarota (born 9 December 1953 in Łomża) is a Polish politician. He was elected to the Sejm on 25 September 2005, getting 3763 votes in 24 Białystok district as a candidate from the League of Polish Families list.

== See also ==
- Members of Polish Sejm 2005-2007
