= Ewa Sowińska =

Polish politician (born 1944)

Member of Sejm 2005–2006
- In office 25 September 2005 – 2006

Children's ombudsman, Poland
- In office 2006–2008
- Preceded by: Paweł Jaros
- Succeeded by: Marek Michalak

Personal details
- Born: 5 March 1944 (age 82)
- Party: League of Polish Families

Ewa Barbara Sowińska (Polish pronunciation: [ˈɛva sɔˈvʲiɲska], born 5 March 1944 in Bydgoszcz) is a Polish politician.

== Political career ==
She was elected to the Sejm on 25 September 2005, getting 8536 votes in 9 Łódź district, on the League of Polish Families party list.

She became Ombudsman for Children in 2006. On 22 April 2008 she resigned from the position, effective 30 June 2008.

She was also a member of the Sejm 2001–2005. She was trained in internal medicine at the Medical University of Białystok.

== Views ==
In the past, she has suggested that homosexuals should be banned from certain professions and forced to register with the government, that unmarried cohabiting couples be required to register with the state, and planned to order an investigation for supposed homosexuality in the British children's television series Teletubbies.

== See also ==
- Members of Polish Sejm 2005-2007
