= Marzena Paduch =

Polish politician (born 1965)

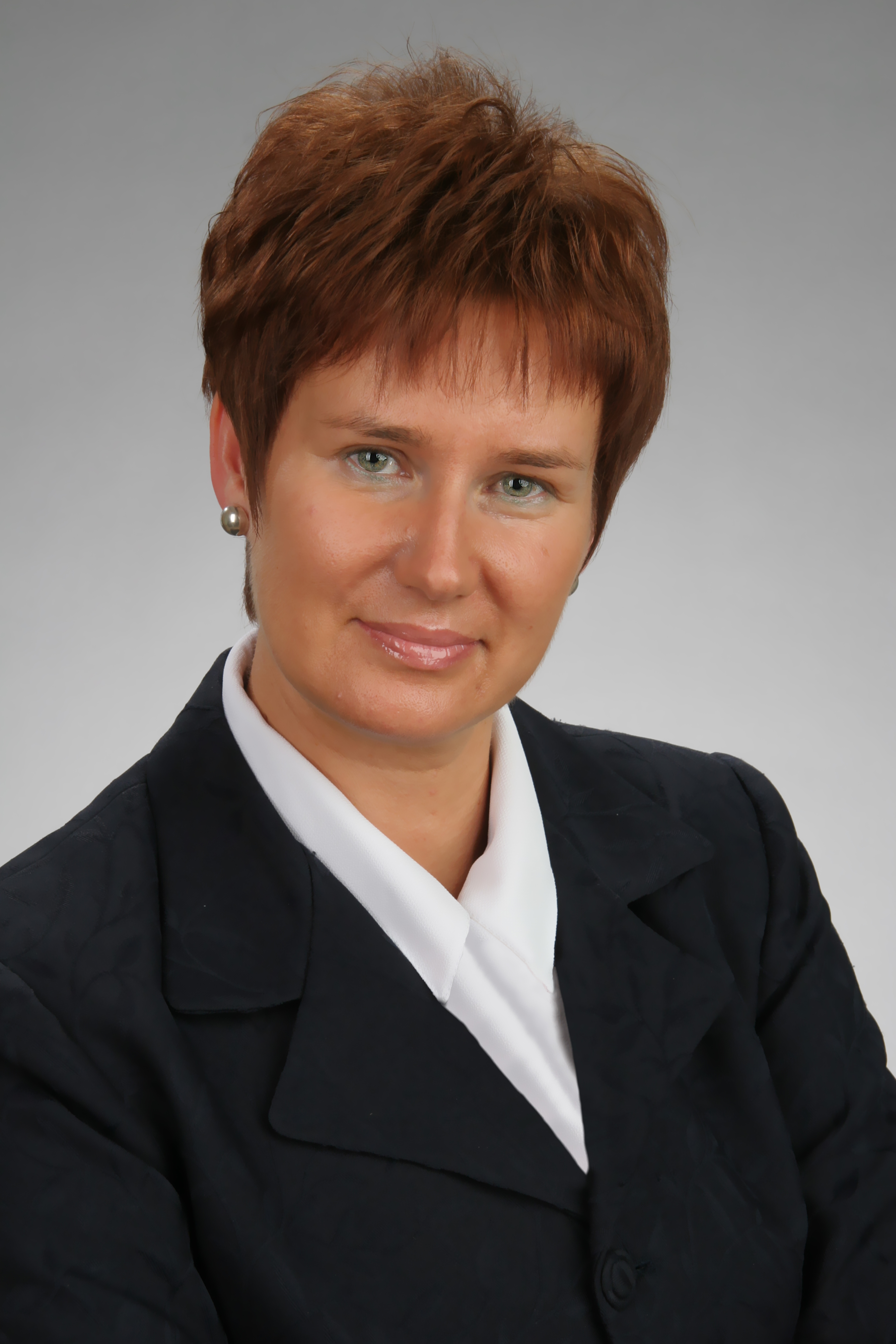
- Marzena Paduch in 2005

member of Sejm 2005-2007
- In office 25 September 2005 – 2007

Personal details
- Born: 7 April 1965 (age 61)
- Party: Samoobrona

Marzena Hanna Paduch (born 7 April 1965 in Zwoleń) is a Polish politician. She was elected to Sejm on 25 September 2005, getting 7,838 votes in 17 Radom district as a candidate from Samoobrona Rzeczpospolitej Polskiej list.

== See also ==
- Members of Polish Sejm 2005-2007
