= List of Democratic Left Alliance politicians =

A list of notable Polish politicians of the Democratic Left Alliance party (Polish: Sojusz Lewicy Demokratycznej).

== A ==
- Waldemar Achramowicz
- Bartosz Arłukowicz

== B ==
- Marek Belka
- Robert Biedroń
- Barbara Blida
- Marek Borowski
- Anita Błochowiak

== C ==
- Andrzej Celiński
- Kazimierz Chrzanowski
- Grażyna Ciemniak
- Bronisław Cieślak
- Włodzimierz Cimoszewicz
- Eugeniusz Czykwin

== D ==
- Jolanta Danielak

== G ==
- Piotr Gadzinowski
- Tomasz Garbowski
- Lidia Geringer d'Oedenberg
- Witold Gintowt-Dziewałtowski
- Bogdan Golik
- Henryk Gołębiewski
- Genowefa Grabowska

== H ==
- Jerzy Hausner

== I ==
- Tadeusz Iwiński

== J ==
- Ewa Janik
- Krzysztof Janik
- Elżbieta Jankowska
- Stanisław Jarmoliński
- Sławomir Jeneralski
- Wiesław Jędrusik

== K ==
- Anna Kalata
- Ryszard Kalisz
- Romuald Kosieniak
- Janusz Krasoń
- Aleksander Krawczuk
- Janusz Kubicki
- Jerzy Kulej
- Grzegorz Kurczuk
- Aleksander Kwaśniewski

== L ==
- Grzegorz Lato
- Sandra Lewandowska
- Bogusław Liberadzki
- Krystian Łuczak
- Krystyna Łybacka

== M ==
- Jacek Majchrowski
- Janusz Maksymiuk
- Stanisław Maliszewski
- Krzysztof Martens
- Wacław Martyniuk
- Krzysztof Matyjaszczyk
- Henryk Milcarz
- Leszek Miller
- Tadeusz Motowidło

== N ==
- Grzegorz Napieralski
- Tomasz Nałęcz

== O ==
- Wojciech Olejniczak
- Józef Oleksy
- Artur Ostrowski

== P ==
- Jerzy Passendorfer
- Longin Pastusiak
- Sylwester Pawłowski
- Wojciech Pawłowski
- Jacek Piechota
- Katarzyna Piekarska
- Stanisław Piosik
- Zbigniew Podraza
- Wojciech Pomajda
- Stanisława Prządka

== R ==
- Mieczysław Rakowski
- Dariusz Rosati
- Stanisław Rydzoń

== S ==
- Joanna Senyszyn
- Zbigniew Siemiątkowski
- Izabella Sierakowska
- Marek Siwiec
- Szczepan Skomra
- Stanisław Stec
- Marek Strzaliński
- Władysław Stępień
- Włodzimierz Stępień
- Wiesław Szczepański
- Andrzej Szejna
- Jerzy Szmajdziński
- Jan Szwarc
- Jolanta Szymanek-Deresz
- Lech Szymańczyk
- Maria Szyszkowska

== T ==
- Michał Tober
- Tadeusz Tomaszewski
- Ryszard Tomczyk

== U ==
- Jerzy Urban

== W ==
- Jerzy Wenderlich
- Jerzy Wiatr
- Marek Wikiński
- Zenon Wiśniewski
- Bogusław Wontor
- Grzegorz Woźny
- Stanisław Wziątek
- Janusz Wójcik

== Z ==
- Zbyszek Zaborowski
- Michał Zaleski
- Ryszard Zbrzyzny
- Janusz Zemke
- Zbigniew Zychowicz
