= Environmental racism in Central and Eastern Europe =

Environmental racism in Central and Eastern Europe is well documented. In Central and Eastern Europe, socialist governments have generally prioritized industrial development over environmental protection, in spite of growing public and governmental environmental awareness in the 1960s and 1970s. Even though public concern over the environmental effects of industrial expansion such as mine and dam construction grew in the late 1980s and early 1990s, policy makers continued to focus on privatization and economic development. Following the market transition, environmental issues have persisted, despite some improvements during the early stages of transition. Throughout this time, significant social restructuring took place alongside environmental changes.

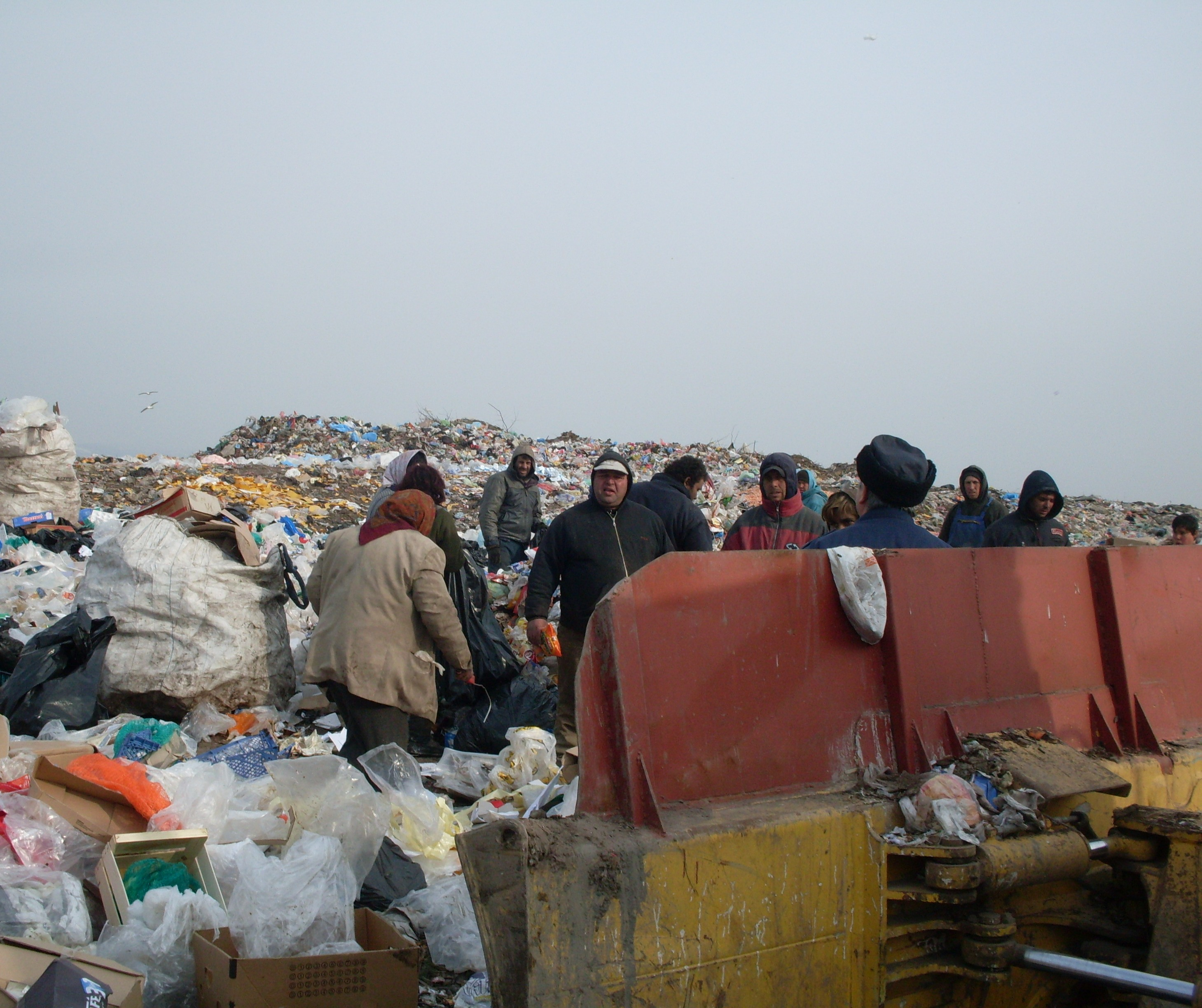
Romani workers at Yambol Landfill, Bulgaria.

According to K. Harper et al., "in the case of Roma in CEE [Central and Eastern Europe], spaces inhabited by low-income Roma have come to be 'racialized' during the post-socialist era, intensifying patterns of environmental exclusion along ethnic lines". Romani peoples have inhabited Central and Eastern Europe for six hundred years and have traditionally worked or been employed as agricultural day laborers, musicians, tinsmiths (tinkers), and blacksmiths. In the words of K. Harper et al.,

The interwar period and the post-socialist period, in their schema, were marked by downward mobility and increased spatial segregation of Roma communities in Hungary, Romania and Bulgaria. It is in the context of these cycles that patterns of environmental exclusion have come into being. More than 50 years after the social dislocations of World War II and the communist regime change, poor Roma settlements throughout the region are located on the outskirts of villages, separated from the majority population by roads, railways or other barriers, and disconnected from water pipelines and sewage treatment.

In analyzing environmental marginalization of Romani communities in Romania, anthropologist Enikő Vincze writes that "Environmental racism functions at the intersection of polluting the natural milieu, and of marginalizing social categories inferiorized by racial identification." Throughout Central and Eastern Europe, Romani people themselves are often treated as environmentally problematic subjects. Slovak authorities have been criticized by Romani rights activists over the alleged practice of "targeting Romani communities for forced evictions under the pretext of environmental law" by defining them as "waste dumps".

In Central Europe, there have been documented cases within popular culture whereupon Romani populations are characterized as ecologically irresponsible. In Slovakia, the region near the transportation corridor between Prešov and Poprad is an important foraging area for Romani communities who collect mushrooms and berries during the summer for trade and direct consumption. The activity is particularly significant due to the poor living conditions of many Romani in the area, who frequently take part in the illegal harvesting of state and private agricultural lands. In 2006, a "popular magazine" published an article titled "Grasshoppers: While Roma from Tatra Region Make Money on Forests, Bears are Getting Hungry". In the article, it was alleged that due to Romani foraging, Slovak bears could not find sufficient food to survive the winter. Similarly, K. Harper et al write that Romani people in Hungary are viewed by majority culture as a group that "lacks environmental awareness" while simultaneously being "dissociated from any timeless connections to land":

Contemporary environmental discourses tend to portray marginalized and indigenous people in either of two ways: as noble savages or as environmental profligates (Krech, 1999). Unlike indigenous people, however, the Roma in Hungary are not associated with a timeless, revered 'environmental ethic'—perhaps because they were excluded from owning land (Csalog, 1994). In fact, the most destitute Roma have been chided for their short-sighted use of environmental resources: heating the house with forest wood and parts of the house itself (Ladányi and Szelényi, 2006 ...), engaging in extremely hazardous scrap metal processing and allegedly overharvesting snowdrop flowers to sell in the city. While many observers acknowledge the structural inequalities and histories underlying Roma communities' rural and post-industrial indigence, the fact remains that non-Roma widely see the Roma as a group that profoundly lacks environmental awareness.

== Lithuania ==
According to a report by RAXEN, overall housing for Romani persons in Lithuania is of poor quality and "often located in disadvantaged places in terms of infrastructure." At the Romani settlement of Kirtimai in Vilnius, RAXEN has documented concerns regarding the quality of access to utilities such as water and heating, stating:

The issue of Roma housing quality is most evident in the Kirtimai settlement, where dwellings do not meet standards in terms of heating, outdoor toilets, water pumps and limited access to public transportation. The Kirtimai settlement was equipped with basic amenities such as water, electricity and waste collection in 2001, and further – perhaps final – developments were carried out in early 2004.

The settlement is located on the outskirts of Vilnius, spatially isolated within an industrial area in close proximity to Vilnius International Airport. An estimated 500 persons inhabit the settlement, which has been described by RAXEN as arguably "ghettoised and discriminated against with regard to housing opportunities". With regards to the nationwide status of utilities access for Lithuanian Romani persons, RAXEN has concluded that "In general, a significant portion of the Roma lives in sub-standard dwellings, and there are Roma families throughout the country who have no access to public utilities (mainly sanitary facilities, water, and electricity)."

== Poland ==
=== Access to water and electricity ===
While Romani settlements in Poland are distributed throughout the country and less segregated than many areas of Central and Eastern Europe, geographical isolation remains a concern with respect to access to means of sustenance. According to a report by RAXEN,

The majority of Roma settlements [in Poland], e.g. in the region of Małopolska are outside other settlements and are deprived of potable water, sewage and roads that allow for ambulance access. The problem also concerns roadblocks to obtaining settlement permits, especially in city centres, which necessarily results in them moving to the outskirts, away from infrastructure that allows for decent living conditions."

According to the study, Romani persons throughout Poland, especially those from the Bergitka subgroup, face ongoing issues with respect to accessing water and utilities, leading to detrimental health conditions and persistently high rates of tuberculosis.

=== Wrocław ===
In 2013, an estimated 80–120 persons of Romanian Romani origin were living in two shantytowns in Wrocław.

The settlements, which had no heated homes, running water, electricity, or sewerage, were constructed using materials salvaged from dumps. These settlements had historical ties to a settlement that existed between 1993 and 1997, when the first Romanian Romani came to Wrocław from the city of Făgăraş in search of employment. Residents at the settlement were employed in scrap metal collection. At the former Kamieńskiego Street shantytown, there was documentation of waste disposal concerns, raw sewage dumping, and burning of plastic causing pollution.

After receiving a municipal order to evacuate the Kamieńskiego Street shantytown in April 2013, residents wrote a letter to the mayor of Wrocław, Rafał Dutkiewicz. The letter reads:

We feel residents of this city [sic]. We have nowhere to move to. Could we count on support and advice on where else we could settle down? We realize that we might be cumbersome neighbors to the inhabitants of Kamieńskiego St., because there are many of us here and we often ask them for help ... If there were any jobs for us, we would gladly take them and dedicate ourselves to the development of and work for the city of Wrocław. What we only ask is, please give us a chance. We want to stay in Wrocław and integrate with the city's society. (Żuchowicz, 2013, p. 2)

Citing begging, trespassing, complaints from neighbors, disturbance to the area, and littering, alongside health and sanitation initiatives previously delivered by the city, the Social Affairs Department rejected residents' requests, concluding that clearing of the site was required. In the words of Jupowiecka, the response letter stated that the Roma presence produced an actual epidemiological hazard, and could no longer be tolerated". According to Kostka in 2014, "In Poland this is an unprecedented case, without jurisprudence, and can potentially have a huge impact on the Polish legal system and the image of Poland across Europe (Nomada 2013)." On July 22, 2015, the Kamieńskiego Street settlement was demolished.

=== Małopolska ===
In the region of Małopolska, there have been documented cases of communities lacking clean drinking water, electricity, and sanitation. These issues have been noted by OSCE observers in the villages of Maszkowice, Jazowsko, Koszary, Krosnica, and Czarna Góra. In Maszkowice and Jazowsko, there have been documented allegations by local residents of theft of garden vegetables and unauthorized wood harvesting by Romani residents.

== Czech Republic ==
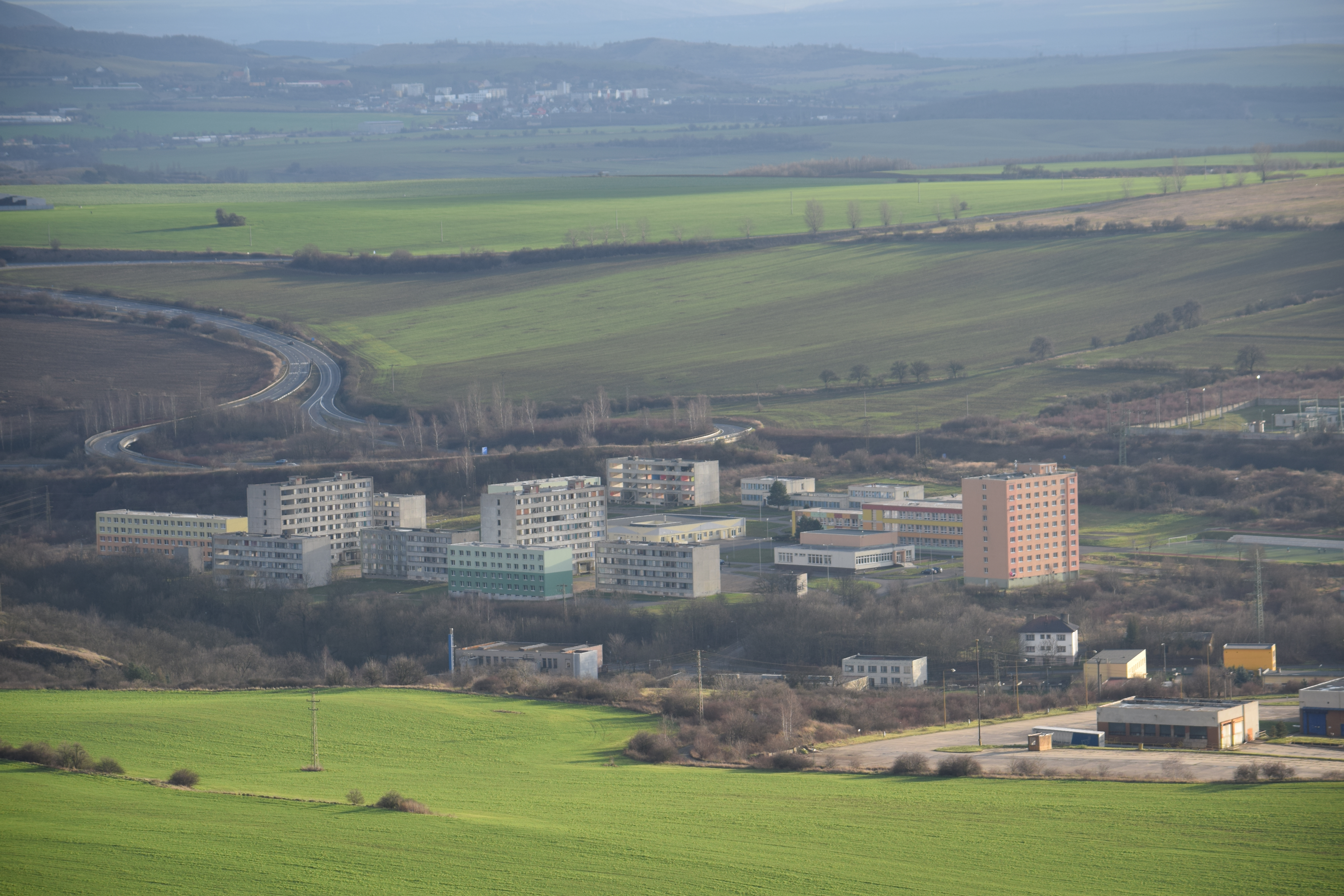
Chanov housing estate on the outskirts of Most, Czech Republic

In Ostrava, Romani communities have been residing in living accommodations situated on top of an abandoned mine where methane gas exposure and subsidence are serious concerns. Ostrava has one of the largest Romani communities in the Czech Republic.

The neighbourhood of Hrušov, also in Ostrava, was formerly a middle class neighbourhood whose residents left between 1950 and 1970 to live in better apartments. In 1980, a highway overpass was built nearby. In 1997, severe flooding took place, following which the area was declared uninhabitable due to the dangers of flooding. Since then, a new housing project, "Coexistence Village" has been facilitated, in which a grassroots movement saw ethnic Czech and Romani communities collaboratively build new houses for themselves together to create desegregated housing.

== Slovakia ==
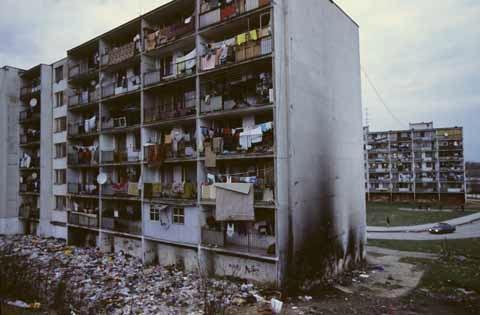
Roma settlement Luník IX in Košice, Eastern Slovakia

In Slovakia, many Romani were settled by the fourteenth century. In 1927, a new Act on Nomadic Roma came into place, whose statutes dictated that nomadic Romani were not to settle in locations of their choosing, but as selected by the mayors of villages.

Following the war, Romani were largely left out of postwar land redistribution schemes. One of the first laws created by the postwar government was the 'Directive on Governing Certain Conditions of Gypsies,' which states that "In villages where they [Roma] have dwellings in proximity to public, state-owned and other roads, the dwellings will be removed, placed separately from the village on distant places selected by the village." The implications of this law was that Romani communities, recently liquidated by the Nazi Holocaust and without resources to purchase land, were now subject to the settlement plans of non-Romani decision-makers.

After initially treating Romani as "non-workers existing 'outside the class system'", socialist governments created policies that led to the rapid integration of Romani communities into the industrial labour force. In spite of official socialist policies of equality, social divisions and social stratification remained. Romani communities experienced poverty emerging from the market transition, as well as significant vulnerability to environmental issues and harms associated with industrialization.

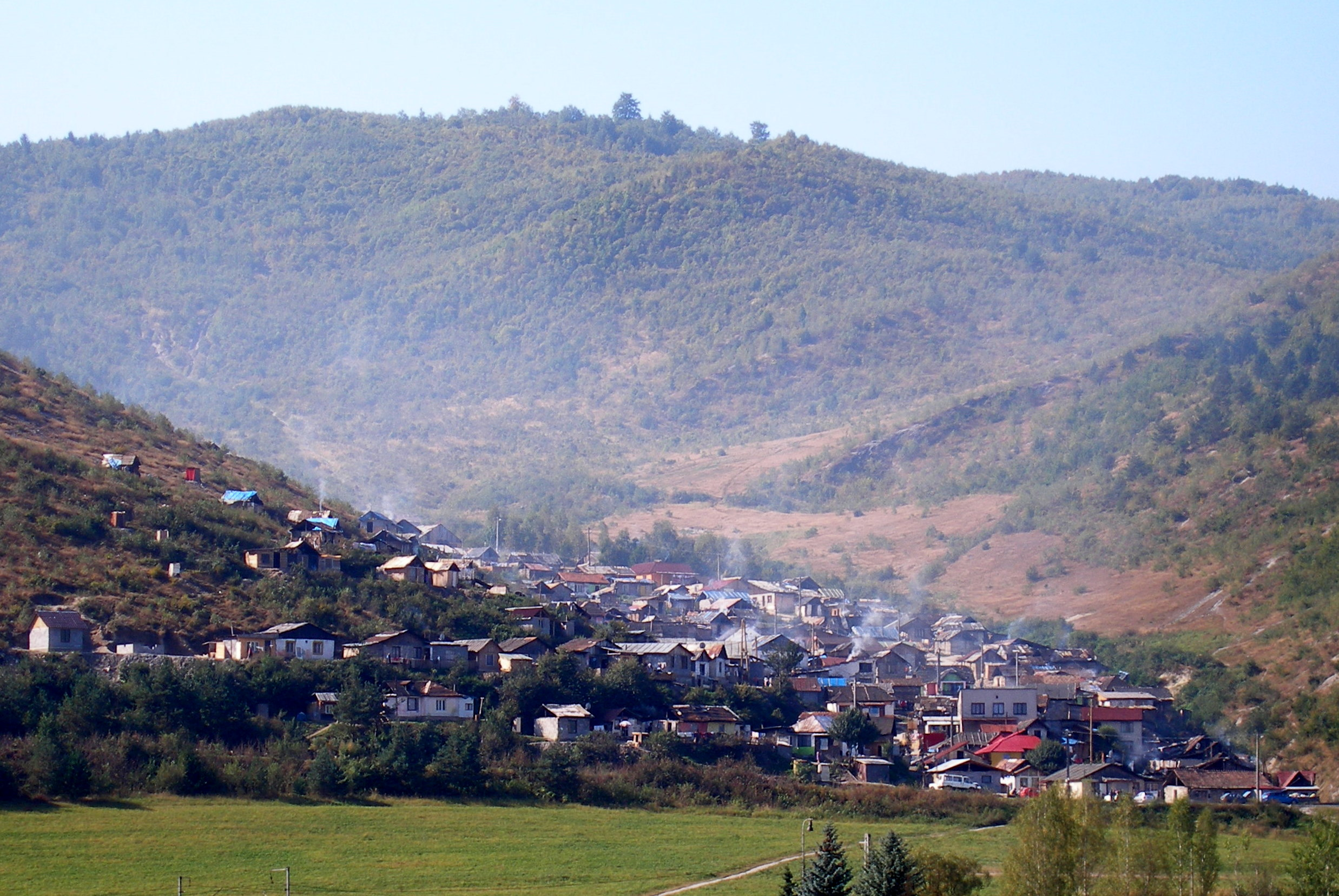
Romani settlement at Richnava.

During the mid-1950s, research was conducted by the Slovak government determining that there were 1,305 segregated Romani shantytowns throughout Slovakia. In 1965, after failed attempts at economic and social integration, the Slovak government began to attempt more drastic policies aimed at assimilation of the Romani body politic. Directed primarily at Romani settlements in Eastern Slovakia, these policies sought to create employment for all able-bodied Romani, particularly Roma males; termination of Romani shantytowns and resettlement into modern housing; and programs to support Romani students accessing formal education. In spite of these policies, shantytowns only decreased in number slowly; after the resettlement program was terminated as a result of post-socialist funding shortages, shantytowns began to grow again, largely due to economic conditions. By 2004, there were an estimated 320,000 Romani individuals living in Slovakia in 1,575 "integrated and segregated settlements."

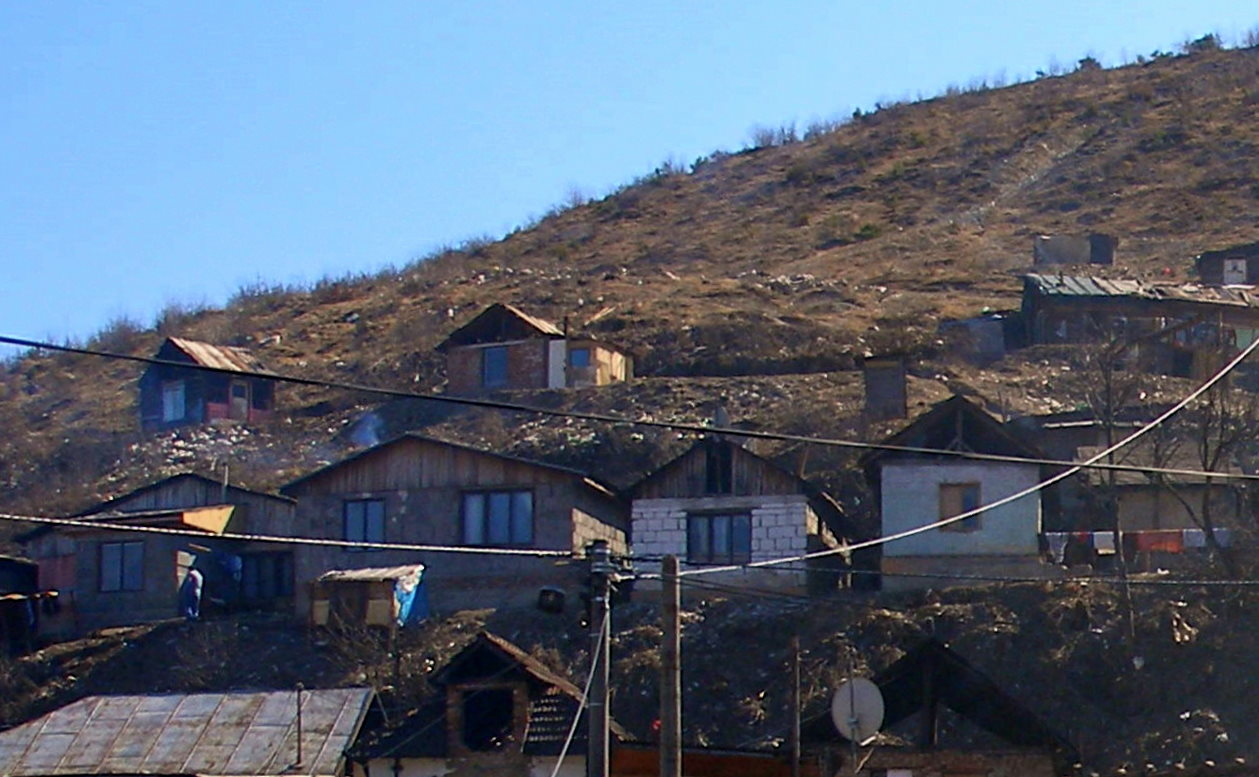
Alternative view of deforestation above Romani houses, Richnava.

As these settlements have grown, impoverished Romani communities became more visible, land has become scarce, and tensions with non-Romani communities have risen. The environmental implications of this scenario have been that these communities have been marginalized onto environmentally problematic parcels of land, where patterns of environmental issues entail exposure to hazardous waste and chemicals, vulnerability to floods, limited access to potable water, and discriminatory waste management practices. The rapid growth of these settlements in a context where freedom of settlement and movement is restricted due to discrimination from the majority population has complicated property rights and entitlements and hence the legal ability to participate in land-based decision-making.

=== Evictions ===
On October 30, 2012, 150 people were evicted from their homes in the district of Nižné Kapustníky (Košice). Further evictions were planned for 200 people from the Pod Hrádkom neighbourhood of Prešov under similar legal circumstances. According to the European Roma Rights Centre (ERRC), these evictions are part of a growing trend in the Slovak Republic in which authorities are justifying evictions by designating Romani settlements as "communal waste". Over 400 mayors of towns and villages in Slovakia have joined a movement by the name of Zobudme sa! (Let's Wake Up!) which, according to the ERRC, "aspires to coordinate a targeted programme of demolition aimed at Roma settlements by defining them as waste dumps".

=== Rudňany ===
The region of Slovenské Rudohorie has a long industrial history, which includes gold, silver, copper, and other metal mining and processing, and has been listed as being one of the ten most polluted regions in Slovakia.The region and mine tailings is contaminated with mercury, acidic water from sulfide, and lead.

In the village of Rudňany, there has been a Romani settlement situated on top of the abandoned factory site of Zabíjanec since the 1970s; after the site's closure in 1965 it was likely settled with the "silent approval" of socialist authorities. As of 2011, 640 persons lived there, in conditions severely contaminated by heavy metals. Children at Zabíjanec are at particularly high risk of health effects, such as neurological damage.

By 2003, the number of industrial workers in the mines and processing plants had decreased from 2,500 at the start of the 1990s to 150. In 2010, 1,700 out of Rudňany's 3,775 inhabitants were Romani, who are highly segregated from the majority population. Many also live in the Pätoracké shantytown; according to Filčák, approximately 570 Romani were living there in 2011. These Romani communities largely settled in the area during the 1950s to work as miners.

In the 1970s, subsidence of structures above the mine shafts, along with encroaching contaminated mine waste compelled authorities to relocate residents from Pätoracké to new homes in Spišská Nová Ves and Smižany. However, the Romani shantytowns were not relocated, nor were new Romani migrants prevented from settling in the area. In 2007, in response to a sinkhole incident in 2001, 257 residents were relocated to new apartments, which while outside the landslide and subsidence danger zones, are still surrounded by dumps of mine waste, while also continuing to be ethnically segregated. As of 2009, over 300 people remained in the danger zone, living in a shantytown without sewers, sewage treatment, running water, or garbage collection. Meanwhile, residents from the main village of Rudňany municipality regularly dispose of household waste in an unauthorized dump 300 meters below the Pätoracké settlement.

=== Krompachy ===
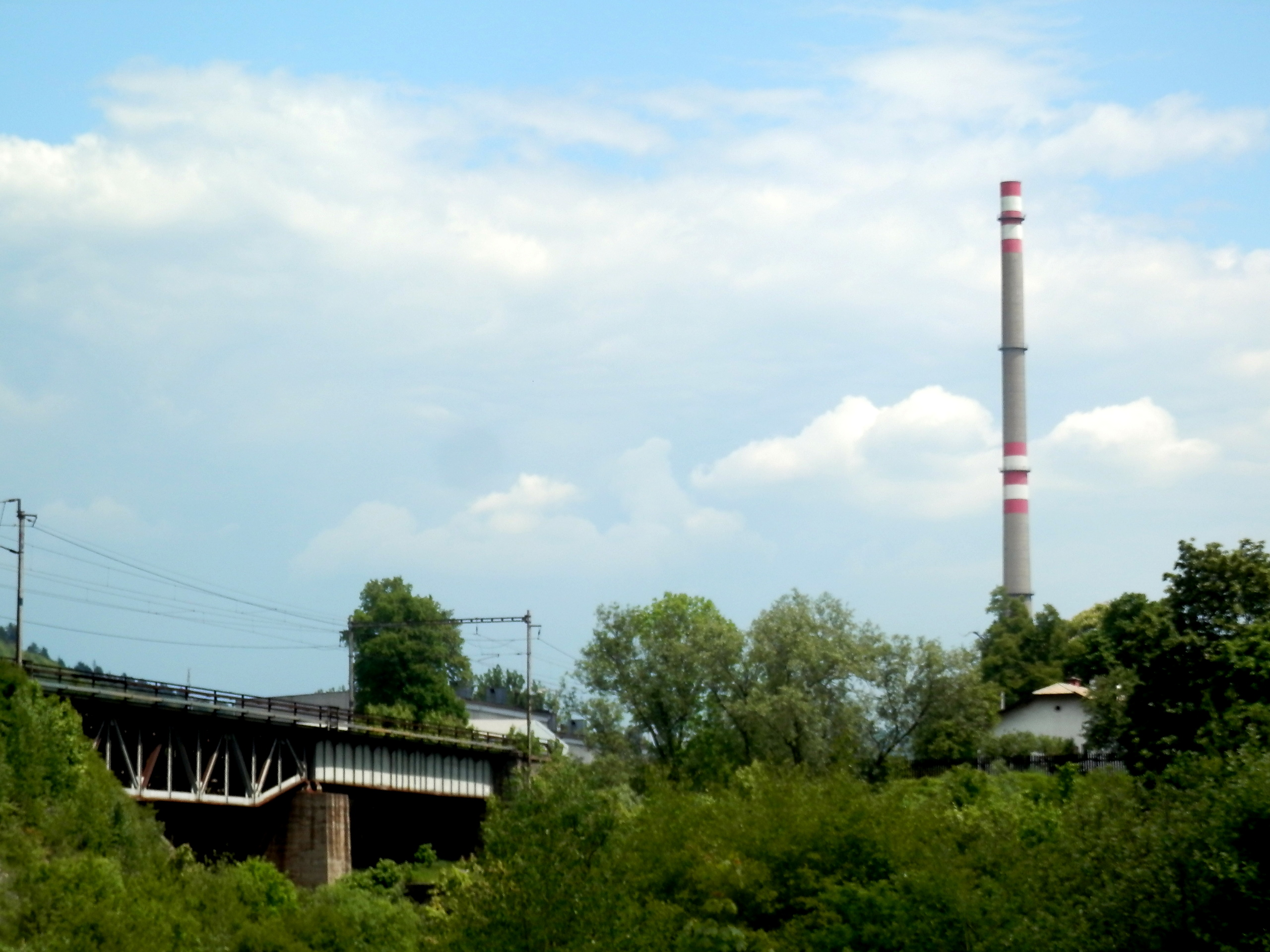
Krompachy smelter

The Romani settlement in Krompachy has 400 residents, largely former employees of the nearby copper smelter. Separated from the town of Krompachy by a road and a stream, the settlement is located at the foot of a hill next to the smelter. Only several apartments in the settlement are occupied by non-Romani families, most of whom left the area over time. The Krompachy smelter has been producing electrolytic copper in Slovakia since 1937, and is the only facility of its kind in the country. According to measurements taken by the Slovak Academy of Sciences, the area is highly contaminated with arsenic, lead, zinc, and copper, and there is unsubstantiated evidence to suggest that contamination may be more severe in the Romani settlement than in the town proper.

=== Trebišov ===
In a Romani neighbourhood in the town of Trebišov, there is a slaughterhouse and meat-processing plant. These facilities are the source of odours and waste which is stored in open containers in an unfenced location that is frequented by Romani people in search of food. Due to the rapid rate of decay of this unrefrigerated waste, especially during the summer, it poses a significant health risk for those who consume it, while also attracting insects and rats.

=== Svinka River Watershed ===
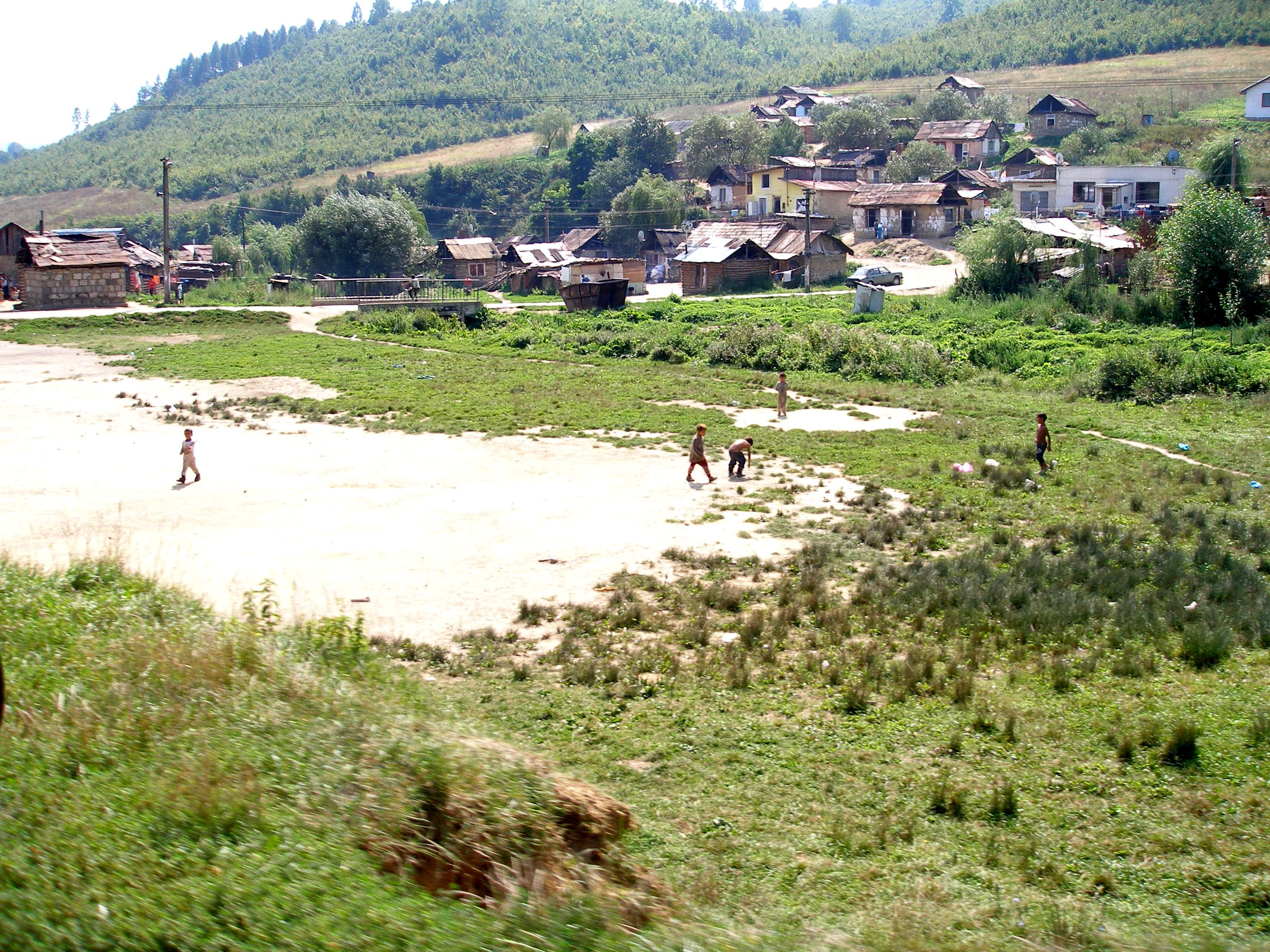
Romani settlement near Chminianske Jakubovany, Prešov

The Romani shantytowns of Hermanovce, Jarovnice, and Svinia are located within several kilometres of each other within the upper Svinka River Watershed; all three have histories of being subject to flooding. Jarovnice, which has an unofficial population of 5,000, is one of the largest shantytowns in Slovakia. Residents do not have access to safe, potable water. Water quality in all three settlements has been problematic, particularly with regards to increasing nitrates contamination from industrial fertilizers used by agricultural activity in the region. In 1998, 47 people died in floods in the region; 45 of the victims were Romani, and 42 of them were from Jarovnice. One person from Svinia died, and 500 people from the shantytown had to be evacuated. In Hermanovce, there is a Romani shantytown of 300 persons located on low-lying land with a high water table in between forks of the Svinka River; meanwhile, the village dump is located in close proximity above the shantytown, and is not lined to prevent leachate contamination, causing seepage into the community. According to Filčák, the construction of a landfill "in close proximity to the Roma settlements, without involvement of the affected people is almost a 'classical' example of the environmental injustice in both distributional and procedural aspects".

In the words of Anna Husarova, a Romani woman from Jarovnice, the location of these settlements in relation to flood vulnerability has a historical context:

[After the war] survivors had to settle next to forests, in the middle of fields or on riverbanks. These were the only places where they were allowed to settle down and start over. They built huts and began to call them flats. No attention was paid to them, and they were given no help.

Other Romani settlements in Chminianske Jakubovany, Petrova, and Markovce have also experienced vulnerability to flooding.

== Hungary ==
In Hungary, the proximity of Romani settlements to garbage dumps along with a lack of access to potable water and sanitation infrastructure has been an ongoing concern. In a Romani shantytown in Heves, the recycling of car batteries from an unauthorized dump for income caused the death of one child and serious disabilities among a number of residents. In Hungary, it is believed that environmental health conditions contribute to the low life expectancy of Romani people, whose life expectancy is on average 10–15 years lower than for non-Romani.

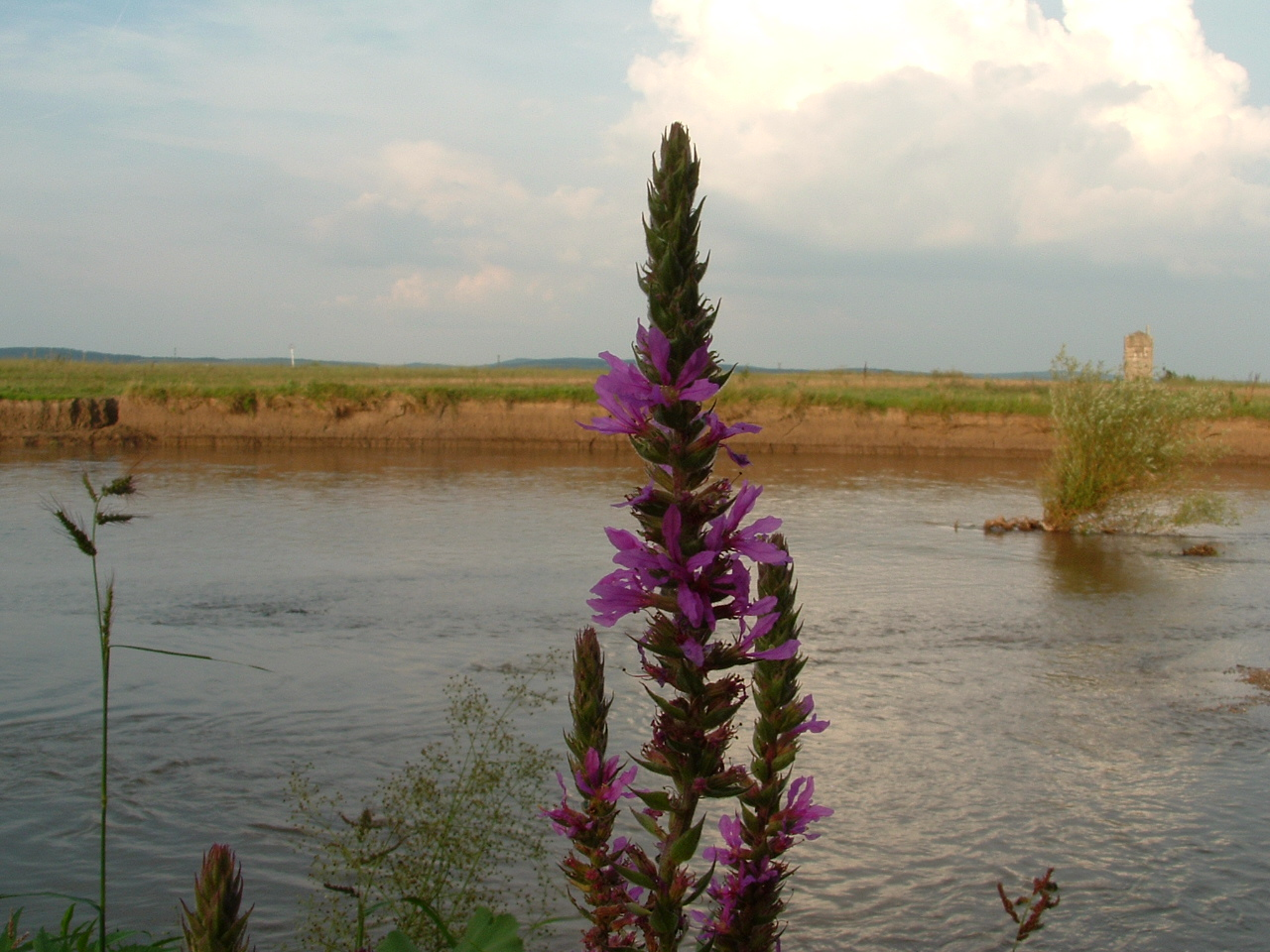
Sajó River near Sajószentpéter.

According to the European Roma Rights Centre, in Ózd-Bánszállás, Hungary, a situation exists where hundreds of Romani persons living in a segregated neighbourhood do not have reliable clean water access and must use three contaminant-risk pumps. According to the ERRC report,

The town won a Swiss development grant some three years ago to improve water infrastructure but Roma neighbourhoods seem to have been omitted from this development plan. The young mayor is a member of the far-right Jobbik party.

According to 2010 data from Hungary's National Development Agency, 4.7% of predominantly Romani settlements did not have access to a public water supply (relying instead on makeshift wells and open water sources such as streams), and that a further 11.1% had access to public wells, but no access to tap water or sewerage. According to the United Nations Development Program's 2011 Regional Roma Survey, 30% of Romani households in Hungary did not have access to a "piped, public water supply and remained dependent on water where the quality was not tested by the competent public authorities".

Another region facing environmental issues is Sajószentpéter. A town of 14,000 near Miskolc in northeastern Hungary, it was a minor industrial center for the majority of the 20th century, namely in the production of coal and glass. During the market transition from socialism, both the factory and the mine were closed down, causing the entire population of the town to lose its employment within the span of several months, without new economic development since.

A Romani settlement in Sajószentpéter is located separately from the town in a nearby wetland, and is connected by a bridge. Several issues of environmental injustice have been identified, such as illegal dumping in the Romani settlement by non-Romani as well as residents, as well as unequal access to green space, water distribution, sewerage, and housing quality.

Following the formation of a grassroots community organization in the Romani settlement called the Sajó River Association for Environment and community Development (SAKKF), Romani and youth-led initiatives in partnership with outside activists have seen the development of ongoing environmental-justice oriented projects. One project that resulted from these initiatives was the Romani youth-led photography exhibit, 'This is also Sajószentpéter' ('Ez is Sajószentpéter'), which was held at Central European University in June 2007.

== Ukraine ==
=== Access to water ===
According to the UNECE pilot country reports on Equitable Access to Water (2013), 32% of Romani households in Ukraine have indoor water access, while 18% derive their water from open-air sources such as streams.

=== Kyiv ===
According to a 2014 report by the Romani women's rights organization Chiricli, two large Romani settlements in Kyiv were identified as having severely substandard living conditions. One of the settlements, situated in Holosiivo, was situated on top of a former dump. This site is reportedly known to have formerly interned "radioactive substances dangerous to human health". In addition to potential hazards regarding the radioactive history of the site, the settlement was approximately forty minutes away from the nearest source of water, so residents had to use water from a nearby sewage-contaminated stream.

=== Zakarpats'ka Oblast ===
Serious issues regarding access to clean water and sanitation for Romani communities (tabors) in Zakarpats'ka oblast have been documented.

Near the village of Myrcha, 35 kilometres northeast of Uzhhorod, there is an isolated Romani settlement of 150 persons located next to a forest. The community does not have access to clean drinking water. Residents derive their drinking water from rainfall collection; during drier months, the residents have no choice but to collect water from a stream that allegedly "smells like chemicals", according to residents interviewed by the European Roma Rights Center. Authorities for the main village of Myrcha have cited legal and logistical challenges as barriers to providing water infrastructure to the settlement. In the words of the mayor, when interviewed by Szilvasi and Novrotskyy about improving water access for the Romani tabor:

We want to help them, but the problem is the Ukrainian law, the tabor is beyond the village, we first need to include them in the cadaster (...) this [building the well] would need a geological investigation as well and involve much bureaucracy. The paper work would be greater than the work itself, and precludes us from even starting such a project.

Outside Berehove, an estimated five to six thousand Romani persons live in a settlement with limited to no access to clean drinking water, and with no access to sewerage. There are three public taps available, however they are usually either turned off or non-functional. According to Szilvasi and Novrotskyy, a major part of the problem is the alleged corruption of the "baron" system, whereby unelected individuals from the Romani community are designated by municipal authorities to steward the water and sanitation infrastructure. Barons are granted significant sums of money for their role, with no system of oversight in place to ensure that services are delivered. The payouts are not tied to any quantitative water consumption by residents of the Romani community, resulting in a system where barons are effectively paid to neglect water and sanitation infrastructure.

In Uzhhorod, several thousand Romani persons live at five separate settlements throughout the city. Water and sanitation access varies, with some houses and neighborhoods having better services than others. Between 2013 and 2016, three of the tabors received new access to formal water utilities, although access often does not reach all houses due to limited infrastructure and low water pressure. Issues of water affordability for some residents persist, and the lack of reliable access has been documented as an ongoing fire hazard.

Near Mukachevo, a Romani settlement of five thousand persons was serviced by a high-risk water supply that was contaminated and subject to major leakage. Following a hepatitis epidemic in the community in 2013, tests were ordered to track the origin of the outbreak. The water supply was confirmed as the source of the pathogens and was promptly shut off. No replacement water source was provided by the municipality. By 2016, a new above-ground pipe was constructed "with the support of international donors" to supply the settlement. In contrast to nearby Muchaceve, which receives water services 24 hours a day, the Romani settlement only receives water for four hours a day.

In Chop, both the Romani as well as majority-culture communities face issues regarding water resource sustainability. The city of Chop, as of 2016, is currently experiencing a dispute involving the Ukrainian national railway company, Ukrainian Railways. The state-owned corporation owns the entire water distribution infrastructure of Chop, and is responsible for its maintenance. Persistent issues of water contamination, leakage, and corrosion have reportedly been seriously neglected, prompting the municipality to attempt to take over ownership of the waterworks system. The Romani settlement on the outskirts of the city has particularly limited access to water; even the houses that are connected to the utility receive such low-pressure in the pipes that residents rely on carrying water by hand from nearby wells.

=== Donetsk and Luhansk Oblast ===
According to a 2014 report by Chiricli, the situation for Romani persons within Ukraine's "Anti-Terrorist Operation (ATO) Zone" (Donetsk and Luhansk Oblast) was dire. Most Romani residents did not have reliable access to water, electricity, or food. According to one woman from Makiivka, Romani residents would sometimes not be able to access water for as long as five days.

=== Crimea ===
According to Chiricli, most Romani homes in Crimea, including the city of Simferopol, did not, as of 2014, have access to water or electricity.

=== Kharkiv ===
In 2015, Romani refugees in Kharkiv from Sloviansk were reportedly directed to live in severely damaged, previously abandoned housing with no water or electricity.

== Moldova ==
According to the United Nations Development Program's 2011 Regional Roma Survey, 66% of Romani households in Moldova did not have access to a "piped, public water supply and remained dependent on water where the quality was not tested by the competent public authorities".

== Romania ==
Persistent patterns of environmental racism exist throughout Romania, affecting the Romani minority (not to be confused with the majority ethnic Romanian population). These issues exist within a context of severe poverty. According to scholar Florin Botonogu, "Despite the clear provisions of the Romanian law forbidding human settlements close to garbage pits or other pollution sources, there are many communities in Romania situated in such an environment." Romanian scholar Cătălin Berescu has in 2010 written that an estimated 2,000 shanty towns exist throughout Romania, inhabited by approximately 1 million individuals, 90 percent of whom are ethnic Romani. According to Berescu, the development of shantytowns has been a relatively recent phenomenon, only becoming visible since the fall of Communism.

In the opinion of Botonogu,

Maybe labeling this situation as racism, as nobody forces them to stay there, is not that obvious, but the fact that in the whole country only Roma communities live in these conditions and the tolerance of the cities to the huge health risks, child labour and general misery represents, for sure, a different treatment by the local authorities towards these groups. Truth is that they have no other option; they have been denied any other job or place to settle.

According to the United Nations Development Program's 2011 Regional Roma Survey, 72% of Romani households in Romania did not have access to a "piped, public water supply and remained dependent on water where the quality was not tested by the competent public authorities."

=== Pata Rât dump and chemical waste site ===
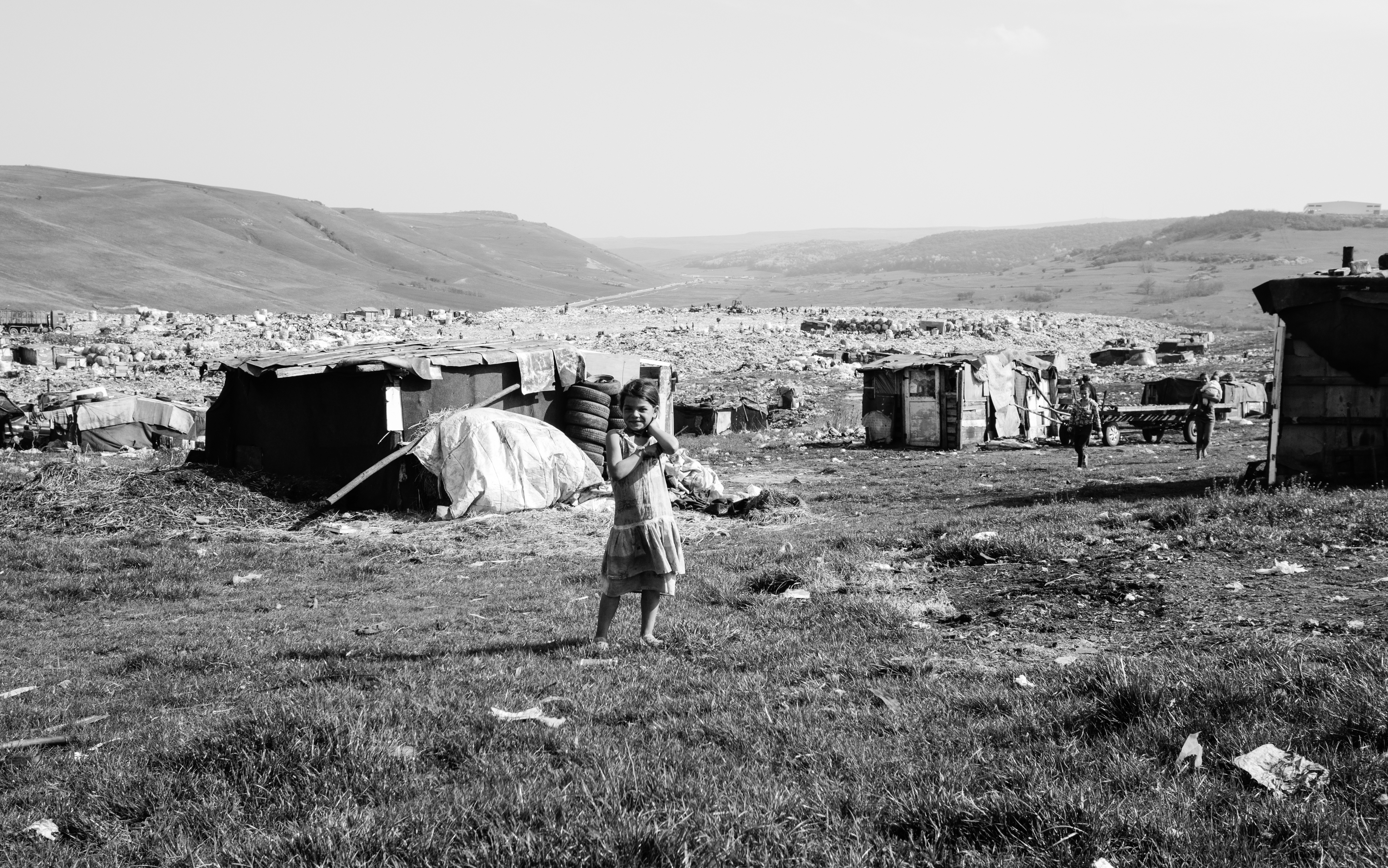
Cluj landfill, Pata Rât.

In Pata Rât, Cluj County, Romani persons scavenge from a dump as their primary source of income. As of 2013, it was estimated that 1,500 people were living at the site in extreme poverty; in the 1960s, only four families were documented as living there. Today, there are a total of four separate settlements at the Pata Rât dump; 42% of residents were moved to the site by local authorities. The overwhelming majority of residents are from the Romani minority, many of whom work at the site in slave-like conditions of indentured or bonded labour while the Romanian government and private contractors maintain ownership of the waste. Journalists are unwelcome at the site, where filming is strictly prohibited.

According to Enikő Vincze, "the formation of the Cluj landfill as a space of precarious and stigmatized housing and labour, is a site of environmental racism". Predominantly Romani neighbourhoods from throughout the city of Cluj have been evicted and relocated to the dump since 2002. Many different Romani subgroups, further divided by family lines, have been settled into an area near the dump on Cantonului Street, causing inter-community tensions and violence. In 2010, 300 residents of Coastei street were evicted and resettled at the dump near a chemical waste site. The newly vacated neighbourhood was subsequently transferred, for free, to the Archbishop of Feleac and Cluj for the purpose of constructing a campus for students of Orthodox Theology at the Babes-Bolyai University of Cluj.

In spite of the traumatic nature of the relocation, the Romani community of Coastei Street, which was well integrated in the city and closely connected with urban services, engaged in organized efforts to maintain their social connections to Cluj (such as sending their children to their old schools in the city, and by organizing to ensure access to public transit). With support from NGOs such as the European Roma Rights Centre (ERRC), Working Group of Civil Organizations (gLOC), and Amnesty International, these efforts, which included protests in Cluj, culminated in the formal acquisition of land at Pata Rât. On January 7, 2014, Cluj-Napoca County Court (Tribunal) ruled that the eviction and relocation from Coastei Street was illegal, ordering city authorities to compensate the Romani community for damages, and to also provide compensation for the inadequate housing situation caused by the relocation.

=== Miercurea Ciuc ===
In 2004, authorities in the city of Miercurea Ciuc relocated 100 Romani persons to a site with 12 shacks next to a sewage treatment plant, despite sanctions from the Romanian National Council for Combating Discrimination and the European Court for Human Rights. The relocated persons at the settlement were only granted access to four public toilets in the settlement, and only one source for potable water. Insufficient barriers allowed children to access industrial equipment near the site, posing safety hazards. The plant also emits toxic gases, where warning signs posted surrounding the site explicitly state "Attention! Toxic gas". Medically unconfirmed reports from residents claim that two infants have died as a result of the gases.

The settlement was only accessible by dirt road, with no public transportation. By 2010, 150 persons were living at the site. The settlement was originally mandated to be temporary in nature, yet by 2010 it had been there for five years. At another settlement near Miercurea Ciuc, 25 people were documented in 2010 as living at or near a garbage pit near a stray dog facility, outside city limits. The inhabitants of this unnamed settlement did not have access to public transportation for sending their children to school; the sole source of employment was scavenging through garbage; and many of the inhabitants were documented as not having identity cards, making it impossible to access social insurance and subsidized health care.

=== Baia Mare chemical plant ===
On June 1, 2012, hundreds of Romani from the Craica ghetto of Baia Mare were forcibly relocated by local authorities to a former chemical laboratory at a decommissioned chemical factory. Many observers viewed the relocation as an effort by Mayor Cătălin Cherecheș to gain popularity among racist elements of the electorate leading up to elections nine days later. This incident followed the 2011 construction of a six foot high wall, also instigated by Cherecheș, to encircle a Romani neighbourhood in Baia Mare. Cherecheș has stated that living conditions would be favourable to the Romani at the chemical plant compared to Craica, despite the former factory having a reputation among Romanians as a "plant of death" due to its status as the second-most polluting chemical facility in the country.

Within several hours of arriving on site, 22 Romani children and two adults began to exhibit symptoms of chemical poisoning, resulting in a major response by emergency personnel and evacuation of the sick to hospital. It is believed the poisoning was caused by containers of chemical substances which had been abandoned at the property. Shortly afterwards, on June 3, the mayor's mother, Viorica Cherecheș, also a physician and the director of a local hospital, arrived on scene with a police presence, and ordered the relocated Romani to collect, without any safety equipment, all of the remaining chemical containers.

According to Marian Mandache, executive director of the Romani rights organization Romani CRISS, it is suspected that the action was to remove evidence of wrongdoing. On June 7, 36 Romani and non-Romani NGOs signed a letter to Romanian Prime Minister Victor Ponta regarding the relocation, and held a protest outside the Romanian parliament.

=== Other resettlements ===
In 2007, the city of Dorohoi displaced 14–15 Romani families following the demolishment of a housing complex. These individuals were then planned to be relocated to a social housing facility located close to a wastewater treatment plant and an industrial estate. Also in 2007, with funding from the European Commission (which has a financing policy that prohibits exclusionary forms of segregation) plans were developed to construct 20 houses for Romani within an industrial zone in Constanța, with no access to nearby schools, limited transportation, and no community facilities. Similar resettlements of Romani residents to environmentally problematic locations have taken place in Piatra Neamt, Episcopia Bihor quarter at Oradea, Bucharest, and Șimleu Silvaniei, of which the former two cases had residents located near and on top of garbage dumps, respectively.

== Bulgaria ==
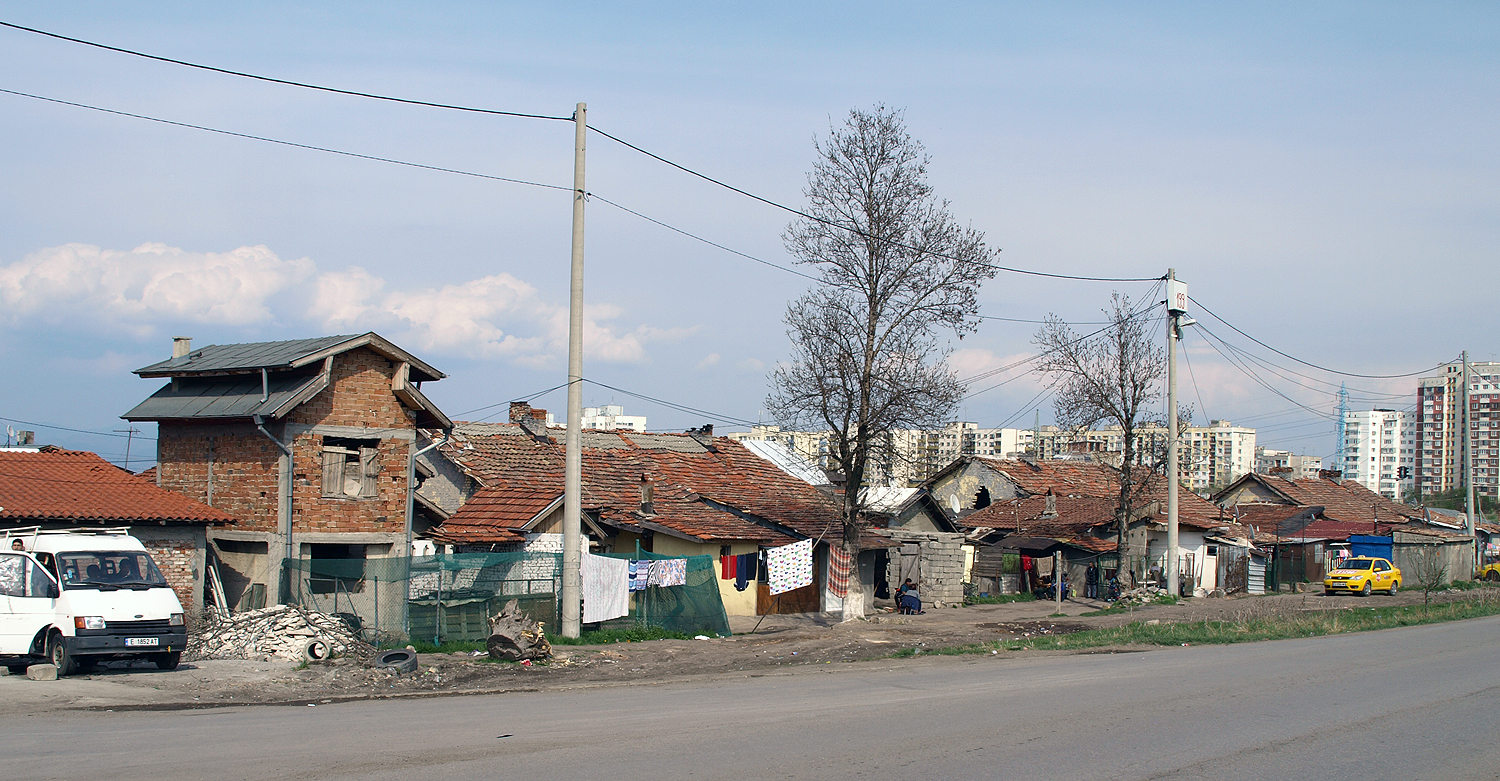
Romani district in Sofia.

According to Babourkova, Romani communities in Bulgaria have, in post-socialist times, been subject to "environmental injustices" such as unequal access to infrastructure, housing, and utilities. Bulgarian electricity distribution was privatized between 2000 and 2005. Prior to the collapse of socialism, access to electricity was near-universal; inequalities in distribution began to emerge following privatization. A number of Romani settlements throughout Bulgaria do not have any electrical services. Meanwhile, 89% of Romani persons in Bulgaria do not have access to clean water.

=== Fakulteta ===
In the Fakulteta district of Sofia, a Romani ghetto estimated at 60,000 residents (the official figure is 15,000), housing is predominantly substandard, public transit is minimal, water supply and sewerage is limited, and the electrical network is inadequate and subject to frequent failures. In the poorest section of Fakulteta, Glavova mahala, only one water outlet exists for 200 families. Until June 2003, medical services in the community were "non-existent". Because the city of Sofia does not provide garbage collection services, residents regularly burn their garbage and children have been documented burning old tires, causing them to be exposed to toxic gases which may contain carcinogens such as dioxins. Another concern is the illegal dumping of solid and hazardous waste. Construction firms regularly dump potentially toxic waste in Fakulteta to skirt disposal regulations; a former green space in the settlement has been converted into an illegal disposal site.

=== Stolipinovo ===
In the Romani settlement of Stolipinovo in Plovdiv, residents had their electricity shut off by the private Austrian utility company EVN Group in February 2002, due to the community's cumulative failure to pay utility bills since the early 1990s. Following the shutdown, protests and confrontations with police ensued, and the entire settlement had its electrical access reduced to the hours of 7pm to 7am, causing significant challenges for food storage and preparation. Babourkova argues that this incident is "a clear-cut case of distributional injustice towards the Roma population of Stolipinovo leading to a disproportionate health burden for local residents".

== Slovenia ==
According to Amnesty International, "Slovenia is a highly developed country and enjoys a GDP per capita above the average in the European Union", with nearly 100% access to clean water. However, also according to Amnesty International, an estimated 20 to 30 percent of southeastern Slovenian Romani settlements do not have access to clean water. Due to the lack of precise, comprehensive information, it is believed that this statistic under-represents the prevalence of water access issues for Slovenian Romani. In the Romani settlement of Dobruška vas in Škocjan, residents have reported having to drink water from a stream contaminated by sewage and waste from a slaughterhouse, and a local pediatrician from Novo Mesto has testified that children from the settlement experience extremely high rates of illnesses such as diarrhea and Rotavirus.

In the words of UN Expert on Human Rights – Water and Sanitation Catarina de Albuquerque, speaking on June 1, 2010 regarding the situation for Slovenian Romani:

The consequences of this lack of access to water and sanitation are devastating for these communities. ... In one community with no access to water, the people drink from a polluted stream, or have to walk for 2 hours to obtain safe water. They collect the water in jerry cans to haul back to their homes. ... The situation is reminiscent of situations I have witnessed in much poorer countries and astonishing to observe in a country where so much has been achieved for the vast majority of the population.

== Croatia ==
According to the United Nations Development Program's 2011 Regional Roma Survey, 35% of Romani households in Croatia did not have access to a "piped, public water supply and remained dependent on water where the quality was not tested by the competent public authorities".

== Bosnia and Herzegovina ==
In Bosnia and Herzegovina, 17% of Romani persons lack access to electricity and 25.8% do not have household access to drinking water. Scrap metal collection is a dominant economic activity, despite its known health hazards. In Lukavac, northern Bosnia, a Romani settlement was subject to severe flooding in 2014, and residents did not receive government funding to rebuild. One severe example of environmental inequality in Lukavac, where Romani persons lack adequate access to energy resources, is the practice of coal theft. Young Romani men climb onto moving freight trains departing from the Lukavac coal mine in an attempt to push coal off the tops of the roofless cars by hand. After the coal falls to the ground, the men then collect the coal into 50 kilogram bags which are then sold in town for two Euros apiece. According to nearby residents, several individuals collecting coal have died in accidents involving trains as a result of this practice.

== Serbia ==
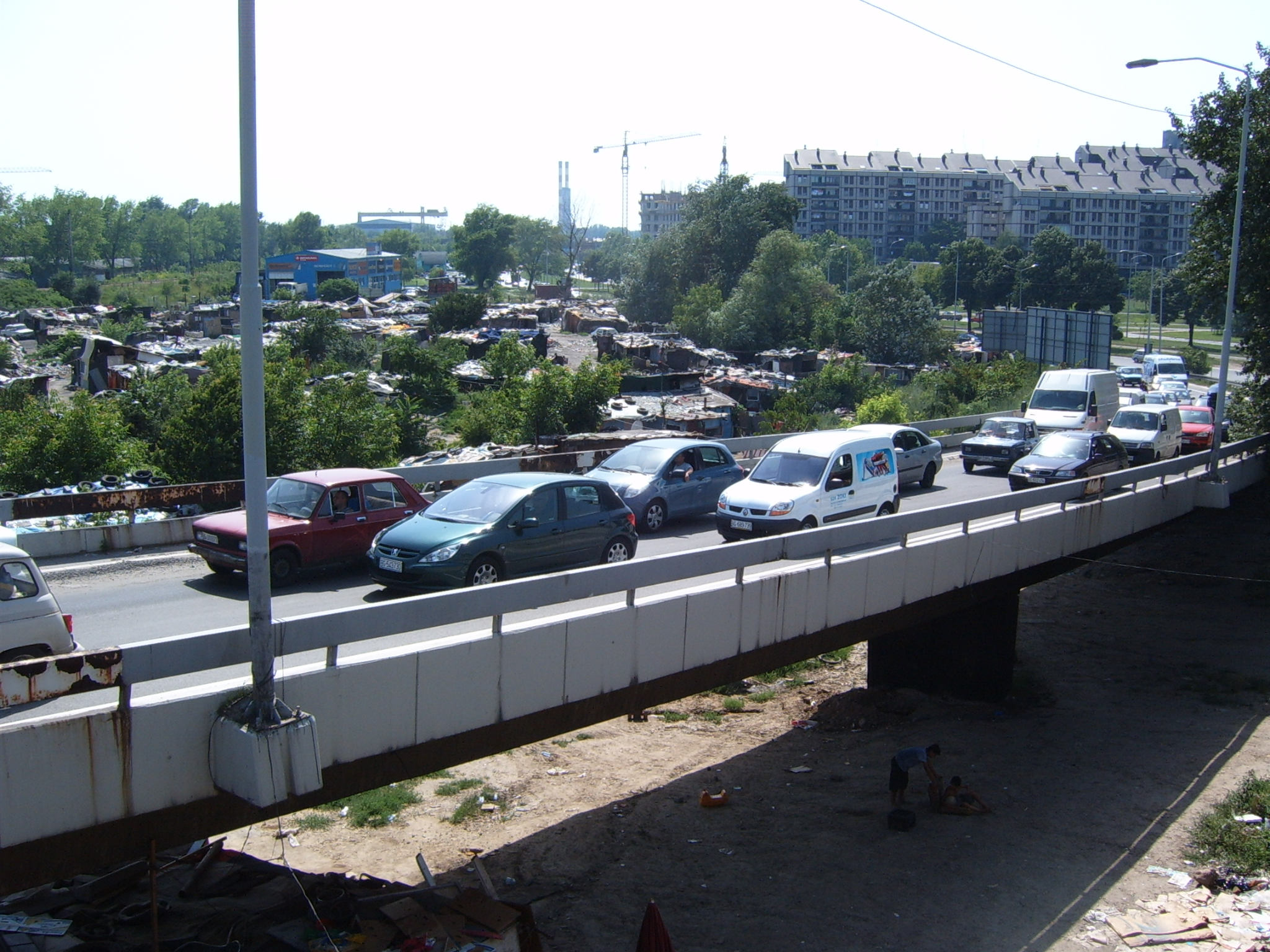
Gazela Settlement (Karton City), Belgrade

=== Gazela Settlement ===
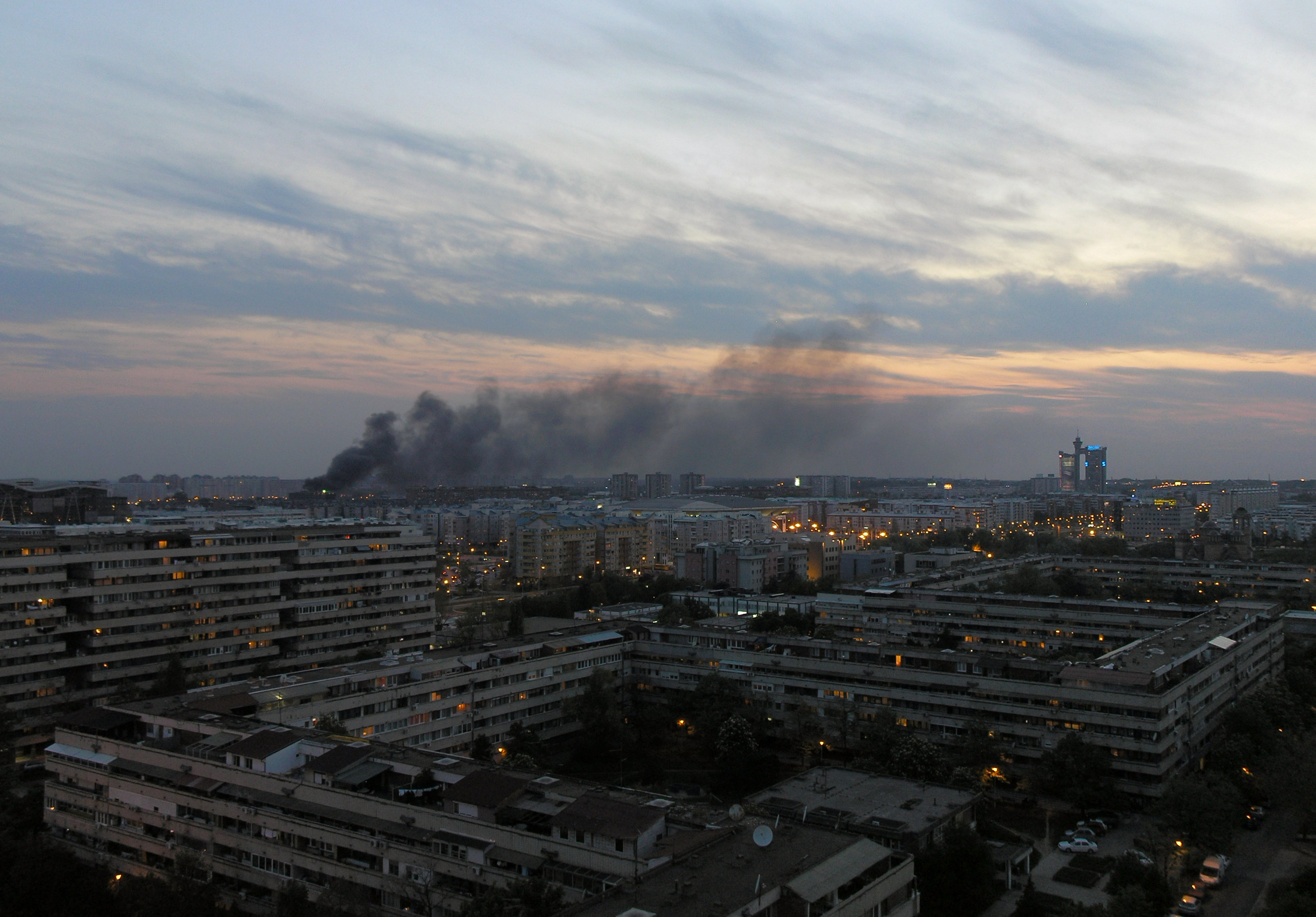
Fire near Romani settlement in Belgrade

An unplanned Romani settlement called Gazela (Karton City) was located in Belgrade, Serbia near a railway underneath the Gazela Bridge, one of the main highway access points to the city. It was dismantled in 2010.

=== The "We clean Serbia" campaign ===
Between 2009 and 2013, a national government-supported environmental campaign took place under the name "We clean Serbia". The campaign identified so-called "wild dumps" (open-air landfills with poor environmental controls) as the most significant pollution source in Belgrade, and sought to address ecological issues surrounding these dumps.

As part of the "We clean Serbia" campaign, the city government of Belgrade displaced 17 Romani slums that were on or near the dumps, which were formally classified as "unhygienic settlements". These informal settlements, where residents worked as waste pickers, were largely the direct result of the Yugoslav wars—especially the Kosovo war—as most of the residents came to inhabit these settlements as internally displaced persons (IDP's), refugees, or repatriated refugees. An estimated 75% of recycled materials in Serbia are gathered by informal waste pickers; however, this activity is illegal.

Over 2,800 slum residents were displaced, half of whom were settled into initially "temporary" shipping containers on the outskirts of Belgrade; the other half were evicted from Belgrade altogether. The container settlements have been criticized by economic anthropologist Eva Schwab, who has argued that social services provided to residents are tied to problematic "contracts of use" which require residents not to store scavenged materials near their containers, and to be employed by the Public Utility Service for its own recycling programmes. Under this system, Romani who do not comply are denied social services (such as education for their children) and face removal from their dwelling. Municipal governments in Belgrade have also complained of poor infrastructure in the container settlements and have documented failure of low-quality water pipes, which has resulted in flooding that has caused significant disruption for neighbouring communities.

=== Deponija ===
As of 2007, close to 1,000 persons in Belgrade were inhabiting the Romani settlement of Deponija (which means "dumping site" in Serbian). The settlement had been established in the 1970s situated on top of a former dump, which was officially shut down, gradually, in the 1980s. Polluting factories surround the settlement. The primary livelihood of residents was recycling from garbage trucks hired to dump in the community, an activity which frequently led to the unintended accumulation of non-recyclable waste in the settlement. The community lacked clean water, sewage treatment, and utility connections.

== Montenegro ==
=== Nikšič-Trebejsa & Železova ===
Situated near the city of Nikčić is one of the most populous Romani settlements in Montenegro. The settlement is isolated from the city, yet located between a steel production facility which emits hazardous pollutants and an iron ore mine. According to a 2017 European Roma Rights Centre report, "The air and land in the settlements is permanently contaminated by iron ore dust from passing trucks."

=== Konik 2 ===
Konik 2 is a camp for internally displaced persons from Kosovo of Romani origin, situated on the outskirts of the Montenegrin capital, Podgorica. In spite of oversight from the UNHCR and Italian Red Cross, as of 2014 the camp lacked basic access to safe, clean drinking water and sanitation, and has been serviced by only one water tap.

== North Macedonia ==
=== Prilep and Tetovo ===
In the Romani settlement of Prilep in North Macedonia, there is no working sewage system. A similar situation exists in a Romani settlement in Tetovo, where there is no clean water, electricity or sewerage, and high rates of disease.

=== Skopje ===
As of 2016, along the Vardar River in central Skopje, North Macedonia, there is a Romani settlement of approximately two hundred persons who do not have safe access to clean drinking water. Sewerage and sanitation services do not exist, and garbage accumulation is a concern. The pump used to provide water from the Vardar River had previously been used for agricultural purposes, and has repeatedly tested positive for contaminants.

=== Veles ===
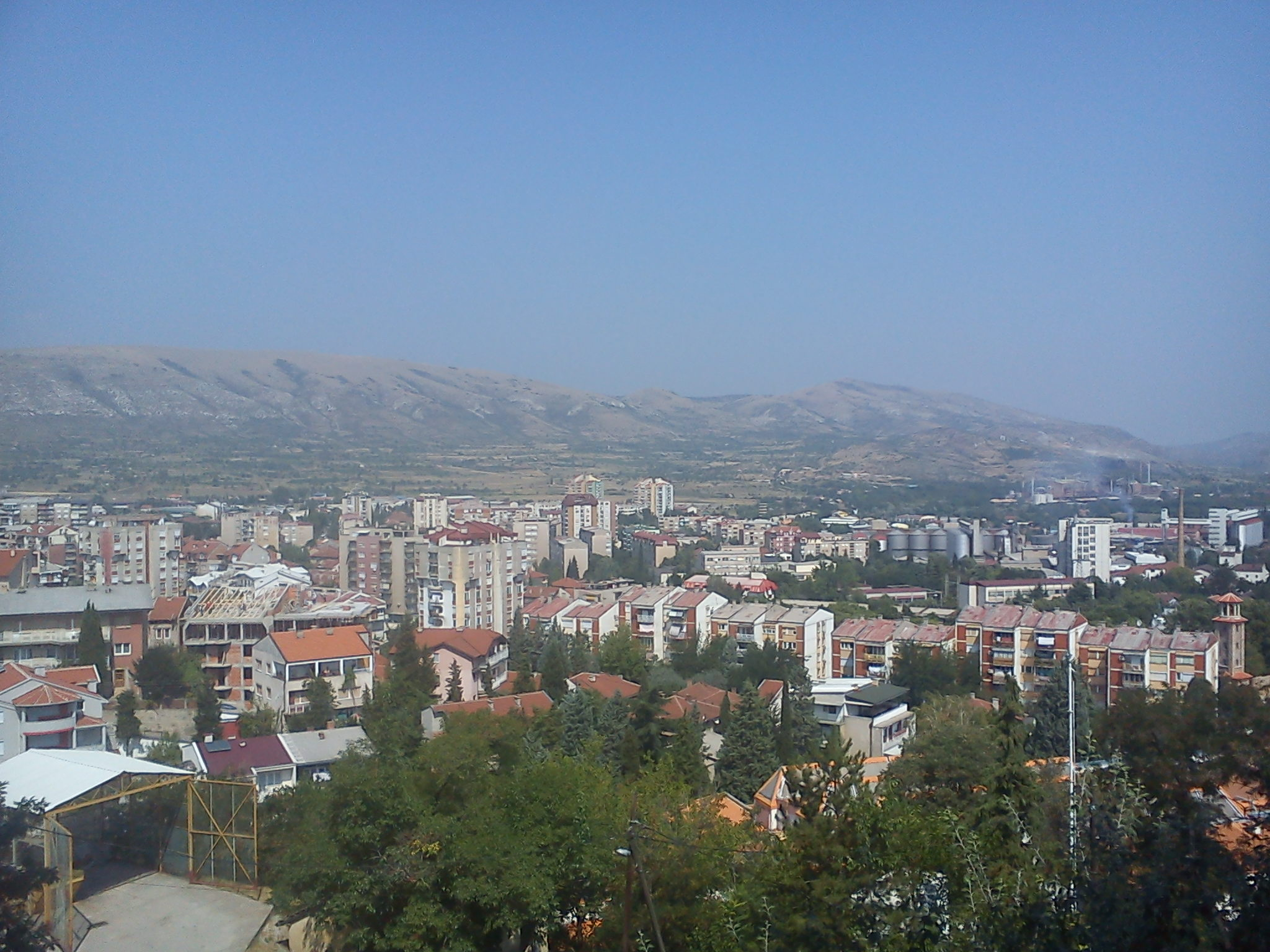
Veles, North Macedonia.

For thirty years until 2003, 700 mostly Romani families in the town of Veles, North Macedonia, were exposed annually to 62,000 tons of zinc, 47,300 tons of lead, and 120,000 tons of sulphur dioxide from a nearby smelting plant. Despite opposition from experts advising the project, the smelter was built 300 meters from the houses of 60,000 people. Frequently, newborns in the town were diagnosed with cancer, respiratory or blood issues, lung disease, and heart disease. In 2005, Veles pediatrician Rozeta Bosilkova stated "My patients do not respond well to any treatment, even for the common cold. This is because their defence mechanisms have been badly eroded." According to the Association for the Protection of Future Generations of Veles, the children of two families were tested with lead levels between five and seven times normal concentrations.

Due to concerns over food contamination, in 2001 the mayor of Veles requested that all agricultural and cattle farming operations be shut down. In 2005, one doctor working in the town described the situation as resembling a "horror film", stating "Babies are being born with entire organs missing. The deformities are frightening."

Following proposals to re-open the smelter in 2006 by Metrudhem DOOEL Skopje, a series of protests and court battles took place. In 2014, the City of Veles deleted the plant from its Detailed Urban Plan, effectively shutting down the operation permanently, which was legally possible due to the plant having been closed for three years prior. Severe pollution from 1.7 million tons of slag remain; as of 2016, the Macedonian firm Ekocentar has won a contract to mine the slag for zinc, lead, and cadmium.

== Albania ==
=== Tirana, Lake Area ===
According to the European Roma Rights Centre, as recently as 2015 there was a large Romani settlement built above waste landfill on the outskirts of Tirana in Municipality 11 situated next to a "poisonous Tirana city lake". In absence of a reliable water system, residents obtained water from a private seller. During the frequent absences of this service, residents would obtain water from the lake, in spite of health concerns regarding its toxicity. Following an alleged robbery of a German tourist by a Romani individual from the area, the settlement was evicted in 2015.

According to the United Nations Development Program's 2011 Regional Roma Survey, 30% of Romani households in Albania did not have access to a "piped, public water supply and remained dependent on water where the quality was not tested by the competent public authorities".

== Kosovo ==
=== Mitrovica lead poisoning disaster ===
During the 1999 war in Kosovo, Romani communities did not align militarily with Serbian or Albanian forces during the ethnic-based conflict. As a result, four-fifths of the Romani people in Kosovo were violently expelled from their homes. NATO did not intervene. In total, 100,000 Romani Kosovars were displaced. 50,000 fled to the European Union; however, due to their legal status as internally displaced persons, they were not legally allowed to freely leave the territories of the former Yugoslavia.

The UNHCR relocated five hundred displaced Romani from Mitrovica to a camp in northern Kosovo located on top of an abandoned lead tailings site at the former Trepča mining complex in Kosovska. In 2005, the World Health Organization stated that "the worst environmental disaster for children in the whole of Europe" was happening, declaring the camps unfit for human habitation and in need of immediate evacuation. Prior to the war, the Romani community in Mitrovica was economically active. According to Skender Gushani of the Association for the Protection of Roma Rights Mitrovica

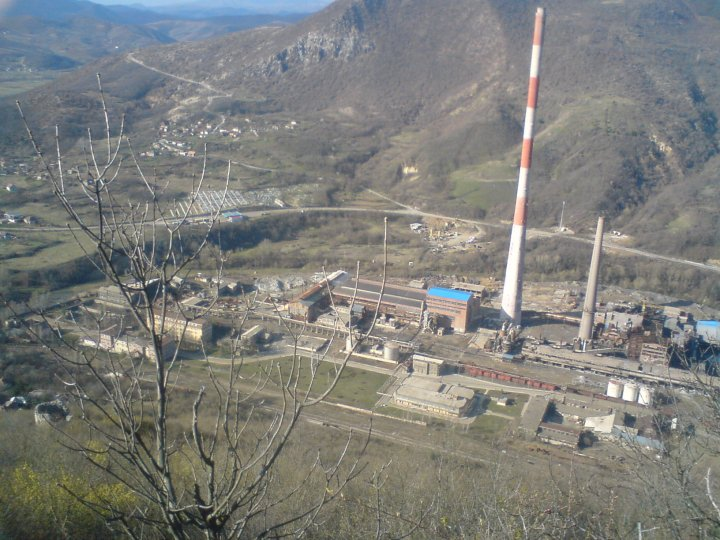
Trepča metallurgy facility

We [the Romani of Mitrovica] had shops, a market, restaurants, our own local government council with representatives, and we maintained our culture and traditions. We didn't have to go to town for anything because here we had everything we needed. In our neighbourhood we had technical equipments [sic], car repair shops and masons ... 6000 of us had jobs at Trepca, the battery factory of Zvecan, where we smelted lead. There were also some among us, about 20 of us, who are well-educated and worked in the local government council.

According to Avdula Mustafa, an activist with the Roma and Ashkalia Documentation Center, the UNHCR promised that the refugee camps in Kosovska were only temporary, and would be closed within 45 days. However, the UNHCR added a second and third camp, indicating no intention of relocating from the site. The names of the three camps were Cesmin Lug, Kablare, and Osterode. These camps were located on or near 500 tonnes of toxic waste. Across the River Ibar, there is a further 100 million tonnes of toxic slag, a legacy of mining and smelting activities at the Trepča complex whose operations spanned from 1927 to 2000.

At these new settlements, living conditions were severely substandard. Constructed by the UNHCR in collaboration with Action by Churches Together, houses on the toxic sites were built with lead-painted boards, no working sewerage system, and no reliable sources of running water. Residents lived in fear of violence from neighboring non-Romani communities, restricting their freedom of movement and ability to leave the camps.

In 2000, the World Health Organization conducted the first round of blood tests of residents in the camps. Blood lead levels were so high that the WHO recommended immediate evacuation of the camps, as well as fencing off the sites to prevent future exposure. In 2005, the WHO conducted further tests which determined that levels of lead in the blood of children from the camps were the highest ever recorded among humans.

Tests for lead poisoning among 60 children were administered by Dr. Miljana Stojanovich, a doctor working for the Institute of Public Health in Mitrovica, who later stated "I haven't heard of results like this from anywhere else in the world...such high lead-levels in blood from such a small area." The tests determined that most children had blood lead levels higher than 65 micrograms per deciliter, the highest Dr. Stojanovich's instruments could measure. Test samples sent to a lab in Belgium were re-taken in order to verify if such levels were even possible; the results confirmed that children tested held the highest concentrations of blood lead in medical literature. 10 micrograms per deciliter is the threshold at which brain damage begins, including IQ loss, according to Dorit Nitzan, Director of WHO Serbia, who has stated that the camps constitute "one of the most serious public health disasters in modern Europe".

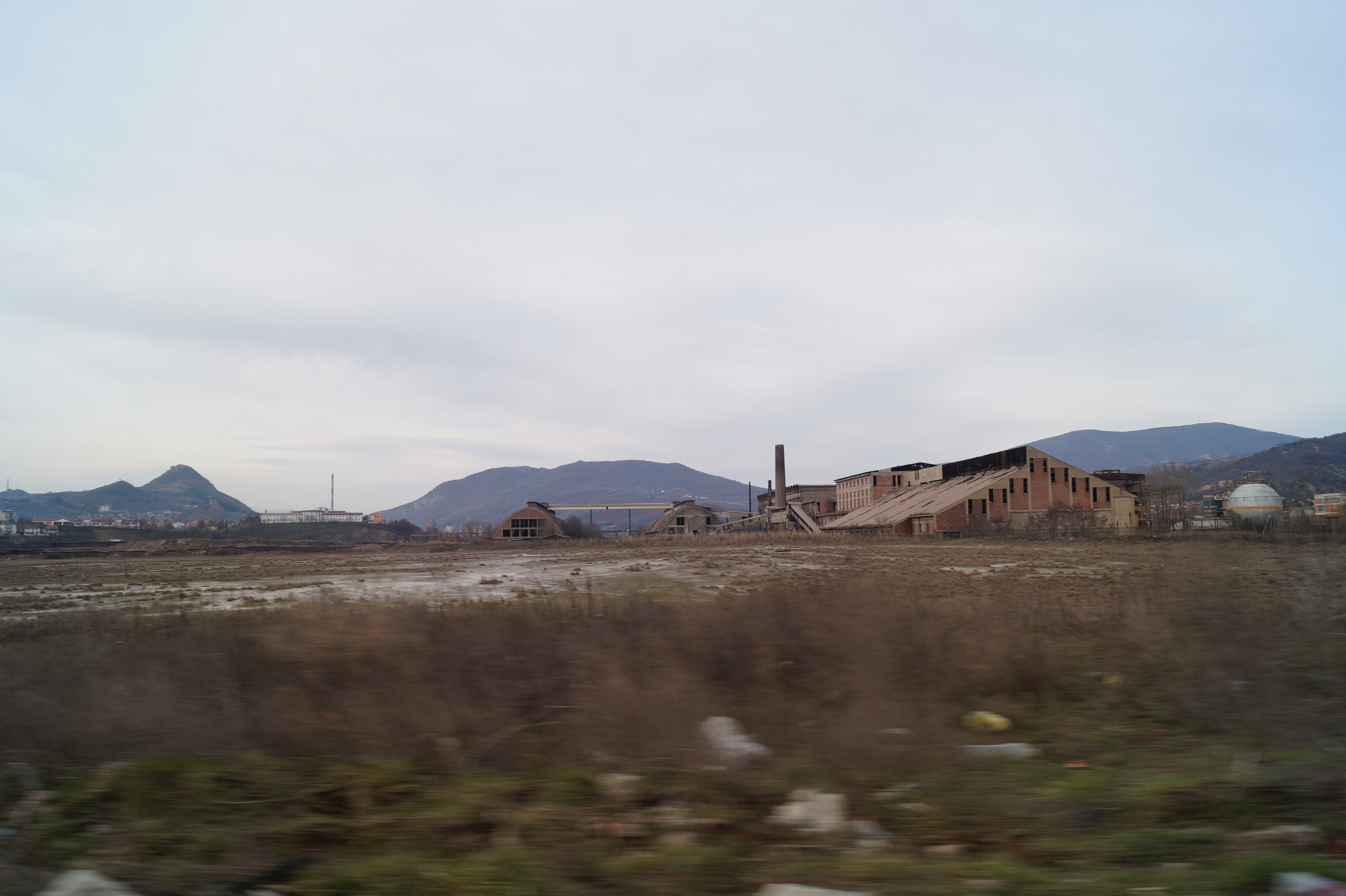
Trepça's factory ruins

In spite of concerns over lead exposure, the UNHCR decided to keep the camps open. Shortly after receiving the 2000 test results, the UN built a jogging track and basketball court between two of the settlements, naming the area the "Alley of Health". Signs in poorly translated English posted at the site by the UNHCR read

ALLEY OF HEALTH – LENGTH OF ALLEY – 1500 METERS – INHALE THE ODOUR OF HEALTH – THERE ARE CHALLENGES AWAITING FOR YOU – WIN – SPIRIT IS HEALTHY IN HEALTHY BODY

In the opinion of Ilija Elezovich from the Kosovo Health Authority during a 2005 interview, "the danger is so great that it threatens to destroy one full generation of Roma children ... they [UNHCR] made a catastrophic mistake by building these camps. Nobody cared about the danger of this location. This is very tragic for everybody, but especially for the Roma inhabitants."

According to a 2008 and subsequent 2009 interview with Avdula Mustafa, the UNHCR responded to intense international attention toward the case by publicly promoting a plan to move residents to a former French military barracks. However, this proposed site was only 50 meters away from one of the original settlements, and thus of minimal improvement in terms of environmental health effects. Romani activists such as Mustafa have speculated that the UNHCR was attempting to pressure residents into returning to their former homes, despite grave fears over their personal safety. Concern related to these allegations grew following withdrawals of international assistance including emergency medications used to mitigate lead poisoning among children and pregnant women. By 2005, 29 deaths had been recorded in the camps. By 2012, that number had risen to approximately 100, most of them children. In 2012, 100 families were moved off the contaminated site, but 40 families remained.

The UN Mission in Kosovo (UNMIK) has granted itself diplomatic immunity claiming it cannot be held legally accountable for its actions. However, a lawsuit was initiated by the European Roma Rights Centre in 2006 with the European Court of Human Rights. All children conceived in the camps have irreversible brain damage.
