= Stępień (surname) =

Stępień, also transcribed as Stepien is a Polish surname. Sometimes it may be phonetically transliterated as Stempien. The archaic feminine forms are Stępniowa (married) and Stępniówna (unmarried). It is derived from the nickname based on the verb stąpać, "to step" and which literally meant either a peasant who acquired land/farm via marriage (przyżeniony) or "successor"/"heir". Notable people with the surname include:

- Andrzej Stępień (born 1953), Polish Olympic athlete
- Bill Stepien (born 1978), American political consultant
- Karol Herman Stępień (1910–1943), Polish Roman Catholic martyr
- Marek Stępień (born 1964), Polish fencer
- Mariusz Stepien (born 1976), metal detector enthusiast in Scotland
- Piotr Stępień (born 1963), Polish wrestler
- Ted Stepien (1925–2007), American sports team owner
- Władysław Stępień (born 1946), Polish politician
- Włodzimierz Stępień (born 1952), Polish politician

== See also ==
- Septién, a surname
- Stempeniu
- Stepien (disambiguation)
