= Tomczyk =

Tomczyk is a Polish surname. It may refer to:

- Dominik Tomczyk (born 1974), Polish basketball player
- Łukasz Tomczyk (born 1988), Polish football manager
- Martin Tomczyk (born 1981), German racing driver
- Michael Tomczyk, computing pioneer
- Paweł Tomczyk (born 1998), Polish footballer
- Ryszard Tomczyk (born 1959), Polish politician and historian
- Ryszard Tomczyk (boxer), Polish boxer
- Stanisława Tomczyk, Polish Spiritualist medium
