= Jędrusik =

Jędrusik is a Polish surname. Notable people with the surname include:

- Kalina Jędrusik (1930–1991), Polish singer and actress
- Tomasz Jędrusik (born 1969), Polish athlete
- Wiesław Jędrusik (born 1945), Polish politician
