= Czerniec =

Czerniec may refer to the following places in Poland:

- Czerniec, Lower Silesian Voivodeship (south-west Poland)
- Czerniec, Lesser Poland Voivodeship (south Poland)
- Czerniec, Pomeranian Voivodeship (north Poland)
