= Stepien =

Stepien or Stępień may refer to:

- Stępień (surname)
- Stępień, Warmian-Masurian Voivodeship, a village in Poland
- Stępień, West Pomeranian Voivodeship, a village in Poland

== See also ==
- Septién, a surname
- Stempeniu
