= Czarny Potok, Lesser Poland Voivodeship =

Czarny Potok
- Village
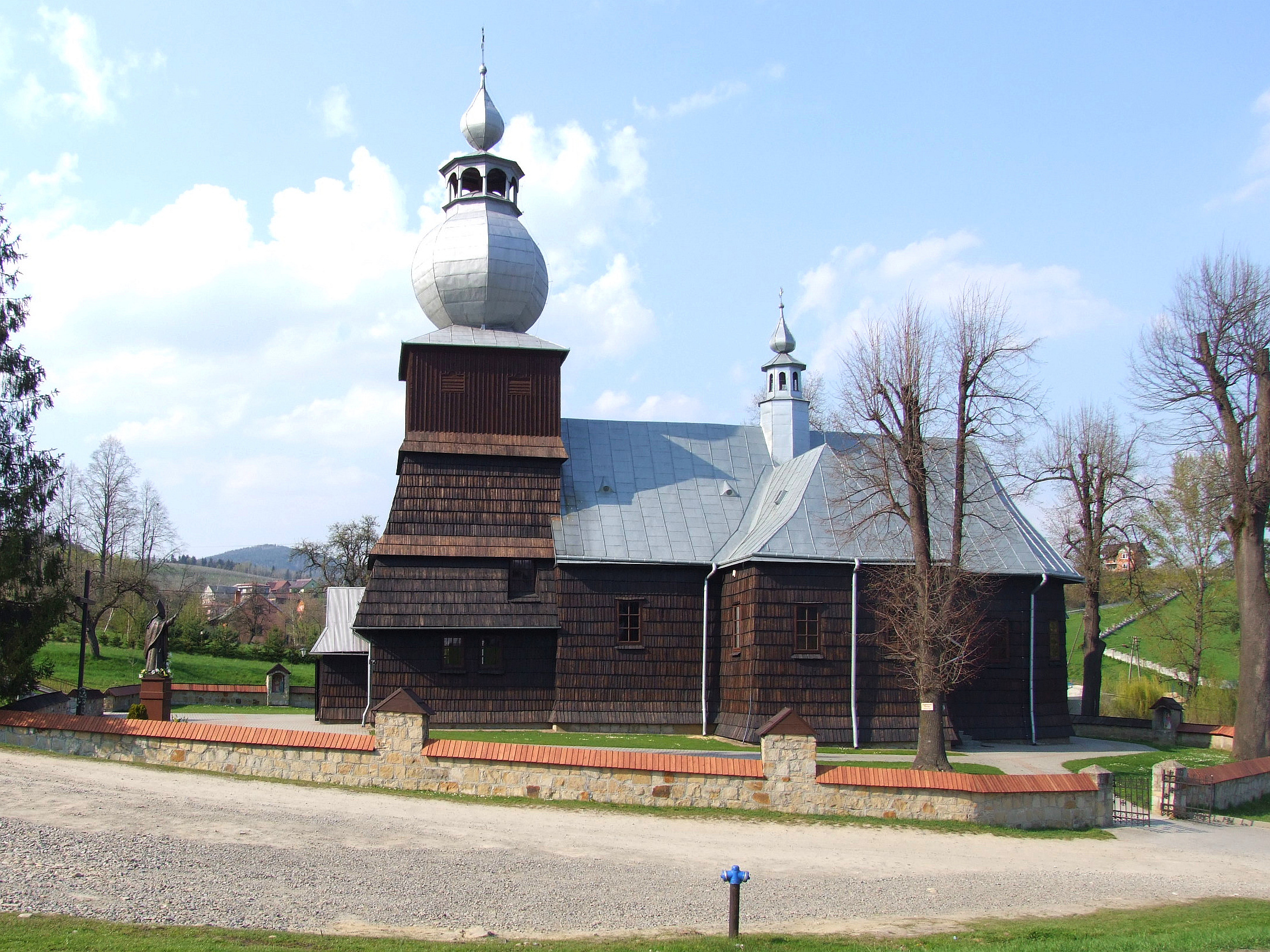
- Church

- Location within Poland
- Coordinates: 49°35′N 20°29′E
- Country: Poland
- Voivodeship: Lesser Poland
- County: Nowy Sącz
- Gmina: Łącko
- Population (approx.): 666 (2,020 forecast)

Czarny Potok [ˈt͡ʂarnɨ ˈpɔtɔk] is a village in the administrative district of Gmina Łącko, within Nowy Sącz County, Lesser Poland Voivodeship, in southern Poland.

The village has an approximate population of 666.
