= Kadcza =

- Village
- Location within Poland
- Coordinates: 49°32′5.14″N 20°32′37.02″E
- Country: Poland
- Voivodeship: Lesser Poland
- County: Nowy Sącz
- Gmina: Łącko
- Elevation: 330 m (1,080 ft)

Kadcza [ˈkatt͡ʂa] is a village in the administrative district of Gmina Łącko, within Nowy Sącz County, Lesser Poland Voivodeship, in southern Poland.
