= Wola Kosnowa =

- Village
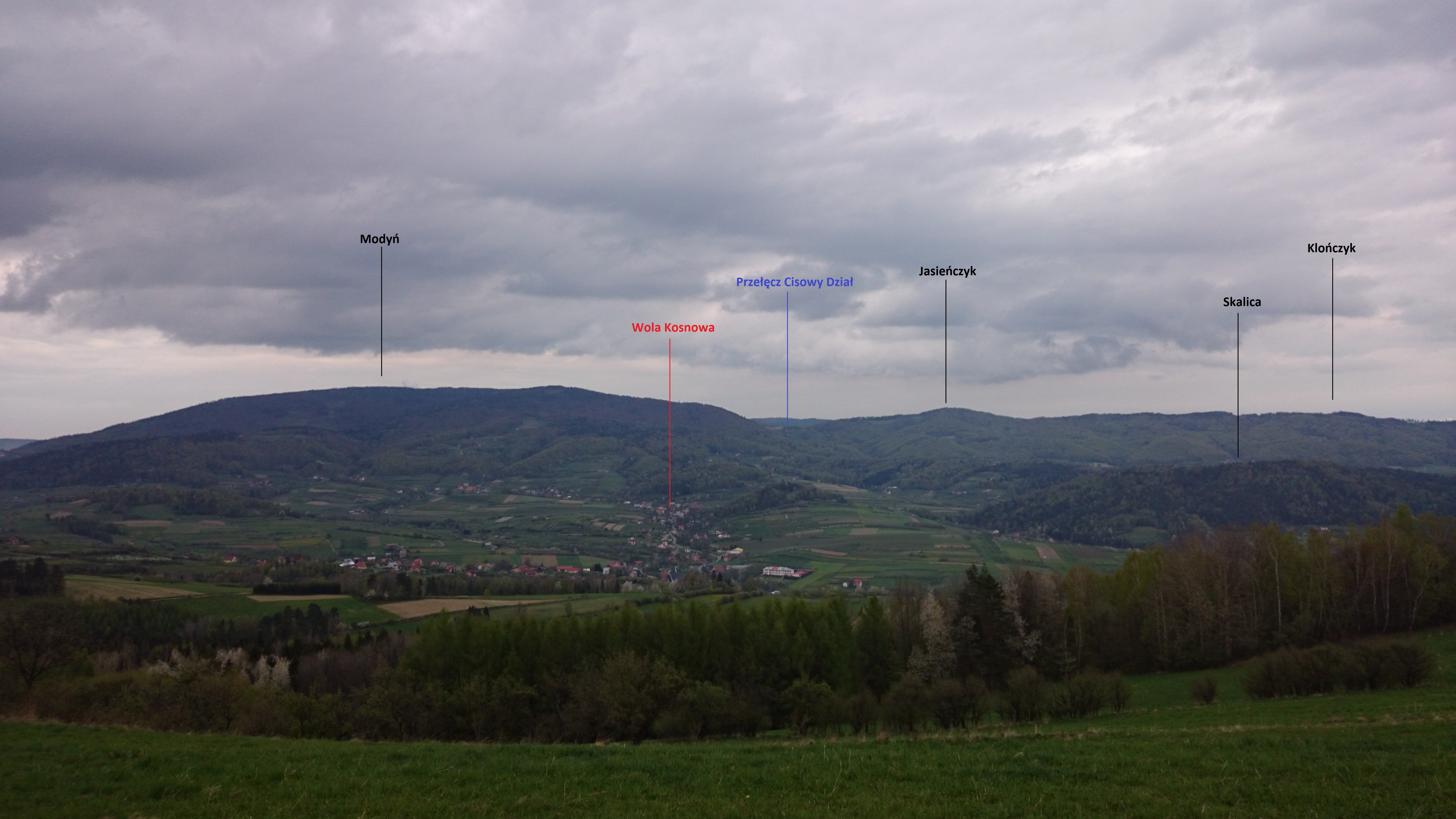

- Location within Poland
- Coordinates: 49°35′35″N 20°23′14″E
- Country: Poland
- Voivodeship: Lesser Poland
- County: Nowy Sącz
- Gmina: Łącko
- Time zone: UTC+1 (CET)
  - Summer (DST): UTC+2 (CEST)
- Vehicle registration: KNS

Wola Kosnowa [ˈvɔla kɔsˈnɔva] is a village in the administrative district of Gmina Łącko, within Nowy Sącz County, Lesser Poland Voivodeship, in southern Poland.

== History ==
Following the German-Soviet invasion of Poland, which started World War II in September 1939, the village was occupied by Germany until 1945. The Polish resistance was present in the area. In 1944 the Peasant Battalions seized grain from a local storehouse as part of a nationwide effort to prevent the Germans from shipping food out of Poland.
