= Obidza =

- Village
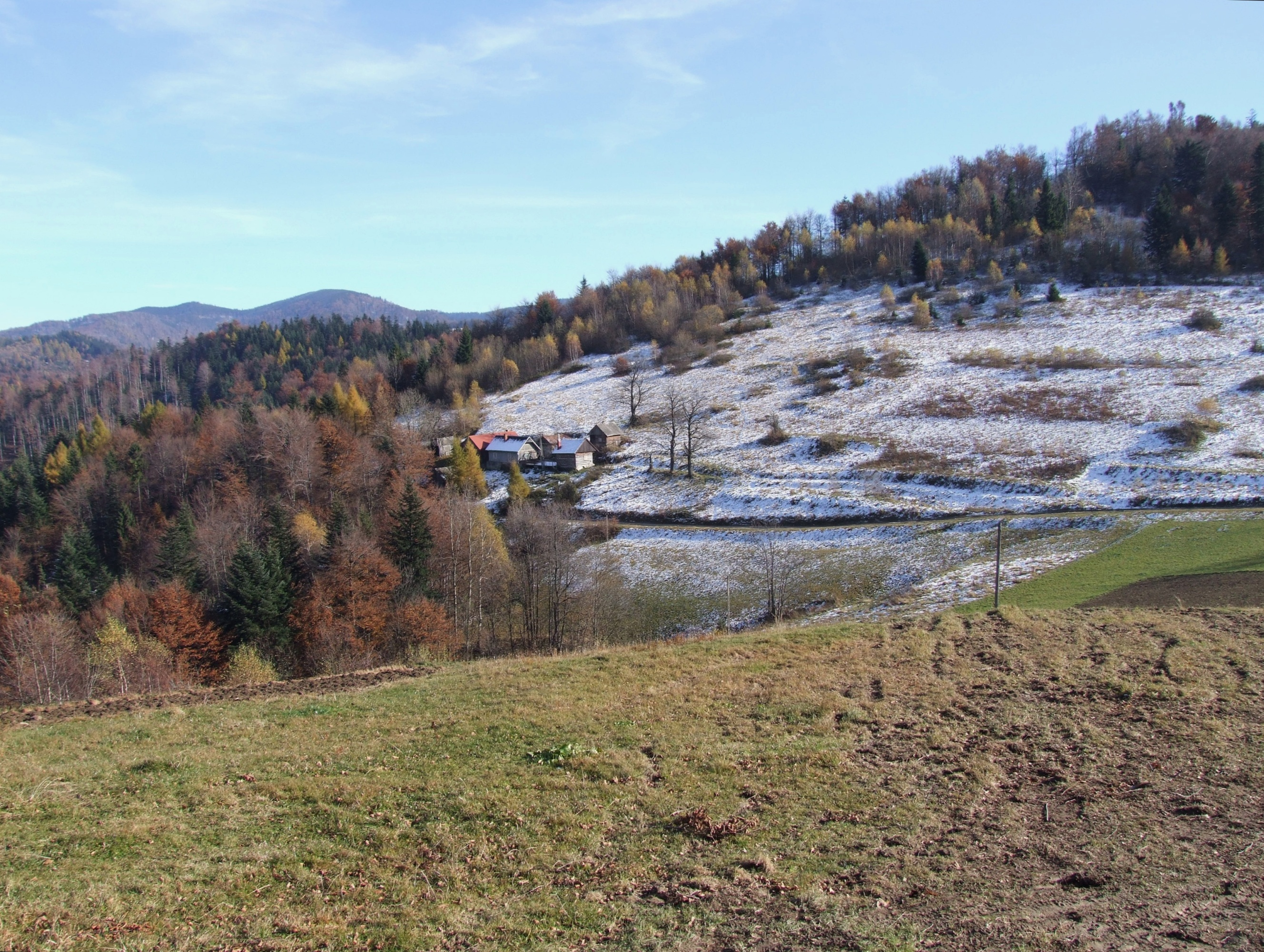

- Location within Poland
- Coordinates: 49°31′N 20°31′E
- Country: Poland
- Voivodeship: Lesser Poland
- County: Nowy Sącz
- Gmina: Łącko
- Population: 1,400

Obidza [ɔˈbʲid͡za] is a village in the administrative district of Gmina Łącko, within Nowy Sącz County, Lesser Poland Voivodeship, in southern Poland.
