= Zagorzyn, Lesser Poland Voivodeship =

Zagorzyn
- Village
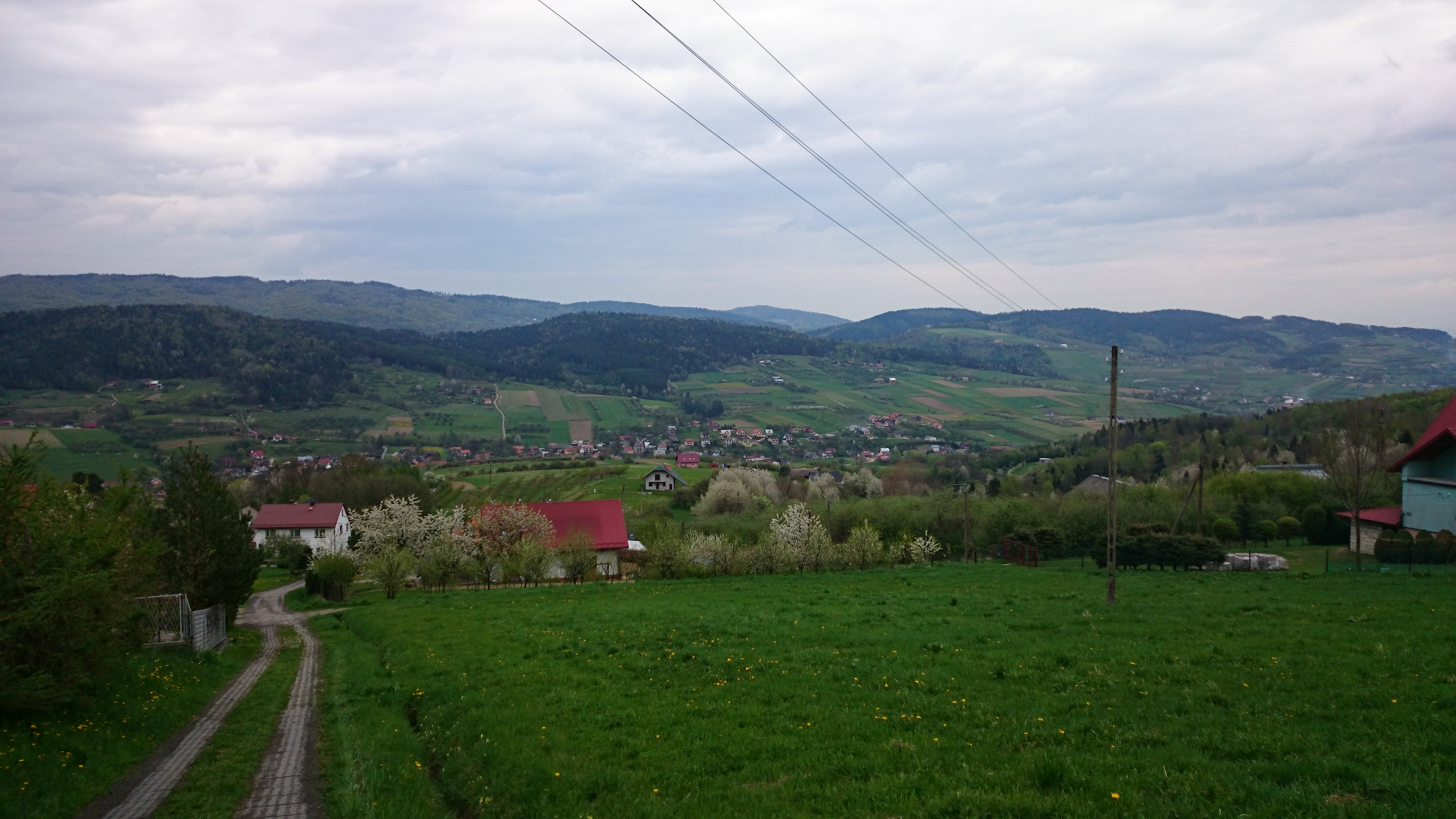

- Location within Poland
- Coordinates: 49°34′40″N 20°24′27″E
- Country: Poland
- Voivodeship: Lesser Poland
- County: Nowy Sącz
- Gmina: Łącko
- Population: 860

Zagorzyn [zaˈɡɔʐɨn] is a village in the administrative district of Gmina Łącko, within Nowy Sącz County, Lesser Poland Voivodeship, in southern Poland.
