= Gmina Łącko =

Gmina Łącko Łącko Commune
- Gmina
- Flag Coat of arms
- Interactive map of Gmina Łącko
- Coordinates (Łącko): 49°33′30″N 20°26′6″E
- Country: Poland
- Voivodeship: Lesser Poland
- County: Nowy Sącz County
- Seat: Łącko

Area
  - Total: 132.95 km^{2} (51.33 sq mi)

Population (2006)
  - Total: 14,835
  - Density: 111.58/km^{2} (289.00/sq mi)
- Website: http://www.lacko.sacz.pl

Gmina Łącko is a rural gmina (administrative district) in Nowy Sącz County, Lesser Poland Voivodeship, in southern Poland. Its seat is the village of Łącko, which lies approximately 21 kilometres (13 mi) west of Nowy Sącz and 67 km (42 mi) south-east of the regional capital Kraków. It roughly corresponds to the White Goral region.

The gmina covers an area of 132.95 square kilometres (51.3 sq mi), and as of 2006 its total population is 14,835.

== Villages ==
Gmina Łącko contains the villages and settlements of Brzyna, Czarny Potok, Czerniec, Jazowsko, Kadcza, Kicznia, Łącko, Łazy Brzyńskie, Maszkowice, Obidza, Szczereż, Wola Kosnowa, Wola Piskulina, Zabrzeż, Zagorzyn and Zarzecze.

== Neighbouring gminas ==
Gmina Łącko is bordered by the town of Szczawnica and by the gminas of Kamienica, Krościenko nad Dunajcem, Łukowica, Ochotnica Dolna, Podegrodzie and Stary Sącz.
