= Stanisław Stec =

Polish politician (born 1941)

member of Sejm 2005-2007
- In office 14 October 1993 – 7 November 2011

Personal details
- Born: 22 March 1941 (age 85)
- Party: Democratic Left Alliance

Stanisław Stec (pronounced [staˈniswaf ˈstɛt͡s]; born 22 March 1941 in Jazowsko) is a Polish politician. He was elected to Sejm on 25 September 2005, getting 9944 votes in 38 Piła district as a candidate from Democratic Left Alliance list.

He was also a member of Sejm 1993-1997, Sejm 1997-2001, and Sejm 2001-2005.

== See also ==
- Members of Polish Sejm 2005-2007
