= Brzyna =

- Village
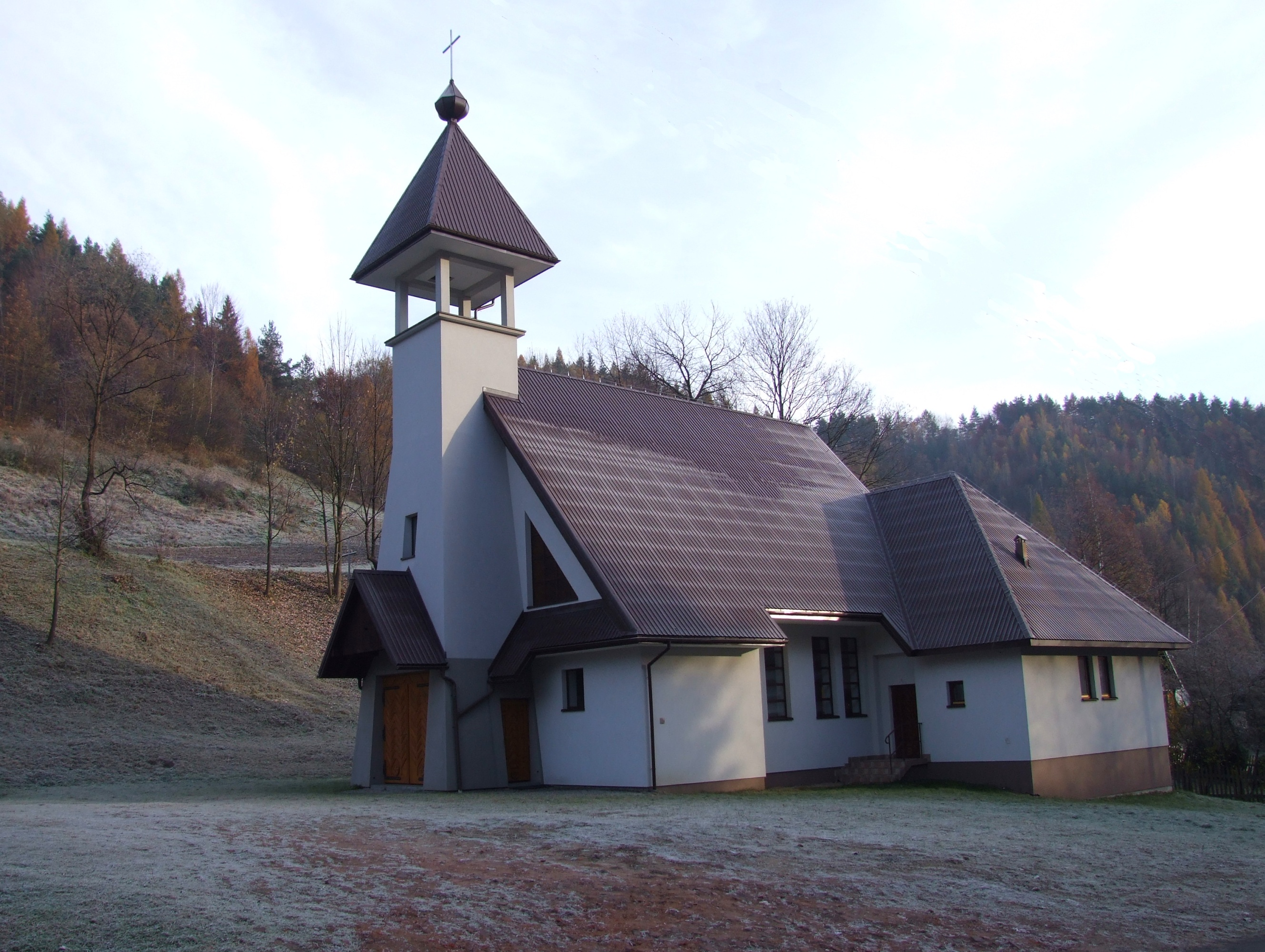
- Catholic church

- Location within Poland
- Coordinates: 49°32′N 20°30′E
- Country: Poland
- Voivodeship: Lesser Poland
- County: Nowy Sącz
- Gmina: Łącko
- Population: 740

Brzyna [ˈbʐɨna] is a village in the administrative district of Gmina Łącko, within Nowy Sącz County, Lesser Poland Voivodeship, in southern Poland.
