= Szczereż =

- Village
- Location within Poland
- Coordinates: 49°35′N 20°30′E
- Country: Poland
- Voivodeship: Lesser Poland
- County: Nowy Sącz
- Gmina: Łącko

Szczereż [ˈʂt͡ʂɛrɛʂ] is a village in the administrative district of Gmina Łącko, within Nowy Sącz County, Lesser Poland Voivodeship, in southern Poland.
