= Łazy Brzyńskie =

- Village
- Location within Poland
- Coordinates: 49°32′N 20°32′E
- Country: Poland
- Voivodeship: Lesser Poland
- County: Nowy Sącz
- Gmina: Łącko

Łazy Brzyńskie [ˈwazɨ ˈbʐɨɲskʲɛ] is a village in the administrative district of Gmina Łącko, within Nowy Sącz County, Lesser Poland Voivodeship, in southern Poland.
