= Zabrzeż =

- Village
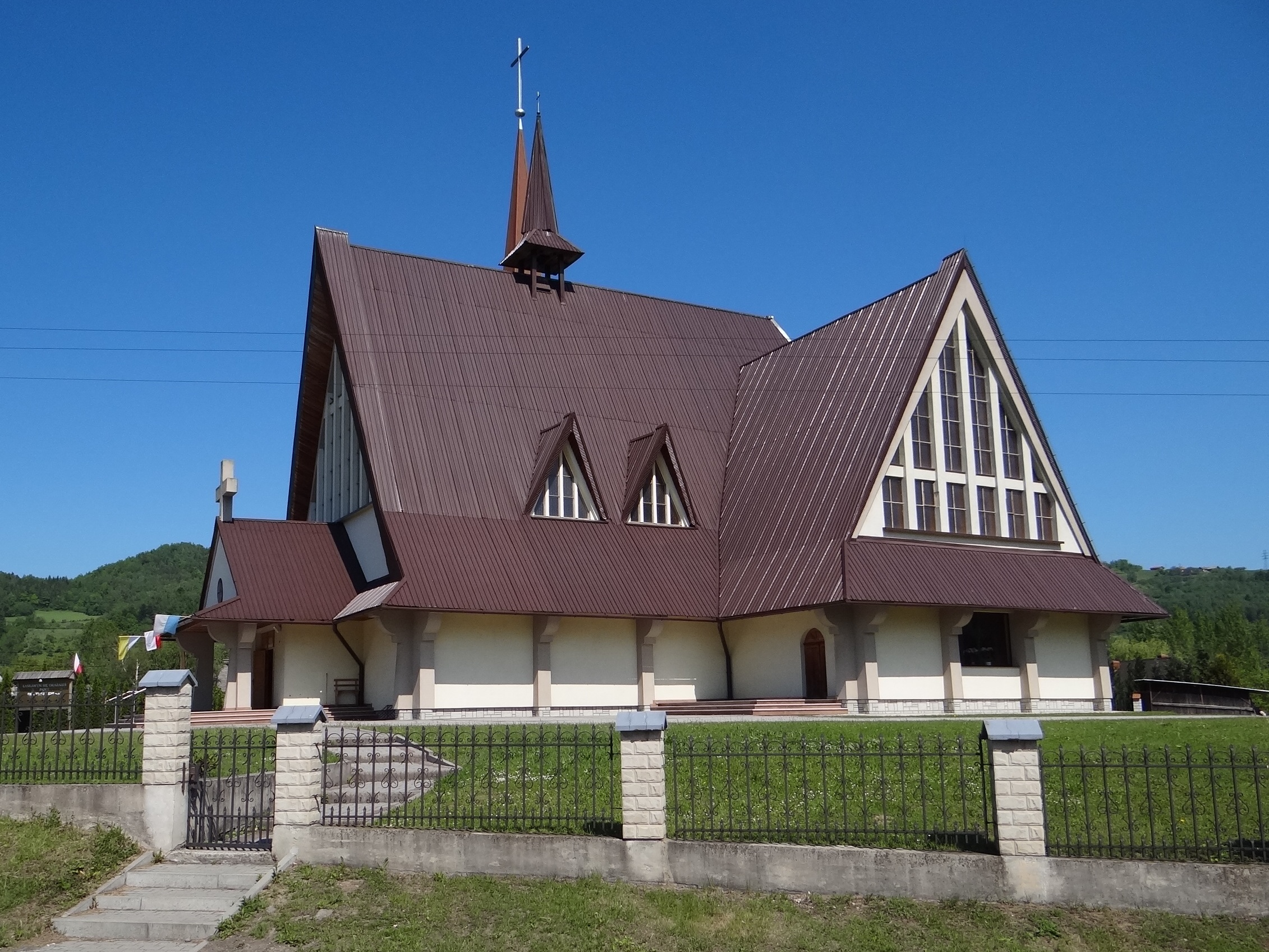

- Location within Poland
- Coordinates: 49°32′37″N 20°23′44″E
- Country: Poland
- Voivodeship: Lesser Poland
- County: Nowy Sącz
- Gmina: Łącko
- Population: 1,100

Zabrzeż [ˈzabʐɛʂ] is a village in the administrative district of Gmina Łącko, within Nowy Sącz County, Lesser Poland Voivodeship, in southern Poland.
