= Grzegorz Woźny =

Polish politician (born 1946)

member of Sejm 2005-2007
- In office 25 September 2005 – 2007

Personal details
- Born: 1946 (age 79–80)
- Party: Democratic Left Alliance

Grzegorz Marian Woźny (pronounced [ˈɡʐɛɡɔʂ ˈvɔʑnɨ], born 19 July 1946 in Pudliszki), is a Polish politician. He was elected to the Sejm on 25 September 2005, getting 9178 votes in 36 the Kalisz district as a candidate from the Democratic Left Alliance list.

He was also a member of the Senate 1993-1997, the Sejm 1997-2001 and the Sejm 2001-2005.

== See also ==
- Members of Polish Sejm 2005-2007
