= Szczepan Skomra =

Polish politician (born 1949)

member of Sejm 2005-2007
- In office 14 October 1993 – 4 November 2007

Personal details
- Born: 1949 (age 76–77)
- Party: Democratic Left Alliance

Szczepan Stanisław Skomra (born 12 August 1949 in Wysoka) is a Polish politician. He was elected to the Sejm on 25 September 2005, getting 6348 votes in 7 Chełm district as a candidate from the Democratic Left Alliance list.

He was also a member of Sejm 1993-1997, Sejm 1997-2001, and Sejm 2001-2005.

== See also ==
- Members of Polish Sejm 2005-2007
