= Elżbieta Jankowska =

Polish politician (born 1952)

member of Sejm 2005–2007
- In office 19 October 2001 – 4 November 2007

Personal details
- Born: 1952 (age 73–74)
- Party: Democratic Left Alliance

Elżbieta Róża Jankowska (born 1 August 1952) is a Polish political figure who served in the national Parliament (Sejm) from September 2001 to November 2007.

A native of Łódź, Poland's second-largest city (since 1998, third-largest), Elżbieta Jankowska was elected as a member of the Democratic Left Alliance in the election of 2001, serving in the Sejm until the election of 2005, when she was re-elected from Łódź district 9 with 7495 votes. She lost her seat in the election of November 2007.

== See also ==
- Members of Polish Sejm 2005–2007
