= Sylwester Pawłowski =

Polish politician

Member of the Sejm
- In office 18 October 2005 – 7 November 2011
- Constituency: 9 – Łódź

Personal details
- Born: 1958 (age 67–68)
- Party: Democratic Left Alliance

Sylwester Stefan Pawłowski (born 13 September 1958 in Łódź) is a Polish politician. He was elected to the Sejm on 25 September 2005, getting 12469 votes in 9 Łódź district as a candidate from the Democratic Left Alliance list.

== See also ==
- Members of Polish Sejm 2005-2007
