= Zbigniew Podraza =

Polish politician

Zbigniew Marian Podraza

member of Sejm 2005-2007
- In office 19 October 2001 – 2006

Personal details
- Born: 1953 (age 72–73)
- Party: Democratic Left Alliance

Zbigniew Marian Podraza (born 2 December 1953 in Sosnowiec) is a Polish politician. He was the mayor of Dąbrowa Górnicza. He was also a member of the Sejm 2001-2005. He was elected to the Sejm on 25 September 2005, getting 5363 votes in 32 Sosnowiec district as a candidate from Democratic Left Alliance list.

== See also ==
- Members of Polish Sejm 2005-2007
