= Zenon Wiśniewski =

Polish politician

member of Sejm 2005-2007
- In office 25 September 2005 – 2007

Personal details
- Born: 1959 (age 66–67)
- Party: Samoobrona

Zenon Aleksandra Wiśniewski (born 22 December 1959 in Płock) is a Polish politician. He was elected to the Sejm on 25 September 2005, getting 5764 votes in 16 Płock district as a candidate from the Samoobrona Rzeczpospolitej Polskiej list.

== See also ==
- Members of Polish Sejm 2005-2007
