= Michał Tober =

Polish politician

Member of Sejm
- In office 19 October 2001 – 4 November 2007

Personal details
- Born: 10 April 1975 (age 50) Warsaw, Poland
- Party: Democratic Left Alliance

Michał Tober (born 10 April 1975) is a Polish politician. He was elected to Sejm on 25 September 2005, getting 8945 votes in 20 Warsaw district as a candidate from Democratic Left Alliance list.

He was also a member of Sejm 2001-2005. He used to serve as a spokesman of Leszek Miller - Polish Prime Minister until 2004. Once Miller has resigned, and the MP post was taken by Marek Belka, Tober was excluded from the MP office members.

During his appointment as a spokesman of the MP, Tober was involved in the creation of a media legislation bill. His work was not appreciated by media experts, as his experience as a lawyer and media expert was that times minor.

== See also ==
- Members of Polish Sejm 2005-2007
