= Septién =

Septién is a surname. Notable people with the name include:

- Carlos Septién (footballer), Mexican footballer
- Rafael Septién (born 1953), Mexican-born player of American football

== See also ==
- Stępień (surname), includes a list of people with surname Stępień
