= Czerniec, Lesser Poland Voivodeship =

Czerniec
- Village
- Location within Poland
- Coordinates: 49°33′39″N 20°24′32″E
- Country: Poland
- Voivodeship: Lesser Poland
- County: Nowy Sącz
- Gmina: Łącko

Czerniec [ˈt͡ʂɛrɲɛt͡s] is a village in the administrative district of Gmina Łącko, within Nowy Sącz County, Lesser Poland Voivodeship, in southern Poland.
