= Sławomir Jeneralski =

Polish journalist and politician

member of Sejm 2005-2007
- In office 25 September 2005 – ?

Personal details
- Born: 1961 (age 64–65)
- Party: Democratic Left Alliance

Sławomir Bogusław Jeneralski (born 28 July 1961 in Bydgoszcz) is a Polish journalist and politician. He was elected to the Sejm on 25 September 2005, getting 4,343 votes in 4 Bydgoszcz district as a candidate from the Democratic Left Alliance list.

== See also ==
- Members of Polish Sejm 2005-2007
