= Hermanovce nad Topľou =

- Municipality
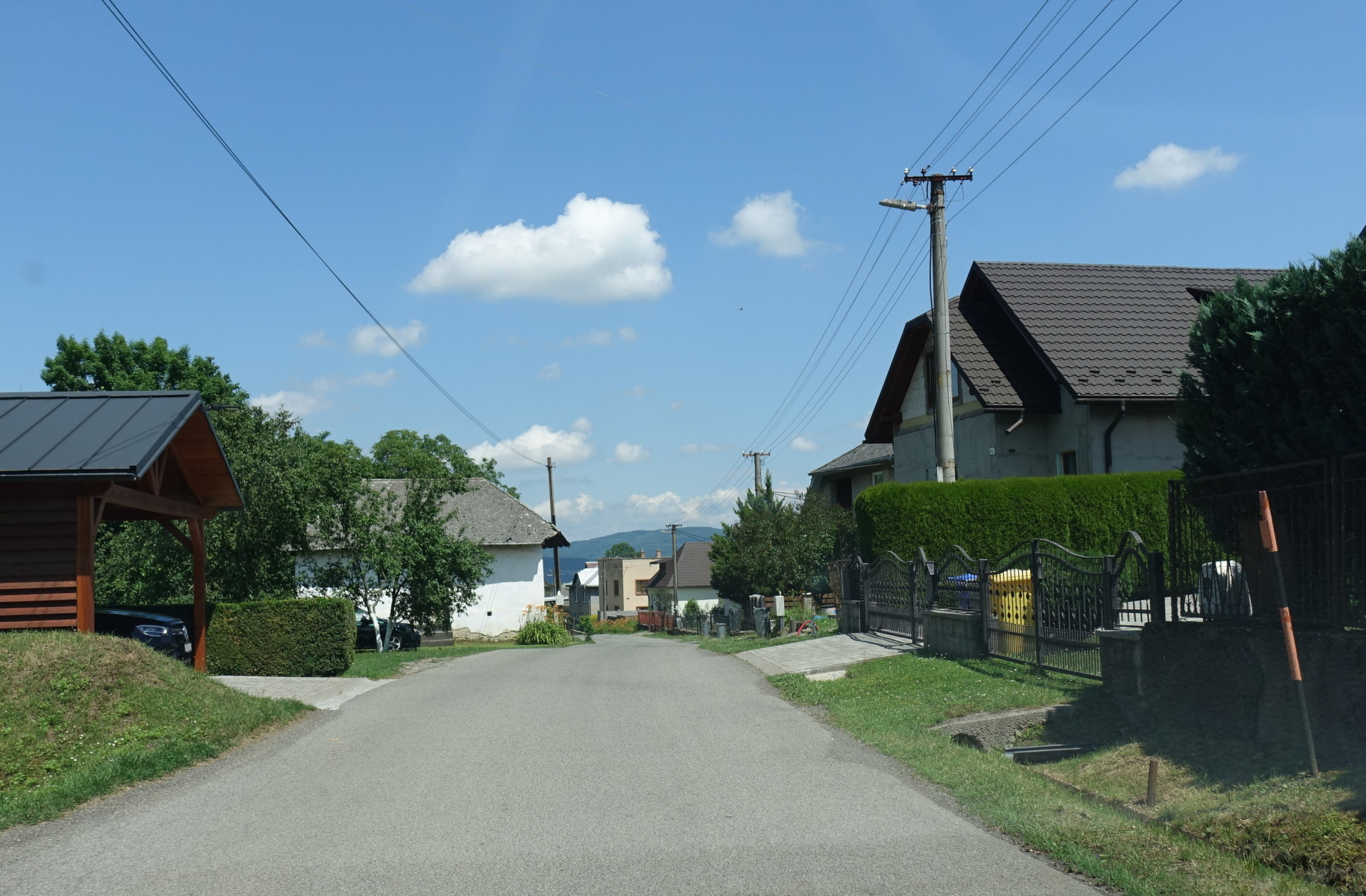

- Flag

- Location of Hermanovce nad Topľou in the Prešov Region Location of Hermanovce nad Topľou in Slovakia
- Coordinates: 48.97°N 21.51°E
- Country: Slovakia
- Region: Prešov Region
- District: Vranov nad Topľou District
- First mentioned: 1402

Area
  - Total: 25.93 km^{2} (10.01 sq mi)
- Elevation: 295 m (968 ft)

Population (2025)
  - Total: 664
- Time zone: UTC+1 (CET)
  - Summer (DST): UTC+2 (CEST)
- Postal code: 943 4
- Area code: +421 57
- Vehicle registration plate (until 2022): VT
- Website: www.hermanovcent.sk

Hermanovce nad Topľou (Hungarian: Tapolyhermány) is a village and municipality in Vranov nad Topľou District in the Prešov Region of eastern Slovakia.

== History ==
In historical records the village was first mentioned in 1402.

== Geography ==
The municipality lies at an altitude of 295 metres (968 ft) and covers an area of 25.93 km^{2} (10.01 sq mi) (2025).

== Population ==
Population statistic (10 years)
Year	1995	2005	2015	2025
Count	622	695	714	664
Difference		+11.73%	+2.73%	−7.00%

Population statistic
Year	2024	2025
Count	662	664
Difference		+0.30%

It has a population of 664 people (31 December 2025).

=== Ethnicity ===
Census 2021 (1+ %)
Ethnicity	Number	Fraction
Slovak	670	97.38%
Not found out	14	2.03%
Total	688	

In year 2021 was 688 people by ethnicity 670 as Slovak, 14 as Not found out, 5 as Czech, 4 as Rusyn, 3 as Other, 1 as Jewish, 1 as Romani and 1 as Romanian.

Note on population: The difference values of population numbers in the table "Population statistic" and in the sections "Ethnicity" & "Religion" is caused by the use of various statistical methods.

=== Religion ===
Census 2021 (1+ %)
Religion	Number	Fraction
Evangelical Church	362	52.62%
Roman Catholic Church	207	30.09%
Church of the Brethren	59	8.58%
Greek Catholic Church	17	2.47%
Not found out	13	1.89%
None	10	1.45%
Apostolic Church	9	1.31%
Other and not ascertained christian church	8	1.16%
Total	688	

In year 2021 was 688 people by religion 362 from Evangelical Church, 207 from Roman Catholic Church, 59 from Church of the Brethren, 17 from Greek Catholic Church, 13 from Not found out, 10 from None, 9 from Apostolic Church, 8 from Other and not ascertained christian church, 2 from Jehovah's Witnesses and 1 from Eastern Orthodox Church.

== Genealogical resources ==
The records for genealogical research are available at the state archive "Statny Archiv in Presov, Slovakia"

- Roman Catholic church records (births/marriages/deaths): 1853-1910 (parish B)
- Greek Catholic church records (births/marriages/deaths): 1852-1940 (parish B)
- Lutheran church records (births/marriages/deaths): 1810-1896 (parish B)

== See also ==
- List of municipalities and towns in Slovakia
