= Włodzimierz Stępień =

Polish politician (born 1952)

member of Sejm 2005-2007
- In office 18 October 2005 – 4 November 2007

Personal details
- Born: 1952 (age 73–74)
- Party: Democratic Left Alliance

Włodzimierz Tadeusz Stępień (born 24 October 1952 in Kielce) is a Polish politician. He was elected to the Sejm on 25 September 2005, getting 12655 votes in 33 Kielce district as a candidate from Democratic Left Alliance list.

== See also ==
- Members of Polish Sejm 2005-2007
