= Jazowsko =

- Village
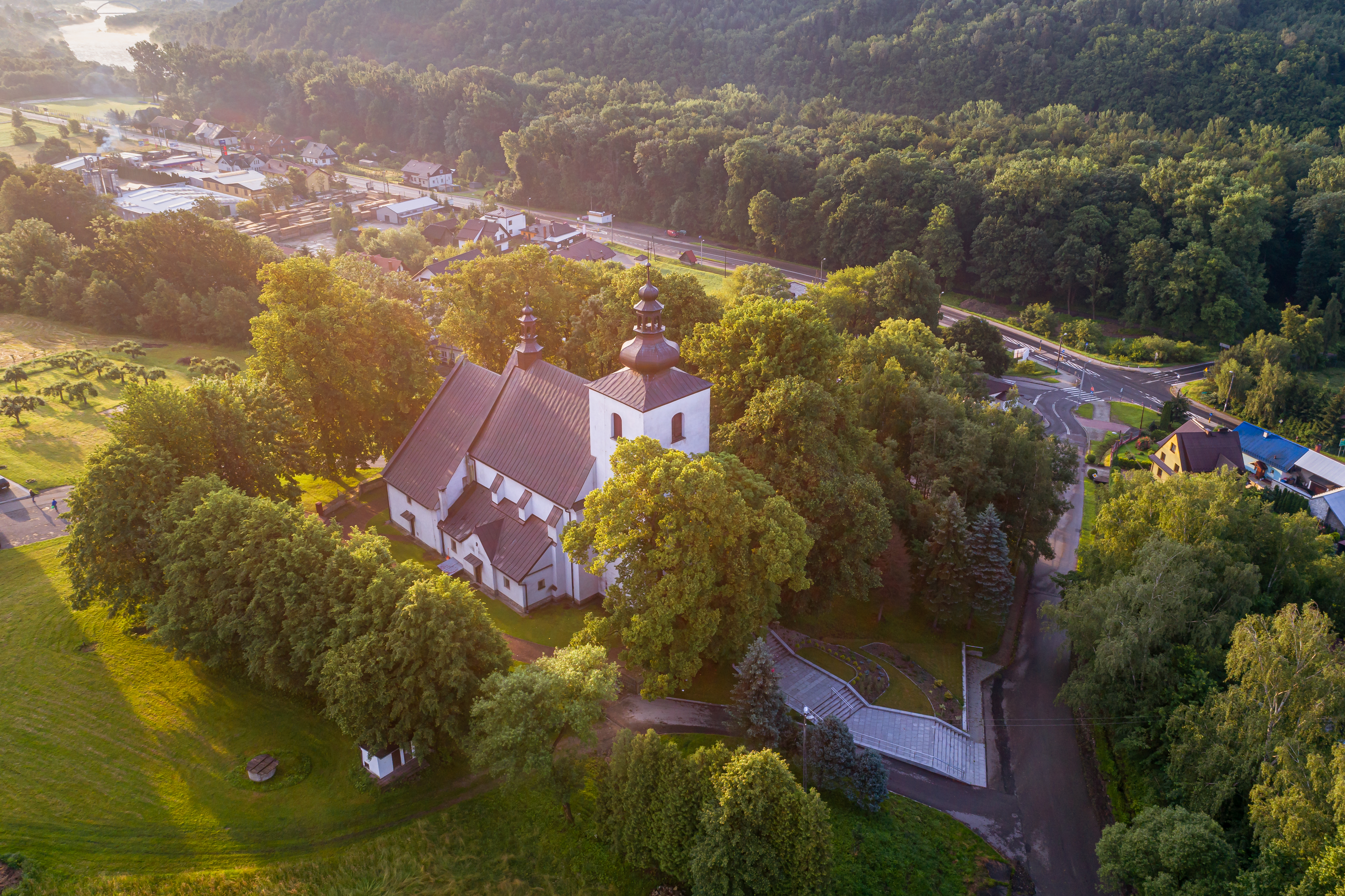

- Location within Poland
- Coordinates: 49°30′N 20°30′E
- Country: Poland
- Voivodeship: Lesser Poland
- County: Nowy Sącz
- Gmina: Łącko
- Elevation: 340 m (1,120 ft)
- Population: 1,512

Jazowsko [jaˈzɔfskɔ] is a village in the administrative district of Gmina Łącko, within Nowy Sącz County, Lesser Poland Voivodeship, in southern Poland.
