= Ryszard Tomczyk =

Polish historian, politician (born 1959)

Member of Sejm
- In office 29 July 2003 – 18 October 2005

Personal details
- Born: 17 August 1959 (age 67) Bierzwnik, Choszczno County
- Party: Democratic Left Alliance
- Education: University of Szczecin

Ryszard Władysław Tomczyk (born in Bierzwnik, Poland, on August 17, 1959) is a Polish politician, a historian, and a member of Local government.

== Biography ==
Ryszard Tomczyk graduated from the University of Szczecin in 1983. Having received his doctorate, he was appointed associate professor at that university. In 2008, he defended his habilitation thesis at the Rzeszów University, and now he is a professor extraordinarius at the universities of Szczecin and of Rzeszów. He focuses on Ukrainian history, international relations in the Baltic states, and local government. During the period of 2002-2003 Ryszard Tomczyk was an alderman of West Pomeranian Voivodeship.In the years 2003–2005 he was a member of the Polish parliament

== Selected publications ==
- Ukraińskie Zjednoczenie Narodowo-Demokratyczne 1925–1939, Książnica Pomorska, Szczecin 2006 ISBN 83-87879-60-6
- Galicyjska Rusko-Ukraińska Partia Radykalna w latach 1890–1914, Szczecin 2007
- Radykałowie i socjaldemokraci. Miejsce i rola lewicy w ukraińskim obozie narodowym w Galicji 1890–1914, Szczecin 2007
- Socjaldemokraci ukraińscy i polscy. Z dziejów współpracy, Warszawa 2007
- Ukraińska Partia Radykalna w II Rzeczypospolitej 1918–1926, Szczecin 2007
- Myśl Mocarstwowa. Z dziejów młodego pokolenia II Rzeczypospolitej, Szczecin 2008
- Między Wiedniem a Lwowem. Szkice z historii administracji w Austrii, Szczecin 2010
- Urzędnicy cywilni w Austrii 1740–1918. Studia z historii prawa i administracji, Szczecin 2012.
- "Zmiany w nauczaniu prawa w monarchii habsburskiej. Początki wykładu uniwersyteckiego z historii prawa austriackiego". Edukacja Humanistyczna. 2014. pp. 73–88. ISSN 1507-4943.
- Cmentarz Janowski we Lwowie. Polskie dziedzictwo narodowe (współautor Barbara Patlewicz), t. I–II, Szczecin 2017.
