= Władysław Stępień =

Polish politician (born 1946)

member of Sejm 2005–2007
- In office 14 October 1993 – 4 November 2007

Personal details
- Born: 24 October 1946 (age 79)
- Party: Democratic Left Alliance

Władysław Piotr Stępień (born 24 October 1946 in Wrzawy) is a Polish politician. He was elected to the Sejm on 25 September 2005, getting 10505 votes in 23 Rzeszów district as a candidate from the Democratic Left Alliance list.

He was also a member of Sejm 1993–1997, Sejm 1997–2001, and Sejm 2001–2005.

== See also ==
- Members of Polish Sejm 2005–2007
