= Wiesław Jędrusik =

Polish politician (born 1945)

member of Sejm 2005-2007
- In office 19 October 2001 – 4 November 2007

Personal details
- Born: 1945 (age 80–81)
- Party: Democratic Left Alliance

Wiesław Leszek Jędrusik (born 27 November 1945 in Dąbrowa Górnicza) is a Polish politician. He was elected to the Sejm on 25 September 2005, getting 9761 votes in 32 Sosnowiec district as a candidate from the Democratic Left Alliance list.

He was also a member of Sejm 2001-2005.

== See also ==
- Members of Polish Sejm 2005-2007
