= People's National Movement (Poland) =

People's National Movement Ruch Ludowo-Narodowy
- Abbreviation: RLN
- Leader: Jan Bestry
- Founded: 22 September 2006
- Dissolved: 30 November 2006
- Split from: SRP and LPR
- Merged into: PiS
- Membership (2006): 15
- Ideology: National agrarianism Anti-neoliberalism; Solidarism
- Political position: Centre
- Colours: Green; Cerulean; Red; White
- Sejm: 0 / 460
- Senate: 0 / 100
- European Parliament: 0 / 51
- Regional assemblies: 0 / 552
- City presidents: 0 / 117

People's National Movement (Polish: Ruch Ludowo-Narodowy, RLN) was a parliamentary group in the 5th legislature (2005–2007) of Sejm of the Republic of Poland. It was founded on 22 September 2006 by former MPs of Self-Defence of the Republic of Poland (Polish: Samoobrona Rzeczpospolitej Polskiej, SRP) and League of Polish Families (Polish: Liga Polskich Rodzin, LPR) and was a response to both parties distancing themselves from Law and Justice, which they considered breaking their coalition agreement with (the coalition was dissolved in 2007). The goal of the People's National Movement was to keep the coalition with Law and Justice at any cost.

As the split further deepended divisions between left-wing populist Self-Defence, National-Catholic League of Polish Families and right-wing populist Law and Justice, the People's National Movement attempted to enter the PiS-SRP-LPR coalition as its fourth member. Once that proposal proved unable to be agreed upon, the group then tried to form an alliance directly with Law and Justice, envisioning to become a minor parent of the party akin to Christian Social Union in Bavaria and its union with the Christian Democratic Union of Germany. In the end, the group was dissolved on 30 November 2006, less than three months after its formation, and all of its members joined Law and Justice.

== Origin ==
The name of the party comes from a concept that Andrzej Lepper, the leader of Self-Defence of the Republic of Poland, formulated between 1999 and 2000, called "The People's National Bloc" (Polish: Blok Ludowo-Narodowy). This political bloc was to become a permanent formula for cooperation of all parties united by their opposition to neoliberalism, particularly the reforms of Leszek Balcerowicz and Jerzy Buzek that privatized state industries, abolished regulations, slashed the socialist welfare state, and removed trade protections - something that Samoobrona decried as "socio-economic satanism" and "economic genocide", citing the spike in inflation, unemployment and death rates caused by these reforms. However, Samoobrona is explicitly socialist and not only sympathises with the former People's Republic of Poland, but openly identifies with its communist form of society and socialist ideals. This bloc was to include Samoobrona as well as agrarian Polish People's Party (back then agrarian socialist), and also Polish Labour Party - August 80 once it was founded. However, this plan did not come to fruition as Polish People's Party refused to cooperate with Samoobrona, despite Lepper offering concessions such as ceding leading electoral list positions.

Despite its far-left position, Samoobrona would then inch closer to the far-right League of Polish Families, given that both parties were bitterly opposed to the further privatization plans proposed and carried out by the government. This gave rise to the offer of 'reactivating' the concept of People's National Bloc, which would include Samoobrona and League of Polish Families, along with dissident politicians of Polish People's Party who questioned the pro-government position of Jarosław Kalinowski. Shortly before the 2002 Polish local elections, Lepper reached out to League of Polish Families and proposed a formal alliance that would work on the basis of anti-neoliberalism, despite the ideological differences of the party; however, this proposal was turned down.

This proposal was appeared one last time in 2004 following the 2004 European Parliament election in Poland, which saw both Samoobrona and League of Polish Families overperform. Samoobrona thus revived the idea of "People's National Agreement", which would once again consist of Samoobrona, League of Polish Families and Polish People's Party, and pursue a staunchly left-wing economic policy that would reverse the neoliberal reforms of previous reforms. This time, this scenario found agreement among the leadership of Polish People's Party, as Janusz Wojciechowski approved of such coalition and offered Samoobrona a local coalition in the Łódź Voivodeship Sejmik. Ultimately, all three parties underperformed in the 2005 Polish parliamentary election, which made the coalition impossible due to lack of majority, despite the will for cooperation between all three parties.

This proposal was directly replaced by the coalition between Samoobrona, League of Polish Families and (back then) Christian democrat Law and Justice; the founders of the People's National Movement took the name of their parliamentary group directly from The People's National Bloc concept of Samoobrona, and found it necessary to maintain the coalition at all cost, as they considered the only way to prevent another economically liberal government from taking power. Samoobrona, however, never referred to its 2005 coalition with League of Polish Families and Law and Justice as "People's National", and only kept this term as self-description from 2004, calling itself a "socialist-christian" and "people's national" party.

== History ==
People's National Movement was formed on 22 September 2006 by 15 MPs: 8 from Samoobrona RP, 5 from the League of Polish Families and 2 independent MPs (formerly in Law and Justice and the Civic Platform). The new formation included all MPs outside the main political parties except for the representatives of the German Minority Electoral Committee, a left-leaning Christian-democrat party representing Polish Germans. Jan Bestry was appointed chairman of the People's National Movement. The People's National Movement was in opposition to Andrzej Lepper breaking the coalition with Law and Justice.

The grouping was in talks to form a government coalition with PiS and LPR during the period when Samoobrona RP was not in it (from 22 September 2006 to 16 October 2006). On 13 October 2006, MPs Zygmunt Wrzodak and Marian Daszyk left the People's National Movement and rejoined Samoobrona, becoming the party's MPs once again. While this endangered the existence of the grouping (a minimum of 15 MPs were required), their places were subsequently taken by Piotr Cybulski, formerly a Civic Platform member, and Henryk Młynarczyk - a dissident Samoobrona RP MP.

The existence of the grouping and its attempt to maintain the coalition with Law and Justice prompted Jarosław Kaczyński, the leader of PiS, to further encourage defections from Samoobrona RP. Attempts to win support for Jarosław Kaczyński's government from successive Self-Defence MPs took the form of political corruption involving the Law and Justice party leaders in the persons of Adam Lipiński and Wojciech Mojzesowicz and, on the part of Samoobrona, Renata Beger. However, the public disclosure to the public of the behind-the-scenes activities of politicians effectively blocked the chances of winning majority support for the government in this way.

People's National Movement and its MPs led extensive negotiations and held talks to maintain the coalition between Samoobrona RP, League of Polish Families and Law and Justice in October and November 2006. One of the main proposals of the party was to reach its own agreement with Law and Justice that would make it formally enter the coalition as its 4th member, but this idea was rejected. Afterwards, the grouping promoted the concept of a 5-member grand coalition that would include not only Samoobrona RP, League of Polish Families, PiS and People's National Movement, but also the agrarian Polish People's Party. Leader of the People's National Movement, Jan Bestry, declared his readiness to negotiate with Samoobrona RP, arguing that it "may be difficult, but not impossible". Regarding PSL, Bestry declared that his formation is very close to PSL.

However, Andrzej Lepper ruled out a coalition that would include People's National Movement, as the grouping was compose of dissident MPs that abandoned his party. The formation criticized Lepper's decision and argued that talks with it were not only necessary, but also possible given the possible ideological closeness between it and Samoobrona RP. However, the coalition talks failed after Polish People's Party declared that it would not enter a coalition with Law and Justice, effectively rendering the grand coalition project impossible. The RLN blamed Samoobrona RP for the failure of negotiations, and accused it of preferring a coalition with left-wing parties instead.

Eventually, the grouping entered talks with Law and Justice to propose its sister party, with the leader of the grouping, Józef Cepil, stating: "We want to be for the Law and Justice Party what the CSU is for the CDU in our German neighbours." Law and Justice signed an agreement with the formation to maintain its parliamentary majority. However, instead of turning the grouping into its sister party, Law and Justice offered the MPs to dissolve the formation and join them. The grouping accepted the offer, and on 30 November 2006, the People's National Movement was dissolved and its MPs became members of Law and Justice.

== Electoral Committee ==
Prior to the 2006 local government elections, the People's national Movement Parliamentary Club submitted its own lists of candidates for local government in five provinces at commune and district level as the People's Christian Movement Electoral Committee. Jan Bestry became the election plenipotentiary of the committee. In elections to provincial assemblies, under an electoral agreement with the Law and Justice party (PiS), candidates of the People's National Movement took fifth places on the lists of the Law and Justice party. Among the grouping's candidates, only two candidates obtained councillor seats: Roman Marciniuk and Wiesław Ułasiuk (both on the municipal council of Olszanka, in the Łosice County, Mazowieckie Voivodeship). The best-known candidate of the grouping in this election was Piotr Misztal, a candidate for Mayor of Łódź, who came 4th out of 13 candidates, winning 8952 votes, i.e. 4.04%. In the second round, he gave his support to PiS candidate Jerzy Kropiwnicki, who was elected for a second term.

== Ideology ==
According to the grouping, it hoped to "become a base for national-agrarian minded people". It compared itself to the Christian Democratic Union of Germany and aspired to be a sister party of the right-wing populist Law and Justice. It described itself as closest to the agrarian Polish People's Party in terms of ideology and described the coalition with it, together with Law and Justice, Samoobrona RP and LPR as its ideal government.

It supported the proposal of League of Polish Families to modify the 38th article of the Polish constitution to include "legal protection of life", which would have implemented a constitutional ban on abortion. Economically, the People's National Movement called for a 'solidarist state', which it described as an economy where welfare benefits and economic development would serve the poorest and not the 'narrow elite'.

The ideological profile of the grouping was unclear given its mixed character and provisional organisation. Its close cooperation and eventual absorption by Law and Justice implies a right-leaning political position of the formation. However, conservative Radio Maryja criticized the grouping, arguing that despite its cooperation with Law and Justice, the presence of the conservative-nationalist current was marginal and its electoral list promoted 'liberal-leaning' candidates. The party's ideology was pragmatic and ultimately centrist, and followed general concepts such as nationalism, agrarianism, and opposition to economic liberalism and austerity.

According to Jan Bestry, the main goal of the People's National Movement was to help the farmers and support agrarianism. He accused Samoobrona RP of trying to breach the coalition with PiS in favour of one with Civic Platform and social-democratic Democratic Left Alliance, given the far-left character of Samoobrona.

== Presidents of the People's National Movement ==
- from 22 September 2006 to 27 October 2006 - Jan Bestry
- from 27 October 2006 to 15 November 2006 - Jozef Cepil
- from 15 November 2006 to 30 November 2006 - Krzysztof Szyga

=== Senators of the 5th legislature ===
- Jan Bestry,
- Józef Cepil, Prawo i Sprawiedliwość
- Piotr Cybulski – Prawo i Sprawiedliwość
- Marian Daszyk,
- Tadeusz Dębicki,
- Ryszard Kaczyński,
- Bogusław Kowalski,
- Gabriela Masłowska,
- Piotr Misztal,
- Henryk Młynarczyk – Prawo i Sprawiedliwość
- Halina Molka, Prawo i Sprawiedliwość
- Józef Pilarz,
- Bernard Ptak,
- Andrzej Ruciński, Prawo i Sprawiedliwość
- Anna Sobecka,
- Leszek Sułek
- Krzysztof Szyga,
- Zygmunt Wrzodak.

=== Senators of the 6th legislature ===
- Adam Biela, Prawica Rzeczypospolitej
- Waldemar Kraska.

== See also ==
- Self-Defence of the Republic of Poland
- Patriotic Self-Defense
- League of Polish Families
- Self-Defence Rebirth
- Self-Defence Social Movement
- Peasants' Party (Poland)
- Party of Regions (Poland)
