= Linow =

Linow may refer to:

== People ==
- Ivan Linow (1888 – 1940), also known as Jack Linow, Latvian-born American wrestler and character actor

== Places ==
- Linów, a village in the administrative district of Gmina Zawichost, within Sandomierz County, Świętokrzyskie Voivodeship
- Linów, a village in the administrative district of Gmina Zwoleń, within Zwoleń County, Masovian Voivodeship
- Linów-Kolonia, a village in the administrative district of Gmina Zawichost, within Sandomierz County, Świętokrzyskie Voivodeship
- Linów-Leśniczówka, a settlement in the administrative district of Gmina Zwoleń, within Zwoleń County, Masovian Voivodeship
- Lake Linow, a volcanic lake located outside Tomohon, near Manado, Indonesia
