= Czyżów Plebański =

- Village
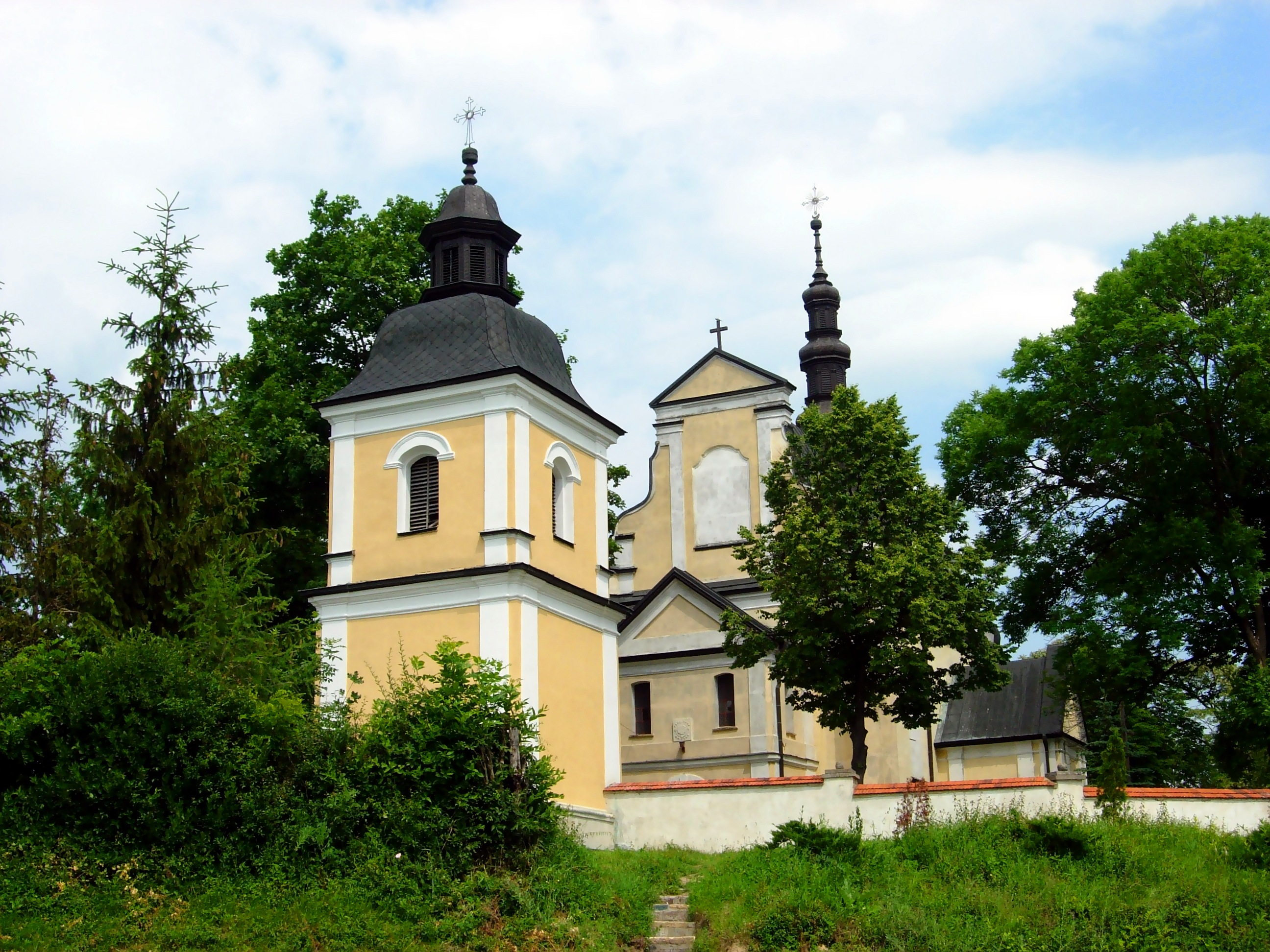
- Catholic church

- Location within Poland
- Coordinates: 50°49′36″N 21°48′12″E
- Country: Poland
- Voivodeship: Świętokrzyskie
- County: Sandomierz
- Gmina: Zawichost

Czyżów Plebański [ˈt͡ʂɨʐuf plɛˈbaɲski] is a village in the administrative district of Gmina Zawichost, within Sandomierz County, Świętokrzyskie Voivodeship, in south-central Poland. It lies approximately 5 km (3 mi) north-west of Zawichost, 17 km (11 mi) north of Sandomierz, and 84 km (52 mi) east of the regional capital Kielce.

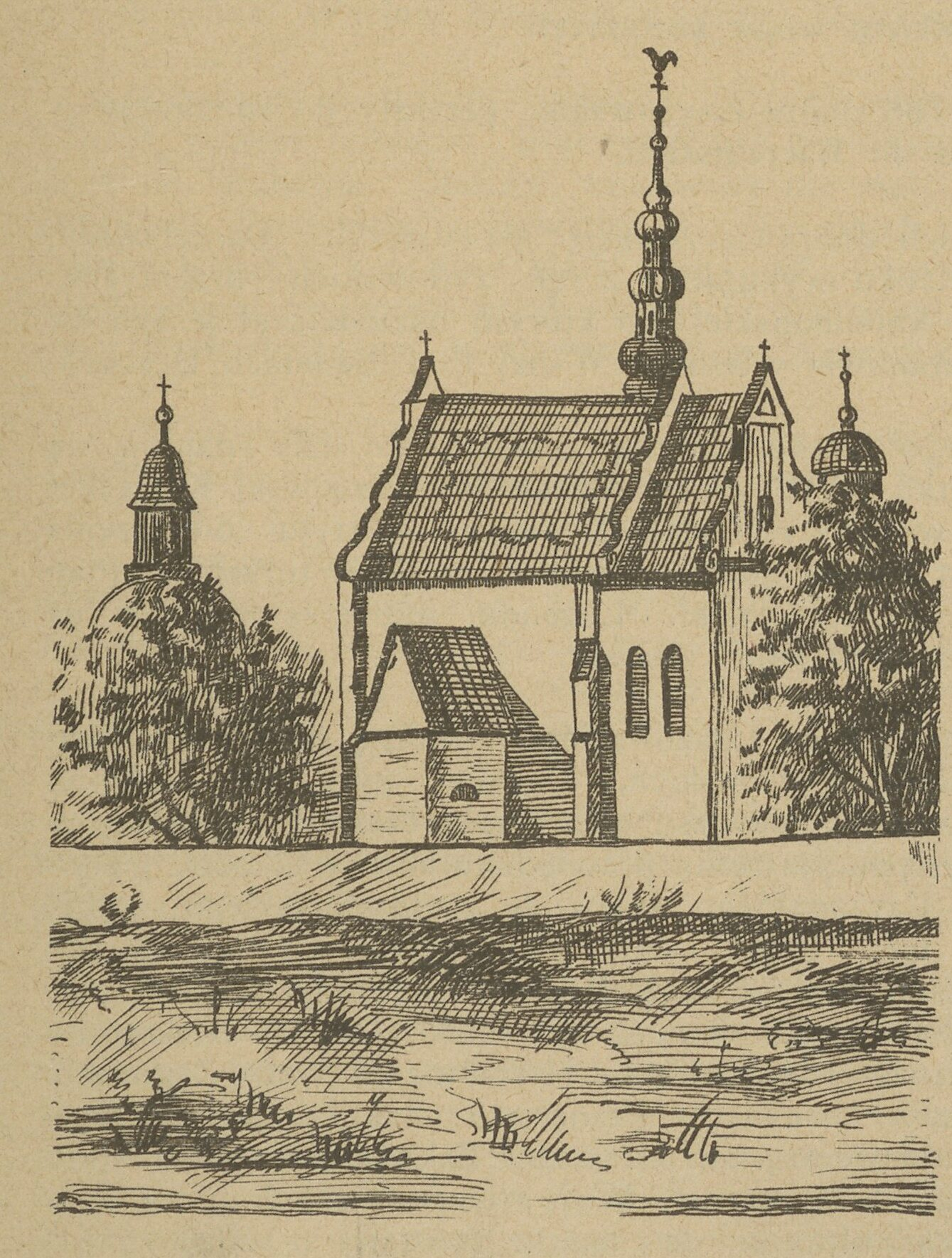
All Saints church, before 1907
