= Kolecin =

- Village
- Location within Poland
- Coordinates: 50°51′2″N 21°45′42″E
- Country: Poland
- Voivodeship: Świętokrzyskie
- County: Sandomierz
- Gmina: Zawichost

Kolecin [kɔˈlɛt͡ɕin] is a village in the administrative district of Gmina Zawichost, within Sandomierz County, Świętokrzyskie Voivodeship, in south-central Poland. It lies approximately 9 km (6 mi) north-west of Zawichost, 19 km (12 mi) north of Sandomierz, and 81 km (50 mi) east of the regional capital Kielce.
