= Chrapanów =

- Village
- Location within Poland
- Coordinates: 50°50′13″N 21°43′44″E
- Country: Poland
- Voivodeship: Świętokrzyskie
- County: Sandomierz
- Gmina: Zawichost

Chrapanów [xraˈpanuf] is a village in the administrative district of Gmina Zawichost, within Sandomierz County, Świętokrzyskie Voivodeship, in south-central Poland. It lies approximately 10 km (6 mi) west of Zawichost, 18 km (11 mi) north of Sandomierz, and 79 km (49 mi) east of the regional capital Kielce.
