= Pawłów, Sandomierz County =

Pawłów
- Village
- Location within Poland
- Coordinates: 50°48′33″N 21°45′34″E
- Country: Poland
- Voivodeship: Świętokrzyskie
- County: Sandomierz
- Gmina: Zawichost

Pawłów [ˈpavwuf] is a village in the administrative district of Gmina Zawichost, within Sandomierz County, Świętokrzyskie Voivodeship, in south-central Poland. It lies approximately 7 km (4 mi) west of Zawichost, 14 km (9 mi) north of Sandomierz, and 81 km (50 mi) east of the regional capital Kielce.
