= Wyspa, Świętokrzyskie Voivodeship =

Wyspa
- Village
- Location within Poland
- Coordinates: 50°47′50″N 21°44′17″E
- Country: Poland
- Voivodeship: Świętokrzyskie
- County: Sandomierz
- Gmina: Zawichost

Wyspa [ˈvɨspa] is a village in the administrative district of Gmina Zawichost, within Sandomierz County, Świętokrzyskie Voivodeship, in south-central Poland. It lies approximately 9 km (6 mi) west of Zawichost, 13 km (8 mi) north of Sandomierz, and 80 km (50 mi) east of the regional capital Kielce.
