= Józefków, Świętokrzyskie Voivodeship =

Józefków
- Village
- Location within Poland
- Coordinates: 50°48′46″N 21°43′30″E
- Country: Poland
- Voivodeship: Świętokrzyskie
- County: Sandomierz
- Gmina: Zawichost

Józefków [juˈzɛfkuf] is a village in the administrative district of Gmina Zawichost, within Sandomierz County, Świętokrzyskie Voivodeship, in south-central Poland. It lies approximately 10 km (6 mi) west of Zawichost, 15 km (9 mi) north of Sandomierz, and 79 km (49 mi) east of the regional capital Kielce.
