= Leszek Sułek =

Polish politician

member of Sejm 2005-2007
- In office 25 September 2005 – 2007

Personal details
- Born: 18 April 1954 (age 71)
- Party: Samoobrona

Leszek Sułek (born 18 April 1954 in Piotrowice near Zawichost) is a Polish politician. He was elected to the Sejm on 25 September 2005, getting 7590 votes in 33 Kielce district as a candidate from the Samoobrona Rzeczpospolitej Polskiej list.

== See also ==
- Members of Polish Sejm 2005-2007
