= Dąbie, Sandomierz County =

Dąbie
- Village
- Location within Poland
- Coordinates: 50°49′N 21°48′E
- Country: Poland
- Voivodeship: Świętokrzyskie
- County: Sandomierz
- Gmina: Zawichost

Dąbie [ˈdɔmbjɛ] is a village in the administrative district of Gmina Zawichost, within Sandomierz County, Świętokrzyskie Voivodeship, in south-central Poland. It lies approximately 5 km (3 mi) west of Zawichost, 16 km (10 mi) north of Sandomierz, and 84 km (52 mi) east of the regional capital Kielce.
