= Sanok Rubber Company =

Polish company specializing in rubber products

Sanok Rubber Company S.A.
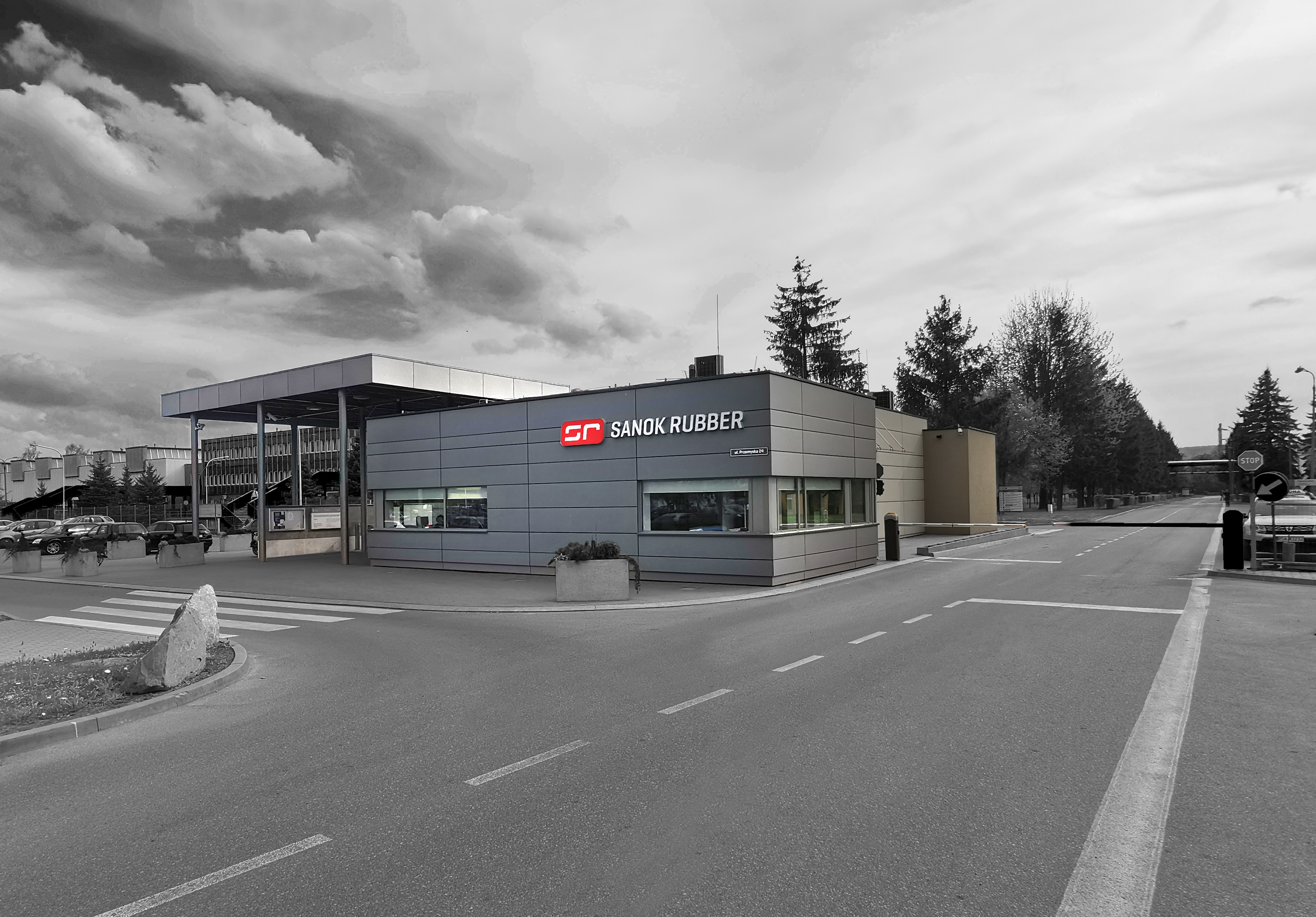
- Main gate (2019)
- Type: Joint-stock company
- Traded as: WSE: SANOK (SNK)
- ISIN: PLSTLSK00016
- Industry: Rubber industry
- Founded: 24 January 1932
- Founder: Oskar Schmidt
- Headquarters: 24 Przemyska Street, Sanok, Poland
- Key people: Piotr Szamburski (CEO), Marek Łęcki (Chairman of the Supervisory Board)
- Total equity: 5,376,384.40 PLN
- Owner: ING Otwarty Fundusz Emerytalny (11.53%), Marek Łęcki (11.04%), Aviva OFE Aviva BZ WBK (10.83%), Otwarty Fundusz Emerytalny PZU Złota Jesień (9.30%), Aviva Investors Poland Towarzystwo Funduszy Inwestycyjnych S.A. (6.60%)
- Website: www.sanokrubber.com

Sanok Rubber Company S.A. (formerly Sanok Stomil Rubber Industry Plant S.A.) is a Polish company specializing in the production of rubber products, based in Sanok, Poland.

== History ==
=== Polish Company Sanok for the Rubber Industry ===
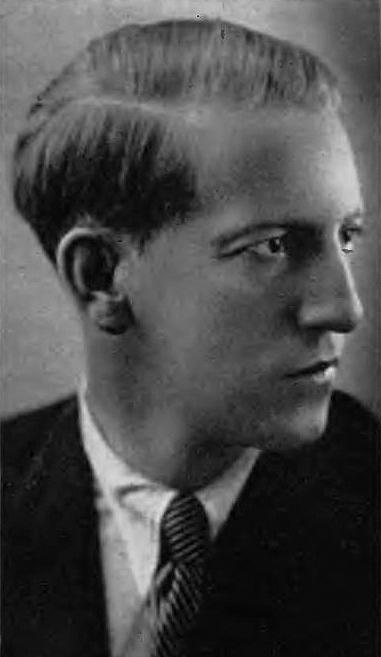
Founder Oskar Schmidt

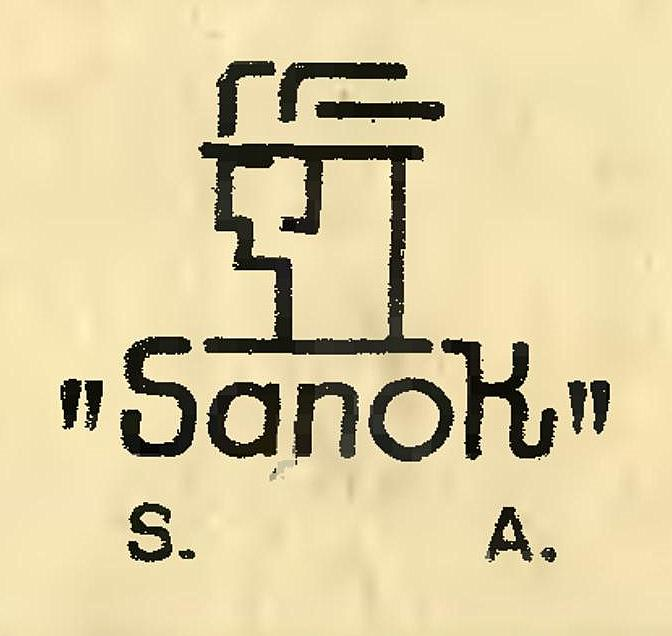
Logo of Sanok Polish Company for the Rubber Industry S.A. (1939)

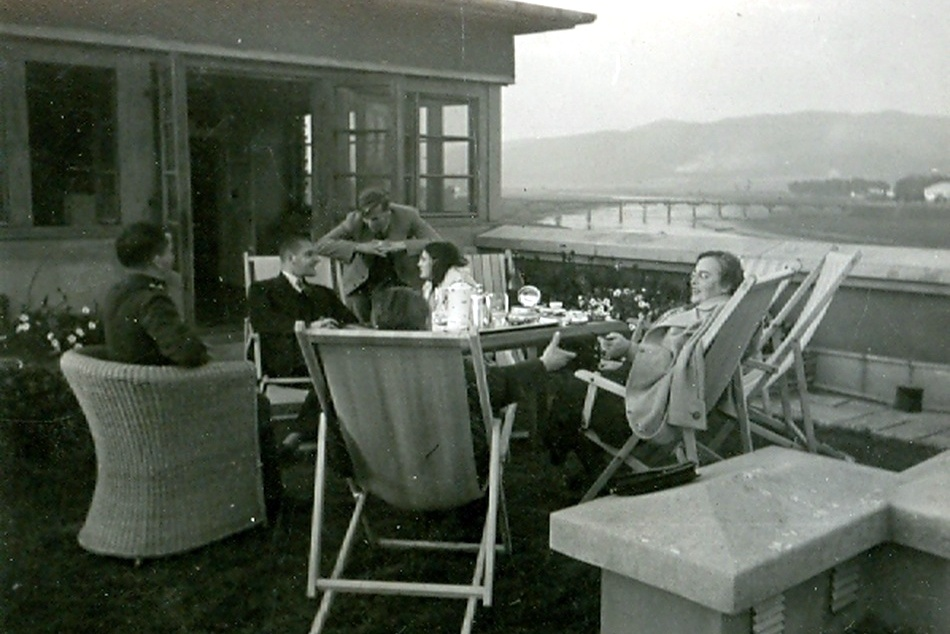
Company administration building at Władysław Reymont Street in 1935

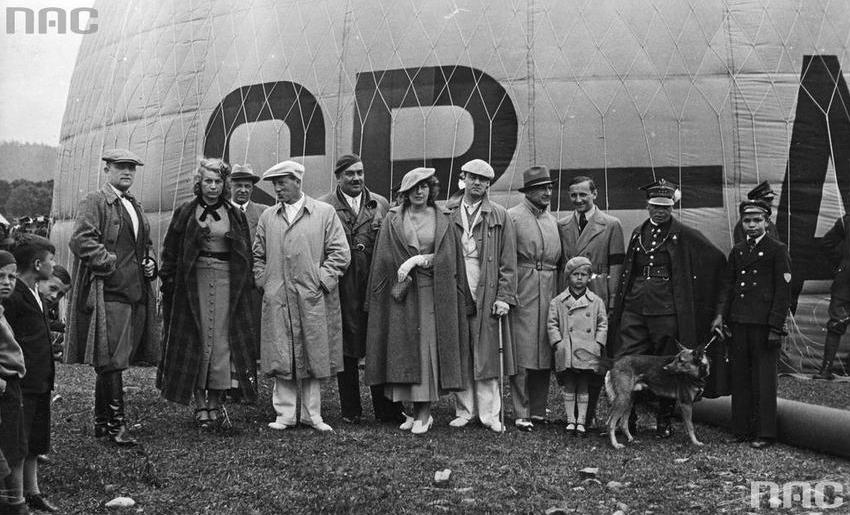
Oskar Schmidt, Olga Didur-Wiktorowa, and Adam Didur at a promotional event for the factory's products

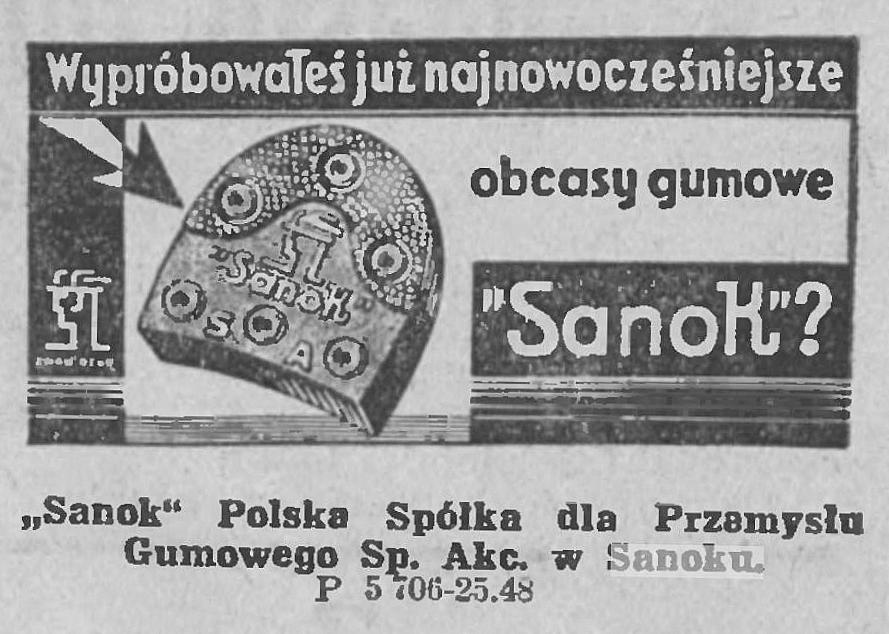
Advertisement in the 1934 issue of Orędownik newspaper

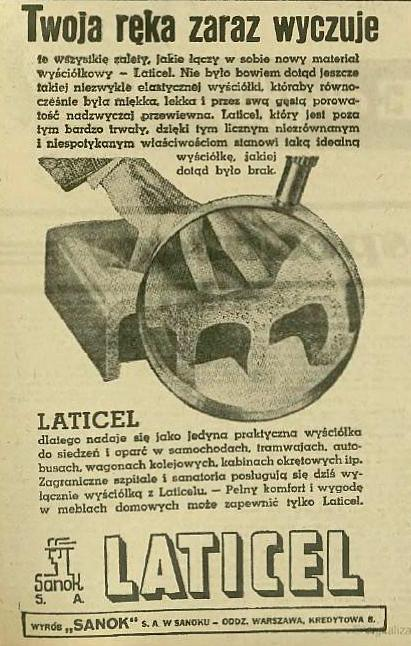
Advertisement for Laticel in Ilustrowany Kurier Codzienny (1939)

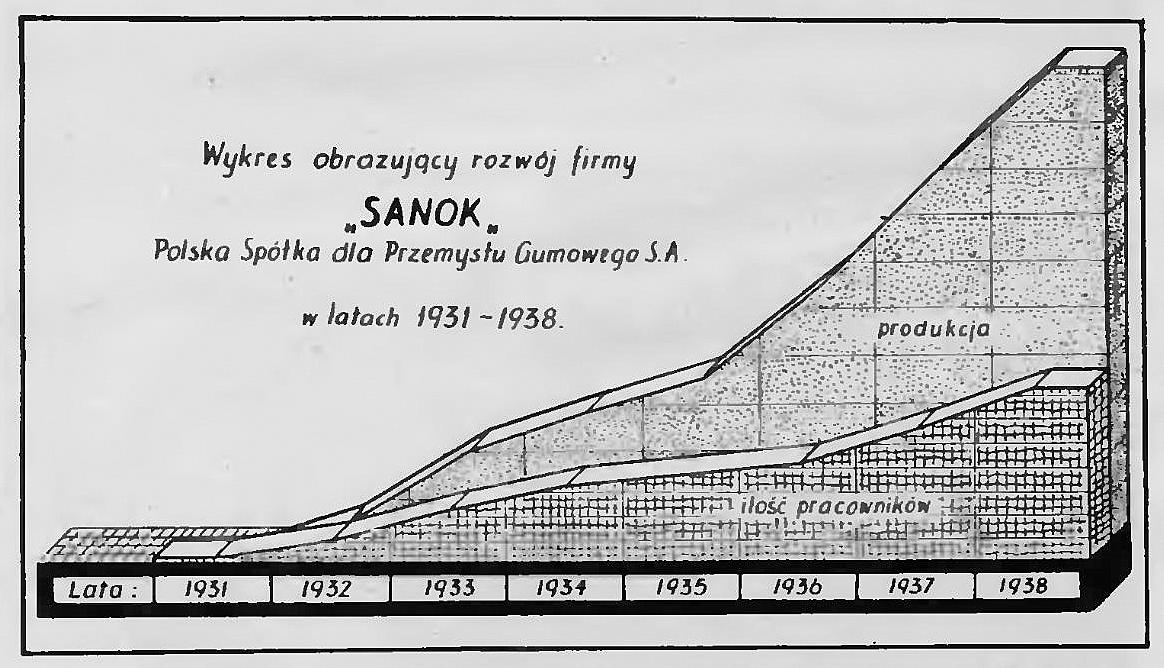
Production growth chart in the 1930s

The company was established in 1932 during the Second Polish Republic in the newly annexed Posada district of Sanok. The official founding date was 24 January 1932. The enterprise was built with capital from French and Swiss shareholders. Construction was undertaken by Bronisław Kędzierski and Co. Building and Reinforced Concrete Works, with the factory's dedication occurring on 20 March 1932. The founder, owner, and first director was Dr. Oskar Schmidt, an Austrian citizen and rubber technology expert, with his brother Karol Schmidt overseeing construction as the shareholders' general representative. The company was named Polish Company Sanok for the Rubber Industry. In 1932, the factory's directors were Eng. Piotr Lipczyk and Dr. Oskar Schmidt, with Schmidt later serving alone. In 1936, a second plant, Sanok Accumulator Factory, was established under Karol Schmidt, with Oskar Schmidt as general director. Both factories operated under shared management and interests.

The Sanok factory was included in the Central Industrial Region (COP), alongside a machine tool factory established by the Schmidts in Sanok, receiving 15 years of industrial and tax benefits from the Ministries of Treasury, Military Affairs, and Industry. The factory produced gas masks, sponge threads for the aviation and shipbuilding industries, and balloons. It demonstrated growth during the economic crisis of the 1930s.

In 1934, French scientist Auguste Piccard visited Sanok, intending to use factory materials for a new high-altitude balloon. Later, based on an invention by Dr. Oskar Schmidt and technical director Władysław Kubica, the factory rubberized the envelope of the high-altitude balloon Gwiazda Polski in 1938. The rubberizing process followed a proprietary recipe developed at the factory.

The company's assets included a factory nursery, a store offering food purchase credits, a community center with a radio and phonograph for dance evenings, training courses, universal life insurance, a vacation system, a resort in Nowy Sącz, and summer camps.

In 1938, the company employed 500 workers, 14 technical staff, and 40 office employees, with a factory area of approximately 15,000 m² and buildings covering 8,000 m². In 1938, the Minister of Industry and Trade fined the company 5,000 PLN for failing to register three cartel agreements related to rubber thread sales with other companies. In 1939, the share capital was increased to 2.5 million PLN.

The company's headquarters were at 9 Władysław Reymont Street in Sanok, as was the accumulator factory. The company had a representative office in Warsaw at 18 Widok Street in the 1930s, and later at Kredytowa Street in 1939. Representatives also operated in Kraków, Lviv, Poznań, Bydgoszcz, and Vilnius.

After acquiring a license for Laticel production, the company exhibited at the Poznań International Fair in 1937. In the summer of 1938, it participated in the Eastern Trade Fair in Lviv. In 1938, the factory received a gold medal at the Warsaw Hospital Exhibition for its porous rubber Laticel products (window and door seals, mattresses, and pillows).

Following the outbreak of World War II and the German occupation, the factory ceased operations. The Germans transported equipment and machinery to the Semperit plant in Kraków, while the Sanok Accumulator Factory was subordinated to Accumulatorenfabrik, though production was not continued, and only a repair shop operated. During the war, Edward Zajic, originally from Karviná, was appointed director of the rubber factory, transferred from Limanowa. He was also the head of the Sanok branch of the White Eagle Organization and the Union of Retaliation in the underground, later dying in Auschwitz concentration camp. Toward the war's end, the factory's buildings and infrastructure were destroyed due to military actions. The company's value in 1939 was estimated at 700,000 USD.

==== Employment and workforce ====
Initially, the factory employed 5 office workers and 15 laborers. By 1936, employment grew to over 1,200, reaching 1,500 in 1938, including 150 in laboratories, and approximately 2,000 by 1939. Due to the initial need for skilled workers, staff were recruited from factories in Wolbrom and Dębica. In the 1930s, Władysław Kubica served as director. Before 1939, employees included Józef Rymarowicz (vulcanizer), Władysław Gut, Mikołaj Szwan, Adam Bieniasz (also a member of the factory's Balloon Club, 1938–1939), and Tadeusz Towarnicki (clerk from 1939). In the late 1930s, the press noted exemplary employer-employee relations, with no strikes or trade unions.

==== Production ====
Before 1939, the factory relied on natural gas as an energy source. It produced gas mask components, rubber plates, transmission belts, V-belts for alternators, bicycle tires and tubes (noted for durability, e.g., "cord" and "rekord" models), rubber rims for carts, fire hoses, patented doors, rubber horseshoes, bath sponges, rubber heels, rubberized leather for soles, brake hoses (ordered for British freight wagons), assault boats, and balloon fabric. The factory also produced tents. Schmidt acquired an English license for Laticel, a porous rubber used for vehicle seat fillings. Recycling was widely used, with reclaimed rubber from production waste reused for tires, brakes, and railway components. The factory also manufactured rubber parts for military equipment.

=== Sanok Stomil Rubber Industry Plant ===
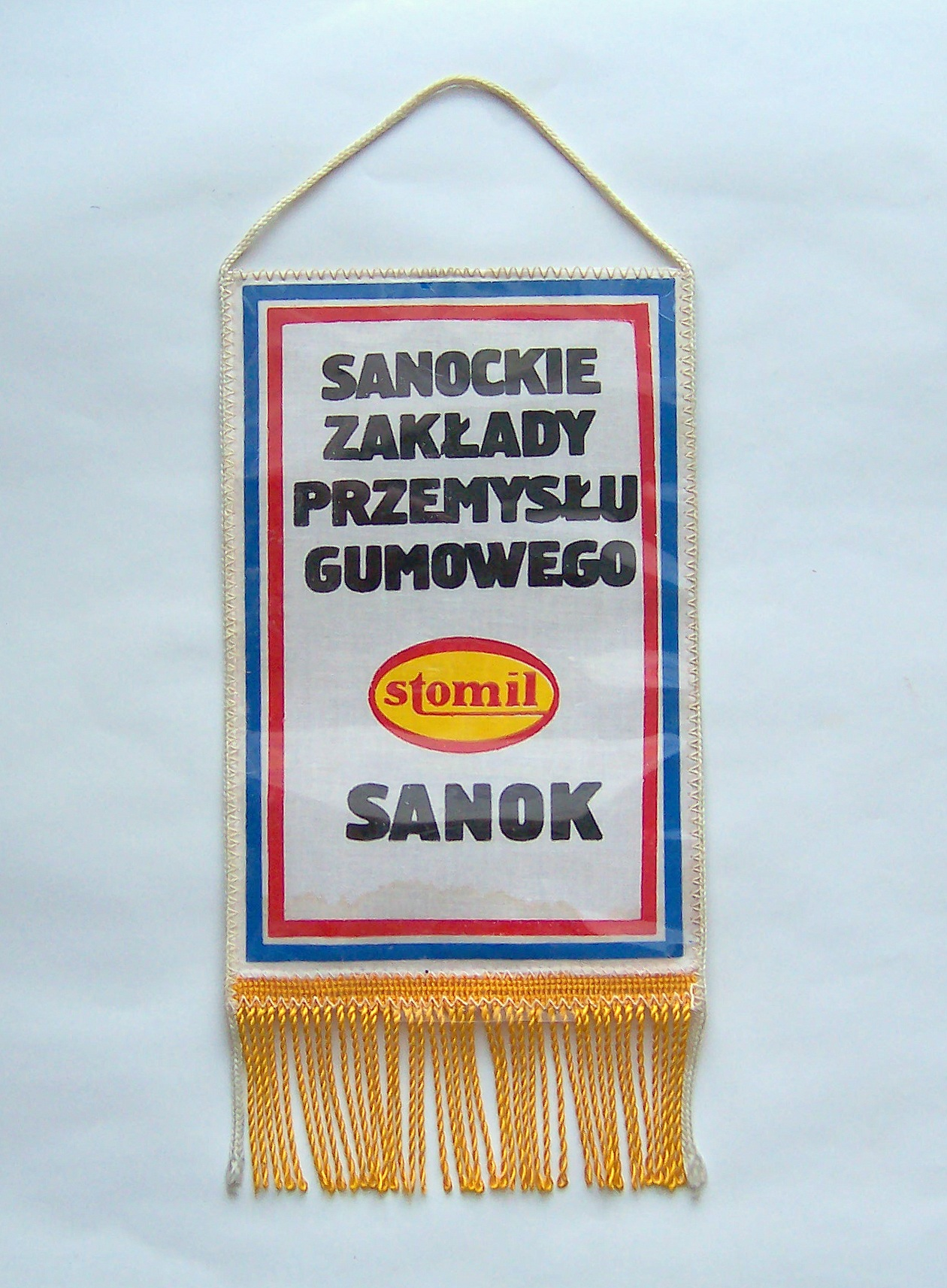
Pennant of SZPG Stomil and Sanoczanka Sanok

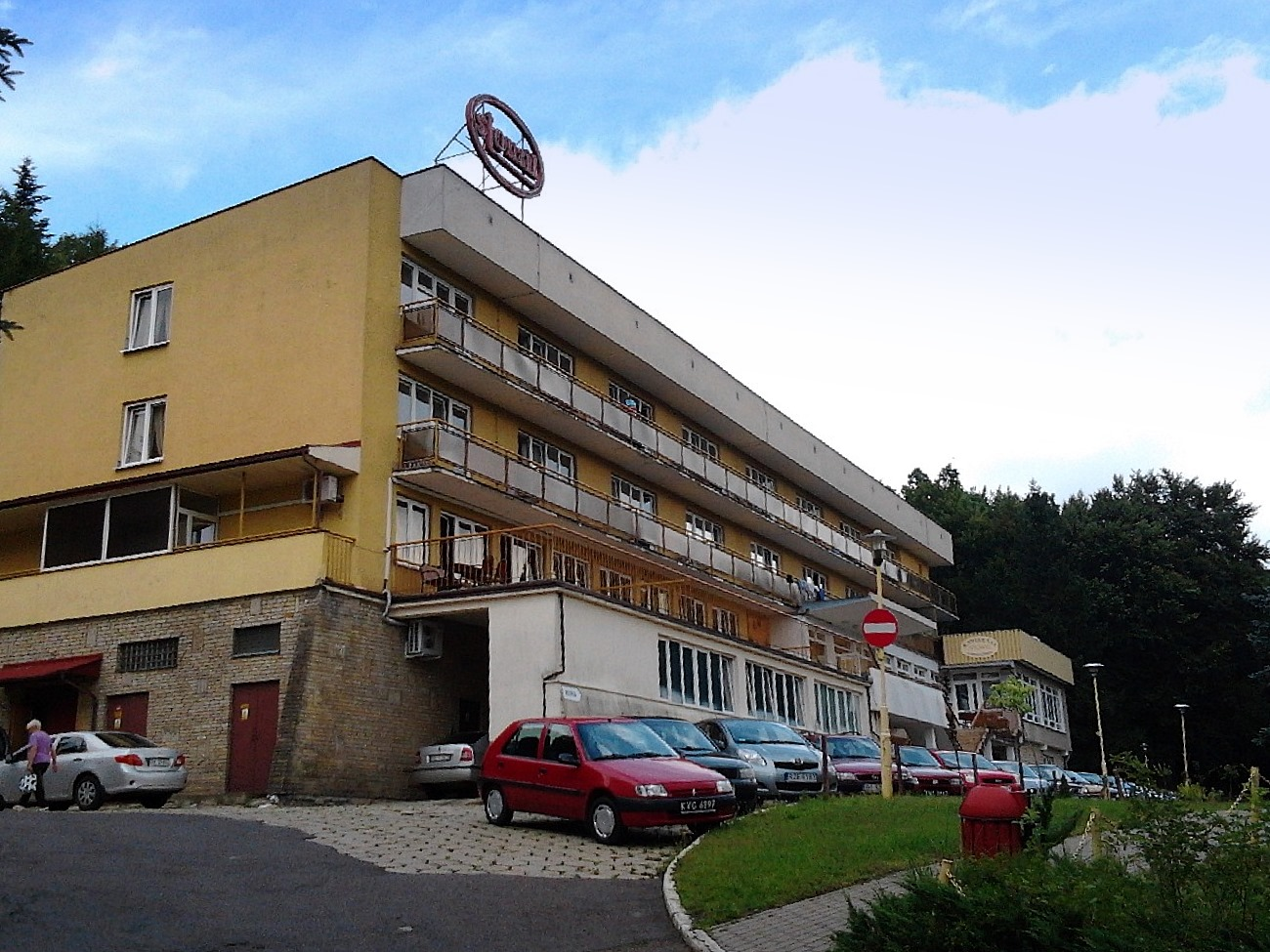
Stomil sanatorium building in Rymanów-Zdrój

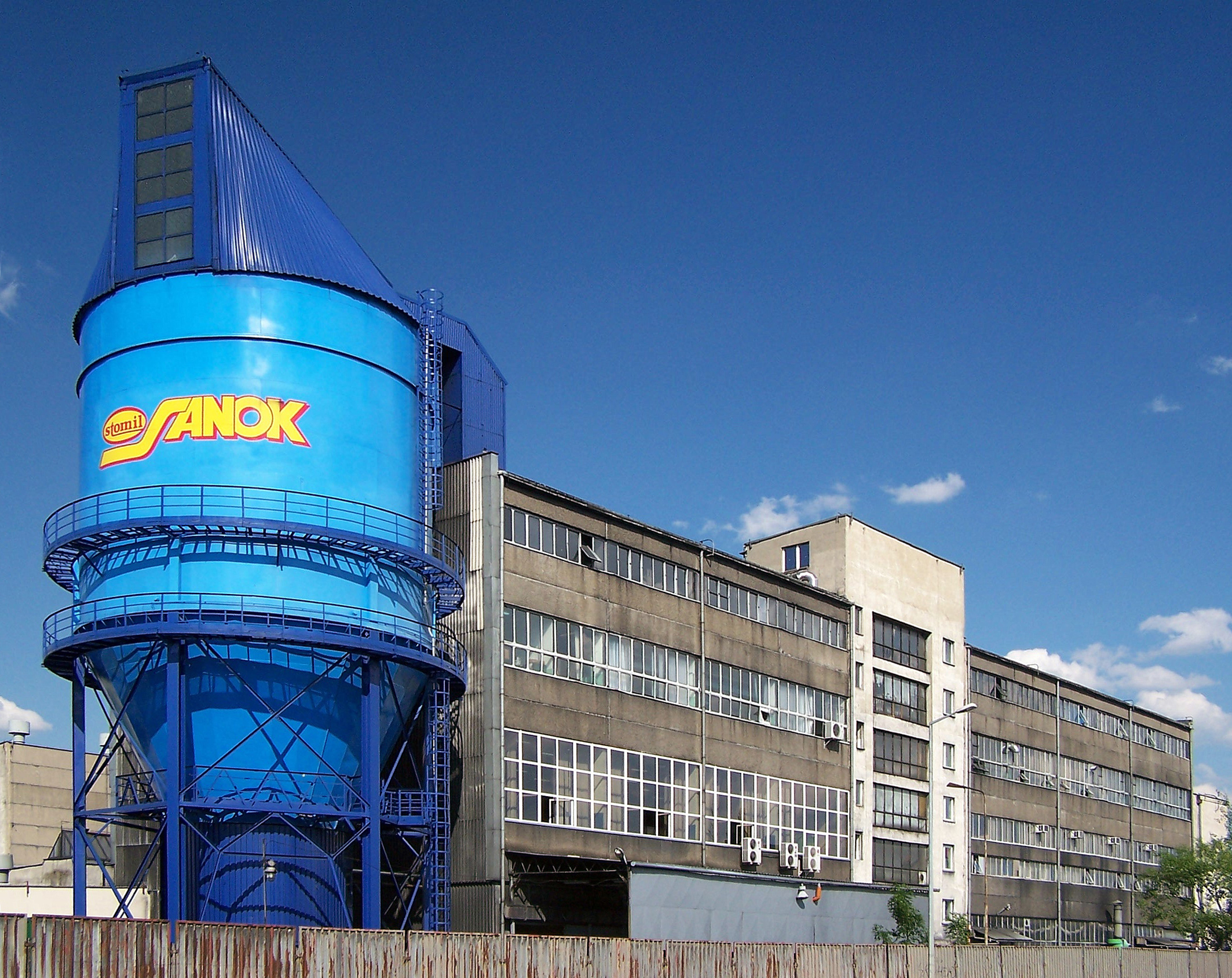
Factory buildings at Dworcowa Street – Rubber Compound Production Plant and soot tank (2007)

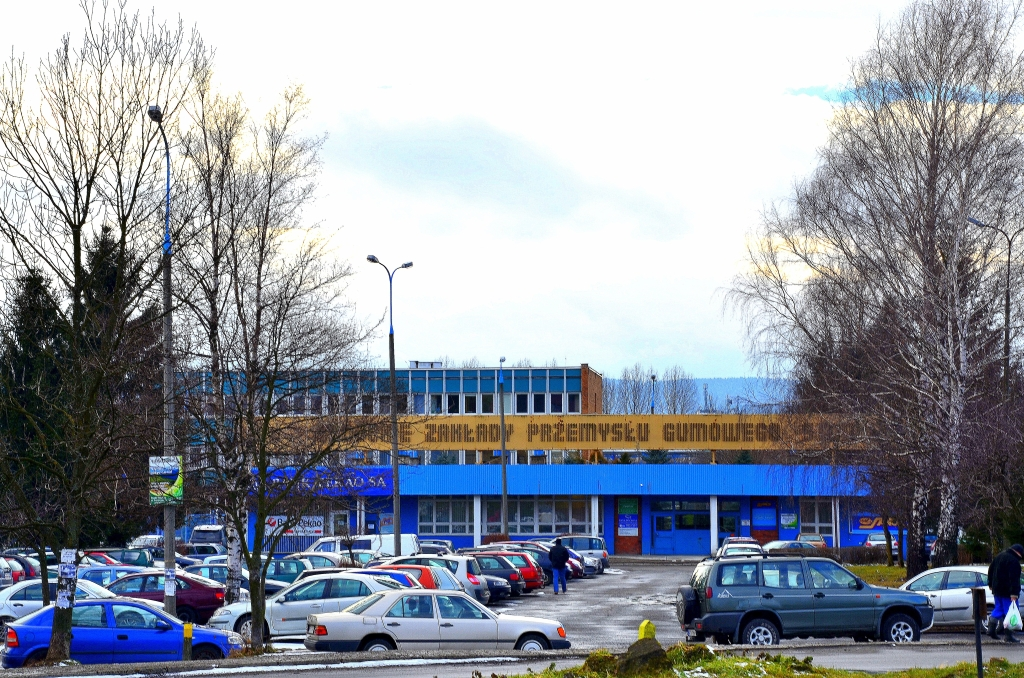
Parking and historic main gate at Przemyska Street (2013)

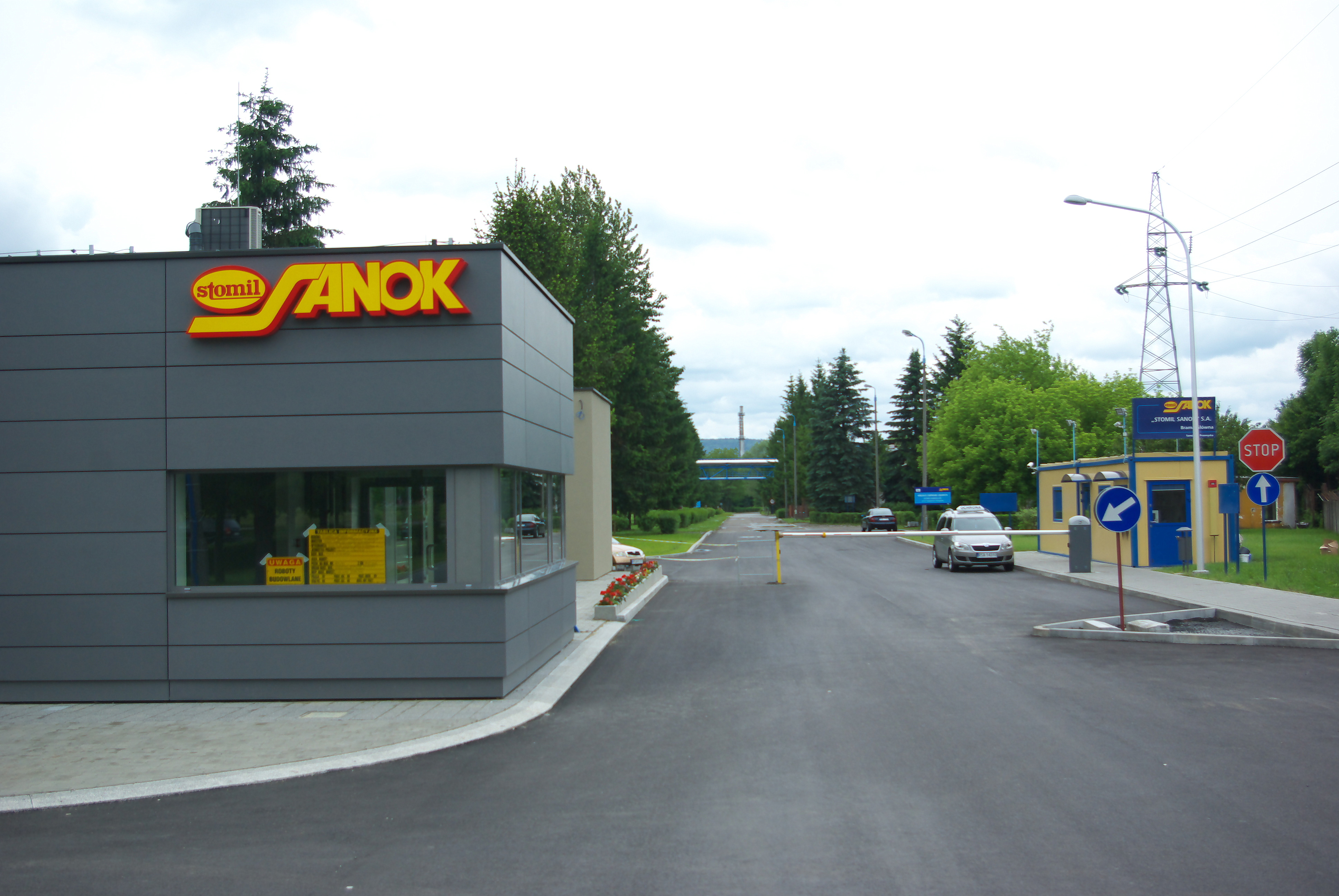
Gate at Przemyska Street

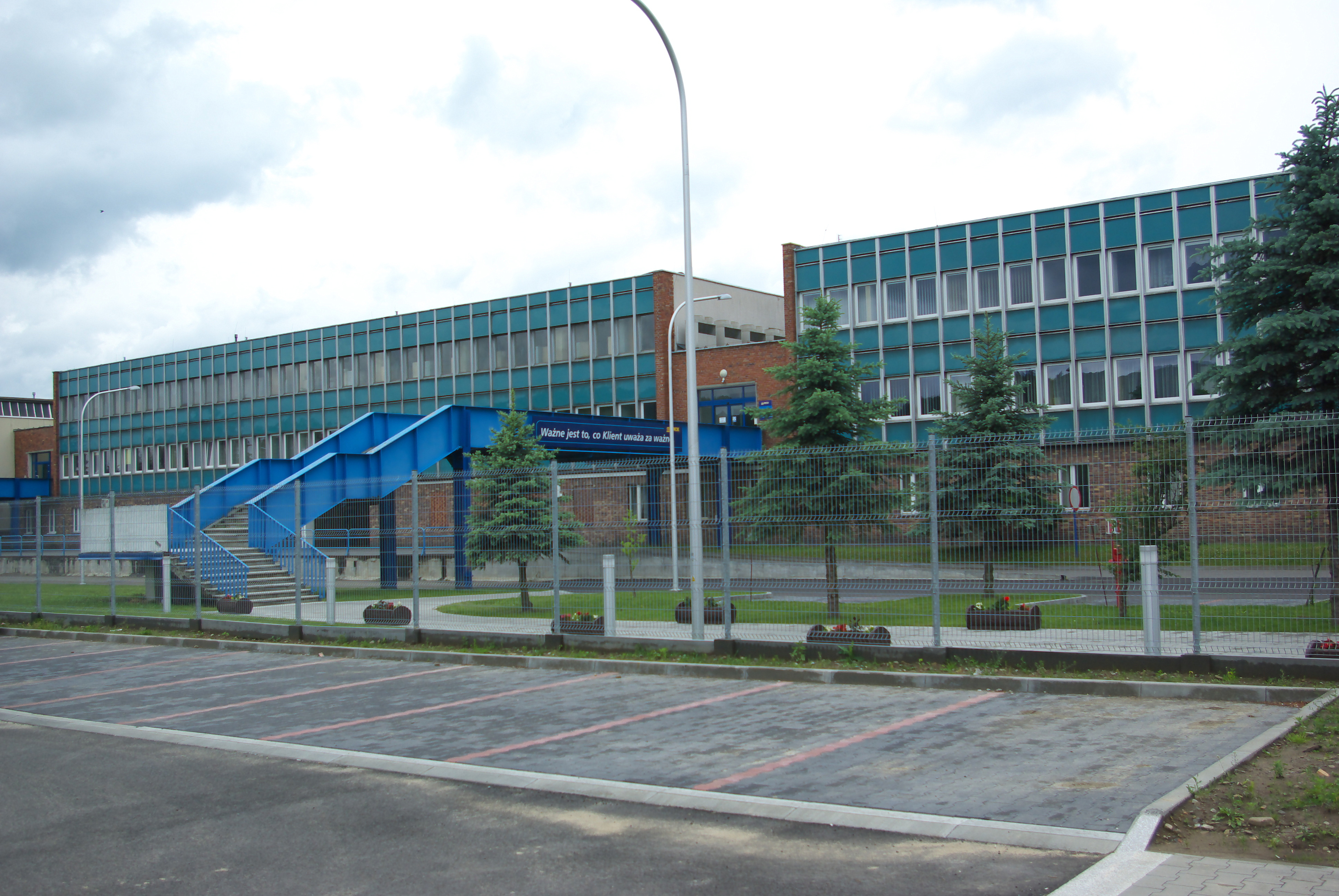
Factory buildings at Przemyska Street

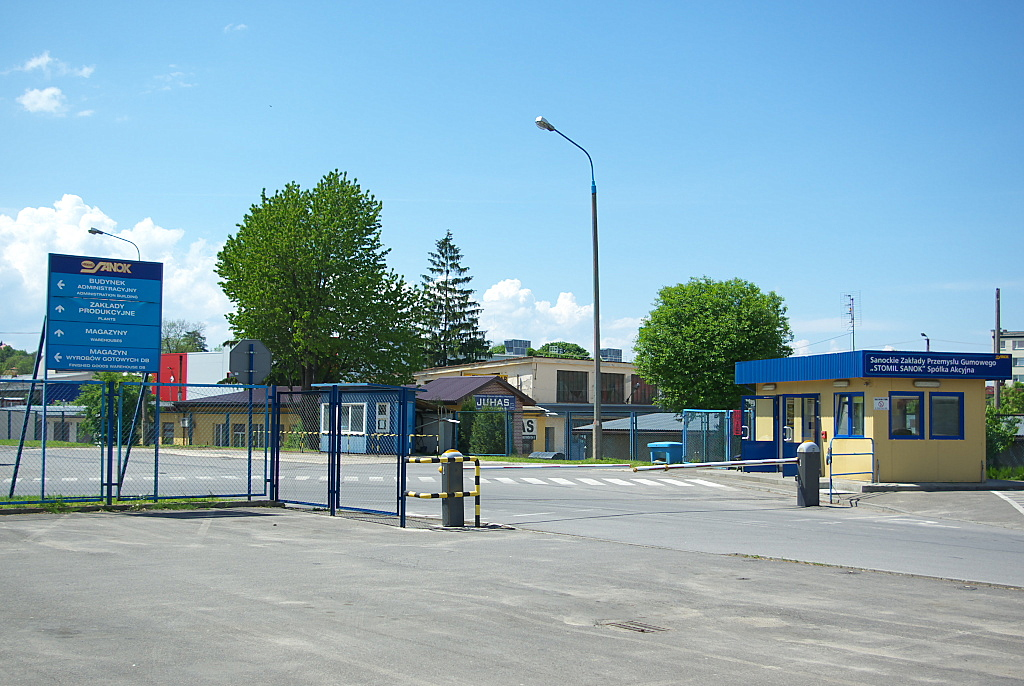
Gate at Władysława Reymonta Street

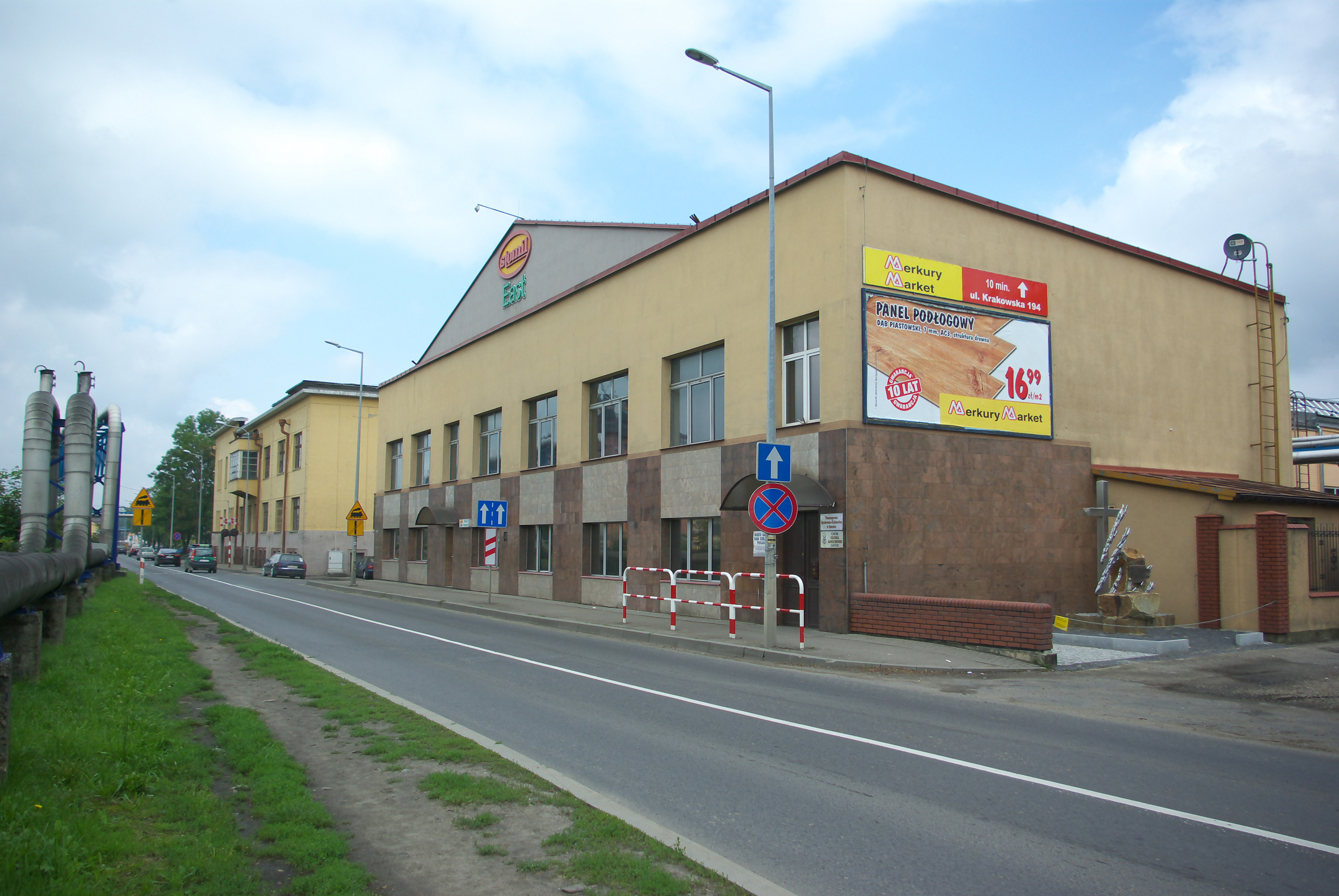
Stomil buildings at Dworcowa Street

At the war's end, the Sanok County National Council decided to rebuild the factory. However, other Polish People's Republic authorities transferred the rubber factory's infrastructure to the Rzeszów Grain Plants, and later, leased buildings served as fertilizer warehouses. Eventually, state authorities planned to relocate the preserved infrastructure to Bydgoszcz, but thanks to the intervention of Sanok's then-starosta Andrzej Szczudlik, the factory received financial support. Oskar Schmidt attempted to reclaim the nationalized company by the Polish Committee of National Liberation, intending to produce essential post-war goods like heels and soles from rubber waste. Ultimately, Decree No. 58 of the Minister of Light Industry, Jerzy Grzymek, on 14 December 1950, transferred the Sanok Stomil Rubber Industry Plant to state ownership.

Reconstruction was decided in 1954 and executed from 1956 to 1960, costing 100 million PLN. Pre-war machinery was returned from Kraków, and new infrastructure was built. The factory, officially named Sanok Rubber Industry Plant, reopened on 20 February 1960. In 1960, it produced 370 products with 185 employees. The factory celebrated its 10th anniversary in 1970.

In 1970, the factory was renamed Stomil Rubber Industry Plant. In 1976, it began producing V-belts under a license from the American company Gates. In 1978, the factory was expanded at a cost of 4 billion PLN, focusing on products for the domestic automotive industry. It employed 5,000 workers and occupied 58 hectares in the Olchowce district on both banks of the San river. Employment grew from 500 in 1964 to 2,100 in 1974, and over 5,000 in 1978, making it the city's second-largest employer after Autosan (7,000 employees). In the 1970s, Stomil supplied about 70% of its rubber products to the Polmo Bielsko-Biała, including seals for the Fiat 126. In early 1975, it delivered 400,000 hockey pucks.

In 1978, a medal commemorating the factory's 1973–1978 expansion was issued, designed by Zbigniew Osenkowski. On 1 August 1978, Polish Prime Minister Piotr Jaroszewicz visited, followed by First Secretary Edward Gierek on 9 August 1979. The day after martial law was declared on 13 December 1981, the factory's workforce went on strike, leading to internments, arrests, and dismissals, similar to events at Autosan.

The factory expanded its social infrastructure, including eight residential blocks, a sanatorium in Rymanów-Zdrój (opened in July 1973), a resort in Myczkowce, a health clinic with 13 specialist offices at Przemyska Street opened in 1978, and investments in municipal projects like waterworks and sewage treatment.

The factory sponsored the Sanoczanka Sanok sports club. In 1982, it celebrated its 50th anniversary, marked by a commemorative medal.

By 1993, the company's assets included:

- Eight residential blocks (approximately 1,200 apartments by 1978),
- A factory canteen,
- A sanatorium in Rymanów,
- A resort in Myczkowce,
- Two nurseries,
- A kindergarten,
- The Chemik Cultural-Educational Club and the Sanoczanka sports club,
- A swimming pool complex in Błonie.

==== Employment and workforce ====
By 1980, the factory employed 5,000 workers, dropping to 3,700 by 1990. Directors from 1957 to 1991 included Henryk Zwoliński, Adam Przybyło, Adam Szpet, Tadeusz Skórka (1967–1977), Zbigniew Paszta (1977–1981), Józef Baszak (1981–1990), and Andrzej Hołubowski (1990).

In the 1970s and 1980s, factory committee secretaries of the Polish United Workers' Party included Jan Buśko and Leonard Kabala. Employees included Zdzisław Smoliński, Marian Daszyk, Tadeusz Paszkiewicz (born 1948, former trade director, later president of PHU Stomil East, a trading company with 65.69% Stomil Sanok ownership), Eng. Michał Micherdziński, Stanisław Zajdel, Jan Samek, Marian Kawa (1974–1981), Stanisław Czekański (deputy director from 1979), and Marian Kunc.

==== Awards and recognitions ====
- Kowalski Award from Kurier Polski readers (1974)
- "Jubilee Address" (1984)
- Badge "For Merits to ZSMP" (1986, awarded to the factory's youth organization)
- Gold Honorary Badge of the Polish-Soviet Friendship Society (1986)
- Badge "For Merits to Krosno Voivodeship" (1987)
- Badge Meritorious for Sanok (1987)

=== Stomil Sanok Rubber Industry Plant S.A. ===
After becoming a joint-stock company on 1 January 1991, Marek Łęcki, previously Autosan's economic director, was appointed CEO and chairman through a 1990 competition.

Łęcki proposed a management buyout to the Ministry of Ownership Transformation, which was rejected. With consulting firms, Enterprise Investors was selected as a business partner. In 1990, part of the company's assets formed Pass-Pol (originally Pass-Stomil), with Stomil Sanok as a co-shareholder, employing nearly 2,500 workers by 2013.

In September 1993, Enterprise Investors acquired 80% of Stomil Sanok's shares from the State Treasury for 8.7 million PLN ($4.5 million). Employees received 15% at a lower price, and management took 5%. Łęcki reduced employment from 3,700 to 2,500, and to 1,400 by 2003, with Michał Boni, an Enterprise Investors consultant, aiding in workforce management.

On 14 September 1995, the company received ISO 9001 certification. Since 28 January 1997, it has been listed on the Warsaw Stock Exchange. In 2002, it received the "Pantheon of Polish Ecology" award from the Minister of Environment and the Polish Center for Testing and Certification.

In July 2003, the management group, holding 10% of shares, purchased additional shares from Enterprise Investors via a management buyout, supported by pension and investment funds. In October 2014, the company acquired the German company Draftex Automotive GmbH.

==== Sales ====
The automotive segment, including body seals and anti-vibration systems, accounts for 45% of revenue, supported by foreign specialists. German company Tagex is a main partner, supplying drive components like V-belts and chains.

In 2013, sales reached 720.1 million PLN, with 471.3 million PLN from exports and a net profit of 68.2 million PLN.

===== Domestic sales =====
Domestic sales of V-belts and construction seals are managed by Stomil Sanok Dystrybucja, fully owned by Stomil Sanok SA, through six warehouses. In 2010, the "Stomil Agro" segment for agricultural machinery was established, offering Deutz-Fahr tractors and combines. In 2013, domestic sales via Stomil Sanok Dystrybucja contributed 7.3% to the Group's sales, with own products comprising less than half.

==== Foreign sales ====
Sales of proprietary products – mainly V-belts and seals – on Eastern markets such as Russia, Belarus, and Ukraine are conducted through subsidiary companies. The share of each individual company does not exceed 10% of the total sales value of the Stomil Sanok Group:

- PHU Stomil East Sp. z o.o. – sales of Stomil Sanok products (V-belts and seals) on CIS markets; employs 6 people.
- Stomil Sanok Rus Sp. z o.o. in Moscow – sales of Stomil Sanok products (V-belts and seals) on CIS markets (100% ownership); director: Sergiusz Skawałowski; employs 12 people.
- Stomil Sanok Ukraina Sp. z o.o. in Rivne – sales of Stomil Sanok products (V-belts and seals) on CIS markets (100% ownership); director: Ignacy Szyszko; employs 22 people.
- Stomil Sanok Wiatka S.A. in Kirov – sales of Stomil Sanok products on the Russian market (81.1% of voting rights); director: Oleg Chobay; employed 8 people (as of 2012).
- Z.P.P.U. P. Stomil Sanok BR in Brest, Belarus – sales of Stomil Sanok products on the Russian and Belarusian markets (100% of voting rights); director: Zbigniew Kotarba; employs 73 people.
- Rubber & Plastic Systems S.A.S. in Villers-la-Montagne – production and sales of body sealing systems (100% of voting rights); director: Rafał Grzybowski; employs 41 people.
- Sanok Qingdao Auto Parts in Qingdao – marketing activities; director: Tomasz Bochnak; employs 1 person.
- Meteor China-Beteiligungs GmbH in Bockenem – holding company; directors: Marcin Saramak and Dieter Lemke; holds 20% of shares in Sanok Qingdao Auto Parts.

==== Management remuneration ====
For the year 2012, the total remuneration of the company's management amounted to 3,748,124.00 PLN, including fixed salaries (2,040,000 PLN), and variable remuneration (1,708,124 PLN).

Breakdown by individual Management Board members:

- Marek Łęcki – 552,000.00 PLN (fixed) + 456,375.00 PLN (bonus) = 1,008,375.00 PLN total
- Marta Rudnicka – 378,000.00 PLN (fixed) + 315,656.00 PLN (bonus) = 693,656.00 PLN total
- Mariusz Młodecki – 354,000.00 PLN (fixed) + 304,781.00 PLN (bonus) = 658,781.00 PLN total
- Grażyna Kotar – 378,000.00 PLN (fixed) + 315,656.00 PLN (bonus) = 693,656.00 PLN total
- Marcin Saramak – 378,000.00 PLN (fixed) + 315,656.00 PLN (bonus) = 693,656.00 PLN total

==== Shareholders ====
Shareholders holding more than 5% of shares in 2013:

- ING OFE – 3,400,000 shares – 12.65%
- Marek Łęcki – 2,967,900 shares – 11.04% (2013); unchanged in the first half of 2014
- OFE PZU Złota Jesień – 2,656,000 shares – 9.88%
- Aviva Investors Poland SA – 2,379,411 shares – 8.85%
- Aviva OFE Aviva BZ WBK – 1,527,783 shares – 5.68%
- PKO BP BANKOWY PTE S.A. – 1,375,875 shares – 5.12%

==== Shares held by management ====
- Marta Rudnicka, Director for Research and New Launches – 1,307,820 shares (2013 and first half of 2014); since June 2015, member of the Supervisory Board of Stomil Sanok
- Mariusz Młodecki, Director for Logistics and Purchasing – 94,800 shares
- Grażyna Kotar, Director of Finance – 31,000 shares (2013 and first half of 2014)
- Marcin Saramak, Director of Business Development – 30,200 shares (2013 and first half of 2014)
- Rafał Grzybowski – 10,000 shares (first half of 2014)

==== Distinctions ====
- Honorary title of "Company of the Year 1995" awarded by the weekly Nowe Podkarpacie.

=== Sanok Rubber Company S.A. ===
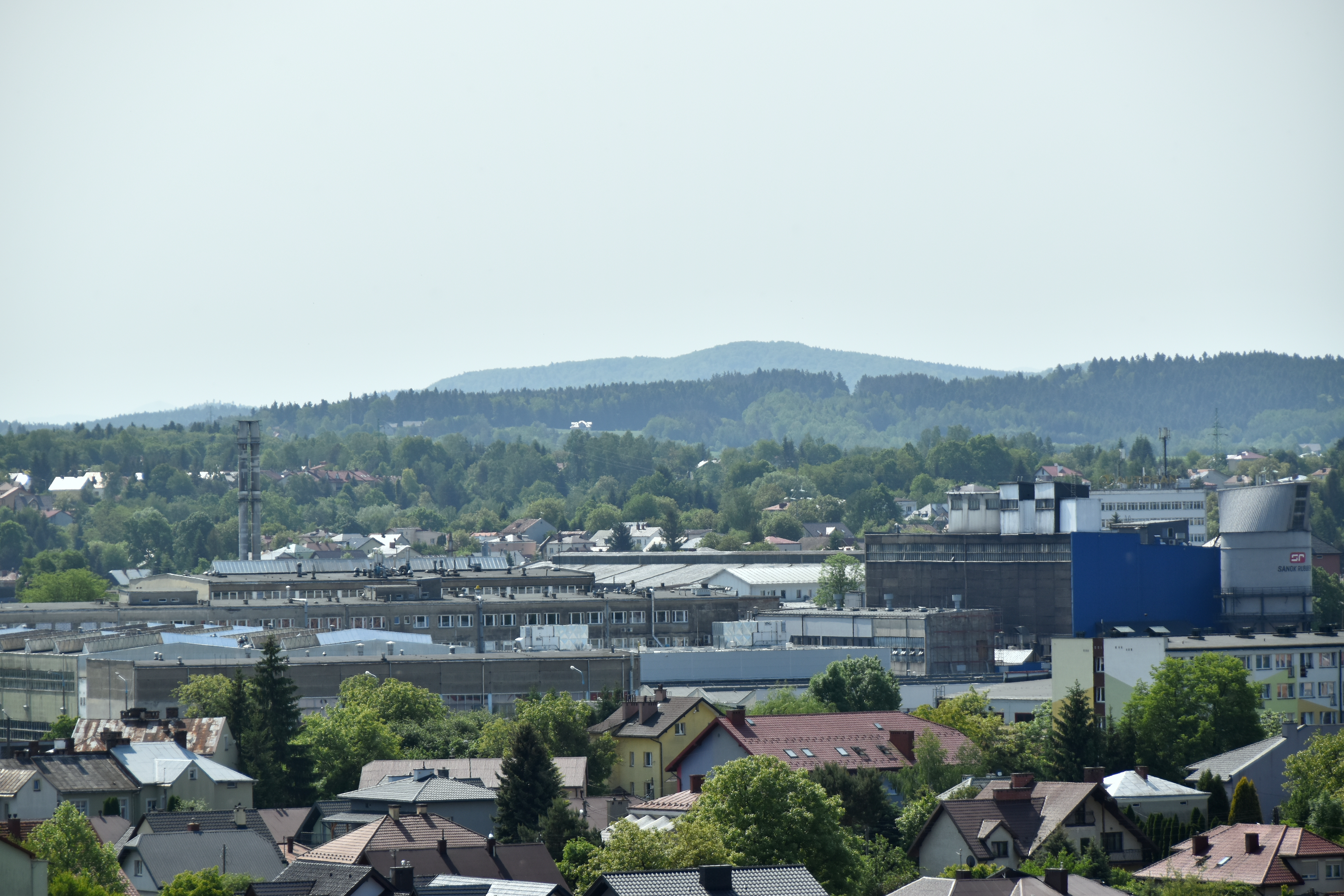
View of the factory buildings (2023)

On 2 November 2015, the company changed its name. After the registration of the new name and statute, Stomil Sanok Rubber Industry Plant S.A. became Sanok Rubber Company S.A. The company also uses the abbreviated name Sanok RC S.A.

The Sanok Rubber Group's sales in 2015 amounted to 903.52 million PLN, an 18% increase compared to the previous year (768.61 million PLN in 2014). This growth in sales revenue was primarily achieved thanks to the German-based subsidiary Draftex Automotive GmbH, which operates in the automotive sector. In 2015, sales of the Group's products for the automotive industry made up 54% of its total sales value. Sales of tooling for rubber and plastics production, as well as machine repair services provided by Stomet Sp. z o.o. to customers outside the Group, generated 129.1 million PLN in revenue in 2015. On 18 March 2016, the day the company's financial report for 2015 was published, Grażyna Kotar, the financial director of Sanok RC, terminated her employment contract and resigned from the management board.

The market environment affects the company's organizational structure, which now consists of the construction, industrial, and automotive business divisions (automotive division management includes Sanok, RPS S.A.S. in France, Draftex, QMRP China, and AQAP China). Since 2015, the director of the industrial division has been Wiesław Wyżycki, former president of Autosan, who was dismissed from his position in 2009 alongside Wiesław Krzanowski. Marek Łęcki served as president of the management board from 1991 to 2017.

==== Colmant Cuvelier ====
In February 2015, the Sanok company acquired the assets of Colmant Cuvelier through its French subsidiary, RPS. Colmant Cuvelier, based in Lille, is a manufacturer of power transmission components with a tradition spanning several decades, operating branches in Wevelgem and Turin. On 15 January 2015, Stomil Sanok SA took possession of the assets of Colmant Cuvelier. Colmant Cuvelier is a French manufacturer of V-belts with a 120-year tradition (founded in 1895), specializing in power transmission supplies mainly for the local French industrial market, as well as markets in North Africa and Western European countries. The company's turnover was 7.6 million euros in 2013 and 4.5 million euros in the first eight months of 2014. At the end of 2014, the Lille plant employed 47 people.

== Events ==
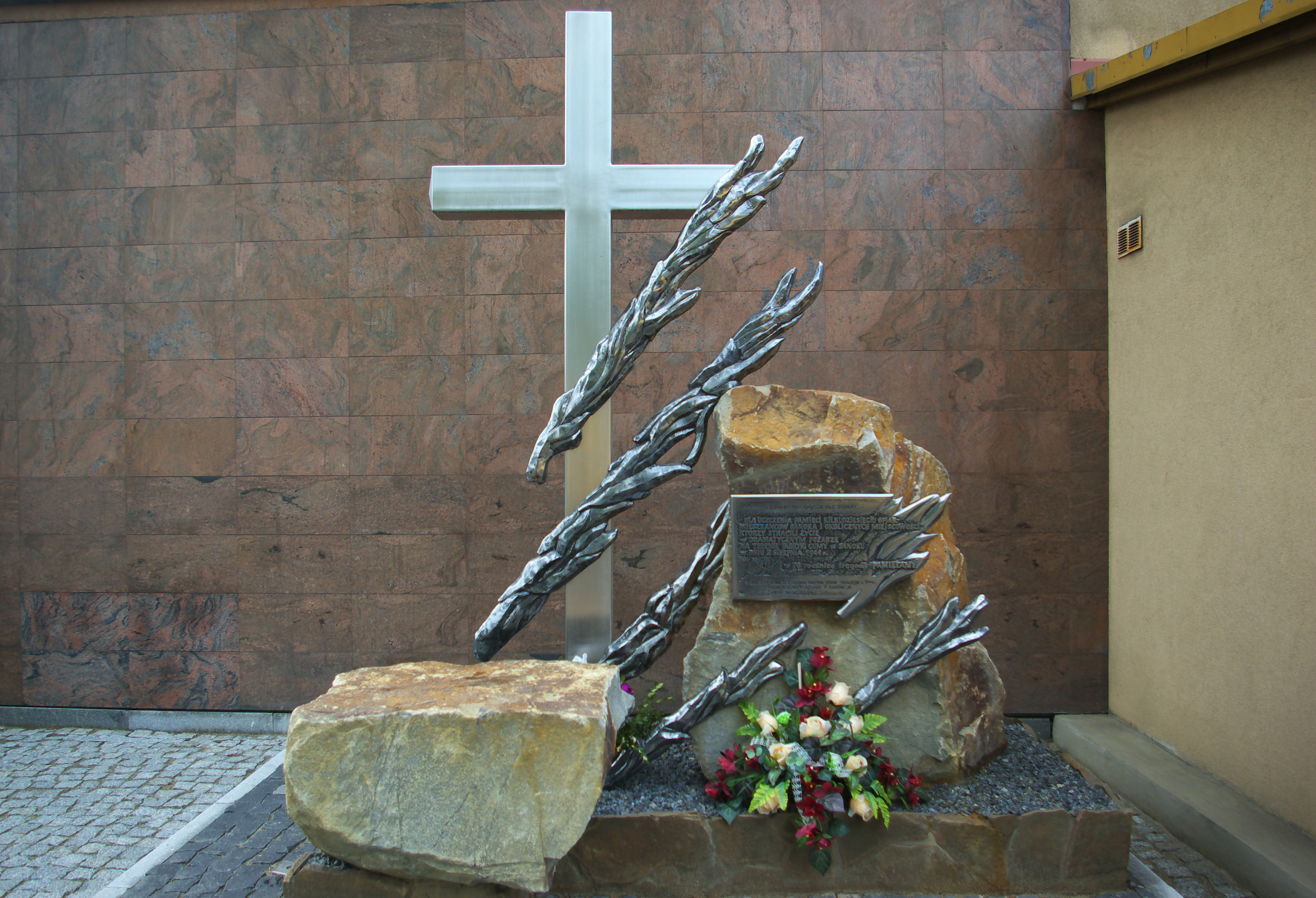
Memorial cross dedicated to the victims of the 1944 fire

On 2 August 1944, an explosion and fire broke out at the factory in the area occupied by the warehouses of the Velikoy National Trade Cooperative Soyuz, operated by Ukrainians. The incident resulted in the death of several dozen people (about 70). The event has been commemorated with crosses to remember the victims:

- The first cross, from the late 1950s or early 1960s, was made and funded by the blacksmith Andrzej Bar. Next to it, a weeping willow was planted by Józef Baszak.
- The second was a metal cross with a commemorative plaque, erected in 1994 on the initiative of the Sanoczanie senior club with support from residents of the Posada district and the district council. The inscription read: "The cross was erected to commemorate several dozen people who tragically died in the flames as living torches – due to the explosion of flammable materials at the Rubber Factory on 2 August 1944. Their memory will remain alive in our hearts. Residents of the Posada District". This cross was removed in 2014.
- The third is a monument cross with a commemorative plaque, unveiled before the 70th anniversary of the event on 14 June 2014. It is a granite cross surrounded by stylized flames, set on sandstone rocks. The inscription reads: "…love and memory stronger than death… To honor the memory of several dozen victims – residents of Sanok and nearby towns who lost their lives in the tragic fire at the Rubber Factory in Sanok on 2 August 1944. On the 70th anniversary of the tragedy, we remember. The social committee commemorating the victims of the 1944 tragedy. Posada district councilors of the 5th term. Sanok, 14 June 2014".

In September 2007, as part of the celebrations of the 75th anniversary of the factory's founding, the management of Stomil Sanok organized a recreational picnic on the Sanok meadows, featuring performances by Majka Jeżowska, Kabaret pod Wyrwigroszem, and Paweł Kukiz with the band Piersi.

On 23 June 2014, during the World Congress of Sanok residents, the "old plant" on Władysław Reymont Street was visited by Marina Schmidt, the youngest daughter of Dr. Oskar Schmidt. This was the first visit by a member of the Schmidt family since the end of World War II.

== Other information ==
Based on a 1980 agreement between Stomil's director Zbigniew Paszta and Jagiellonian University rector Mieczysław Hess, a renovation of the Tadeusz Stryjeński Palace on Stefan Batory Street in Kraków was carried out between 1980 and 1987 with the help of the city of Sanok and the Stomil Sanok Rubber Industry Plant.

== Bibliography ==
- Bałda, Waldemar (2012). Sowa i bocian. Opowieść o Posadzie Olchowskiej – III dzielnicy Miasta Sanoka [The Owl and the Stork. A Story of Posada Olchowska – the Third District of the Town of Sanok] (in Polish). Kraków: AB Media. ISBN 978-83-935385-7-7.
