= Witold Zapała =

Polish dancer, choreographer, and pedagogue (1935–2020)

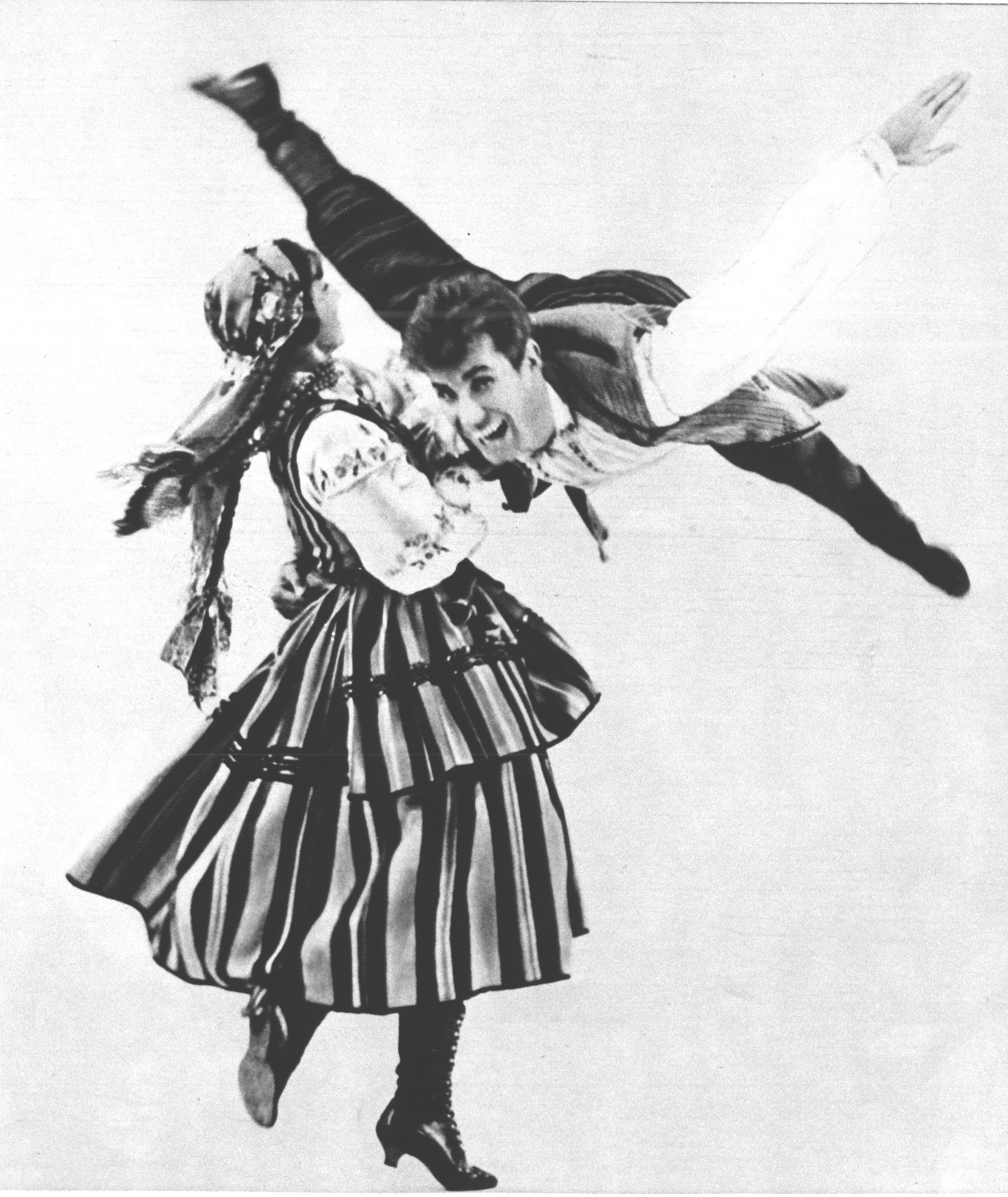
- Born: 5 June 1935; Dziurów, Second Polish Republic
- Died: 9 September 2020 (aged 85)

Witold Idzi Zapała (5 June 1935 – 9 September 2020) was a Polish dancer, choreographer and pedagogue. For over 50 years (1957 – 2011), Witold Zapala collaborated with Mazowsze, the Polish Song and Dance Ensemble (Polish: Zespół Ludowy Pieśni i Tańca Mazowsze), for whom he created repertory of dances and folk ceremonies from 43 ethnographic regions of Poland.

Zapała was also an originator, director and choreographer of children dance group Varsovia. Zapała was born in Dziurów, near Starachowice, and began his career at age 16 with the folk troupe Skolimow. He also trained Polish folk dancers in the United States, and has choreographed the dance sequences for the Polish Opera, Straszny dwór (Stanisław Moniuszko) in Warsaw.

In October 2011 Wytańczone "Mazowsze" Witolda Zapały, a book about Zapała's career with Mazowsze was published. It was written by a former Mazowsze dancer, Małgorzata Włoczkowska. Witold Zapała is one of Mazowsze's "Legends".
