= Józef Pilarz =

Polish politician

member of Sejm 2005-2007
- In office 25 September 2005 – 2007

Personal details
- Born: 10 June 1956
- Died: 22 March 2008 (aged 51)
- Party: Samoobrona

Józef Walerian Pilarz (10 June 1956 in Barlinek – 22 March 2008) was a Polish politician. Originally a farming contractor, he was elected to the Sejm in 2005 in the 37th Konin district as a candidate from Samoobrona Rzeczpospolitej Polskiej (Self-Defense of the Republic of Poland) list. In September 2006 he resigned from this post and moved to newly created party called Ruch Ludowo-Narodowy (Polish National Movement).

== See also ==
- Members of Polish Sejm 2005-2007
