= Piotrowice, Świętokrzyskie Voivodeship =

Piotrowice
- Village
- Location within Poland
- Coordinates: 50°50′13″N 21°50′11″E
- Country: Poland
- Voivodeship: Świętokrzyskie
- County: Sandomierz
- Gmina: Zawichost

Piotrowice [pjɔtrɔˈvit͡sɛ] is a village in the administrative district of Gmina Zawichost, within Sandomierz County, Świętokrzyskie Voivodeship, in south-central Poland. It lies approximately 4 km (2 mi) north-west of Zawichost, 19 km (12 mi) north of Sandomierz, and 86 km (53 mi) east of the regional capital Kielce.
