= Linów, Świętokrzyskie Voivodeship =

Linów
- Village
- Location within Poland
- Coordinates: 50°51′38″N 21°48′28″E
- Country: Poland
- Voivodeship: Świętokrzyskie
- County: Sandomierz
- Gmina: Zawichost
- Population (approx.): 690

Linów [ˈlinuf] is a village in the administrative district of Gmina Zawichost, within Sandomierz County, Świętokrzyskie Voivodeship, in south-central Poland. It lies approximately 7 km (4 mi) north-west of Zawichost, 21 km (13 mi) north of Sandomierz, and 84 km (52 mi) east of the regional capital Kielce.
