= Linów-Kolonia =

- Village
- Location within Poland
- Coordinates: 50°51′49″N 21°47′26″E
- Country: Poland
- Voivodeship: Świętokrzyskie
- County: Sandomierz
- Gmina: Zawichost

Linów-Kolonia [ˈlinuf kɔˈlɔɲa] is a village in the administrative district of Gmina Zawichost, within Sandomierz County, Świętokrzyskie Voivodeship, in south-central Poland. It lies approximately 8 km (5 mi) north-west of Zawichost, 21 km (13 mi) north of Sandomierz, and 83 km (52 mi) east of the regional capital Kielce.
