= Gmina Zawichost =

Gmina Zawichost Zawichost Commune
- Gmina
- Coat of arms

- Location within Poland
- Coordinates (Zawichost): 50°48′24″N 21°51′23″E
- Country: Poland
- Voivodeship: Świętokrzyskie
- County: Sandomierz
- Seat: Zawichost

Area
  - Total: 80.19 km^{2} (30.96 sq mi)

Population (2013)
  - Total: 4,620
  - Density: 57.6/km^{2} (149/sq mi)
  - Urban: 1,861
  - Rural: 2,759
- Website: https://www.zawichost.pl/

Gmina Zawichost is an urban-rural gmina (administrative district) in Sandomierz County, Świętokrzyskie Voivodeship, in south-central Poland. Its seat is the town of Zawichost, which lies approximately 16 kilometres (10 mi) north-east of Sandomierz and 88 km (55 mi) east of the regional capital Kielce.

The gmina covers an area of 80.19 square kilometres (31.0 sq mi), and as of 2006 its total population is 4,724 (out of which the population of Zawichost amounts to 1,853, and the population of the rural part of the gmina is 2,871).

== Villages ==
Apart from the town of Zawichost, Gmina Zawichost contains the villages and settlements of Chrapanów, Czyżów Plebański, Czyżów Szlachecki, Dąbie, Dziurów, Józefków, Kolecin, Linów, Linów-Kolonia, Pawłów, Piotrowice, Podszyn, Wygoda and Wyspa.

== Neighbouring gminas ==
Gmina Zawichost is bordered by the gminas of Annopol, Dwikozy, Ożarów and Radomyśl nad Sanem.
