= Dziurów, Sandomierz County =

Dziurów
- Village
- Location within Poland
- Coordinates: 50°48′47″N 21°47′38″E
- Country: Poland
- Voivodeship: Świętokrzyskie
- County: Sandomierz
- Gmina: Zawichost

Dziurów [ˈd͡ʑuruf] is a village in the administrative district of Gmina Zawichost, within Sandomierz County, Świętokrzyskie Voivodeship, in south-central Poland. It lies approximately 5 km (3 mi) west of Zawichost, 15 km (9 mi) north of Sandomierz, and 84 km (52 mi) east of the regional capital Kielce.
