= Krzysztof Szyga =

Polish politician

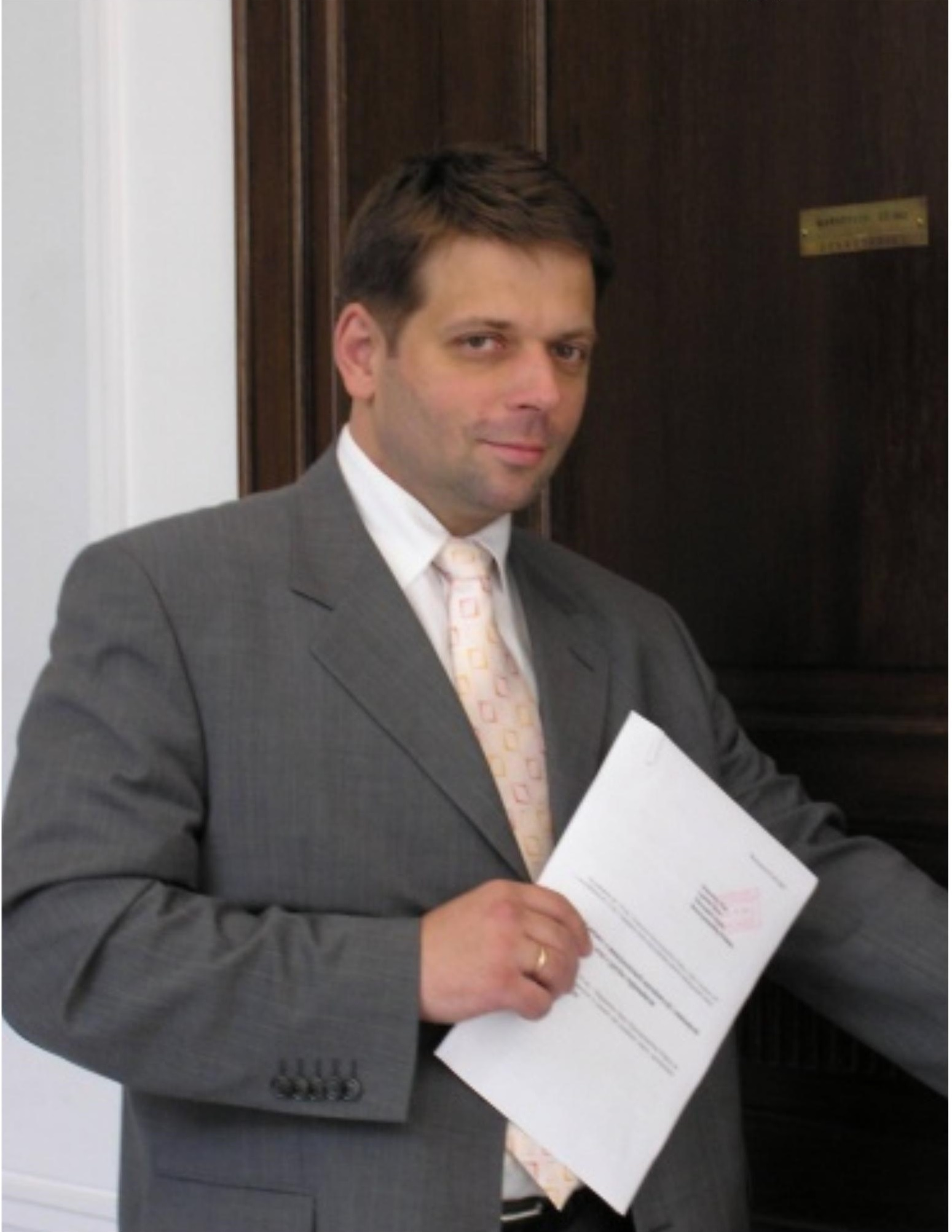

Member of the Sejm
- In office 19 October 2005 – 4 November 2007
- Constituency: 31 – Katowice

Personal details
- Born: February 6, 1966 (age 60) Katowice
- Party: Poland Comes First
- Other political affiliations: Civic Platform (2005–06); National People's Movement (2006–07)
- Education: Warsaw University of Technology
- Profession: Engineer

Krzysztof Michał Szyga (born 6 February 1966 in Katowice) is a Polish politician. He was elected to Sejm on 25 September 2005 getting 3,882 votes in 31 – Katowice, running for Civic Platform.

In 2011, he joined Poland Comes First.

== See also ==
- Members of Polish Sejm 2005-2007
