= Józef Cepil =

Polish politician (born 1960)

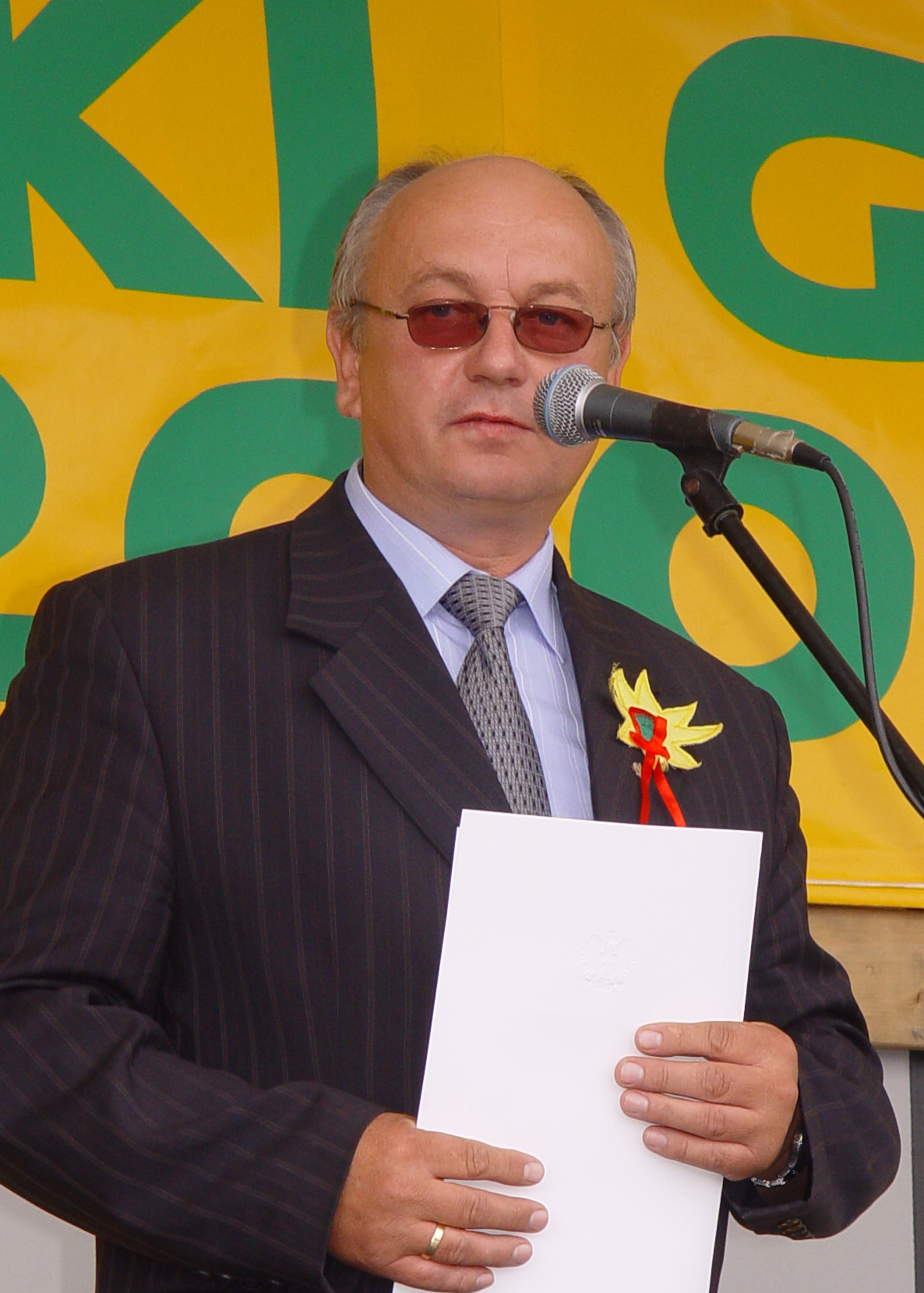

member of Sejm
- In office 2001–2007

Personal details
- Born: 19 March 1960 (age 66)
- Party: Samoobrona

Józef Cepil (born 19 March 1960 in Parchocin) is a Polish politician. He was elected to Sejm on 25 September 2005, getting 10526 votes in 33 Kielce district as a candidate from Samoobrona Rzeczpospolitej Polskiej list.

He was also a member of Sejm 2001-2005.

== See also ==
- Members of Polish Sejm 2005-2007
