= Jan Bestry =

Polish politician (born 1954)

Deputy of the V Sejm
- In office 2005 – 2007
- Constituency: 4 Bydgoszcz

Personal details
- Born: 18 May 1954 (age 72) Szczecin, Polish People's Republic
- Party: Samoobrona RP

Jan Bestry (born 18 May 1954 in Szczecin) is a Polish politician. He was elected to Sejm on 25 September 2005, getting 6941 votes in 4 Bydgoszcz district as a candidate from Samoobrona Rzeczpospolitej Polskiej list. Since his election he missed all of the votings (over 900) in the Sejm, and was elected on an Internet poll by Rmf fm listeners the most lazy deputy in history. As an "award", Bestry received an all expenses paid trip to a survival camp.

== See also ==
- Members of Polish Sejm 2005-2007
