= Marian Daszyk =

Polish politician (born 1961)

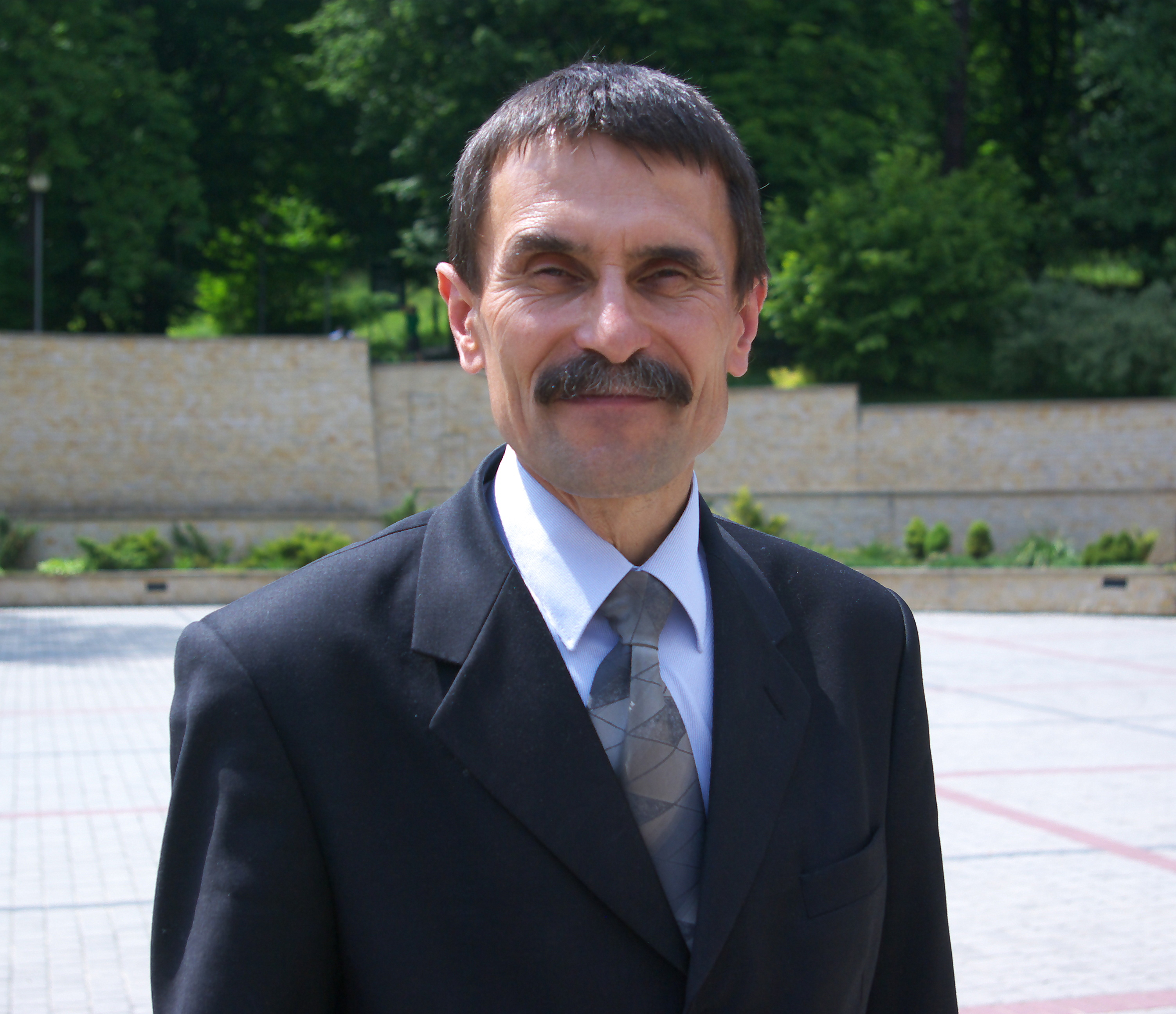
- Daszyk in 2014

Member of Sejm 2005-2007
- In office 25 September 2005 – 7 September 2007

Personal details
- Born: 9 May 1961 (age 65) Jurowce, Poland
- Party: Narodowe Koło Parlamentarne

Marian Józef Daszyk (born 9 May 1961) is a Polish politician. He was elected to the Sejm on 25 September 2005, getting 8276 votes in 22 Krosno district as a candidate from the League of Polish Families list.

== See also ==
- Members of Polish Sejm 2005-2007
