= Zawichost =

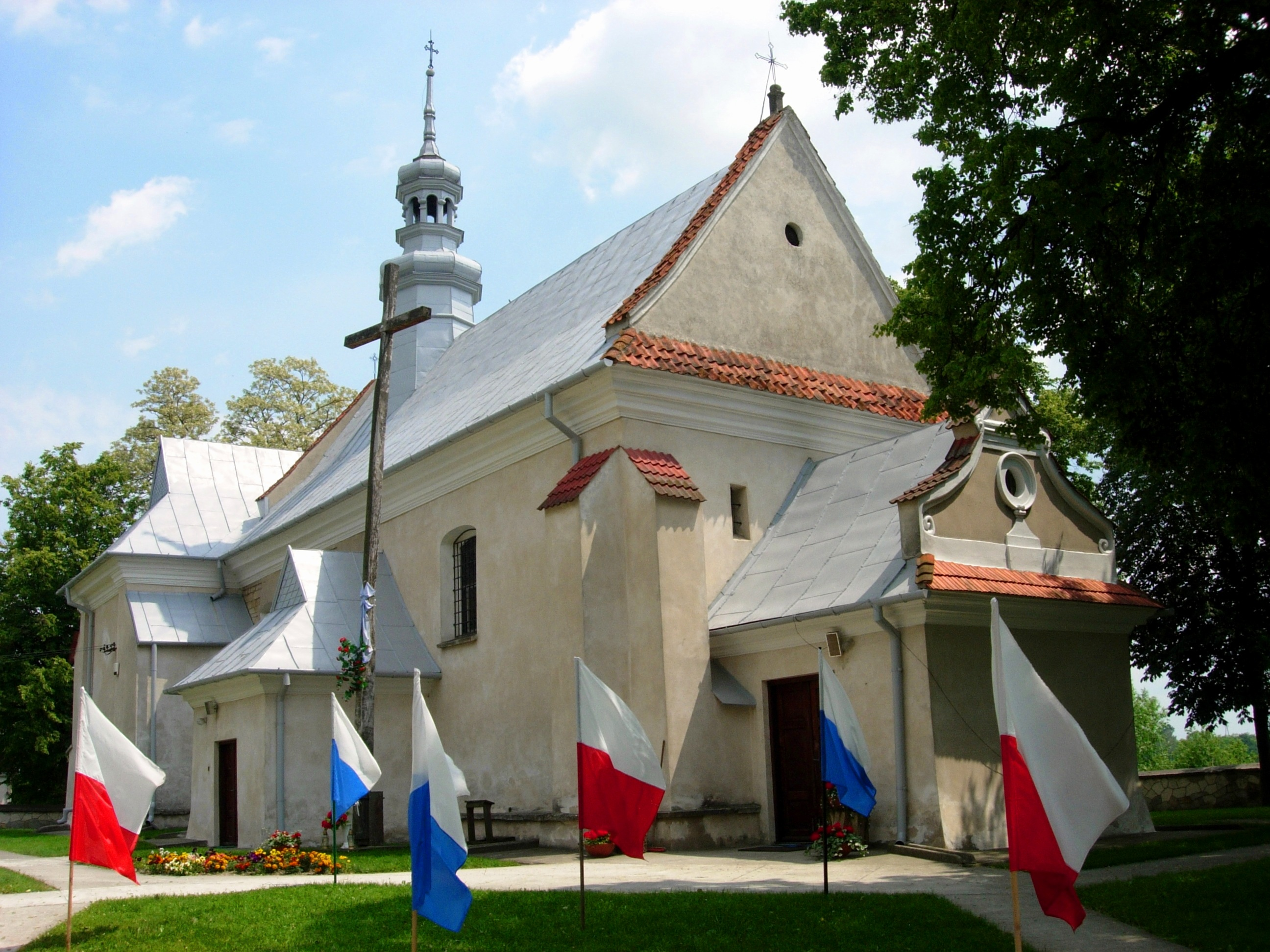
- Holy Trinity Church

- Coat of arms

- Location within Poland
- Coordinates: 50°48′24″N 21°51′23″E
- Country: Poland
- Voivodeship: Świętokrzyskie
- County: Sandomierz
- Gmina: Zawichost

Area
  - Total: 20.15 km^{2} (7.78 sq mi)

Population (2006)
  - Total: 1,853
  - Density: 91.96/km^{2} (238.2/sq mi)
- Postal code: 27-630
- Car plates: TSA
- Website: http://www.zawichost.pl/

Zawichost [zaˈvixɔst] is a town (ca. 1,800 inhabitants as of 2006) in Sandomierz County, Świętokrzyskie Voivodeship, Poland. It is located by the Vistula River in Lesser Poland, near Sandomierz. It is first mentioned in historical documents from around 1148. In 1205 the Battle of Zawichost was fought nearby. In 1241, 1259 and 1287 the town was ravaged by Mongol raids. Granted town rights before 1255, in the late Middle Ages it was one of the most important urban centers of Lesser Poland.

== Location ==
Zawichost is located in Lesser Poland, near the picturesque Lesser Polish Gorge of the Vistula. The town lies on left (western) bank of the Vistula, 17 kilometers northwest of Sandomierz. It does not have a bridge over the river, a ferry is used instead.

== History ==
The town was first mentioned in 1148. At that time it was the seat of a castellan, and a market center, located near the Vistula crossing. In 1205, the Battle of Zawichost was fought nearby, in which Roman the Great, prince of Kingdom of Galicia–Volhynia was defeated by Lesser Poland’s army of Leszek I the White, and Mazovian army of Konrad I of Masovia. It is not known when Zawichost was granted town rights, most probably it happened before 1255. In 1257, prince Bolesław V the Chaste gave the town together with 25 nearby villages to the Order of Poor Ladies. In the 14th century, Zawichost became a royal town and the seat of a starosta. King Kazimierz Wielki built a castle here, which guarded the Vistula crossing.

Like other towns in Leser Poland, Zawichost prospered in the 15th and 16th centuries. At that time, it was located along a merchant route from Kraków to the Grand Duchy of Lithuania, and profited from taxes on goods transported on the Vistula. In 1564 the town had a number of artisans, a town hall and 126 houses. Good times ended during the Deluge. Zawichost was ransacked and destroyed first by the Swedes (1655), and then by the Transilvanians of George II Rákóczi. The invaders burned the castle, which remained in ruins until 1813, when during a flood its walls collapsed into the Vistula. In 1666 Zawichost experienced a great fire and then a plague, in which most residents died. After all these misfortunes, the town never recovered. Furthermore, after the Partitions of Poland Zawichost was located near Russian - Austrian border, which hampered its development.

At the beginning of the 18th century, the town of Starostów (later known as Prosperów) was established near Zawichost. Most of its inhabitants were Jewish, and in 1820, Prosperów merged with Zawichost. Since then the division between the Polish town, and the Jewish town was established. In 1827, Zawichost had 281 houses (most of them wooden) and 2,320 inhabitants. In 1888 it lost its town rights and was reduced to the status of a village, to regain town privileges in 1926. During World War II, German occupiers opened a ghetto in Zawichost, with 5,000 Jews. Most of them were murdered in October 1942 at Bełżec death camp. In 1944, fierce fighting between the Wehrmacht and the Red Army took place in Zawichost, in which most of the town was destroyed.

== Point of interest ==
- Gothic church of John the Baptist (13th century), together with remains of a monastery, founded in 1245,
- parish church, originally Romanesque, rebuilt in the 19th century. In its cellar there are remains of the original church,
- Holy Trinity church (13th century), rebuilt in Baroque style,
- remains of the 11th-century Saint Maurice chapel, discovered by archeologists. The chapel was flooded by the Vistula,
