= Deputy Marshal of the Senate of Poland =

Position in the upper house of Polish parliament

Deputy Marshal of the Senate of the Republic of Poland
- Wicemarszałek Senatu Rzeczypospolitej Polskiej
- Presidum of the Senate
- Seat: Sejm and Senate Complex of Poland, Warsaw
- Appointer: The Senate
- Inaugural holder: Jakub Bojko, Jan Woźnicki, Antoni Stychel
- Formation: 1922

Deputy Marshal of the Senate of the Republic of Poland (Polish: Wicemarszałek Senatu RP) is one of the Polish Senators in the upper house of the Polish parliament who serves as the deputy of the Senate Marshal (speaker). There could be a maximum of four Deputy Marshals.

Deputy Marshals are allowed to preside over the Senate sessions when the Marshal does not preside.

They are elected among the Senators for a full Senate term, alongside the Marshal.

== List ==
=== 1st term (1989–1991) ===
- Zofia Kuratowska (Solidarity)
- Józef Ślisz (Solidarity)
- Andrzej Wielowieyski (Solidarity)

Under Marshal Andrzej Stelmachowski

=== 2nd term (1991–1993) ===
- Andrzej Czapski (Liberal Democratic Congress)
- Alicja Grześkowiak (Centre Agreement)
- Józef Ślisz (People's Christian Party)

Under Marshal August Chełkowski

=== 3rd term (1993–1997) ===
- Ryszard Czarny (Democratic Left Alliance)
- Stefan Jurczak (Solidarity)
- Zofia Kuratowska (Democratic Union, Freedom Union)
- Grzegorz Kurczuk (Democratic Left Alliance)

Under Marshal Adam Struzik

=== 4th term (1997–2001) ===
- Tadeusz Rzemykowski (Democratic Left Alliance)
- Donald Tusk (Freedom Union)
- Marcin Tyrna (Solidarity Electoral Action) – since 3 October 2000
- Andrzej Chronowski (Solidarity Electoral Action) – until 3 October 2000

Under Marshal Alicja Grześkowiak

=== 5th term (2001–2005) ===
- Jolanta Danielak (Democratic Left Alliance)
- Ryszard Jarzembowski (Democratic Left Alliance)
- Kazimierz Kutz (Senate 2001 coalition)

Under Marshal Longin Pastusiak

=== 6th term (2005–2007) ===
- Ryszard Legutko (Law and Justice)
- Maciej Płażyński (Independent)
- Krzysztof Putra (Law and Justice)
- Marek Aleksander Ziółkowski (Civic Platform) – since 22 December 2005

Under Marshal Bogdan Borusewicz

=== 7th term (2007–2011) ===
- Krystyna Bochenek (Civic Platform)-until 10 April 2010
- Marek Aleksander Ziółkowski (Civic Platform)
- Zbigniew Romaszewski (Law and Justice)
- Grażyna Sztark (Civic Platform)- since 17 November 2010

Under Marshal Bogdan Borusewicz

=== 8th term (2011–2015) ===
- Jan Wyrowiński (Civic Platform)
- Maria Pańczyk-Pozdziej (Civic Platform)
- Stanisław Karczewski (Law and Justice)

Under Marshal Bogdan Borusewicz

=== 9th term (2015–2019) ===
- Adam Bielan (Law and Justice)- until 28 May 2019
- Bogdan Borusewicz (Civic Platform)
- Grzegorz Czelej (Law and Justice)-until 20 April 2017
- Maria Koc (Law and Justice)
- Michał Seweryński (Law and Justice)-since 20 April 2017
- Marek Pęk (Law and Justice)- since 26 June 2019

Under Marshal Stanisław Karczewski

=== 10th term (2019–2023) ===
- Bogdan Borusewicz (Civic Platform)
- Michał Kamiński (Union of European Democrats)
- Stanisław Karczewski (Law and Justice) – until 13 May 2020
- Gabriela Morawska-Stanecka (Polish Socialist Party)
- Marek Pęk (Law and Justice) – since 13 May 2020

Under Marshal Tomasz Grodzki

=== 11th term (2023–2027) ===
- Rafał Grupiński (Civic Platform)
- Magdalena Biejat (Lewica Razem (2023–2024), independent (2024–present))
- Michał Kamiński (Union of European Democrats)
- Maciej Żywno (Poland 2050)

Under Marshal Małgorzata Kidawa-Błońska

== See also ==
- Deputy Marshal of the Sejm
