= Statue of Władysław Bartoszewski (Sopot) =

Monument in Warsaw, Poland

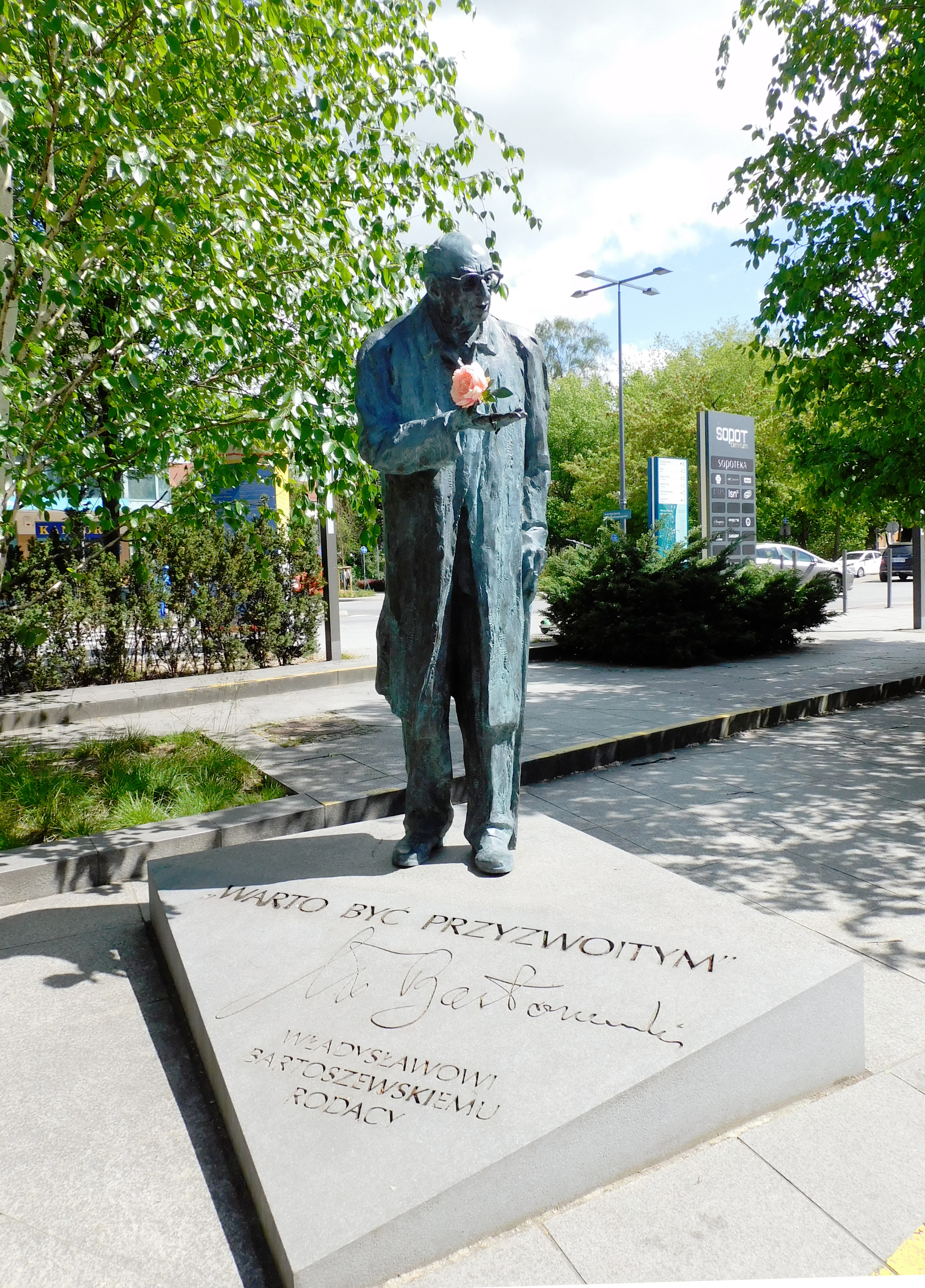
- The statue in 2022
- Interactive map of Statue of Władysław Bartoszewski
- Location: 12B Kościuszki Street, Lower Sopot, Sopot, Poland
- Coordinates: 54.441252°N 18.563362°E
- Designer: Jacek Kiciński
- Type: Statue
- Material: Bronze
- Height: 2.3 m (7 ft 7 in)
- Opening date: 5 July 2020
- Dedicated to: Władysław Bartoszewski

The statue of Władysław Bartoszewski (Polish pronunciation: [vwaˈdɘ̟.swaf bar.tɔˈʂɛf.skʲi]; Polish: Pomnik Władysława Bartoszewskiego) is a monument in Sopot, Poland, within the neighbourhood of Lower Sopot. The statue is placed at a small urban square at the intersection of Kościuszki and Chopina Streets, in front of the Sopot railway station and the mall Sopot Centrum, located at 12B Kościuszki Street. The monument was Jacek Kiciński and was unveiled on 5 July 2020. It has a form of a bronze statue depicting Władysław Bartoszewski, a 20th- and 21st-century academic, activist, writer, journalist, politician, and diplomat. In 1942, while Warsaw was under the German occupation during the Second World War, Bartoszewski joined the Home Army underground resistance, and the Council to Aid Jews, and in 1944, he fought in the Warsaw Uprising. After the war, he was the ambassador of Poland in Austria from 1990 to 1995, the Minister of Foreign Affairs of Poland from 1990 to 1995 and from 2000 to 2001, and the chairperson of the Council for the Protection of Struggle and Martyrdom Sites from 2001 to 2015.

== History ==
The monument was proposed by the Association It is Worth Being Decent, and financed by public donations, costing 200,000 Polish zloties. It was dedicated to Władysław Bartoszewski, a 20th- and 21st-century academic, activist, writer, journalist, politician, and diplomat. In 1942, while Warsaw was under the German occupation during the Second World War, he joined the Home Army underground resistance, and the Council to Aid Jews, and in 1944, he fought in the Warsaw Uprising. After the war, Bartoszewski was a lecturer at the John Paul II Catholic University of Lublin, Ludwig-Maximilians-Universität München, and University of Augsburg. He was the ambassador of Poland in Austria from 1990 to 1995, the Minister of Foreign Affairs of Poland from 1990 to 1995 and from 2000 to 2001, and the chairperson of the Council for the Protection of Struggle and Martyrdom Sites from 2001 to 2015. Bartoszewski was awarded with the Order of the White Eagle, and the title of the Righteous Among the Nations. He regularly visited Sopot, and in 2007, received the title of its honorary citizenship. The statue was designed by Jacek Kiciński, and unveiled on 5 July 2020. The ceremony was attended by Aleksander Kwaśniewski and Bronisław Komorowski, two former presidents of Poland, Donald Tusk, a former prime minister of Poland and the former president of the European Council, Jacek Karnowski, the mayor of Sopot, Aleksandra Dulkiewicz, the mayor of Gdańsk, Tomasz Grodzki, the marshal of the Senate, Bogdan Borusewicz, the deputy marshal of the Senate, Małgorzata Kidawa-Błońska, the deputy marshal of the Sejm, and Adam Bodnar, the Commissioner for Human Rights. It was also attended by Władysław Teofil Bartoszewski, a member of the Sejm and Władysław Bartoszewski's son.

== Characteristics ==
The bronze statue depicts Władysław Bartoszewski in an elderly age, wearing a longcoat and glasses. It is placed on a short pedestal, which features Bartoszewski's signature and his quote "Warto być przyzwoitym", which translates from Polish to "It is worth being decent". Below it, is also inscribed text that reads "Władysławowi Bartoszewskiemu; Rodacy", and transnaltes to "To Władysław Bartoszewski; the countrymen". The statue has a height of 2.3 m. It is placed at a small urban square at the intersection of Kościuszki and Chopina Streets, in front of the Sopot railway station and the mall Sopot Centrum, located at 12B Kościuszki Street.
