= Krzysztof Putra =

Polish politician

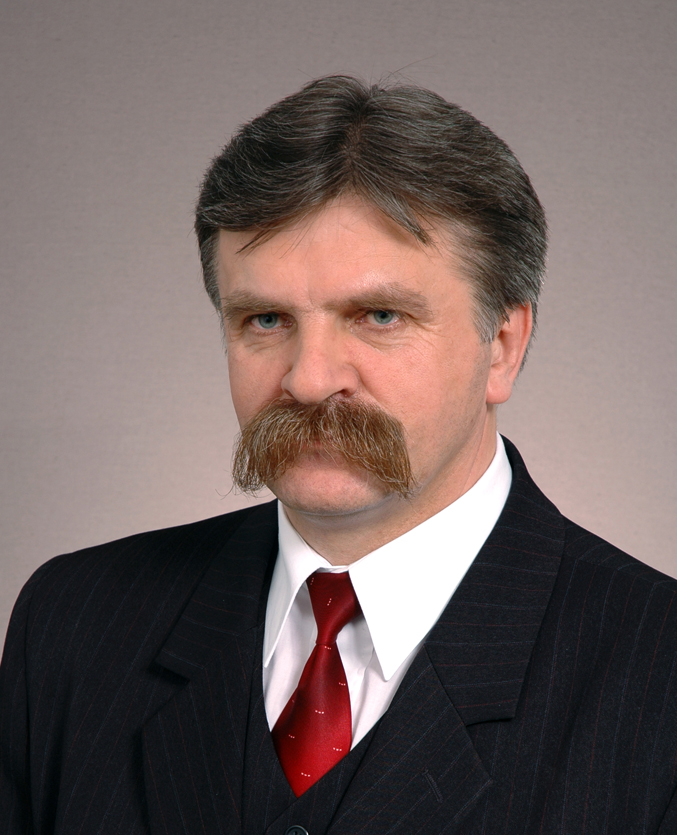

Deputy Marshal of the Senate of the Republic of Poland
- In office 27 October 2005 – 5 November 2007; Served alongside: Ryszard Legutko, Maciej Płażyński, Marek Aleksander Ziółkowski
- Preceded by: Jolanta Danielak, Kazimierz Kutz, Ryszard Jarzembowski
- Succeeded by: Krystyna Bochenek, Janusz Ziółkowski

Deputy Marshal of the Sejm
- In office 6 November 2007; Serving alongside: Jarosław Kalinowski, Stefan Niesiołowski, Jerzy Szmajdziński – 10 April 2010
- Preceded by: Janusz Dobrosz, Jarosław Kalinowski, Bronisław Komorowski, Wojciech Olejniczak, Genowefa Wiśniowska

Member of the Sejm
- In office 5 November 2007 – 10 April 2010
- Constituency: 24 – Białystok

Personal details
- Born: 4 July 1957 Józefowo, Poland
- Died: 10 April 2010 (aged 52) Smolensk, Russia
- Party: Law and Justice
- Other political affiliations: Centre Agreement (1990–2001)
- Spouse: Elżbieta Putra
- Profession: Worker, politician

Krzysztof Jakub Putra GCM (Polish pronunciation: [ˈkʂɨʂtɔf ˈputra], 4 July 1957 – 10 April 2010) was a Polish politician, a member of the Law and Justice (PiS). He served as a Deputy of the Senate Marshal from 27 October 2005 until 4 November 2007. He later became a Sejm member (from 5 November) and PiS candidate for Sejm Marshal.

== Biography ==
Putra was born in Józefowo, Suwałki County. He was a grandson of Aleksander Putra, who served as Sejm Member before World War II from Polish People's Party.

A member of Solidarity during Communist rule, he was a worker in Białystok from 1975 to 1994. He was also a Sejm Member (Contract Sejm) from Solidarity (1989–1991). Later he was elected from Centre Agreement and was one of the founder of Law and Justice in 2001. He is known as one of the Party leader, in addition to serve as party leader in his home Podlaskie Voivodeship.

As one of the Deputies of the Senate Marshal he was regarded as a de facto leader of the upper house.

He was picked by the Law and Justice and their candidate for Sejm Marshal. However, he lost soundly to Civic Platform's majority nominee Bronisław Komorowski. His candidature was viewed as a political demonstration; however, he was elected one of the Vice-Marshals a day later.

He was married and had eight children.

In 2008 he was awarded the Grand Cross of the Order of Merit.

He was listed on the flight manifest of the Tupolev Tu-154 of the 36th Special Aviation Regiment carrying the President of Poland Lech Kaczyński which crashed near Smolensk North Airport near Pechersk near Smolensk, Russia, on 10 April 2010, killing all aboard.

On 16 April 2010, Putra was posthumously awarded the Commander's Cross with Star of the Order of Polonia Restituta and on April 20, 2010 he was buried at St. Roch's Church in Białystok.
