= Solidarność (disambiguation) =

"Solidarność" is a Polish trade union.

Solidarność, meaning solidarity in Polish, may also refer to:

- NSZZ RI „Solidarność”, a farmers' faction of the wider Solidarność movement
- Solidarność Walcząca, a 1982-1992 faction of the wider Solidarność movement
- Solidarność (video game), a 1991 strategy video game
- Solidarność: Menedżer Konspiracji, a 2013 educational video game
- Tygodnik Solidarność or TySol, a magazine
- Radio Solidarność or Radio S, a 1982-1989 underground radio station
- Solidarność Airport, an airport in Szczecin
