= Józef Ślisz =

Józef Ślisz (born 20 March 1934 in Łukawiec, died 6 March 2001 in Łąka) was a Polish farmer and politician. He served as a senator (1989–1993) and Deputy Marshal of the Senate (1989–1993).

== Biography ==
Ślisz graduated from the Konarski Secondary School in Rzeszów in 1952. In 1952–1961, he worked in an industrial plant before becoming a farmer. He was a co-organizer of the Rural Solidarity trade union in latach 1980–1981 and the organizer of the 1981 peasant strikes. He was a co-signatory of the Rzeszów-Ustrzyce agreements (19 February 1981), which allowed for the creation of an independent rural trade union.

Following the delegalization of Rural Solidarity as part of the martial law in Poland, he again became a co-organizer of the trade union at the end of the 1980s. In 1987–1989, he chaired the Temporary National Council of the rural union.

Ślisz took part in the Round Table talks. In 1989–1993 he served as a senator first representing the Solidarity Citizens' Committee and then PSL Peasants' Agreement. During this time he also served as the Deputy Marshal of the Senate.

Since 1990, he was a leader of PSL "Solidarity", which in 1992 transformed into the Christian-Peasant Party. Later, he was an activist for the Conservative People's Party.

He was buried on 10 March 2001 in Łąka, with Prime Minister Jerzy Buzek, Maciej Płażyński and Alicja Grześkowiak attending his funeral.
