= Mieczysław Palus =

Polish hockey player

- Born: August 31, 1921 Zaczernie, Poland
- Died: May 15, 1986 (aged 64) Warsaw, Poland
- Height: 5 ft 10 in (178 cm)
- Weight: 159 lb (72 kg; 11 st 5 lb)
- Position: Left wing
- Played for: Pogoń Lwów; Spartak Lviv; Wisła Krakow; Cracovia; Legia Warsaw
- National team: Poland
- Playing career: 1938–1941; 1946–1957

Mieczysław Palus (31 August 1921 – 15 May 1986) was a Polish ice hockey player. He played for Pogoń Lwów, Spartak Lviv, Wisła Krakow, Cracovia, and Legia Warsaw during his career. He won the Polish league championship in 1949 with Cracovia, and seven more times from 1951 to 1957 with Legia. Palus also played for the Polish national team at the 1948 Winter Olympics, and the 1947 World Championship. He served as a co-coach for Poland at the 1956 Winter Olympics.
