= Zbigniew Romaszewski =

Polish politician (1940–2014)

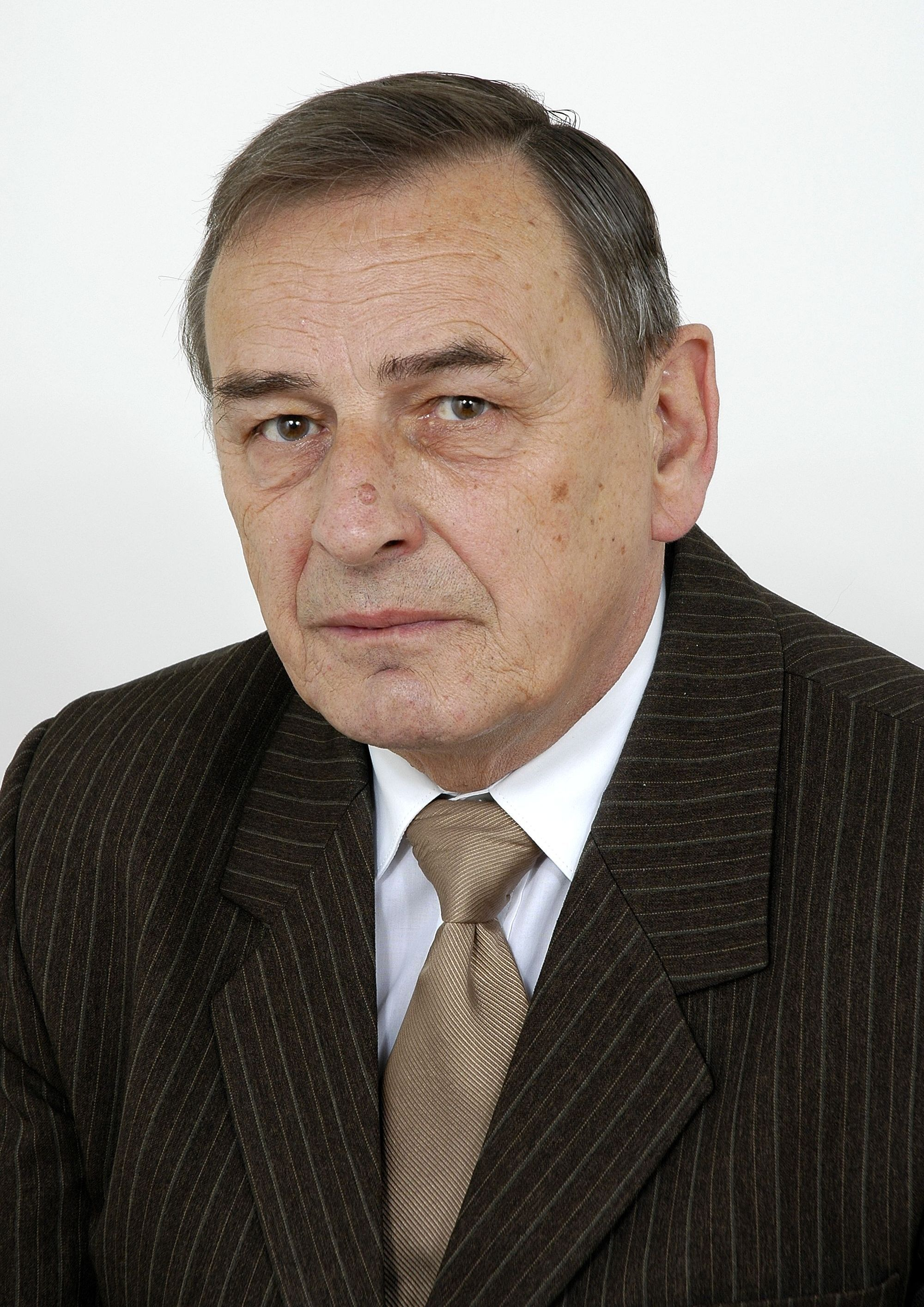

Vice Marshal of the Senate
- In office 28 November 2007 – 7 November 2011 Serving with Marek Aleksander Ziółkowski; Krystyna Bochenek
- Preceded by: Ryszard Legutko; Maciej Płażyński; Krzysztof Putra; Marek Aleksander Ziółkowski
- Succeeded by: Maria Pańczyk-Pozdziej; Jan Wyrowiński; Stanisław Karczewski

Member of Senate
- In office 4 July 1989 – 7 November 2011

Personal details
- Born: 2 January 1940 Warsaw, Poland
- Died: 13 February 2014 (aged 74) Warsaw, Poland
- Party: Law and Justice
- Education: University of Warsaw

Zbigniew Jan Romaszewski (2 January 1940 – 13 February 2014) was a Polish conservative politician, and human rights activist. He was involved in opposition activities against the communist government in Poland and later served in the Senate of Poland.

Romaszewski was born in Warsaw during the Second World War. During the war, members of his family were imprisoned in Nazi concentration camps. His father died at the Sachsenhausen concentration camp and his grandmother died at Ravensbrück . Romaszewski himself was imprisoned at Ravensbrück and later worked in a labor camp before being liberated by forces under George S. Patton. After the war, he was raised primarily by his mother and aunt.

Romaszewski studied physics at the University of Warsaw, and later earned a doctorate in physics from the Polish Academy of Sciences. In 1957, he met Zofia Romaszewska, whom he later married. Both participated in student and political activities during the post-Stalin political thaw in Poland.

After the June 1976 protests he was cofounder of assurance to workers prosecuted by communist regime. He was one of the founders of the Workers' Defence Committee (KOR). He became Chief of Bureau of Intervention of the Committee for Social Self-defence KOR in 1977. In 1979 knew Andrej Sacharov. In 1980 he was the founder of the Helsinki Committee in Poland. In 1980-1981 he was chief of Commission of Intervention and Law-abidingness of Solidarity. During martial law in Poland he established independent Radio Solidarity. In 1982 he was arrested and jailed by the Communist regime until 1984.

In 2007 he was elected to the Senate from the electoral list of Law and Justice. From 28 November 2007 he was deputy marshal of Polish Senate.

He died at age 74 in a hospital in Warsaw, after a week of induced coma.
