= Statue of Achille Ratti =

Sculpture in Warsaw, Poland

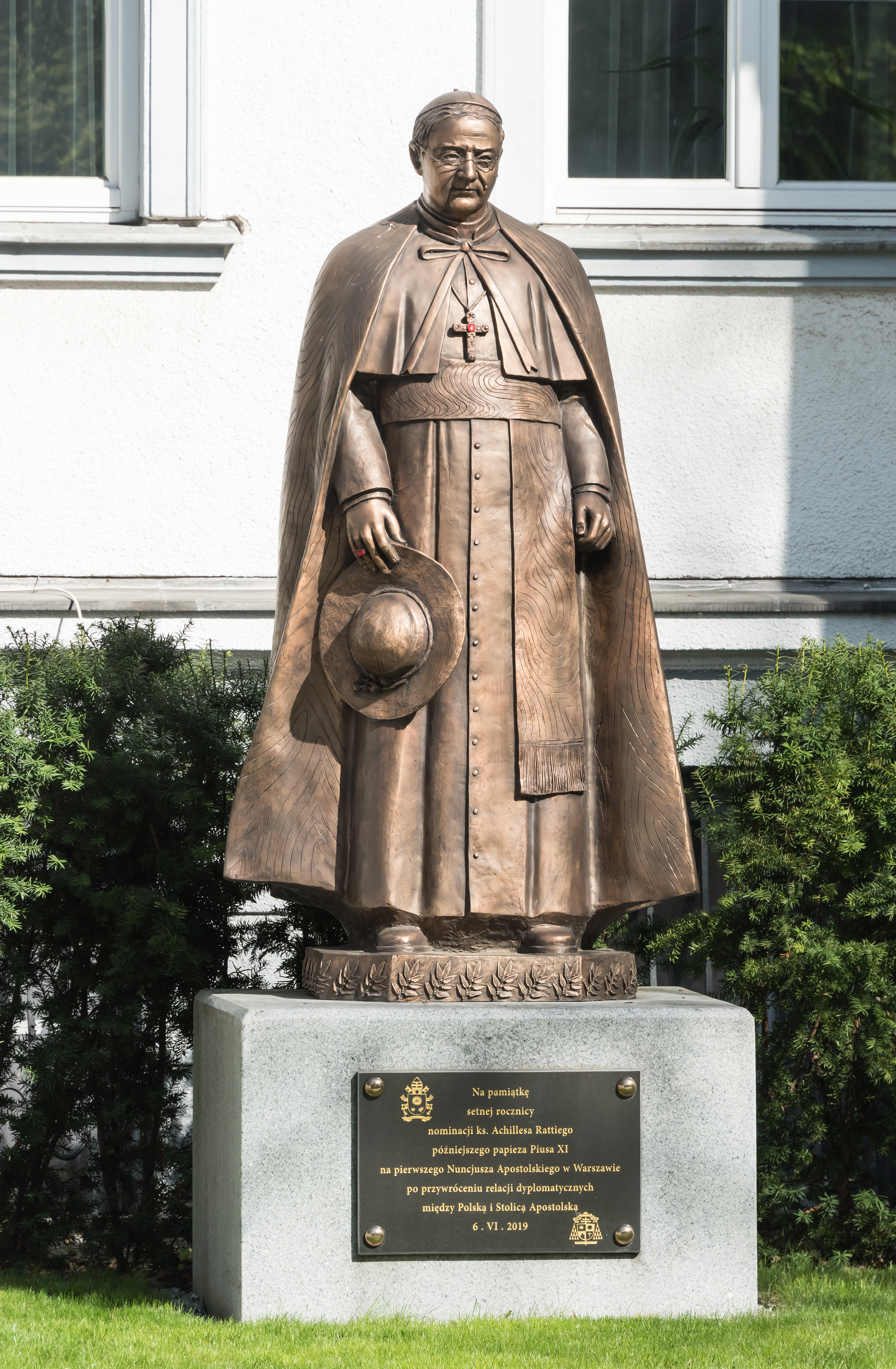
- The sculpture in 2023.
- Interactive map of Statue of Achille Ratti
- Location: 12 Szuch Avenue, Downtown, Warsaw, Poland
- Coordinates: 52°12′54.75″N 21°01′22.97″E
- Designer: Armado Benato
- Type: Statue
- Opening date: 6 June 2019
- Dedicated to: Pope Pius XI

The statue of Achille Ratti (Italian pronunciation: [aˈkille ˈratti]; Polish: Pomnik Achillesa Rattiego), also known as the statue of Pope Pius XI (Polish: Pomnik papieża Piusa XI) is a statue in Warsaw, Poland, placed in front of the Apostolic Nunciature to Poland at 12 Szuch Avenue in the neighbourhood of Ujazdów within the Downtown district. It depicts Pope Pius XI, the head of the Catholic Church from 1922 to 1939, and the apostolic nuncio to Poland from 1919 to 2021. The sculpture was designed Armado Benato and unveiled on 6 June 2019.

== History ==
The monument, dedicated to Pope Pius XI, was designed by Italian-based sculptor Armado Benato, and unveiled on 6 June 2019, in the 100th anniversary of him, then still priest Achille Ratti, becoming the first apostolic nuncio to the Second Polish Republic, an office which he served from 1919‍9 to 1921. It was placed in front of the Apostolic Nunciature to Poland at 12 Szuch Avenue. The unveiling ceremony was attended by Stanisław Karczewski, the Marshal of the Senate of Poland, Edgar Peña Parra, the Substitute for the Secretariat of State for the Holy See, Salvatore Pennacchio, the apostolic nuncio to Poland, Wojciech Polak, the Primate of Poland, and Kazimierz Nycz, the Archbishop of Warsaw.

== Overview ==
The statue depicts Pope Pius XI, wearing a cassock girded with a stole, and holding a galero hat in his right hand near his legs. It stands on a pedestal which features a commemorative plaque with the following inscription:

Polish text

Na pamiątkę setnej rocznicy nominacji ks. Achillesa Rattiego, późniejszego papieża Piusa XI, na pierwszego Nuncjusza Apostolskiego w Warszawie po przywróceniu relacji między Polską a Stolicą Apostolską

Translation:
English translation

Commemorating the 100th anniversary of the nomination of priest Achille Ratti, the later Pope Pius XI, for the first Apostolic Nuncio in Warsaw following the restoration of the relations between Poland and the Holy See
