= Danielak =

Danielak is a surname. Notable people with the surname include:

- Jolanta Danielak (born 1955), Polish politician
- Karol Danielak (born 1991), Polish footballer
