= Wólka Podleśna =

- Village
- Location within Poland
- Coordinates: 50°07′05″N 22°06′43″E
- Country: Poland
- Voivodeship: Subcarpathian
- County: Rzeszów
- Gmina: Trzebownisko
- Population: 1,500

Wólka Podleśna [ˈvulka pɔdˈlɛɕna] is a village in the administrative district of Gmina Trzebownisko, within Rzeszów County, Subcarpathian Voivodeship, in south-eastern Poland.
