= Terliczka =

- Village
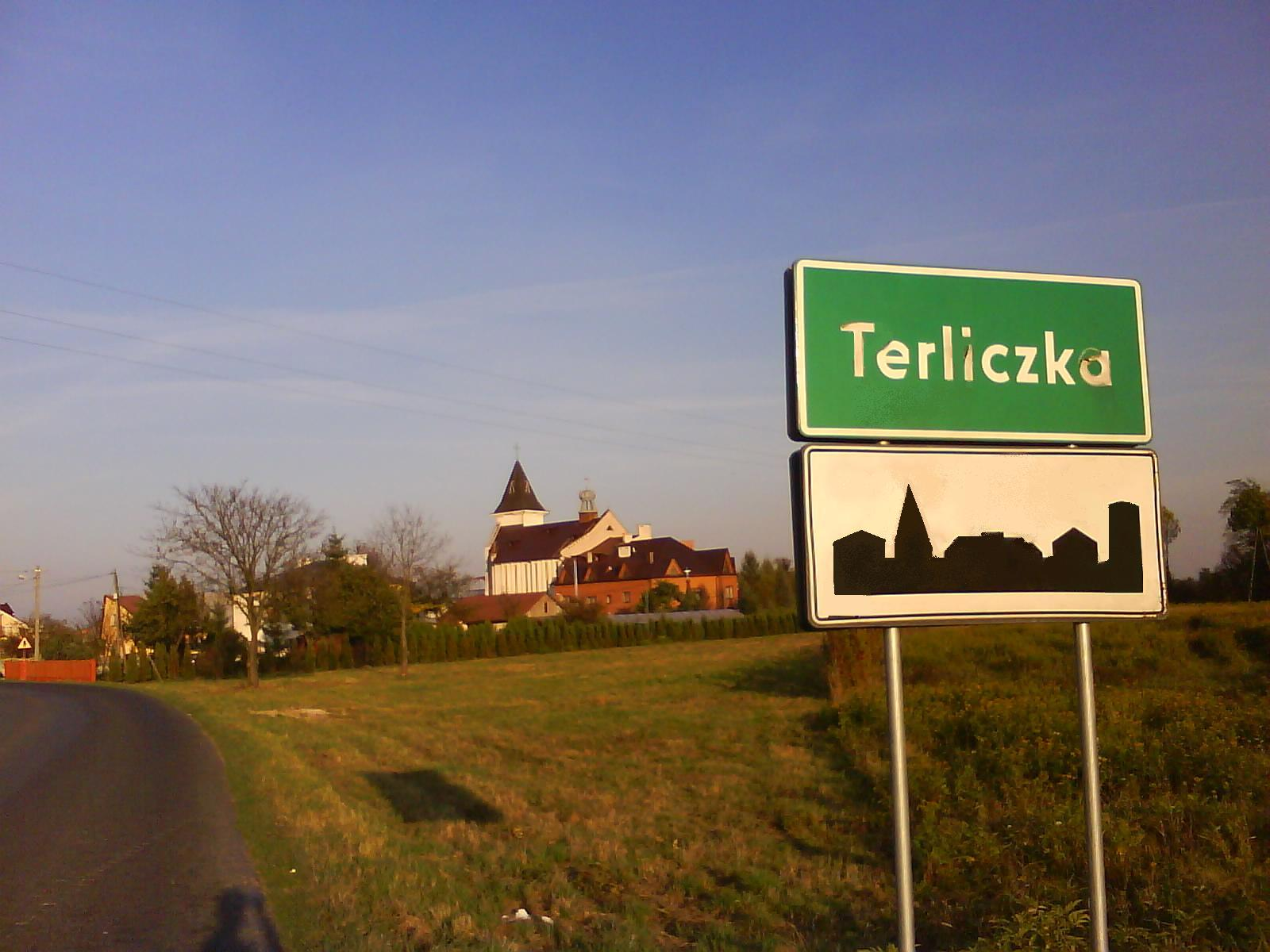

- Location within Poland
- Coordinates: 50°6′N 22°5′E
- Country: Poland
- Voivodeship: Subcarpathian
- County: Rzeszów
- Gmina: Trzebownisko

Terliczka [tɛrˈlit͡ʂka] is a village in the administrative district of Gmina Trzebownisko, within Rzeszów County, Subcarpathian Voivodeship, in south-eastern Poland.
