= August Chełkowski =

Polish physicist and politician (1927–1999)

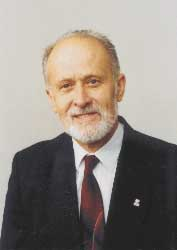

Marshal of the Senate
- In office 23 December 1991 – 15 October 1993
- Preceded by: Andrzej Stelmachowski
- Succeeded by: Adam Struzik

Personal details
- Born: 27 February 1927 Telkwice, East Prussia, German Reich
- Died: 31 October 1999 (aged 72) Warsaw, Poland
- Party: Solidarity
- Profession: Physicist

August Chełkowski (Polish pronunciation: [ˈauɡust xɛwˈkɔfskʲi], 27 February 1927 – 31 October 1999) was a prominent Polish physicist and politician.

Born in the small village of Telkwice, then in East Prussia (then a part of Weimar Republic) he was a son of Franciszek Chełkowski, a wealthy landowner and prominent activist of the Polish community in Prussia and his wife Emilia (maiden name Mieczkowska). He was related to a number of other Polish activists by his maternal side.

He was a 1948 graduate of the prestigious Karol Marcinkowski Lycee in Poznań (commonly known as Marcinek) and Adam Mickiewicz University in Poznań. He earned his MSc degree (magister) in physics in 1952 and his PhD (doktorat) in 1958.

Although he was a Poznanian, he relocated permanently to Katowice in 1967, together with a number of other scientists from Poznan. In 1968, when the University of Silesia was established, Chelkowski, along with other scientists from Poznan, established that University's Physics Institute, which was named after him in 2000.

He went to become a professor of the University of Silesia in Katowice in 1973 and a higher ranking professor (professor zwyczajny) in 1990.

He served as the Rector of the University of Silesia in Katowice from 1 September 1981 until 12 January 1982, when he was dismissed by the then minister of higher education for political reasons.

He was an author of a number of works on physics.

In 1980 he became a member of the Solidarity and an active figure of the opposition. He was the only president of any Polish university to be arrested during the Martial Law.

After the fall of communism, he was elected to the Senate from the Solidarity list and served until his death.

He served as a Senate Marshal during Senate 2nd term (23 December 1991 – 16 October 1993).
