= Solidarność (video game) =

1991 video game

- Developer: P.Z.Karen Co.
- Publisher: California Dreams
- Release: 1991

Solidarność is a 1991 Polish strategy computer game developed by P.Z.Karen Co. under the direction of Przemysław Rokita and published by California Dreams. It was created by Polish programmers specifically for an American audience in order to support a Hollywood film about the life of Lech Wałęsa, which was never actualised. The game never gained popularity and remains virtually unknown to this day.

== Development ==
Solidarność gameplay

In 1989, Przemysław Rokita left the Warsaw University of Technology and two years later he became a full-time employee of PZ Karen in the "export software" department. Located in a rented studio in Warsaw's Żoliborz, the PZKaren Co. Development Group was in charge of software development for the American and Western European market. In 1990, the Solidarność project came along, and he became the manager, main programmer, and game logic concept author.

== Gameplay and plot ==
Set in Poland in the 1980s, the player takes the role of the leader of an illegal union, and aims to gain more support in 7 regions than the Communists. The player achieves this through speeches, printing leaflets, organizing demonstrations and strikes. The 7 regions that Poland is divided into are called: Pomerania, Northeastern, Greater Poland, Mazovia, Lower Silesia, Upper Silesia, and Lesser Poland.

== Critical reception ==
Gry Online felt the game had a "thought-out visual frame" and represented the transition in gaming production between the 1980s and 1990s. Eurogamer thought that even by 2015 the game was absorbing, and that players soon forgot about the "archaic layout". Komputer Świat said that while the title is not commonly known and remembered, it is a very important topic within Polish video gaming history.

The game is unrelated to the educational title Solidarność: Menedżer Konspiracji.
