= Longin Pastusiak =

Polish politician and historian (1935–2025)

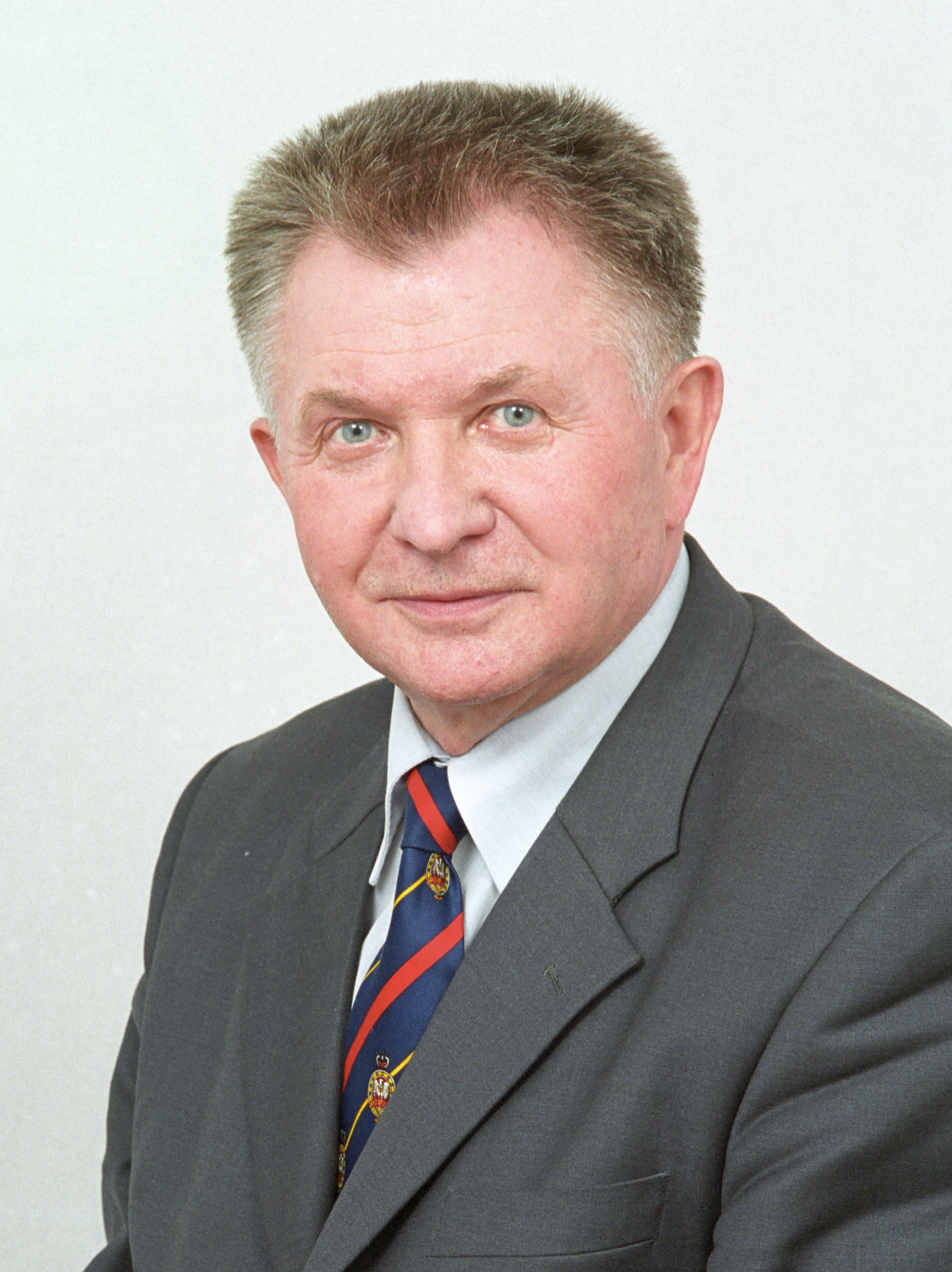
- Pastusiak in 2001

Marshal of the Senate
- In office 20 October 2001 – 18 October 2005
- Preceded by: Alicja Grześkowiak
- Succeeded by: Bogdan Borusewicz

Member of Sejm
- In office 25 November 1991 – 19 October 2001

Member of Senate
- In office 20 October 2001 – 18 October 2005

Personal details
- Born: Longin Hieronim Pastusiak; 22 August 1935 Łódź, Poland
- Died: 10 January 2025 (aged 89)
- Party: Democratic Left Alliance
- Other political affiliations: Polish United Workers' Party (1961–1990)
- Spouse: Anna Ochab
- Profession: Historian, author

Longin Hieronim Pastusiak (pronounced [ˈlɔnɡin pasˈtuɕak]; 22 August 1935 – 10 January 2025) was a Polish politician and historian.

== Academic career ==
In 1959 Pastusiak earned his Master of Arts degree from Woodrow Wilson School of Public and International Affairs, University of Virginia in Charlottesville. Then in 1960 he received his Master of Arts degree from the Faculty of Journalism, Warsaw University.

From 1961 to 1962 Pastusiak studied for a doctorate at the American University in Washington, D.C. He received a PhD from the Faculty of History, Higher School of Social Sciences in Warsaw (1963). In 1967 he earned the title of Doctor Habilitated from the Institute of History, Polish Academy of Sciences. In 1978 he gained the title of Associate Professor, then in 1986 the title of Full Professor.

From 1963 to 1994 Pastusiak was a researcher at the Polish Institute of International Affairs. He was also a visiting professor at several foreign universities, mainly American. He was a professor at Gdańsk University (on leave of absence). Between 1997 and 1999 he was president of the Warsaw School of Social and Economic Sciences. He was also a member of the Political Science Committee of the Polish Academy of Sciences and the author of over 600 scientific publications including more than 60 books on international relations.

From 1967 to 1998 Pastusiak was a member of the Central Board of the Polish Political Sciences Association. He was chair of the Association during three annual terms. From 1988 to 1994 he was a member of the Executive Committee of the International Political Sciences Association. He was vicepresident of the Association from 1991 to 1994. He was former president of the Polish Canadian Society, deputy president of the Poland – Republic of Korea Society and member of the Euro-Atlantic Society and the Club of Rome. Pastusiak was in 2008 a visiting professor at Appalachian State University in Boone, North Carolina.

As a historian, much of his works are related to Polish-American relations.

=== Selected works ===
- 2001 – Anegdoty prezydenckie (Presidential Anecdotes), Wyd. Bellona, ISBN 83-11-09922-7
- 2003 – Prezydenci amerykańscy wobec spraw polskich (American Presidents and Polish Affairs), Wyd. Bellona, ISBN 83-11-09585-X
- 2004 – George W. Bush jaki człowiek, jaki prezydent? (George W. bush: What Man, What President?), Wyd. Adam Marszałek, ISBN 978-83-7322-815-3
- 2005 – Prezydenci Stanów Zjednoczonych Ameryki (Presidents of the United States of America), Wyd. Iskry, ISBN 83-207-1783-3
- 2006 – Biały dom i jego mieszkańcy (The White House and Its Inhabitants), Wyd. Oficyna Wydawniczo-Poligraficzna ADAM, ISBN 83-7232-716-5
- 2009 – Romanse prezydentów USA (Romances of the Presidents of the USA), Wyd. Oficyna Wydawniczo-Poligraficzna ADAM, ISBN 978-83-7232-835-9

== Political career ==
From 1991 to 2001 Pastusiak was Deputy to the Polish Sejm. During its 1st and 2nd term he was Deputy Chairman of the Parliamentary Club of the Democratic Left Alliance. During its 3rd term he was Deputy Chairman of the Sejm Foreign Affairs Committee and Chairman of the Sejm and Senate Standing Delegation to the Assembly of the Western European Union. Since 1998 he was Vice-chairman of the International Council of the organisation Parliamentarians for Global Action based in New York. From 2000 he was Chairman of the Sub-Committee for Transatlantic Relations of the NATO Parliamentary Assembly. From 2001 he was Deputy Chairman of the Social-Democratic Faction in the NATO Parliamentary Assembly.

From 1961 until its dissolution Pastusiak was a member of the Polish United Workers' Party. In 1995 he became a member of the Democratic Left Alliance. From 2000 he was a member of the Supreme Council of the Democratic Left Alliance.

From 2002 to 2004, Pastusiak served as vice president of NATO Parliament Assembly and from 2001 until 2005 he was Marshal of the Senate of the Polish Republic.

== Death ==
Pastusiak died on 10 January 2025, at the age of 89.
