= Jasionka, Rzeszów County =

Jasionka
- Village
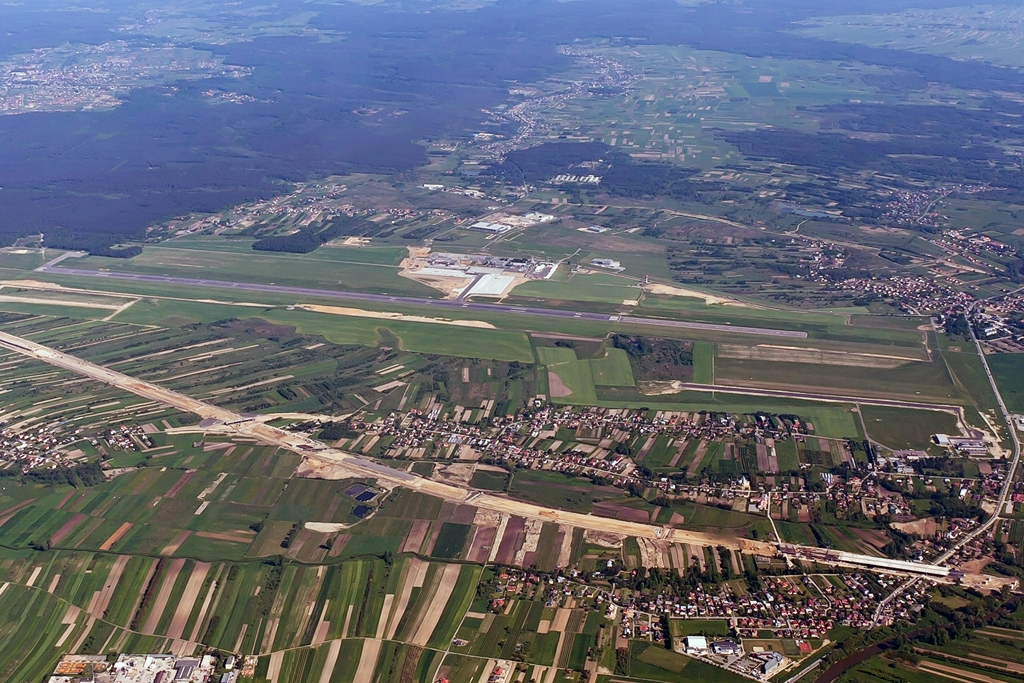

- Location within Poland
- Coordinates: 50°6′54″N 22°3′19″E
- Country: Poland
- Voivodeship: Subcarpathian
- County: Rzeszów
- Gmina: Trzebownisko

Population
  - Total: 2,713
- Time zone: UTC+1 (CET)
  - Summer (DST): UTC+2 (CEST)
- Vehicle registration: RZE

Jasionka (Polish pronunciation: [ja'śonka]) is a village in the administrative district of Gmina Trzebownisko, within Rzeszów County, Subcarpathian Voivodeship, in south-eastern Poland.
