= Gmina Trzebownisko =

Gmina Trzebownisko Trzebownisko Commune
- Gmina
- Flag Coat of arms
- Interactive map of Gmina Trzebownisko
- Coordinates (Trzebownisko): 50°5′N 22°3′E
- Country: Poland
- Voivodeship: Subcarpathian
- County: Rzeszów County
- Seat: Trzebownisko

Area
  - Total: 90.53 km^{2} (34.95 sq mi)

Population (2006)
  - Total: 18,836
  - Density: 208.1/km^{2} (538.9/sq mi)
- Website: http://www.trzebownisko.pl/

Gmina Trzebownisko is a rural gmina (administrative district) in Rzeszów County, Subcarpathian Voivodeship, in south-eastern Poland. Its seat is the village of Trzebownisko, which lies approximately 7 kilometres (4 mi) north-east of the regional capital Rzeszów.

The gmina covers an area of 90.53 square kilometres (35.0 sq mi), and as of 2006 its total population is 18,836.

== Villages ==
Gmina Trzebownisko contains the villages and settlements of Jasionka, Łąka, Łukawiec, Nowa Wieś, Stobierna, Tajęcina, Terliczka, Trzebownisko, Wólka Podleśna and Zaczernie.

== Neighbouring gminas ==
Gmina Trzebownisko is bordered by the city of Rzeszów and by the gminas of Czarna, Głogów Małopolski, Krasne and Sokołów Małopolski.
