= Adam Struzik =

Polish medical doctor and politician

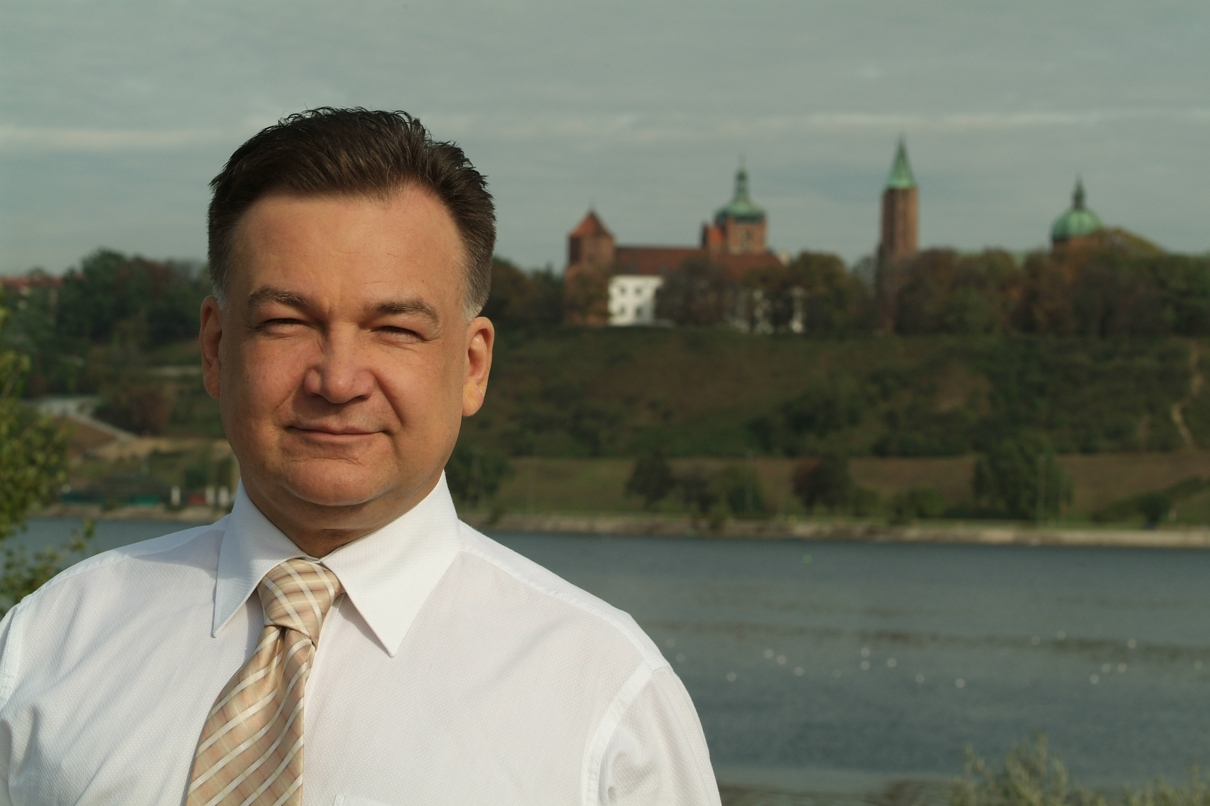

Marshal of Masovian Voivodeship
- Incumbent
- Assumed office 1 December 2001
- Preceded by: Zbigniew Kuźmiuk

Marshal of the Senate
- In office 26 October 1993 – 19 October 1997
- Preceded by: August Chełkowski
- Succeeded by: Alicja Grześkowiak

Personal details
- Born: 1 January 1957 (age 69) Kutno, Poland
- Party: United People's Party (1984-1989); Polish People's Party (1989-)
- Education: Medical Academy of Łódź; University of Warsaw
- Profession: Doctor

Adam Krzysztof Struzik (born 1 January 1957 in Kutno, Poland) is a Polish medical doctor and politician, serving as the current Marshal of Masovian Voivodeship since December 2001. Struzik previously served as Marshal of the Polish Senate between 1993 and 1997.
