= Tajęcina =

- Village
- Location within Poland
- Coordinates: 50°8′N 22°2′E
- Country: Poland
- Voivodeship: Subcarpathian
- County: Rzeszów
- Gmina: Trzebownisko

Tajęcina [tajɛnˈt͡ɕina] is a village in the administrative district of Gmina Trzebownisko, within Rzeszów County, Subcarpathian Voivodeship, in south-eastern Poland.
