= Marek Pęk =

Polish lawyer and politician

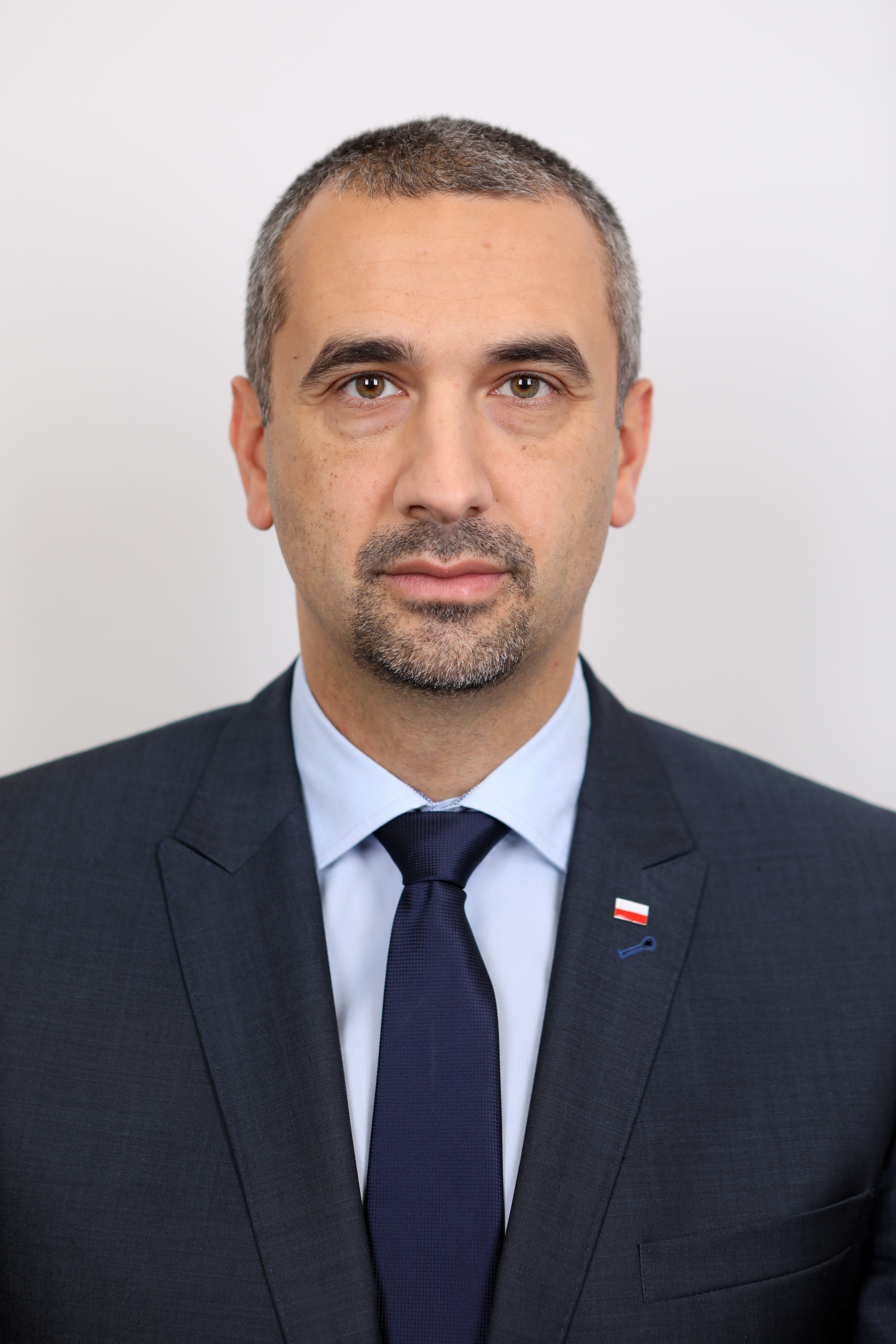

Deputy Marshal of the Senate
- In office 13 May 2020 – 12 November 2023
- In office 26 June 2019 – 11 November 2019

Member of Senate
- Incumbent
- Assumed office 12 November 2015

Personal details
- Born: August 8, 1975 (age 51) Rzeszów, Poland
- Party: Law and Justice
- Children: 3
- Education: Jagiellonian University
- Profession: Lawyer, politician

Marek Pęk (born 8 August 1975) is a Polish lawyer and politician.

== Biography ==
Marek Pęk graduated from the Faculty of Law and Administration of the Jagiellonian University (2001). In 2006 he completed post-graduate studies in European law. He dealt with legal advice in the field of, among others business law and public procurement. He was also a consultant for deputies and MEPs.

In 2006 and 2014 he unsuccessfully ran on the Law and Justice list for the Lesser Poland Regional Assembly. Pęk was the Law and Justice candidate for the Polish Senate in Kraków in 2015 Polish parliamentary election. He defeated Artur Baranowski of the Civic Platform party, Włodzimierz Okrajek of the Polish People's Party and independent Leszek Pawłowicz, with Pęk receiving 49,90% of the vote. In the previous term, his father Bogdan Pęk was a senator from this constituency, who did not appear on the Law and Justice electoral lists again and did not seek re-election. On June 26, 2019, he was elected Deputy Marshal of the Polish Senate in place of Adam Bielan, who became a member of the European Parliament. He ceased to perform this function after the end of the 9th term Senate.

In 2019 parliamentary election he was reelected as Member of Senate. After the resignation of Stanisław Karczewski from the function of Deputy Marshal, Marek Pęk replaced him on this function. He was elected 13 May 2020 and served until the 12 November 2023.
