= Trzebownisko =

- Village
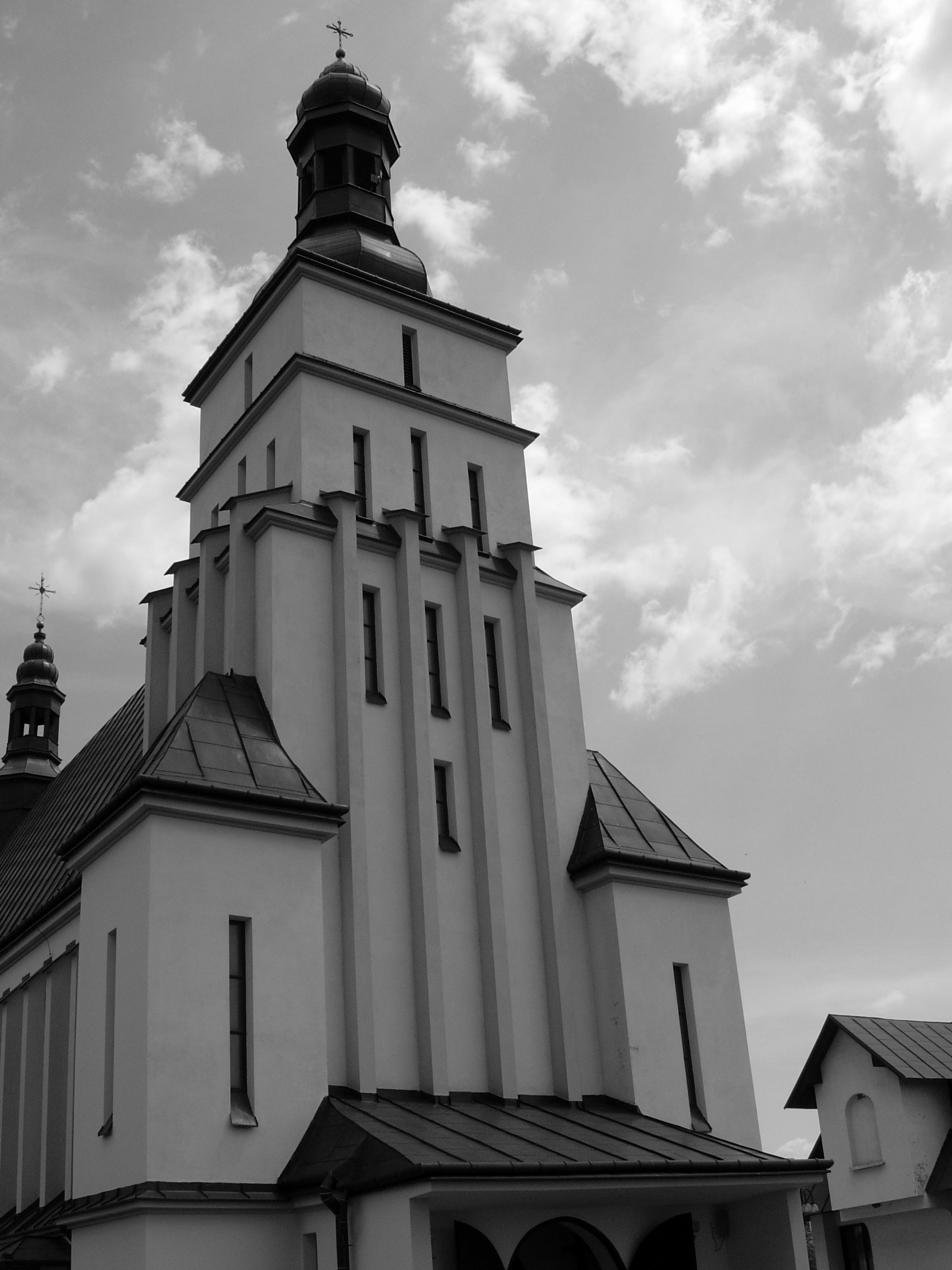

- Location within Poland
- Coordinates: 50°5′N 22°3′E
- Country: Poland
- Voivodeship: Subcarpathian
- County: Rzeszów
- Gmina: Trzebownisko
- Elevation: 200 m (660 ft)

Population
  - Total: 3,082
- Time zone: UTC+1 (CET)
  - Summer (DST): UTC+2 (CEST)
- Website: http://www.naszetrzebownisko.wist.com.pl

Trzebownisko [tʂɛbɔvˈɲiskɔ] is a village in Rzeszów County, Subcarpathian Voivodeship, in south-eastern Poland. It is the seat of the gmina (administrative district) called Gmina Trzebownisko.

Five Polish citizens were murdered by Nazi Germany in the village during World War II.
