= Bogdan Borusewicz =

Polish politician (born 1949)

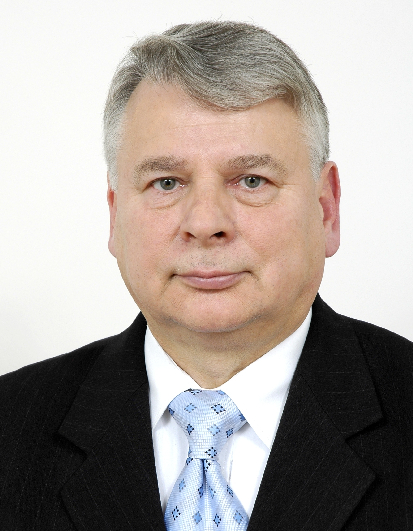
- Official portrait, 2015

Acting President of Poland
- In office 8 July 2010 – 8 July 2010
- Prime Minister: Donald Tusk
- Preceded by: Bronisław Komorowski (acting)
- Succeeded by: Grzegorz Schetyna (acting)

Marshal of the Senate
- In office 20 October 2005 – 11 November 2015 Serving with See List
- Preceded by: Longin Pastusiak
- Succeeded by: Stanisław Karczewski

Deputy Marshal of the Senate
- In office 12 November 2015 – 12 November 2023
- Marshal: Stanisław Karczewski; Tomasz Grodzki

Member of Sejm
- In office 25 November 1991 – 18 October 2001

Member of the Senate
- Incumbent
- Assumed office 19 October 2005
- Constituency: 24 - Gdańsk (2005–2011); 65 - Gdańsk (2011–)

Personal details
- Born: Bogdan Michał Borusewicz; 11 January 1949 (age 77) Lidzbark Warmiński, Poland
- Party: Independent (2005–present); Civic Platform caucus (2007–present)
- Other political affiliations: Democratic Union (1990–1994); Freedom Union (1994–2005); Law and Justice caucus (2005–2007)
- Spouse: Alina Pienkowska (deceased)
- Children: 2
- Education: John Paul II Catholic University of Lublin
- Profession: Historian

Bogdan Michał Borusewicz (Polish pronunciation: [ˈbɔɡdan ˈmixaw bɔruˈsɛvit͡ʂ]; born 11 January 1949) is a Polish politician who served as the Marshal of the Polish Senate from 20 October 2005 to 11 November 2015. Borusewicz was a democratic opposition activist under the Communist regime, a member of the Polish parliament (Sejm) for three terms and first Senate Marshal to serve two terms in this office. He served as the Acting President of Poland for a few hours in 2010.

== Democratic opposition in communist Poland ==
Borusewicz was born in Lidzbark Warmiński, Poland. When still a secondary school student of School of Fine Arts in Gdynia, he was arrested in May 1968 during the Polish 1968 political crisis on charges of printing and distributing opposition fliers.

In 1975, he graduated from the Catholic University of Lublin in the field of history. During the 1970s he took part in a campaign of support for striking workers in Radom, and became a part of the Workers' Defence Committee. In the years 1977–1978 he was a co-organiser of the Free Trade Unions of the Coast, "the cradle of Solidarity," established by Andrzej Gwiiazda, Krzysztof Wyszkowski and Antoni Sokolowski.

He was the point of contact for the opposition in Gdansk—a recruiting and networking role similar to Jacek Kuron in Warsaw—and a principal organiser of the August 1980 strike in the Gdańsk Shipyard which led to the formation of the Solidarity trade union, and a co-author of the strikers postulates. He took part in the formation of the Solidarity free trade union.

After the institution of martial law by the regime on 13 December 1981, he spent more than four years hiding from the authorities and organising the underground structures of the then-outlawed Solidarity trade union. In 1983, he secretly married fellow activist Alina Pienkowska, an underground event cited in Andrzej Wajda's Man of Iron starring Lech Walesa and Anna Walentynowicz. The following year, disguised as a woman, he attended the baptism of their daughter Kinga. Between 1984 and 1986, he was a member of the Provisional Solidarity Coordination Committee and then Provisional Solidarity Trade Union Council. He was arrested and imprisoned in 1986 and released under an amnesty in 1988. He supported the May and August strikes in the Gdańsk Shipyard in that year but, along with many Solidarity leaders, he initially opposed the round table compromise believing communism would crumble.

== In democratic Poland ==
Borusewicz was deputy chairman of the Solidarity trade union movement in 1990 and 1991. He was also a candidate for its chairmanship in February 1991.

Between 1991 and 2001, Borusewicz was a member of parliament (Sejm). In the first term (1991–1993), the leader of the Solidarity party, and the chairman of the commission studying the consequences of the Martial Law period. He was opposed to the vote of no confidence for the Suchocka government (against the position of the Solidarity trade union), and after its fall left Solidarity. In the following elections, he was elected as a member of the Democratic Union party, which in 1994 became the Freedom Union (UW). He was the chairman of the special forces parliamentary committee. During the third term (1997–2000) in the Jerzy Buzek government, he was the Deputy Minister of Internal Affairs and Administration (in charge of the police force). He resigned when the UW left the government coalition in 2000. He was also a member of a variety of other parliamentary commissions.

Borusewicz was not elected again in 2001. From October 2001, he was a member of the board of management of Pomorze province. Next year, Borusewicz was a candidate for the presidency of Gdańsk but lost the elections (obtaining 16.32% of votes). He did not join the Democratic Party (organised by UW members as a broader grouping), being opposed to the inclusion of politicians associated with the postcommunist Democratic Left Alliance party.

=== Senator and Marshal ===
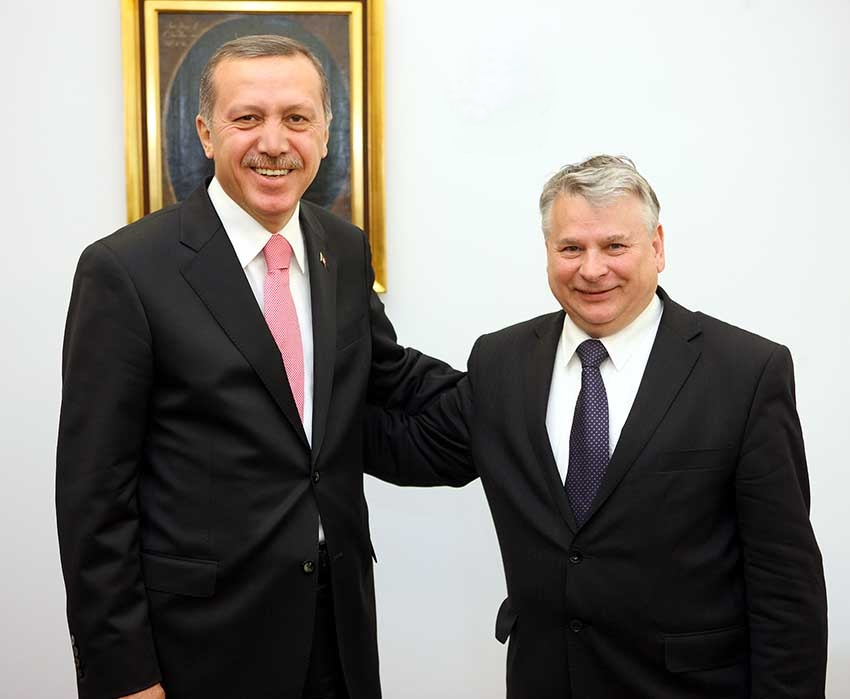
Marshal Bogdan Borusewicz with then-Turkish Prime Minister Recep Tayyip Erdoğan

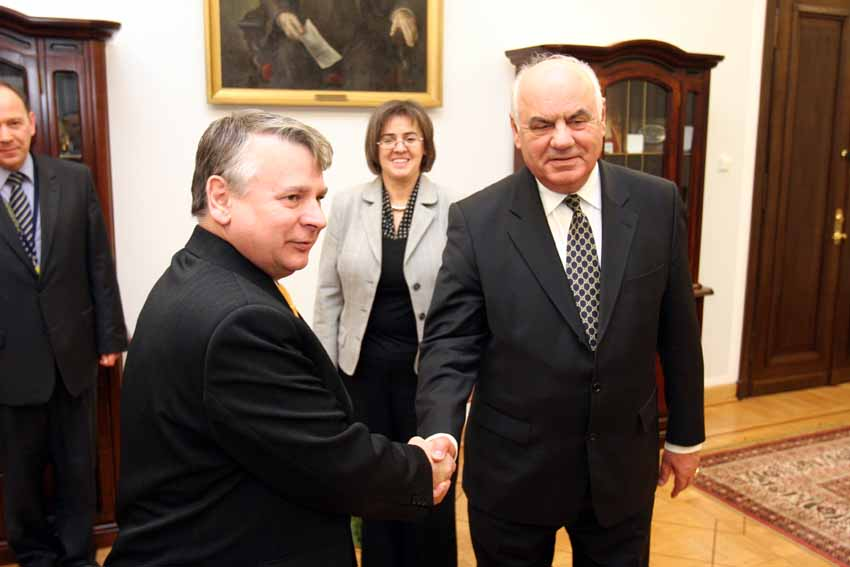
Marshal Bogdan Borusewicz with Albanian President Alfred Moisiu

He was chosen a senator in the 2005 parliamentary election, running as an independent but supported by both the Law and Justice (PiS) and Civic Platform (PO) parties. He was chosen as the Marshal (Speaker) of the Senate with their support. In his first term he caucused with PiS and after the 2007 parliamentary election, with PO. After Parliamentary election in 2015 Civic Platform went into opposition and Borusewicz became Deputy Marshal of the Senate. He served as the Deputy Marshal of the Senate for two terms until November 2023.

=== Acting President ===
Following Acting President, and President-elect Bronisław Komorowski resignation from Sejm (and thus Marshal's office) on 8 July 2010, Borusewicz became Acting President of Poland until the election of the new Marshal of Sejm Grzegorz Schetyna. Borusewicz was the first Senate Marshal to become a temporary head of state and the shortest-serving Polish head of state since 1918. Also, he was already the second person to be or act as president since President Lech Kaczyński's death in April 2010.

Called by the Polish media "The President for One Day", Borusewicz said, "at least I'll end up as a question in quizzes".

== Awards ==
In 2009 Borusewicz received the Dr. Rainer Hildebrandt Human Rights Award endowed by Alexandra Hildebrandt. The award is given annually in recognition of extraordinary, non-violent commitment to human rights.

Political offices
Preceded by Longin Pastusiak	Marshal of the Senate; 2005–2015	Succeeded by Stanisław Karczewski
Preceded by Bronisław Komorowski; Acting	Acting President of Poland; 2010	Succeeded by Grzegorz Schetyna; Acting
