= Nowa Wieś, Rzeszów County =

Nowa Wieś
- Village
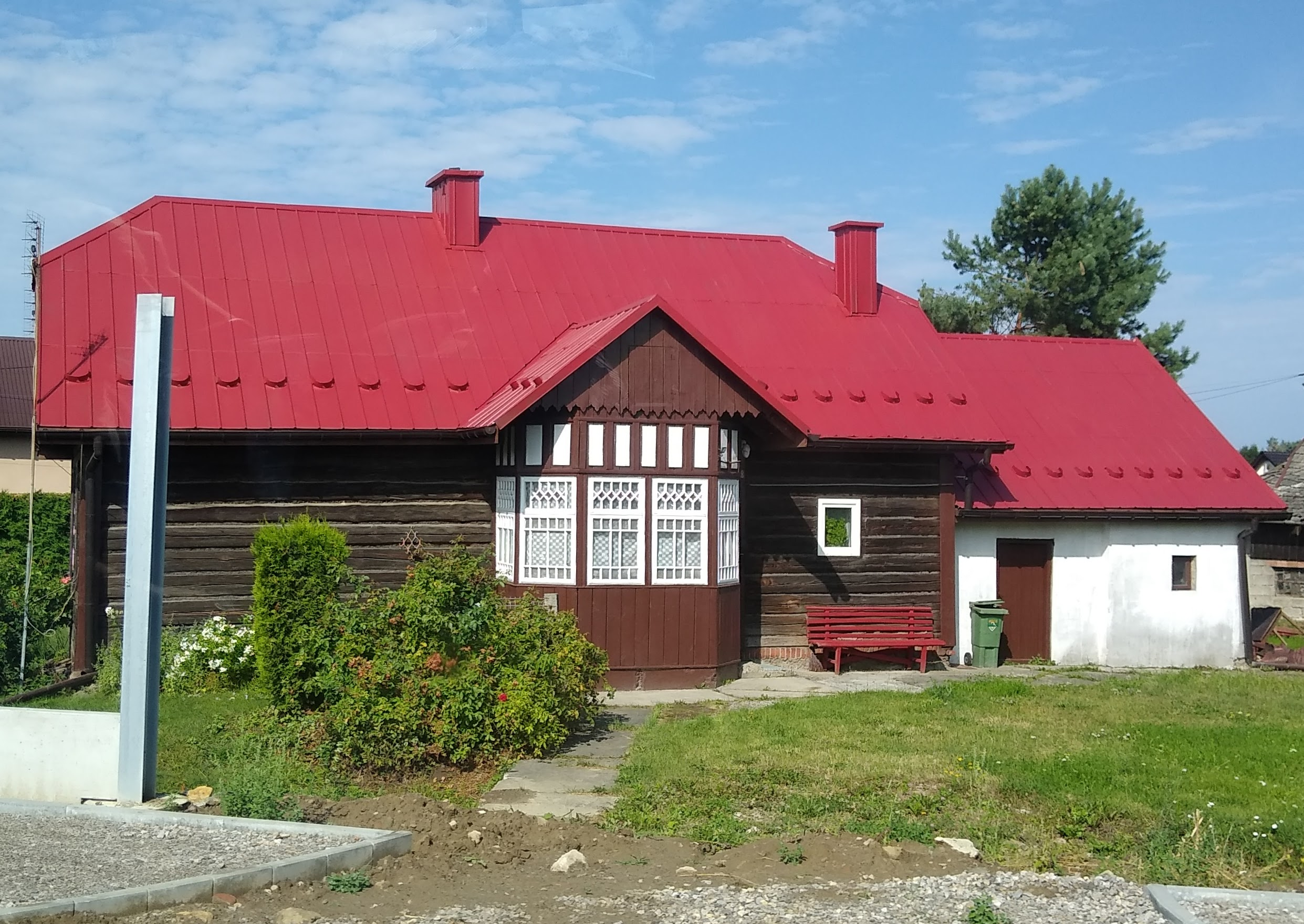

- Location within Poland
- Coordinates: 50°05′49″N 22°02′43″E
- Country: Poland
- Voivodeship: Subcarpathian
- County: Rzeszów
- Gmina: Trzebownisko
- Population: 1,249

Nowa Wieś [ˈnɔva ˈvjɛɕ] is a village in the administrative district of Gmina Trzebownisko, within Rzeszów County, Subcarpathian Voivodeship, in south-eastern Poland.
