= 1948–49 Polska Liga Hokejowa season =

Polish ice hockey season

The 1948–49 Polska Liga Hokejowa season was the 14th season of the Polska Liga Hokejowa, the top level of ice hockey in Poland. Four teams participated in the final round, and Ogniwo Kraków won the championship.

== Final Tournament ==
	Club	GP	Goals	Pts
1.	Ogniwo Kraków	3	8:6	5
2.	KTH Krynica	3	15:7	4
3.	Legia Warszawa	3	5:13	2
4.	Sila Giszowiec	3	5:7	1
