= Łąka, Podkarpackie Voivodeship =

Łąka
- Village
- Location within Poland
- Coordinates: 50°5′9″N 22°5′47″E
- Country: Poland
- Voivodeship: Subcarpathian
- County: Rzeszów
- Gmina: Trzebownisko
- Population: 1,700

Łąka [ˈwɔŋka] is a village in the administrative district of Gmina Trzebownisko, within Rzeszów County, Subcarpathian Voivodeship, in south-eastern Poland.
