= Radio Solidarity =

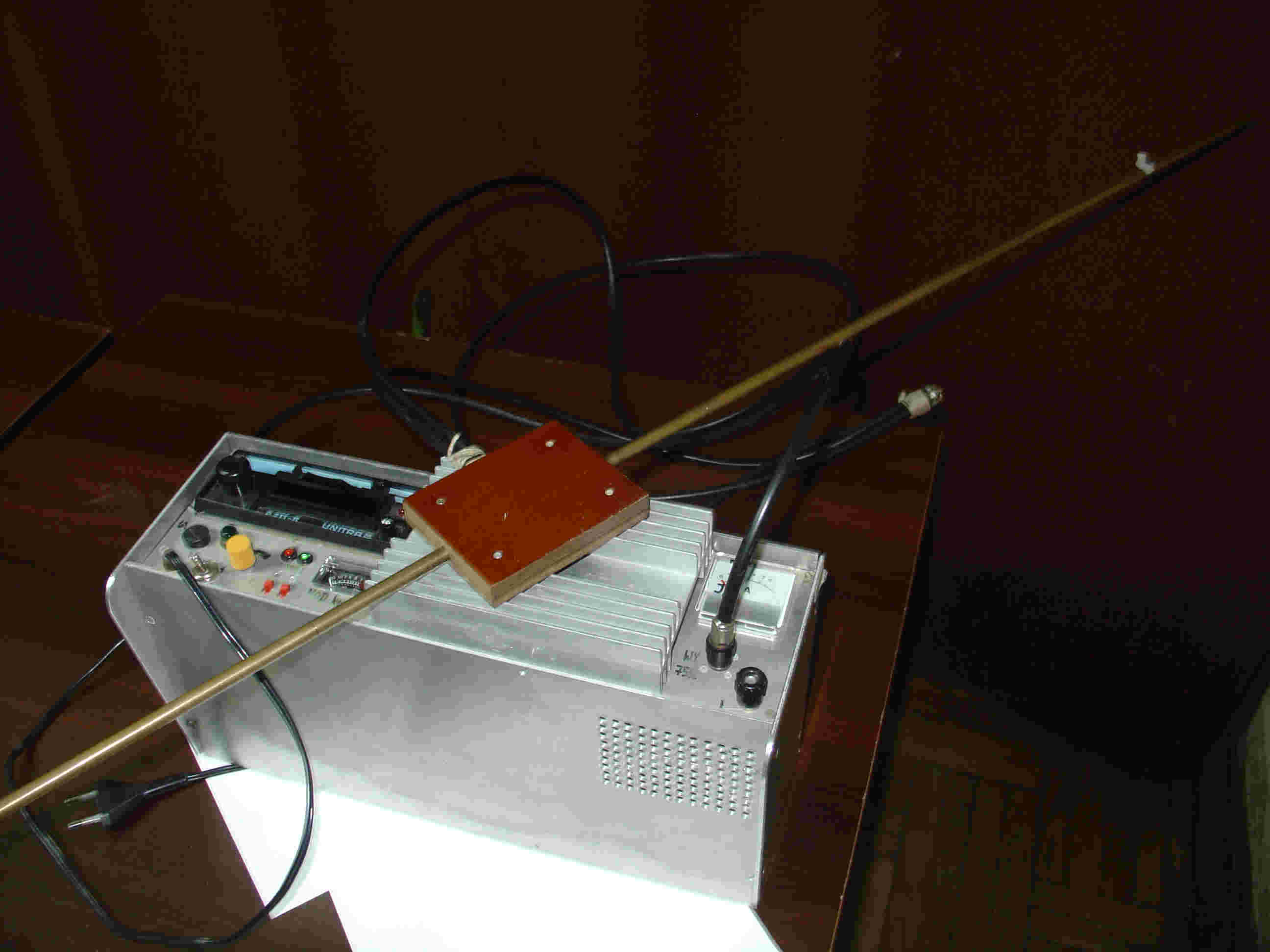
Berta - one of the most successful transmitting sets

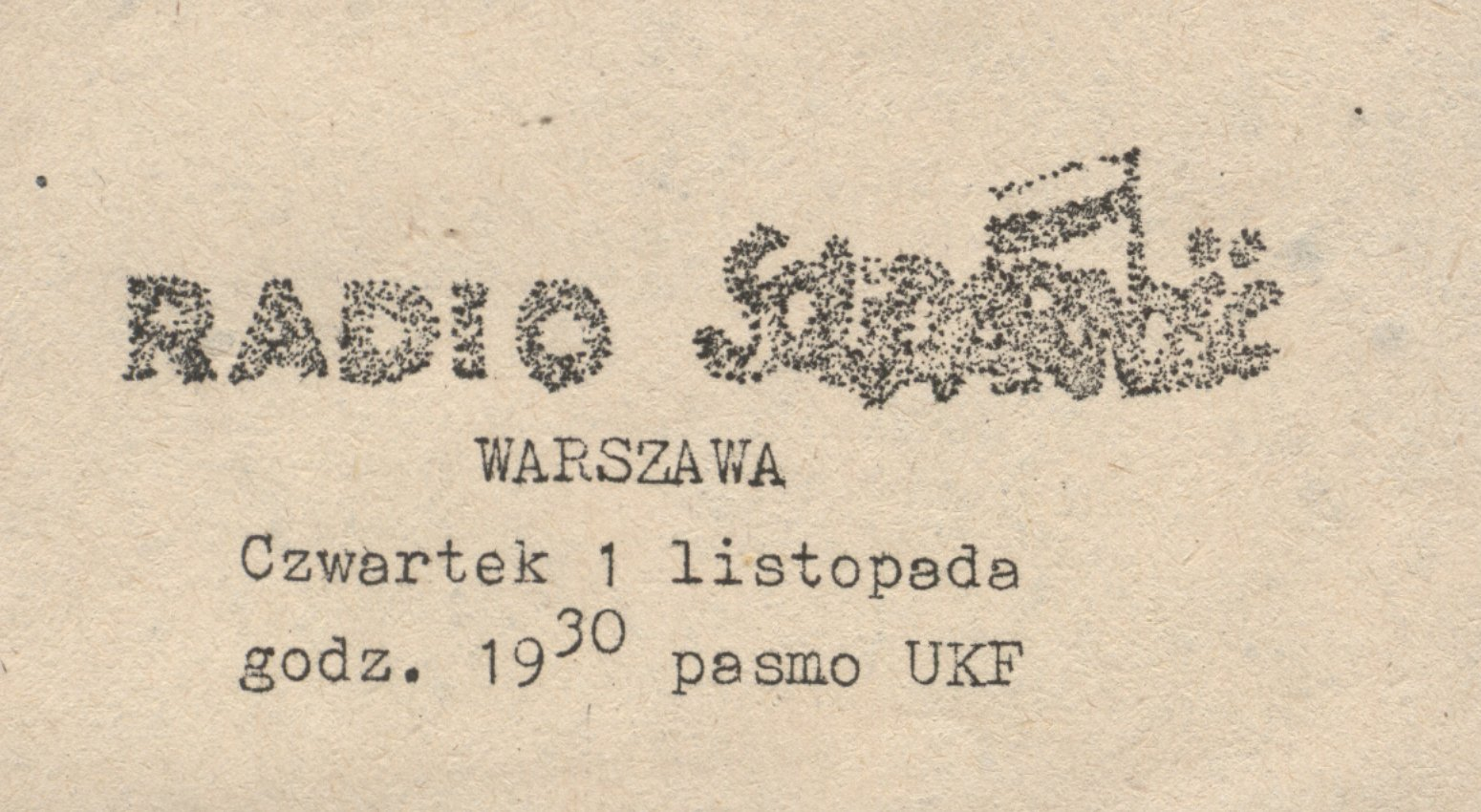
A flyer informing about date and hour of a Radio Solidarity broadcast

Radio Solidarity (Polish: Radio Solidarność) or Radio S was an underground radio station of the Solidarity resistance movement, broadcasting on 70.1 MHz FM in Poland, in defiance of censorship, from the 1982 martial law in Poland to the fall of the communist regime of the Polish People's Republic. It was established by Zbigniew Romaszewski and his wife, Zofia Romaszewska.

Broadcasts were often short, as they were transmitted from temporary locations around Warsaw to avoid detection from the security services.
