= Antoni Stychel =

Polish priest and politician

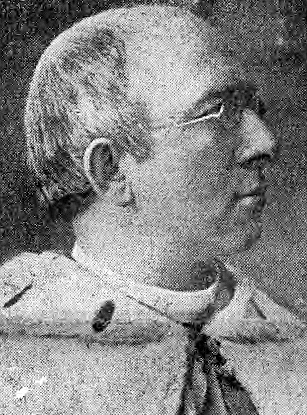
Antoni Stychel

Antoni Stychel (1859–1935) was a Polish priest, member of parliament, president of the Union of the Catholic Societies of Polish Workers (Związek Katolickich Towarzystw Robotników Polskich). He was one of the pioneers of the Catholic social movement in Poland.
