= Łukawiec, Rzeszów County =

Łukawiec
- Village
- Location within Poland
- Coordinates: 50°7′0″N 22°6′0″E
- Country: Poland
- Voivodeship: Subcarpathian
- County: Rzeszów
- Gmina: Trzebownisko
- Population: 2,500

Łukawiec [wuˈkavʲɛt͡s] is a village in the administrative district of Gmina Trzebownisko, within Rzeszów County, Subcarpathian Voivodeship, in south-eastern Poland.
