= Andrzej Stelmachowski =

Polish politician (1925–2009)

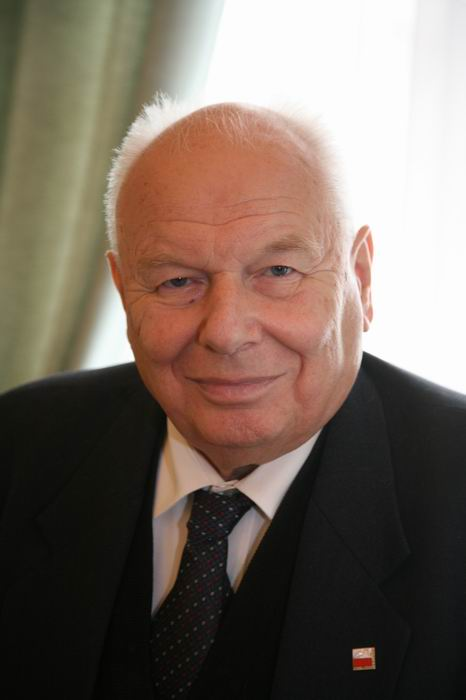

Marshal of the Senate
- In office 4 July 1989 – 26 November 1991
- Preceded by: Office established
- Succeeded by: August Chełkowski

Minister of National Education
- In office 23 December 1991 – 5 June 1992
- President: Lech Wałęsa
- Prime Minister: Jan Olszewski
- Preceded by: Robert Głębocki
- Succeeded by: Zdobysław Flisowski

Personal details
- Born: 28 January 1925 Poznań, Poland
- Died: 6 April 2009 (aged 84) Warsaw, Poland
- Profession: Academician

Andrzej Stanisław Ksawery Stelmachowski (Polish pronunciation: [ˈand.ʐɛj stɛlmaˈxɔfskʲi], 28 January 1925, Poznań – 6 April 2009, Warsaw) was a Polish academic and politician.

== Life ==
Stelmachowski was a member of Armia Krajowa, the Polish resistance during Second World War. A lawyer, professor of University of Wrocław (from 1962) and University of Warsaw (from 1967), he was a Solidarity advisor in 1980 and took part in the Polish Round Table Agreement. He also served as Marshal of the Senate (1989–1991), Minister of Education (1991–1992), and presidential advisor from (2007–2009). In his advisory capacity he suggested doing away with the secrecy of the Union of Solidarity; his idea was to "break away" and "create open structures as much as possible".

Stelmachowski was the founder and then president of Stowarzyszenie "Wspólnota Polska", serving until 11 May 2008.

Stelmachowski died on 6 April 2009. The Polish President Lech Kaczynski expressed his condolences to family and friends as did politicians from across the political spectrum in Poland, representatives of Polish emigrant organizations in Belarus, Lithuania and United States.

== See also ==
- List of Poles
