= Zaczernie =

- Village
- Location within Poland
- Coordinates: 50°6′N 22°1′E
- Country: Poland
- Voivodeship: Subcarpathian
- County: Rzeszów
- Gmina: Trzebownisko
- Population: 2,965

Zaczernie [zaˈt͡ʂɛrɲɛ] is a village in the administrative district of Gmina Trzebownisko, within Rzeszów County, Subcarpathian Voivodeship, in south-eastern Poland.
