= Józefowo, Suwałki County =

Józefowo
- Village
- Location within Poland
- Coordinates: 54°0′43″N 22°52′59″E
- Country: Poland
- Voivodeship: Podlaskie
- County: Suwałki
- Gmina: Raczki

Józefowo (Polish pronunciation: [juzɛˈfɔvɔ]) is a village in the administrative district of Gmina Raczki, within Suwałki County, Podlaskie Voivodeship, in north-eastern Poland.
