= Stanisław Karczewski =

Polish surgeon and politician

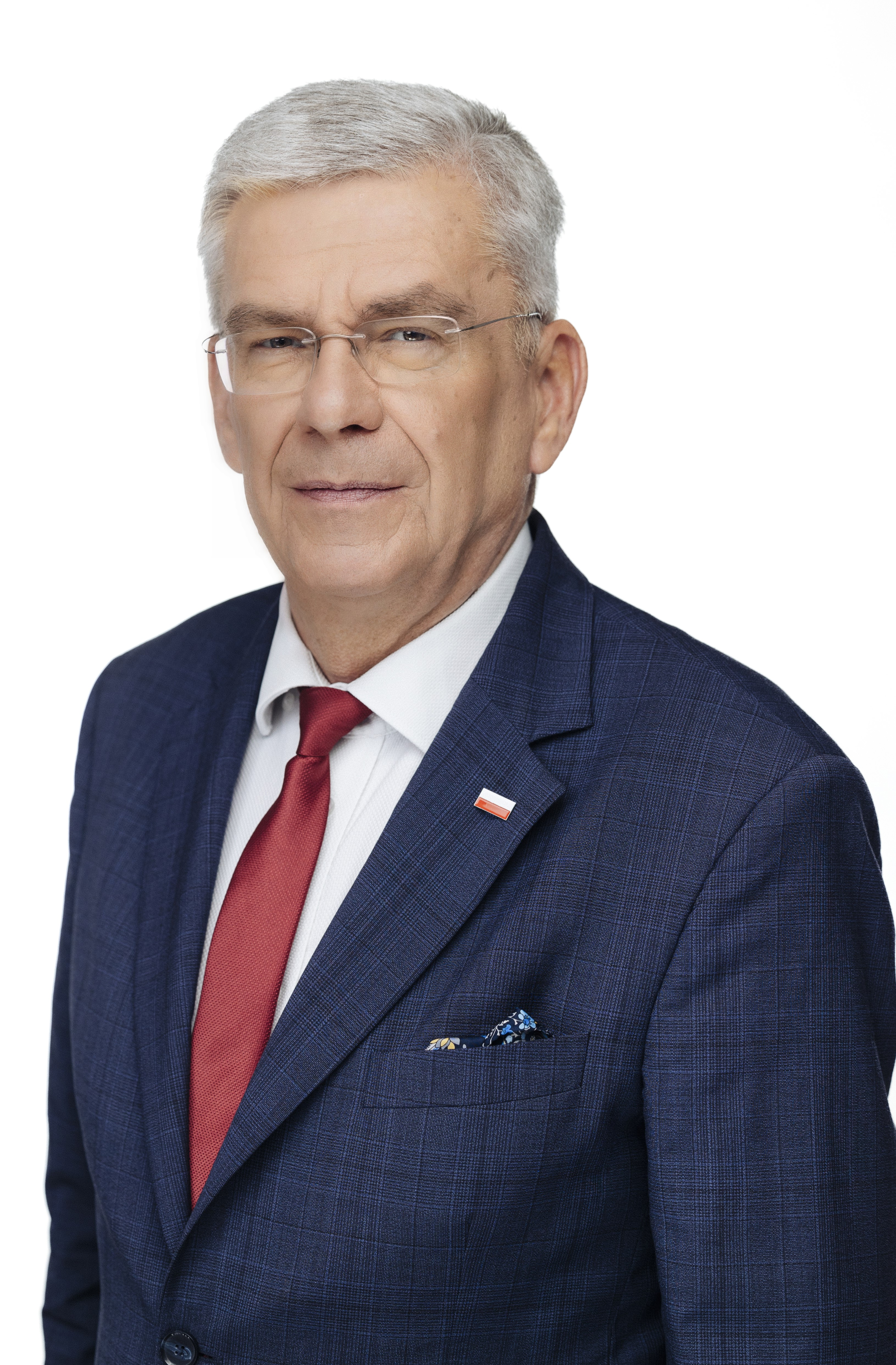

Deputy Marshal of the Senate
- In office 12 November 2019 – 13 May 2020 Serving with See List
- Marshal: Tomasz Grodzki
- In office 9 November 2011 – 11 November 2015 Serving with See List
- Marshal: Bogdan Borusewicz

Marshal of the Senate
- In office 12 November 2015 – 12 November 2019
- Preceded by: Bogdan Borusewicz
- Succeeded by: Tomasz Grodzki

Personal details
- Born: 14 November 1955 (age 70) Warsaw, Poland
- Party: Law and Justice
- Spouse: Eliza Karczewska
- Children: 2 (daughters)
- Education: University of Warsaw
- Website: stanislawkarczewski.pl

Stanisław Karczewski (born 14 November 1955) is a Polish politician and surgeon. He has served as a Senator since 2005, as Deputy Speaker of the Senate between 2011 and 2015 and since 2019, and between 2015 and 2019 as Marshal of the Senate of Poland.

== Biography ==
He graduated in 1981 with a medical degree from the Medical University of Warsaw, after which he received a second specialized degree in general surgery. He was employed from 1981 at the district hospital in the town of New City Pilica. He served both as assistant director of the emergency department, and as director of the hospital. He is currently head of the Department of Surgery.

Between 1998 and 2002 he worked in the Grójec County local administration, and from 2002 to 2005 he served as a councilor of the regional council of Mazovia. In the 2005 parliamentary elections he was elected senator from the Law and Justice party list in the district of Radom. In 2011 he successfully ran for re-election in a new district. He served as Deputy Marshal of the Senate from 9 November 2011. In 2015 he was re-elected Senator. On 12 November 2015 he was selected to serve as the Marshal of the Senate. He served as the Marshal by a whole term of office, until 12 November 2019, when he was succeeded by Tomasz Grodzki. The same day he was again appointed Deputy Marshal. He stepped down as Deputy Marshall and was replaced by Marek Pęk on 13 May 2020.

== Personal life ==
Karczewski is a member of the Association of Polish Surgeons and the Society of Surgeons. He is married with two children.
