= Ryszard Jarzembowski =

Polish politician (1945–2021)

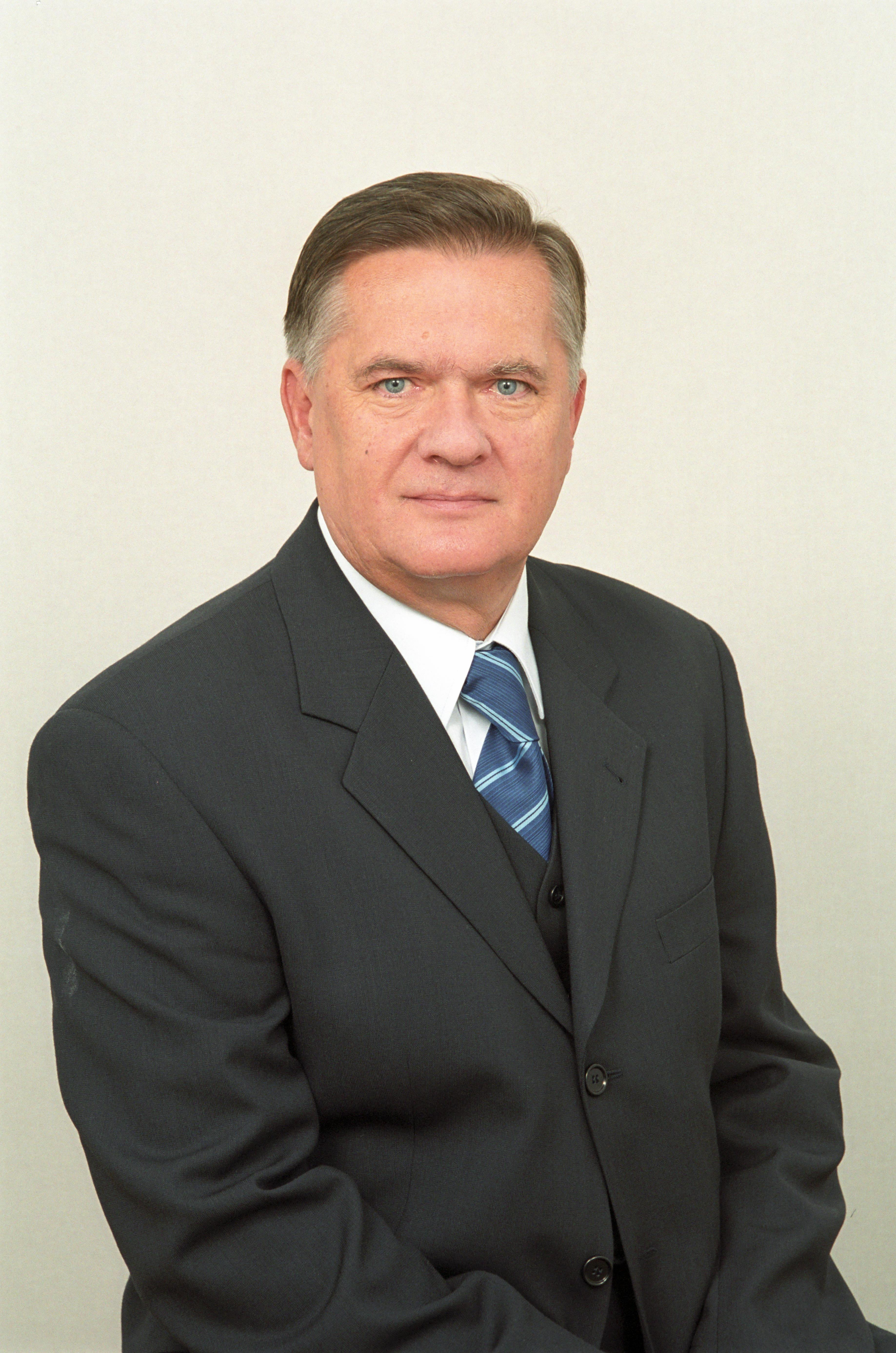
Ryszard Jarzembowski (2001).

Ryszard Jarzembowski (24 December 1945, in Poland – 9 August 2021) was a Polish politician who served as a Senator.

Jarzembowski died on 9 August 2021 in Włocławek, Poland, at the age of 75.
