= Marshal of the Sejm =

Speaker of the lower house of the Polish parliament

Marshal of the Sejm of the Republic of Poland
- Marszałek Sejmu Rzeczypospolitej Polskiej
- Logo of the Sejm

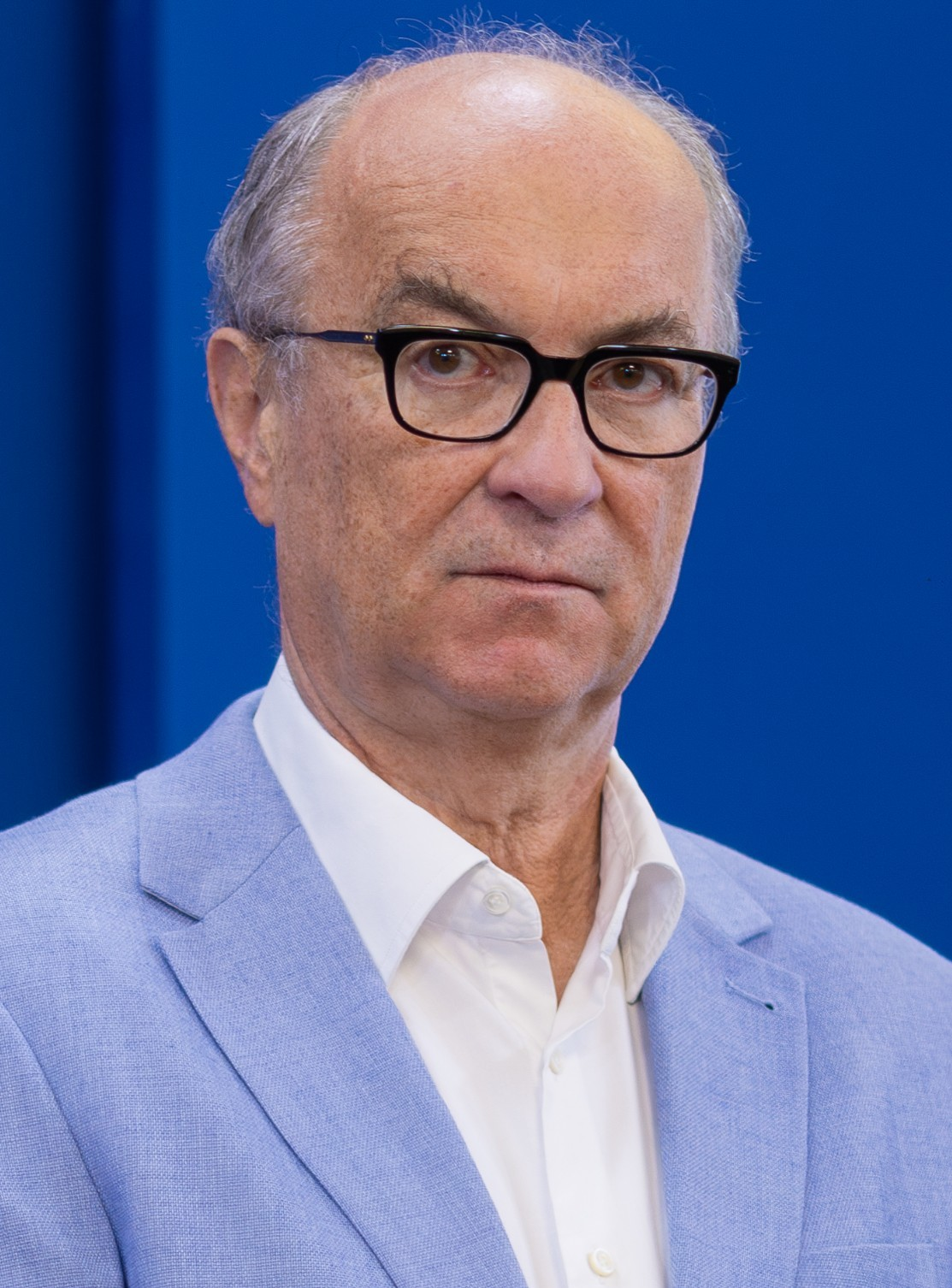
- Incumbent; Włodzimierz Czarzasty since 18 November 2025
- Presidum of the Sejm
- Style: His/Her Excellency/Mr./Ms Marshal
- Appointer: The Sejm
- Inaugural holder: Jan Sierakowski
- Formation: 31 October 1548
- Succession: First
- Deputy: Vice-Marshals
- Website: Marshal of the Sejm

The marshal of the Sejm (Polish: Marszałek Sejmu, pronounced [marˈʂawɛk ˈsɛjmu]) is the speaker of the Sejm, the lower house of the Polish Parliament. The office traces its origins to the 15th century. In modern Poland, the full title is Marshal of the Sejm of the Republic of Poland (Marszałek Sejmu Rzeczypospolitej Polskiej). Marszałek, in this case, is Polish native name for parliamentary Speaker.

== Related historical offices ==
The Polish–Lithuanian Commonwealth also had an office of Sejmik Marshal.

In the Kingdom of Galicia and Lodomeria, from 1861, the chairman of the Provincial Sejm of Galicia with its seat at Lwów bore the title Marszałek krajowy (Province Marshal). The Kingdom of Poland, from 1916 to 1918, used the title Marszałek Rady Stanu (Marshal of the State Council).

In the Second Polish Republic (1918–1939), the deputies elected one of their number as Marshal of the Sejm for the duration of the Sejm's term. Until 1935 (when superseded by the Senate Marshal), the Marshal or Chairman of the Sejm substituted for the President of Poland in the latter's absence or disability (Acting President of the Republic of Poland). Nowadays, it is again the Marshal of the Sejm who becomes the Acting President.

== Modern Marshals of the Sejm ==
Today the Marshal of the Sejm is the chairman of the Presidium of the Sejm (Prezydium Sejmu) and the Convention of Seniors (Konwent Seniorów). The Marshal oversees the work of the Sejm, supervises procedural sessions of the Sejm, and convenes and chairs the proceedings of the Convention of Seniors and the Presidium of the Sejm. The Marshal appoints the Chief of the Chambers (of the Sejm, and of the Senat), and, since 1989, substitutes for the President of Poland in the event of that office's vacancy.

Their deputy is the Deputy Marshal of the Sejm of the Republic of Poland. This would be an elected representative rather than a fixed individual.

== 2025 vote of Włodzimierz Czarzasty to the position of Marshal of the Sejm ==
Vote of Włodzimierz Czarzasty to the position of Marshal of the Sejm.
Ballot →	18 November 2025
Required majority →	224 out of 447
Votes in favour: • KO (153); • KP (31); • PL2050 (28); • Lewica (21); • Independents (3)	236 / 447
Votes against: • PiS (182); • KWiN (14); • Razem (4); • Free Republicans (3); • KKP (3); • Independents (2); • PL2050 (1)	209 / 447
Absent: • PiS (6); • KO (2); • KWiN (2); • Free Republicans (1); • PL2050 (1); • KP (1)	13 / 460

== See also ==
- Senior Marshal
- Offices in the Polish-Lithuanian Commonwealth
