= Jolanta Danielak =

Polish political figure

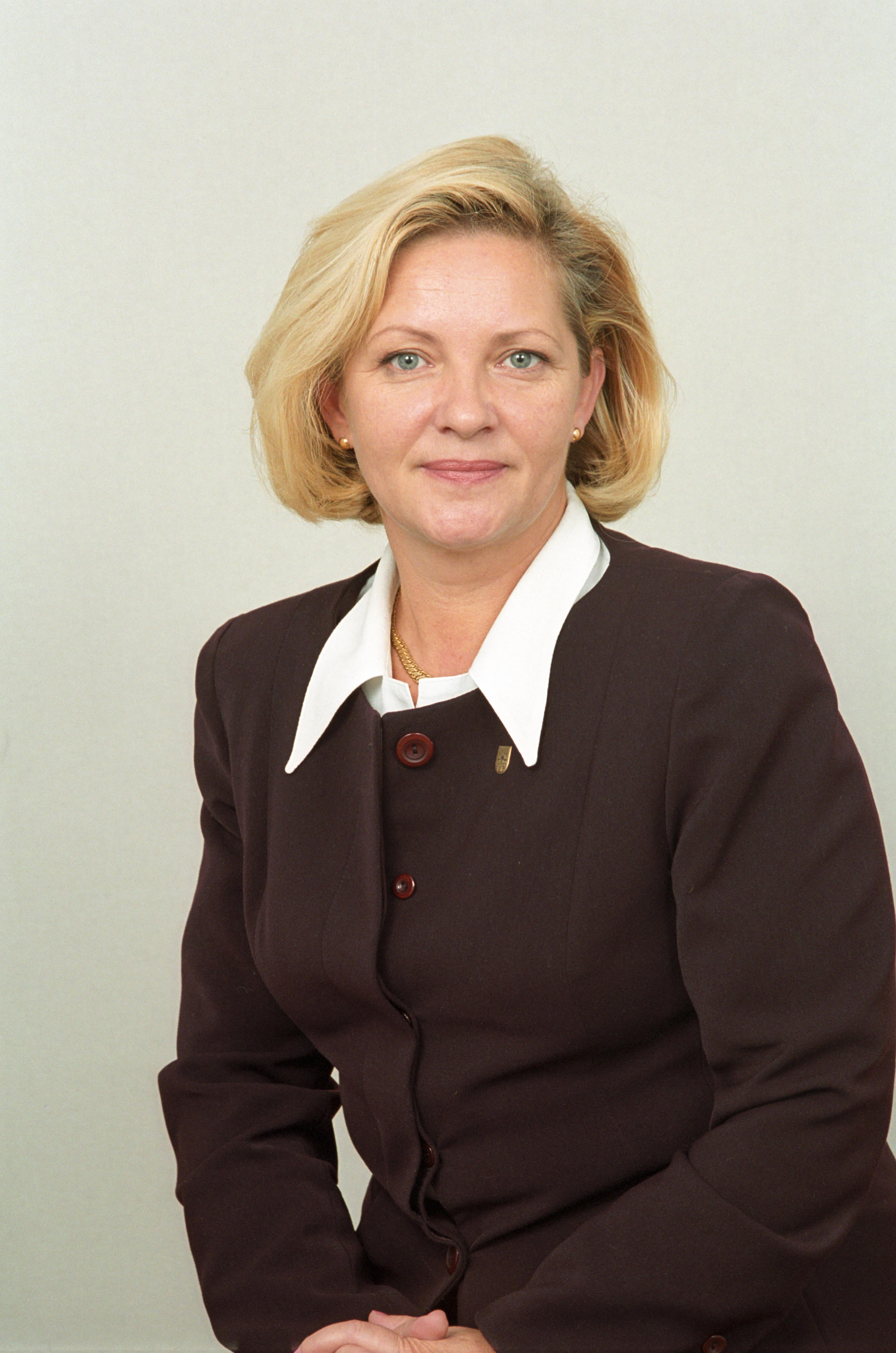
Jolanta Danielak

Jolanta Ryszarda Danielak (born 3 June 1955) is a Polish political figure who served in the national Senate from 1997 to 2005 and rose to the post of Senate Vice-Marshal, which she filled from 2001 to 2005.

A native of the northwestern town of Szczecinek, the seat of Szczecinek County in West Pomeranian Voivodeship, Jolanta Ryszarda Szwajkowska graduated from Adam Mickiewicz University in Poznań with a degree in psychology and, after earning a degree from Akademia Spraw Wewnętrznych [Academy of Internal Affairs] in Warsaw, spent a number of years working as a court, police and hospital psychologist.

A member of the Democratic Left Alliance and, previously Social Democracy of the Republic of Poland (SdRP), she was elected, in 1994, to the Zielona Góra City Council, where she rose to the position of chairwoman in 1997, serving until 2001. Concurrently, from 1997 to 2005, she served in the Senate and in 2001, immediately upon ending her term as Chairwoman of the Zielona Góra City Council, was elected by the Senate to serve as a Vice-Marshal, a position she held until losing her Senate seat, along with all other members of the Democratic Left Alliance in the 2005 Polish parliamentary election.

In 2006, running on the Left and Democrats ticket, she regained her old seat on the City Council, but did not succeed in winning a Sejm seat in the 2007 Polish parliamentary election.
