= Marshal of the Senate of Poland =

Presiding officer of the Senate of Poland

Marshal of the Senate of the Republic of Poland
- Marszałek Senatu Rzeczypospolitej Polskiej

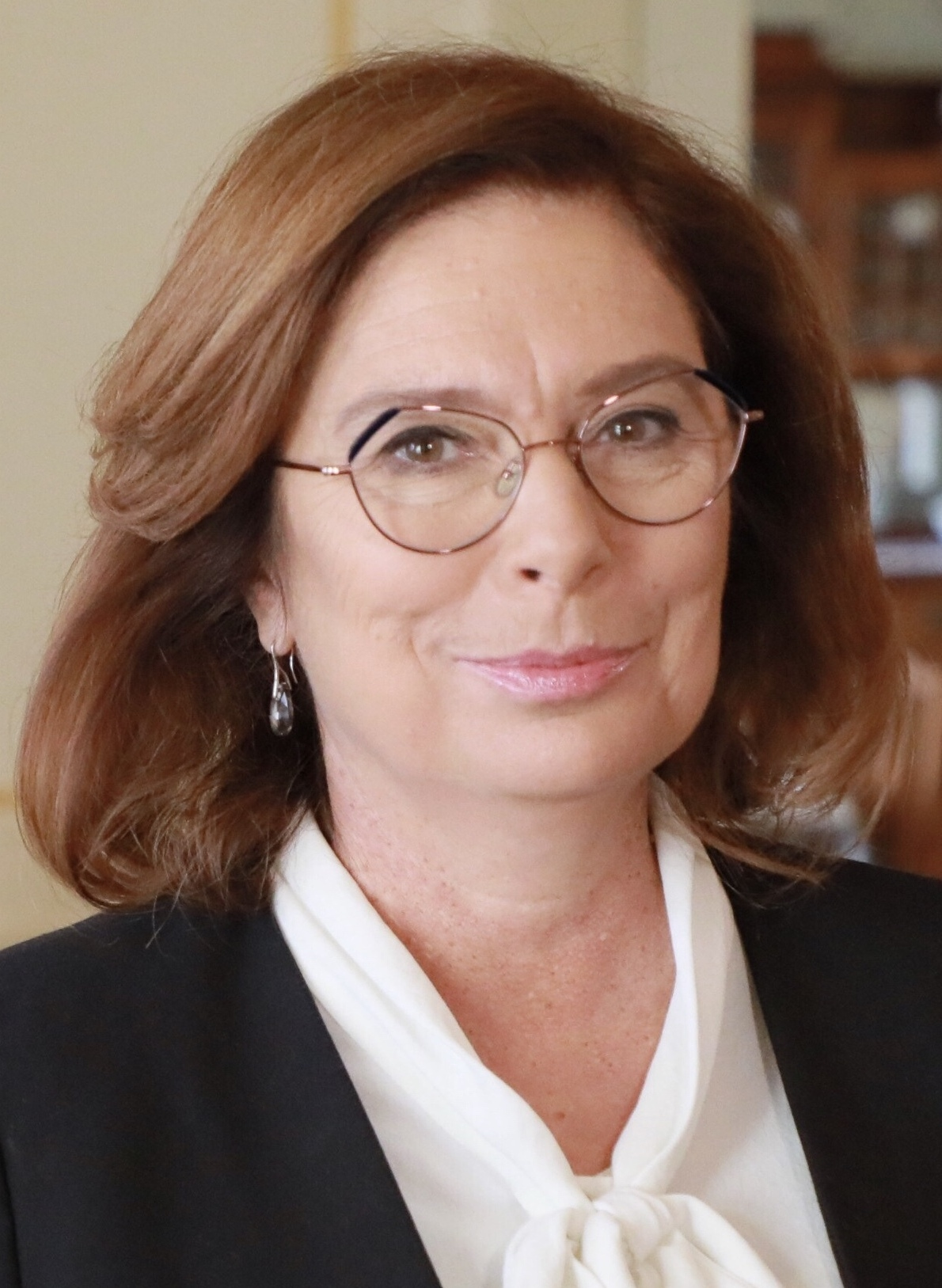
- Incumbent; Małgorzata Kidawa-Błońska since 13 November 2023
- Appointer: The Senate
- Formation: 1922
- First holder: Wojciech Trąmpczyński

The Marshal of the Senate of the Republic of Poland (Polish: Marszałek Senatu Rzeczypospolitej Polskiej) is the presiding officer of the Senate, the upper chamber of the Polish parliament. The marshal is third in the Polish order of precedence, behind the President of Poland and the Marshal of the Sejm, the lower chamber of parliament. They are concurrently second in line to become acting President of Poland (which occurs in the event that the president becomes incapacitated due to natural or legal causes), behind the Marshal of the Sejm (between 1935 and 1939, Marshal of the Senate was first in line). Because of both the order of precedence and the order of succession, the Marshal of the Senate is commonly referred to as the "third person in the state". The person who functions as their second-in-command is the Deputy Marshal of the Senate of the Republic of Poland.

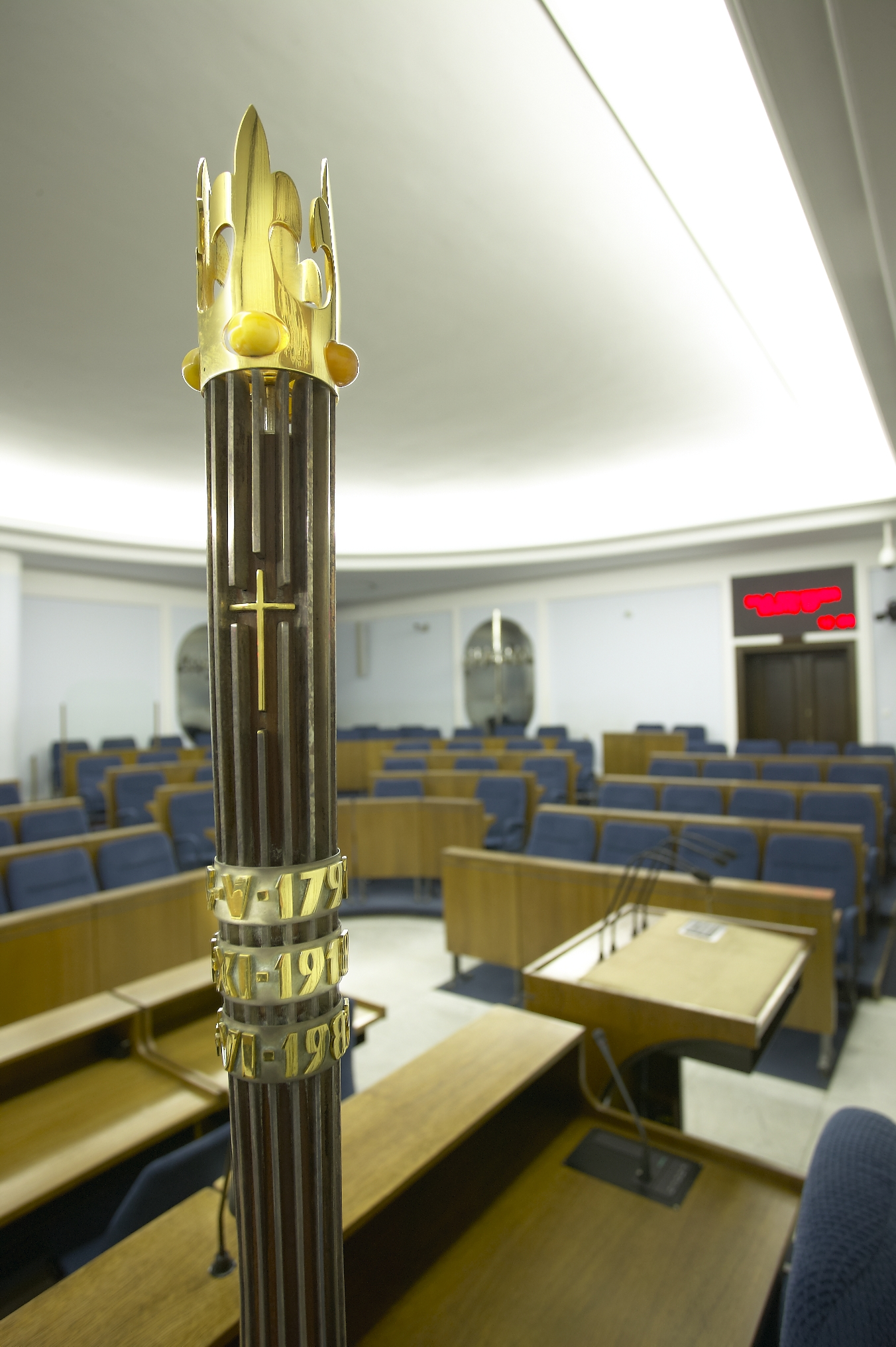
Pommel of the Marshal's staff

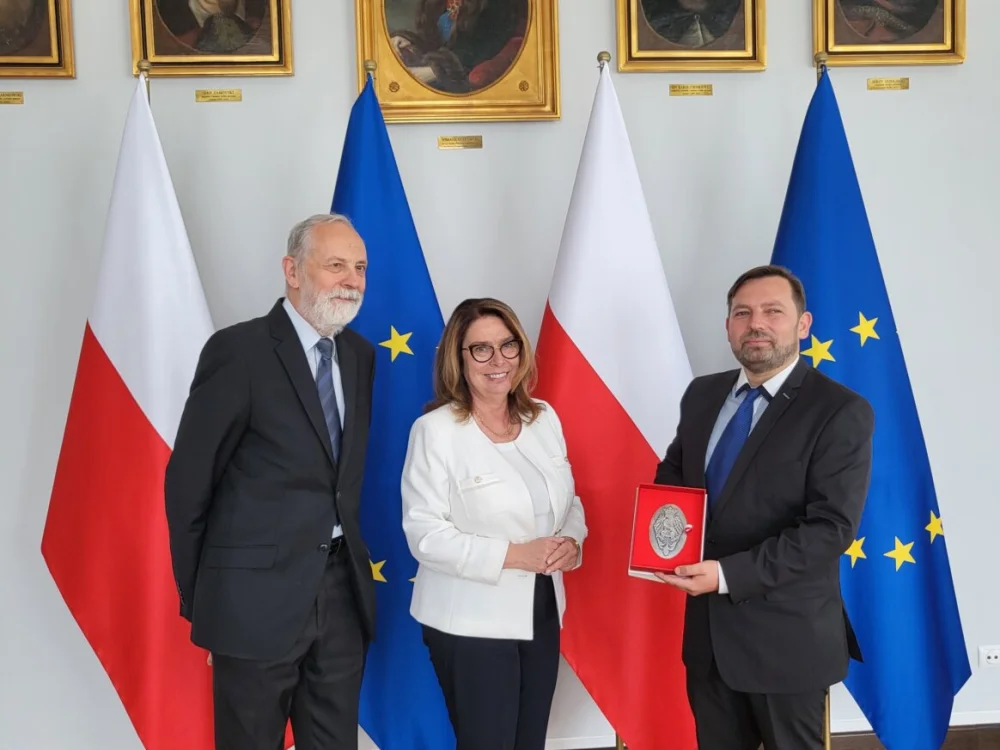
Małgorzata Kidawa-Błońska, Marshal of the Senate of the Republic of Poland, presents the Medal of the Senate of the Republic of Poland to Dawid Jung, 2024

== Role ==
Marshal:

- Represent Senate
- Preside over Senate sessions
- Preside over Senate Presidium and caucus of heads of Senatorial caucuses (Konwent Seniorów) meetings
- Performing some representative roles on the state level
- Becoming Acting President when Sejm Marshal cannot do so
- Is in charge on peacekeeping in the Senate

== History ==
Marshals of the Senate existed as early as the Duchy of Warsaw (19th century). In the Polish–Lithuanian Commonwealth, the role was performed by the Grand Crown Marshals.

== List of officeholders ==
=== Second Polish Republic (1922–1939) ===
No.	Name (Birth–Death)	Portrait	Political affiliation	Term of office			Senate
No.	Name (Birth–Death)	Portrait	Political affiliation	Start	End	Duration	Senate
1	Wojciech Trąmpczyński (1860–1953)		Independent	1 December 1922	28 November 1927	4 years, 363 days	1st
2	Julian Szymański (1870–1958)		BBWR	27 March 1928	30 August 1930	2 years, 157 days	2nd
3	Władysław Raczkiewicz (1885–1947)		BBWR	9 December 1930	10 July 1935	4 years, 214 days	3rd
4	Aleksander Prystor (1874–1941)		BBWR (Note: Until 30 October 1935, when the Bloc was dissolved.)	4 October 1935	13 September 1938	2 years, 345 days	4th
4	Aleksander Prystor (1874–1941)		Camp of National Unity	4 October 1935	13 September 1938	2 years, 345 days	4th
5	Bogusław Miedziński (1891–1972)		Camp of National Unity	28 November 1938	2 November 1939	340 days	5th

=== Republic of Poland (since 1989) ===
No.	Name (Birth–Death)	Portrait	Parliamentary group (party) (Note: When the officeholder's parliamentary group and political party are not one and the same, the party membership is specified in parentheses.)	Constituency	Term of office			Senate
No.	Name (Birth–Death)	Portrait	Parliamentary group (party)	Constituency	Start	End	Duration	Senate
1	Andrzej Stelmachowski (1925–2009)		Citizens' Parliamentary Club	Białystok	4 July 1989	25 November 1991	2 years, 21 days	1st
2	August Chełkowski (1927–1999)		Independent	Katowice	26 November 1991	31 May 1993	1 year, 187 days	2nd
3	Adam Struzik (born 1957)		Polish People's Party	Płock	15 October 1993	20 October 1997	4 years, 5 days	3rd
4	Alicja Grześkowiak (born 1941)		Solidarity Electoral Action	Toruń	21 October 1997	18 October 2001	3 years, 363 days	4th
5	Longin Pastusiak (1935–2025)		Democratic Left Alliance	24 (Gdańsk)	20 October 2001	18 October 2005	3 years, 364 days	5th
6	Bogdan Borusewicz (born 1949)		Independent	24 (Gdańsk)	20 October 2005	4 November 2007	2 years, 16 days	6th
6	Bogdan Borusewicz (born 1949)		Independent	24 (Gdańsk)	5 November 2007	7 November 2011	4 years, 3 days	7th
6	Bogdan Borusewicz (born 1949)		Civic Platform (Note: Joined the Civic Platform parliamentary group and party on 11 June 2011.)	24 (Gdańsk)	5 November 2007	7 November 2011	4 years, 3 days	7th
6	Bogdan Borusewicz (born 1949)		Civic Platform	65 (Gdańsk-Sopot)	8 November 2011	11 November 2015	4 years, 4 days	8th
7	Stanisław Karczewski (born 1955)		Law and Justice	49 (Radom II)	12 November 2015	11 November 2019	4 years, 0 days	9th
8	Tomasz Grodzki (born 1958)		Civic Platform	97 (Szczecin)	12 November 2019	12 November 2023	4 years, 1 day	10th
9	Małgorzata Kidawa-Błońska (born 1957)		Civic Coalition	43 (South Warsaw)	13 November 2023	Incumbent	2 years, 299 days	11th

== See also ==
- Marshal of the Sejm
