= Solidarność: Menedżer Konspiracji =

2013 video game

- Release: 2013
- Genre(s): Educational

Solidarność: Menadżer Konspiracji is a 2013 Polish educational game.
