= Tomasz Grodzki =

Polish politician, doctor and surgeon

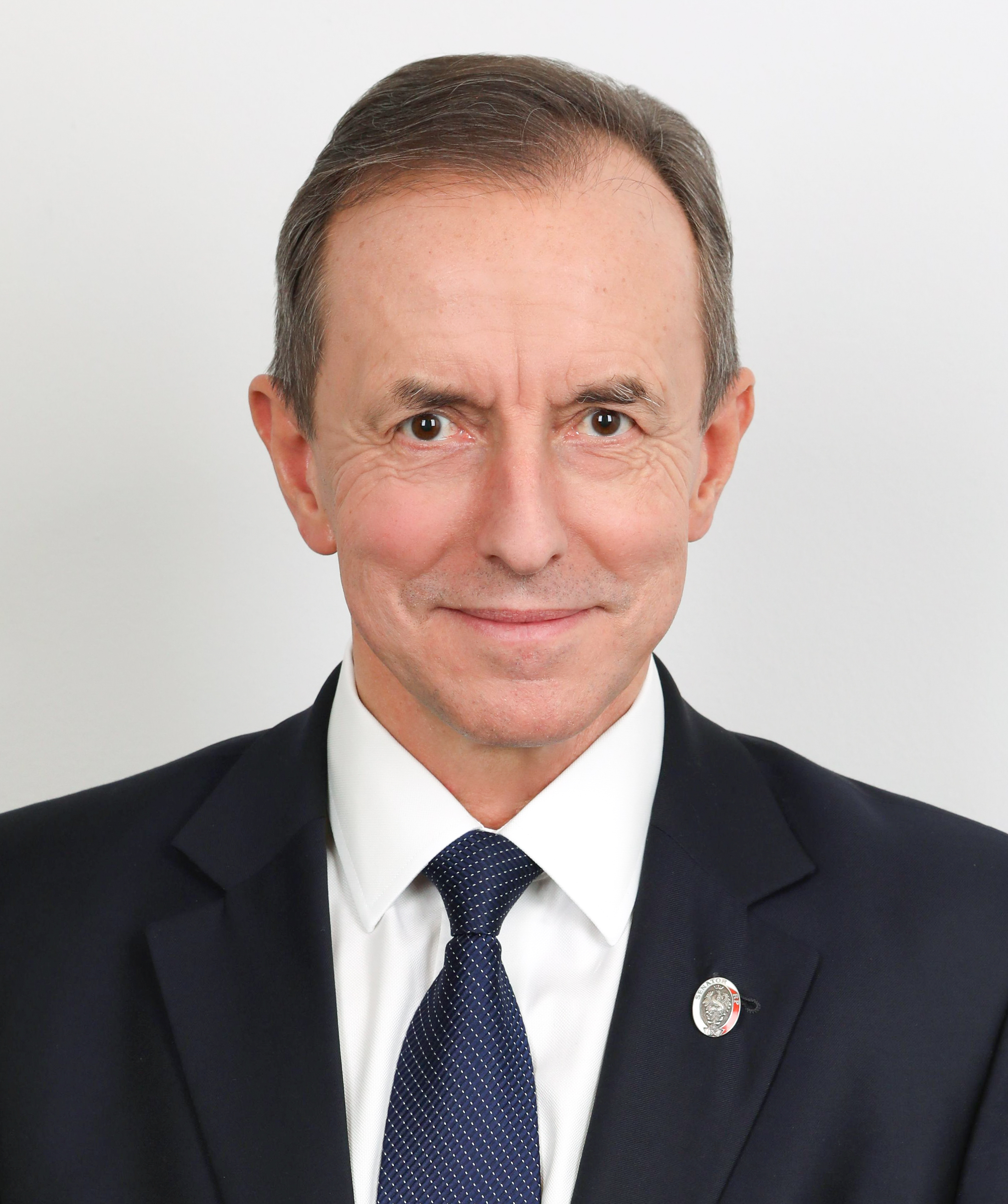
- Official portrait, 2019

Marshal of the Senate
- In office 12 November 2019 – 12 November 2023
- Preceded by: Stanisław Karczewski
- Succeeded by: Małgorzata Kidawa-Błońska

Member of Senate
- Incumbent
- Assumed office 12 November 2015
- Preceded by: Norbert Obrycki
- Constituency: 97 - Szczecin

Member of Szczecin City Council
- In office 2006–2015

Personal details
- Born: Tomasz Paweł Grodzki; 13 May 1958 (age 68) Szczecin, Polish People's Republic
- Party: Civic Platform
- Spouse: Joanna Grodzka
- Children: 2 (Daughters)
- Education: Pomeranian Medical University

Tomasz Paweł Grodzki (Polish pronunciation: [ˈtɔmaʐ ˈɡrɔt͡skʲi]; born 13 May 1958) is a Polish politician, doctor and surgeon. He has served as Marshal of the Senate from 2019 to 2023 defeating Stanisław Karczewski with a majority of 51 votes from the Senate.

== Biography ==
=== Education and scientific activity ===
Grodzki is a graduate of the Pomeranian Medical University in Szczecin (1983), at which obtained a doctoral degree in 1991, a postdoctoral degree in 2003, as well as the title of Medical Science Professor in 2010. He was associated with the Pomeranian Medical University's Medical Faculty and then the Pomeranian Medical University in his scientific work.

=== Political career ===
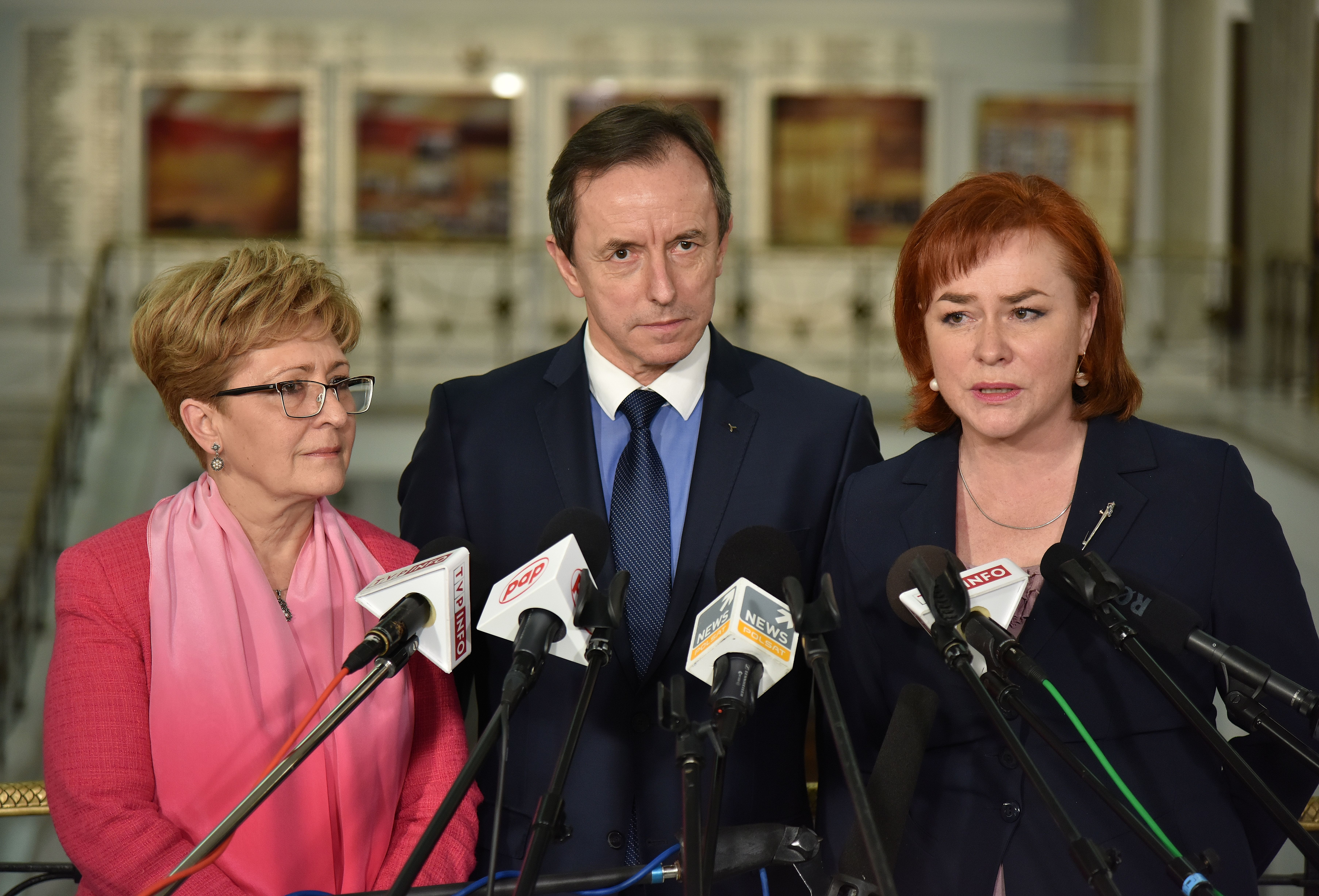
Grodzki with Elżbieta Radziszewska and Lidia Gądek in the Sejm, 2016

In the Polish local elections in 2006, 2010 and 2014, he was elected a councilor of the City Council of Szczecin from the Civic Platform's lists without formally entering the party. In 2014, his candidacy was put up for the European Parliament. Grodzki obtained 26 863 votes and did not assume a seat.

In the 2015 election, he stood as a candidate for the Senate in the 97th single-member electoral district. He obtained a senatorial seat by acquiring 69 887 votes.

In September 2019, Małgorzata Kidawa-Błońska announced him to be the Civic Coalition's candidate for the office of Minister of Health upon the committee's potential victory in the election due in the same year, in which he renewed his senatorial seat, obtaining 149 245 votes in total.

On 8 November 2019 his candidacy for Marshal of the Senate of the 10th term was put up by the Civic Coalition, the Polish People's Party, and the Left. On 12 November he was voted Marshal at the majority of 51 votes.

== Corruption allegations ==
In March 2021, representatives of the Regional Prosecutor's Office in Szczecin requested the Senate to waive the Marshal's immunity, and then intended to bring charges against him in connection with the alleged acceptance of financial benefits four times in 2006, 2009 and 2012. Accusations of corruption began to be formulated against Tomasz Grodzki as early as 2019, shortly after assuming the office of marshal; then Agnieszka Popiela posted an entry on social media in which she stated that he was to accept a bribe of $500 for the operation. The politician denied these claims and filed a private indictment against the author of the entry, who in March 2021 was found guilty of defamation by the Szczecin district court, conditionally discontinuing the proceedings and obliging him to apologize to the marshal. The judgment was quashed in September of the same year by the regional court, and the case was remitted.

Tomasz Grodzki also filed private indictments of defamation against Polish journalist Tomasz Sakiewicz, who called him "an ordinary bribe", Samuel Pereira and a journalist from Radio Szczecin and "Gazeta Polska".

On 18 May 2022 the Senate did not consent to holding Tomasz Grodzki criminally responsible for the charges raised by prosecutors.

== Private life ==
Grodzki is married to Joanna, an eye specialist, with two daughters.
