= Alicja Grześkowiak =

Polish politician (born 1941)

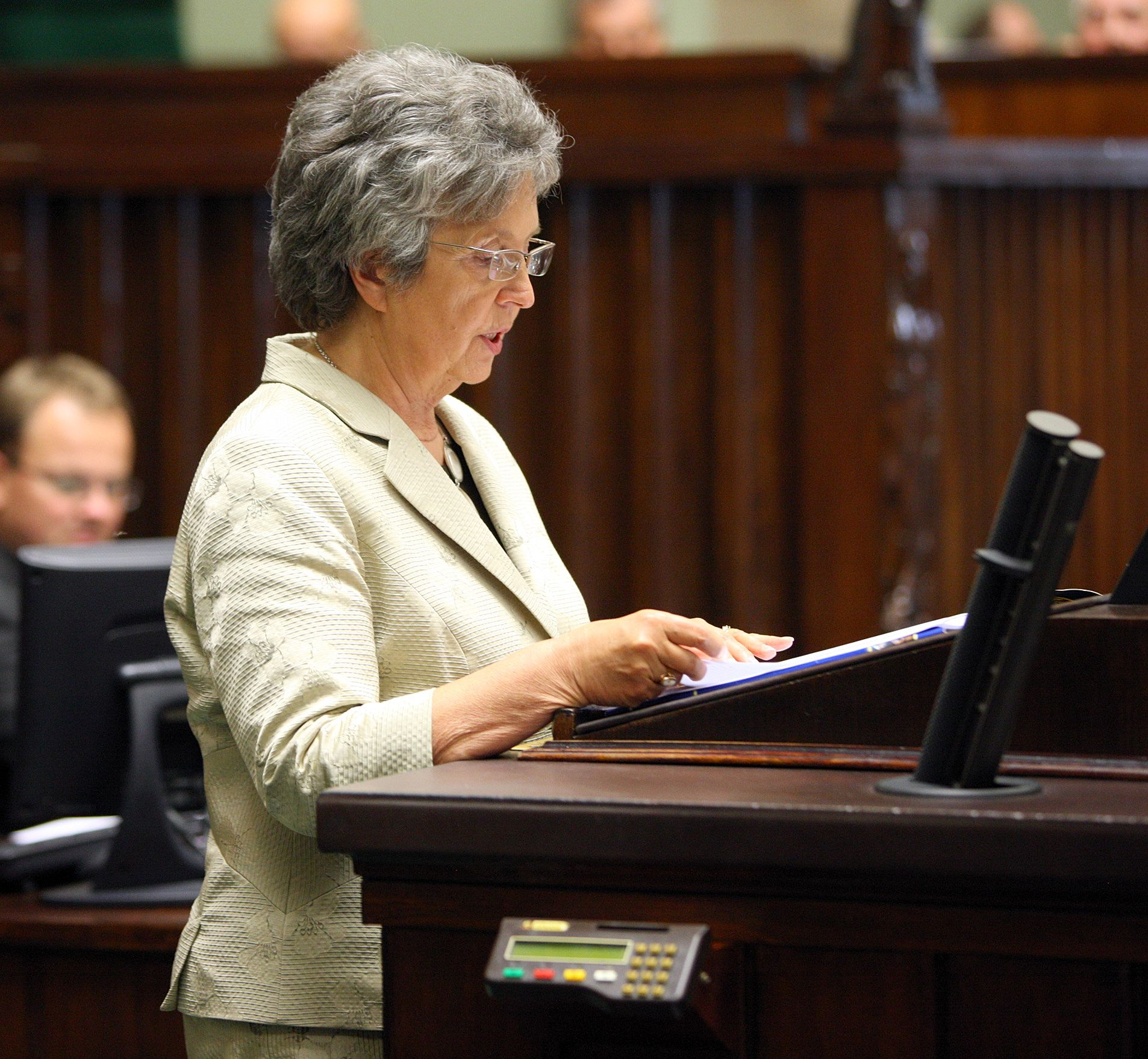

4th Marshal of the Senate of Poland
- In office 21 October 1997 – 18 October 2001

Personal details
- Born: 10 June 1941 (age 84) Świrz
- Party: Solidarity Electoral Action

Alicja Grześkowiak (born 10 June 1941) is a Polish politician who served as Marshal of the Senate of Poland from 21 October 1997 to 18 October 2001.

== Biography and career ==
She graduated with a law degree from the Nicolaus Copernicus University in Toruń in 1971, and followed that up with an internship at the University of Rome. In 1990, she became a professor at the John Paul II Catholic University of Lublin. The following year she returned to Nicolaus Copernicus University as a professor, and also stayed on at the Catholic University, teaching in their law department until 2010.

Grześkowiak joined Solidarity in 1980 and focused on representing students and workers who were repressed under the communist regime; she received the Cross of Freedom and Solidarity in 2017 for her efforts. She was elected to the Senate of Poland as a member of the Solidarity Citizens' Committee in 1989. She served as a delegate for Poland to the Council of Europe, and served as Vice President of the Group of Christian Democrats in the council. She was re-elected to the Senate in 1991 and 1993. During her first three terms she served on the Constitutional Committee and the Committee on Human Rights and the Rule of Law, and was Deputy Marshal of the Senate in her second term.

In 1997, Grześkowiak was re-elected to a fourth term in the Senate, and was named Marshal of the Senate. After her term ended in 2001, she chose not to run for office again, focusing on her advisory and academic roles. She also served as advisor for the Pontifical Academy for Life and the Pontifical Council for the Family.
