= List of Polish senators (2011–2015) =

8th term of the Senate of Poland

8th Senate
←	7th Senate	9th Senate	→

Overview
- Legislative body: Senate of Poland
- Term: 8 November 2011 – 11 November 2015
- Election: 2011
- Government: Tusk II; Kopacz
- Website: www.senat.gov.pl
- Members: 100 senators
- Senior Marshal: Kazimierz Kutz
- Senate Marshal: Bogdan Borusewicz
- Deputy Senate Marshals: Stanisław Karczewski; Maria Pańczyk-Pozdziej; Jan Wyrowiński

The 8th Senate of Poland was elected on 9 October 2011 at the 2011 parliamentary election and lasted between 8 November 2011 and 11 November 2015. Senate Marshal was Bogdan Borusewicz (PO) for the third time in a row.

== Presidium ==
Office	Holder	Terms of office	
Senior Marshal	Kazimierz Kutz	8 November 2011	
Marshal	Bogdan Borusewicz	8 November 2011	11 November 2015
Deputy Marshals	Stanisław Karczewski	8 November 2011	11 November 2015
Deputy Marshals	Maria Pańczyk-Pozdziej	8 November 2011	11 November 2015
Deputy Marshals	Jan Wyrowiński	8 November 2011	11 November 2015

== Composition ==
Numbers of senators affiliated with following parliamentary clubs or caucuses as of the first and last day of the 8th term:

Parliamentary group	Senators		
Parliamentary group	Inaugural	Final	+/–
Civic Platform	63	57	▼6
Law and Justice	30	32	▲2
Polish People's Party	2	2	Steady
United Poland (Solidarna Polska)	1	—	▼1
United Right (Zjednoczona Prawica)	—	1	▲1
Independent Senators Caucus	3	4	▲1
Non-inscrits	1	3	▲2
Total	100	99	▼1
Vacant	—	1	▲1

== List ==
Full list of 100 senators elected on 9 October 2011 at 2011 election, and 6 by-elected senators:

Key
‡	Indicates by-elected senators.
	Indicates senators, who left their seat during their term.
For details see § Departed/replaced.

Constituency	Senator	Committee	# of votes	% of votes
1	Jan Michalski	Civic Platform	33,641	35.55%
2	Józef Pinior	Civic Platform	40,703	41.01%
3	Dorota Czudowska	Law and Justice	45167	29.5%
4	Wiesław Kilian	Civic Platform	35,461	30.63%
5	Stanisław Jurcewicz	Civic Platform	49,054	42.69%
6	Jarosław Duda	Civic Platform	73121	35.35%
7	Alicja Paulina Chybicka	Civic Platform	62,452	43.89%
8	Jarosław Obremski	KWW Rafał Dutkiewicz	63,717	41.89%
9	Andrzej Kobiak	Civic Platform	77,485	32.25%
10	Jan Rulewski	Civic Platform	61,026	45.28%
11	Jan Wyrowiński	Civic Platform	47,641	35.64%
12	Michał Wojtczak	Civic Platform	40,492	38.4%
13	Andrzej Person	Civic Platform	49,720	42.59%
14	Stanisław Gogacz	Law and Justice	56,709	36.57%
15	Grzegorz Czelej	Law and Justice	65,504	43.85%
16	Henryk Cioch	Law and Justice	52,961	34.18%
17	Grzegorz Bierecki	Law and Justice	31,716	32.4%
18	Józef Zając	Polish People's Party	26,415	31.3%
19	Jerzy Chróścikowski	Law and Justice	54,261	37.53%
20	Stanisław Iwan	Civic Platform	53,489	45.65%
21	Helena Hatka	Civic Platform	44,484	34.33%
22	Robert Dowhan	Civic Platform	43,822	46.34%
23	Maciej Grubski	Civic Platform	76,862	41.5%
24	Ryszard Bronisławski	Civic Platform	78,707	45.54%
25	Przemysław Błaszczyk	Law and Justice	27,392	29.4%
26	Andrzej Owczarek	Civic Platform	55,097	42.78%
27	Michał Seweryński	Law and Justice	33,770	27.23%
28	Wiesław Dobkowski	Law and Justice	51,797	36.16%
29	Grzegorz Wojciechowski	Law and Justice	47,926	38.85%
30	Andrzej Pająk	Law and Justice	92,779	38.01%
31	Bogdan Pęk	Law and Justice	49,885	31.64%
32	Janusz Sepioł	Civic Platform	77,790	46.69%
33	Bogdan Klich	Civic Platform	95,439	52.53%
34	Maciej Klima	Law and Justice	51,013	39.52%
35	Kazimierz Wiatr	Law and Justice	52,814	38.69%
36	Stanisław Hodorowicz	Civic Platform	45,938	35.28%
37	Stanisław Kogut	Law and Justice	102,185	66.31%
38	Marek Martynowski	Law and Justice	50,904	29.17%
39	Jan Maria Jackowski	Law and Justice	33,421	30.96%
40	Anna Aksamit	Civic Platform	95,003	44.41%
41	Łukasz Abgarowicz	Civic Platform	105,825	44.81%
42	Marek Borowski	KWW Marek Borowski	104,238	50.26%
43	Marek Rocki	Civic Platform	122,648	49.12%
44	Barbara Borys-Damięcka	Civic Platform	196,735	60.71%
45	Aleksander Pociej	Civic Platform	99,358	45.19%
46	Robert Mamątow	Law and Justice	42,603	32.21%
47	Henryk Górski	Law and Justice	46,999	38.83%
47	Maria Koc^{‡}	Law and Justice	9,832	58.35%
48	Waldemar Kraska	Law and Justice	41,260	43.64%
49	Stanisław Karczewski	Law and Justice	37,384	43.71%
50	Wojciech Skurkiewicz	Law and Justice	63,232	35.65%
51	Ryszard Knosala	Civic Platform	44,124	34.28%
52	Piotr Wach	Civic Platform	35,934	38.94%
53	Aleksander Świeykowski	Civic Platform	29,098	30.93%
54	Janina Sagatowska	Law and Justice	50,185	40.99%
55	Władysław Ortyl	Law and Justice	82,425	49.17%
55	Zdzisław Pupa^{‡}	Law and Justice	35,640	60.84%
56	Kazimierz Jaworski	Law and Justice	69,484	40.09%
57	Alicja Zając	Law and Justice	63,552	53.71%
58	Andrzej Matusiewicz	Law and Justice	72,861	39.45%
59	Bohdan Paszkowski	Law and Justice	51,758	33.73%
60	Tadeusz Arłukowicz	Civic Platform	84,049	41.73%
61	Włodzimierz Cimoszewicz	KWW Cimoszewicz for the Senate	39,095	49.83%
62	Kazimierz Kleina	Civic Platform	89,389	54.00%
63	Roman Zaborowski	Civic Platform	71,275	49.01%
64	Edmund Wittbrodt	Civic Platform	70,345	46.73%
65	Bogdan Borusewicz	Civic Platform	147,909	62.49%
66	Andrzej Grzyb	Civic Platform	53,771	46.60%
67	Leszek Czarnobaj	Civic Platform	34,230	49.03%
68	Jarosław Lasecki	Civic Platform	50,287	39.59%
69	Andrzej Szewiński	Civic Platform	37,471	37.12%
70	Maria Pańczyk-Pozdziej	Civic Platform	81,206	48.44%
71	Andrzej Misiołek	Civic Platform	49,705	42.50%
72	Adam Zdziebło	Civic Platform	50,903	33.92%
73	Antoni Motyczka	Civic Platform	40,929	34.11%
73	Bolesław Piecha^{‡}	Law and Justice	7,769	28.48%
73	Izabela Kloc^{‡}	Law and Justice	11,146	48.56%
74	Leszek Piechota	Civic Platform	63,789	39.35%
75	Elżbieta Bieńkowska	Civic Platform	48,281	45.24%
75	Czesław Ryszka^{‡}	Law and Justice	8,541	56.57%
76	Zbigniew Meres	Civic Platform	47,820	30.64%
77	Bogusław Śmigielski	Civic Platform	55,043	43.46%
78	Rafał Muchacki	Civic Platform	86,086	45.93%
79	Tadeusz Kopeć	Civic Platform	48,948	37.71%
80	Kazimierz Kutz	KWW Kazimierz Kutz	81,662	60.51%
81	Mieczysław Gil	Law and Justice	45,526	31.91%
82	Beata Gosiewska	Law and Justice	52,972	37.52%
82	Jarosław Rusiecki^{‡}	Law and Justice	10,098	37.07%
83	Krzysztof Słoń	Law and Justice	39,802	25.08%
84	Witold Gintowt-Dziewałtowski	Civic Platform	43,129	39.94%
85	Stanisław Gorczyca	Civic Platform	33,627	35.70%
86	Ryszard Górecki	Civic Platform	84,271	58.87%
87	Marek Konopka	Civic Platform	43,717	35.79%
88	Mieczysław Augustyn	Civic Platform	60,565	42.44%
89	Jan Filip Libicki	Civic Platform	38,040	30.32%
90	Marek Ziółkowski	Civic Platform	89,368	64.61%
91	Jadwiga Rotnicka	Civic Platform	161,582	62.29%
92	Piotr Gruszczyński	Civic Platform	56,695	40.24%
93	Ireneusz Niewiarowski	Civic Platform	39,507	30.68%
94	Marian Poślednik	Civic Platform	38,077	34.13%
95	Andżelika Możdżanowska	Polish People's Party	36,566	30.02%
96	Witold Sitarz	Civic Platform	30,879	27.00%
97	Norbert Obrycki	Civic Platform	87,115	44.29%
98	Sławomir Preiss	Civic Platform	64,833	35.14%
99	Grażyna Sztark	Civic Platform	44,974	40.11%
100	Piotr Zientarski	Civic Platform	50,178	46.54%

=== Departed/replaced ===
Senator	Office termination	Reason	Succeeded by	By-election (Turnout)	Assumed seat
Antoni Motyczka	24 January 2013	Death	Bolesław Piecha	21 April 2013 (11,14%)	24 April 2013
Władysław Ortyl	27 May 2013	Elected a voivodeship marshal of Subcarpathia	Zdzisław Pupa	8 September 2013 (15,84%)	19 September 2013
Henryk Górski	19 May 2014	Death	Maria Koc	7 September 2014 (6.62%)	24 September 2014
Beata Gosiewska	25 May 2014	Elected a MEP for Lesser Poland and Świętokrzyskie	Jarosław Rusiecki	7 September 2014 (7.93%)	24 September 2014
Bolesław Piecha	25 May 2014	Elected a MEP for Silesia	Izabela Kloc	7 September 2014 (9.44%)	24 September 2014
Elżbieta Bieńkowska	31 October 2014	Resigned	Czesław Ryszka	8 February 2015 (7.34%)	4 May 2015
Marek Ziółkowski	7 July 2015	Appointed a Polish Ambasador to Morocco	Vacant (127 days)	—	

== See also ==
- List of Sejm members (2011–2015)
