= 2011 Polish parliamentary election =

- 9 October 2011
- Opinion polls
- Registered: 30,762,931
- Sejm

All 460 seats in the Sejm 231 seats needed for a majority
- Turnout: 15,050,027 (48.92%) ▼4.9 pp
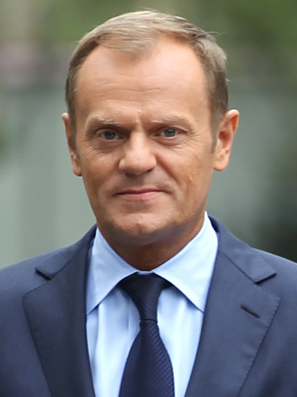

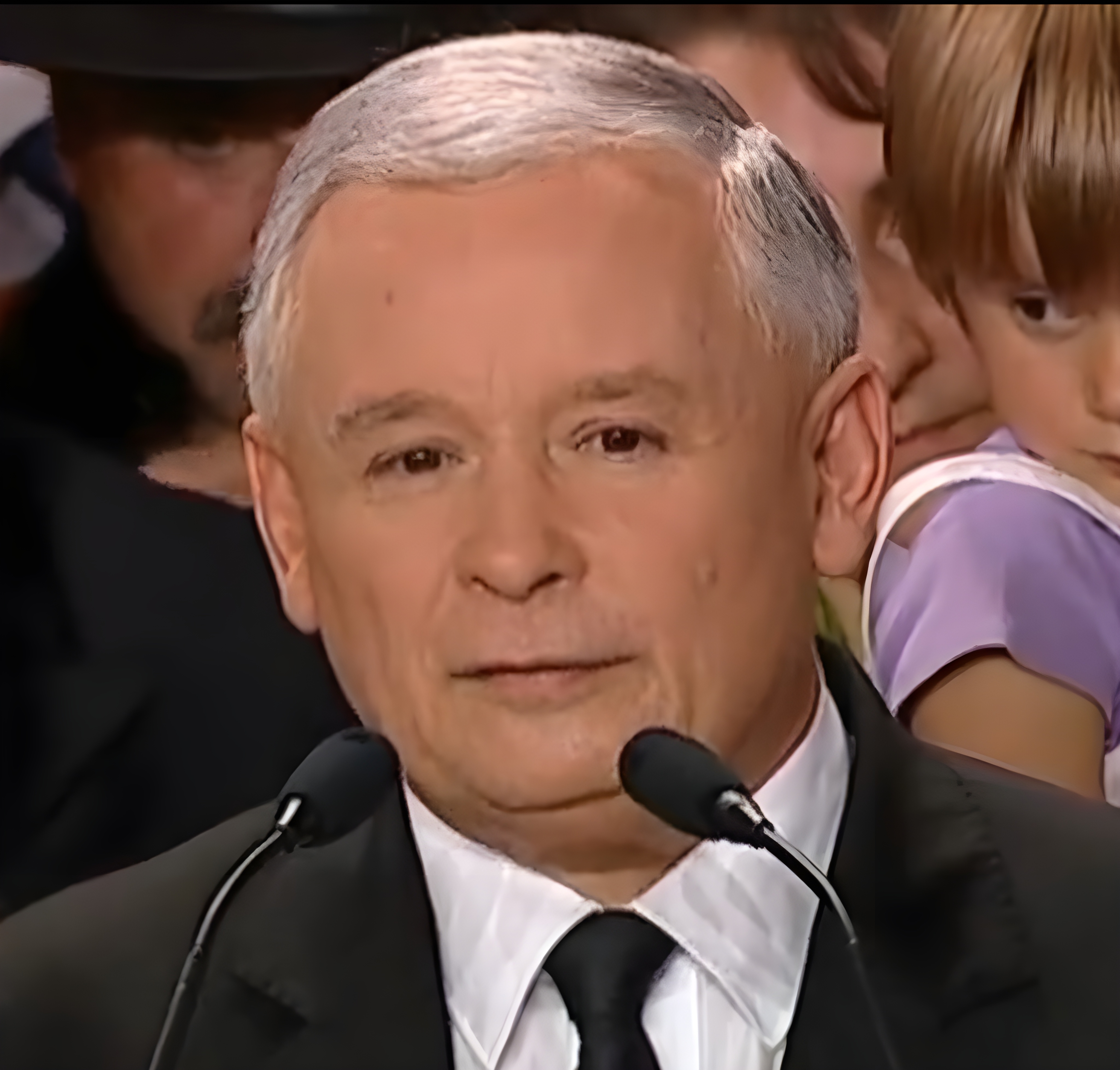

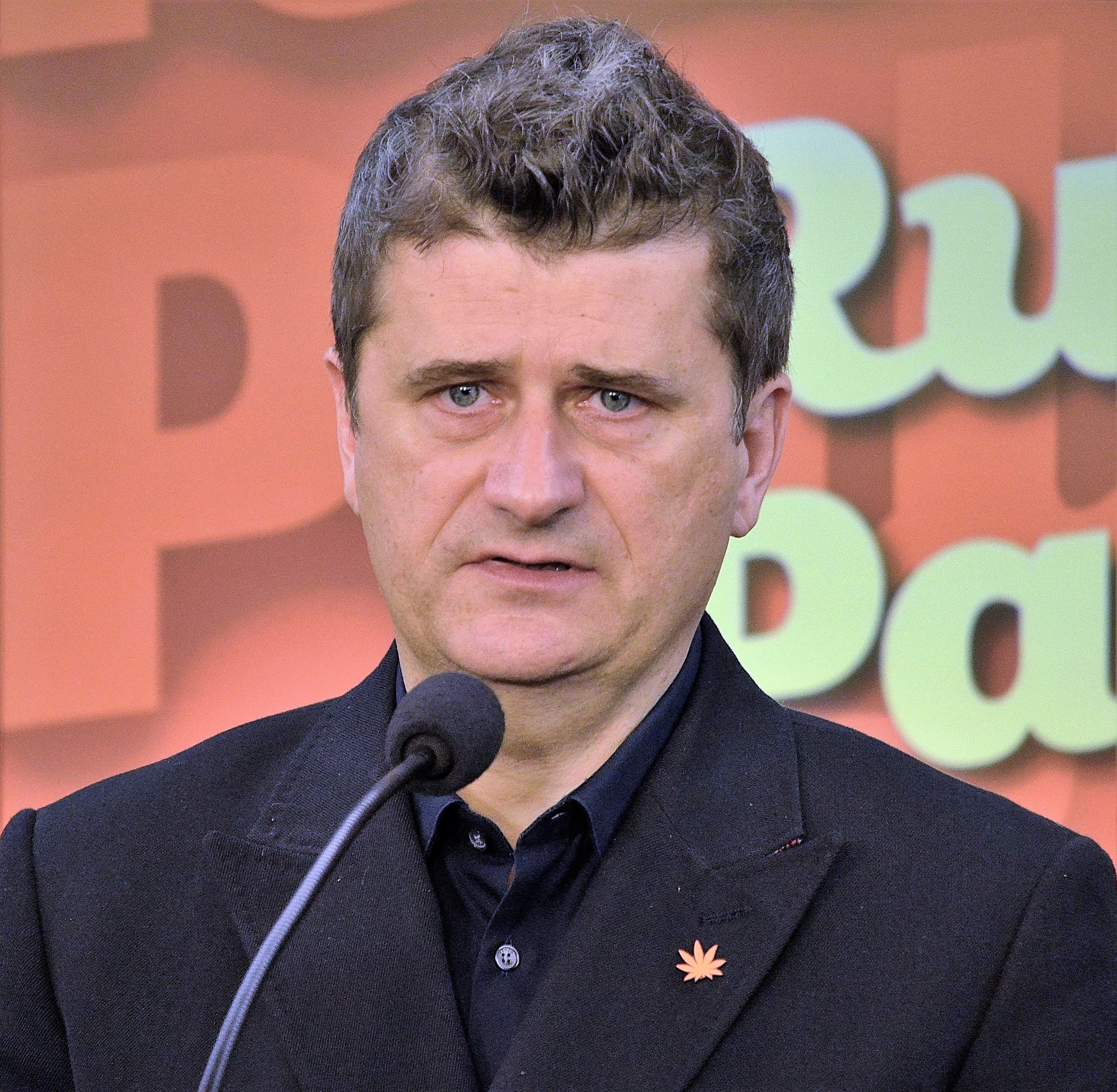

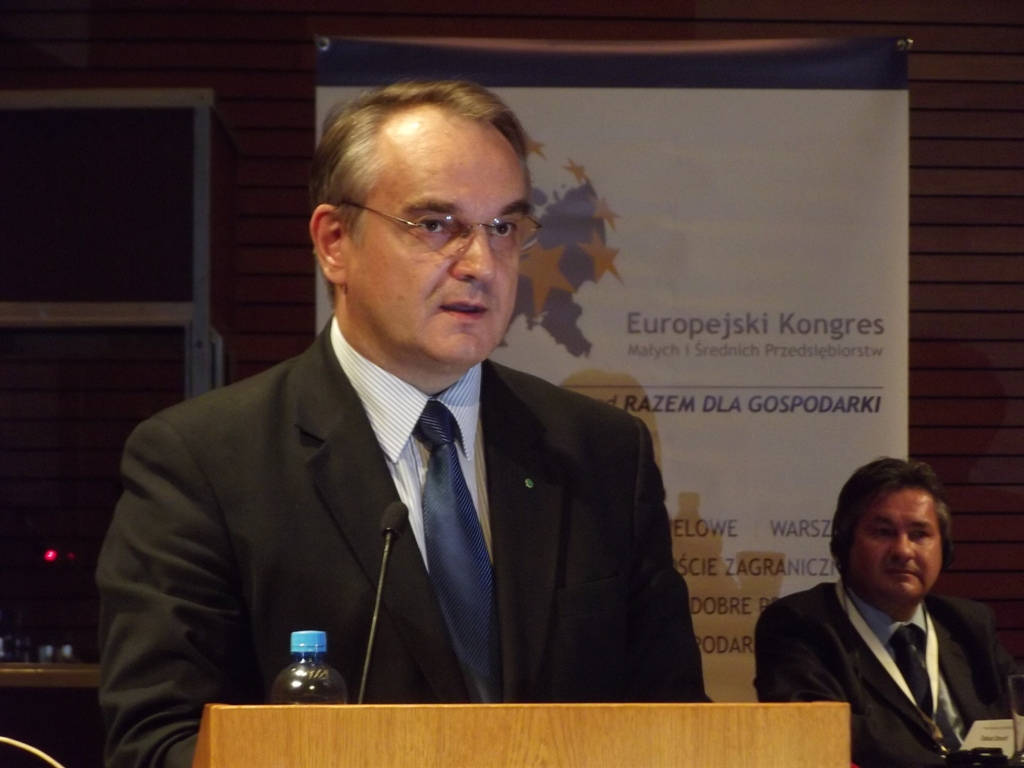

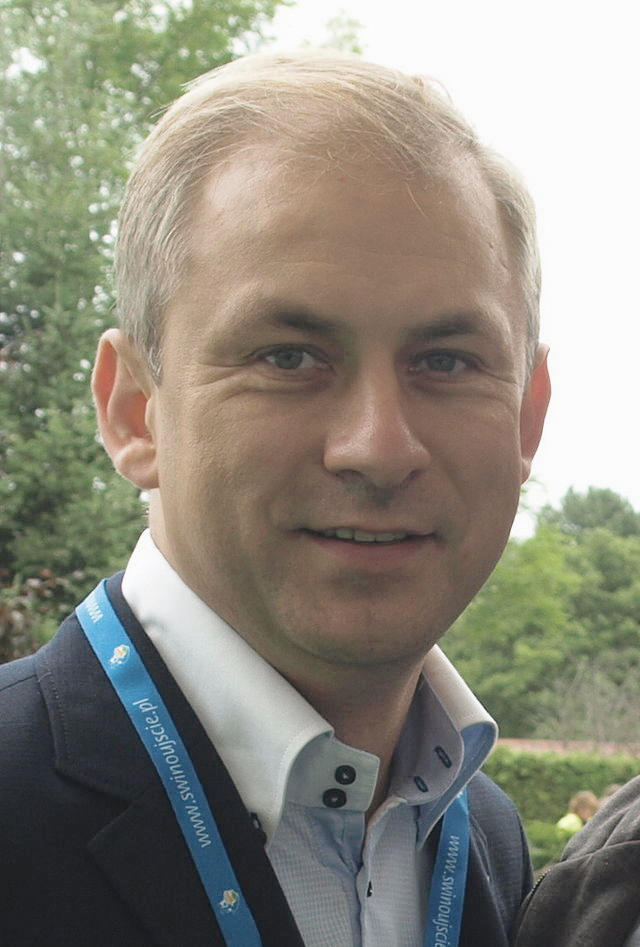

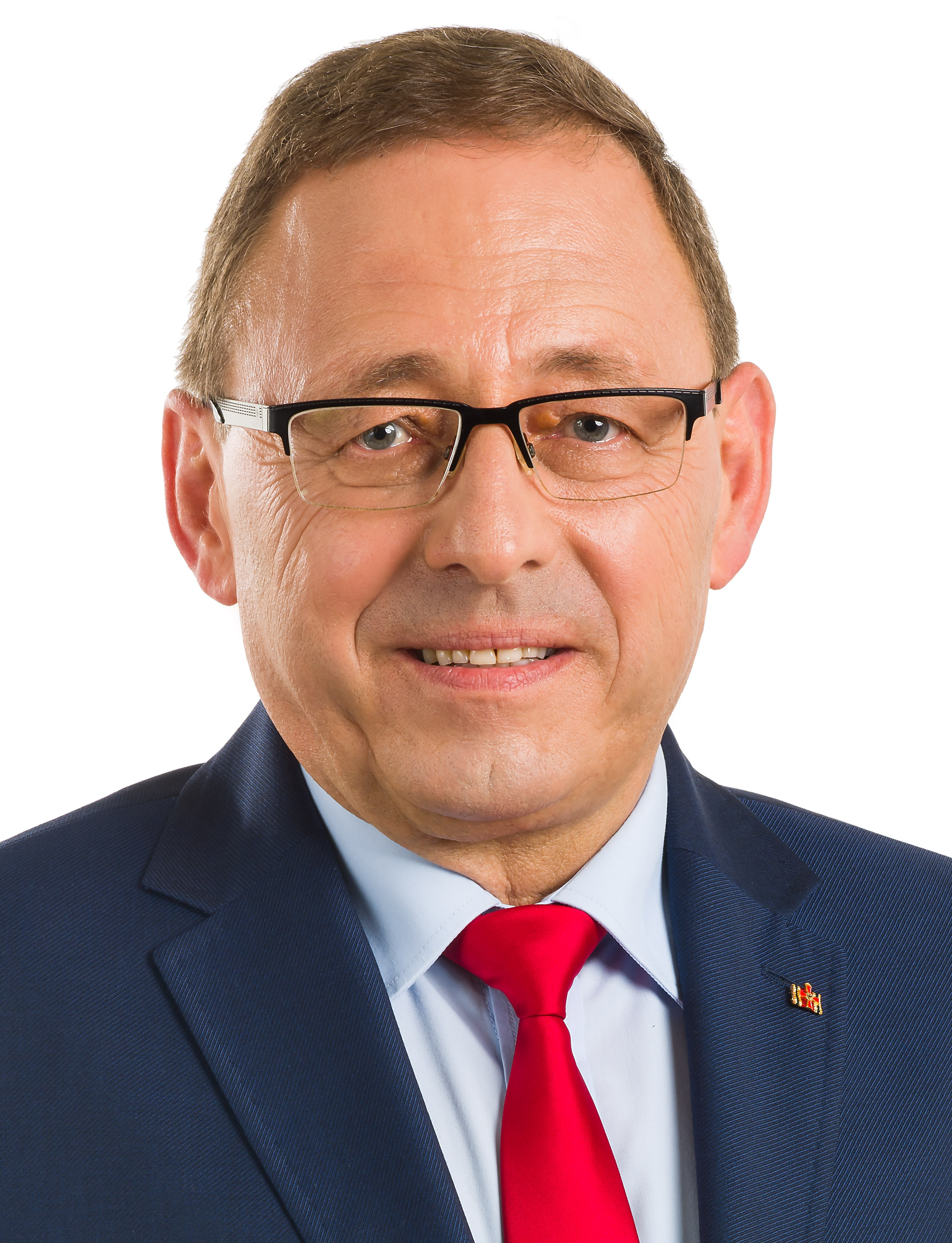
	Majority party	Minority party	Third party
Leader	Donald Tusk	Jarosław Kaczyński	Janusz Palikot
Party	PO	PiS	RP
Leader since	1 June 2003	18 January 2003	1 June 2011
Last election	41.5%, 209 seats	32.1%, 166 seats	Did not exist
Seats won	207	157	40
Seat change	▼2	▼9	New
Popular vote	5,629,773	4,295,016	1,439,490
Percentage	39.2%	29.9%	10.0%
Swing	▼2.3 pp	▼2.2 pp	New party
	Fourth party	Fifth party	Sixth party
Leader	Waldemar Pawlak	Grzegorz Napieralski	Ryszard Galla
Party	PSL	SLD	KWMN
Leader since	29 January 2005	31 May 2008	20 January 2008
Last election	8.9%, 31 seats	13.2%, 53 seats	0.2%, 1 seat
Seats won	28	27	1
Seat change	▼3	▼26	0
Popular vote	1,201,628	1,184,303	28,014
Percentage	8.4%	8.2%	0.2%
Swing	▼0.5 pp	▼5.0 pp	0.0 pp
- Senate
- All 100 seats in the Senate; 51 seats needed for a majority
- Turnout: 15,048,260 (48.92%) ▼4.89 pp
Party	Vote %	Seats	+/–
PO	35.60	63	+3
PiS	26.94	31	−8
PSL	9.39	2	+2
KWW Rafał Dutkiewicz	1.80	1	+1
Independent	7.87	3	+2
This lists parties that won seats. See the complete results below.

Government before	Government after
First Tusk cabinet PO—PSL	Second Tusk cabinet PO—PSL

Parliamentary elections were held in Poland on 9 October 2011. All 460 members of the Sejm and 100 senators of the Senate were elected. The ruling Civic Platform (PO) won a plurality of seats and Tusk became the first Polish prime minister to be appointed for a second consecutive term since the fall of communism. Both the Civic Platform and its junior partner, the Polish People's Party (PSL), agreed to continue their governing coalition after the election.

== Electoral system ==
The election was for all 460 seats of the Sejm and all 100 seats of the Senate. Candidates for Deputies are nominated either by the electoral committees of the various political parties and or by individual voter committees. The process of election for the Sejm is through party-list proportional representation via the D'hondt method in multi-seat constituencies (41 in total), with a 5% threshold for single parties and 8% threshold for coalitions (requirements waived for national minorities).

The election was the first one to take place under a new Election Code which altered the electoral system in the Senate election from a plurality block voting to the first-past-the-post voting, with one member to be returned in each of the 100 single member constituencies.

There were 25,993 precincts for 30,512,850 voters.

Senate constituencies.

== Election date ==
The date of the election, October 9, was set by the President of Poland, Bronisław Komorowski, and announced on 4 July. The latest possible date for the election to be held was 30 October 2011, four years after the previous election. Prior to the announcement of the election date, the most likely dates were thought to be 16 October or 23 October.

Although the governing coalition had a strong majority, it was suggested that the elections be brought forward to the spring, to avoid the campaign interrupting Poland's Presidency of the Council of the European Union in the second half of the year. The idea was supported by the Democratic Left Alliance and Poland Comes First, but firmly opposed by Law and Justice. The Civic Platform favoured an election date of 23 October. Since the State Electoral Commission decided that 30 October falls too close to the national holiday of All Saints' Day, and elections are always held on Sundays, 23 October was the latest possible date to hold the election. In the end, Komorowski decided on 9 October.

The idea of holding the election over two days instead of the usual one, to increase turnout, was raised. An election over two days would have cost 130–140 million złoty, compared to 90 million for a one-day election. The single day election option prevailed.

== Parties ==
Civic Platform (PO), the largest governing party under prime minister Donald Tusk, was seeking reelection. Opinion polls over the past four years had fairly consistently shown the PO to have the largest level of popular support among Poland's political parties. PO was seeking either to win majority government in its own right, or to continue its coalition with the smaller Polish People's Party (PSL). During the election campaign, prime minister Donald Tusk ruled out the possibility of a coalition with either Law and Justice or Palikot's Movement.

Law and Justice Law and Justice (PiS), is Poland's second largest party as of 2007, and was the leading party of government from 2005 to 2007. PiS's greatest difficulty this election, was not only that it trailed PO in popular support, but that even if it were to outpoll the PO, it might have had difficulty in finding other parties willing to enter into a coalition with it. Jarosław Kaczyński had publicly denied the possibility of allying his party with the post-communist SLD and relations with the PSL (traditionally viewed by the media as an opportunist coalition partner, ready to form a coalition with everyone) were tense. This tension was exacerbated following PiS's spokesperson Adam Hofman's statement during the election campaign, in which he attacked PSL members in an abusive manner following the airing of the People's Party newest electoral TV ad.

Democratic Left Alliance Poland's strongest left-wing party, the Democratic Left Alliance (SLD) had struggled since 2005 to regain its position as one of the countries two largest parties. The SLD indicated its potential interest in being a coalition partner with PO following the election.

Polish People's Party The Polish People's Party (PSL) is an agrarian-rooted party. It was the minority partner in a coalition government with PO. Although some opinion polls showed popular support for PSL to be dangerously close to the 5% electoral threshold, in the past PSL generally performed a little better than opinion polls indicated. It is widely seen as a coalition partner for every party that happens to need such.

Palikot's Movement Palikot's Movement (Ruch Palikota), officially the Movement of Support (Ruch Poparcia, RP), is a breakaway faction of the PO that followed MP Janusz Palikot after he had been expelled from the party for his "scandalous" remarks on late President Lech Kaczyński. The RP is distinctive on Poland's political scene in that it is the first party in the country's history that puts strong emphasis on its program's anticlerical features (the usual practice being that parties either try to win the Church's unofficial support or at least do not try to appear anti-Church) along with appeals for putting an end to the anti-abortion policy and introducing civil unions for same-sex couples. In terms of economy, the RP blends leftist and rightist ideas.

Poland Comes First A new party on the Polish political scene, Poland Comes First (PJN), emerged as a splinter group from PiS, following the 2010 Polish presidential election. PJN's future parliamentary representation was uncertain, given that most opinion polls showed support levels for PJN to be below the 5% electoral threshold. The party had suffered an almost constant internal crisis since its very foundation that led many of its MPs to leave it for the other parties in Parliament, including the most famous one, chairwoman Joanna Kluzik-Rostkowska, who joined the PO. Commentators argue that the PJN failed to establish itself as a real alternative on the political scene, being widely perceived as nothing but a milder variant of the party it had once left.

Other parties The only other party contesting all 41 electoral districts for the Sejm in 2011, was the Polish Labour Party (PPP). The remaining parties include Congress of the New Right (KNP) (21 districts), Right of the Republic (PR) (20 districts), Our Homeland Poland (NDP) (9 districts) and German Minority group (MN) (1 district). With the exception of the German Minority group (which as an ethnic minority party is exempt from the 5% election threshold requirement), these parties were not expected to poll the required 5% to enter the Sejm. Some other minor parties, had decided not to contest the elections independently, opting instead to negotiate a place for their candidates on the electoral lists of the larger parties. This strategy had worked for some minor parties in past elections, and seen them get some of their candidates elected in this way.

== Campaign ==
Tusk campaigned on a platform that drew on the record of its economic success during the previous government. He also said that he would pursue a "steady rapprochement" with Russia, in spite of prior rows over missile defence, gas pipelines and the inquiry into the plane crash that killed Poland's former president in 2010. Conversely the Law and Justice Party had been distrustful of Russia and Germany.

== Monitors ==
Various delegations from the electoral boards and of political party representatives from Tunisia, Egypt and Libya, due to hold their own free elections in the coming months, monitored the election in Warsaw, Radom and Płock at the invitations of the Foreign Ministry, as Deputy Foreign Minister Krzysztof Stanowski said that "I hope the climax of our help comes when [the countries’ policymakers] begin discussing the constitution, reforms in economy and local government." Rania Mbarki, from a local election commission in Tunis, said that "it's obligatory to stand in the voting booth before putting pen to paper. Here, the ballot papers are marked on tables with families around. There is a discussion. In our country it's confidential, we can't say what we have chosen, you can't show what you have chosen, so this is different for us;" while Mounira Belghouthi, from a local election board in Kairouan, added that the advanced voting machines were more technologically advanced than in Tunisia and they sought to get an idea its usage.

== Opinion polls ==
Graphical summary of opinion polls: Civic Platform Law and Justice Palikot's Movement Polish People's Party Democratic Left Alliance Poland Comes First Self-Defence ~~League of Polish Families~~

== Results ==
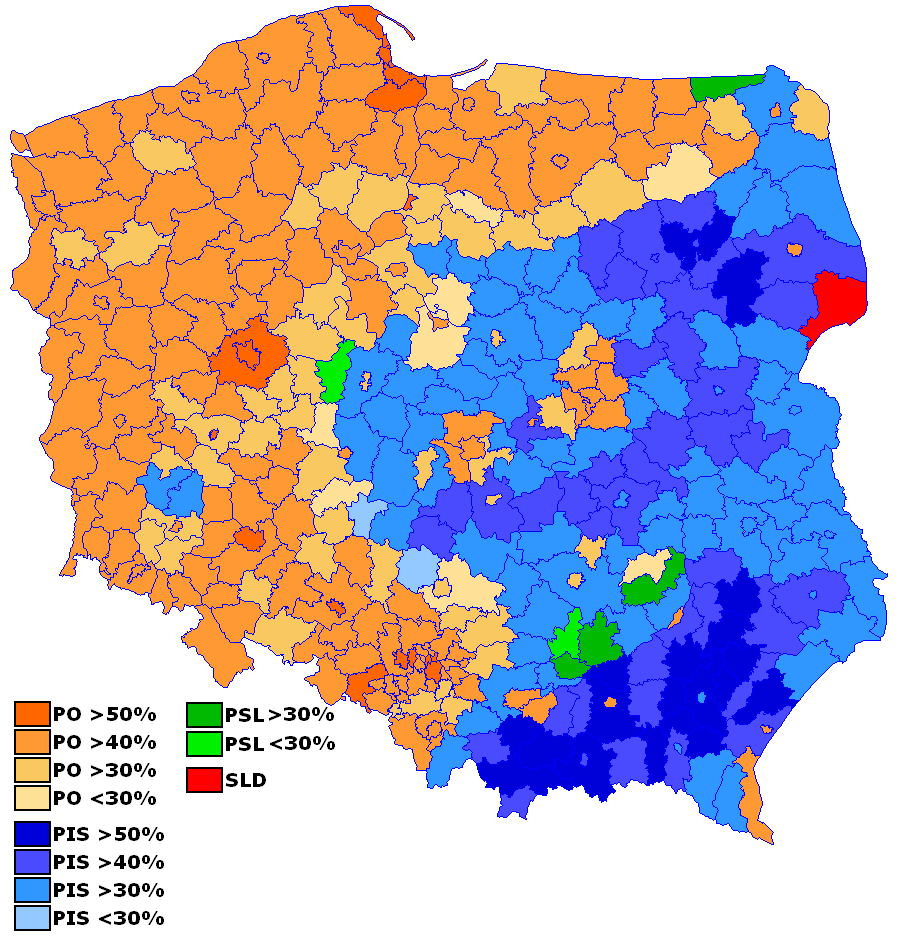
Powiats won by: ■ – Civic Platform ■ – Law and Justice ■ – Polish People's Party ■ – Democratic Left Alliance

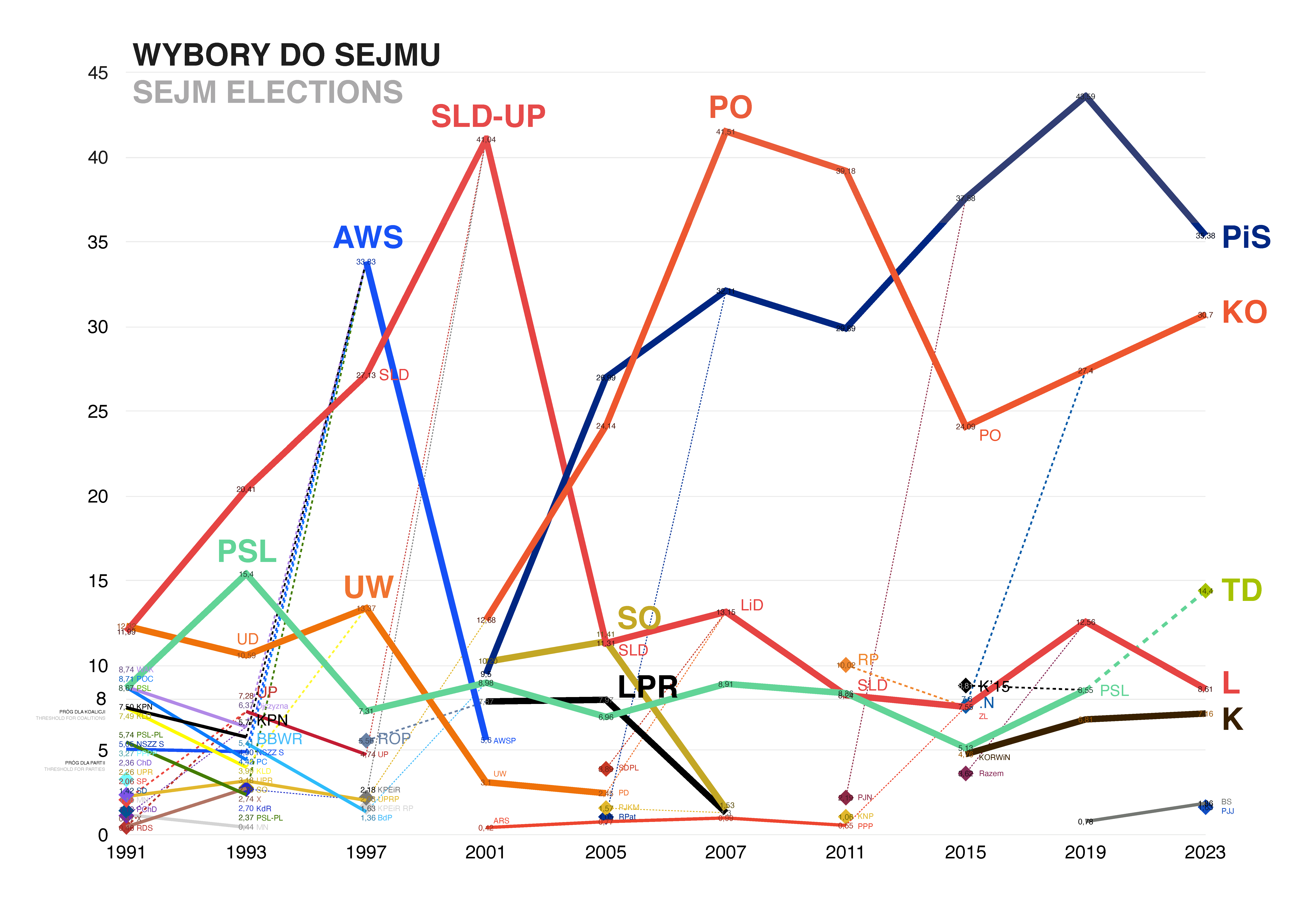
Sejm election result

Senate election result by constituency.

With all votes counted, voter turnout was 48.92%. In the Sejm, Poznań recorded the highest turnout of 60.2% and Elbląg recorded the lowest turnout with 41.24%. The valid votes were 95.48% of the ballots. In the Senate, voter turnout was 48.92% with one of Warszawa I's seats recording the highest turnout of 73.61% and Opole recording the lowest turnout with 38.1%. The valid votes were 96.57% of the ballots.

The Civic Platform party won a plurality with 207 seats in the Sejm, followed by the Law and Justice Party with 157 seats. The breakaway Palikot Movement won 40 seats and the second biggest incumbent coalition party, the Polish People's Party, won 28 seats. The Democratic Left Alliance got 27 seats. In the Senate, Civic Platform won an absolute majority with 63 seats, while Law & Justice came away with 31. The only other party to achieve Senate representation was the Polish People's Party, which won 2 seats. Four independents were also elected.

=== Sejm ===
Party	Votes	%	Seats	+/–
Civic Platform	5,629,773	39.18	207	–2
Law and Justice	4,295,016	29.89	157	–9
Palikot's Movement	1,439,490	10.02	40	New
Polish People's Party	1,201,628	8.36	28	–3
Democratic Left Alliance	1,184,303	8.24	27	–26
Poland Comes First	315,393	2.19	0	New
Congress of the New Right	151,837	1.06	0	New
Polish Labour Party	79,147	0.55	0	0
Right Wing of the Republic	35,169	0.24	0	New
German Minority Electoral Committee	28,014	0.19	1	0
Our Home Poland	9,733	0.07	0	0
Total	14,369,503	100.00	460	0
Valid votes	14,369,503	95.48		
Invalid/blank votes	680,524	4.52		
Total votes	15,050,027	100.00		
Registered voters/turnout	30,762,931	48.92		
Source: PKW

==== Party breakdown ====
Party or alliance		Votes	%	Seats
Civic Platform	Civic Platform	5,123,486	35.66	191
Civic Platform	Independents	491,259	3.42	16
Civic Platform	Social Democracy of Poland	13,716	0.10	0
Civic Platform	Democratic Party – demokraci.pl	1,312	0.01	0
Civic Platform	Total	5,629,773	39.18	207
Law and Justice	Law and Justice	3,545,517	24.67	132
Law and Justice	Independents	679,793	4.73	23
Law and Justice	National-Catholic Movement	48,647	0.34	1
Law and Justice	Movement for Reconstruction of Poland	10,999	0.08	1
Law and Justice	Piast Faction	8,678	0.06	0
Law and Justice	Right Wing of the Republic (Note: Individual members running on lists different from their own parties)	1,382	0.01	0
Law and Justice	Total	4,295,016	29.89	157
Palikot's Movement	Palikot's Movement	1,011,558	7.04	34
Palikot's Movement	Independents	310,325	2.16	4
Palikot's Movement	Reason Party	94,422	0.66	1
Palikot's Movement	Democratic Left Alliance	19,451	0.14	1
Palikot's Movement	Democratic Party – demokraci.pl	1,614	0.01	0
Palikot's Movement	Polish People's Party	1,534	0.01	0
Palikot's Movement	Total	1,438,904	10.01	40
Polish People's Party	Polish People's Party	966,426	6.73	27
Polish People's Party	Independents	235,105	1.64	1
Polish People's Party	Total	1,201,531	8.36	28
Democratic Left Alliance	Democratic Left Alliance	947,056	6.59	27
Democratic Left Alliance	Independents	164,830	1.15	0
Democratic Left Alliance	Labour Union	20,059	0.14	0
Democratic Left Alliance	Women's Party	13,751	0.10	0
Democratic Left Alliance	Greens 2004	12,445	0.09	0
Democratic Left Alliance	Social Democracy of Poland	11,279	0.08	0
Democratic Left Alliance	National Party of Retirees and Pensioners	7,326	0.05	0
Democratic Left Alliance	Democratic Party – demokraci.pl	5,040	0.04	0
Democratic Left Alliance	Movement for Economic Revival	1,035	0.01	0
Democratic Left Alliance	Party of Regions	598	0.00	0
Democratic Left Alliance	Polish Communist Party	518	0.00	0
Democratic Left Alliance	Polish Socialist Party	360	0.00	0
Democratic Left Alliance	Reason Party	312	0.00	0
Democratic Left Alliance	Self-Defence of the Republic of Poland	190	0.00	0
Democratic Left Alliance	Total	1,184,799	8.25	27
Poland Comes First	Poland Comes First	192,283	1.34	0
Poland Comes First	Independents	120,476	0.84	0
Poland Comes First	Alliance of Democrats	530	0.00	0
Poland Comes First	Polish People's Party	516	0.00	0
Poland Comes First	National People's Movement	382	0.00	0
Poland Comes First	Conservative People's Party	286	0.00	0
Poland Comes First	League of Polish Families	265	0.00	0
Poland Comes First	National Party of Retirees and Pensioners	260	0.00	0
Poland Comes First	Law and Justice	239	0.00	0
Poland Comes First	Union of Polish Monarchist Groups	156	0.00	0
Poland Comes First	Total	315,393	2.19	0
New Right of Janusz Korwin-Mikke	Congress of the New Right	78,359	0.55	0
New Right of Janusz Korwin-Mikke	Independents	69,133	0.48	0
New Right of Janusz Korwin-Mikke	Real Politics Union	3,310	0.02	0
New Right of Janusz Korwin-Mikke	Party of Greens of the Republic of Poland	907	0.01	0
New Right of Janusz Korwin-Mikke	League of Polish Families	128	0.00	0
New Right of Janusz Korwin-Mikke	Total	151,837	1.06	0
Polish Labour Party - August 80	Independents	44,217	0.31	0
Polish Labour Party - August 80	Polish Labour Party - August 80	31,857	0.22	0
Polish Labour Party - August 80	Self-Defence	3,012	0.02	0
Polish Labour Party - August 80	Total	79,086	0.55	0
Right Wing of the Republic	Independents	19,964	0.14	0
Right Wing of the Republic	Right Wing of the Republic	10,884	0.08	0
Right Wing of the Republic	Real Politics Union	3,267	0.02	0
Right Wing of the Republic	Piast Faction	370	0.00	0
Right Wing of the Republic	League of Polish Families	360	0.00	0
Right Wing of the Republic	Europe of the Free Homelands	65	0.00	0
Right Wing of the Republic	Organisation of the Polish Nation - Polish League	59	0.00	0
Right Wing of the Republic	Christian Democracy of the Third Polish Republic	41	0.00	0
Right Wing of the Republic	Polish Agreement	31	0.00	0
Right Wing of the Republic	Labour Party	18	0.00	0
Right Wing of the Republic	Total	35,059	0.24	0
German Minority	Independents	28,014	0.19	1
Our Home Poland – Andrzej Lepper's Self-Defence	Self-Defence of the Republic of Poland	7,102	0.05	0
Our Home Poland – Andrzej Lepper's Self-Defence	Independents	2,552	0.02	0
Our Home Poland – Andrzej Lepper's Self-Defence	League of Polish Families	60	0.00	0
Our Home Poland – Andrzej Lepper's Self-Defence	Patriotic Poland	19	0.00	0
Our Home Poland – Andrzej Lepper's Self-Defence	Total	9,733	0.07	0
Total		14,369,145	100.00	460
Source: Pliki Do Pobrania Okręgi wyborcze National Electoral Commission (Note: In result breakdown by candidate provided by the National Electoral Commission, the sum of party votes are different from final released vote totals for coalitions for Palikot's Movement (by 586), Polish People's Party (by 96), Democratic Left Alliance (by 496), Polish Labour Party - August 80 (by 61) and Right Wing of the Republic (by 110). In the table, figures provided for each party are taken from the candidate breakdown while coalition sums are taken from the final result.)

=== Senate ===
Party	Votes	%	Seats	+/–
Civic Platform	5,173,300	35.60	63	+3
Law and Justice	3,915,355	26.94	31	–8
Polish People's Party	1,363,796	9.39	2	+2
Democratic Left Alliance	1,355,151	9.33	0	0
Citizens to the Senate	504,792	3.47	0	New
Rafał Dutkiewicz Electoral Committee	261,135	1.80	1	New
Autonomy for Upper Silesia	147,710	1.02	0	New
Poland Comes First	109,182	0.75	0	New
Right Wing of the Republic	82,115	0.57	0	New
Polish Labour Party	76,913	0.53	0	New
Congress of the New Right	73,028	0.50	0	New
W. Lubawskiego Senate for Citizens	39,639	0.27	0	New
Podhalanie	38,243	0.26	0	New
German Minority Electoral Committee	34,247	0.24	0	0
Civic Poland	33,422	0.23	0	New
San Valley Self-Government	25,296	0.17	0	New
Nowy Ekran	23,369	0.16	0	New
Bezpartyjni.pl	19,825	0.14	0	New
League for the Defence of Sovereignty	19,440	0.13	0	New
Confederation, Dignity and Rule of Law	18,277	0.13	0	New
Our Home Poland	16,314	0.11	0	0
Alliance for Poland	13,809	0.10	0	New
Democratic Party	12,800	0.09	0	0
Independent to the Senate	10,242	0.07	0	New
League of Polish Families	8,167	0.06	0	0
Ojcowizna	3,227	0.02	0	New
Patriotic Poland	3,482	0.02	0	New
Slavic Union	2,977	0.02	0	0
National Revival of Poland	2,934	0.02	0	0
Independents	1,143,275	7.87	3	+2
Total	14,531,462	100.00	100	0
Valid votes	14,531,462	96.57		
Invalid/blank votes	516,798	3.43		
Total votes	15,048,260	100.00		
Registered voters/turnout	30,762,931	48.92		
Source: PKW, Plankton Polityczny

==== By constituency ====
#	Voivodeship	Commission	#	Party	Elected member
1	Lower Silesian	Legnica	I	Civic Coalition	Jan Michalski
2	Lower Silesian	Legnica	II	Civic Coalition	Józef Pinior
3	Lower Silesian	Legnica	III	Law and Justice	Dorota Czudowska
4	Lower Silesian	Wałbrzych	I	Civic Coalition	Wiesław Kilian
5	Lower Silesian	Wałbrzych	II	Civic Coalition	Stanisław Jurcewicz
6	Lower Silesian	Wrocław	I	Civic Coalition	Jarosław Duda
7	Lower Silesian	Wrocław	II	Civic Coalition	Alicja Chybicka
8	Lower Silesian	Wrocław	III	Rafał Dutkiewicz Electoral Committee	Jarosław Obremski
9	Kuyavian-Pomeranian	Bydgoszcz	I	Civic Coalition	Andrzej Kobiak
10	Kuyavian-Pomeranian	Bydgoszcz	II	Civic Coalition	Jan Rulewski
11	Kuyavian-Pomeranian	Toruń	I	Civic Coalition	Jan Wyrowiński
12	Kuyavian-Pomeranian	Toruń	II	Civic Coalition	Michał Wojtczak
13	Kuyavian-Pomeranian	Toruń	III	Civic Coalition	Andrzej Person
14	Lublin	Lublin	I	Law and Justice	Stanisław Gogacz
15	Lublin	Lublin	II	Law and Justice	Grzegorz Czelej
16	Lublin	Lublin	III	Law and Justice	Henryk Cioch
17	Lublin	Chełm	I	Law and Justice	Grzegorz Bierecki
18	Lublin	Chełm	II	Polish People's Party	Józef Zając
19	Lublin	Chełm	III	Law and Justice	Jerzy Chróścikowski
20	Lubusz	Zielona Góra	I	Civic Coalition	Stanisław Iwan
21	Lubusz	Zielona Góra	II	Civic Coalition	Helena Hatka
22	Lubusz	Zielona Góra	III	Civic Coalition	Robert Dowhan
23	Łódź	Łódź	I	Civic Coalition	Maciej Grubski
24	Łódź	Łódź	II	Civic Coalition	Ryszard Bonisławski
25	Łódź	Sieradz	I	Law and Justice	Przemysław Błaszczyk
26	Łódź	Sieradz	II	Civic Coalition	Andrzej Owczarek
27	Łódź	Sieradz	III	Law and Justice	Michał Seweryński
28	Łódź	Piotrków Trybunalski	I	Law and Justice	Wiesław Dobkowski
29	Łódź	Piotrków Trybunalski	II	Law and Justice	Grzegorz Wojciechowski
30	Lesser Poland	Kraków	I	Law and Justice	Andrzej Pająk
31	Lesser Poland	Kraków	II	Law and Justice	Bogdan Pęk
32	Lesser Poland	Kraków	III	Civic Coalition	Janusz Sepioł
33	Lesser Poland	Kraków	IV	Civic Coalition	Bogdan Klich
34	Lesser Poland	Tarnów	I	Law and Justice	Maciej Klima
35	Lesser Poland	Tarnów	II	Law and Justice	Kazimierz Wiatr
36	Lesser Poland	Nowy Sącz	I	Civic Coalition	Stanisław Hodorowicz
37	Lesser Poland	Nowy Sącz	II	Law and Justice	Stanisław Kogut
38	Masovian	Płock	I	Law and Justice	Marek Martynowski
39	Masovian	Płock	II	Law and Justice	Jan Jackowski
40	Masovian	Warszawa	I	Civic Coalition	Anna Aksamit
41	Masovian	Warszawa	II	Civic Coalition	Łukasz Abgarowicz
42	Masovian	Warszawa	III	Independent	Marek Borowski
43	Masovian	Warszawa	IV	Civic Coalition	Marek Rocki
44	Masovian	Warszawa	V	Civic Coalition	Barbara Borys-Damięcka
45	Masovian	Warszawa	VI	Civic Coalition	Aleksander Pociej
46	Masovian	Siedlce	I	Law and Justice	Robert Mamątow
47	Masovian	Siedlce	II	Law and Justice	Henryk Górski
48	Masovian	Siedlce	III	Law and Justice	Waldemar Kraska
49	Masovian	Radom	I	Law and Justice	Stanisław Karczewski
50	Masovian	Radom	II	Law and Justice	Wojciech Skurkiewicz
51	Opole	Opole	I	Civic Coalition	Ryszard Knosala
52	Opole	Opole	II	Civic Coalition	Piotr Wach
53	Opole	Opole	III	Civic Coalition	Aleksander Świeykowski
54	Subcarpathian	Rzeszów	I	Law and Justice	Janina Sagatowska
55	Subcarpathian	Rzeszów	II	Law and Justice	Władysław Ortyl
56	Subcarpathian	Rzeszów	III	Law and Justice	Kazimierz Jaworski
57	Subcarpathian	Krosno	I	Law and Justice	Alicja Zając
58	Subcarpathian	Krosno	II	Law and Justice	Andrzej Matusiewicz
59	Podlaskie	Białystok	I	Law and Justice	Bohdan Paszkowski
60	Podlaskie	Białystok	II	Civic Coalition	Tadeusz Arłukowicz
61	Podlaskie	Białystok	III	Independent	Włodzimierz Cimoszewicz
62	Pomeranian	Słupsk	I	Civic Coalition	Kazimierz Kleina
63	Pomeranian	Słupsk	II	Civic Coalition	Roman Zaborowski
64	Pomeranian	Słupsk	III	Civic Coalition	Edmund Wittbrodt
65	Pomeranian	Gdańsk	I	Civic Coalition	Bogdan Borusewicz
66	Pomeranian	Gdańsk	II	Civic Coalition	Andrzej Grzyb
67	Pomeranian	Gdańsk	III	Civic Coalition	Leszek Czarnobaj
68	Silesian	Częstochowa	I	Civic Coalition	Jarosław Lasecki
69	Silesian	Częstochowa	II	Civic Coalition	Andrzej Szewiński
70	Silesian	Katowice	I	Civic Coalition	Maria Pańczyk-Pozdziej
71	Silesian	Katowice	II	Civic Coalition	Andrzej Misiołek
72	Silesian	Bielsko-Biała	I	Civic Coalition	Adam Zdziebło
73	Silesian	Bielsko-Biała	II	Civic Coalition	Antoni Motyczka
74	Silesian	Katowice	III	Civic Coalition	Leszek Piechota
75	Silesian	Katowice	IV	Civic Coalition	Elżbieta Bieńkowska
76	Silesian	Katowice	V	Civic Coalition	Zbigniew Meres
77	Silesian	Katowice	VI	Civic Coalition	Bogusław Śmigielski
78	Silesian	Bielsko-Biała	III	Civic Coalition	Rafał Muchacki
79	Silesian	Bielsko-Biała	IV	Civic Coalition	Tadeusz Kopeć
80	Silesian	Katowice	VII	Independent	Kazimierz Kutz
81	Świętokrzyskie	Kielce	I	Law and Justice	Mieczysław Gil
82	Świętokrzyskie	Kielce	II	Law and Justice	Beata Gosiewska
83	Świętokrzyskie	Kielce	III	Law and Justice	Krzysztof Słoń
84	Warmian-Masurian	Elbląg	I	Civic Coalition	Witold Gintowt-Dziewałtowski
85	Warmian-Masurian	Elbląg	II	Civic Coalition	Stanisław Gorczyca
86	Warmian-Masurian	Olsztyn	I	Civic Coalition	Ryszard Górecki
87	Warmian-Masurian	Olsztyn	II	Civic Coalition	Marek Konopka
88	Greater Poland	Piła	I	Civic Coalition	Mieczysław Augustyn
89	Greater Poland	Piła	II	Civic Coalition	Jan Libicki
90	Greater Poland	Poznań	I	Civic Coalition	Marek Ziółkowski
91	Greater Poland	Poznań	II	Civic Coalition	Jadwiga Rotnicka
92	Greater Poland	Konin	I	Civic Coalition	Piotr Gruszczyński
93	Greater Poland	Konin	II	Civic Coalition	Ireneusz Niewiarowski
94	Greater Poland	Kalisz	I	Civic Coalition	Marian Poślednik
95	Greater Poland	Kalisz	II	Polish People's Party	Andżelika Możdżanowska
96	Greater Poland	Kalisz	III	Civic Coalition	Witold Sitarz
97	West Pomeranian	Szczecin	I	Civic Coalition	Norbert Obrycki
98	West Pomeranian	Szczecin	II	Civic Coalition	Sławomir Preiss
99	West Pomeranian	Koszalin	I	Civic Coalition	Grażyna Sztark
100	West Pomeranian	Koszalin	II	Civic Coalition	Piotr Zientarski

=== Reactions ===
Civic Platform's Donald Tusk said of the victory that: "It is the highest honour for me and for Civic Platform that we will be working for the next four years for all of you, regardless of who you voted for today. In the next four years we will work twice as hard." The Law and Justice Party's Jaroslaw Kaczynski conceded defeat. Polish financial markets reacted positively to the outcome, while the zloty rose.

== Analysis ==
The Civic Platform was considered to be the big winner of the election, being the only Polish political party to have achieved reelection over the past 20 years of democratic elections. Further to that, PO saw only a very small voter swing against it (-2.3%) and a loss of only two seats from its 2007 outcome which was a record result. The other big winner, was the newly established Palikot Movement, which managed to poll double figures (10%) to come in at third place, ahead of PSL and SLD, both of which were longstanding established parties. Opinion polls, of only a month or so prior to the election, had Palikot's Movement at around 2% of the vote, well below the election threshold. The Polish People's Party (8.4%) managed to hang on to its support base (despite some opinion polls suggesting that they would struggle to achieve the threshold), allowing it to continue its coalition with PO, and maintain its level of representation in the new government.

On the other hand, Law and Justice was one of the big losers in the election. PiS was seeking to defeat PO, but failed to even lift its own vote (falling from over 32% in 2007 to less than 30% in 2011). The other big loser was the Democratic Left Alliance, which for the first time in its history failed to achieve a result above 10% (2001 -40%, 2005 - 11%, 2007 - 13%). It was the first time in which SLD fell to fifth place in party results, and the first time in which it polled below the Polish People's Party. Poland Comes First, failed to capture the middle ground between the two major parties, as it was hoping to do, and lost all of its parliamentary seats, achieving only a very modest 2.2% of the vote.

Bloomberg said of the victory for Civic Platform that, as Poland was the only EU country to avoid a recession in 2009, it could continue with its economic initiatives such as consolidating the budget with an expected shortfall and also to avoid austerity measures that many other EU countries have been forced to endure. It also added that the success of the breakaway Palikot movement, coupled with the People Party's reluctance to support some policies, could provide a counterweight to keeping Civic Platform from getting complacent.

== Government formation ==
Following Civic Platform's victory, Tusk said that his party's coalition alliance with the smaller Polish People's Party would continue. Tusk also declared that his ministry would remain unchanged for the remainder of the year, citing the fact that this was the preferable course of action given Poland's presidency of the EU, which continues to the end of the year.
