= Abgarowicz =

Abgarowicz is a Polish surname. Notable people with the surname include:

- Kajetan Abgarowicz (1856–1909), Polish journalist and writer
- Łukasz Abgarowicz (born 1949), Polish politician

== See also ==
- Abgarowicz coat of arms
