= Abgarowicz coat of arms =

Polish coat of arms

Abgarowicz
- Battle cry: none
- Alternative names: Abgarowicz, Sołtan, Wartanowicz, Zachariasiewicz, Zachariaszewicz
- Earliest mention: 1670
- Cities: none
- Families: 5 names Abgarowicz, Sołtan, Wartanowicz, Zachariasiewicz, Zachariaszewicz

Abgarowicz (armen. Աբգարովիչ) is a Polish coat of arms of Wallachian origin. Borne by several families of the Polish gentry during the times of the Polish–Lithuanian Commonwealth, it is most commonly associated with three clans of Armenian origin: the Abgarowicz, Wartanowicz and Zachariasiewicz (or Zachariaszewicz).

== History ==
The earliest bearers of the coat of arms settled in Stanisławów (Ruthenian Voivodeship) in 1670. They received indigenate and their Wallachian coat of arms was accepted. Around 1730 Abgar-Soltan, an Armenian merchant, had two sons. One of them, Krzysztof Abgarowicz adopted the coat of arms' name as his surname. Descendants of the other son, Zachariasz, adopted the surname Zachariaszewicz.

== Blazon ==
Gules, knight Argent mounting a horse Argent.

== Notable bearers ==
Notable bearers of this Coat of Arms include:

- Kajetan Abgarowicz, writer
- Łukasz Abgarowicz, politician

== See also ==
- Armenians in Poland
- Polish heraldry
- Heraldic family
- List of Polish nobility coats of arms

== Bibliography ==
- (in Polish) Seweryn Uruski, Rodzina. Herbarz szlachty polskiej, vol 1, Warsaw, 1904, pp. 1–2.
- Tadeusz Gajl: Herbarz polski od średniowiecza do XX wieku : ponad 4500 herbów szlacheckich 37 tysięcy nazwisk 55 tysięcy rodów. L&L, 2007. ISBN 978-83-60597-10-1.
