= Opinion polling for the 2011 Polish parliamentary election =

Opinion polls in the 2011 Polish parliamentary election were first recorded on 16 May 2010 and culminated before election day on 9 October.

== Graphical summary ==
Graphical summary of opinion polls: Civic Platform Law and Justice Palikot's Movement Polish People's Party Democratic Left Alliance Poland Comes First Self-Defence ~~League of Polish Families~~

== Opinion polls ==
=== 2011 ===
Dates of Polling	Polling Firm/Link	PO	PiS	SLD	PSL	RP	PJN	Others/Undecided	Lead
October 9, 2011	Election results	39.2	29.9	8.2	8.4	10.0	2.2	2.1	9.3
October 7, 2011	Homo Homini	32.1	29.5	12.2	7.8	5.8	-	12.6	2.6
October 4, 2011	GfK Polonia	46	31	9	5	4	-	5	15
October 1–2, 2011	SMG/KRC	32	29	10	5	8	2	14	3
October 2011	CBOS	34	20	9	6	7	1	23	14
September 29, 2011	TNS OBOP	31	22	6	6	7	2	26	9
September 19, 2011	SMG/KRC	35	29	13	5	6	1	11	6
September 16–19, 2011	Estymator	35.1	29.6	13.7	7.1	7.6	4.1	2.8	5.5
September 14–15, 2011	TNS OBOP	40	33	11	7	5	1	3	7
September 12–15, 2011	Estymator	36.3	28.6	14.9	7.1	6.3	4.4	2.4	7.7
September 9, 2011	Homo Homini	31	29	14	7	-	4	15	2
September 1–4, 2011	TNS OBOP	46	29	11	7	3	1	3	17
September 2, 2011	Homo Homini	32	24	12	7	2	3	20	8
September 2011	CBOS	37	20	7	6	2	1	27	17
August 11–16, 2011	GfK Polonia	48	30	11	5	2	1	3	18
August 4–8, 2011	TNS OBOP	45	30	9	7	1	1	7	15
August 2011	CBOS	36	20	8	4	1	0	31	16
July 29, 2011	SMG/KRC	38	28	11	6	1	1	15	10
July 21–25, 2011	GfK Polonia	47	30	11	5	2	1	4	17
July 21–24, 2011	TNS OBOP	41	29	13	8	-	-	9	12
July 15, 2011	Homo Homini	34.5	29.1	11.5	6.4	1.1	1.6	15.8	5.4
July 7–11, 2011	TNS OBOP	45	28	13	6	1	1	6	17
July 2011	CBOS	38	17	9	4	1	0	31	21
June 26, 2011	Homo Homini	37.7	28.5	14.5	6.8	-	3.9	8.6	11.9
June 17, 2011	Homo Homini	38	29	13	6	-	3	11	11
June 2–6, 2011	TNS OBOP	44	25	16	5	1	2	7	19
June 2011	CBOS	34	22	11	5	1	3	24	12
May 21, 2011	Homo Homini	36.6	25.8	14.6	7.2	1.1	2.3	12.4	10.8
May 6–10, 2011	TNS OBOP	44	27	18	4	0	2	5	17
May 2011	CBOS	37	21	12	4	1	1	24	16
April 19–20, 2011	SMG/KRC	38	29	15	3	1	2	12	11
April 14–17, 2011	TNS OBOP	40	26	18	5	2	2	7	14
April 11, 2011	Homo Homini	32.6	30.1	14.9	7.7	-	-	14.7	2.5
April 7–11, 2011	TNS OBOP	39	27	18	6	1	2	7	12
April 1, 2011	Homo Homini	31.0	25.9	15.8	7.0	0.5	3.3	16.5	5.1
April 2011	CBOS	31	23	12	5	1	2	26	8
March 24–28, 2011	GfK Polonia	46	29	15	5	-	-	15	17
March 10–14, 2011	Homo Homini	36.7	24.9	17.0	8.3	2.5	2.8	7.8	11.8
March 11, 2011	Homo Homini	33.1	26.0	17.8	7.4	1.6	3.8	10.3	7.1
March 6, 2011	SMG/KRC	38	27	14	6	1	2	12	11
March 3–6, 2011	TNS OBOP	47	24	15	5	2	3	4	23
March 2011	CBOS	35	18	16	4	1	3	23	17
February 24, 2011	SMG/KRC	36	30	16	5	1	4	8	6
February 24, 2011	Homo Homini	33.2	31.0	14.9	6.4	-	4.7	9.8	2.2
February 23–24, 2011	TNS OBOP	44	26	18	7	-	3	2	18
February 18, 2011	Homo Homini	31	27	16	8	3	5	10	4
February 9–10, 2011	TNS OBOP	43	26	21	4	-	3	3	17
February 3–6, 2011	TNS OBOP	41	26	13	7	2	6	5	15
February 3-9, 2011	CBOS	37	20	12	4	0	4	23	17
January 31, 2011	SMG/KRC	37	29	16	3	-	4	11	8
January 14, 2011	Homo Homini	35.6	26.0	13.6	7.0	-	5.0	12.8	9.6
January 7–10, 2011	TNS OBOP	54	24	11	3	1	3	4	30
January 8, 2011	Homo Homini	37	24	15	8	1	5	10	13
January 5, 2011	SMG/KRC	38	28	13	5	2	3	11	10
January 2011	CBOS	39	20	9	6	1	3	22	19

=== 2010 ===
Dates of Polling	Polling Firm/Link	PO	PiS	SLD	PSL	RP	PJN	Others/Undecided	Lead
December 31, 2010	Homo Homini	33.5	24.4	16.6	8.0	-	4.5	13.0	9.1
December 18–19, 2010	Homo Homini	34.7	24.8	14.8	8.3	-	5.3	12.1	9.9
December 13, 2010	SMG/KRC	40	25	13	6	-	8	8	15
December 2–5, 2010	TNS OBOP	50	22	12	7	1	2	6	28
December 7-14, 2010	CBOS	41	21	11	6	0	1	20	20
November 21, 2010	Local elections	30.9	23.1	15.2	16.3	-	-	14.5	7.8
November 18, 2010	Homo Homini	36.4	21.0	18.2	10.7	5.1	8.6	-	15.4
November 12, 2010	Homo Homini	39.5	16.3	15.1	8.3	5.5	8.2	7.1	23.2
November 5–8, 2010	TNS OBOP	52	23	12	4	1	-	8	29
November 2010	CBOS	40	19	11	6	0	-	24	21
October 21–25, 2010	GfK Polonia	50	35	8	3	1	-	3	15
October 7–10, 2010	GfK Polonia	47	32	11	4	2	-	4	15
October 7–10, 2010	TNS OBOP	46	26	13	4	-	-	11	20
October 2010	CBOS	39	23	9	4	2	-	23	16
September 2–5, 2010	TNS OBOP	47	34	12	4	-	-	3	13
September 2010	CBOS	43	23	13	3	-	-	18	20
August 28, 2010	Homo Homini	42.9	29.8	13.6	5.3	-	-	8.4	13.1
August 5–8, 2010	TNS OBOP	45	29	14	6	-	-	6	16
August 2010	CBOS	41	29	9	3	-	-	18	12
July 8–12, 2010	TNS OBOP	52	31	11	4	-	-	2	21
July 2010	CBOS	40	30	11	3	-	-	16	10
July 4, 2010	Presidential elections - II Round	53.0	47.0	-	-	-	-	-	6.0
June 20, 2010	Presidential elections - I Round	41.5	36.5	13.7	1.8	-	-	6.5	5.0
June 10–15, 2010	TNS OBOP	46	36	9	3	-	-	6	10
June 2010	CBOS	42	28	8	4	-	-	18	14
May 7–10, 2010	TNS OBOP	47	39	6	4	-	-	4	8
May 2010	CBOS	42	28	6	3	-	-	21	14
April 8–14, 2010	TNS OBOP	52	33	7	4	-	-	4	19
April 2010	CBOS	38	25	7	5	-	-	25	13
March 30, 2010	Homo Homini	45.8	24.8	13.9	5.0	-	-	10.5	21
March 18–22, 2010	GfK Polonia	50	24	9	6	-	-	11	26
March 4–7, 2010	TNS OBOP	59	24	8	3	-	-	6	35
March 2010	CBOS	39	23	8	6	-	-	24	16
February 4–7, 2010	TNS OBOP	57	25	7	5	-	-	6	32
February 2010	CBOS	43	19	7	6	-	-	25	24
January 7–10, 2010	TNS OBOP	49	28	12	4	-	-	7	21
January 2010	CBOS	38	24	7	5	-	-	26	14

=== 2009 ===
Dates of Polling	Polling Firm/Link	PO	PiS	SLD	PSL	SRP	LPR	Others/Undecided	Lead
December 5–6, 2009	PBS DGA	46	26	9	7	-	-	12	20
December 3–6, 2009	TNS OBOP	49	27	9	6	1	2	6	22
December 2009	CBOS	36	24	7	4	1	-	28	12
November 5–8, 2009	TNS OBOP	53	24	10	4	1	2	6	29
November 2009	CBOS	38	18	9	5	1	1	28	20
October 2–4, 2009	PBS DGA	48	28	10	6	-	-	8	20
October 1–4, 2009	TNS OBOP	53	20	6	9	1	2	9	33
October 2009	CBOS	41	17	8	6	1	1	26	24
September 3–6, 2009	TNS OBOP	53	26	9	6	1	0	5	27
September 2009	CBOS	41	20	8	5	1	1	24	21
August 6–9, 2009	TNS OBOP	51	26	12	5	1	1	4	25
August 2009	CBOS	40	18	7	6	1	1	27	22
July 17–19, 2009	Gfk Polonia	56	20	11	7	1	1	4	36
July 3–5, 2009	Gfk Polonia	55	18	12	6	-	-	9	37
July 2–5, 2009	TNS OBOP	54	23	11	4	1	1	6	31
July 2009	CBOS	40	20	7	6	1	1	25	20
June 7, 2009	European Parliament election	44.4	27.4	12.3	7.0	1.5	-	7.4	17.0
June 4–7, 2009	TNS OBOP	52	26	8	7	2	1	4	26
June 4, 2009	PBS DGA	56	26	10	6	-	-	2	30
June 2009	CBOS	38	17	6	6	2	2	29	21
May 22–24, 2009	PBS DGA	47	25	10	9	3	-	6	22
May 7–10, 2009	TNS OBOP	50	24	9	4	5	2	6	26
May 2009	CBOS	40	17	8	5	2	2	26	23
April 2–5, 2009	TNS OBOP	58	20	8	5	0	3	6	38
April 2009	CBOS	40	17	9	4	1	1	28	23
March 5–8, 2009	TNS OBOP	54	26	6	4	1	3	6	28
March 2009	CBOS	42	20	8	5	1	1	23	22
February 20–22, 2009	PBS DGA	50	27	8	6	-	5	4	23
February 5–8, 2009	TNS OBOP	52	26	6	6	2	3	5	26
February 2009	CBOS	45	18	5	4	1	3	24	27
January 8–11, 2009	TNS OBOP	52	27	7	4	2	3	5	25
January 2009	CBOS	44	17	7	5	1	1	25	27

=== 2008 ===
Dates of Polling	Polling Firm/Link	PO	PiS	SLD	PSL	SRP	LPR	Others/Undecided	Lead
December 4–8, 2008	TNS OBOP	60	19	6	5	2	3	5	41
December 2008	CBOS	43	18	8	5	2	1	23	27
November 6–10, 2008	TNS OBOP	57	26	8	4	1	1	3	31
November 2008	CBOS	34	18	7	7	1	2	31	16
October 2–6, 2008	TNS OBOP	55	24	6	6	2	1	6	31
October 2008	CBOS	40	20	6	6	1	2	25	20
September 4–8, 2008	TNS OBOP	54	28	6	4	2	1	5	26
September 2008	CBOS	41	19	6	4	1	1	28	22
August 27, 2008	PBS DGA	49	29	5	6	2	3	6	20
August 7–11, 2008	TNS OBOP	55	23	5	6	2	1	8	32
August 2008	CBOS	40	18	7	6	1	2	26	22
July 3–7, 2008	TNS OBOP	55	24	8	3	2	1	7	31
July 2008	CBOS	42	18	6	4	2	2	26	24
June 5–9, 2008	TNS OBOP	55	26	7	5	1	1	5	29
June 2008	CBOS	45	19	6	5	2	1	22	26
May 8–12, 2008	TNS OBOP	54	21	6	6	2	2	9	31
May 2008	CBOS	49	18	5	5	1	1	21	31
April 3–7, 2008	TNS OBOP	55	24	8	6	2	3	2	31
April 2008	CBOS	49	18	5	4	1	2	21	31
March 28–30, 2008	SMG/KRC	50	25	7	6	-	-	12	25
March 6–10, 2008	TNS OBOP	51	26	12	4	2	2	3	25
March 7–9, 2008	PBS	60	23	8	5	1	1	2	37
March 2008	CBOS	49	22	5	4	0	2	18	27
February 7–11, 2008	TNS OBOP	58	24	11	4	0	1	2	34
February 2008	CBOS	48	19	9	5	1	2	16	29
January 10–14, 2008	TNS OBOP	52	25	11	6	3	2	1	27
January 2008	CBOS	53	21	7	6	1	1	11	32

=== 2007 ===
Dates of Polling	Polling Firm/Link	PO	PiS	SLD	PSL	SRP	LPR	Others/Undecided	Lead
December 6–10, 2007	TNS OBOP	59	19	8	7	1	2	4	40
December 1–4, 2007	CBOS	50	22	8	7	2	1	10	28
November 22, 2007	PBS DGA	58	23	8	8	-	-	3	35
November 15, 2007	Gfk Polonia	49	20	7	5	-	-	19	29
November 10–15, 2007	CBOS	47	25	8	8	1	1	9	29
November 8–12, 2007	TNS OBOP	49	28	10	10	1	1	1	29
November 11, 2007	SMG/KRC	53.6	22.1	7.9	8.0	-	-	8.4	35
October 21, 2007	Election results	41.5	32.1	13.2	8.9	1.5	1.3	1.5	9.4
