= Kostrzyn–Słubice Special Economic Zone =

Special economic zone in western Poland

Coordinates: 52.5960°N 14.6399°E

The Kostrzyn–Słubice Special Economic Zone is in the centre of Europe, in western Poland, along the Polish–German border.

The zone's grounds are located in three western Polish provinces: Lubuskie, Zachodniopomorskie and Wielkopolskie, from Karlino, Goleniów and Police in the North, to Lubsko and Bytom Odrzański in the South. It uses the economic and touristic potential of almost the whole west of Poland. Within the zone one can find the biggest cities, industrial and commercial centres of the region: Poznań, Szczecin, Gorzów Wielkopolski and Zielona Góra.

Created in 1997, the Kostrzyn–Słubice SEZ is one of the fastest developing special economic zone in Poland, because of its high rate of tax exemption, nowadays one of the highest in Poland, and its greenfields.

== Subzones ==
=== Lubuskie or Lubusz Voivodeship ===
Kostrzyn nad Odrą, Słubice, Gorzów Wielkopolski, Miedzyrzecz, Rzepin, Zielona Góra, Gubin, Nowa Sól, Bytom Odrzański, Czerwieńsk, Lubsko, Sulęcin, Strzelce Krajeńskie.

=== Zachodniopomorskie or West Pomeranian Voivodeship ===
- Barlinek,
- Goleniów (see: Goleniowski Park Przemysłowy),
- Karlino,
- Police (see: Policki Park Przemysłowy),
- Stargard Szczeciński (see: Stargardzki Park Przemysłowy).

=== Wielkopolskie or Greater Poland Voivodeship ===
Chodzież, Poznań, Swarzędz.

== Location ==
The location of the Kostrzyn–Słubice Special Economic Zone, situated in the very heart of Europe, is right next to the German border and the Zone has passenger and commercial transportation links to the west.

The Zone is situated near main roads including the international E30 (A2), E65 (A3) and E28 motorways and near to the Paris – Berlin – Warsaw – Moscow international railway line. Some of the subzones, the ones located on the Odra and Warta Rivers, have access to seaports in Szczecin, Swinoujscie and Police, as well as the German ports of Berlin and Hamburg. All the subzones are close to airports with passenger and cargo facilities in the cities of Babimost, Goleniów and the German capital, Berlin as well as being close to trade and manufacturing centres that are located in the largest cities of the surrounding regions: Gorzów Wlkp, Zielona Góra, Poznań, Szczecin and Koszalin.

== Investors ==
The dominant types of manufactures of the different investors in the SEZ are chemicals, mechanical engineering, textiles, wood, paper, machinery, construction materials and grocery.

The zone has delivered over 140 permits to conduct a business activity, for example to Volkswagen, Faurecia, Funai Electrics, Arctic Paper, ICT, AB Foods, Podravka, Wendre, Teleskop, BEE, TPV and many more...

There is a strong growth in the economic cooperation with Germany. Other partners of the zone can also be found in France, Italy, Denmark, the Netherlands, the Czech Republic, the UK, Belgium, Spain, the Scandinavian countries, Japan, India, the US and many more.

== Allowances ==
Companies operating a business activity in the Kostrzyn–Słubice Special Economic Zone are entitled to regional support in receiving exemptions from the CIT tax for one of the following categories: investment costs or the creation of new work places.

In the subzones located in the Lubuskie Voivodeship, the companies deciding to conduct a business activity in the Kostrzyn–Słubice Special Economic Zone, benefit from CIT tax exemption of their initial investment costs or of 2 years of employment costs, after receiving from the SEZ a permit to conduct a business activity, which amounts to 70% of exemption for small companies, medium-sized companies benefit from 60% of exemption and large companies benefit from 50% of exemption.

In the subzones located in the Wielkopolskie and Zachodniopomorskie Voivodeship, these allowances are decreased by 10%, this amounts to 60% for small companies, 50% for medium-sized companies and 40% for large companies.
