= Goleniów Industrial Park =

Coordinates: 53.541°N 14.797°E

Goleniów Industrial Park (Polish: Goleniowski Park Przemysłowy) is an industrial park in Goleniów, a district town in north-west Poland (West Pomeranian Voivodeship). The total area is about 400 ha. In the area: ship and Harbour (Police) and Harbour (Szczecin and Świnoujście)), road and rail transport, Szczecin-Goleniów "Solidarność" Airport (Goleniów) and a centre of Goleniów.

Goleniowski Park Przemysłowy is a part of Kostrzyn–Slubice Special Economic Zone,

== List of investors ==
- Abena Polska
- Akala Faraone
- Andaro International Transport
- Asia
- Baltic Spinning
- Benders
- Best Advice and Invest
- Chemical Alliance Polska
- Dancook
- DPL Transport Spedition
- Eurogranit – Adamus
- Faymonville Polska
- GDR
- Gryfitlab
- Glancos Poland
- FHU Mul.ti Projekt
- HG Poland
- Index – Nieruchomości H. J. M. Skrzyniarz
- InCom
- PPH Integropol
- Jachink PT
- Kim Hurt
- LM Wind Power
- Lucky Union Foods
- Lębork Energia
- Frigomar
- MPT Stanro
- Nafa Polska
- Norpol
- Praxisprint
- PRD Poldróg Nowogard
- Prologis Poland
- PC Factory
- Polglass
- Rasch
- Reinertsen
- SIA
- SPRI Mazur
- Technologie Tworzyw Sztucznych
- Thermoplastic Winding Systems
- TM Toys
- Weber Polska
- VTS Hermanus Verdijk
