= Kajetan Abgarowicz =

Polish journalist and author (1856–1909)

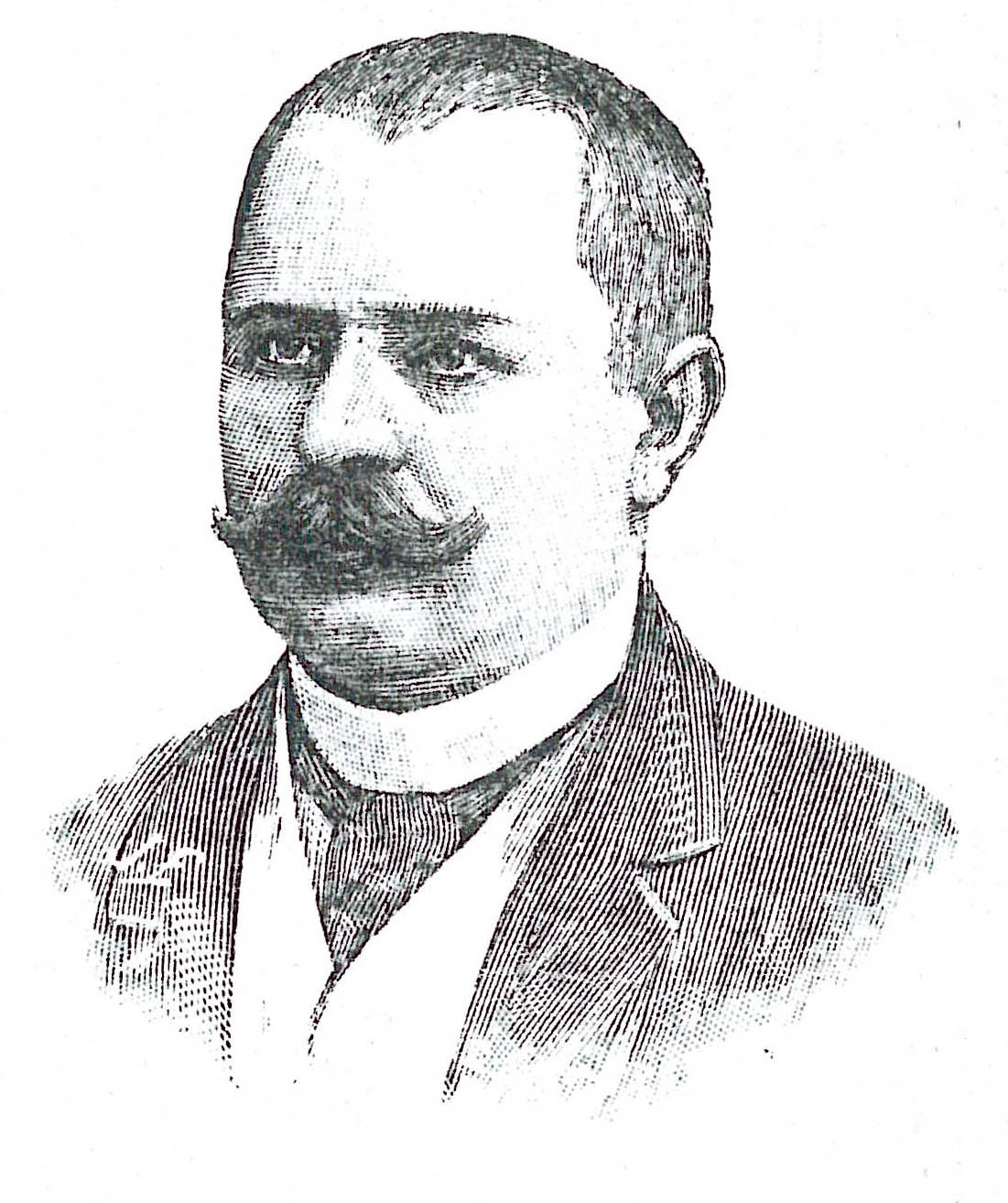
- Abgar Sołtan
- Born: Kajetan Abgarowicz; 7 August 1856; Czerniów, Kingdom of Galicia and Lodomeria
- Died: 27 July 1909 (aged 52); Truskavets, Austria-Hungary
- Occupations: journalist author
- Writing career
- Pen name: Kajetan Abgar-Soltan; Soltan Abgar
- Years active: 1889–1909
- Genres: popular fiction romance adventure

Kajetan Abgarowicz (pseudonyms: Kajetan Abgar-Soltan, and Soltan Abgar; Armenian: Կաետան Աբգարովիչ); 7 August 1856 – 27 July 1909) was a Polish journalist, novelist and short story writer of Armenian descent.

== Life ==
Abgarowicz was born on 7 August 1856 in Czerniów, Kingdom of Galicia and Lodomeria. Born into a family of landowners, his parents were Franciszek and Salomea née Przysiecka. Abgarowicz attended schools in Stanisławów and Lwów (Lviv), Ukraine. He made his debut in the press as a novelist in 1889. He was co-founder in 1901 of the Lviv newspaper Przedświt, and also ran the literary section. He collaborated with other magazines of Lviv, Kraków and Warsaw, such as Słowo Polskie, Gazeta Lwowska (1894), Czas, Nowa Reforma and Tygodnik Illustrowany.

A popular humourist, Abgarowicz wrote in the mainstream genres of Polish popular fiction, romance, and adventure. Many of his short stories and novels were published, most of which centred on the nobility, especially from the Podolia region, featuring young squires leading an active social life. Abgarowicz was also interested in the life of Rusyns and contributed to the popularity of Hutsuls culture in Poland. While his novels, such as Klub nietoperzy (two volumes, the first of which was published in 1892), Polubowna ugoda (1894), and Z wiejskiego dworu (1895), were characterized as being weak, his collections of short stories and sketches, such as Z carskiej imperii (1892), Rusini (1893) and Widziane i odczute (1904), did not receive the same criticism.

He died on 27 July 1909 in Truskawiec.

== Partial works ==
- Klub nietoperzy (1892)
- Józef Jerzy Hordyński-Fed'kowicz (1892)
- Z carskiej imperii (1892)
- Rusini (1893)
- Nie ma metryki (1894)
- Zawiedziona nadzieja (1894)
- Polubowna ugoda (1894)
- Z wiejskiego dworu (1895)
- Dobra nauczka (1896)
- Ilko Szwabiuk (1896)
- Panna Siekierczanka (1897)
- Nea
- Rywale (1904)
- Widziane i odczute (1904)
- Polubowna ugoda (1909)
- Pornografja: głosy polskie w najważniejszej (1909)
- Pierścień Królowej Rumuńskiej (n.d.)

== See also ==
- Abgarowicz coat of arms
- List of humorists
