= Stargard Industrial Park =

Industrial park

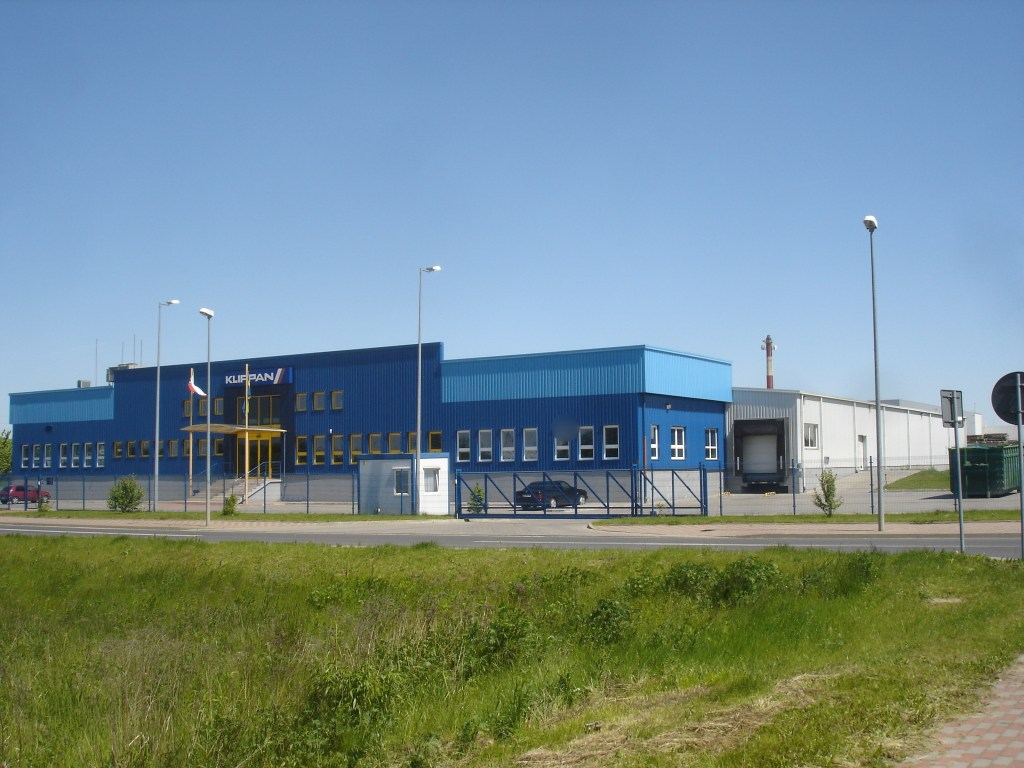

Stargard Industrial Park (Polish: Stargardzki Park Przemysłowy) is an industrial park in Stargard, a district town in north-west Poland (West Pomeranian Voivodeship). The total area is about 150 ha. In the area: harbours (Police Harbour (Police) and Szczecin-Świnoujście Harbour (Szczecin and Świnoujście)), road and rail transport, Szczecin-Goleniów "Solidarność" Airport (Goleniów) and a centre of Stargard.
