= Stanisław Iwan =

Polish business executive and politician

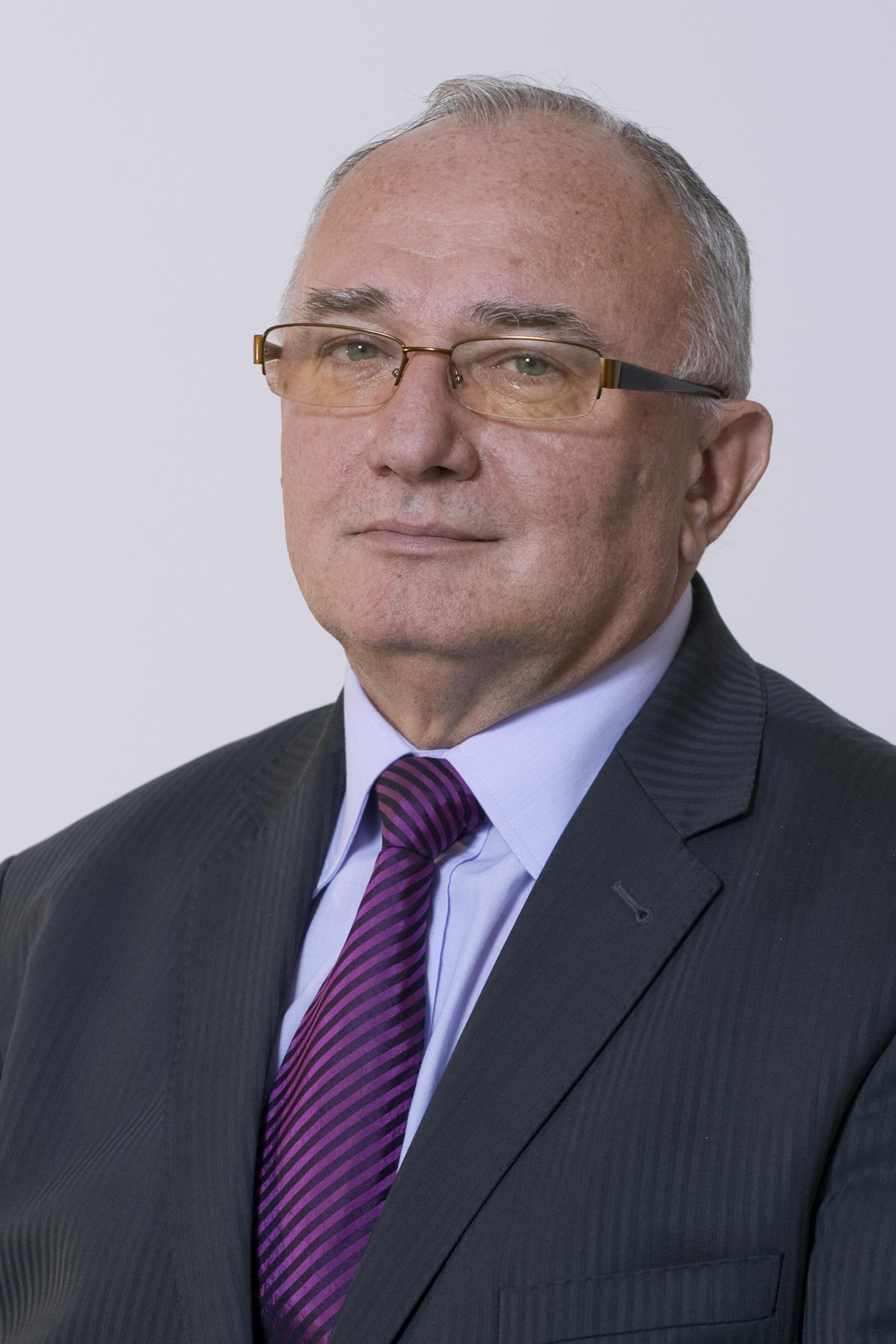

Vice President of the Kostrzyn–Słubice Special Economic Zone
- Incumbent
- Assumed office 2016

Personal details
- Born: 1946 (age 79–80)

Stanisław Antoni Iwan (1949–present) is a Polish business executive and former politician who is the vice president of the Kostrzyn–Słubice Special Economic Zone. He served as voivode of the Lubusz Voivodeship from 2000 to 2001 and in the Polish Senate from 2007 to 2015.
