= Tadeusz Kopeć =

Polish politician (born 1960)

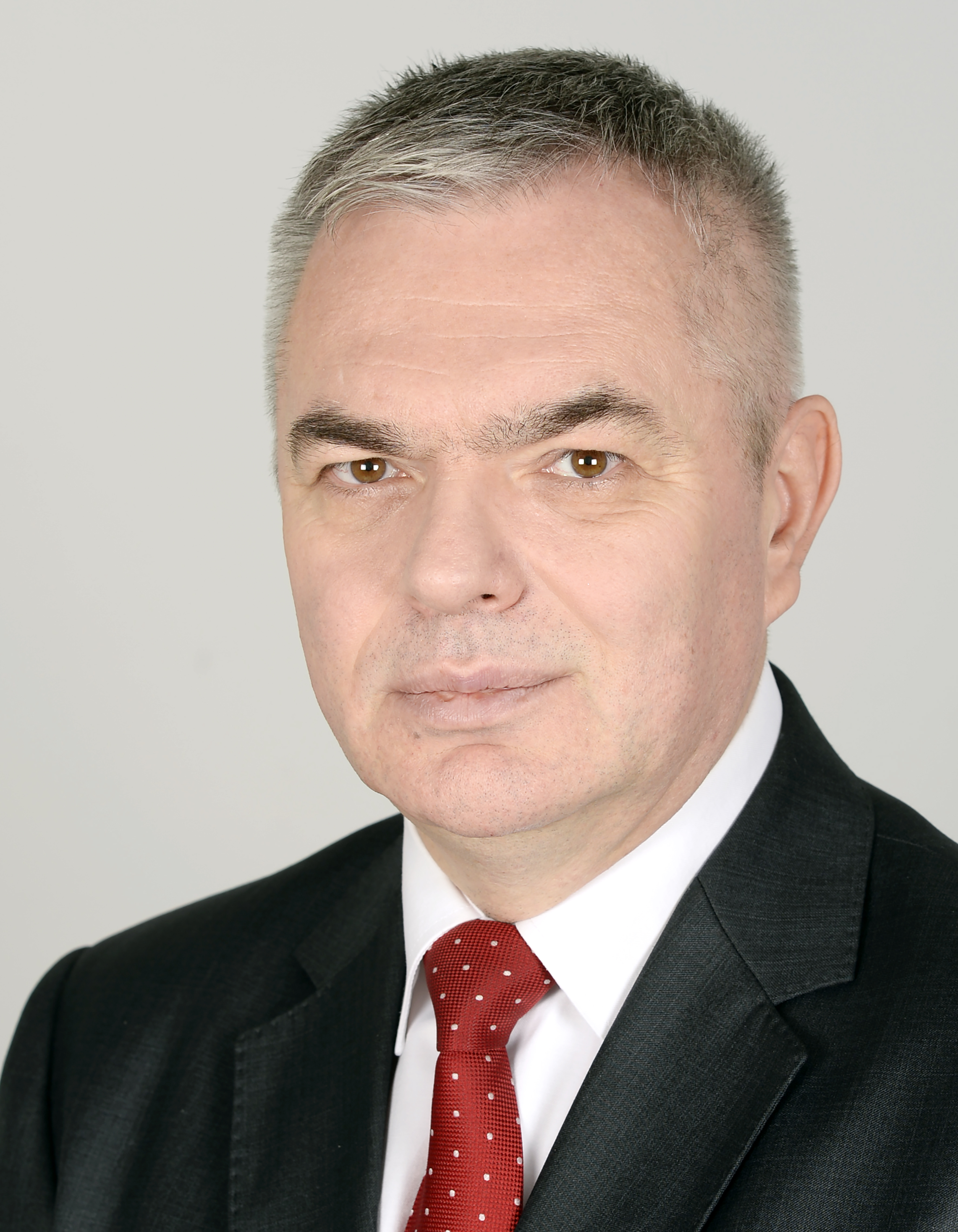

member of Sejm 2005-2007
- In office 25 September 2005 – ?

Personal details
- Born: 1960 (age 65–66)
- Party: Agreement, Civic Platform (former)

Tadeusz Wiktor Kopeć (born 24 August 1960 in Pierściec, Cieszyn Silesia) is a Polish politician. He was elected to the Sejm on 25 September 2005, getting 6,206 votes in 27 Bielsko-Biała district as a candidate from the Civic Platform list.

In 2011 he won his race for senator in the number 79 Senate constituency, with 48,948 votes. On 22 May 2015 he resigned from membership in the Civic Platform and associated himself with Poland Together.

In the same year he won reelection to the Senate (this time starting from the list of Law and Justice) with 58,482 votes. In 2019 he was again reelected, with 78,655 votes.

== See also ==
- Members of Polish Sejm 2005-2007
