= Grzegorz Czelej =

Polish politician (born 1964)

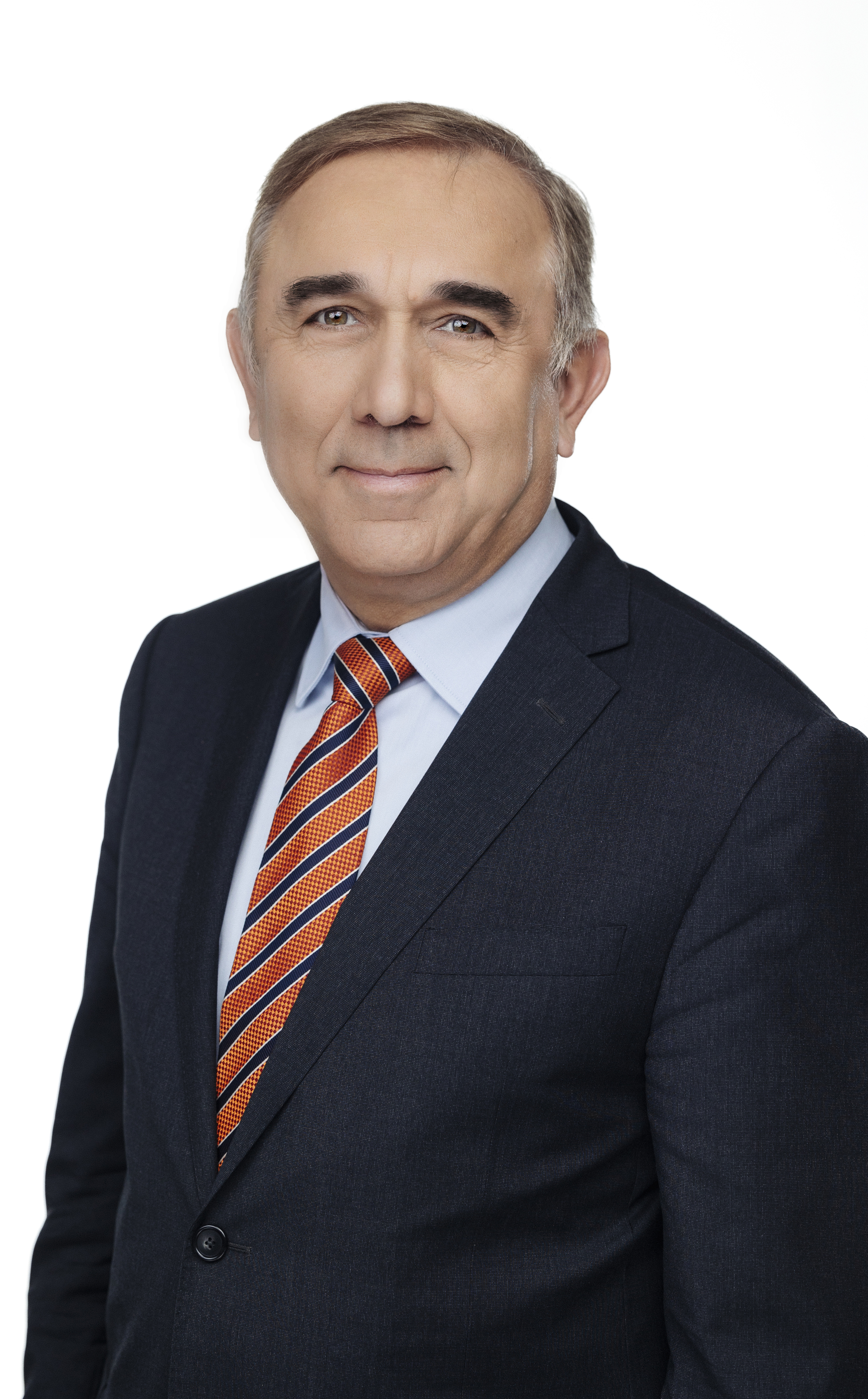
Grzegorz Czelej (2023)

Grzegorz Czelej (born 14 October 1964) is a Polish politician. He was elected to the Senate of Poland (10th term) representing the constituency of Lublin. He was also elected to the 11th term.
