= Stanisław Gorczyca =

Polish politician (born 1958)

Stanisław Andrzej Gorczyca
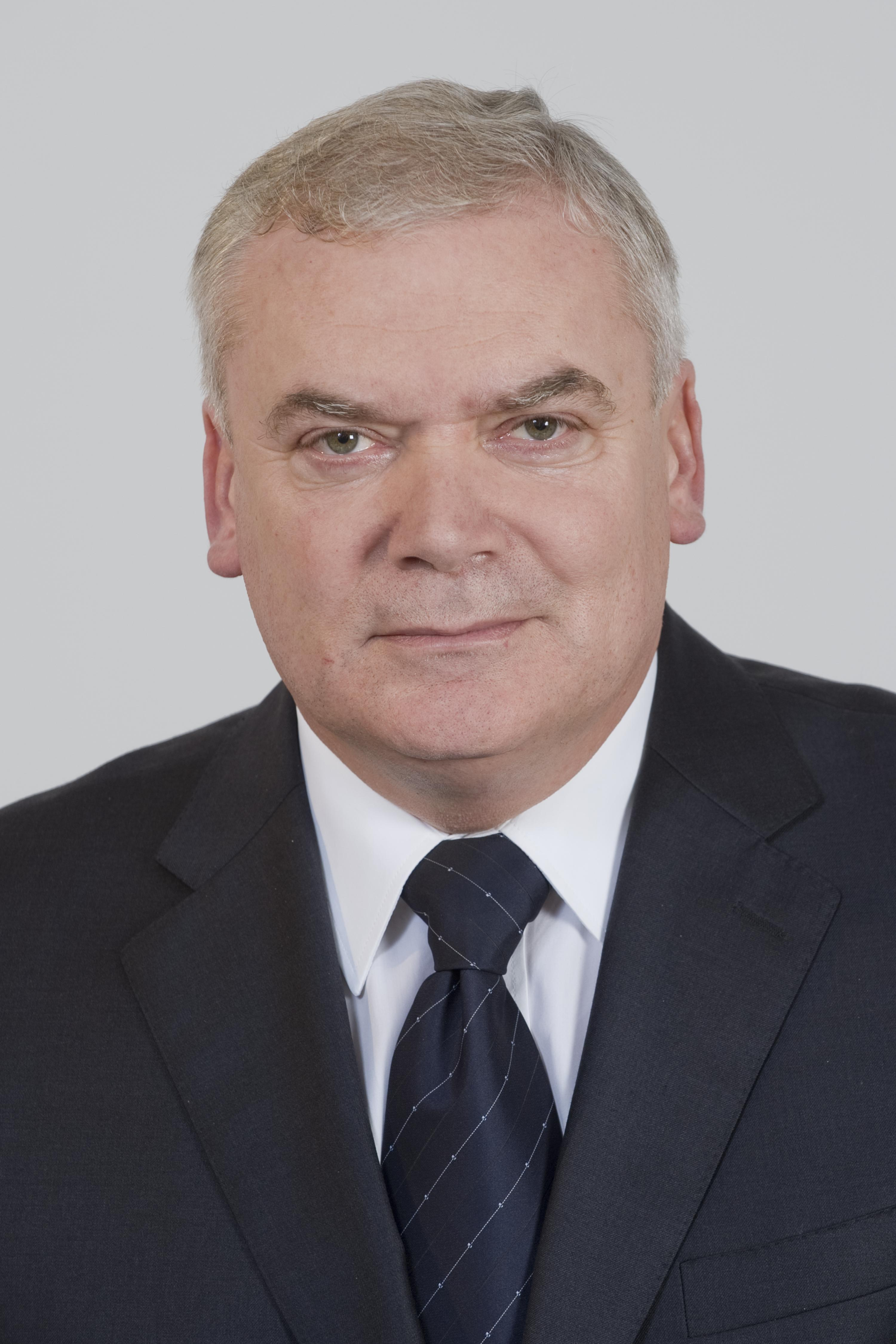

Member of Sejm
- In office 19 October 2001 – 4 November 2007

Member of Senate
- In office 5 November 2007 – 11 November 2015

Member of Senate
- Incumbent
- Assumed office 13 November 2023

Personal details
- Born: 27 July 1958 (age 67)
- Party: Civic Platform

Stanisław Andrzej Gorczyca (born 27 July 1958 in Miłomłyn) is a Polish politician. He was elected to Sejm on 25 September 2005, getting 5822 votes in 34 Elbląg district as a candidate from the Civic Platform list.

He was also a member of Sejm 2001–2005.

== See also ==
- Members of Polish Sejm 2005–2007
