= Ryszard Knosala =

Polish politician

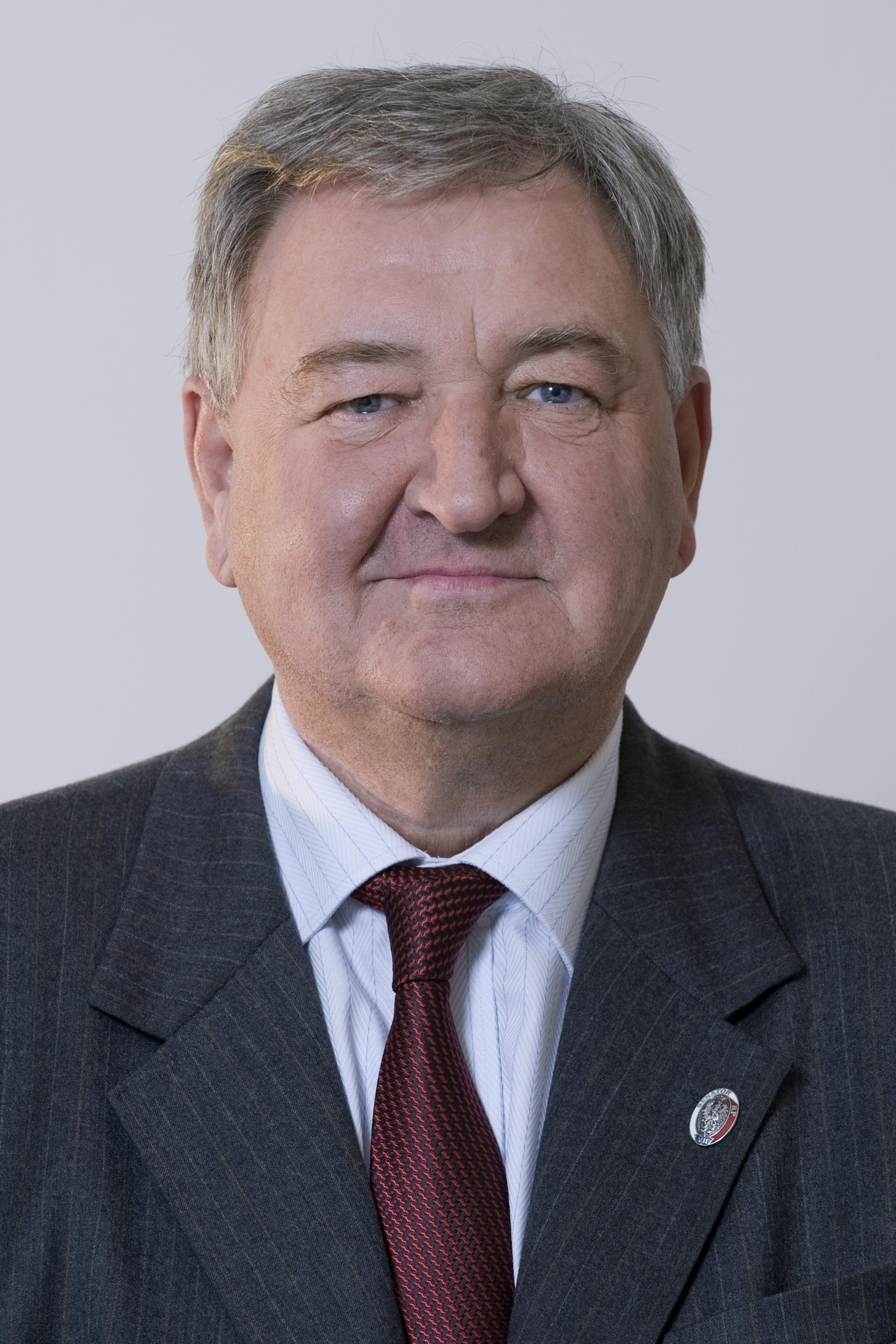

Member of the Senate
- Incumbent
- Assumed office 5 November 2007
- Constituency: 20 – Opole

Member of the Sejm
- In office 25 September 2005 – 21 October 2007
- Constituency: 21 – Opole

Personal details
- Born: 8 August 1949 (age 76) Opole, Poland
- Party: Civic Platform

Ryszard Antoni Knosala (born 8 August 1949 in Opole) is a Polish engineer, professor of technical sciences and politician. He was the first Rector of the University of Applied Sciences in Nysa, starting from 5 October 2001. Knosala was elected to the Sejm on 25 September 2005, getting 9087 votes in 21 Opole district as a candidate from the Civic Platform list.

Knosala is the Chairman of Polish Society of Production Management.

== Awards and recognition ==
- Honorary degree of doctor honoris causa of the Czestochowa University of Technology, 2019.
- Order of the Rebirth of Poland, 2000.
- Gold Cross of Merit, 1993.

== Publications ==
Knosala published his works, as the only author or together with other scientists, at such renowned publishing houses as Polish Economic Publishing House (PWE), Elsevier or Springer. Selected publications include:

- Management Engineering. Production digitization - series of PWE books (in Polish) with 3 editions of research news: #1 (2019), #2 (2020), #3 (2021).
- Verification of the Method for Assessing Productivity, Taking into Account Logistical Processes in Manufacturing Companies, Springer, 2018.
- Production Engineering. Knowledge Compendium (in Polish), PWE, 2017.
- Evaluation of design alternatives in mechanical engineering, Elsevier, 1992.

== See also ==
- Members of Polish Sejm 2005-2007
