= Alicja Chybicka =

Polish politician (born 1951)

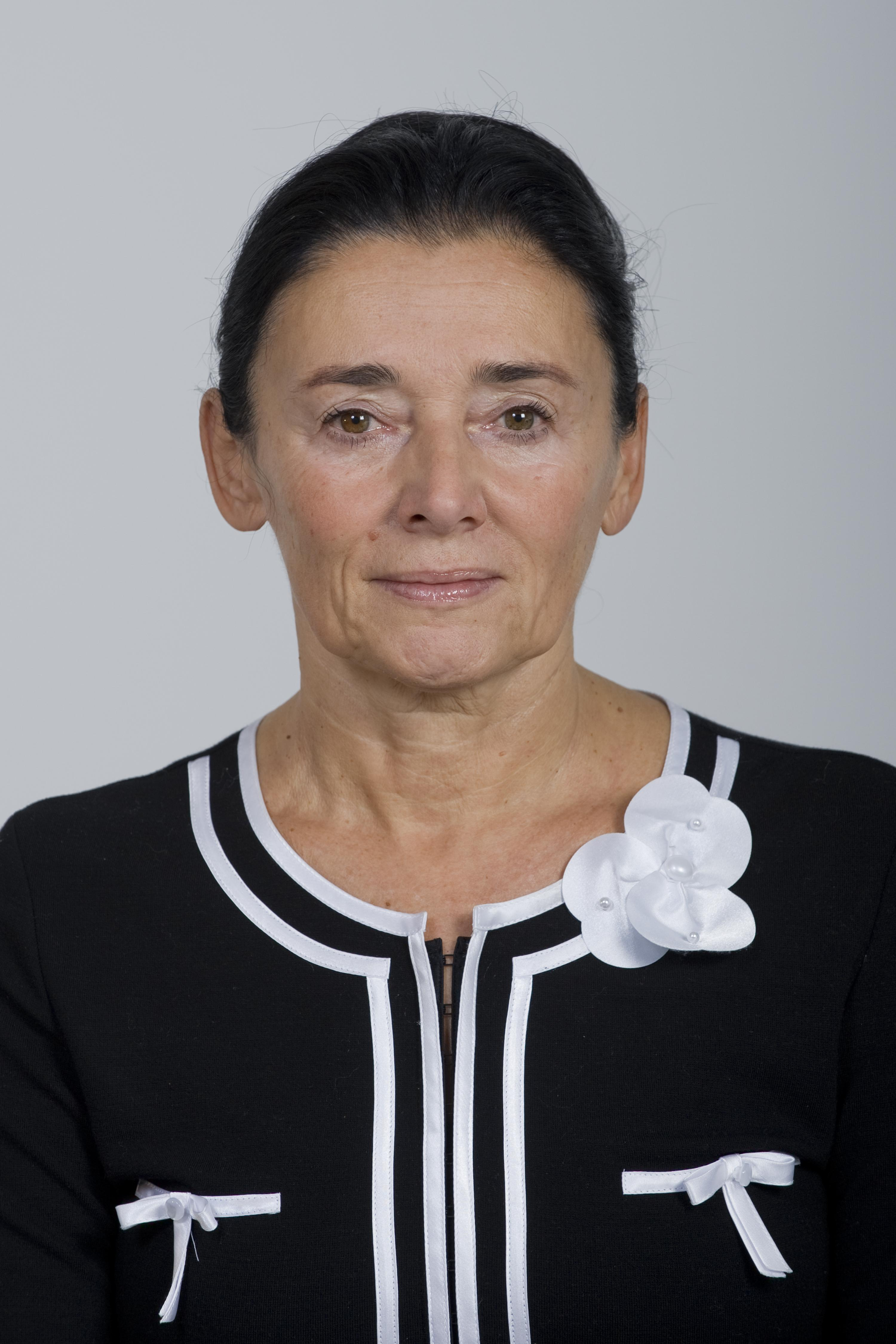

Member of the Sejm, VIII and X terms
- Incumbent
- Assumed office 12 November 2023
- In office 11 November 2015 – 12 November 2019

Member of the Senate, VIII and X terms
- In office 12 November 2019 – 12 November 2023
- In office 8 November 2011 – 11 November 2015

Personal details
- Born: 10 May 1951 (age 74)

Alicja Paulina Chybicka (born 10 May 1951) is a Polish politician. She was elected to the Senate of Poland (10th term) representing the constituency of Wrocław.

== Honours ==
In 2001, she was awarded the Gold Cross of Merit.
