= Wojciech Skurkiewicz =

Polish politician (born 1969)

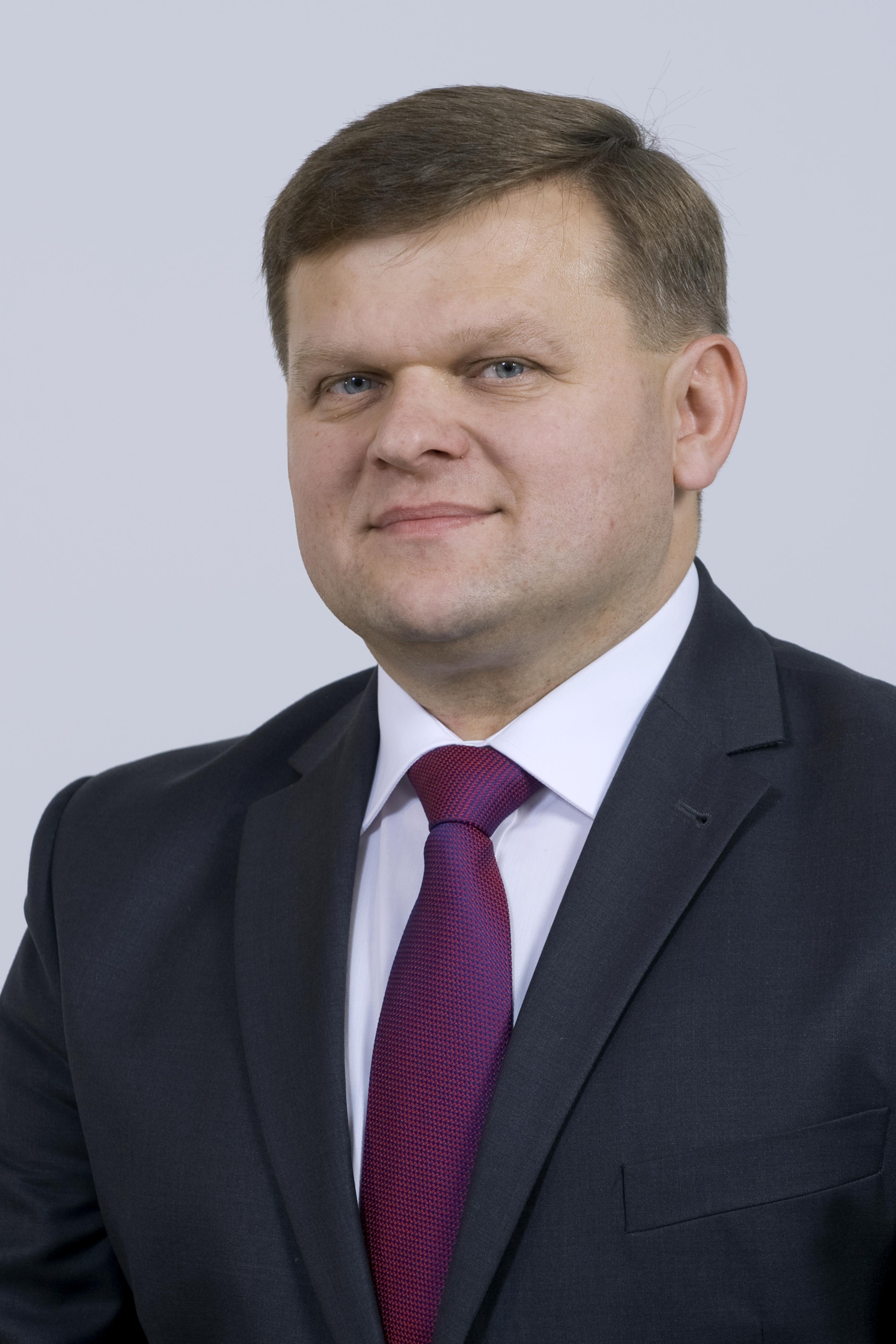
Wojciech Skurkiewicz

Wojciech Skurkiewicz (born 5 December 1969) is a Polish politician. He was elected to the Senate of Poland (10th term) representing the constituency of Radom.
