= Krzysztof Słoń =

Polish politician (born 1964)

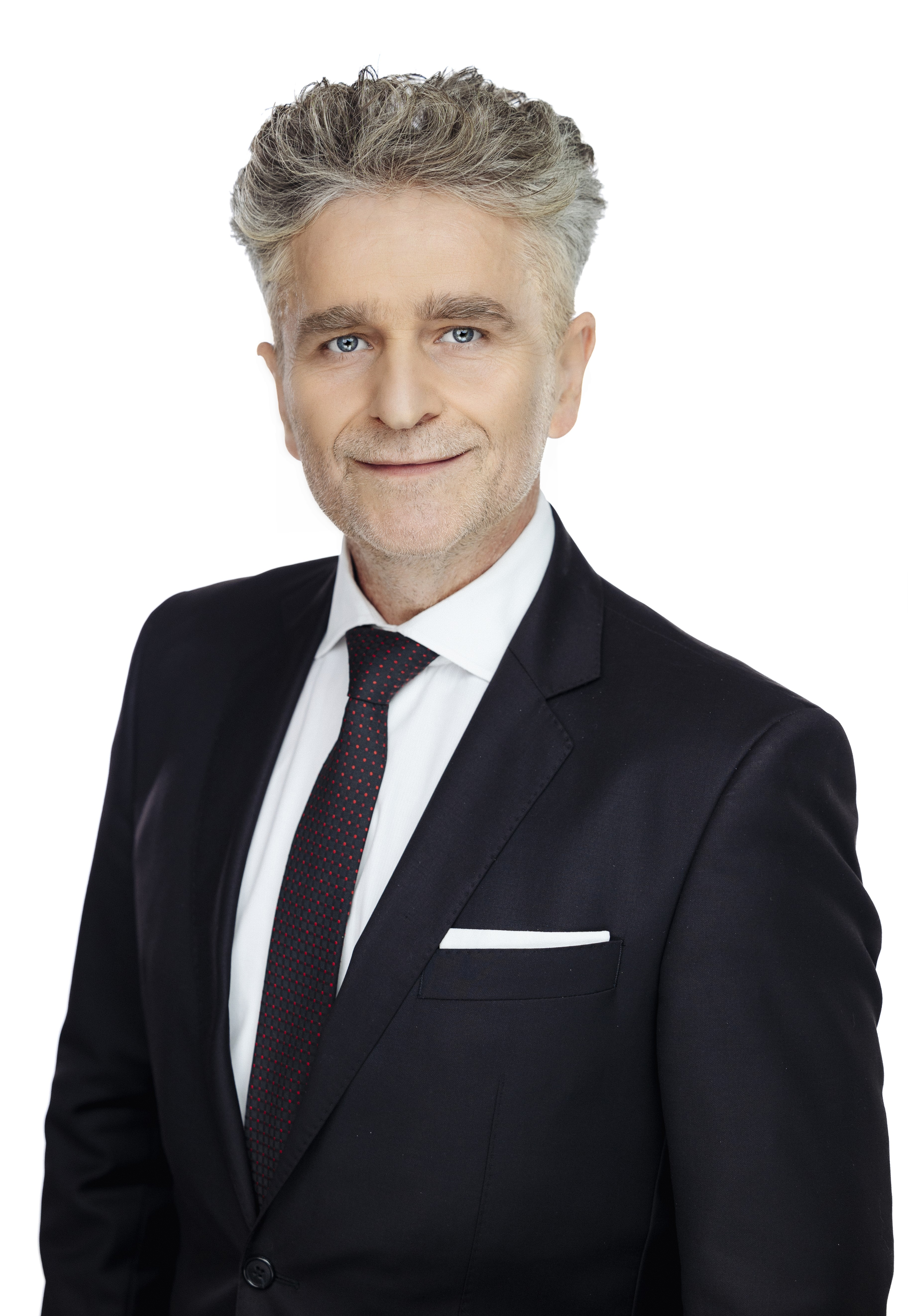

Member of the Senate of Poland

Personal details
- Born: 12 October 1964 (age 61)

Krzysztof Marek Słoń (born 12 October 1964) is a Polish politician. He was elected to the Senate of Poland (10th term) representing the constituency of Kielce. He was also elected to the 8th term (2011–2015) and 9th term (2015–2019) of the Senate of Poland. He was also elected to the 11th term.
