= Rafał Muchacki =

Polish politician

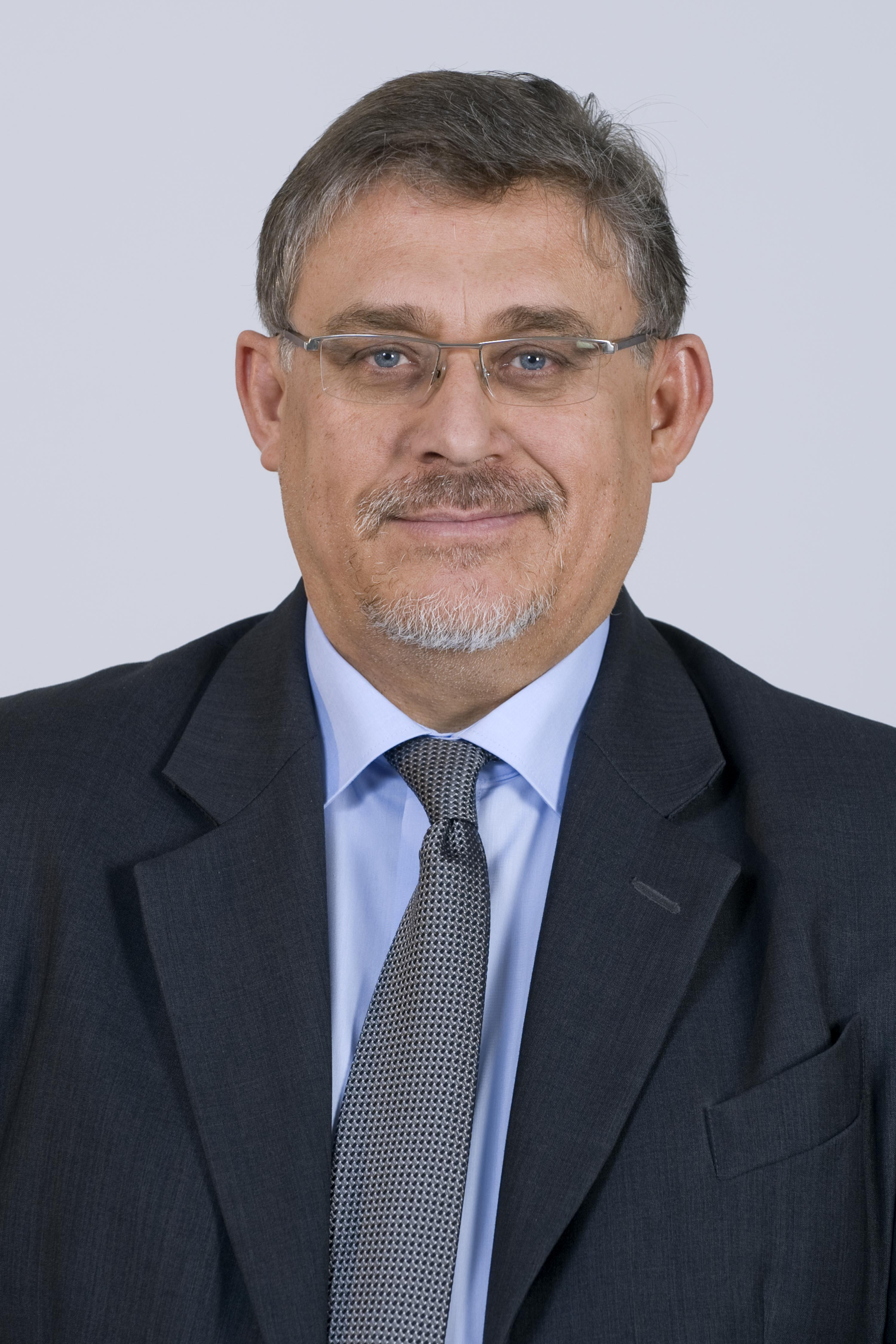

member of Sejm 2005-2007
- In office 25 September 2005 – 2007

Personal details
- Born: 1955 (age 70–71)
- Party: Civic Platform

Rafał Klemens Muchacki (born 3 February 1955 in Bielsko-Biała) is a Polish politician. He was elected to the Sejm on 25 September 2005, getting 12,015 votes in 27 Bielsko-Biała district as a candidate from the Civic Platform list.

== See also ==
- Members of Polish Sejm 2005-2007
