= Maciej Grubski =

Polish politician (1968–2020)

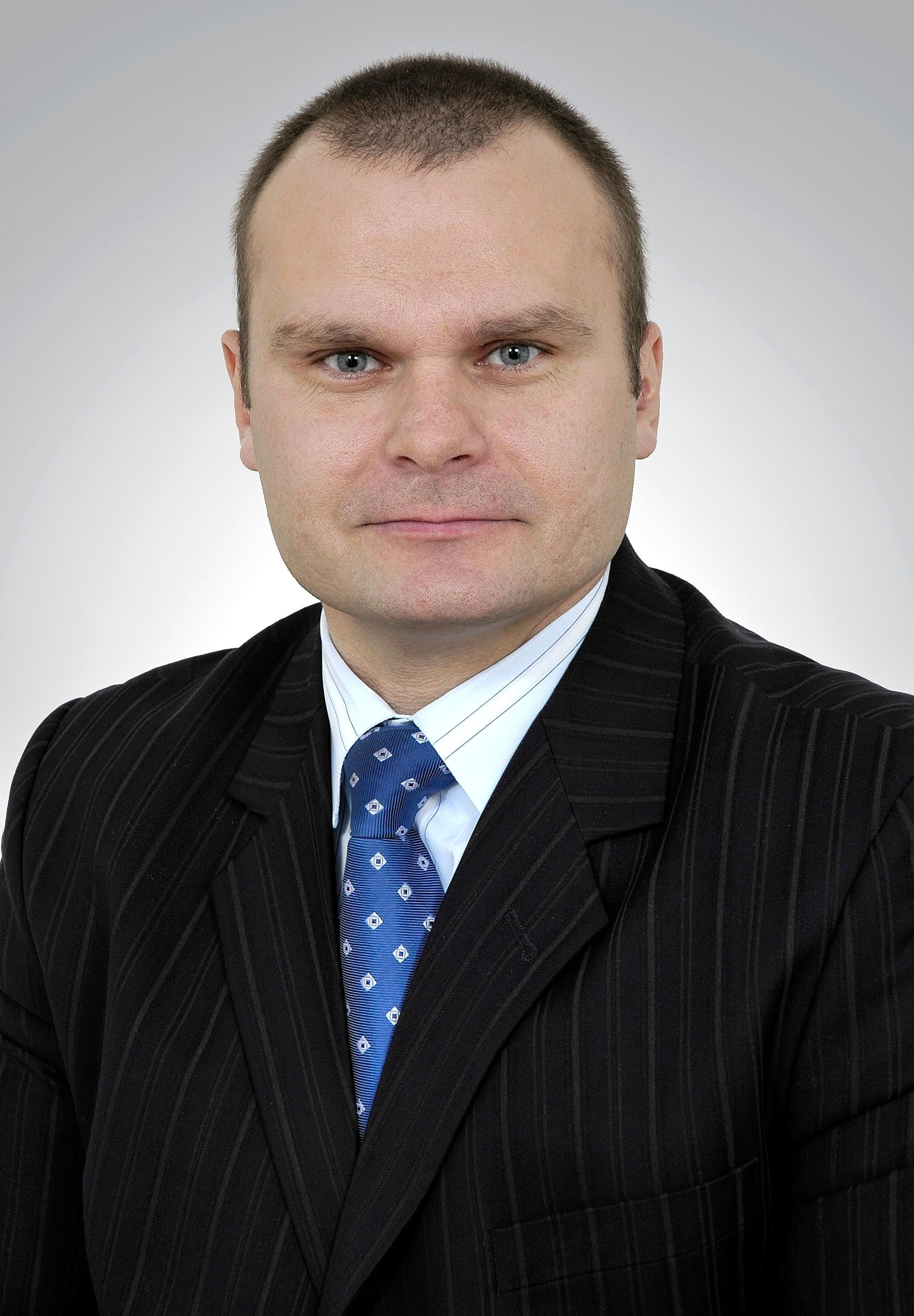
- Born: 20 August 1968; Łódź, Poland
- Died: 17 December 2020 (aged 52); Łódź, Poland
- Occupation: Politician
- Political party: Democratic Union (1993–94); Freedom Union (1994–99); Civic Platform (2006–2018)

Maciej Tomasz Grubski (20 August 1968 – 17 December 2020) was a Polish politician from the Civic Platform.

== Biography ==
He served as member of the Senate of Poland from 2007 to 2019.

Grubski died of COVID-19 during the COVID-19 pandemic in Poland, at age 52.
