= Beata Gosiewska =

Polish politician (born 1971)

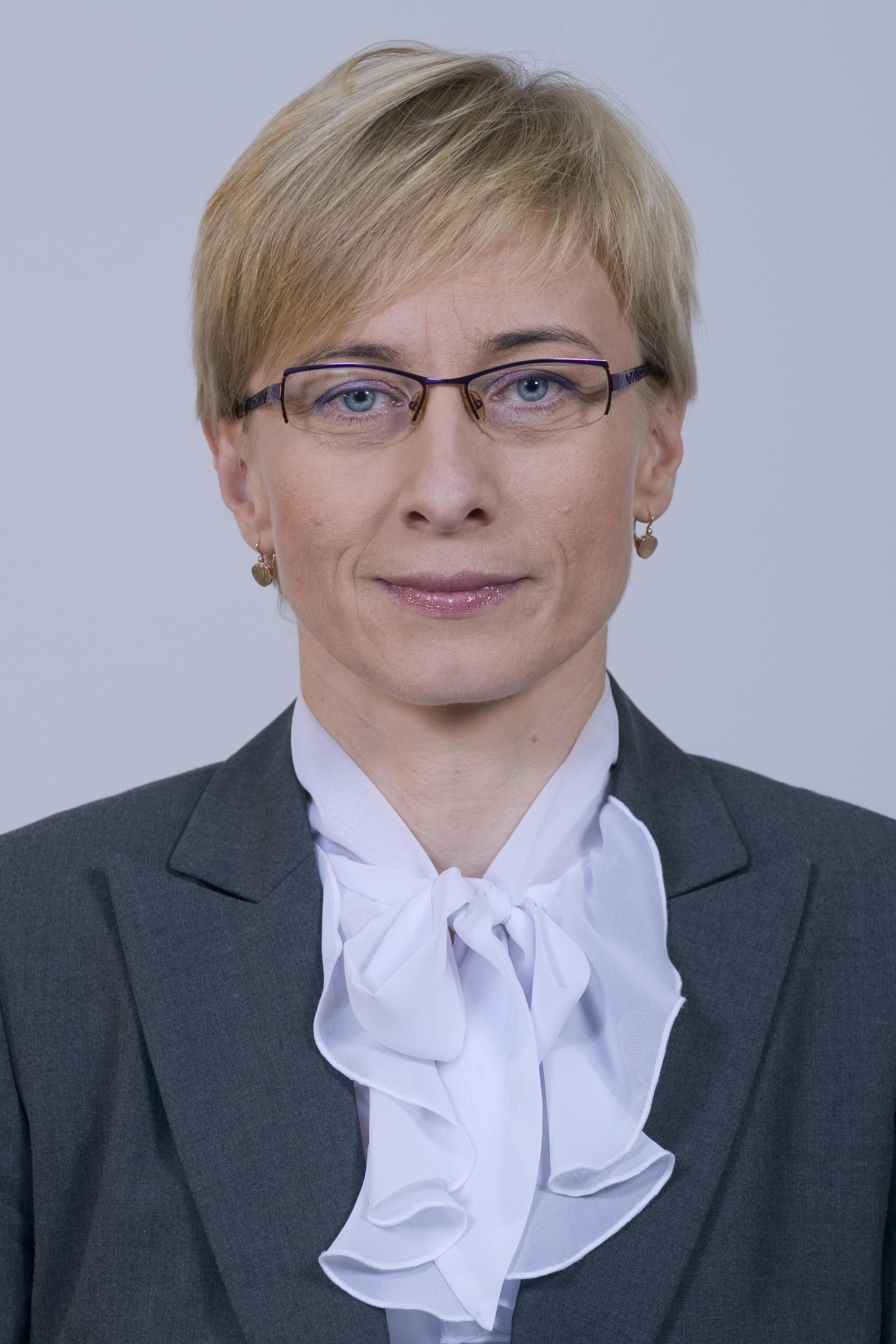
- Born: 6 March 1971 (age 55); Wysokie Mazowieckie, Podlaskie, Poland
- Occupation: Politician
- Political party: Law and Justice
- Spouse: Przemysław Gosiewski (died 2010)

Beata Barbara Gosiewska (née Jabłońska; born 6 March 1971) is a Polish politician from Law and Justice. She was a member of the Senate of Poland from 2011 to 2014. She was elected in 2014 as a Member of the European Parliament (MEP) for European Conservatives and Reformists.

She was the second wife of late Polish politician Przemysław Gosiewski who died in Smolensk air disaster in April 2010.
