= Andrzej Owczarek =

Polish politician (1950–2020)

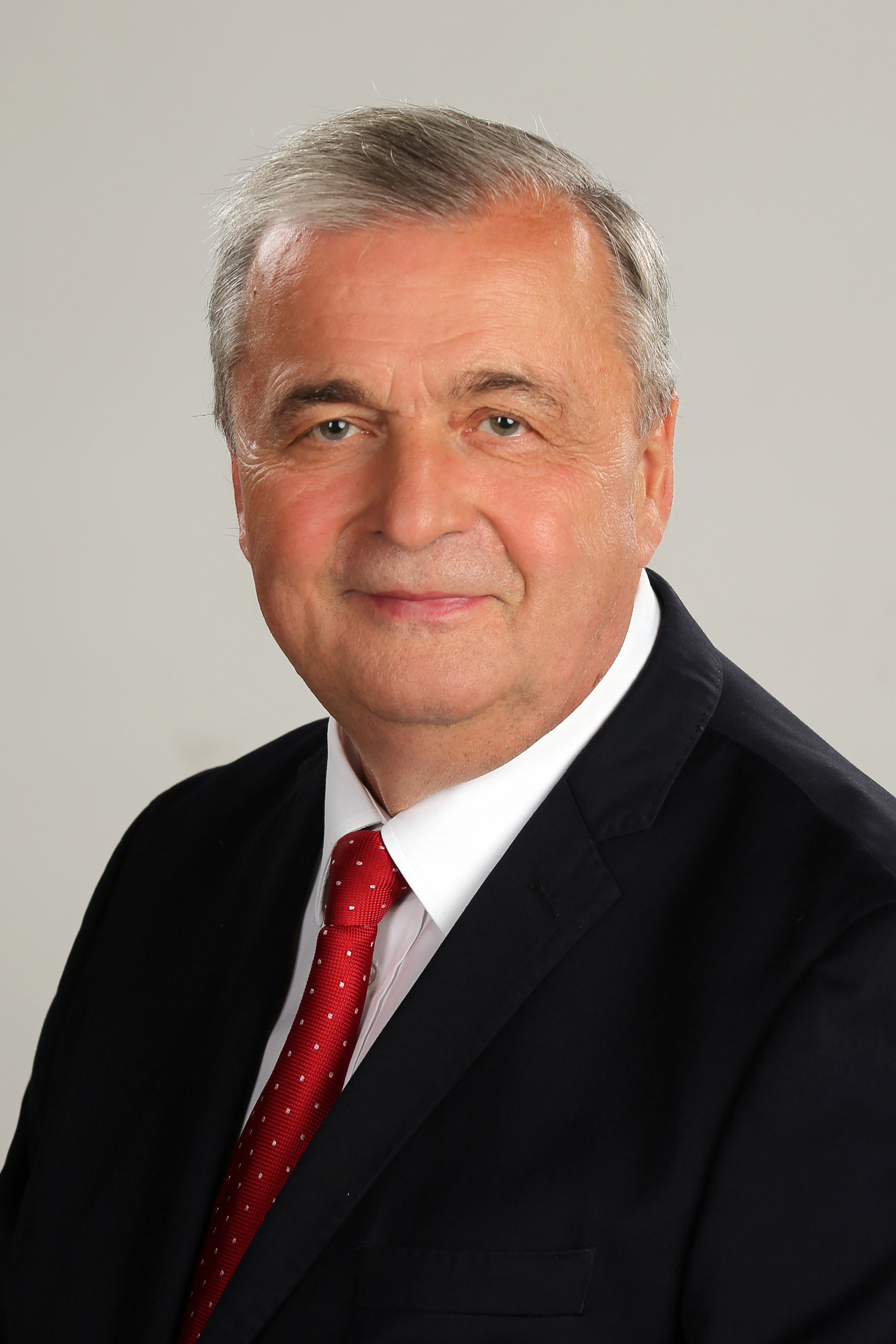
- Andrzej Owczarek (2015)
- Born: 21 June 1950; Pabianice, Poland
- Died: 6 November 2020 (aged 70); Łódź, Poland
- Occupation: Polish politician

Andrzej Owczarek (21 June 1950 – 6 November 2020) was a Polish politician.

== Biography ==
He served as a Senator from 2005–2015 for the Civic Platform.

Owczarek died of COVID-19 in Łódź, Poland, on 6 November 2020, at the age of 70.
