= Łukasz Abgarowicz =

Polish politician (born 1949)

Łukasz Maria Abgarowicz
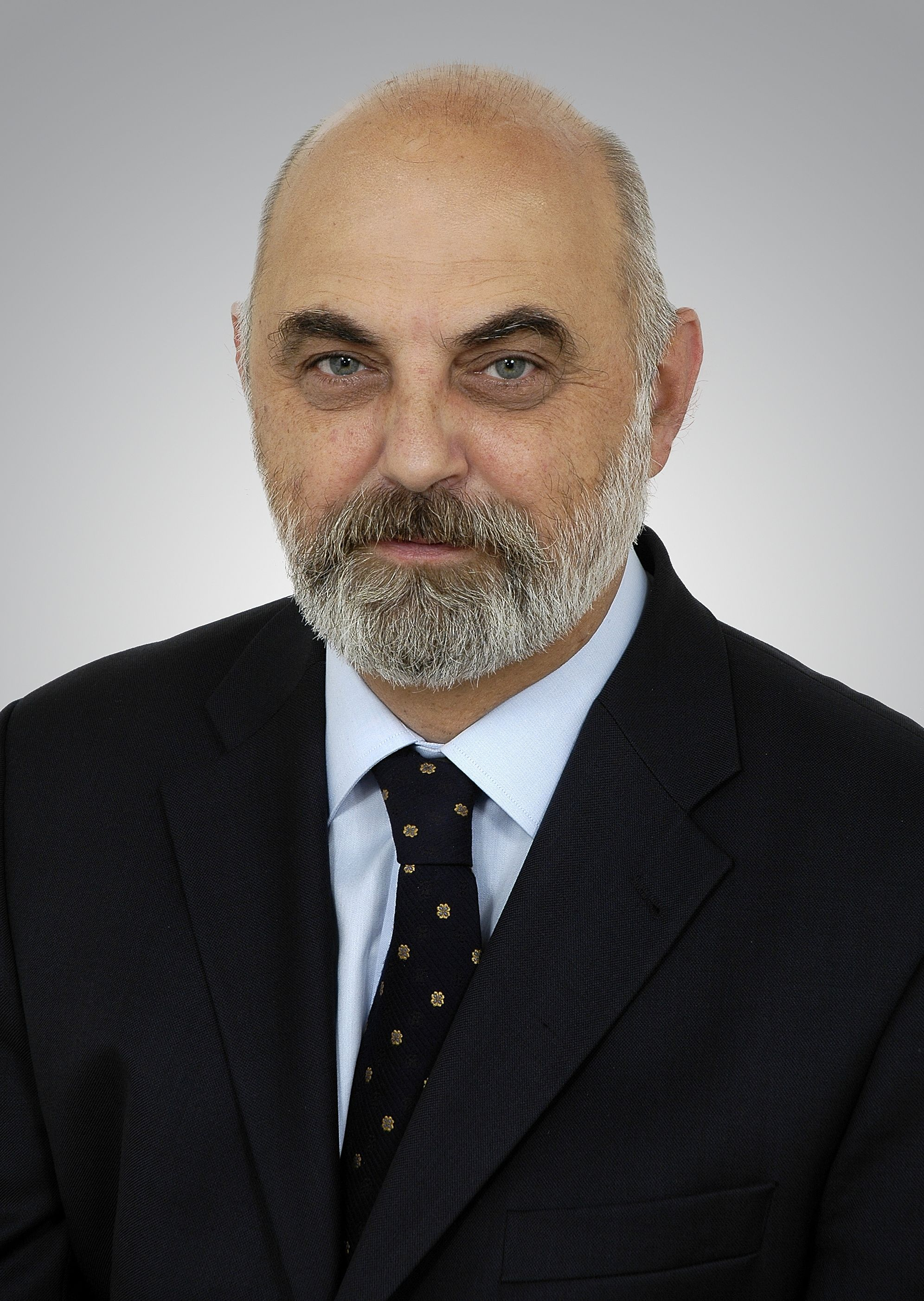

Member of Sejm
- In office 19 October 2001 – 4 November 2007

Member of Senate
- In office 5 November 2007 – 11 November 2015

Personal details
- Born: 18 October 1949 (age 76) Bydgoszcz, Poland
- Party: Civic Platform

Łukasz Maria Abgarowicz [ˈwukaʂ abɡaˈrɔvit͡ʂ] (born 18 October 1949 in Bydgoszcz) is a Polish politician.

He graduated from the Veterinary Technical Faculty of the Warsaw University of Life Sciences in 1972 and worked as a race horse trainer at Warsaw State Horse Race Tracks between 1972 and 1988. From 1988 to 1990, he was the corporate development representative of the board of directors of the Inar Company in Warsaw and served as chairman of the board of directors of the Warnet Company (until 1999). Between 1999 and 2002 he was the chairman of the supervisory board of Dom Development Company S.A.

He was a member of the Sejm from 2001 to 2005 representing the 16th Płock district, from the Civic Platform list. He has been a Senator since 2007 and is a member of the national council of the Civic Platform Party of Poland.

He has five children.

== See also ==
- Members of Polish Sejm 2005-2007
