= Senate by-elections in Poland =

In Poland, in case of a premature expiration of a senatorial term, by-elections are held to fill the vacancy. Several by-elections have been held in Polish history following the Senate's reestablishment following the fall of Communism in Poland.

== Electoral system ==
The Polish Senate is composed of one hundred Senators, all elected in single-seat constituencies, in contrast to several-seat electoral districts that are used to elect the Sejm. Unlike the Sejm, for which there are no by-elections, Senate by-elections are held if a Senator's term expires prematurely. A Senate term may expire prematurely in the case of:

- death of the Senator
- loss of electability privilege or not possessing it at election day
- revocation of mandate by State Tribunal
- resignation from the mandate
- occupation of a position which is incompatible with the office of Senator
- assumption of the office of President of Poland, member of the European Parliament or any other office incompatible with the office of Senator

== List of by-elections ==
=== 1st term Senate (1989–1991) ===
Even during the first term of the newly-reestablished Senate, the possibility of a Senatorial term prematurely expiring was taken into consideration. Article 16 of the electoral ordinance to the Senate declared that by-elections must be held in the event of a Senatorial term ending early.

==== Piotrków Constituency ====
By-elections were held in the Piotrków Voivodeship on 8 October 1989 to fill a vacancy left by the premature expiration of Grzegorz Białkowski's term, who died of a heart attack. Białkowski, despite being elected, died before being sworn in.

| Candidate | Party | Votes | % |
|---|---|---|---|
| Piotr Andrzejewski | Independent (KO "S") | 43,080 | 65.07 |
| Kazimierz Falak | Independent | 10,711 | 16.18 |
| Zygmunt Janowski | Independent | 7,572 | 11.44 |
| Stanisław Kersz | Independent | 2,023 | 3.06 |
| Mirosław Kaliszczak | Independent | 1,819 | 2.75 |
| Against all | | 996 | 1.50 |
| Total | | 66,201 | 100.00 |
| Registered voters/turnout | | 464,767 | – |
Source: National Electoral Commission

==== Opole Constituency ====
By-elections were held in the Opole Voivodeship on 4 February 1990, with a runoff on 18 February 1990, to fill a vacancy left by the premature expiration of Edmund Osmańczyk's term, who died on 4 October 1989.

| Candidate | Party | First round | | Second round | |
| Candidate | Party | Votes | % | Votes | % |
|---|---|---|---|---|---|
| Dorota Simonides | Independent (KO "S") | 76,592 | 35.66 | 258,135 | 67.07 |
| Henryk Kroll | Independent | 84,601 | 39.39 | 124,498 | 32.35 |
| Józef Pietrzykowski | Independent | 33,951 | 15.81 | | |
| Jerzy Bobrowski | Independent | 17,265 | 8.04 | | |
| Against all | | 2,387 | 1.11 | 2,213 | 0.58 |
| Total | | 214,796 | 100.00 | 384,846 | 100.00 |
| Registered voters/turnout | | 705,462 | – | 705,702 | – |
Source: National Electoral Commission

==== Lublin Constituency ====
By-elections were held in the Lublin Voivodeship on 27 May 1990, with a runoff on 10 June 1990, to fill a vacancy left by the premature expiration of Adam Stanowski's term, who died on 7 February 1990.

| Candidate | Party | First round | | Second round | |
| Candidate | Party | Votes | % | Votes | % |
|---|---|---|---|---|---|
| Jerzy Kłoczowski | Independent (KO "S") | 91,848 | 40.51 | 47,320 | 50.93 |
| Roman Wierzbicki | Independent | 79,540 | 35.08 | 44,705 | 48.11 |
| Janusz Jurek | Independent | 28,447 | 12.55 | | |
| Marian Fuszara | Independent | 19,487 | 8.59 | | |
| Against all | | 7,407 | 3.27 | 891 | 0.96 |
| Total | | 226,729 | 100.00 | 92,916 | 100.00 |
| Registered voters/turnout | | 728,740 | – | 728,823 | – |
Source: National Electoral Commission

=== 3rd term Senate (1993–1997) ===
==== Chełm Constituency ====
By-elections were held in Chełm Voivodeship on 19 June 1994 to fill a vacancy left by the premature expiration of Tomasz Adamczuk's term, who died.

| Candidate | Party | Votes | % |
|---|---|---|---|
| Piotr Miszczuk | Democratic Left Alliance | 16,384 | 27.79 |
| Elżbieta Rysak | Polish People's Party | 13,244 | 22.46 |
| Jerzy Masłowski | Center-Right Agreement | 10,894 | 18.47 |
| Janusz Korzcyński | Independent | 9,946 | 16.87 |
| Maria Chodyńska | Sovereignist Agreement "Chełmszczyzna" | 8,499 | 14.41 |
| Total | | 58,967 | 100.00 |
| Valid votes | | 58,967 | 93.77 |
| Invalid/blank votes | | 3,915 | 6.23 |
| Total votes | | 62,882 | 100.00 |
| Registered voters/turnout | | 178,806 | 35.17 |
| Democratic Left Alliance gain from Polish People's Party | | | |
Source: National Electoral Commission

==== Elbląg Constituency ====
By-elections were held in Elbląg Voivodeship on 19 June 1994 to fill a vacancy left by the premature expiration of Romuald Jankowski's term, who died.

| Candidate | Party | Votes | % |
|---|---|---|---|
| Stanisław Kochanowski | Polish People's Party | 24,337 | 24.32 |
| Edmund Krasowski | Independent | 22,487 | 22.47 |
| Wacław Bielecki | Solidarity | 11,247 | 11.24 |
| Andrzej Nowosielski | Elbląg Land Electoral Committee | 9,476 | 9.47 |
| Sylwester Kalinowski | Independent | 8,950 | 8.94 |
| Janina Krukowska | Independent | 8,916 | 8.91 |
| Krzysztof Niewdźwiedzki | Labour Union | 8,434 | 8.43 |
| Krzysztof Wójcik | Confederation of Independent Poland | 6,211 | 6.21 |
| Total | | 100,058 | 100.00 |
| Valid votes | | 100,058 | 93.22 |
| Invalid/blank votes | | 7,277 | 6.78 |
| Total votes | | 107,335 | 100.00 |
| Registered voters/turnout | | 339,012 | 31.66 |
| Polish People's Party hold | | | |
Source: National Electoral Commission

==== Szczecin Constituency ====
By-elections were held in Szczecin Voivodeship on 1 October 1995 to fill a vacancy left by the premature expiration of Bodo Engling's term, who resigned.

| Candidate | Party | Votes | % |
|---|---|---|---|
| Artur Balazs | Szczecin Convention | 34,159 | 49.26 |
| Bogusław Liberadzki | Democratic Left Alliance | 23,071 | 33.27 |
| Lech Pruchno-Wróblewski | Szczecin Voivodeship Electoral Committee | 9,135 | 13.17 |
| Piotr Baumgart | Szczecin Region Electoral Electoral Committee "Conscience" | 2,986 | 4.31 |
| Total | | 69,351 | 100.00 |
| Valid votes | | 69,351 | 97.80 |
| Invalid/blank votes | | 1,557 | 2.20 |
| Total votes | | 70,908 | 100.00 |
| Registered voters/turnout | | 714,418 | 9.93 |
| Christian-Peasant Party gain from Democratic Left Alliance | | | |
Source: National Electoral Commission

==== Wrocław Constituency ====
By-elections were held in Szczecin Voivodeship on 1 October 1995 to fill a vacancy left by the premature expiration of Henryk Rot's term, who died.

| Candidate | Party | Votes | % |
|---|---|---|---|
| Kazimierz Działocha | Democratic Left Alliance | 13,869 | 26.07 |
| Bolesław Winiarski | Sovereignist-Patriotic Coalition "Our Poland" | 13,545 | 25.46 |
| Franciszek Połomski | Freedom Union | 11,261 | 21.17 |
| Zbigniew Ślązak | Real Politics Union | 5,448 | 10.24 |
| Edward Czapiewski | Independent | 4,124 | 7.75 |
| Krystyna Nowicka | Labour Union | 2,802 | 5.27 |
| Leszek Bubel | Forum for Fighting Lawlessness | 1,141 | 2.14 |
| Janusz Zagórski | New Civilization Forum "Pyramid" | 1,012 | 1.90 |
| Total | | 53,202 | 100.00 |
| Valid votes | | 53,202 | 98.66 |
| Invalid/blank votes | | 720 | 1.34 |
| Total votes | | 53,922 | 100.00 |
| Registered voters/turnout | | 832,492 | 6.48 |
| Democratic Left Alliance hold | | | |
Source: National Electoral Commission

=== 4th term Senate (1997–2001) ===
==== Katowice Constituency ====
By-elections were held in Katowice Voivodeship on 25 June 2000 to fill a vacancy left by the premature expiration of August Chełkowski's term, who had died.

| Candidate | Party | Votes | % |
|---|---|---|---|
| Adam Graczyński | Democratic Left Alliance | 39,310 | 42.98 |
| Wacław Marszewski | Solidarity Electoral Action | 36,488 | 39.89 |
| Jacek Soska | Polish People's Party | 7,567 | 8.27 |
| Elżbieta Postulska | KPEiR—KPN Ojczyzna | 4,542 | 4.97 |
| Andrzej Roczniok | Real Politics Union | 3,558 | 3.89 |
| Total | | 91,465 | 100.00 |
| Valid votes | | 91,465 | 97.49 |
| Invalid/blank votes | | 2,357 | 2.51 |
| Total votes | | 93,822 | 100.00 |
| Registered voters/turnout | | 2,955,901 | 3.17 |
| Democratic Left Alliance gain from Solidarity Electoral Action | | | |
Source: National Electoral Commission

==== Szczecin Constituency ====
By-elections were held in Katowice Voivodeship on 25 June 2000 to fill a vacancy left by the premature expiration of Marian Jurczyk's term, whose mandate was invalidated by a verdict of the Warsaw Court of Appeals, which accused him of making false lustration statements on 3 April. On 12 April, the Senate debated and voted, with 42 for, 20 against, and 12 abstentions, to recognize the revocation of Jurczyk's mandate.

| Candidate | Party | Votes | % |
|---|---|---|---|
| Zbigniew Zychowicz | Democratic Left Alliance | 26,034 | 53.93 |
| Marek Tałasiewicz | Szczecin Electoral Convention | 16,887 | 34.98 |
| Stefan Oleszczuk | Real Politics Union | 2,099 | 4.35 |
| Maciej Kopeć | Electoral Committee Fatherland | 2,057 | 4.26 |
| Zenon Iwanszkiewicz | Independent | 1,195 | 2.48 |
| Total | | 48,272 | 100.00 |
| Valid votes | | 48,272 | 96.97 |
| Invalid/blank votes | | 1,508 | 3.03 |
| Total votes | | 49,780 | 100.00 |
| Registered voters/turnout | | 747,765 | 6.66 |
| Democratic Left Alliance gain from Independent | | | |
Source: National Electoral Commission

==== Wrocław Constituency ====
By-elections were held in Wrocław Voivodeship on 25 June 2000 to fill a vacancy left by the premature expiration of Bogdan Zdrojewski's term, who resigned to maintain his position as mayor of Wrocław following a Constitutional Tribunal verdict that ruled that Senatorial and mayoral mandates could not be held simultaneously.

| Candidate | Party | Votes | % |
|---|---|---|---|
| Marian Noga | Democratic Left Alliance | 18,122 | 37.13 |
| Adolf Juzewnko | Independent | 15,060 | 30.86 |
| Antoni Stryjewski | Friends of the Polish Family | 9,902 | 20.29 |
| Henryk Czekierda | Polish People's Party | 2,702 | 5.54 |
| Emil Antoniszyn | National Party of Retirees and Pensioners | 1,276 | 2.61 |
| Czesław Kosik | Self-Defence of the Republic of Poland | 1,049 | 2.15 |
| Stanisław Helski | Independent | 691 | 1.42 |
| Total | | 48,802 | 100.00 |
| Valid votes | | 48,802 | 99.21 |
| Invalid/blank votes | | 391 | 0.79 |
| Total votes | | 49,193 | 100.00 |
| Registered voters/turnout | | 862,852 | 5.70 |
| Democratic Left Alliance gain from Independent | | | |
Source: National Electoral Commission

==== Chełm Constituency ====
By-elections were held in Chełm Voivodeship on 21 January 2001 to fill a vacancy left by the premature expiration of Marian Cichosz's term, who resigned.

| Candidate | Party | Votes | % |
|---|---|---|---|
| Adam Rychliczek | Polish People's Party | 8,229 | 40.65 |
| Ryszarda Mardoń | Democratic Left Alliance | 6,765 | 33.41 |
| Wiesław Kociuba | Independent | 3,372 | 16.66 |
| Henryk Lewczuk | Movement for Reconstruction of Poland | 1,880 | 9.29 |
| Total | | 20,246 | 100.00 |
| Valid votes | | 20,246 | 98.61 |
| Invalid/blank votes | | 286 | 1.39 |
| Total votes | | 20,532 | 100.00 |
| Registered voters/turnout | | 188,354 | 10.90 |
| Polish People's Party hold | | | |
Source: National Electoral Commission

==== Wrocław Constituency ====
By-elections were held in Wrocław Voivodeship on 21 January 2001 to fill a vacancy left by the premature expiration of Leon Kieres' term, who resigned.

| Candidate | Party | Votes | % |
|---|---|---|---|
| Bogusław Litwiniec | Democratic Left Alliance | 18,015 | 46.42 |
| Marek Muszyński | Solidarity Electoral Action | 17,737 | 45.70 |
| Leopold Gomułkiewicz | Coalition for Poland | 3,057 | 7.88 |
| Total | | 38,809 | 100.00 |
| Valid votes | | 38,809 | 99.00 |
| Invalid/blank votes | | 391 | 1.00 |
| Total votes | | 39,200 | 100.00 |
| Registered voters/turnout | | 870,086 | 4.51 |
| Democratic Left Alliance gain from Independent | | | |
Source: National Electoral Commission

=== 5th term Senate (2001–2005) ===
==== Constituency 2 (Wałbrzych) ====
By-elections were held in Constituency 2 (Wałbrzych) on 27 April 2003 to fill a vacancy left by the premature expiration of Henryk Gołębiewski's term, who was selected Marshal of the Lower Silesian Voivodeship.

| Candidate | Party | Votes | % |
|---|---|---|---|
| Mirosław Lubiński | Democratic Left Alliance – Labour Union | 7,960 | 38.14 |
| Tomasz Feliks Wójcik | League of Polish Families | 7,086 | 33.96 |
| Wacław Dziendziel | Polish People's Party | 4,685 | 22.45 |
| Ryszard Dudek | Independent | 1,137 | 5.45 |
| Total | | 20,868 | 100.00 |
| Valid votes | | 20,868 | 98.30 |
| Invalid/blank votes | | 360 | 1.70 |
| Total votes | | 21,228 | 100.00 |
| Registered voters/turnout | | 569,053 | 3.73 |
| Democratic Left Alliance hold | | | |
Source: National Electoral Commission

==== Constituency 23 (Białystok) ====
By-elections were held in Constituency 23 (Białystok) on 12 October 2003 to fill a vacancy left by the premature expiration of Adam Jamróz's term, who was chosen as a member of the Constitutional Tribunal. Jurgiel became the second Senator of Law and Justice after Anna Kurska, with who he formed the Law and Justice Senatorial club.

| Candidate | Party | Votes | % |
|---|---|---|---|
| Krzysztof Jurgiel | Law and Justice | 18,198 | 35.29 |
| Marek Kaczyński | League of Polish Families | 10,635 | 20.62 |
| Krzysztof Bil-Jaruzelski | Democratic Left Alliance – Labour Union | 10,516 | 20.39 |
| Mieczysław Bagiński | Polish People's Party | 4,304 | 8.35 |
| Sławomir Zgrzywa | Civic Platform | 3,050 | 5.91 |
| Tadeusz Klimowicz | Real Politics Union | 2,121 | 4.11 |
| Andrzej Soroka | Democratic People's Party | 1,604 | 3.11 |
| Artur Milewski | Independent | 736 | 1.43 |
| Mariusz Olszewski | Alternative Labour Party | 403 | 0.78 |
| Total | | 51,567 | 100.00 |
| Valid votes | | 51,567 | 97.60 |
| Invalid/blank votes | | 1,268 | 2.40 |
| Total votes | | 52,835 | 100.00 |
| Registered voters/turnout | | 937,219 | 5.64 |
| Law and Justice gain from Democratic Left Alliance | | | |
Source: National Electoral Commission

==== Constituency 3 (Wrocław) ====
By-elections were held in Constituency 3 (Wrocław) on 28 March 2004 to fill a vacancy left by the premature of Marian Noga's term, who was chosen as a member of the Monetary Policy Council.

| Candidate | Party | Votes | % |
|---|---|---|---|
| Stanisław Huskowski | Independent | 14,506 | 24.33 |
| Janusz Korwin-Mikke | Independent | 10,782 | 18.08 |
| Władysław Frasyniuk | Freedom Union | 8,797 | 14.75 |
| Jan Rymarczyk | Democratic Left Alliance – Labour Union | 6,757 | 11.33 |
| Artur Paprota | League of Polish Families | 6,140 | 10.30 |
| Emil Antoniszyn | Self-Defence of the Republic of Poland | 4,486 | 7.52 |
| Marek Celejewski | Catholic-National Movement | 3,489 | 5.85 |
| Krzysztof Wronecki | Independent | 2,223 | 3.73 |
| Jacek Bąbka | Independent | 1,265 | 2.12 |
| Stanisław Czerwiński | Polish People's Party | 1,180 | 1.98 |
| Total | | 59,625 | 100.00 |
| Valid votes | | 59,625 | 99.13 |
| Invalid/blank votes | | 521 | 0.87 |
| Total votes | | 60,146 | 100.00 |
| Registered voters/turnout | | 942,043 | 6.38 |
| Independent gain from Democratic Left Alliance | | | |
Source: National Electoral Commission

==== Constituency 29 (Rybnik) ====
By-elections were held in Constituency 29 (Rybnik) on 21 November 2005 to fill a vacancy left by the premature expiration of Adam Graczyński's term, who died.

| Candidate | Party | Votes | % |
|---|---|---|---|
| Klemens Ścierski | Freedom Union | 6,178 | 35.30 |
| Maria Pańczyk-Pozdziej | Civic Platform | 2,787 | 15.92 |
| Paweł Porwoł | League of Polish Families | 2,070 | 11.83 |
| Kazimierz Mikołajec | Law and Justice | 1,960 | 11.20 |
| Krzysztof Kluczniok | "Unity of Upper Silesia" | 1,439 | 8.22 |
| Wacław Czerkawski | "Left Together" | 1,167 | 6.67 |
| Czesław Sobierajski | "Silesian Christian Democracy" | 797 | 4.55 |
| Roman Kurzbauer | Social Democracy of Poland | 742 | 4.24 |
| Stanisław Kijewski | "Nonpartisan Social Movement" | 363 | 2.07 |
| Total | | 17,503 | 100.00 |
| Valid votes | | 17,503 | 98.76 |
| Invalid/blank votes | | 219 | 1.24 |
| Total votes | | 17,722 | 100.00 |
| Registered voters/turnout | | 578,803 | 3.06 |
| Freedom Union gain from Democratic Left Alliance | | | |
Source: National Electoral Commission

==== Constituency 36 (Konin) ====
By-elections were held in Constituency 36 (Konin) on 16 January 2005 to fill a vacancy left by the premature expiration of Ryszard Sławiński's term, who was chosen as a member of the National Broadcasting Council.

| Candidate | Party | Votes | % |
|---|---|---|---|
| Elżbieta Streker-Dembińska | Democratic Left Alliance | 3,909 | 21.20 |
| Jerzy Wojtaszek | League of Polish Families | 3,207 | 17.39 |
| Piotr Florek | Civic Platform | 3,026 | 16.41 |
| Bożena Antczak-Połatyńska | Polish People's Party | 2,344 | 12.71 |
| Jan Zastawny | Self-Defence of the Republic of Poland | 1,947 | 10.56 |
| Wiesława Kowalska | "Self-governance" | 1,704 | 9.24 |
| Ewa Zaleska | Suwerenność-Praca-Sprawiedliwość | 1,283 | 6.96 |
| Izabela Wilk | Freedom Union | 1,019 | 5.53 |
| Total | | 18,439 | 100.00 |
| Valid votes | | 18,439 | 97.89 |
| Invalid/blank votes | | 397 | 2.11 |
| Total votes | | 18,836 | 100.00 |
| Registered voters/turnout | | 593,602 | 3.17 |
| Democratic Left Alliance hold | | | |
Source: National Electoral Commission

=== 6th term Senate (2005–2007) ===
==== Constituency 33 (Elbląg) ====
By-elections were held in Constituency 33 (Elbląg) on 28 January 2007 to fill a vacancy left by the premature expiration of Elżbieta Gelert's term, who was elected one of the city councillors of Elbląg in the 2006 local elections.

| Candidate | Party | Votes | % |
|---|---|---|---|
| Władysław Mańkut | Left and Democrats | 4,026 | 31.49 |
| Antoni Czyżyk | Civic Platform | 3,503 | 27.40 |
| Jolanta Szulc | Polish People's Party | 2,852 | 22.31 |
| Lech Kraśniański | Self-Defence of the Republic of Poland | 1,222 | 9.56 |
| Irena Tarnacka | League of Polish Families | 1,183 | 9.25 |
| Total | | 12,786 | 100.00 |
| Valid votes | | 12,786 | 98.88 |
| Invalid/blank votes | | 145 | 1.12 |
| Total votes | | 12,931 | 100.00 |
| Registered voters/turnout | | 504,321 | 2.56 |
| Left and Democrats gain from Civic Platform | | | |
Source: National Electoral Commission

=== 7th term Senate (2007–2011) ===
In 2010, five by-elections were held, three of which alongside the 2010 Polish presidential election as a result of the deaths of Senators Janina Fetlińska, Stanisław Zając and Krystyna Bochenek in the Smolensk air disaster.

==== Constituency 21 (Krosno) ====
By-elections were held in Constituency 21 (Krosno) on 22 June 2008 to fill a vacancy left by the premature expiration of Andrzej Mazurkiewicz's term, as he died as a result of a ruptured aneurysm on 21 March 2008.

| Candidate | Party | Votes | % | +/– |
|---|---|---|---|---|
| Stanisław Zając | Law and Justice | 40,993 | 48.38 | +9.17 (Note: Only results of Andrzej Mazurkiewicz in 2007) |
| Maciej Lewicki | Civic Platform | 22,457 | 26.50 | −3.1 |
| Marek Jurek | Right Wing of the Republic | 10,751 | 12.69 | +8.92 |
| Andrzej Lepper | Self-Defence of the Republic of Poland | 3,435 | 4.05 | −0.23 |
| Wacław Posadzki | Democratic Left Alliance | 2,703 | 3.19 | −6.18 (Note: Only results of Wacław Posadzki in 2007) |
| Jan Kułaj | Democratic Party – demokraci.pl | 1,774 | 2.09 | − |
| Tadeusz Kaleniecki | Polish Left | 993 | 1.17 | − |
| Stanisław Sagan | Alliance of Democrats | 386 | 0.46 | − |
| Zygmunt Wrzodak | National Congress of Poland | 384 | 0.45 | − |
| Krzysztof Rutkowski | Independent | 357 | 0.42 | − |
| Mirosław Orzechowski | League of Polish Families | 308 | 0.36 | −3.96 |
| Jerzy Wróbel | Polish Labour Party | 194 | 0.23 | − |
| Total | | 84,735 | 100.00 | – |
| Valid votes | | 84,735 | 99.07 | |
| Invalid/blank votes | | 794 | 0.93 | |
| Total votes | | 85,529 | 100.00 | |
| Registered voters/turnout | | 701,499 | 12.19 | |
| Law and Justice hold | | | | |
Source: National Electoral Commission

==== Constituency 15 (Płock) ====
By-elections were held in Constituency 15 (Płock) on 20 June 2010 to fill a vacancy left by the premature expiration of Janina Fetlińska's term, as she died in the Smolensk air disaster. It was held concurrently to the 2010 Polish presidential election.

| Candidate | Party | Votes | % |
|---|---|---|---|
| Michał Boszko | Polish People's Party | 132,426 | 42.72 |
| Marek Martynowski | Law and Justice | 127,446 | 41.11 |
| Tomasz Kałużyński | Poland Plus | 50,111 | 16.17 |
| Total | | 309,983 | 100.00 |
| Valid votes | | 309,983 | 93.99 |
| Invalid/blank votes | | 19,823 | 6.01 |
| Total votes | | 329,806 | 100.00 |
| Registered voters/turnout | | 674,920 | 48.87 |
| Polish People's Party gain from Law and Justice | | | |
Source: National Electoral Commission

==== Constituency 21 (Krosno) ====
By-elections were held in Constituency 21 (Krosno) on 20 June 2010 to fill a vacancy left by the premature expiration of Stanisław Zając's term, as he died in the Smolensk air disaster. It was held concurrently to the 2010 Polish presidential election. PiS-endorsed independent Alicja Zając, the widow of the late incumbent, was elected with no opposition, though 18% of ballots cast were invalid. They were the second Senatorial by-elections held that term in Constituency 21.

| Candidate | Party | Votes | % |
|---|---|---|---|
| Alicja Zając | Law and Justice | 269,928 | 100.00 |
| Total | | 269,928 | 100.00 |
| Valid votes | | 269,928 | 81.57 |
| Invalid/blank votes | | 60,992 | 18.43 |
| Total votes | | 330,920 | 100.00 |
| Registered voters/turnout | | 709,190 | 46.66 |
| Law and Justice hold | | | |
Source: National Electoral Commission

==== Constituency 30 (Katowice) ====
By-elections were held in Constituency 30 (Katowice) on 20 June 2010 to fill a vacancy left by the premature expiration of Krystyna Bochenek's term, as she died in the Smolensk air disaster. It was held concurrently to the 2010 Polish presidential election.

| Candidate | Party | Votes | % |
|---|---|---|---|
| Leszek Marian Piechota | Civic Platform | 244,899 | 59.84 |
| Zbigniew Zdónek | Polish Labour Party | 82,788 | 20.23 |
| Adam Stach | Polish People's Party | 81,561 | 19.93 |
| Total | | 409,248 | 100.00 |
| Valid votes | | 409,248 | 94.07 |
| Invalid/blank votes | | 25,812 | 5.93 |
| Total votes | | 435,060 | 100.00 |
| Registered voters/turnout | | 817,365 | 53.23 |
| Civic Platform hold | | | |
Source: National Electoral Commission

==== Constituency 37 (Piła) ====
By-elections were held in Constituency 37 (Piła) on 6 February 2011 to fill a vacancy left by the premature expiration of Piotr Głowski's term, who was elected mayor of Piła in the 2010 local elections.

Henryk Stokłosa, long-time Senator from Piła Voivodeship, who began his career in the Senate at the 1989 Polish parliamentary election as the only non-Solidarity-endorsed candidate, was running again after being unseated in 2005 Polish parliamentary election. Following the election loss, Stokłosa was arrested for corruption, but released on bail in December 2008. Following the resignation of Piotr Głowski from the post of Senator to become mayor of Piła, Stokłosa declared his start in the upcoming by-elections, and was the first to register. Besides him, three more parties registered candidates: PO nominated Maria Janyska, SLD nominated Zbigniew Ajchler and PSL nominated Leszek Łochowicz. PiS also tried to nominate a candidate but failed to gather enough signatures. In the lead up to election day, Stokłosa was considered a favorite, accusing the government of being in a conspiracy to deprive him of his wealth, and criticizing mainsteam politicians for "taking advantage" of the Smolensk air disaster. He ended up as the victor, winning 39.9% of the vote, being 10.34% ahead of Janyska in second place.

| Candidate | Party | Votes | % | +/– |
|---|---|---|---|---|
| Henryk Stokłosa | Independent | 15,057 | 39.90 | − (Note: New; 17.13% in last election he contested (2005)) |
| Maria Janyska | Civic Platform | 11,156 | 29.56 | +0.28 (Note: Only results of Piotr Głowski in 2007) |
| Zbigniew Ajchler | Democratic Left Alliance | 6,525 | 17.29 | −5.15 |
| Leszek Łochowicz | Polish People's Party | 5,000 | 13.25 | −7.49 |
| Total | | 37,738 | 100.00 | – |
| Valid votes | | 37,738 | 98.24 | |
| Invalid/blank votes | | 678 | 1.76 | |
| Total votes | | 38,416 | 100.00 | |
| Registered voters/turnout | | 609,078 | 6.31 | |
| Independent gain from Civic Platform | | | | |
Source: National Electoral Commission

According to sociologist Rafał Drozdowski, the low turnout of only 6.31% contributed to Stokłosa's victory. After the election, Marshal of the Senate Bogdan Borusewicz stated that if Stokłosa was found guilty, he would be stripped of his Senatorial mandate. He retired from national politics and didn't run again in the regular 2011 parliamentary election, engaging instead in local politics.

=== 8th term Senate (2011–2015) ===
==== Constituency 73 (Rybnik) ====
By-elections were held in Constituency 73 (Rybnik) on 21 April 2013 to fill a vacancy left by the premature expiration of Antoni Motyczka's term, who died.

| Candidate | Party | Votes | % | +/– |
|---|---|---|---|---|
| Bolesław Piecha | Law and Justice | 7,769 | 28.48 | +6.30 |
| Józef Makosz | Independent | 5,345 | 19.59 | +4.72 |
| Mirosław Duży | Civic Platform | 4,913 | 18.01 | −16.10 |
| Paweł Polok | Autonomy for Silesia | 3,578 | 13.12 | −8.80 |
| Grażyna Kohut | Polish People's Party | 2,280 | 8.36 | − |
| Janusz Korwin-Mikke | Congress of the New Right | 2,160 | 7.92 | − |
| Krzysztof Sajewicz | Democratic Left Alliance | 775 | 2.84 | − |
| Piotr Masłowski | Independent | 459 | 1.68 | − |
| Total | | 27,279 | 100.00 | – |
| Valid votes | | 27,279 | 99.18 | |
| Invalid/blank votes | | 226 | 0.82 | |
| Total votes | | 27,505 | 100.00 | |
| Registered voters/turnout | | 246,795 | 11.14 | |
| Law and Justice gain from Civic Platform | | | | |
Source: National Electoral Commission

==== Constituency 55 (Mielec) ====
By-elections were held in Constituency 55 (Mielec) on 8 September 2013 to fill a vacancy left by the premature expiration of Władysław Ortyl's term, who was selected Marshal of the Subcarpathian Voivodeship.

| Candidate | Party | Votes | % | +/– |
|---|---|---|---|---|
| Zdzisław Pupa | Law and Justice | 35,640 | 60.84 | +11.67 |
| Mariusz Kawa | Civic Platform—Polish People's Party | 12,495 | 21.33 | −15.20 |
| Kazimierz Ziobro | Solidarity Poland | 6,494 | 11.09 | − |
| Ewa Kantor | Independent | 1,617 | 2.76 | − |
| Ireneusz Dzieszko | Right-Wing of Podkarpacie | 1,318 | 2.25 | − |
| Andrzej Marciniec | Poland Comes First | 772 | 1.32 | − |
| Józef Habrat | Self-Defence of the Republic of Poland | 247 | 0.42 | − |
| Total | | 58,583 | 100.00 | – |
| Valid votes | | 58,583 | 98.37 | |
| Invalid/blank votes | | 971 | 1.63 | |
| Total votes | | 59,554 | 100.00 | |
| Registered voters/turnout | | 375,985 | 15.84 | |
| Law and Justice hold | | | | |
Source: National Electoral Commission

==== Constituency 47 (Mińsk Mazowiecki) ====
By-elections were held in Constituency 47 (Mińsk Mazowiecki) on 7 September 2014 to fill a vacancy left by the premature expiration of Henryk Górski's term, who died on 19 May 2014.

| Candidate | Party | Votes | % | +/– |
|---|---|---|---|---|
| Maria Koc | Law and Justice | 9,832 | 58.35 | +19.53 |
| Dariusz Jaszczuk | Civic Platform | 4,855 | 28.81 | +3.06 |
| Krzysztof Bosak | National Movement | 1,082 | 6.42 | − |
| Zbigniew Stąsiek | Democratic Left Alliance | 666 | 3.95 | − |
| Czesław Litwińczuk | Democratic Party – demokraci.pl | 226 | 1.34 | − |
| Józef Gorayski | Direct Democracy | 188 | 1.12 | − |
| Total | | 16,849 | 100.00 | – |
| Valid votes | | 16,849 | 98.71 | |
| Invalid/blank votes | | 220 | 1.29 | |
| Total votes | | 17,069 | 100.00 | |
| Registered voters/turnout | | 257,809 | 6.62 | |
| Law and Justice hold | | | | |
Source: National Electoral Commission

==== Constituency 73 (Rybnik) ====
By-elections were held in Constituency 73 (Rybnik) on 7 September 2014 to fill a vacancy left by the premature expiration of Bolesław Piecha's term, who was elected to the European Parliament.

| Candidate | Party | Votes | % | +/– |
|---|---|---|---|---|
| Izabela Kloc | Law and Justice | 11,146 | 48.56 | +20.08 |
| Marek Krząkała | Civic Platform | 9,665 | 42.11 | +24.10 |
| Maciej Urbańczyk | Congress of the New Right | 1,218 | 5.31 | −1.60 |
| Piotr Chmielowski | Democratic Left Alliance | 922 | 4.02 | +2.47 |
| Total | | 22,951 | 100.00 | – |
| Valid votes | | 22,951 | 98.94 | |
| Invalid/blank votes | | 246 | 1.06 | |
| Total votes | | 23,197 | 100.00 | |
| Registered voters/turnout | | 245,829 | 9.44 | |
| Law and Justice hold | | | | |
Source: National Electoral Commission

==== Constituency 82 (Ostrowiec Świętokrzyski) ====
By-elections were held in Constituency 82 (Ostrowiec Świętokrzyski) on 7 September 2014 to fill a vacancy left by the premature expiration of Beata Gosiewska's term, who was elected to the European Parliament.

| Candidate | Party | Votes | % | +/– |
|---|---|---|---|---|
| Jarosław Rusiecki | Law and Justice | 10,098 | 37.04 | −0.48 |
| Kazimierz Kotowski | Polish People's Party | 9,737 | 35.71 | +13.06 |
| Zbigniew Pacelt | Civic Platform | 3,817 | 14.00 | − |
| Kazimierz Jesionek | Democratic Left Alliance | 1,950 | 7.15 | −9.83 |
| Czesław Litwińczuk | Congress of the New Right | 1,338 | 4.91 | − |
| Józef Gorayski | Direct Democracy | 325 | 1.19 | − |
| Total | | 27,265 | 100.00 | – |
| Valid votes | | 27,265 | 98.28 | |
| Invalid/blank votes | | 476 | 1.72 | |
| Total votes | | 27,741 | 100.00 | |
| Registered voters/turnout | | 349,660 | 7.93 | |
| Law and Justice hold | | | | |
Source: National Electoral Commission

==== Constituency 75 (Tychy) ====
By-elections were held in Constituency 75 (Tychy) on 8 February 2015 to fill a vacancy left by the premature expiration of Elżbieta Bieńkowska's term, who was chosen as a member of the European Commission.

| Candidate | Party | Votes | % | +/– |
|---|---|---|---|---|
| Czesław Ryszka | Law and Justice | 8,541 | 56.57 | − |
| Michał Gramatyka | Civic Platform | 4,452 | 29.49 | −15.75 |
| Dariusz Dyrda | Silesian – Not Partisan | 2,104 | 13.94 | −18.41 |
| Total | | 15,097 | 100.00 | – |
| Valid votes | | 15,097 | 98.85 | |
| Invalid/blank votes | | 175 | 1.15 | |
| Total votes | | 15,272 | 100.00 | |
| Registered voters/turnout | | 207,932 | 7.34 | |
| Law and Justice gain from Civic Platform | | | | |
Source: National Electoral Commission

=== 9th term Senate (2015–2019) ===
==== Constituency 59 (Białystok I) ====
By-elections were held in Constituency 59 (Białystok I) on 6 March 2016 to fill a vacancy left by the premature expiration of Bohdan Paszkowski's term, who was selected Voivode of Podlasie.

| Candidate | Party | Votes | % | +/– |
|---|---|---|---|---|
| Anna Maria Anders | Law and Justice | 30,661 | 47.26 | −2.39 |
| Mieczysław Bagiński | Polish People's Party | 26,618 | 41.03 | +13.36 |
| Jerzy Ząbkiewicz | Independent | 4,177 | 6.44 | − |
| Szczepan Barszczewski | Confederation for the Renewal of the Republic of Liberty and Hope | 1,992 | 3.07 | − |
| Sławomir Gromadzki | Ordinary Citizen | 764 | 1.18 | − |
| Andrzej Chmielewski | Self-Defence of the Republic of Poland | 669 | 1.03 | − |
| Total | | 64,881 | 100.00 | – |
| Valid votes | | 64,881 | 99.41 | |
| Invalid/blank votes | | 384 | 0.59 | |
| Total votes | | 65,265 | 100.00 | |
| Registered voters/turnout | | 381,382 | 17.11 | |
| Law and Justice hold | | | | |
Source: National Electoral Commission

=== 11th term Senate (2023–incumbent) ===
==== Constituency 13 (Włocławek) ====
By-elections were held in Constituency 13 (Włocławek) on 21 July 2024 to fill a vacancy left by the premature expiration of Krzysztof Kukucki's term, who was elected mayor of Włocławek in the 2024 local elections. The election sparked controversy in the ruling coalition as the incumbent mayor of Włocławek defeated by Kukucki, Marek Wojtkowski, belonged to the Civic Platform, and Kukucki to the New Left. The Senate Pact debated whether Kukucki's replacement should be a member of a party different from his own. Ultimately, the New Left was allowed to field its own candidate, Stanisław Pawlak, without opposition from the rest of the governing coalition. Pawlak won the election with 46.3% of valid votes.

| Candidate | Party | Votes | % | +/– |
|---|---|---|---|---|
| Stanisław Pawlak | New Left | 9,888 | 46.30 | +0.25 |
| Jarosław Chmielewski | Righteous and Effective | 7,621 | 35.69 | −0.93 |
| Tomasz Sikorowski | Confederation New Hope | 3,846 | 18.01 | +8.30 |
| Total | | 21,355 | 100.00 | – |
| Valid votes | | 21,355 | 98.96 | |
| Invalid/blank votes | | 224 | 1.04 | |
| Total votes | | 21,579 | 100.00 | |
| Registered voters/turnout | | 271,454 | 7.95 | |
| New Left hold | | | | |
Source: National Electoral Commission

==== Constituency 33 (Kraków IV) ====
By-elections were held in Constituency 33 (Kraków IV) on 16 March 2025 to fill a vacancy left by the premature expiration of Bogdan Klich's term, who resigned from office to assume a diplomatic post. The Confederation's candidate, Adam Berkowicz, was the father of Konrad Berkowicz. Monika Piątkowska of the Civic Coalition won the election, successfully holding the seat for her party. At the same time, her margin was lower than Klich's by 20 percentage points despite the seat being a stronghold of the Civic Coalition. Political observers called the outcome a "bittersweet victory" for the Civic Coalition, and attributed the underwhelming margin to competition from the Together Party, the refusal of Poland 2050, a coalition partner of Civic Coalition, to endorse Piątkowska, as well as the fact that Piątkowska is not well-known in Kraków, and was nominated by the party leadership contrary to the wishes of the party's local branch.

| Candidate | Party | Votes | % | +/– |
|---|---|---|---|---|
| Monika Piątkowska | Civic Coalition (Note: Endorsed by PSL, NL and SDPL) | 25,022 | 50.14 | −20.76 |
| Mateusz Małodziński | For Kraków | 15,675 | 31.41 | +2.31 |
| Adam Berkowicz | Confederation | 5,223 | 10.47 | − |
| Ewa Sładek | Together Party | 3,982 | 7.98 | − |
| Total | | 49,902 | 100.00 | – |
| Valid votes | | 49,902 | 99.47 | |
| Invalid/blank votes | | 265 | 0.53 | |
| Total votes | | 50,167 | 100.00 | |
| Registered voters/turnout | | 303,678 | 16.52 | |
| Civic Coalition hold | | | | |
Source: National Electoral Commission

==== Constituency 20 (Zielona Góra) ====
By-elections were held in Constituency 20 (Zielona Góra) on 22 November 2026 to fill a vacancy left by the premature expiration of Mirosław Różański's term, who died. Różański was elected as a Senator in the 2023 elections on the electoral list of Poland 2050, and then left Poland 2050 to co-found New Poland – Centre. He died on 24 August 2026.

As Poland 2050 was a part of the ruling 15 October Coalition and its Senate Pact 2023, the ruling coalition was to nominate a joint candidate. Initially, Poland 2050 demanded that the coalition nominate its candidate, Izabela Ziętka. However, ultimately the Senate Pact fielded Różański's widowed wife, Zdzisława Różańska, as its candidate. This decision was criticized as secretive and was done without knowledge of local activists. Rózańska's decision to run was connected to Różański's brother, Daniel Różański, becoming a member of the Confederation of the Polish Crown.

The by-election also marked the first attempt amongst right-wing parties to create its own, right-wing Senate pact to counter the ruling one. While Law and Justice and Confederation agreed to jointly endorse the former Zielona Góra mayor Janusz Kubicki, Confederation of the Polish Crown nominated its own candidate Tomasz Naruszewicz. Kubicki is running under his own electoral committee, Lubuskie First (Polish: Po Pierwsze Lubuskie). The White-Red Movement (Polish: Ruch Biało-Czerwoni), founded in 2026 by Ewa Zajączkowska-Hernik, has initially fielded its own candidate, Olimpia Tomczyk-Iwko. However, on 7 October, Tomczyk-Iwko dropped out and the White-Red Movement endorsed Kubicki.

Separate candidates were also nominated by Bezpartyjni Samorządowcy (Sławomir Bładyko), New Wave (its leader Joanna Senyszyn), as well as Normal Country (Maria Branicka-Łosińska). However, Bładyko and Branicka-Łosińska ultimately failed to register, with Senyszyn becoming another candidate. An electoral committee was also registered by Samoobrona.

| Candidate | Party | Votes | % |
|---|---|---|---|
| Zdzisława Różańska | 15 October Coalition Electoral Committee (Note: Endorsed by Civic Coalition, The Left, Poland 2050, Polish People's Party, and Centre Union.) | 13,489 | 42.75 |
| Janusz Kubicki | Lubuskie First (Note: Endorsed by Law and Justice, Confederation Liberty and Independence, and White-Red Movement.) | 9,682 | 30.68 |
| Joanna Senyszyn | New Wave | 4,702 | 14.90 |
| Tomasz Naruszewicz | Confederation of the Polish Crown | 3,682 | 11.67 |
| Total | | 31,555 | 100.00 |
| Senate Pact 2023 hold | | | |
Source: National Electoral Commission

== Analysis ==
Turnout in Senate by-elections tends to be low, frequently falling under 7%. Between 1989 and 2014, the average turnout of Senate by-elections was 13.94%. Turnout also tends to be higher when by-elections are held alongside regular elections, and turnout for by-elections only neared 50% (reaching 47%, 49%, 53% in three constituencies respectively) when held alongside the 2010 presidential election. In contrast to the apathy expressed in by-elections by the populace, political parties show high interest in them. By-elections tend to show trends in political support; however they are often flawed as a political barometer. Costs of by-elections vary within the range of a half to two million złoty.
