= 2010 Polish Senate by-elections =

Three by-elections to the Senate were held in Poland on 20 June 2010, at the same time as the presidential election. They were held to replace Krystyna Bochenek in Katowice (Civic Platform), Janina Fetlińska in Płock and Stanisław Zając in Krosno (both Law and Justice), who died in the 2010 Polish Air Force Tu-154 crash on 10 April 2010.

The results were as follows:

- In Katowice, Leszek Piechota held the seat for the PO with 244,899 votes against the Polish Labour Party's Zbigniew Zdónek with 82,788 votes and Adam Stach (PiS) with 81,561 votes; turnout was 53.47%.
- In Płock, Michał Boszko took the seat for the Polish People's Party with 132,427 votes against Marek Martynowski from PiS with 127,446 votes and Tomasz Kałużyński from Poland Plus with 50,111 votes; turnout was 48.97%.
- In Krosno, Zając’s widow Alicja Zając held the seat for PiS with 269,928; she had no opponent. Turnout was 47.07%.
