= White and Red Movement =

White and Red Movement Ruch Biało-Czerwoni
- Abbreviation: RBC
- Leader: Ewa Zajączkowska-Hernik
- Registered: 3 June 2026
- Split from: New Hope
- Headquarters: Krucza 16/22; 00-526 Warsaw
- Membership (2026): +1,200
- Ideology: Polish nationalism Economic nationalism
- Political position: Right-wing
- National affiliation: Confederation Liberty and Independence
- European affiliation: Patriots for Europe
- Colours: Red
- Sejm: 0 / 460
- Senate: 0 / 100
- European Parliament: 1 / 51
- Regional assemblies: 0 / 552
- City presidents: 0 / 117

Website
- bialo-czerwoni.com.pl

The White and Red Movement (Polish: Ruch Biało-Czerwoni, RBC) is a Polish political association registered by the Member of the European Parliament Ewa Zajączkowska-Hernik on 3 June 2026. The association was founded by Zajączkowska-Hernik after her expulsion from New Hope, caused by her defection to Patriots for Europe from Europe of Sovereign Nations, which New Hope is a member of. However, Zajączkowska-Hernik remained in the broader alliance of the Confederation Liberty and Independence, which consists of New Hope as well as the National Movement, with the latter being a member of Patriots for Europe.

The foundation of the association was supported by the National Movement, while opposed by New Hope. The White and Red Movement has members of both parties in its ranks, with the former supporting it and the latter expelling its own members for joining Zajączkowska-Hernik. The association opposes the economic liberalism of New Hope and provides a political alternative to it. However, instead of seeking to become a new faction of Konfederacja, the White and Red Movement has become a vehicle of Zajączkowska-Hernik's political ambitions, given her popularity. The association draws its support from all major Polish right-wing parties.

== History ==
=== Background ===
Prior to 2023, Zajączkowska-Hernik was a journalist for websites such as wSensie.pl oraz ŚwiatRolnika.info, and was also associated with Janusz Korwin-Mikke's movement in Radom. In 2023, she became a member of the Confederation Liberty and Independence and was convinced by Sławomir Mentzen to run in the 2023 Polish parliamentary election for the Sejm. However, she failed to gain a seat. She tried to enter politics again in the 2024 Polish local elections, where she ran for a seat in the Masovian Voivodeship Sejmik, but also unsuccessfully. She was made Konfederacja's candidate for the third time in the 2024 European Parliament election in Poland. This time, she successfully won a seat in the European Parliament.

Following her successful election, she became unexpectedly popular in social media, and went viral for her scathing critique of the EU’s migration policy and Ursula von der Leyen. She quickly gained reputation as a daring and eloquent politician, and continued to attract media attention through her highly populist and aggressive language. She became a member of Mentzen's New Hope, and its European group of choice, Europe of Sovereign Nations.

However, a conflict between her and Mentzen emerged in the 2025 Polish presidential election. Zajączkowska-Hernik defended the participation of Grzegorz Braun and his Confederation of the Polish Crown in elections, stating that Braun and Konfederacja perform better separately compared to Konfederacja's results prior to split, and thus strengthen the Polish right as a whole.

=== Break with New Hope ===
On 25 March 2026, Zajączkowska-Hernik left the Europe of Sovereign Nations and joined Patriots for Europe instead, an European party to which a different faction of Konfederacja, Krzysztof Bosak's National Movement, belongs. New Hope interpreted the move as betrayal and stated that Zajączkowska-Hernik "self-excluded" herself from the party.

This was contested by Zajączkowska-Hernik, who argued that her European affilitation change does not contradict the party statue in any way. She stated that New Hope's statute does not have any mechanism of 'self-exclusion', which was confirmed after a legal analysis of the statute that she requested. However, her expulsion from the party was announced shortly after.

=== Foundation ===
On 3 June 2026, Zajączkowska-Hernik registered the association, and announced it on 11 June. She stated that she created White and Red Movement after receiving numerous requests for her own political initiative from her sympathizers that she organizes on social media, known as "Ewa's squad". Zajączkowska-Hernik became the president of the association, while the party's board consists of six people, including Marek Szewczyk, who is a member of Konfederacja's Leaders' Council as well as a member of the National Movement. Szewczyk's presence in the association was formally approved by the National Movement.

Since the expulsion of Zajączkowska-Hernik from New Hope, several people from the Warsaw district have left New Hope in protest. According to Onet, there has been a lot of interest in Zajączkowska-Hernik's association within New Hope, which is seen as an alternative to those unsatisfied with Mentzen. New Hope has been expelling members who joined or considered joining the White and Red Movement. At the same time, Konfederacja has declared that it will field Zajączkowska-Hernik on its electoral lists.

The association elicited mixed reactions from Konfederacja. The spokesman for New Hope, Grzegorz Płaczek, expressed concerns that the White and Red Movement would be a form of competition for his party. In turn, the vice president of the National Movement, Krzysztof Tuduj, "warmly welcomed" Zajączkowska-Hernik's association. For her part, Zajączkowska-Hernik stated that she will remain in Konfederacja, and that her association "will do everything in its power to ensure that the right achieves a historic result in every election, and above all in the upcoming elections."

According to Tygodnik Solidarność, the association provides Zajączkowska-Hernik with "her own base within the broader Confederation, people to fill electoral lists, and—should a divorce from the Confederation ever occur—become a ready-made base for an independent party." Given Zajączkowska-Hernik's popularity, her position within Konfederacja has been described as "hard to ignore". She has been open about her plans to either contest the Next Polish parliamentary election or become a candidate for president.

Her association has been compared to Mateusz Morawiecki's Development Plus, who left Law and Justice in order to develop it, as well as the failed attempt to build a new faction in Konfederacja, Wolnościowcy. However, according to Interia, the White and Red Movement is not an attempt to build a party but rather to project strengthen and enter the National Movement. At the same time, Zajączkowska-Hernik and her movement are positively seen by Grzegorz Braun, who reportedly considers inviting her to his party's electoral list.

=== Later activities ===
Rzeczpospolita argued that Zajączkowska-Hernik is the "number one among female politicians" and "regularly competes in social media rankings with Nawrocki, Tusk, and Mentzen". As such, her association is seen as a great asset to any force that it ultimately aligns itself with. According to Radio ZET, the association will not function as a faction in Konfederacja, but rather is a means of promoting Zajączkowska-Hernik. It has been described as independent from both New Hope and the National Movement, the two main parties of Konfederacja. It has been noted that Zajączkowska-Hernik might be considering a cooperation with the president Karol Nawrocki, of whom she has been very supportive. However, Zajączkowska-Hernik stated that she plans to run in the 2027 parliamentary election from the lists of Konfederacja.

The association initially fielded its own candidate for the 22 November 2026 Senate by-election in Zielona Góra following the death of senator Mirosław Różański. The White and Red Movement presented Olimpia Tomczyk-Iwko as its candidate. However, following the agreement between Law and Justice and Konfederacja to jointly endorse Janusz Kubicki as a way to unite right-wing parties against the ruling Senate Pact 2023, Tomczyk-Iwko had dropped out, endorsing Kubicki.

== Ideology ==
The association has been described as right-wing. It accentuates "concern for the future of the homeland, respect for its traditions and a deep sense of social responsibility." The association has been described as ideologically nationalist, including on economic matters; it presents an alternative to economic liberalism of Konfederacja. While hostile to the economic liberals of Konfederacja, it is ideologically aligned with the National Movement and Confederation of the Polish Crown, including on issues such as migration, where all three movements espouse strongly anti-immigrant views.

The White and Red Movement mirrors the views of Zajączkowska-Hernik, with its agenda including opposition to both the European Green Deal as internet regulation (especially chat control), as well as skepticism towards military aid to Ukraine. It is also strongly anti-EU, with Zajączkowska-Hernik arguing that the European Union is gradually collapsing. The association is considered to have a broad appeal and to attract not only a part Konfederacja's base, but also other some voters of Law and Justice and Confederation of the Polish Crown. It opposes economic liberalism, reflecting Zajączkowska-Hernik's mutual hostility with the most liberal parts of the New Hope.

The association declared that it strives to "build the spirit of a nation that stands strong behind itself" and gathers those who "correctly define the state's interests, because Poland should be proud, strong, effective, pragmatic, and safe." It presents itself as "a place for people with different views who share one thing: concern for the well-being of Poland and its citizens", and lists "responsibility, solidarity, and working for the common good" as its values.

Describing the association's goals, Zajączkowska-Hernik states that the association will control central and local governments by "keeping an eye on politicians, exposing pathologies, controlling the spending of public money and using civic tools such as access to public information and public consultations." It also acts as "a forge of personnel" to prepare potential policial leaders by recruiting activists, experts, and lawyers. The White and Red Movement also offers aid to those who faced injustice as a result of a "bureaucratic office" or "a soulless institution".
