= Olimpia Tomczyk-Iwko =

Polish politician

Deputy Voivode of Lubusz Voivodeship
- In office 22 November 2021 – 21 December 2023

Personal details
- Born: 21 August 1978 (age 48) Zielona Góra, Poland
- Education: University of Zielona Góra

Olimpia Joanna Tomczyk-Iwko (born 21 August 1978 in Zielona Góra) is a Polish politician and entrepreneur who served as the Deputy Voivode of Lubusz Voivodeship from 2021 to 2023.

== Biography ==
Tomczyk-Iwko graduated in political science from the University of Zielona Góra and completed a postgraduate course in social rehabilitation at the Higher School of Management and Entrepreneurship in Wałbrzych. She has worked, amongst other things, at a social welfare centre, as a probation officer and a fitness instructor, as well as in a private company. She later went on to run her own business, becoming the owner of BioPiwo.

She became involved in campaigning for single-member districts and in the so-called ‘Zmieleni’ Movement. She became a representative of the Kukiz'15 committee in the Lubusz Voivodeship, and stood as a candidate on its behalf for the 2015 Polish parliamentary election, and for the 2019 European Parliament election in Poland. In 2018, her candidacy for Mayor of Zielona Góra was announced, but her committee failed to complete the registration formalities. She also held positions within the leadership of the organisations ‘Association for a New Constitution – Kukiz’15’ and ‘Warriors’15 Association’. She left Paweł Kukiz’s movement following the formation of an electoral alliance with the Polish People's Party. She later joined Sovereign Poland, and in 2020 became head of the party's Lubusz structures.

On 22 November 2021, she was appointed to the newly created post of second deputy voivode of Lubusz (with responsibility for social affairs and government and European programmes). On 21 December 2023, she was removed from her position as deputy voivode by the newly appointed Prime Minister Donald Tusk. In the 2024 Polish local elections, she stood as a candidate for the Lubusz Voivodeship Sejmik on behalf of the KWW Confederation and Independent Local Government Officials.

In October 2026, she was nominated as a candidate in the November 2026 Zielona Góra by-election by the White-Red Movement of Ewa Zajączkowska-Hernik. However, she decided to step down and endorse the joint candidate of Law and Justice and Confederation Janusz Kubicki; the White-Red Movement subsequently endorsed Kubicki as well.

== Personal life ==
She lives in Brzeźnica, Krosno County together with her husband.
