= Maria Janyska =

Polish economist and politician

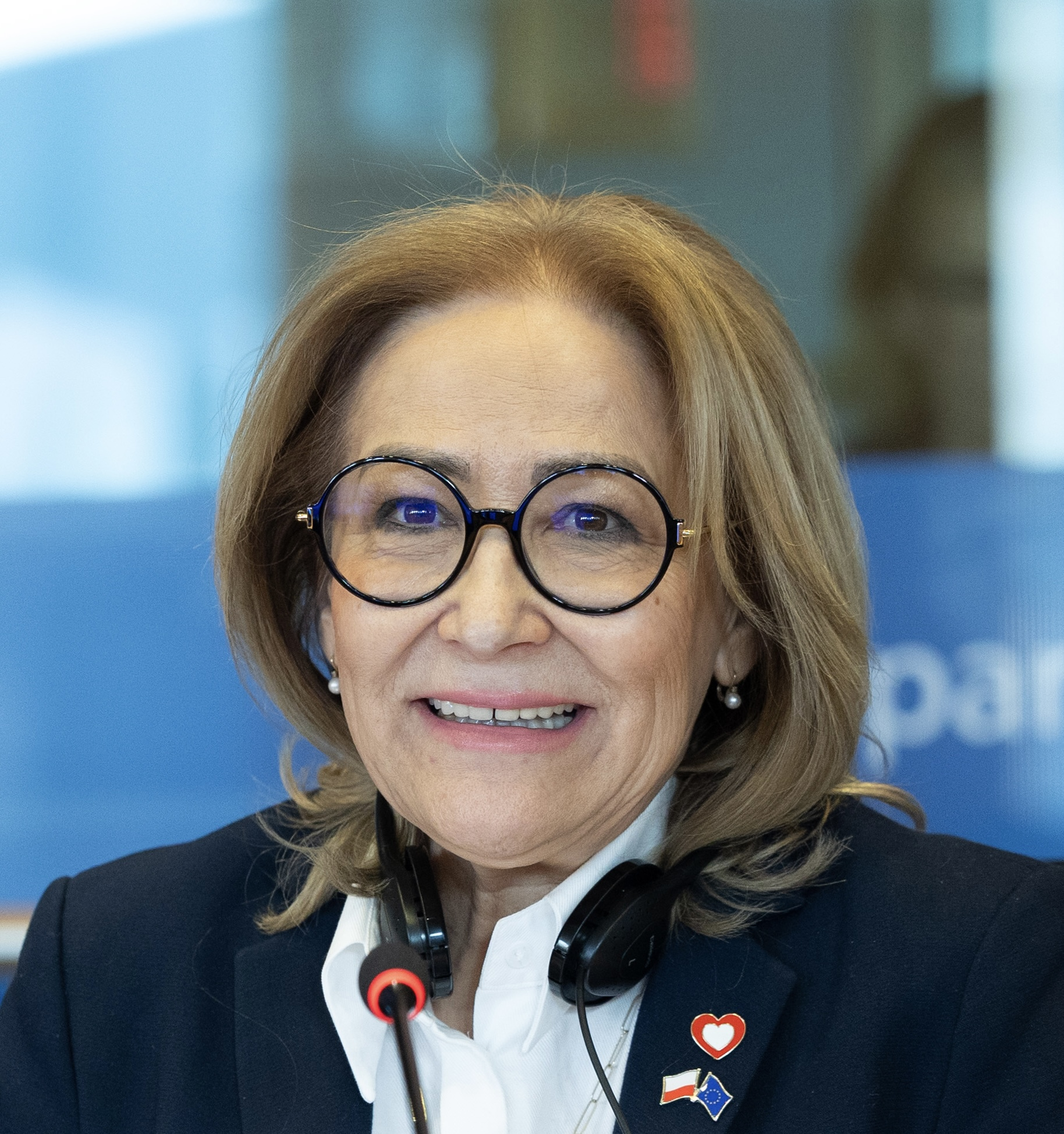
- Janyska in 2025

Member of the Polish Parliament
- Incumbent
- Assumed office 2011

Personal details
- Born: January 16, 1962 (age 64) Wyrzysk
- Party: Civic Platform
- Education: University of Economics in Poznań
- Occupation: Economist, Politician

Maria Małgorzata Janyska (née Chojcan; born January 16, 1962, in Wyrzysk) is a Polish local government official, economist, and member of the Sejm of the Republic of Poland for the VII, VIII, IX, and X terms.

== Career ==
From 1998 to 2002, Janyska was a member of the Czarnków-Trzcianka County Council during its first term. She returned to local government in 2010, when she was elected to the voivodeship sejmik of Greater Poland Voivodeship as a member of the Civic Platform in the local elections.

In February 2011, she ran for a senate seat in the by-elections held after Piotr Głowski was elected mayor of Pila. She finished second in the vote, losing to Henryk Stokłosa. In the 2011 parliamentary elections, she received 12,132 votes, winning a parliamentary seat for Civic Platform in the Pila district.

In 2015, she successfully ran for reelection to the Sejm (receiving 21,700 votes). In the VIII Sejm, she became the deputy chair of the Extraordinary Committee for Deregulation and a member of the Committee on Administration and Internal Affairs and the Committee on Economy and Development. In the 2019 and 2023 elections, she again won parliamentary seats, running as part of the Civic Coalition and receiving 30,783 and 23,592 votes, respectively. In the IX term, she was the deputy chair of the Committee on Economy and Development, and in the X term, she became the deputy chair of the Committee on Administration and Internal Affairs.
