= Mieczysław Bagiński =

Polish politician

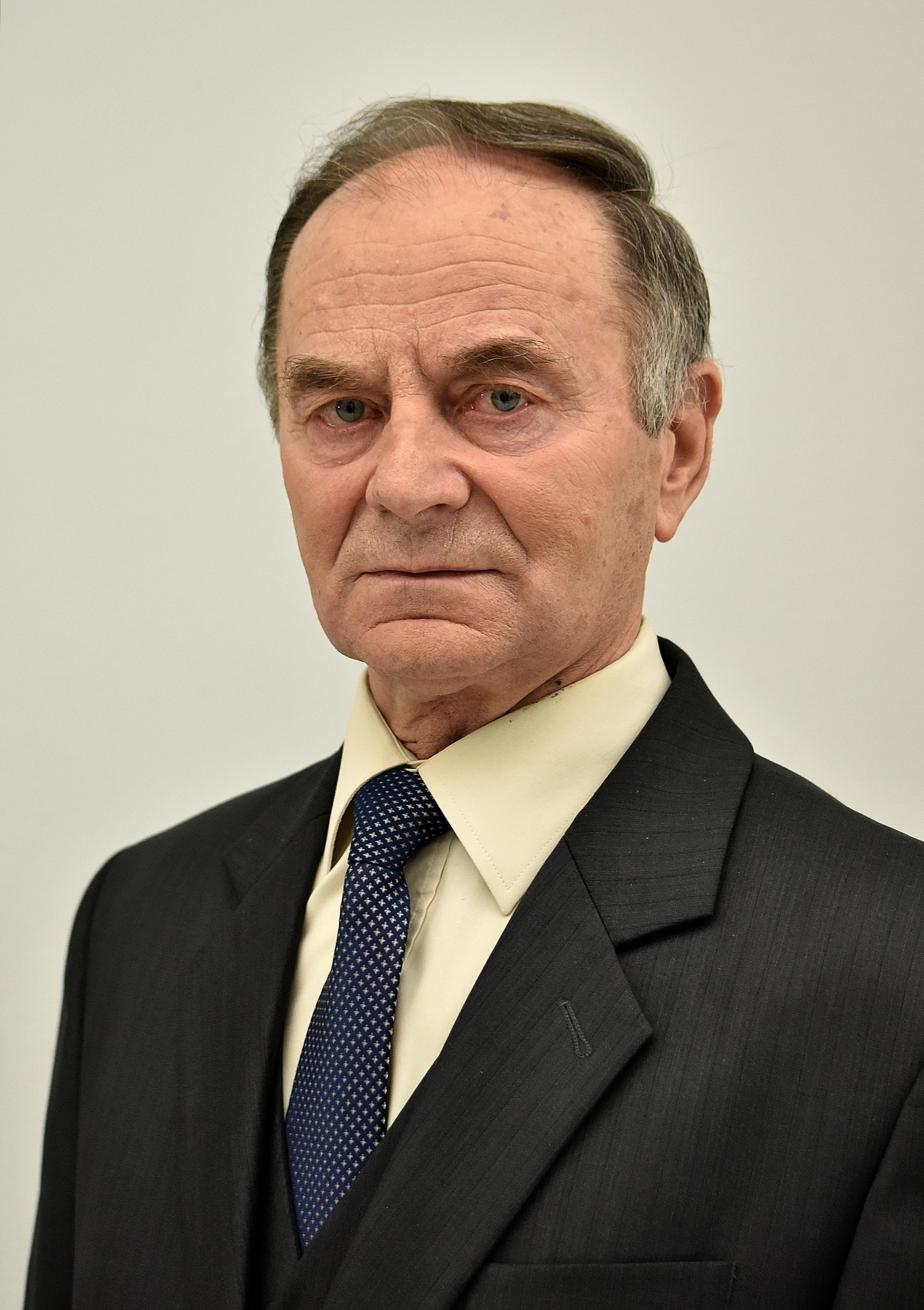

Voivode of Łomża Voivodeship
- In office 1994–1997
- Preceded by: Jerzy Brzeziński
- Succeeded by: Sławomir Zgrzywa

Personal details
- Born: 15 August 1944 (age 82) Koniecki Małe
- Party: Polish People's Party
- Occupation: teacher, politician

Mieczysław Bagiński (born August 15, 1944 in Koniecki Małe) – Polish politician, local official, former Voivode of Łomża Voivodeship.

== Biography ==
From 1992 to 1994 he was the vice-voivode of Łomża Voivodeship, then he obtainend the voivode office (1994-1997).

He was ZSL activist. He belongs to the Polish People's Party (PSL). From the list of this party in 1998 he became a councilor of the Podlaskie Regional Assembly. He successfully applied for re-election in 2002, 2006 and early elections in 2007, after which he assumed the seat of chairman of the regional council. In 2010 and in 2014, he won a mandate for next terms. In 2018 he did not apply for re-election.

Bagiński unsuccessfully ran in 1997, 2003, 2007, 2011, 2015 and 2016 to the Senate, in 2005 to the Sejm and in 2009 to the European Parliament.
