= 2016 Senate District 59 by-election in Poland =

By-election in District 59, 2016
- Turnout: 17.11%
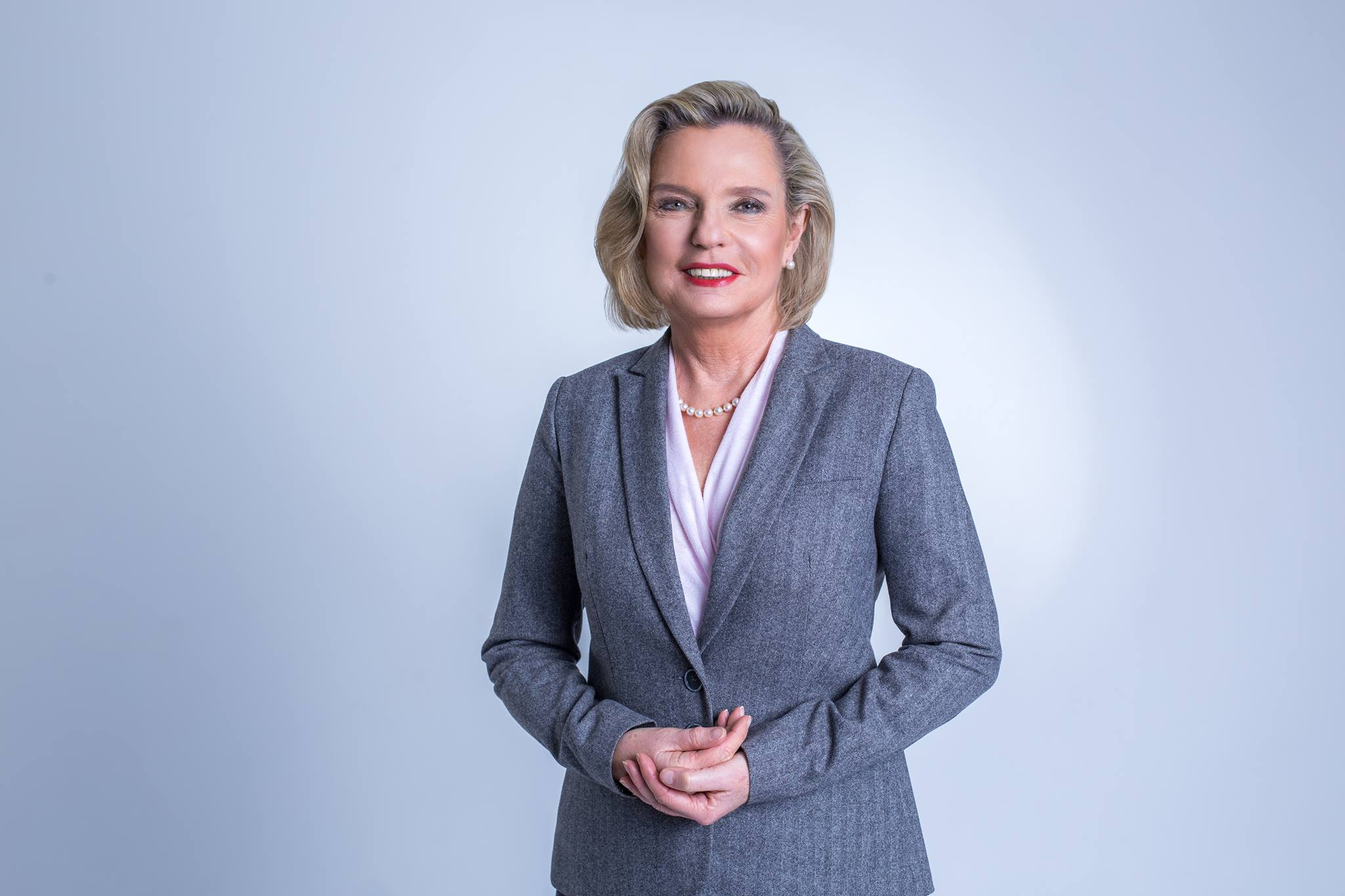

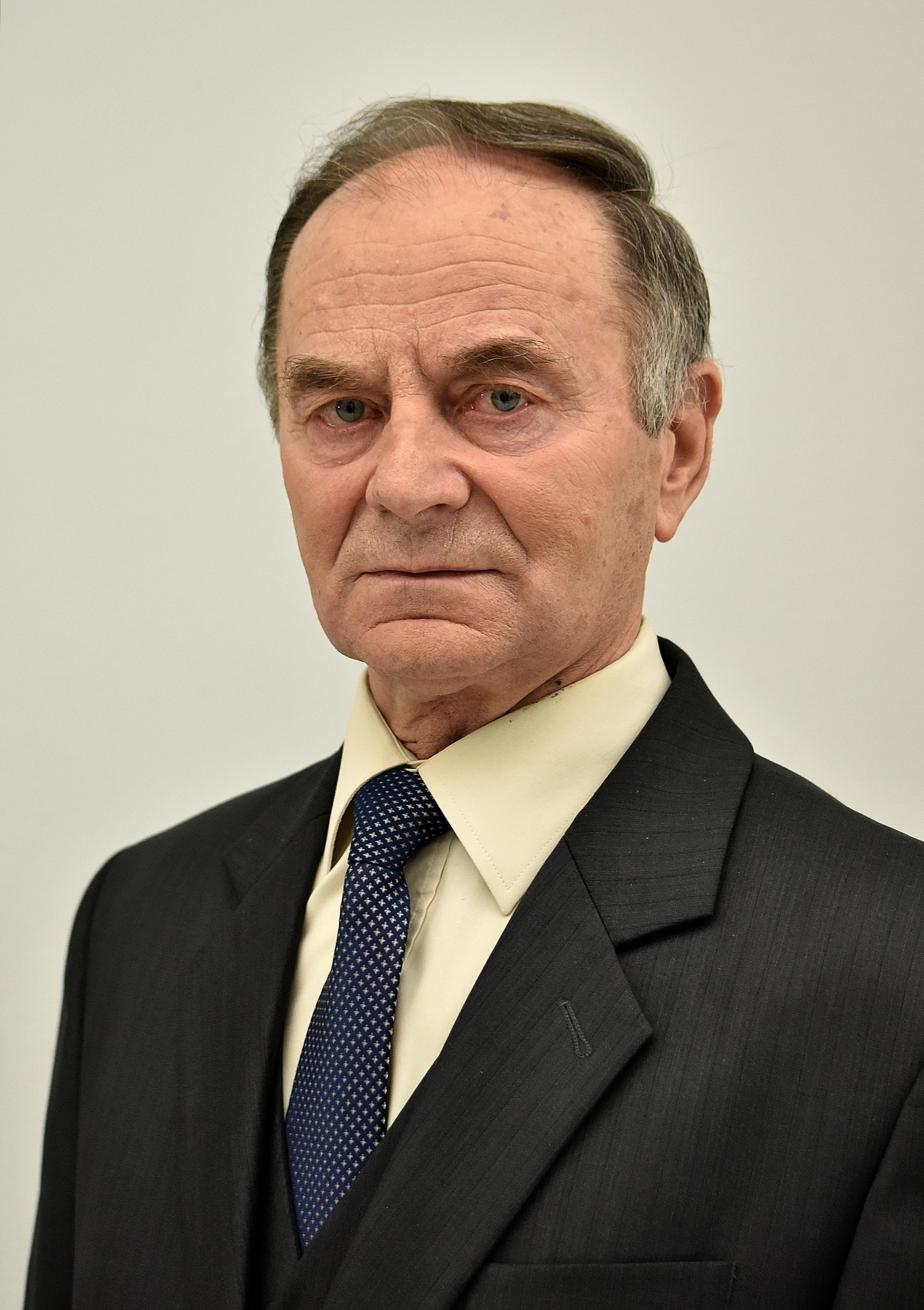
Party	PiS	PSL
Popular vote	30,661	26,618
Percentage	47.26%	41.03%

Senate District 59

A by-elections in Senate District 59 was held in Poland on 6 March 2016. The election was required due to the President Andrzej Duda appointing incumbent Senator Bohdan Paszkowski as the Voivode of Podlaskie.

The result was a victory for Anna Maria Anders of the Law and Justice party. Voter turnout was just 17.11%.

== Background ==
The front-runner of these elections was the right-wing candidate Anna Maria Anders, who received the support of PiS. A few months earlier the PiS candidate Bohdan Paszkowski won nearly half of votes there. The centrist and leftist opposition united and supported Mieczysław Bagiński, who took the second place in this district a few months ago. He obtained the support of PSL, PO, Modern, and SLD. In elections he won over 40% (previously 27.44%) of votes, but it did not allow him to win a mandate, because Anna Maria Anders won 6% more votes.

== Result ==
2016 Senate District 59 by-election
Party	Candidate	Votes	%	±%
PiS	Anna Maria Anders	30,661	47.26	▼2.39
PSL	Mieczysław Bagiński	26,618	41.03	▲13.59
Independent	Jerzy Ząbkiewicz	4,177	6.44	Steady
KORWiN	Szczepan Barszczewski	1,992	3.07	Steady
Independent	Sławomir Gromadzki	764	1.18	Steady
Independent	Andrzej Chmielewski	669	1.03	Steady
