= Silesian Theatre =

Theatre in Poland

Coordinates: 50°15′34″N 19°01′21″E

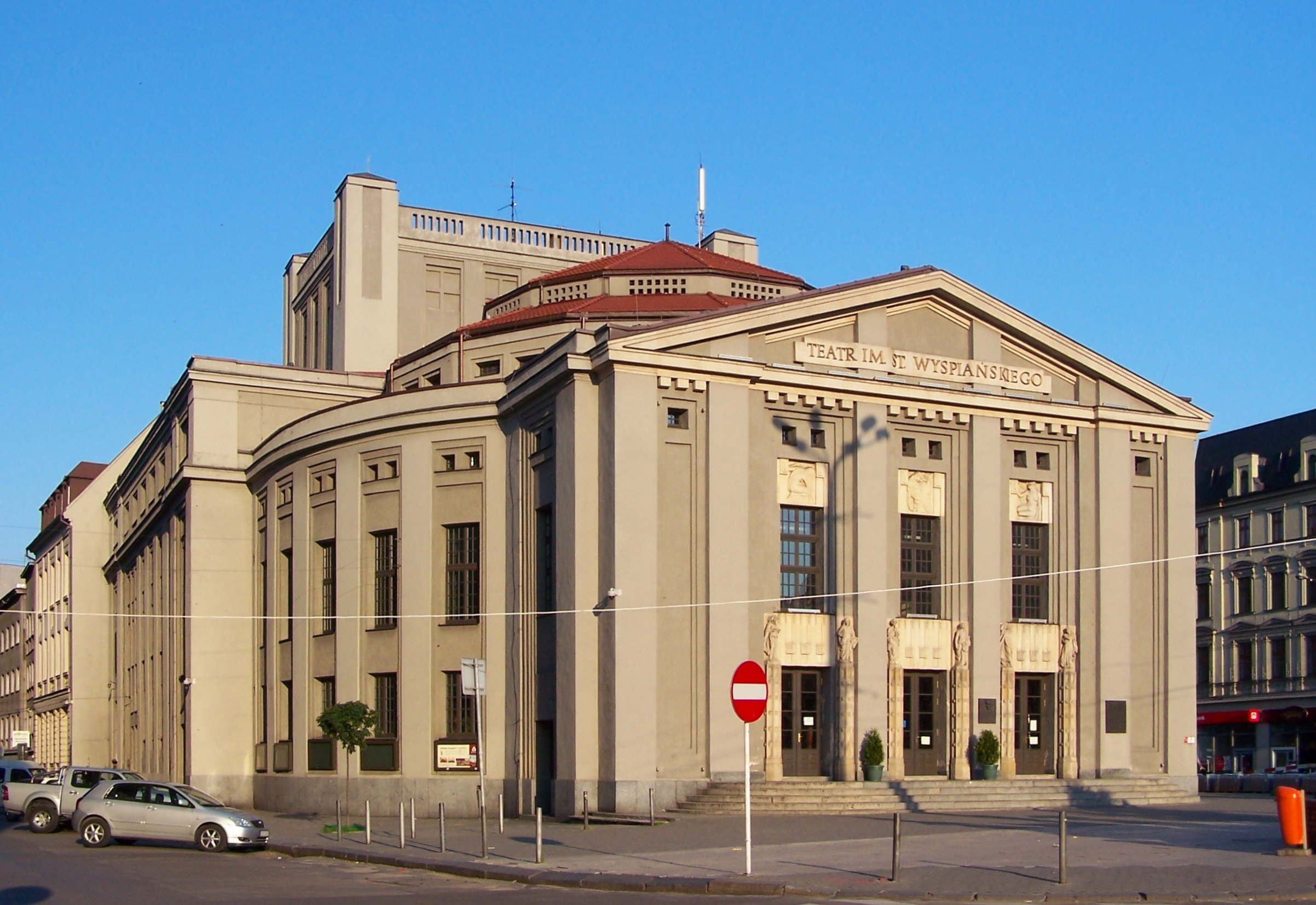
Silesian Theatre

Silesian Theatre (Polish: Teatr Śląski) dedicated to Stanisław Wyspiański is the largest theatre in Silesia. It is located on the market square in Katowice.

It was built as "German Theatre" in the years 1905–1907, from plans by German theatre architect Carl Moritz. In the interwar period from 1922 to 1939 it was known as the "Polish Theatre".

== Gallery ==
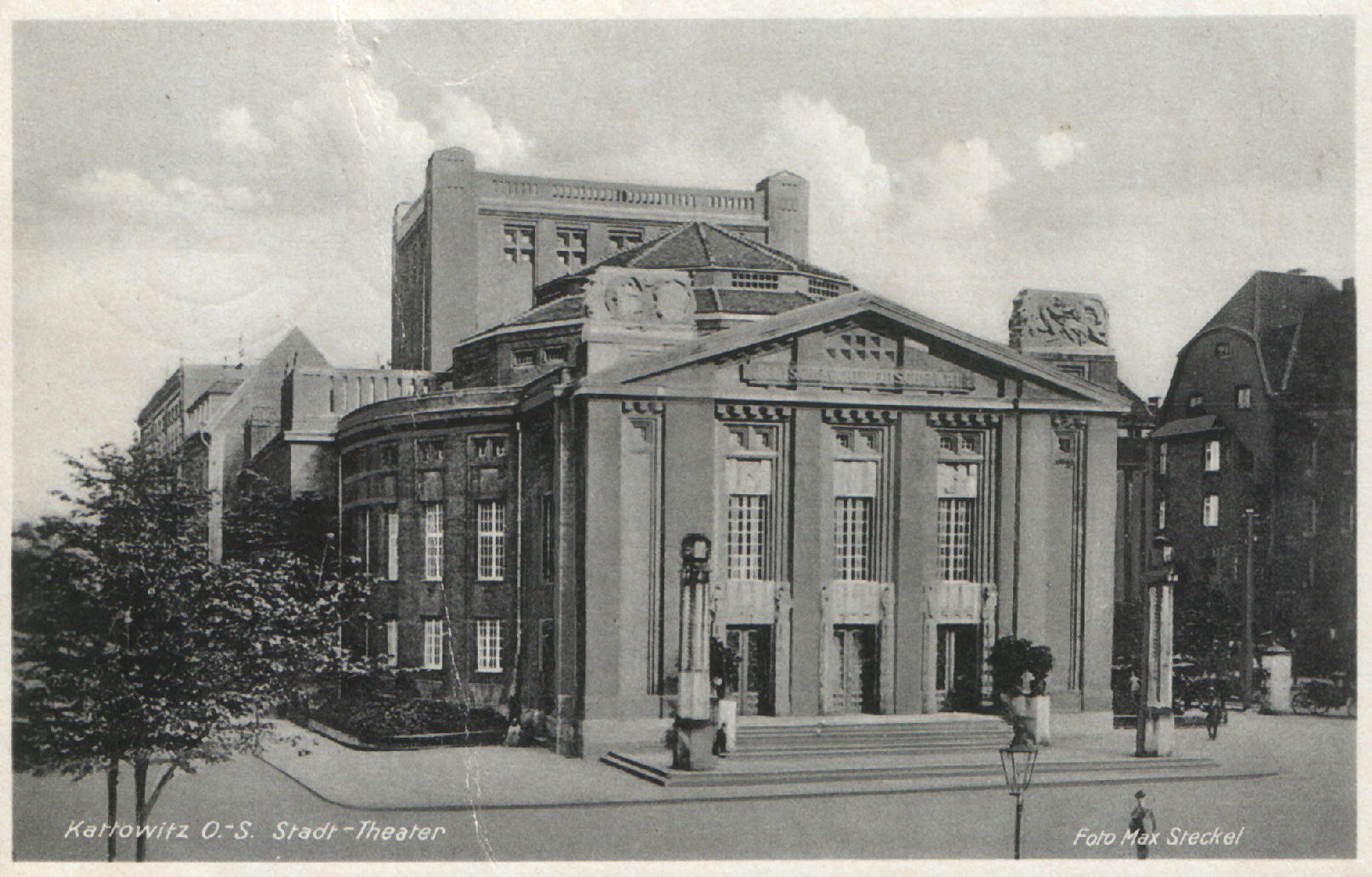
Silesian Theatre before Second World War

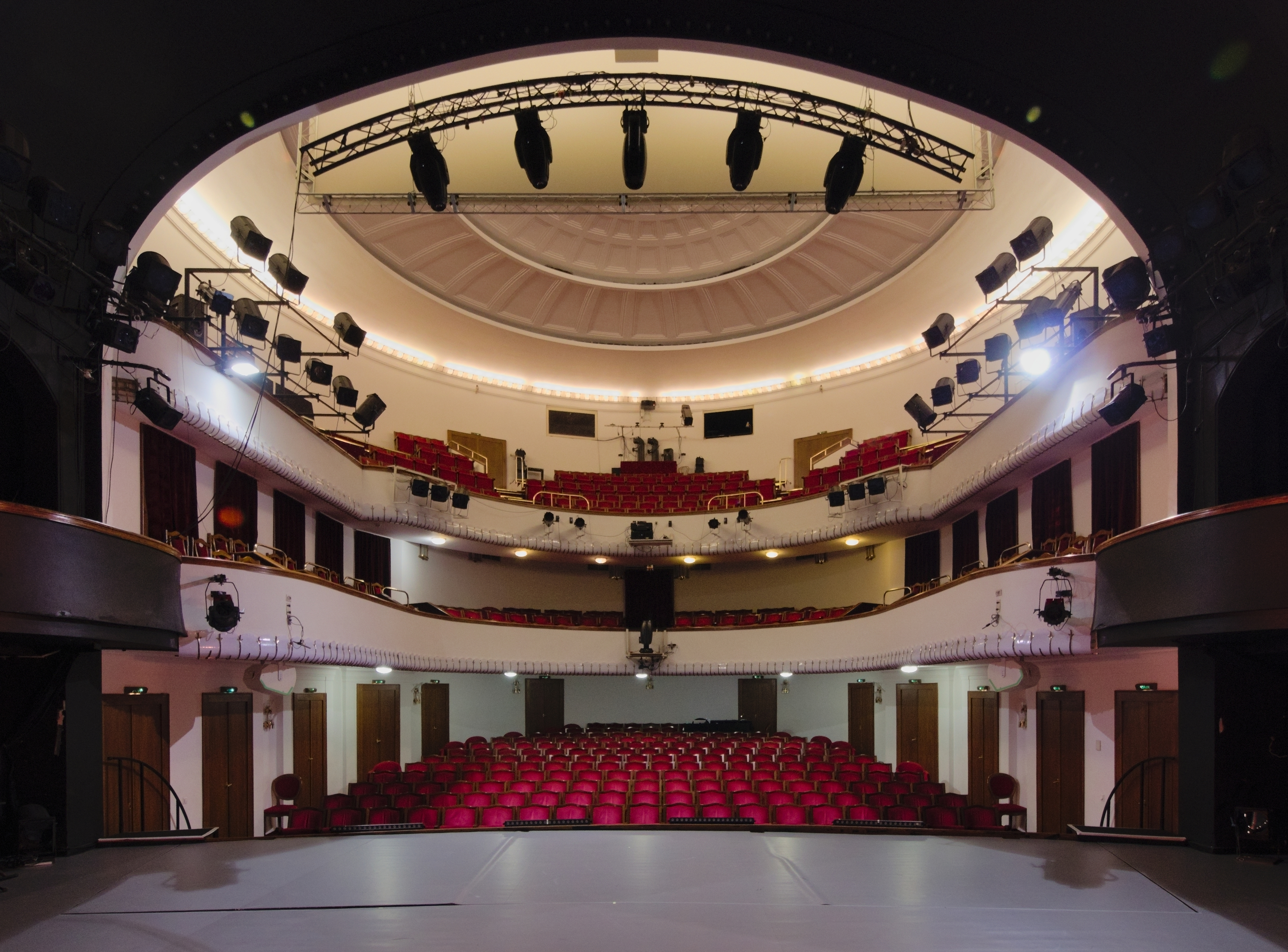
Auditorium (2022)

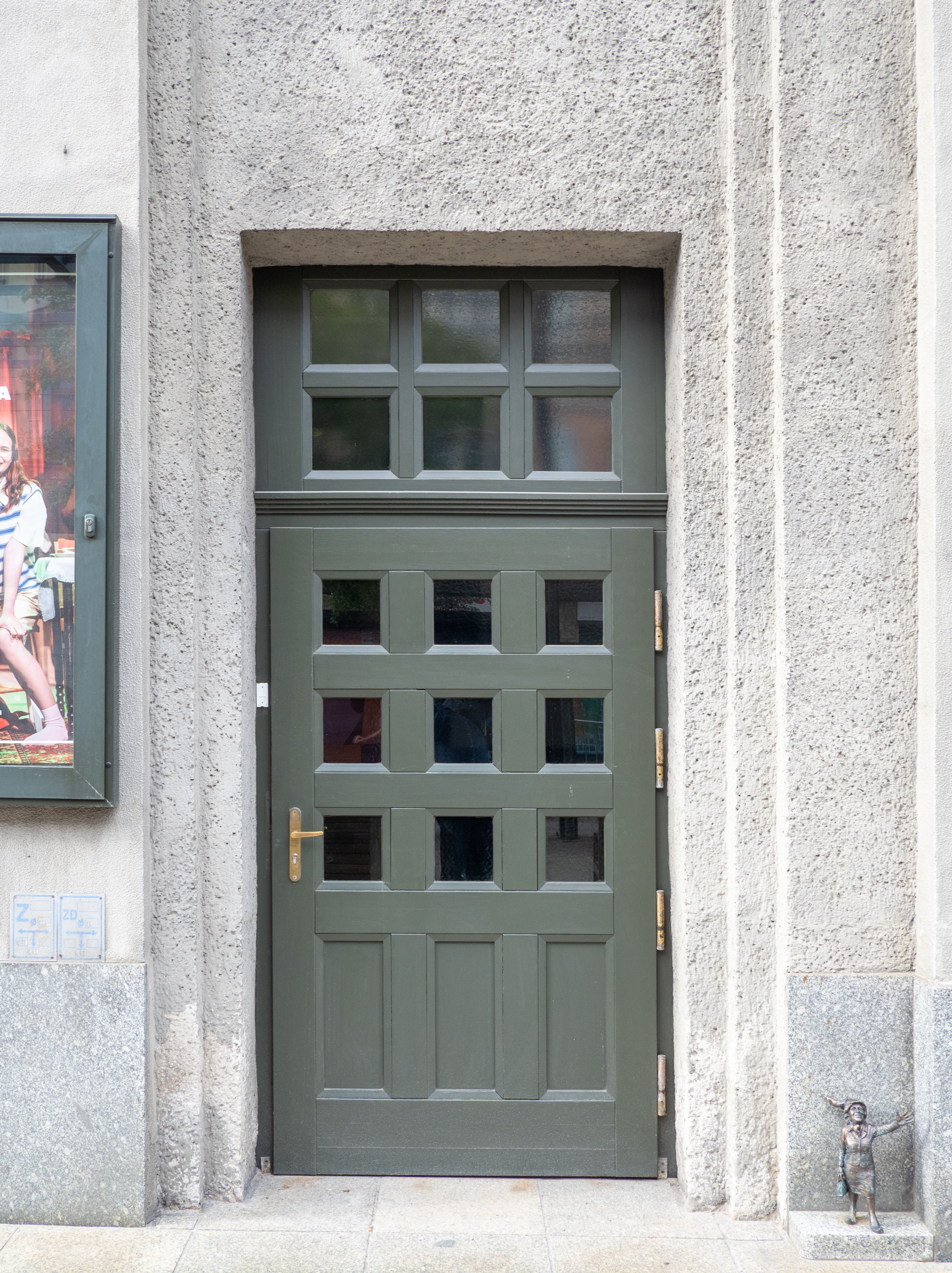
Door on Warszawska Street, with a tiny statue of Krystyna Bochenek
