= Janusz Kazimierz Krzyżewski =

Polish politician

Marshal of Podlaskie Voivodeship
- In office 30 November 2002 – 20 February 2007
- Preceded by: Sławomir Zgrzywa
- Succeeded by: Dariusz Piontkowski

Personal details
- Born: 10 September 1949 (age 77) Bakałarzewo, Polish People's Republic
- Citizenship: Poland
- Party: Democratic Left Alliance
- Other political affiliations: Polish United Workers' Party (until 1990)
- Education: Main School of Planning and Statistics
- Occupation: Economist, politician

Janusz Kazimierz Krzyżewski (born September 10, 1949, in Bakałarzewo) is Polish politician, activist of the Polish United Workers' Party, local government official, who served as Marshal of the Podlaskie Voivodeship from 2002 to 2007.

== Biography ==
He graduated in economics from the Main School of Planning and Statistics, and also began doctoral studies. He was employed in industrial enterprises (construction materials plants in Niegocin), then became a full-time employee of the Polish United Workers' Party, among others he was the First Secretary of the City Committee in Giżycko.

From 1975 he worked in the party apparatus in Suwałki, he was deputy head and head of the Economic Department of the Suwałki Voivodeship Committee of the PZPR (1975–1978), First Secretary of the City Committee (1978–1981) and head of the Socio-Economic Department of the Provincial Committee (since 1981). He was the last to hold the position of First Secretary of the PZPR Voivodeship Committee of Suwałki. In the 1990s, he started his own business.

He was one of the founders of the Social Democracy of the Republic of Poland and the Democratic Left Alliance in the region. From 1998 to 2010, he continuously sat on the Podlaskie Voivodeship Sejmik. After the local elections of 2002, he took over the position of the Voivodeship marshal. He held it until 20 February 2007, i.e. until the dissolution of the regional assembly elected in 2006 and the appointment of Jarosław Schabieński as the person acting as the local government body of the Podlaskie Voivodeship. In the same year, he became the president of the board of the Municipal Economy Enterprise in Suwałki.

In 2010, he was found guilty of unreliable completion of a property declaration (failure to disclose debts), and the criminal proceedings against him were conditionally discontinued. As a result, he could not run in the next local elections. In 2014, he ran for the regional council again, but did not win a seat.
