= Dorota Simonides =

Polish folklorist and politician (born 1928)

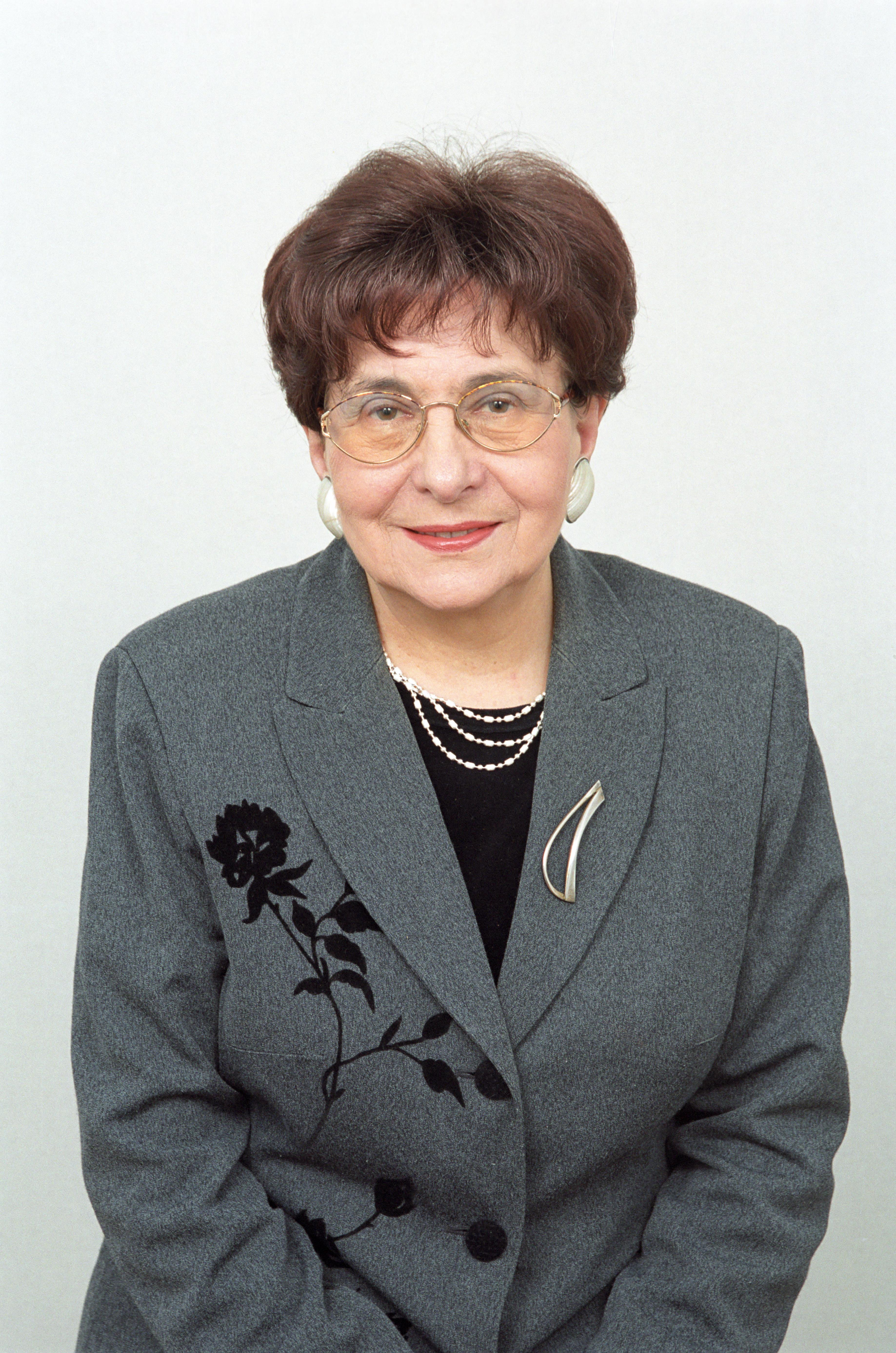

Member of the 8th Sejm of the Polish People's Republic
- In office 2 April 1980 – 31 July 1985

Personal details
- Born: 19 November 1928 (age 97) Nikiszowiec, Katowice, Second Polish Republic
- Party: Alliance of Democrats
- Education: University of Breslau
- Occupation: Ethnologist, folklorist, academic lecturer, writer and politician, member of the Polish Ethnological Society
- Awards: Order of Polonia Restituta; Order of Merit of the Federal Republic of Germany; Herder Prize; Oskar Kolberg Prize

Dorota Elżbieta Simonides (born 19 November 1928) is a Polish ethnologist, folklorist, academic lecturer, writer and politician. As a folklorist, she was president of the Polish Ethnological Society from 1999 to 2005 and worked at the Adam Mickiewicz University in Poznań, the University of Wrocław and the University of Opole. As a politician, she was elected as a member of parliament to the 8th term of the Sejm of People's Republic of Poland and was also vice-president of the Organization for Security and Cooperation in Europe (OSCE) council in Warsaw.

== Early life and education ==
Simonides was born on 19 November 1928 in Nikiszowiec, Katowice, Second Polish Republic.

Simonides was inspired to study ethnography after a team from Jagiellonian University visited her high school distributing surveys to collect Silesian customs and beliefs. She studied at the Faculty of Humanities of the University of Breslau (now the University of Wrocław), graduating in 1955. On 10 March 2008, she was awarded an honorary doctorate by the University of Opole.

== Career ==
=== Folklore ===
Simonides worked at the Adam Mickiewicz University in Poznań then became an associate professor, then full professor, at the University of Wrocław. For 30 years, she worked at the University of Opole, where she was head of the Department of Folklore.

During field research in the 1950s and 1960s, villagers were reluctant to talk to Simonides about local folk culture or fairy tales, so she began conversations by saying that she was developing a chronicle of the village. The Security Service were also suspicious of Simonides and other researchers, suspected them of urging people not to join the state farms rather than engaging in folklore research. She lost her library (5,000 volumes) during the 1997 Central European flood.

Simonides was awarded the Oskar Kolberg Prize in 1998, which is the oldest and the most important Polish distinction for merit to folk culture.

In 2007, the Polskie Towarzystwo Ludoznawcze [pl] (Polish Ethnological Society) featured Simonides in their book about Upper Silesian cultural heritage and notable folk collectors. She was president of the Polish Ethnological Society from 1999 to 2005.

In 2025, the Voivodeship Public Library in Opole published Simonides' book Księgę Bajek Opolskich (Book of Opole Fairy Tales), which contains 400 fairy tales that were collected with her students during field research.

Simonides is also an encyclopaedist and developed the entries related to literature in Silesia in the Literatura polska Przewodnik encyklopedyczny [pl] (Polish literary encyclopedia).

=== Politics ===
During the People's Republic of Poland, Simonides joined the small non-Marxist "satellite party" Alliance of Democrats (Polish: Stronnictwo Demokratyczne, SD). She was elected as a member of parliament to the 8th term of the Sejm of People's Republic of Poland in 1980–1985. She was one of only a few MPs who did not vote in favour of martial law in 1981 and the criminalisation of the trade union Solidarity in 1984. She had joined Solidarity in 1980.

Simonides returned to policitcs in 1990, successfully contesting the Senate by-election for the Opole Constituency in February 1990. She sat as a Senator in the Senate of Poland until 2005. She did not run for re-election in the elections in 2005. From 1997, she chaired and was vice president of the Organization for Security and Cooperation in Europe (OSCE) council in Warsaw.

Simonides was appointed to the Order Odrodzenia Polski (Order of Polonia Restituta), as: Gold Cross of Merit (1976), Knight's Cross (1979), Officer (1990) and Commander (2013). She was awarded the Medal of the 30th anniversary of the People's Republic of Poland. In 2020, she was awarded the Lux ex Silesia award.

Simonides has also been awarded the Grand Cross of the Order of Merit of the Federal Republic of Germany (the highest German distinction awarded to foreigners), for her contribution to Polish-German reconciliation.
