= Sławomir Zgrzywa =

Polish politician

Marshal of Podlaskie Voivodeship
- In office 1 January 1999 – 30 November 2002
- Preceded by: Position established
- Succeeded by: Janusz Kazimierz Krzyżewski

Voivode of Łomża Voivodeship
- In office 1997–1998
- Preceded by: Mieczysław Bagiński
- Succeeded by: Position abolished

Personal details
- Born: 8 April 1962 (age 64) Łomża, Polish People's Republic
- Citizenship: Poland
- Party: Solidarity Electoral Action
- Other political affiliations: Social Movement; Civic Platform
- Education: Białystok branch of the University of Warsaw
- Occupation: Teacher, politician
- Awards: Cross of Merit

Sławomir Zgrzywa (born April 8, 1962 in Łomża) is a Polish politician, local government official, historian who served in 1997–1998 as the last Voivode of Łomża Voivodeship and in 1999–2002 as the first Marshal of the Podlaskie Voivodeship.

== Biography ==
He graduated from the 1st Tadeusz Kościuszko General Secondary School in Łomża, then studied history at the Faculty of Humanities of the Białystok branch of the University of Warsaw.

He was employed as a teacher in a primary school, later he worked in the State Monuments Service in Łomża. In 1997–1998 he held the position of the Voivode of Łomża Voivodeship (the last in the history of this voivodeship). From 1999 to 2002 he served as first Marshal of the Podlaskie Voivodeship. From 1998 to 2006 he also sat on the Podlaskie Voivodeship Sejmik of the 1st and 2nd term, and was not re-elected in subsequent local elections. He was employed at the Provincial Office for the Protection of Monuments as a senior inspector.

Associated with the Solidarity Electoral Action, he was a member of the Social Movement, and from 2002 to 2014 he was active in the Civic Platform (he was elected to the regional authorities of this party). He ran in the Senate by-elections in 2003. In 2014, he also ran unsuccessfully for president and councilor of Łomża on behalf of the Łomża Our City committee. He became the treasurer of the Łomża Wagów Scientific Society.

In 2021, he was awarded the Silver Cross of Merit.
