= Koniecki Małe =

- Village
- Location within Poland
- Coordinates: 53°34′12″N 22°15′24″E
- Country: Poland
- Voivodeship: Podlaskie
- County: Grajewo
- Gmina: Szczuczyn

Koniecki Małe [kɔˈɲɛt͡ski ˈmawɛ] is a village in the administrative district of Gmina Szczuczyn, within Grajewo County, Podlaskie Voivodeship, in north-eastern Poland.
