= Henryk Stokłosa =

Polish entrepreneur and politician

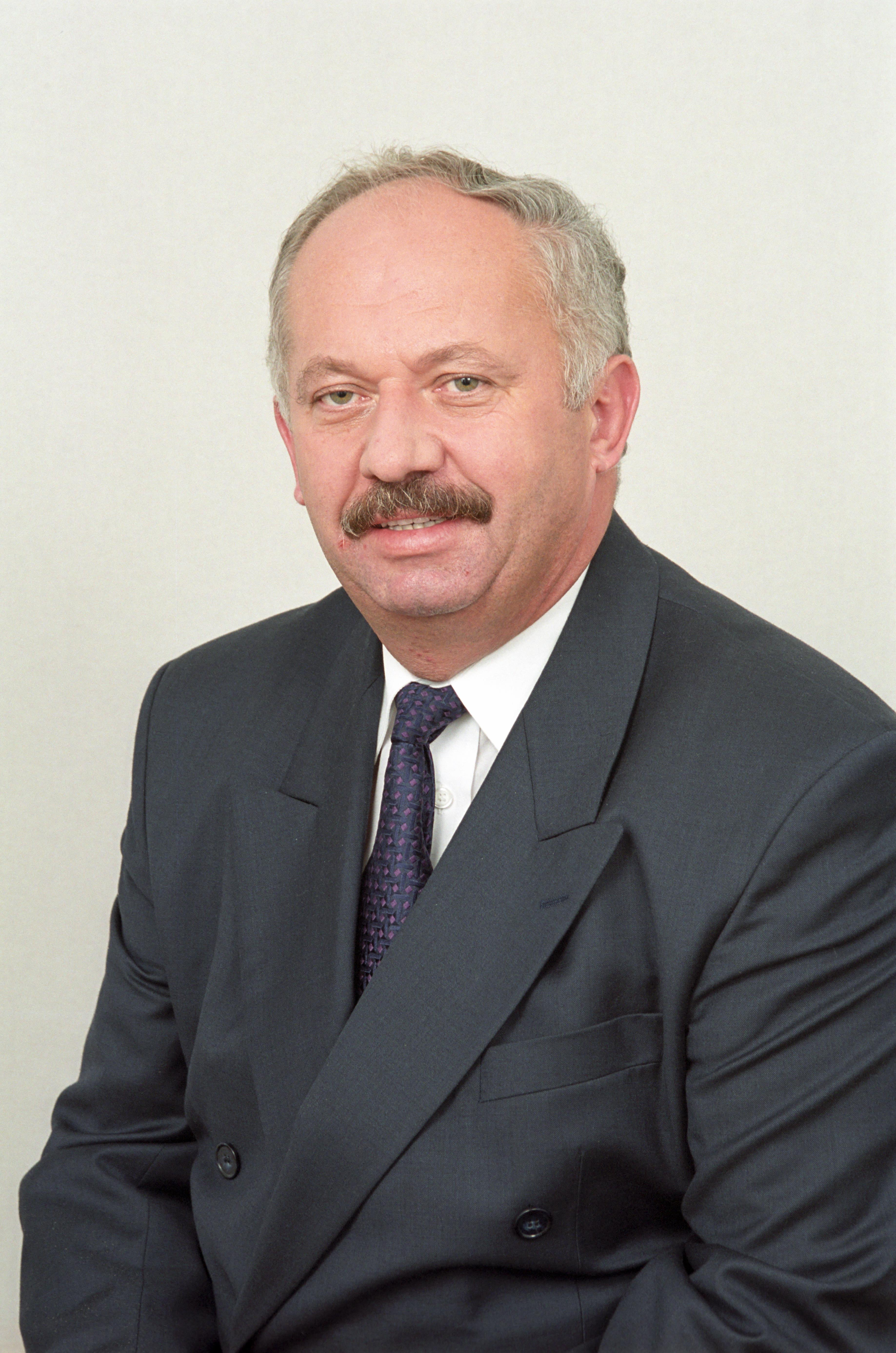

Member of the Senate
- In office 1989–2005
- Constituency: no. 37
- In office 2011–2011
- Constituency: no. 37

Member of the Piła County Council
- In office 2014–2024
- Constituency: no. 6

Personal details
- Born: 4 January 1949 (age 77) Lipiny, Poland
- Party: Independent
- Education: University of Life Sciences in Poznań
- Occupation: Entrepreneur, politician
- Awards: Silver Cross of Merit

Henryk Tadeusz Stokłosa (born 4 January 1949 in Lipiny) is a Polish entrepreneur, politician and local government official, who served as a senator of the Senate of Poland in the 1st (1989—1991), 2nd (1991—1993), 3rd (1993—1997), 4th (1997—2001), 5th (2001—2005), and 7th (2007—2011, but only from 2011 via by-election) terms. He also served as a member of the Piła County Council from 2014 to 2024.

== Biography ==
=== Education and professional career ===
In 1968, Stokłosa graduated from a technical automotive school in Trzcianka, and then studied at the Faculty of Agriculture (1980) and the Faculty of Animal Science (1982) of the Agricultural University of Poznań.

During his studies, he worked at the State Machinery Centre in Margonin. In 1971, he then moved to the tourism industry. From 1976 to 1981 he was the director of the Noteć Provincial Tourism Enterprise in Piła. In 1980, he founded the craft enterprise for the utilisation of agricultural and livestock waste Farmutil H.S. in Śmiłowo.

He developed his business activities, running a group of enterprises that mainly included various processing plants in the agrifood industry, a local press publisher and retail chains (Stokłosa and Stogrosz), employing several thousand people and becoming one of the largest employers in the former Piła Voivodeship. In 2005, with assets valued at 950 million złoty, he ranked approximately 15th on the list of the wealthiest Poles published by the weekly Wprost. He served as vice-president of the Piła Land Aero Club.

=== Political career ===
In the mid-1970s, he became a member of the Polish United Workers' Party, from which he was expelled in 1982. In 1989, he ran an expensive election campaign in the Piła Voivodeship ahead of the elections to the Senate of Poland. In those elections he obtained a Senate mandate, defeating the candidate of the Solidarity Citizens' Committee Piotr Baumgart, as well as the Piła voivode Zbigniew Rosiński, in the second round. In the 1st term Senate he was the only senator who won despite not being supported by Solidarity. He was re-elected as an independent candidate in the Piła Voivodeship and the Piła constituency in the 1991, 1993, 1997 and 2001 elections. In the 2005 parliamentary elections, he was not re-elected.

From 1990 to 2001 he also sat on the council of the Kaczory gmina. In 2011, running from his own voters' electoral committee, he was elected senator in the Piła constituency in a by-election. He took the oath of office on 2 March 2011. In the parliamentary elections of the same year he did not seek re-election. He ran in the 2014 and 2018 local elections, obtaining a mandate in the Piła County Council. He did not seek re-election, and thus did not run in the 2024 elections.

=== Criminal proceedings ===
In January 2007 a European Arrest Warrant was issued against Stokłosa in connection with suspicions of corruption offences. In November 2007, Henryk Stokłosa was detained on the basis of the European Arrest Warrant near Hamburg, and was transferred to Poland the next month.

In December 2008, the Court of Appeal in Poznań overturned the decision of the District Court in Poznań to extend the period of pre-trial detention of Henryk Stokłosa, simultaneously applying a bail of 3 million złoty, confiscation of his passport and a ban on leaving the country as preventive measures.

In February 2013, the District Court in Poznań acquitted Stokłosa of some charges (including the so-called ecological thread, which was later the subject of a cassation appeal and the quashing of the judgment by the Supreme Court). At the same time, the court sentenced Stokłosa at first instance to a total of eight years' imprisonment and a fine of 600,000 złoty. In March 2014, the Court of Appeal in Poznań quashed the conviction in part and referred the case for re-examination. The proceedings regarding the corruption charges were discontinued in 2015 due to the statute of limitations.

In the repeated trial, Henryk Stokłosa was sentenced by the District Court in Poznań to 1 year and 3 months' imprisonment for one corruption offence and acquitted of the remaining acts. After deducting the period of pre-trial detention, approximately 20 days of the sentence remained to be served.

== Awards and decorations ==
He was awarded, among others, the Silver Cross of Merit.

== Private life ==
He is the son of a farmer who served in the Polish army in the German invasion of Poland. He is married to Anna; they have three sons.

== Election history ==
Electoral history of Henryk Stokłosa
Year	Office	C.	Party	Votes		Result	Ref.
Year	Office	C.	Party	Total	%	Result	Ref.
1989	Senate	no. 37	Independent	95,059	49.47	Won	
1991	Senate	no. 37	Independent	45,859	17.39	Held	
1993	Senate	no. 37	Independent	84,740	25.71	Held	
1997	Senate	no. 37	Independent	58,005	20.13	Held	
2001	Senate	no. 37	Independent	113,139	42.97	Held	
2005	Senate	no. 37	Independent	38,033	39.53	Lost	
2011 (by-election)	Senate	no. 37	Independent	15,057	39.90	Won	
2014	Piła County Council		Independent	1,085	7.86	Won	
2018	Piła County Council		Independent	1,042	15.67	Held	
