= Krystyna Bochenek =

Polish journalist and politician (1953–2010)

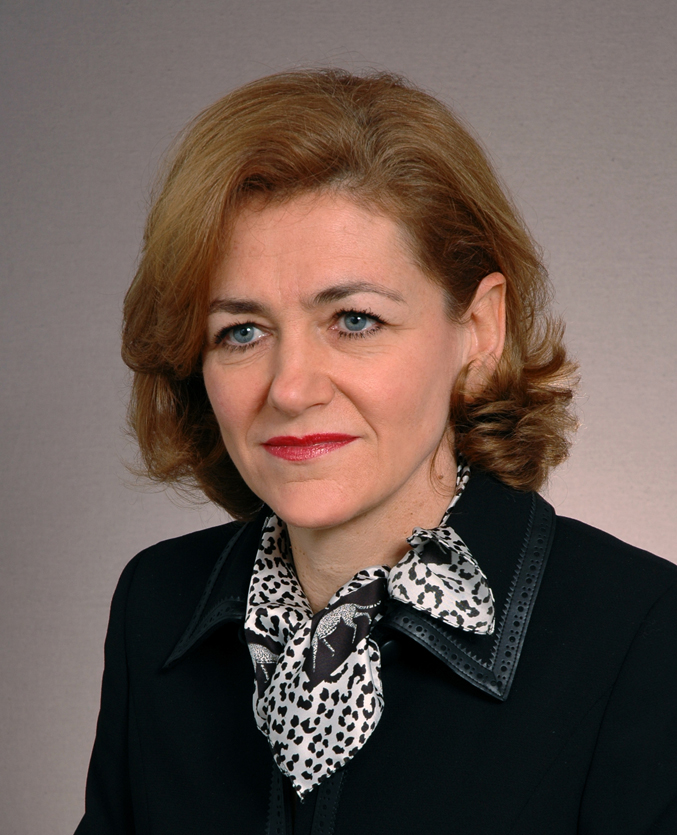
- Senate portrait, 2005

Deputy Marshal of the Senate of the Republic of Poland
- In office 5 November 2007 – 10 April 2010
- Preceded by: Marek Aleksander Ziółkowski
- Succeeded by: Zbigniew Romaszewski

Personal details
- Born: Krystyna Maria Neuman; 30 June 1953 Stalinogród, Polish People's Republic
- Died: 10 April 2010 (aged 56) Smolensk, Russia
- Resting place: Sienkiewicz Street cemetery
- Party: Civic Platform
- Spouse: Andrzej Bochenek
- Children: Tomasz, Magdalena
- Education: Silesian University

Krystyna Maria Bochenek (née Neuman) (30 June 1953 – 10 April 2010) was a Polish journalist, politician and Vice-Marshal of the Senate of the Republic of Poland representing Civic Platform (Platforma Obywatelska). She died in office on board the Polish presidential jet in the April 2010 Smolensk air disaster, along with the President of Poland.

== Biography ==
Bochenek was born in Stalinogród, and graduated from a high school there, proceeding to study at the University of Silesia. In 1976, she became a journalist for Polish Radio Katowice. For many years, she worked with the press and television. She was responsible for the popularization of the culture of the Polish language and the popularization of health. She organized events abroad promoting the Polish language. Besides that, she also prepared nearly a thousand hours of programming on health, including Medical Magazine on radio. She co-wrote the TV program A to Health.

She was part of the Polish Language Council at the Presidium of the Polish Academy of Sciences (including the President of the Language in the Media Commission). She initiated the resolution on the establishment by the Senate of 2006 as the Year of the Polish Language. She organized scientific conferences, i.e. Polish language legislation, Polish language politicians at the beginning of the 21st century, as well as Polish Language Festival 2006, which took place under the patronage of the Marshal of the Senate Bogdan Borusewicz, with 5,000 people participating.

She was the head of the Silesian Scholarship Fund. She served as Vice-President of the Programme Council in TVP Polonia.

In cooperation with Silesian newsrooms, she led a campaign raising awareness for the prevention of breast cancer in women under the name "Pink Ribbon". She has helped many social causes including the Great Orchestra of Christmas Charity, the reconstruction of the burnt Silesian Opera building, the Silesian Theatre and the Mining Families Foundation.

As a non-partisan candidate of the Katowice district, on 26 September 2004, she won the by-election for the Senate on behalf of the Freedom Union. She won again as a senator in 2005, with 53.28% of the votes in the district, this time for the Civic Platform. In the 2007 parliamentary elections, she was given a mandate for a third time with 255 792 votes. On 5 November of the same year, she was appointed Deputy Speaker of the Senate for her seventh term. During this time, she was Vice-President of the Parliamentary Group for Cooperation with NGOs.

== Death ==
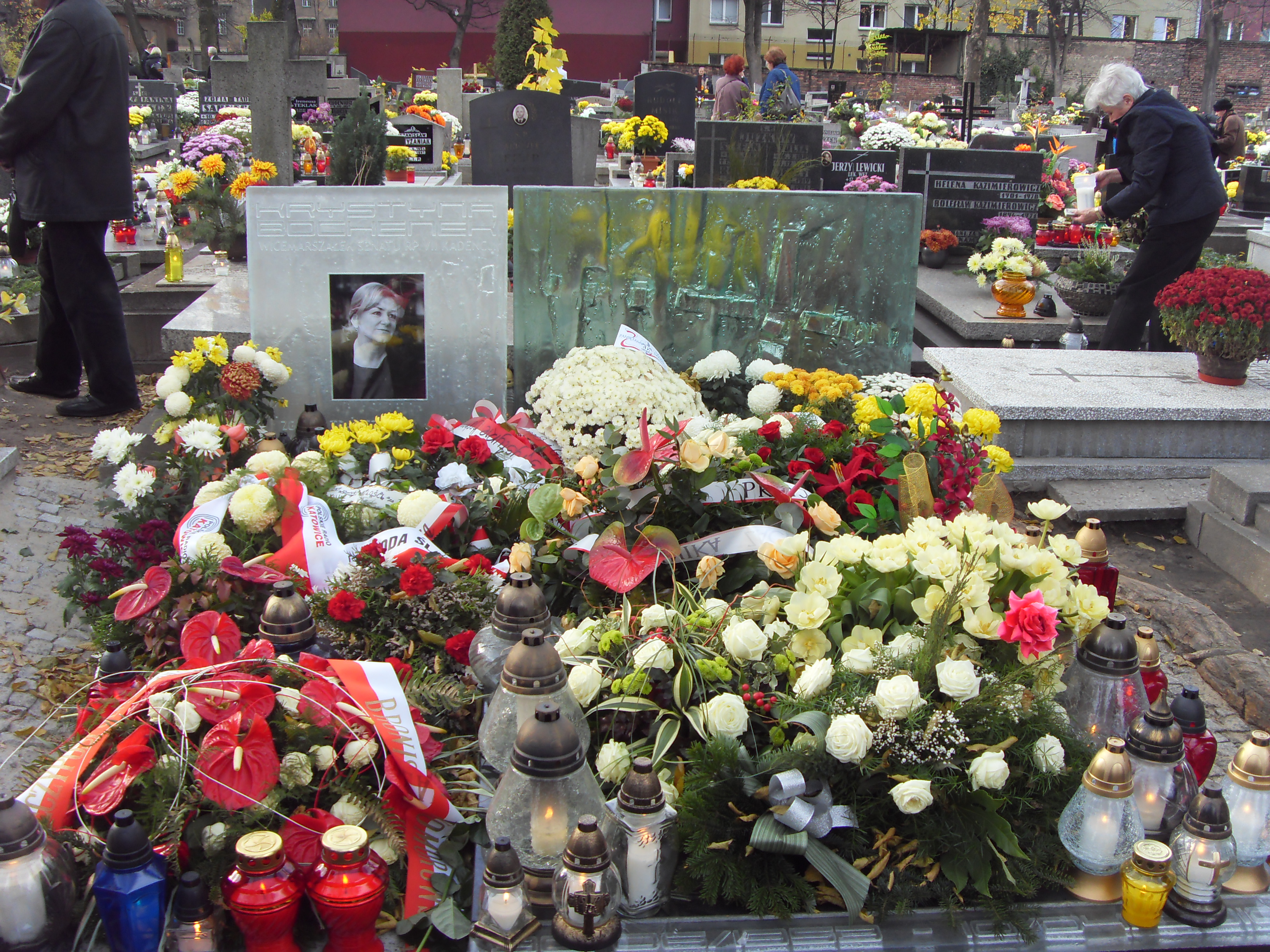
Grave of Krystyna Bochenek at the Sienkiewicz Street cemetery in Katowice

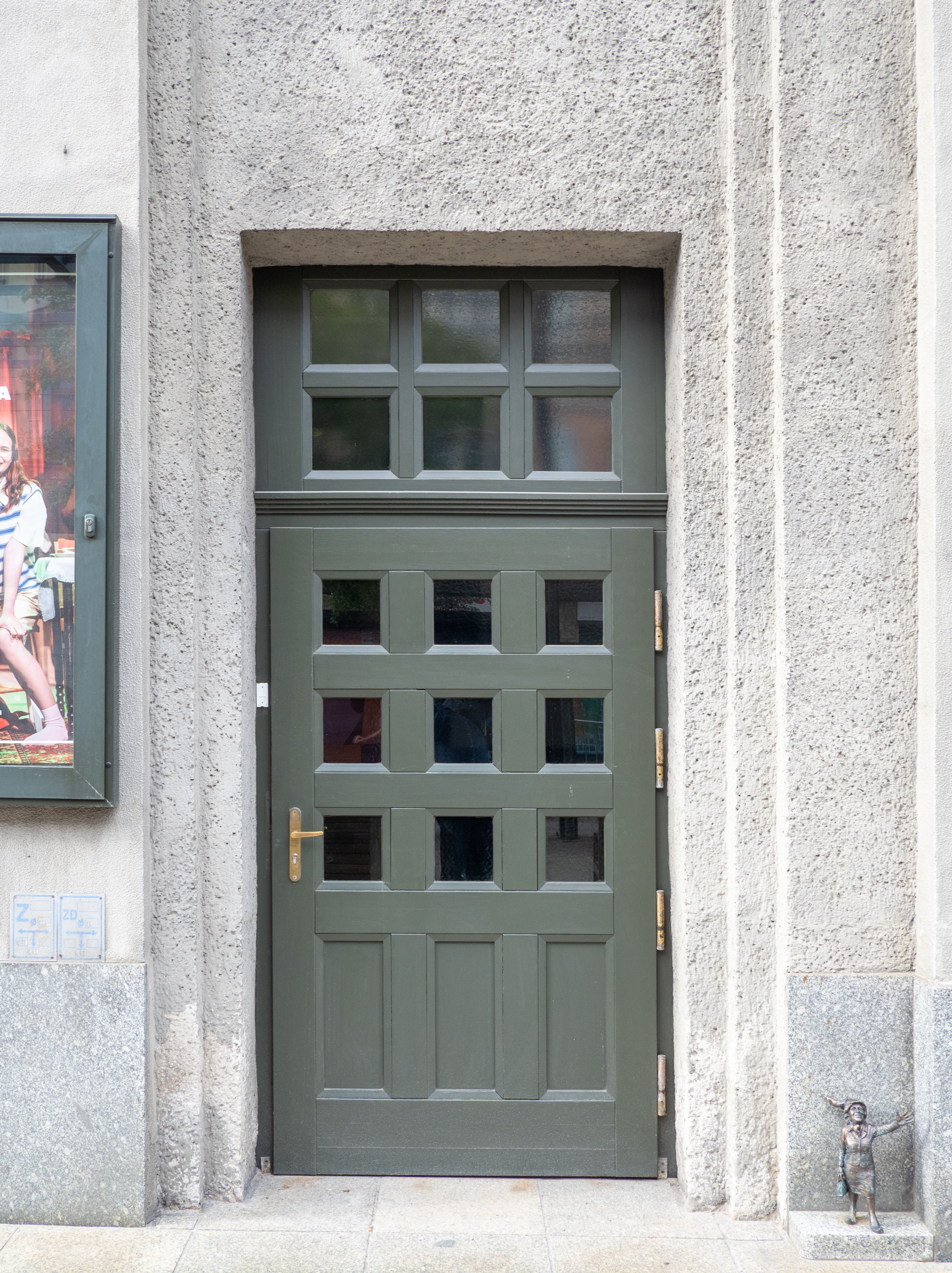
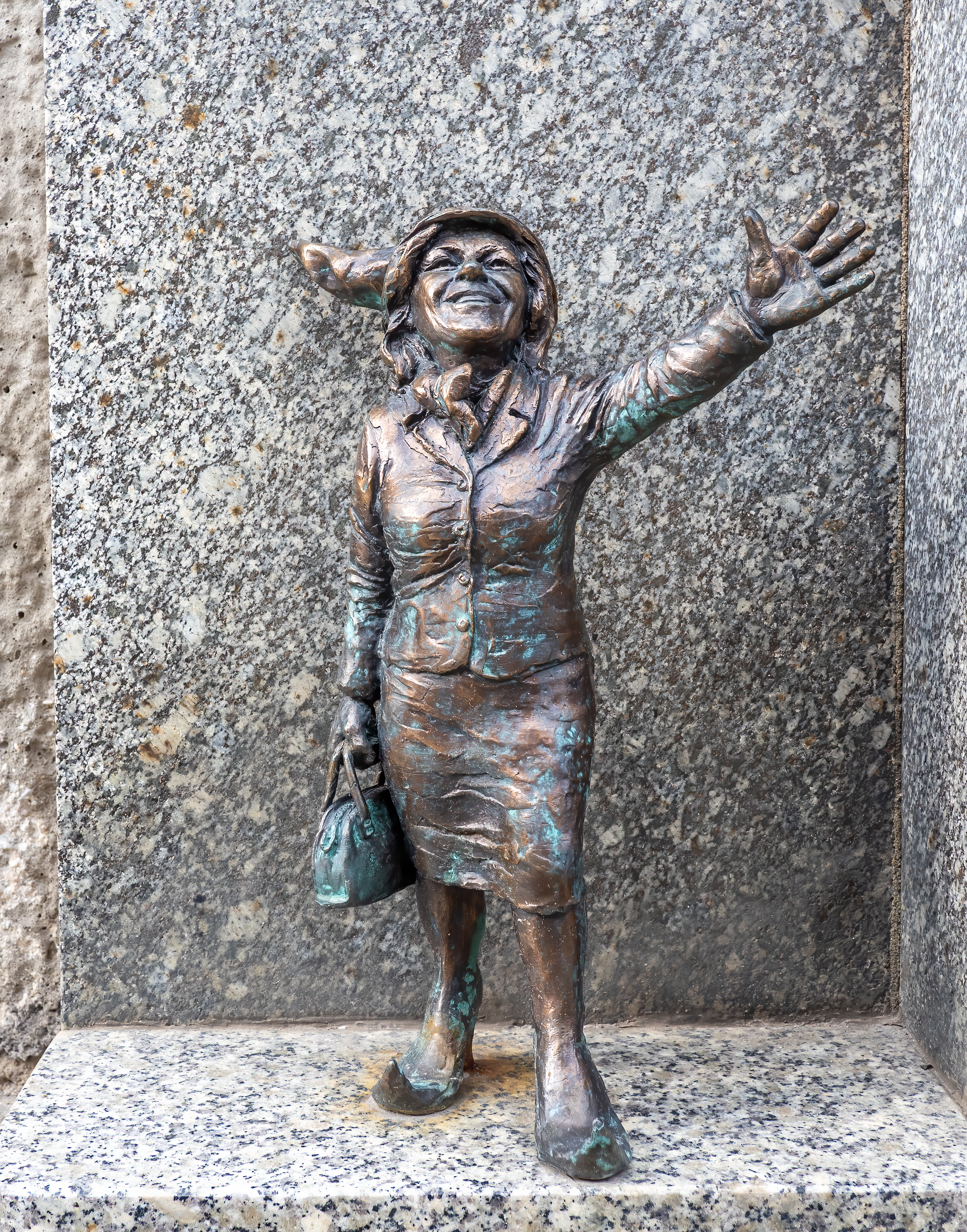
Small statue of Bochenek at the Silesian Theater

Bochenek was listed on the flight manifest of the Tupolev Tu-154 of the 36th Special Aviation Regiment carrying the President of Poland Lech Kaczyński, who was on his way to the 70th anniversary memorial of the Katyn massacre, which crashed near Smolensk-North airport near Pechersk near Smolensk, Russia, on 10 April 2010, killing all aboard.

On 22 April 2010, she was buried in the cemetery on Sienkiewicza Street in Katowice.

== Honours and awards ==
Commander's Cross with Star of the Order of Polonia Restituta (April 2010)
