= Janina Fetlińska =

Polish politician (1952–2010)

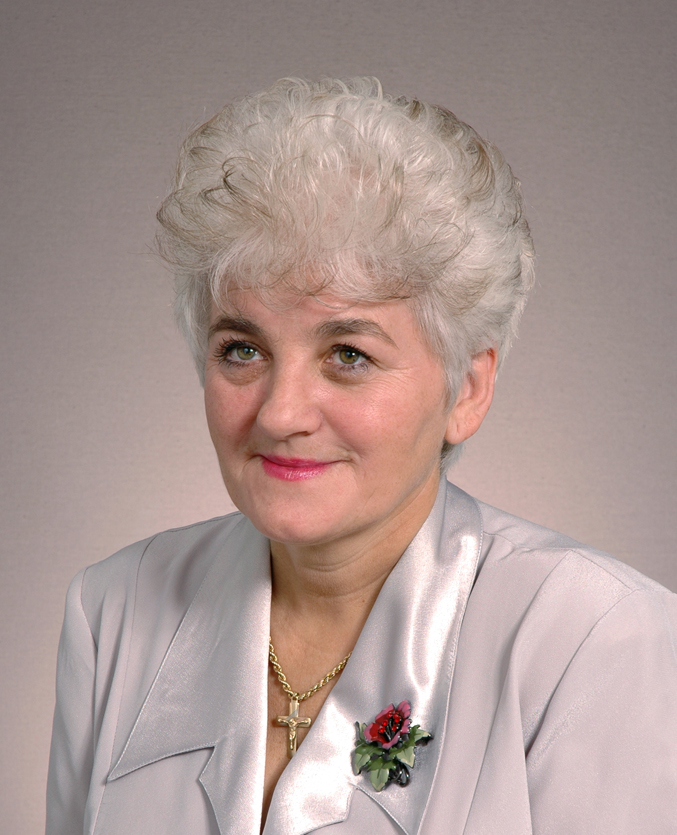
- Janina Fetlińska in 2005

Member of the Senate of Poland
- In office 2005 – 2010
- Succeeded by: Michał Boszko
- Constituency: 15 Płock

Personal details
- Born: 14 June 1952 Tuligłowy, Poland
- Died: 10 April 2010 (aged 57) near Smolensk, Russia
- Party: Law and Justice

Janina Fetlińska (14 June 1952 in Tuligłowy – 10 April 2010) was a member of the Polish Senate representing the Law and Justice party, a nurse.

She was listed on the flight manifest of the Tupolev Tu-154 of the 36th Special Aviation Regiment carrying the President of Poland Lech Kaczyński which crashed near Smolensk-North airport near Pechersk near Smolensk, Russia, on 10 April 2010, killing all aboard.

On 16 April 2010 she was posthumously awarded the Commander's Cross of the Order of Polonia Restituta. On 17 April 2010 she received the Honorary Cross of the Scouting Association of the Republic.
