= Alicja Zając =

Polish politician (born 1953)

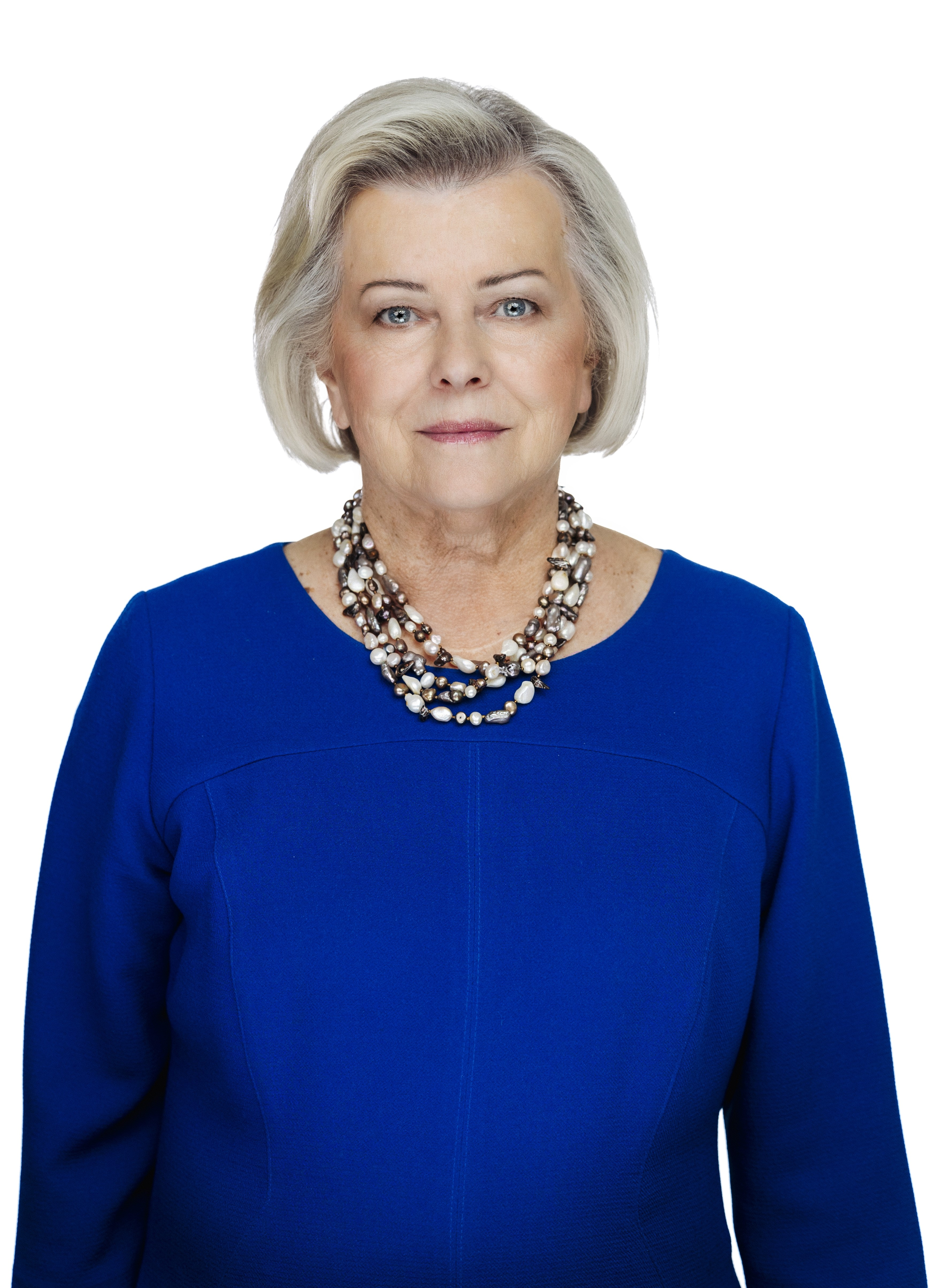

Member of the Senate of Poland

Personal details
- Born: 26 June 1953 (age 72)

Alicja Maria Zając (born 26 June 1953) is a Polish politician. She was elected to the Senate of Poland (10th term) representing the constituency of Krosno.
