= Janusz Kubicki =

Polish politician (born 1969)

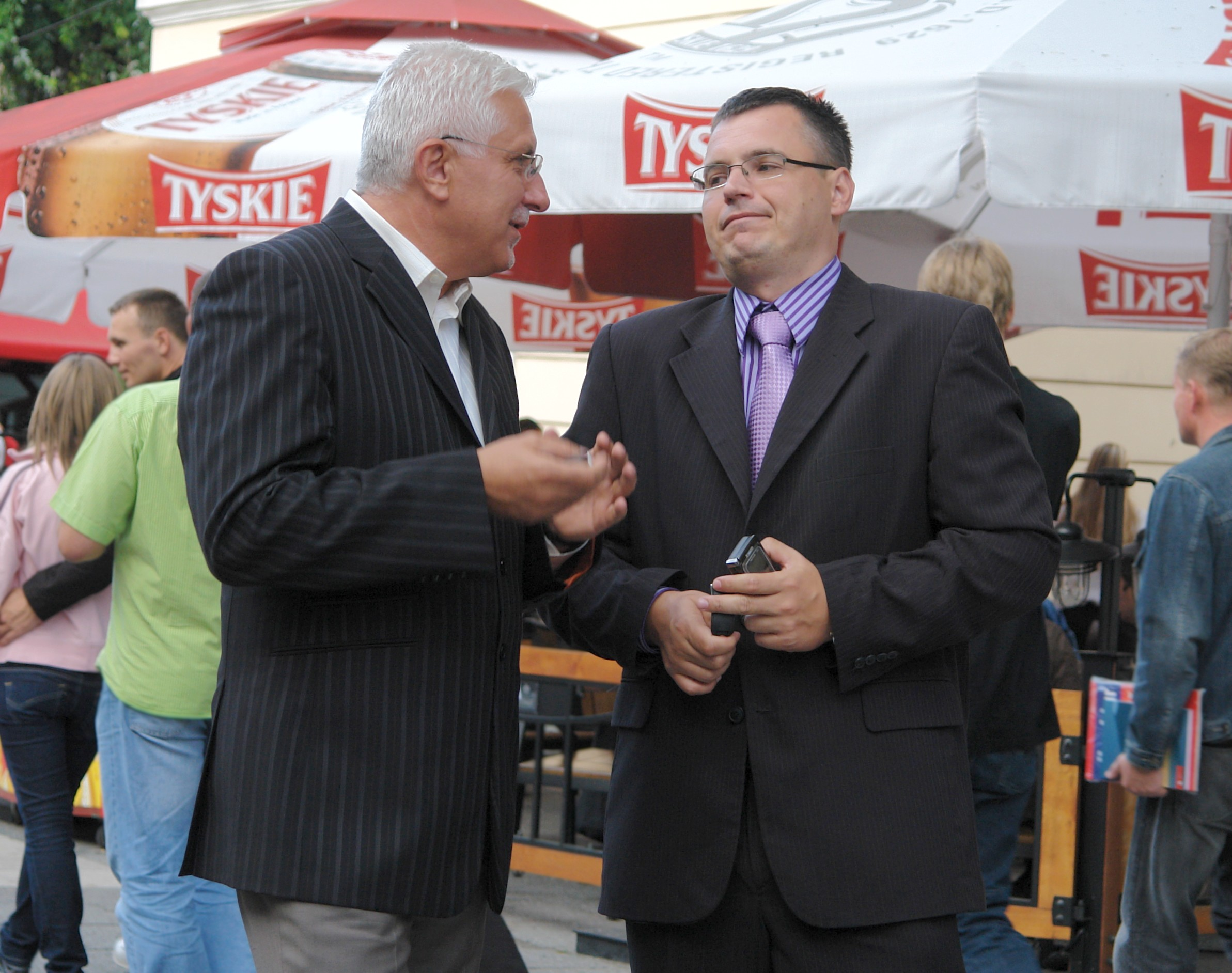
- Janusz Kubicki (right)

Mayor of Zielona Góra
- In office 2006–2024
- Preceded by: Bożena Ronowicz
- Succeeded by: Marcin Pabierowski

Personal details
- Born: 31 December 1969 (age 56) Szprotawa, Poland
- Party: Democratic Left Alliance
- Spouse: Agata Kubicka
- Profession: manager

Janusz Kubicki (born 31 December 1969 in Szprotawa, Poland) is a Polish politician who has been the Mayor (pol. Prezydent) of Zielona Góra from 2006 to 2024. In the April 2024 municipal elections, he ran for the fifth consecutive term. He lost in the second round, receiving 42,54% of the votes.

Agata's husband, the father of two sons, Wojciech and Piotr.
