= Ewa Zajączkowska-Hernik =

Polish politician

Ewa Zajączkowska-Hernik MEP
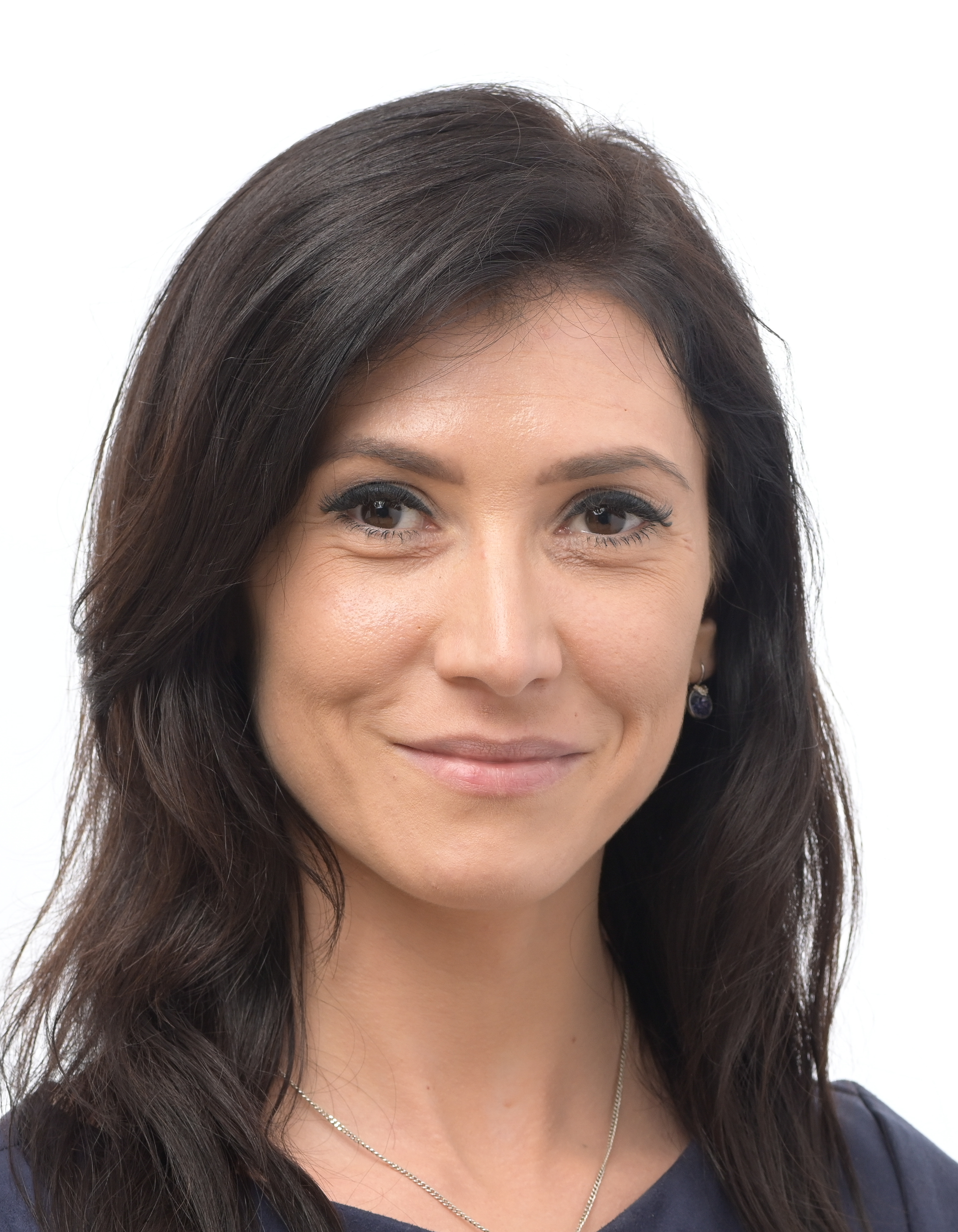
- Official portrait, 2024

Member of the European Parliament for Warsaw
- Incumbent
- Assumed office 16 July 2024

Personal details
- Born: Ewa Zajączkowska; 20 January 1990 (age 36) Radom, Poland
- Party: KWiN (since 2023); PfE (since 2026)
- Other political affiliations: KNP (2014–2015); NN (2015; 2023–2026); ESN (2024–2026)
- Spouse: Marcin Hernik
- Education: Maria Curie-Skłodowska University

Ewa Zajączkowska-Hernik (born 20 January 1990) is a Polish right-wing politician and journalist, serving as a Member of the European Parliament for the tenth term despite not being elected one of its 14 vice-presidents by the 2024 Bureau (positioned 17th after two rounds of voting).

== Biography ==
In the past, she was the president of the youth section of KORWiN Radom and the Freedom-Patriotic Movement Association. From 2009 to 2013, she studied history at the Maria Curie-Skłodowska University in Lublin. Professionally, she is a history teacher. Since 2014, she has been associated with Janusz Korwin-Mikke's party in Radom. Between 2016 and 2023, she worked in the media, as a journalist for the wSensie.pl website and the światrolnika.info portal, covering political, economic, and agricultural topics. Since December 2023, she has been the spokesperson for the Confederation Liberty and Independence. In 2024, she was elected as a Member of the European Parliament in the tenth term, receiving 102,569 votes. She joined the Europe of Sovereign Nations Group. In the European Parliament, she sat on the Committee on Civil Liberties, Justice and Home Affairs.

== Political Positions and Controversies ==
In early July 2026, Ewa Zajączkowska-Hernik sharply criticized Ukraine’s glorification of the Ukrainian Insurgent Army (UPA), which was involved in the Volhynia massacre, arguing that there was no moral difference between venerating the SS and venerating the UPA; she demonstratively tore up a piece of paper bearing the red-and-black UPA flag and spoke out against Ukraine’s admission to the EU. As a result, she was added to the “enemies list” on the website Myrotvorets.

== Personal life ==
She was born in Radom.She married Marcin Hernik, a graphic designer at the Farmer Support Foundation, Polish Land. She has been involved in the fur industry.
