= Reason Party =

Reason Party may refer to:

- Reason Party (Australia), a political party in Australia
- Reason Party (Poland), a political party in Poland
