= Maria Szyszkowska =

Polish politician

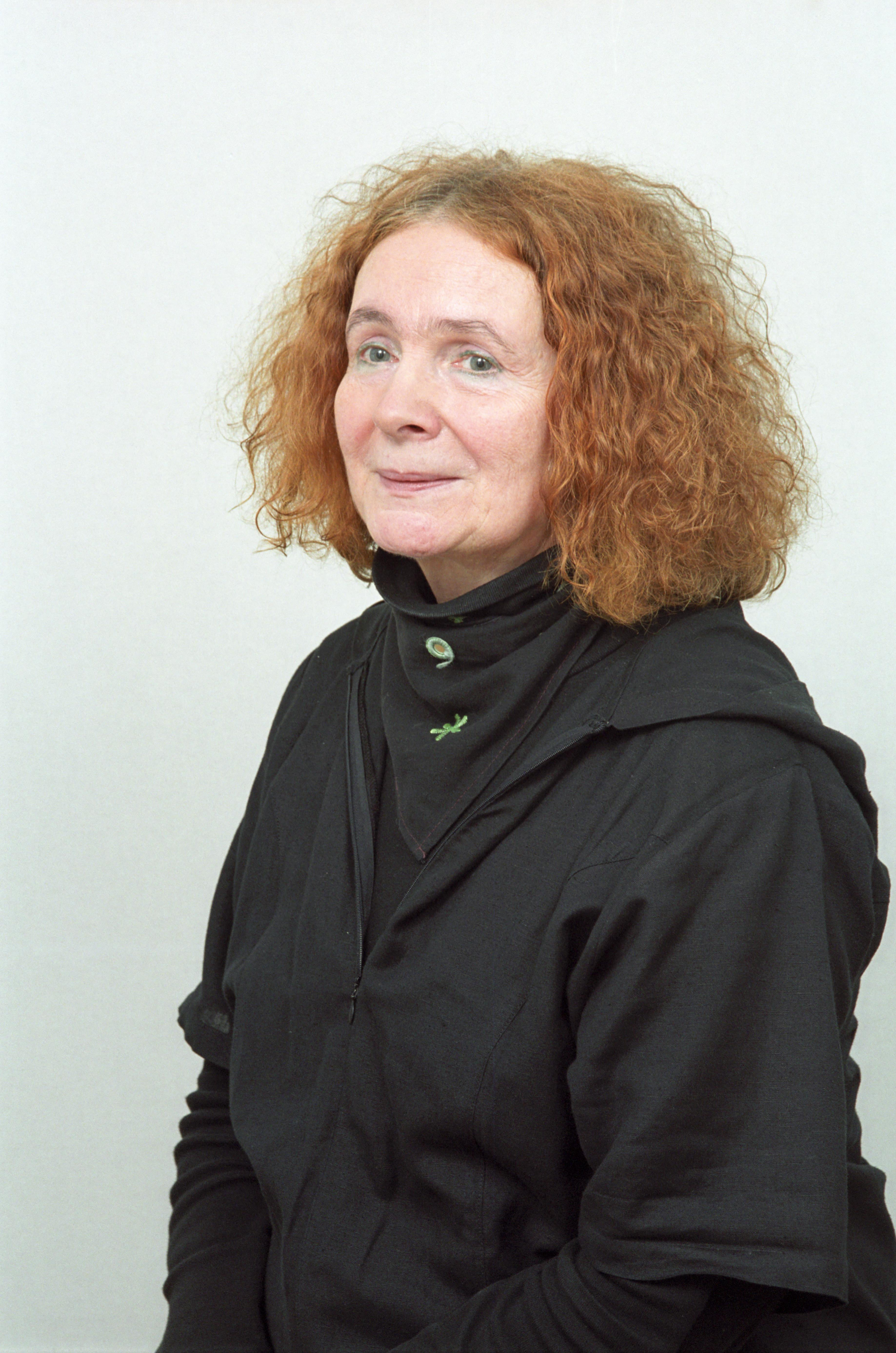
- Maria Szyszkowska
- Born: October 7, 1937 (age 88); Warsaw, Poland
- Occupations: writer, politician

Maria Szyszkowska (born October 7, 1937) is a Polish academic, writer and former senator. Szyszkowska was a member of the Democratic Left Alliance and chaired that Party's Ethics Committee. She is currently a leader of Reason of the Polish Left.

She was born into an old Polish noble family belonging to Clan Ostoja.

Szyszkowska graduated in law at the Warsaw University in 1961 and graduated in Christian philosophy at the Catholic Theological Academy the following year. She pursued an academic career and under the Communist regime was subject to government restrictions in the 1970s for pursuing studies in fields which were banned. She became a professor at Warsaw University in 1993.

Between 1993 and 1997 she served as a judge on the State Tribunal.

As a senator Szyszkowska introduced legislation to recognise civil unions for same-sex couples. She has received awards recognising her work promoting tolerance and social acceptance. She has also been recognised for her work in promoting the rights of gay and lesbian people.

In May 2005 Szyszkowska expressed her intention to run as an independent candidate in the 2005 Presidential Election. She was endorsed by the APP RACJA party (a left-wing anti-clerical party) however ran as a candidate for the Sejm (lower house of Parliament) in the 2005 Parliamentary election on the Polish Labour Party electoral committee list. The list comprised candidates from other parties including the Anticlerical Progress Party REASON (RACJA), Communist Party of Poland, Polish Ecological Party – Greens and Polish Socialist Party. The grouping obtained 0.77% of the vote and was unsuccessful in electing a member to Parliament.

== Publications ==
   1970 – Neokantyzm. Filozofia społeczna wraz z filozofią prawa natury o zmiennej treści (Instytut Wydawniczy „Pax”)
   1972 – Dociekania nad prawem natury czyli o potrzebach człowieka (Instytut Wydawniczy „Pax”)
   1972 – U źródeł współczesnej filozofii prawa i filozofii człowieka (Instytut Wydawniczy „Pax”)
   1979 – Człowiek wobec siebie i wobec innego (Polskie Towarzystwo Higieny Psychicznej)
   1982 – Teorie prawa natury w XXI wieku w Polsce (Państwowe Wydawnictwo Naukowe)
   1985 – Twórcze niepokoje codzienności (Wydawnictwo Łódzkie)
   1987 – Mój dziennik (Wydawnictwo Łódzkie)
   1988 – Filozofia prawa i filozofia człowieka (Instytut Wydawniczy „Pax”)
   1993 – Filozofia Prawa. Filozofia polityki. Filozofia twórczości (Oficyna Naukowa)
   1993 – Europejska filozofia prawa (Wydawnictwo C.H. Beck)
   1992 – Zagubieni w codzienności (Wydawnictwo Anagram)
   1994 – Spotkania w salonie (Wydawnictwo Książkowe Twój Styl)
   1994 – Stwarzanie siebie (Wydawnictwo Interlibro)
   1995 – Europejska filozofia prawa (Wydawnictwo C.H. Beck oraz Państwowe Wydawnictwo Naukowe)
   1996 – Zagubieni w codzienności (Oficyna Naukowa)
   1996 – Zarys filozofii prawa (Wydawnictwo Temida 2)
   1997 – W poszukiwaniu sensu życia (Wydawnictwo Książkowe Twój Styl)
   1997 – Filozofia w Europie (Wydawnictwo Temida 2)
   1997 – Całe życie w opozycji. Rozmowy z Marią Szyszkowską (Oficyna Naukowa)
   1998 – Drogowskazy (Polska Agencja Promocyjna)
   1999 – Twórcze niepokoje codzienności (Wydawnictwo Książkowe Twój Styl)
   1999 – Filozoficzne interpretacje prawa
   2000 – Filozofia w Europie (Wydawnictwo Temida 2)
   2001 – Rozmowy z Marią Szyszkowską 1997–2001 (Wydawnictwo Matrix)
   2001 – Granice zwierzeń (Wydawnictwo Książkowe Twój Styl)
   2001 – Zagubieni w codzienności (Wydawnictwo Książkowe Twój Styl)
   2002 – Za horyzontem (Wydawnictwo Rosner & Wspólnicy)
   2004 – Lewicowość w XXI wieku (Wydawnictwo tCHu)
   2005 – Zamyślenia (Wydawnictwo Heliodor)
   2005 – Filozofia Kanta w XXI wieku (Wydawnictwo Anagram)
   2008 – Teoria i filozofia prawa (Dom Wydawniczy Elipsa)
   2009 – Odcienie codzienności (Kresowa Agencja Wydawnicza)
   2009 – Dzieje filozofii (Kresowa Agencja Wydawnicza)
   2010 – Każdy bywa pacjentem – zarys filozofii farmacji (Dom Wydawniczy Elipsa)
   2010 – Etyka (Kresowa Agencja Wydawnicza)
   2010 – Filozofia codzienności w rzeczywistości neoliberalnej (Dom Wydawniczy Elipsa)
   2011 – Na każdy temat z Marią Szyszkowską... rozmawia Stanley Devine (Helion One Press)
