= Fédération nationale de la libre pensée =

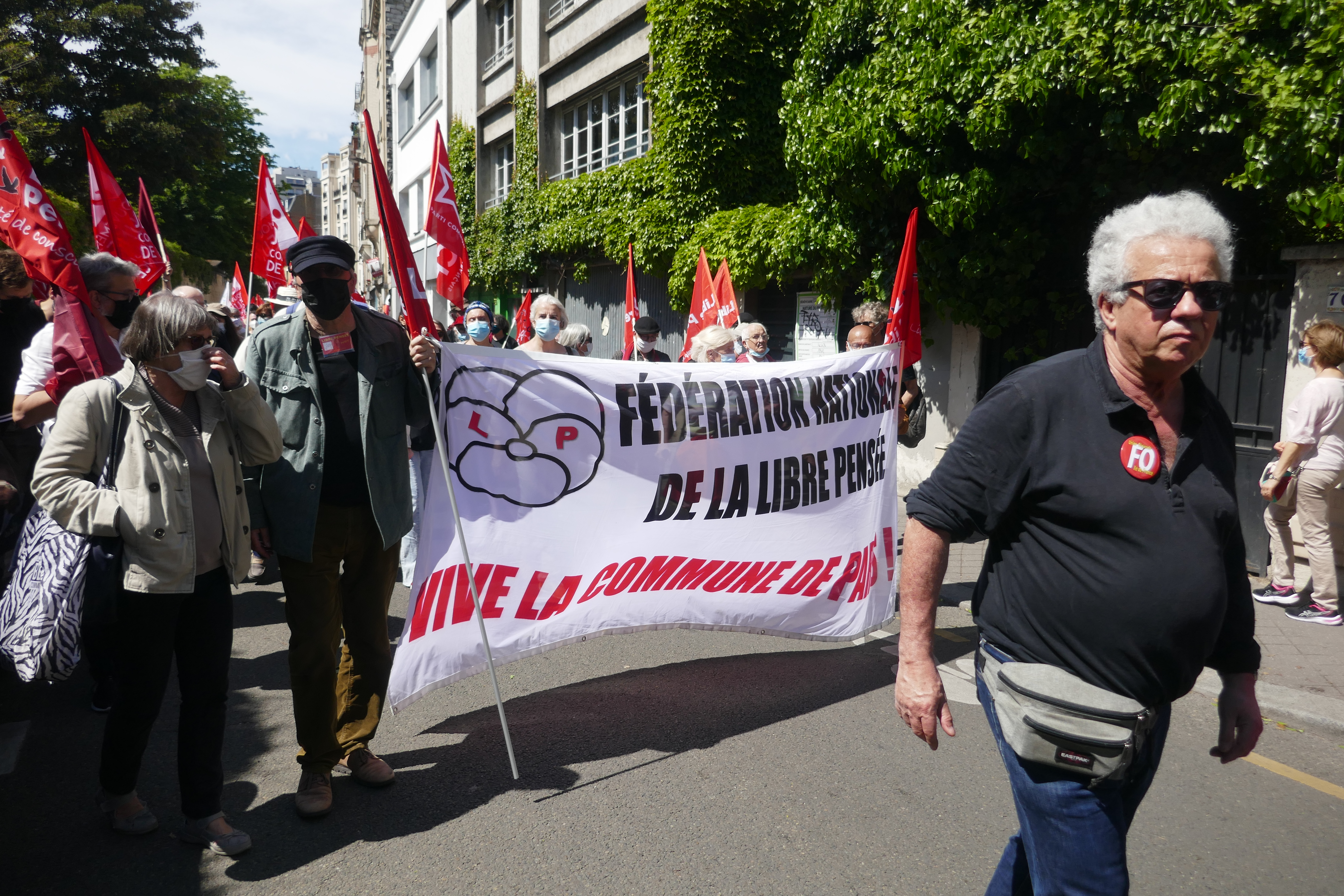
150th anniversary of the Paris Commune.

The Fédération nationale de la libre pensée (English: National Federation for Free Thought) is a French not-for-profit federation of local associations concerned with freethought, anti-clericalism, freedom of conscience, and civil rights^{,}.

It promotes humanist principles of free enquiry and tolerance on rationalist and scientific principles, campaigning against dogmatism. The Federation also advocates for socialism, pacifism, and public liberties.

== History ==
The Federation was created in 1890 by left-wing republicans. Its influence peaked in 1905, when the French law on the Separation of Churches and the State was drafted by special reporter Aristide Briand and adopted under the tenure of Parliament president Ferdinand Buisson, both of whom were members of the Federation. Like the Federation, both soon advocated for a liberal, open reading of the law, against the hardliners led by Clemenceau. Today, the Federation objects to contemporary anti-religious readings of the law and to the use of laïcité against Muslim associations.

== Action against the use of public funds for Christmas decorations ==
The Federation has brought legal actions under the 1905 French law on the Separation of the Churches and the State against the use of public funds on religious symbols, notably public installations of nativity scenes. In 2014, these actions resulted in the withdrawal of some installations on the principle of secularism, but the legal proceedings got nowhere.

== Publications ==
- Prévotel, Marc (2008). Cléricalisme moderne et mouvement ouvrier. Éditions Libertaires. Paris: Fédération nationale de la libre pensée. ISBN 978-2914980654.

== See also ==
- Anti-clericalism
- Irreligion in France
- Secularism in France
