= Janusz Palikot =

Polish politician, activist and businessman

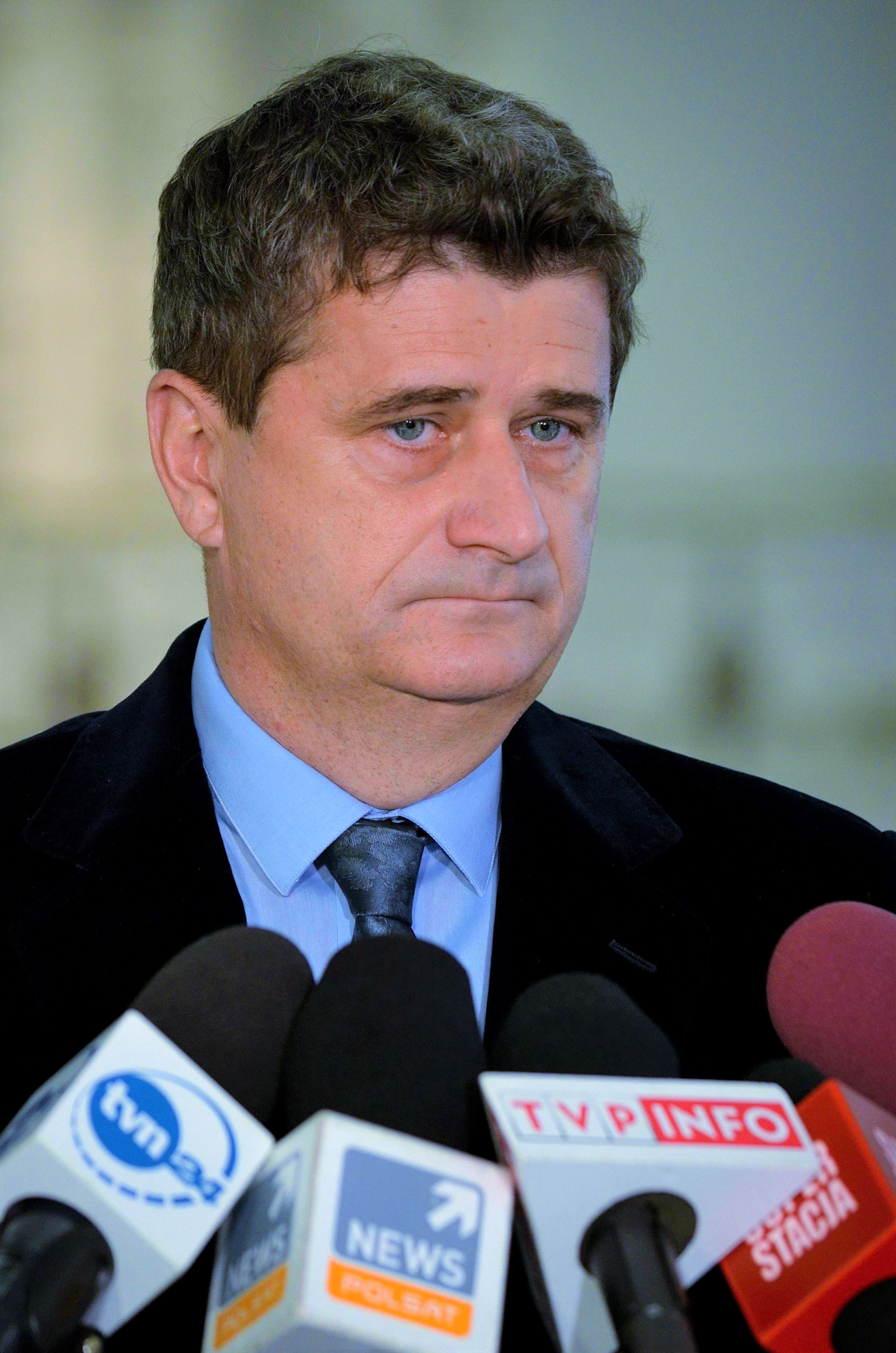

Leader of Palikot's Movement, leader of Your Movement
- In office 2 July 2011 – 2 March 2019
- Preceded by: office established
- Succeeded by: Marzenna Karkoszka; Kamil Żebrowski

Member of the Sejm
- In office 19 October 2005 – 15 September 2015
- Constituency: 6 – Lublin

Personal details
- Born: 26 October 1964 (age 61) Biłgoraj, Poland
- Party: Civic Platform (2005–2011); Your Movement (2011–2023)

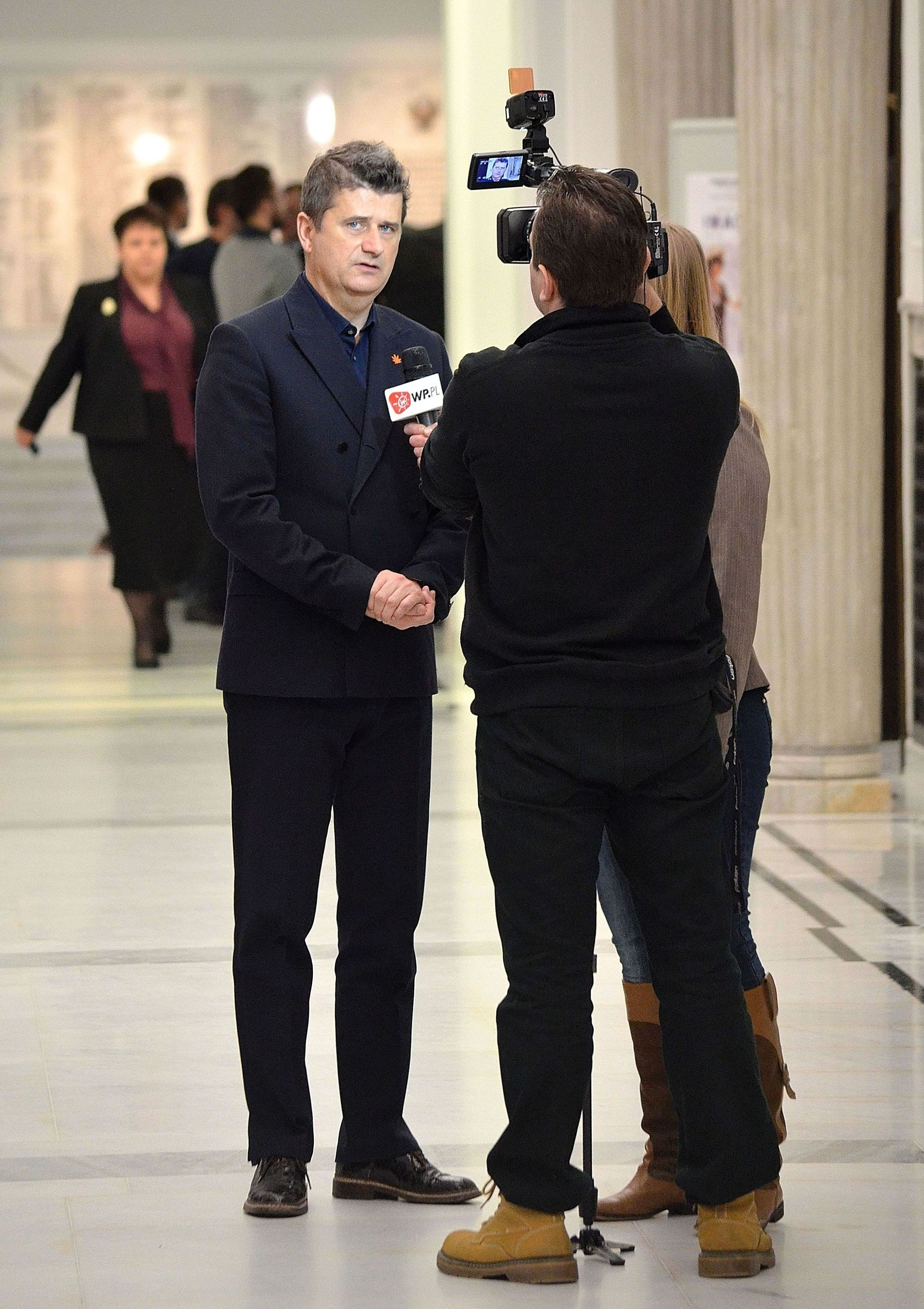
Janusz Palikot interviewed in the Sejm

Janusz Marian Palikot (Polish pronunciation: [ˈjanuʂ paˈlikɔt]; born 26 October 1964) is a Polish politician, activist and businessman. Palikot studied philosophy and became wealthy as a businessman who dealt with crates and distilled beverages. He was elected to Sejm on 25 September 2005 in the 6 Lublin district, running on the Civic Platform list, and was re-elected in 2007.

Palikot left Civic Platform in 2011 and founded Movement of Support, later renamed Palikot's Movement, an anti-clerical and liberal party, which won 10 percent of the vote in the 2011 parliamentary election.

== Personal life ==
Palikot was born in Biłgoraj. He studied philosophy at John Paul II Catholic University of Lublin and earned a master's degree at Warsaw University. He was an entrepreneur and had been co-owner of Polmos Lublin S.A. (a vodka business) and Ambra S.A. In 2005, he got divorced from his first wife, Maria Nowińska, with whom he has two sons (her parents funded his first steps as a businessman), Emil and Aleksander; he has since married Monika Kubat, with whom he has a son, Franciszek, and a daughter, Zofia.

== Controversies and publicity ==
Palikot is known in Poland for being one of the more controversial politicians, famous for his publicity stunts. In April 2007 during a PO press conference, Palikot wore a T-shirt with "I am with the SLD" ("Jestem z SLD") on the front and "I am gay" ("Jestem gejem") on the back. He later stated that he wanted to highlight the role PO should play in contemporary politics – as defenders of minorities.

On 24 April 2007, he produced a gun and a dildo at a press conference about alleged rape by a few police officers from Lublin. Palikot presented the objects as modern "symbols of law and justice" (a pun referring to the socially conservative Law and Justice Party) in Poland and Lublin's police.

On 23 July 2008, Palikot said in an interview "I consider the President to be an oaf" ("Uważam prezydenta za chama"), a potentially illegal act under Poland's anti-defamation laws. An investigation was launched, then dropped.

In October 2008 during a TV interview about the PZPN (Polish Football Association) Palikot produced a butchered pig's head, a Godfather-style sign of declaring war against what Palikot called "corrupt" PZPN officials.

In January 2009 Palikot caused further controversy when he wrote in his blog questioning whether the Polish President's brother, Jarosław Kaczyński, is gay: "I – unasked – declare unequivocally that I prefer women. And you, Mr Jarosław?" As a result, Donald Tusk, the leader of Palikot's party, the Civic Platform, launched an investigation into his behaviour.

On 5 July 2010, one day after the second round of the 2010 presidential elections Palikot announced that the late president Lech Kaczyński "has blood on his hands", blaming Kaczyński for the presidential airplane crash in Smolensk, in which Kaczyński, his wife Maria, and several senior government and military officials were killed.

On 20 January 2012, Palikot threatened to smoke a joint in Parliament in an attempt to get soft drugs legalized in Poland.

Although he had openly declared himself a non-believer for many years, in 2012 Palikot publicly announced that he had committed apostasy from the Catholic church and encouraged his followers to do the same. Apostasy from the church is normally a taboo subject in Poland, although it became popular during the October 2020 Polish protests.

== Accusations and prosecution of financial misconduct ==
In April 2009, National Prosecutor's office announced that it would look carefully into financing of the 2005 electoral campaign of Janusz Palikot. At that time, he managed to collect 856,000 złotys, but, according to the prosecutor's office, among sponsors of his campaign were students and pensioners, who handed over to his campaign office the sums reaching up to 20,000 zł; the money they otherwise could never afford. Dariusz Piatek of local office of the Civic Platform in Lublin stated afterwards that Palikot's campaign was "illegally financed", but the case was never highlighted due to Palikot's influences.

In the summer of 2011, authorities of Central Anticorruption Bureau announced that Palikot was suspected of tampering with his property statements in the years 2005–2010. Palikot allegedly reported a lower level of wealth than he actually possessed, by millions of zlotys. His ex-wife supported the Bureau's efforts, stating that the politician provided false information. In an investigation, which was initiated by Maria Nowinska, prosecutor's office asked the government of The Netherlands Antilles for help, as Palikot is suspected of transferring part of his money to that country, which is a tax haven. In October 2010, internet portal www.niezalezna.pl wrote that Palikot owes large sums of money to different companies, institutions and people. Among others, he owes 40,000 zlotys to a private contractor, Andrzej Kwapis, who renovated his office, but was never paid for the work. Palikot did not pay the money to a company that maintained his webpage, nor did he pay Piotr Tymochowicz, a public relations specialist, who helped with creating his image. In October 2011, the Electoral Committee of Palikot Movement lost a court case against Pawel Tanajno, who had stated in Wprost weekly, that Palikot and his party act "like a mafia", paying people who service them only "50 percent or nothing". Justice Tomasz Wojciechowski said that refusing to pay bills was not "accidental, but rather a frequent practice". Wojciechowski emphasized that Palikot had planned "to gull people who trusted him", citing an e-mail, written by Palikot to chairwoman of his office, in which he mentioned "building the capital at the expense of suppliers".

In May 2009, Michał Majewski and Wojciech Cieśla of Dziennik Polska-Europa-Świat daily established that Palikot had received millions of złotys in loans from anonymous companies, established in different tax havens. The politician owed back then €2 million to a company called Central European Private Investments (CEPI), which had belonged to him. CEPI had been founded by him in March 2007, with capital of €100,000, but in the following months, Palikot borrowed €2 million from it. CEPI itself used to borrow money from a company called Decleora, whose address was a mail box in Limassol, Cyprus. It is not known where Decleora's money came from, because Cypriot law allows for information about financial transactions of companies registered there to be hidden. When asked about Decleora, Janusz Palikot stated that he did not know who owned the company from Cyprus. Michał Majewski and Wojciech Cieśla further established that Decleora's shares had been owned by New Age Private Foundation from Curaçao, whose address was the same as the address of JP Family Foundation – a company, through which Palikot had allegedly transferred money out of Poland in 2004. Furthermore, all mentioned companies were serviced by ATC, a managing company from Amsterdam.

In 2018, tax authorities investigated possible cases of tax fraud. Palikot evaded subpoena several times, stating that the investigations were motivated politically. Palikot's later businesses mostly relied upon crowdfunding, with social media marketing attracting thousands of micro investments using celebrity testimonials such as Kuba Wojewódzki. Palikot was feed and indicted several times for breaking alcohol advertisement regulations in Poland; in one case, he was charged to pay a fee of almost 1 million Złoty in person. Afterwards, grocery group Żabka cancelled a marketing agreement. In recent years, he became more and more indebted and unable to pay salaries in various companies. In October 2024 he was detained by Central Anticorruption Bureau for alleged severe fraud, together with two business partners. Palikot left jail in January 2025. Several of his companies were defunct as of early 2025.

== Publications and books ==
- 2003: Myśli o nowoczesnym biznesie (written with Krzysztof Obłoj), ISBN 83-89405-26-1.
- 2007: Płoną koty w Biłgoraju (extended interview by Artur Sporniak and Jan Strzałka), ISBN 978-83-7453-699-8.
- 2008: Poletko Pana P., ISBN 978-83-7453-861-9.
- 2009: Pop-polityka, ISBN 978-83-7453-926-5.
- 2010: Ja Palikot (extended interview by Cezary Michalski), ISBN 978-83-7700-001-4.
- 2011: Kulisy Platformy (extended interview by Anna Wojciechowska), ISBN 978-83-7700-026-7.
- 2014: Zdjąć Polskę z krzyża, ISBN 978-83-280-0959-2.
- 2015: Janusz Palikot. Wszystko jest możliwe. Biografia (autobiography), ISBN 978-83-7453-296-9.
- 2017: Nic-nic Ontologia na marginesach Leśmiana, ISBN 978-83-939-7997-4.
- 2020: Piwo i dobre jedzenie (cookbook), ISBN 978-83-745-3422-2.
- 2022: Zapiski z Marakeszu, ISBN 978-83-786-6581-6.
- 2022: Gruzińskie, ISBN 978-83-786-6454-3.
- 2022: Wenecjowanie, ISBN 978-83-786-6574-8.
- 2023: Stany amerykańskie, ISBN 978-83-786-6463-5.
- 2024: Kulisy biznes-show, czyli jak wydałem 220 mln, ISBN 978-83-936-3711-9.

== See also ==
- Members of Polish Sejm 2005-2007
