= Roman Kotliński =

Polish politician (born 1967)

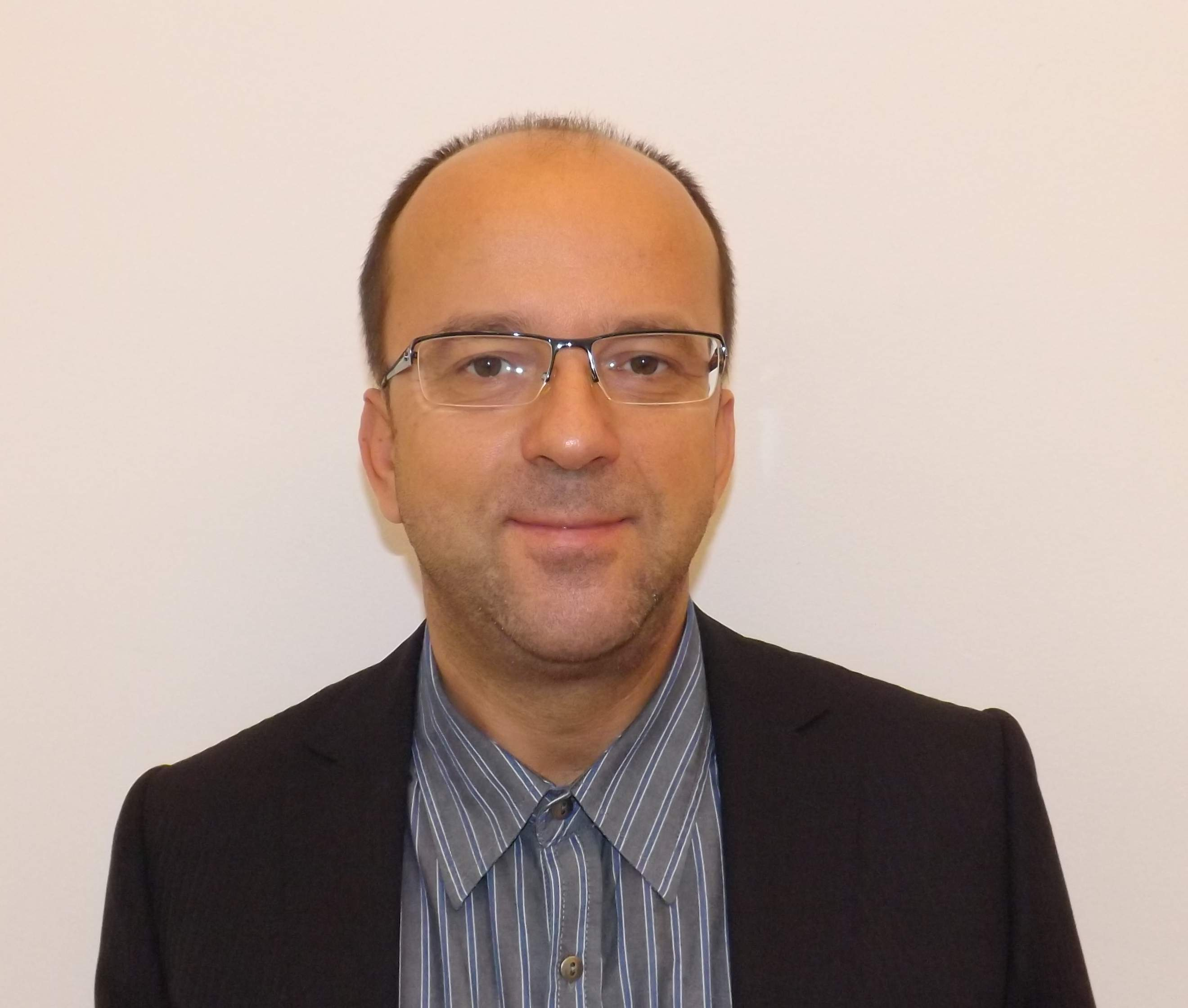

Member of the Sejm
- Incumbent
- Assumed office October 2011
- Constituency: 9 – Łódź

Personal details
- Party: Palikot's Movement; Reason Party (previously); Democratic Left Alliance (previously)

Roman Kotliński (born 15 March 1967) is a Polish politician, publisher, writer and journalist. He was a Roman Catholic priest for three years. He published a trilogy Byłem księdzem (I was a priest) and in March 2000 he began publishing the newspaper "Fakty i Mity", left-wing and anticlerical oriented weekly magazine. He was member of Democratic Left Alliance for several years, then become co-founder of Reason Party. In the October 2011 parliamentary elections, he was elected to the Sejm as a candidate of the Palikot's Movement receiving 17,720 votes in Łódź district.

Kotliński believes that Grzegorz Piotrowski abducted Father Jerzy Popiełuszko but did not kill him. "Fakty i Mity" cooperated with Grzegorz Piotrowski.
