= Anti-clericalism =

Opposition to clericalism

Anti-clericalism is opposition to religious authority, typically in social or political matters. Historically, anti-clericalism in Christian traditions has been opposed to the influence of Catholicism.

Some have opposed clergy on the basis of moral corruption, institutional issues and/or disagreements in religious interpretation, such as during the Protestant Reformation. Anti-clericalism became extremely violent during the French Revolution, because revolutionaries claimed the church played a pivotal role in the systems of oppression which led to it. Many clerics were killed, and French revolutionary governments tried to put priests under the control of the state by making them employees.

Anti-clericalism appeared in Catholic Europe throughout the 19th century, in various forms, and later in Canada, Cuba, and Latin America.

== Europe ==
During the Protestant Reformation, anti-clericalism resulted from opposition to the political and economic privileges of the clergy.

=== France ===
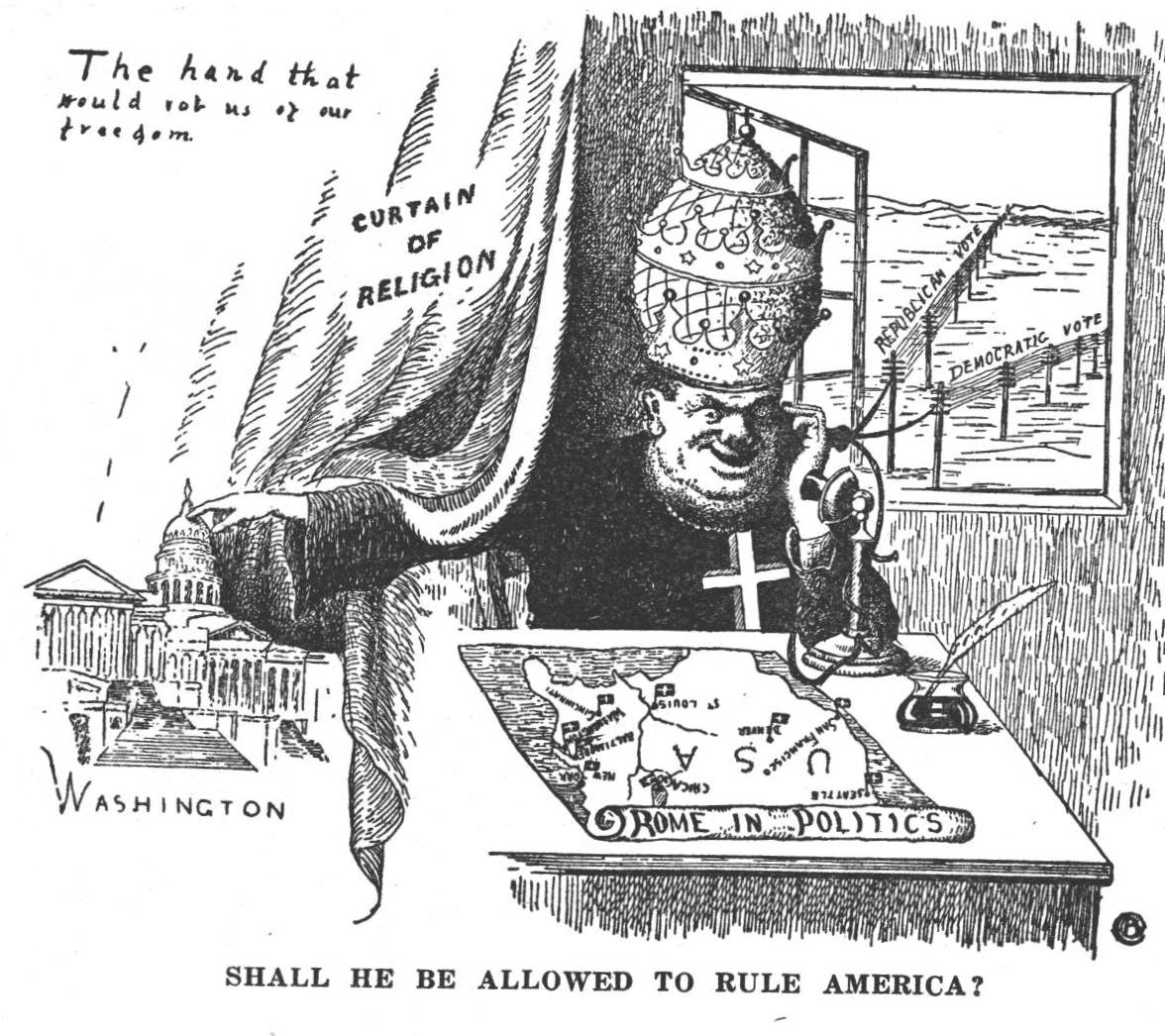
"Shall he be allowed to rule America?"

==== Revolution ====
The Civil Constitution of the Clergy was passed on July 12, 1790, requiring all clerics to swear allegiance to the French government and, by extension, to the increasingly anti-clerical National Constituent Assembly. All but seven of the 160 bishops refused the oath, as did about half of the parish priests. Persecution of the clergy and of the faithful was the first trigger of the rebellion; the second being conscription. Nonjuring priests were exiled or imprisoned and women on their way to Mass were beaten in the streets.

The anti-clericalism during the French Revolution initially began with attacks on church corruption and the wealth of the higher clergy, an action with which even many Christians could identify, since the Catholic Church held a dominant role in pre-revolutionary France. During a two-year period known as the Reign of Terror, the episodes of anti-clericalism grew more violent than Europe would see until the rise of state atheism in communist Eastern Europe. The new revolutionary authorities suppressed the church; abolished the Catholic monarchy; nationalized church property; exiled 30,000 priests and killed hundreds more. Many churches were converted into "temples of reason", in which atheistical services were held. There has been much scholarly debate over whether the movement was popularly motivated. As part of the campaign to dechristianize France, in October 1793 the Christian calendar was replaced with one reckoning from the date of the Revolution, and Festivals of Liberty, Reason and the Supreme Being were scheduled. New forms of moral religion emerged, including the deistic Cult of the Supreme Being and France's first established state sponsored atheistic Cult of Reason, with all churches not devoted to these being closed. In April and May 1794, the government mandated the observance of a festival of the Cult of the Supreme Being. When anti-clericalism became a clear goal of French revolutionaries, counter-revolutionaries seeking to restore tradition and the Ancien Régime took up arms, particularly in the War in the Vendée (1793 to 1796). Local people often resisted dechristianization and forced clergymen who had resigned to conduct Mass again. Eventually, Maximilien Robespierre and the Committee of Public Safety denounced the dechristianization campaign and tried to establish their own religion, while omitting what they regarded as the more superstitious elements of Catholicism.

When Pope Pius VI took sides against the revolution in the First Coalition (1792–1797), Napoleon Bonaparte invaded Italy (1796). French troops imprisoned the Pope in 1797, and he died after six weeks of captivity. After a change of heart, Napoleon then re-established the Catholic Church in France with the signing of the Concordat of 1801, and banned the Cult of the Supreme Being. Many anti-clerical policies continued. When Napoleonic armies entered a territory, monasteries were often sacked, and church property secularized.

==== Third Republic ====
A further phase of anti-clericalism occurred during the French Third Republic and its contention with the Catholic Church. After the Concordat of 1801 the Catholic Church enjoyed preferential treatment from the French state (formally equal with the Jewish, Lutheran and Calvinist minority religions, but in practice with much more influence). During the 19th century, public schools employed primarily priests as teachers, and religion was taught in schools (teachers also lead the class to Mass). This changed during the 1880s as several anti-clerical international gatherings took place in Paris, leading to the establishment of the Fédération nationale de la libre pensée, a strongly anti-clerical society uniting socialists, anarchists and liberals. In 1881–1882 Jules Ferry's government passed the Jules Ferry laws, establishing free education (1881) and excluding clerics and religious education from schools (1882).

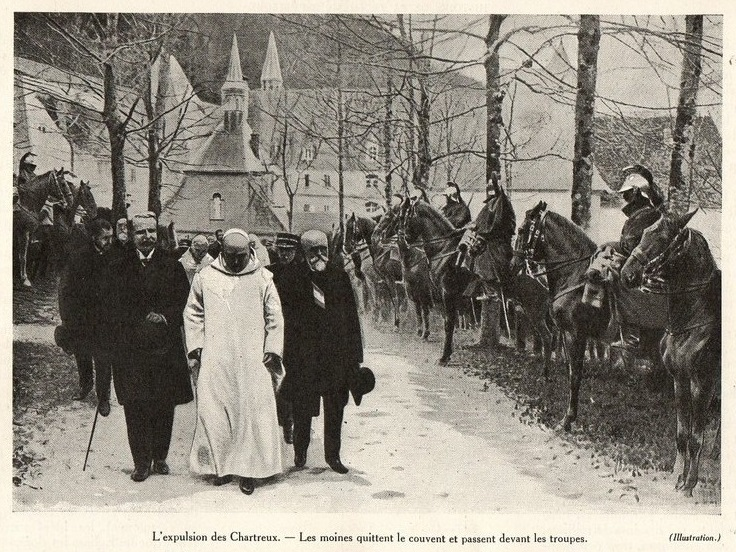
Forcible closure of the Grande Chartreuse monastery in 1903

In 1880 and 1882 Benedictine teaching monks were effectively exiled. This was not completed until 1901.

A law of 7 July 1904 prevented religious congregations from sponsoring and conducting schools, and the Law on the separation of the Churches and the State of 1905, were enacted under the government of Radical-Socialist Émile Combes. Alsace-Lorraine was not subject to these laws, as it was part of the German Empire.

In the Affaire des Fiches (1904–1905), it was discovered that the anti-clerical War Minister of the Combes government, General Louis André, was determining promotions based on the French Masonic Grand Orient's card index on public officials, detailing which were Catholic and who attended Mass, with a view to preventing the promotion of Catholics.

In the years following their relocation outside France, boarding schools of congregants were accused by some senators of trying to "recruit" French youth from abroad, supposedly placing the French Republic "in jeopardy".

Republicans' anti-clericalism softened after the First World War as the Catholic right-wing began to accept the Republic and secularism as allies against socialism. In the present day, the issue of subsidized private schools, which are overwhelmingly Catholic but whose teachers draw pay from the state, remains a sensitive issue in French politics, and the Fédération Nationale de la Libre-Pensée, now commonly associated with the anti-clerical far-left, maintains its strongly anti-clerical stance.

=== Austria (Holy Roman Empire) ===
Emperor Joseph II (emperor 1765–1790) opposed what he called "contemplative" religious institutions – reclusive Catholic institutions that he perceived as doing nothing positive for the community. His policy towards them is included in what is called Josephinism.

Joseph decreed that Austrian bishops could not communicate directly with the Curia. More than 500 of 1,188 monasteries in Austro-Slav lands (and a hundred more in Hungary) were dissolved, and 60 million florins taken by the state. This wealth was used to create 1,700 new parishes and welfare institutions.

The education of priests was taken from the Church as well. Joseph established six state-run "General Seminaries". In 1783, a Marriage Patent treated marriage as a civil contract rather than a religious institution.

Catholic historians have claimed that there was an alliance between Joseph and anti-clerical Freemasons.

=== Germany ===
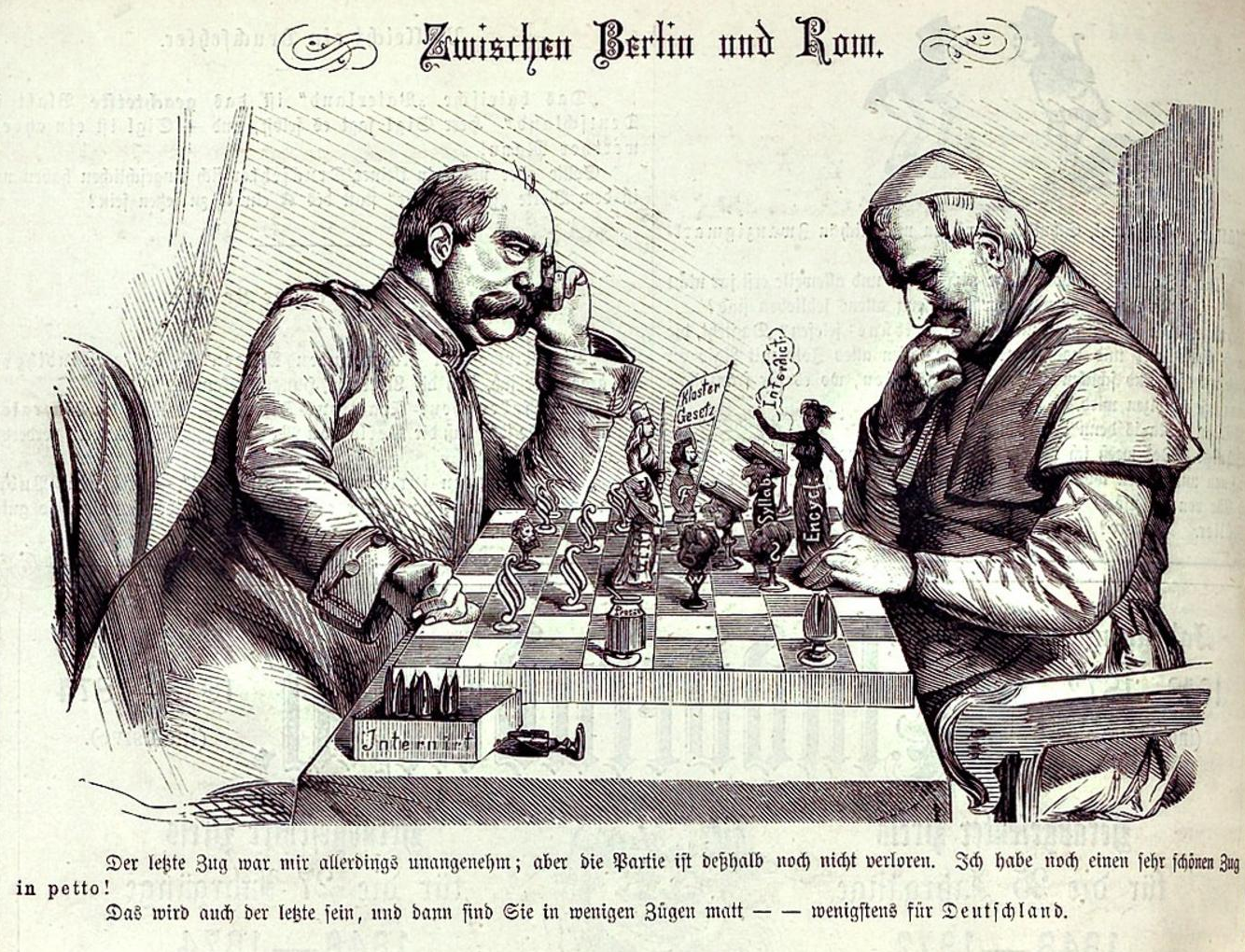
"Between Berlin and Rome", with Bismarck on the left and the Pope on the right. Kladderadatsch, 1875.

The Kulturkampf (literally "culture struggle") refers to German policies in reducing the role and power of the Catholic Church in Prussia, enacted from 1871 to 1878 by the Prime Minister of Prussia, Otto von Bismarck.

Bismarck accelerated the Kulturkampf, which did not extend to the other German states such as Bavaria (where Catholics were in a majority). As one scholar put it, "the attack on the church included a series of Prussian, discriminatory laws that made Catholics feel understandably persecuted within a predominantly Protestant nation." Jesuits, Franciscans, Dominicans and other orders were expelled in the culmination of twenty years of anti-Jesuit and antimonastic hysteria.

In 1871, the Catholic Church comprised 36.5% of the population of the German Empire, including millions of Germans in the west and South, as well as the vast majority of Poles. In this newly founded Empire, Bismarck sought to appeal to liberals and Protestants (62% of the population) by reducing the political and social influence of the Catholic Church.

Priests and bishops who resisted the Kulturkampf were arrested or removed from their positions. By the height of anti-Catholic measures, half of the Prussian bishops were in prison or in exile, a quarter of the parishes had no priest, half the monks and nuns had left Prussia, a third of the monasteries and convents were closed, 1800 parish priests were imprisoned or exiled, and thousands of laypeople were imprisoned for helping the priests.

The Kulturkampf backfired, as it energized the Catholics to become a political force in the Centre party and revitalized Polish resistance. The Kulturkampf ended about 1880 with a new pope Leo XIII willing to negotiate with Bismarck. Bismarck broke with the Liberals over religion and over their opposition to tariffs; He won Centre party support on most of his conservative policy positions, especially his attacks against socialism.

=== Italy ===
Anti-clericalism in Italy is connected with reaction against the absolutism of the Papal States, overthrown in 1870. For a long time, the pope required Catholics not to participate in the public life of the Kingdom of Italy that had invaded the Papal States to complete the unification of Italy, prompting the pope to declare himself a "prisoner" in the Vatican. Some politicians that had played important roles in this process, such as Giuseppe Garibaldi and Camillo Benso, conte di Cavour, were known to be hostile to the temporal and political power of the Church. Throughout the history of Liberal Italy, relations between the Italian government and the Church remained acrimonious, and anti-clericals maintained a prominent position in the ideological and political debates of the era. Tensions eased between church and state in the 1890s and early 1900s as a result of both sides' mutual hostility toward the burgeoning Socialist movement. Initially also anticlerical, fascist Benito Mussolini tempered such rhetoric to win support from Catholics and later as dictator, official hostility between the Holy See and the Italian state was finally settled by Pope Pius XI and him: the Lateran Accords were finalised in 1929.

After World War II, anti-clericalism was embodied by the Italian Communist (PCI) and Italian Socialist (PSI) parties, in opposition to the Vatican-backed party Christian Democracy (DC). Since the PSI joined DC-led coalition governments, the DC under Aldo Moro turned centre-left. In 1978, with support of the PSI, the DC-led coalition government legalized abortion despite strong opposition from the Catholic Church and DC conservative factions.

The revision of the Lateran treaties during the 1980s by the PSI Prime Minister Bettino Craxi, removed the status of "official religion" of the Catholic Church, but still granted a series of provisions in favour of the Church, such as the eight per thousand law, the teaching of religion in schools, and other privileges.

In recent years, the Italian society has got increasingly secularized and many contest the intervention of the Catholic Church in Italian politics, usually through voting instructions to the faithful and to Catholic parliamentarians on the legislative and regulatory action of the State. For example, the positions of Cardinal Camillo Ruini in the 2005 Italian fertility laws referendum attracted criticism, and so did his opposition to a 2007 bill that would have provided recognition of same-sex unions in Italy. From the side of the Church, a right to express its opinions and a moral duty in guiding Christians on ethical questions is claimed.

=== Poland ===
Your Movement is an anti-clerical party founded in 2011 by politician Janusz Palikot. Palikot's Movement won 10% of the national vote at the 2011 Polish parliamentary election.

In modern Polish media anti-clericalism is/was promoted by magazine NIE and Roman Kotliński's newspaper Fakty i Mity.

=== Portugal ===
The fall of the Monarchy in the Republican revolution of 1910 led to another wave of anti-clerical activity. Most church property was put under State control, and the church was not allowed to inherit property. The revolution and the republic allegedly took a "hostile" approach to the issue of church and state separation, like that of the French Revolution, the Spanish Constitution of 1931 and the Mexican Constitution of 1917. As part of the anti-clerical revolution, the bishops were driven from their dioceses, the property of clerics was seized by the state, wearing of the cassock was banned, all minor seminaries were closed and all but five major seminaries. A law of February 22, 1918, permitted only two seminaries in the country, but they had not been given their property back. Religious orders were expelled from the country, including 31 orders comprising members in 164 houses (in 1917 some orders were permitted to form again). Religious education was prohibited in both primary and secondary school. Religious oaths and church taxes were also abolished.

=== Spain ===
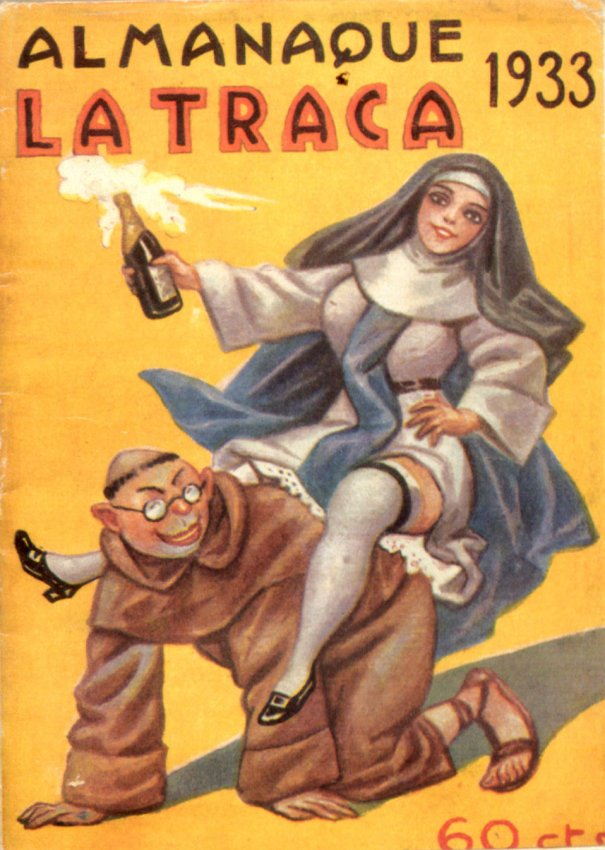
Anti-clerical cover of a magazine published in Valencia in 1933

The first instance of anti-clerical violence due to political conflict in 19th-century Spain occurred during the Trienio Liberal (Spanish Civil War of 1820–1823). During riots in Catalonia, 20 clergymen were killed by members of the liberal movement in retaliation for the Church's siding with absolutist supporters of Ferdinand VII.

In 1836 following the First Carlist War, the Ecclesiastical Confiscations of Mendizábal (Spanish: Desamortización) promulgated by Juan Álvarez Mendizábal, prime minister of the new regime abolished the major Spanish Convents and Monasteries.

Many years later the Radical Republican Party leader Alejandro Lerroux would distinguish himself by his inflammatory pieces of opinion.

==== Red Terror ====
The Republican government which came to power in Spain in 1931 was based on secular principles. In the first years some laws were passed secularising education, prohibiting religious education in the schools, and expelling the Jesuits from the country. On Pentecost 1932, Pope Pius XI protested against these measures and demanded restitution. He asked the Catholics of Spain to fight with all legal means against the injustices. June 3, 1933, he issued the encyclical Dilectissima Nobis, in which he described the expropriation of all Church buildings, episcopal residences, parish houses, seminaries and monasteries.

By law, they were now property of the Spanish State, to which the Church had to pay rent and taxes continuously in order to use these properties. "Thus the Catholic Church is compelled to pay taxes on what was violently taken from her". Religious vestments, liturgical instruments, statues, pictures, vases, gems and other valuable objects were expropriated as well.

During the Spanish Civil War of 1936–1939, Catholics largely supported Franco and the Nationalist forces. Anti-clerical assaults called the Red Terror by Nationalists, included sacking and burning monasteries and churches and killing 6,832 members of the clergy.

This number comprises:

- 13 bishops (from the dioceses of Sigüenza, Lleida, Cuenca, Barbastro Segorbe, Jaén, Ciudad Real, Almería, Guadix, Barcelona, Teruel and the auxiliary of Tarragona);
- 4,172 diocesan priests;
- 2,364 monks and friars, among them 259 Clarentians, 226 Franciscans, 204 Piarists, 176 Brothers of Mary, 165 Christian Brothers, 155 Augustinians, 132 Dominicans, and 114 Jesuits.
- 283 nuns, according to one source, some of whom were badly tortured.

There are accounts of Catholic faithful being forced to swallow rosary beads, thrown down mine shafts and priests being forced to dig their own graves before being buried alive. The Catholic Church has canonized several martyrs of the Spanish Civil War and beatified hundreds more.

Prior to the Falangists joining Francisco Franco's unified alliance of right-wing parties, the party exhibited anti-clerical tendencies, and saw the Catholic Church as an elite institution that presented an obstacle to the Falangist's full control the state. Despite this, the Falangists had not been involved in any massacres of Catholics, and it went on to support the Church as a result of their alliance to monarchists and other nationalist movements.

== Philippines ==
Philippine anti-clericalism is rooted in the anti-clericalism of 19th-century Spain. José Rizal, a member of the ilustrado class during the Spanish colonial period and one of the most prominent of the Philippines' national heroes held anti-clerical views until his eventual recantation before his day of execution. The Katipunan, the secret society that spearheaded the Philippine Revolution after Rizal's execution, was also noted for its anti-clericalism. After Philippine independence was recognized by the United States, the inclusion of Rizal's novels Noli me tangere and El filibusterismo in the country's formal-education curricula was strongly opposed by the domestic Catholic Church hierarchy.

Rodrigo Duterte, the country's previous president, has adopted a combative verbal stance toward the Church hierarchy and its staunchest supporters. In 2015, he blamed and cursed Pope Francis for the traffic congestion in the national capital; he later apologized and clarified that it was the government's fault and not the pope's. In 2019, he predicted the Church's temporal demise in 25 years. Duterte, however, has underscored that his animosity toward the Church was purely personal and warned the otherwise uninvolved public against taking unethical action against the clergy.

== Canada ==
In French Canada following the Conquest, much like in Ireland or Poland under foreign rule, the Catholic Church was the sole national institution not under the direct control of the British colonial government. It was also a major marker of social difference from the incoming Anglo-Protestant settlers. French Canadian identity was almost entirely centred around Catholicism, and to a much lesser extent the French language. However, there was a small anti-clerical movement in French Canada in the early nineteenth drawing inspiration from American and French liberal revolutions. This group was one current (but by no means the dominant) one in the Parti canadien and its associated Lower Canada Rebellion of 1837. In the more democratic politics that followed the rebellions, the more radical and anti-clerical tendency eventually formed the Parti rouge in 1848.

At the same time in English Canada, a related phenomenon occurred where the primarily Nonconformist (mostly Presbyterian and Methodist) Reform movement conflicted with an Anglican establishment. In Upper Canada, The Reform Movement began as protest against the "establishment" of the Anglican church.

The vastly different religious backgrounds of the Reformers and rouges was one of the factors which prevented them from working together well during the era of two-party coalition government in Canada (1840–1867). By 1861, however, the two groups fused to create a united Liberal block. After 1867, this party added like-minded reformers from the Maritime provinces, but struggled to win power, especially in still strongly-Catholic Quebec.

Once Wilfrid Laurier became party leader, however, the party dropped its anti-clerical stance and went on to dominate Canadian politics throughout most of the 20th century. Since that time, Liberal prime ministers have been overwhelmingly Catholic (St. Laurent, both Pierre and Justin Trudeau, Chrétien, Martin), but since the 1960s Liberals have again had a strained relationship with the Catholic church, and have increasingly parted with the Catholic church's teachings on sexual morality, as when Pierre Trudeau legalized homosexuality and streamlined divorce (as justice minister under Pearson), and Martin legalized same-sex marriage.

In Quebec itself, the Quiet Revolution of the 1960s broke the hold of the church on provincial politics. The Quebec Liberal Party embraced formerly taboo social democratic ideas, and the state intervened in fields once dominated by the church, especially health and education, which were taken over by the provincial government. Quebec is now considered Canada's most secular province.

== United States ==
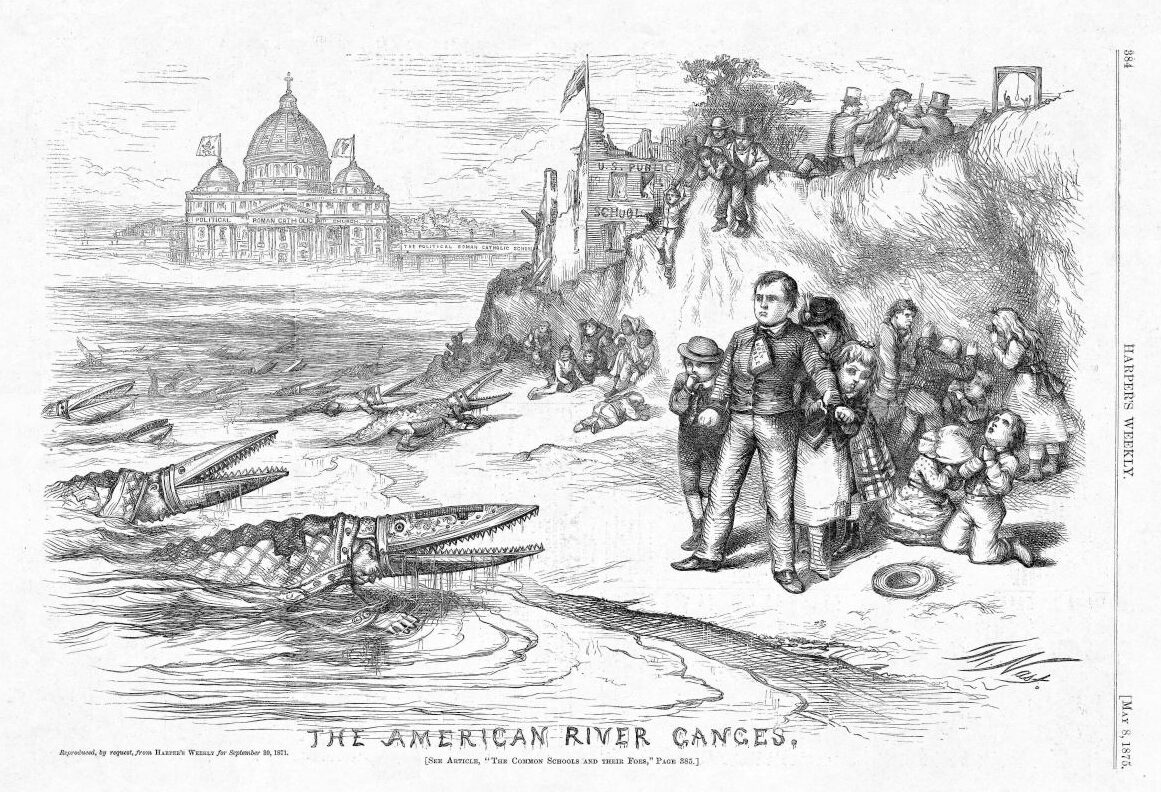
A famous 1876 editorial cartoon by Thomas Nast which portrays bishops as crocodiles who are attacking public schools, with the connivance of Irish Catholic politicians

Although anti-clericalism is more often spoken of regarding the history or current politics of Latin countries where the Catholic Church was established and where the clergy had privileges, Philip Jenkins notes in his 2003 book The New Anti-Catholicism that the U.S., despite the lack of Catholic establishments, has always had anti-clericals.

== Latin America ==
Of the population of Latin America, about 71% acknowledge allegiance to the Catholic Church. Consequently, about 43% of the world's Catholics inhabit the 'Latin' countries of South, Central and North America.

The slowness to embrace religious freedom in Latin America is related to its colonial heritage and to its post-colonial history. The Aztec, Maya and Inca cultures made substantial use of religious leaders to ideologically support governing authority and power. This pre-existing role of religion as ideological adjunct to the state in pre-Columbian culture made it relatively easy for the Spanish conquistadors to replace native religious structures with those of a Catholicism that was closely linked to the Spanish throne.

Anti-clericalism was a common feature of 19th-century liberalism in Latin America. This anti-clericalism was often purportedly based on the idea that the clergy (especially the prelates who ran the administrative offices of the Church) were hindering social progress in areas such as public education and economic development.

Beginning in the 1820s, a succession of liberal regimes came to power in Latin America. Some members of these liberal regimes sought to imitate the Spain of the 1830s (and revolutionary France of a half-century earlier) in expropriating the wealth of the Catholic Church, and in imitating the 18th-century benevolent despots in restricting or prohibiting the religious orders. As a result, a number of these liberal regimes expropriated Church property and tried to bring education, marriage and burial under secular authority. The confiscation of Church properties and changes in the scope of religious liberties (in general, increasing the rights of non-Catholics and non-observant Catholics, while licensing or prohibiting the orders) generally accompanied secularist and governmental reforms.

=== Mexico ===
The Mexican Constitution of 1824 had required the Republic to prohibit the exercise of any religion other than the Catholic faith.

==== Reform War ====
Starting in 1855, President Benito Juárez issued decrees nationalizing church property, separating church and state, and suppressing religious orders. Church properties were confiscated and basic civil and political rights were denied to religious orders and the clergy.

==== Cristero War ====
More severe laws called Calles Law during the rule of Plutarco Elías Calles eventually led to the Cristero War, an armed peasant rebellion supported by the Catholic Church, against the Mexican government.

Following the Mexican Revolution of 1910, the new Mexican Constitution of 1917 contained further anti-clerical provisions. Article 3 called for secular education in the schools and prohibited the Church from engaging in primary education; Article 5 outlawed monastic orders; Article 24 forbade public worship outside the confines of churches; and Article 27 placed restrictions on the right of religious organizations to hold property. Article 130 deprived clergy members of basic political rights. Many of these laws were resisted, leading to the Cristero Rebellion of 1927–1929. The suppression of the Church included the closing of many churches and the killing of priests. The persecution was most severe in Tabasco under the atheist governor Tomás Garrido Canabal.

The church-supported armed rebellion only escalated the violence. US Diplomat Dwight Morrow was brought in to mediate the conflict. But 1928 saw the assassination of President Alvaro Obregón by Catholic radical José de León Toral, gravely damaging the peace process.

The war had a profound effect on the Church. Between 1926 and 1934 at least 40 priests were killed. Between 1926 and 1934, over 3,000 priests were exiled or assassinated.

Where 4,500 priests served the people before the rebellion, in 1934 there were only 334 priests licensed by the government to serve fifteen million people, the rest having been eliminated by emigration, expulsion and assassination. It appears that ten states were left without any priests.

The Cristero rebels committed their share of violence, which continued even after formal hostilities had ended. In some of the worst cases, public school teachers were tortured and murdered by the former Cristero rebels. It is calculated that almost 300 rural teachers were murdered in this way between 1935 and 1939.

=== Ecuador ===
This issue was one of the bases for the lasting dispute between Conservatives, who represented primarily the interests of the Sierra and the church, and the Liberals, who represented those of the Costa and anti-clericalism. Tensions came to a head in 1875 when the conservative President Gabriel García Moreno, after being elected to his third term, was allegedly assassinated by anti-clerical Freemasons.

=== Colombia ===
Colombia enacted anti-clerical legislation and its enforcement during more than three decades (1849–84).

La Violencia refers to an era of civil conflict in various areas of the Colombian countryside between supporters of the Colombian Liberal Party and the Colombian Conservative Party, a conflict which took place roughly from 1948 to 1958.

Across the country, militants attacked churches, convents, and monasteries, killing priests and looking for arms, since the conspiracy theory maintained that the religious had guns, and this despite the fact that not a single serviceable weapon was located in the raids.

When their party came to power in 1930, anti-clerical Liberals pushed for legislation to end Church influence in public schools. These Liberals held that the Church and its intellectual backwardness were responsible for a lack of spiritual and material progress in Colombia. Liberal-controlled local, departmental and national governments ended contracts with religious communities who operated schools in government-owned buildings, and set up secular schools in their place. These actions were sometimes violent, and were met by a strong opposition from clerics, Conservatives, and even a good number of more moderate Liberals.

=== Argentina ===
The original Argentine Constitution of 1853 provided that all Argentine presidents must be Catholic and stated that the duty of the Argentine congress was to convert the Indians to Catholicism. All of these provisions have been eliminated with the exception of the mandate to "sustain" Catholicism.

Liberal anti-clericalists of the 1880s established a new pattern of church-state relations in which the official constitutional status of the Church was preserved while the state assumed control of many functions formerly the province of the Church. Conservative Catholics, asserting their role as definers of national values and morality, responded in part by joining in the rightist religio-political movement known as Catholic Nationalism which formed successive opposition parties. This began a prolonged period of conflict between church and state that persisted until the 1940s when the Church enjoyed a restoration of its former status under the presidency of Colonel Juan Perón. Perón claimed that Peronism was the "true embodiment of Catholic social teaching" – indeed, more the embodiment of Catholicism than the Catholic Church itself.

In 1954, Argentina saw extensive destruction of churches, denunciations of clergy and confiscation of Catholic schools as Perón attempted to extend state control over national institutions.

The renewed rupture in church-state relations was completed when Perón was excommunicated. However, in 1955, he was overthrown by a military general who was a leading member of the Catholic Nationalist movement.

=== Venezuela ===
In Venezuela, the government of Antonio Guzmán Blanco (in office from 1870 to 1877, from 1879 to 1884, and from 1886 to 1887) virtually crushed the institutional life of the church, even attempting to legalize the marriage of priests. These anti-clerical policies remained in force for decades afterward.

=== Cuba ===
Cuba, under the rule of atheist Fidel Castro, succeeded in reducing the Church's ability to work by deporting the archbishop and 150 Spanish priests, by discriminating against Catholics in public life and education and by refusing to accept them as members of the Communist Party. The subsequent flight of 300,000 people from the island also helped to diminish the Church there.

== Anti-clericalism in the Islamic world ==
In various traditions of Islam, Muslims who are not experts in Islamic jurisprudence (fiqh) are ought to follow the instructions of an expert, i.e., a mujtahid, (with the exception of "matters of belief" or usulu 'd-din). This deference is known as taqlid or "imitation” and is meant for experts in a broad range of matters. In practice this means asking a cleric trained in Islamic law for a fatwa or ‘legal opinion’ on the issue the Muslim is concerned about. This ties into the significance of local customs and practices, known as urf, in the context of Sunni Islam, which does not have a formal clergy.

Shia Islam, on the other hand, has had a doctrine of a centralized clergy in the imamate. Thus, by extension, the practice of taqlid has historically been more systematic. For example, as of the 19th century the Shia ulama taught believers to turn to the highest ranking clerics, known as "sources of taqlid" (marja' at-taqlid).

Following the 1979 Islamic Revolution in Iran—the one Muslim country where Shia form an overwhelming majority—even more systematic power was given to clerics. Under the doctrine of rule by Islamic jurists, or velayat-e faqih, Islamic clerics must rule or Islam will whither away. A cleric is head of state in Iran, and clerics control many powerful governmental positions.

=== Iran ===
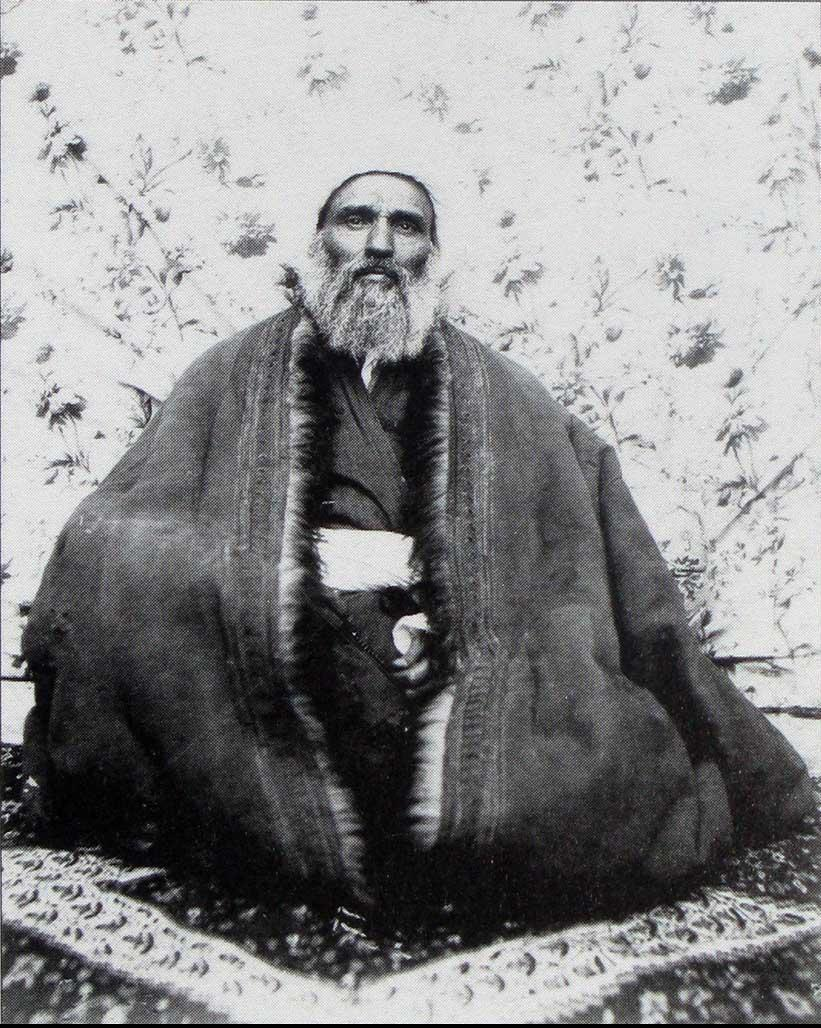
Akhund Khurasani is known to be the greatest theorist of Usuli Shi'ism in modern times.

During the first democratic revolution of Asia, the Iranian Constitutional Revolution, the Shia Marja Akhund Khurasani and his colleagues theorized a model of religious secularity in the absence of Imam, that still prevails in Shia seminaries. In absence of the ideal ruler, that is Imam al-Mahdi, democracy was the best available option. He considers opposition to constitutional democracy as hostility towards the twelfth Imam. He declared his full support for constitutional democracy and announced that objection to "foundations of constitutionalism" was un-Islamic. According to Akhund, "a rightful religion imposes conditions on the actions and behavior of human beings", which stem from either holy text or logical reasoning, and these constraints are essentially meant to prevent despotism. He believes that an Islamic system of governance can not be established without the infallible Imam leading it. Thus the clergy and modern scholars have concluded that a proper legislation can help reduce the state tyranny and maintain peace and security. He said:

Persian: سلطنت مشروعه آن است کہ متصدی امور عامه ی ناس و رتق و فتق کارهای قاطبه ی مسلمین و فیصل کافه ی مهام به دست شخص معصوم و موید و منصوب و منصوص و مأمور مِن الله باشد مانند انبیاء و اولیاء و مثل خلافت امیرالمومنین و ایام ظهور و رجعت حضرت حجت، و اگر حاکم مطلق معصوم نباشد، آن سلطنت غیرمشروعه است، چنان‌ کہ در زمان غیبت است و سلطنت غیرمشروعه دو قسم است، عادله، نظیر مشروطه کہ مباشر امور عامه، عقلا و متدینین باشند و ظالمه و جابره است، مثل آنکه حاکم مطلق یک نفر مطلق‌ العنان خودسر باشد. البته به صریح حکم عقل و به فصیح منصوصات شرع «غیر مشروعه ی عادله» مقدم است بر «غیرمشروعه ی جابره». و به تجربه و تدقیقات صحیحه و غور رسی‌ های شافیه مبرهن شده که نُه عشر تعدیات دوره ی استبداد در دوره ی مشروطیت کمتر می‌شود و دفع افسد و اقبح به فاسد و به قبیح واجب است.

English: "According to Shia doctrine, only the infallible Imam has the right to govern, to run the affairs of the people, to solve the problems of the Muslim society and to make important decisions. As it was in the time of the prophets or in the time of the caliphate of the commander of the faithful, and as it will be in the time of the reappearance and return of the Mahdi. If the absolute guardianship is not with the infallible then it will be a non-islamic government. Since this is a time of occultation, there can be two types of non-islamic regimes: the first is a just democracy in which the affairs of the people are in the hands of faithful and educated men, and the second is a government of tyranny in which a dictator has absolute powers. Therefore, both in the eyes of the Sharia and reason what is just prevails over the unjust. From human experience and careful reflection it has become clear that democracy reduces the tyranny of state and it is obligatory to give precedence to the lesser evil."

— Muhammad Kazim Khurasani

As "sanctioned by sacred law and religion", Akhund believes, a theocratic government can only be formed by the infallible Imam. Aqa Buzurg Tehrani also quoted Akhund Khurasani saying that if there was a possibility of establishment of a truly legitimate Islamic rule in any age, God must end occultation of the Imam of Age. Hence, he refuted the idea of absolute guardianship of jurist. Therefore, according to Akhund, Shia jurists must support the democratic reform. He prefers collective wisdom (Persian: عقل جمعی) over individual opinions, and limits the role of jurist to provide religious guidance in personal affairs of a believer. He defines democracy as a system of governance that enforces a set of "limitations and conditions" on the head of state and government employees so that they work within "boundaries that the laws and religion of every nation determines". Akhund believes that modern secular laws complement traditional religion. He asserts that both religious rulings and the laws outside the scope of religion confront "state despotism". Constitutionalism is based on the idea of defending the "nation's inherent and natural liberties", and as absolute power corrupts, a democratic distribution of power would make it possible for the nation to live up to its full potential.

In 1925, Rezā Khan proclaimed himself shah of the country. As part of his Westernization program, the traditional role of the ruling clergy was minimized; Islamic schools were secularized, women were forbidden to wear the hijab, sharia law was abolished, and men and women were desegregated in educational and religious environments. All this infuriated the ultraconservative clergy as a class. Rezā Khan's son and heir Mohammad Reza Pahlavi continued such practices. They ultimately contributed to the Islamic Revolution of 1978–79, and the Shah's flight from his country.

When Ayatollah Khomeini took power a month after the revolution, the Shah's anti-clerical measures were largely overturned, replaced by an Islamic Republic based on the principle of rule by Islamic jurists, velayat-e faqih, where clerics serve as heads of state and judges, veto legislation they consider un-Islamic and control who may run for president or parliament. However, by the late 1990s and 2000s, anti-clericalism was reported to be significant in the Islamic Republic of Iran:

Iran, although an Islamic state, imbued with religion and religious symbolism, is an increasingly anti-clerical country. In a sense it resembles some Catholic countries where religion is taken for granted, without public display, and with ambiguous feelings towards the clergy. Iranians tend to mock their mullahs, making mild jokes about them ...

Demonstrators using slogans such as "The clerics live like kings while we live in poverty!" One report claims "Working-class Iranian lamented clerical wealth in the face of their own poverty," and "stories about Swiss bank accounts of leading clerics circulated on Tehran's rumor mill."

=== Indonesia ===
During the fall of Suharto in 1998, a witch hunt in Banyuwangi against alleged sorcerers spiraled into widespread riots and violence. In addition to alleged sorcerers, Islamic clerics were also targeted and killed, Nahdlatul Ulama members were murdered by rioters.

== Certain branches of Freemasonry ==
According to the 1913 Catholic Encyclopedia, Freemasonry was historically viewed by the Catholic Church as being a principal source of anti-Clericalism – especially in, but not limited to, historically Catholic countries.

== See also ==
- Age of Enlightenment
- Agnosticism
- Atheism
- Anarchism
- Anti-Catholicism
- Anti-Christianity
- Clericalism
- Communism
- Christian anarchism
- Deism
- Dechristianisation of France during the French Revolution
- Denis Diderot
- Dissolution of the Monasteries
- Expulsion of congregations (1902-1903)
- Freethought
- Laïcité
- Left-wing politics
- Nonsectarian
- Relations between the Catholic Church and the state
- Secular humanism
- Secular liberalism
- Secularization
- Suppression of the Jesuits
- Thomas Paine
- Voltaire

== Bibliography ==
- Avramović, Sima (2007). "Understanding Secularism in a Post-Communist State: Case of Serbia" (PDF).
- Beevor, Antony (2006), The Battle For Spain; The Spanish Civil War 1936-1939, London: Weidenfeld & Nicolson.
- Berenger, Jean (1990), A History of the Habsburg Empire, 1700-1918, Edinburgh: Addison Wesley
- Campbell, Leslie (August 27, 2015). "Yemen: The Tribal Islamists".
- Clark, John F.; Decalo, Samuel (2012-08-09). Historical Dictionary of Republic of the Congo. Scarecrow Press. ISBN 9780810879898.
- Clarke, Duncan (February 1, 2009). Crude Continent: The Struggle for Africa's Oil Prize. Profile Books. p. 194. ISBN 9781847654557.
- de la Cueva, Julio (1998), "Religious Persecution, Anticlerical Tradition and Revolution: On Atrocities against the Clergy during the Spanish Civil War", Journal of Contemporary History, XXXIII (3): 355–369, JSTOR 261121
- "No religion for Chinese Communist Party cadres". deccanherald.com. 2011-12-19.
- Dodd, Jan (2003). The rough guide to Vietnam (7th ed.). London: Rough Guides. ISBN 9781405389730. OCLC 762991000.
- Doulos, Mikael (1986). "Christians in Marxist Ethiopia" (PDF).
- Economist staff (February 17, 2000), "The people against the mullahs", The Economist
- Franklin, James (2006), "Freemasonry in Europe", Catholic Values and Australian Realities, Connor Court Publishing Pty Ltd., pp. 7–10, ISBN 9780975801543
- Gross, Michael B. The War Against Catholicism: Liberalism and the Anti-Catholic Imagination in Nineteenth-Century Germany (University of Michigan Press, 2004)
- Gruber, Hermann (1909). "Masonry (Freemasonry)" . In Herbermann, Charles (ed.). Catholic Encyclopedia. Vol. 6. New York: Robert Appleton Company.
- Haas, Ernst B. (1997). Nationalism, Liberalism, and Progress: The dismal fate of new nations. Cornell University Press. ISBN 9780801431098.
- Hall, Derek R. (1999). "Representations of Place: Albania". The Geographical Journal. 165 (2): 161–172. Bibcode:1999GeogJ.165..161H. doi:10.2307/3060414. ISSN 0016-7398. JSTOR 3060414.
- Jedin, Hubert; Dolan, John; Adriányi, Gabriel (1981), History of the Church: The Church in the Twentieth Century, vol. X, Continuum International Publishing Group, ISBN 9780860120926
- Jedin, Hubert; Repgen, Konrad; Dolan, John, eds. (1999) [1981], History of the Church: The Church in the Twentieth Century, vol. X, New York & London: Burn & Oates
- Kalkandjieva, Daniela (June 12, 2015). "The encounter between the religious and the secular in post-atheist Bulgaria".
- Kellner, Mark A. (2014-10-31). "25 years after Berlin Wall's fall, faith still fragile in former East Germany". DeseretNews.com. Archived from the original on November 4, 2014.
- Kideckel, David; Halpern, Joel (2000). Neighbors at War: Anthropological Perspectives on Yugoslav Ethnicity, Culture, and History. Penn State Press. p. 165. ISBN 9780271044354.
- Kowalewski, David (1980). "Protest for Religious Rights in the USSR: Characteristics and Consequences". The Russian Review. 39 (4): 426–441. doi:10.2307/128810. ISSN 0036-0341. JSTOR 128810.
- Leustean, Lucian (2009). Orthodoxy and the Cold War: Religion and Political Power in Romania, 1947-65. la University of Michigan. ISBN 9780230594944.
- Mallin, Jay (1 January 1994). Covering Castro: Rise and Decline of Cuba's Communist Dictator. Transaction Publishers. ISBN 978-1-4128-2053-0.
- Marques de Morais, Rafael (April 27, 2014). "Religion and the State in Angola".
- Okey, Robin (2002), The Habsburg Monarchy c. 1765-1918, New York: Palgrave MacMillan
- Ramet, Sabrina (1998). Nihil Obstat: Religion, Politics, and Social Change in East-Central Europe and Russia. Duke University Press. ISBN 9780822320708.
- Sánchez, José Mariano (1972). Anticlericalism: A Brief History. University of Notre Dame Press.
- Stanton, Andrea (2012). Cultural Sociology of the Middle East, Asia, and Africa: An Encyclopedia L. SAGE. ISBN 9781412981767.
- Sanders, Alan (April 9, 2003). Historical Dictionary of Mongolia. Scarecrow Press. p. 10. ISBN 9780810874527.
- Stiller, Brian (June 18, 2013). "Laos: A Nation With Religious Contradictions". HuffPost.
- Temperman, Jeroen (2010). State-Religion Relationships and Human Rights Law: Towards a Right to Religiously Neutral Governance. Brill Academic/Martinus Nijhoff Publishers. ISBN 9789004181489.
- Thomas, Hugh (1994) [1961], The Spanish Civil War, Touchstone, ISBN 9780671758769.
- Van den Bergh-Collier, Edda (January 2007). "Towards Gender Equality in Mozambique" (PDF). p. 180. Archived from the original (PDF) on 2019-03-29.
- Walaszek, Zdzislawa (January 1986). "An Open Issue of Legitimacy: The State and the Church in Poland". The Annals of the American Academy of Political and Social Science. 483 (1): 118–134. doi:10.1177/0002716286483001011. ISSN 0002-7162. S2CID 145367724.
- Salter, Richard C. (2000). "Time, Authority, and Ethics in the Khmer Rouge: Elements of the Millennial Vision in Year Zero". In Wessinger, Catherine (ed.). Millennialism, Persecution, and Violence: Historical Cases. Syracuse University Press. pp. 281–298. ISBN 978-0-8156-0599-7.
- Williford, Thomas J. (2005), Armando los espiritus: Political Rhetoric in Colombia on the Eve of La Violencia, 1930–1945, Vanderbilt University
- Zuckerman, Phil (2009). Atheism and Secularity. Santa Barbara: ABC-CLIO. ISBN 9780313351822. OCLC 609858051.
- AḴŪND ḴORĀSĀNĪ, Encyclopædia Iranica
- Farzaneh, Mateo Mohammad (March 2015). Iranian Constitutional Revolution and the Clerical Leadership of Khurasani. Syracuse, NY: Syracuse University Press. ISBN 9780815633884. OCLC 931494838.
- Sayej, Caroleen Marji (2018). Patriotic Ayatollahs: Nationalism in Post-Saddam Iraq. Ithaca, NY: Cornell University Press. p. 67. doi:10.7591/cornell/9781501715211.001.0001. ISBN 9781501714856.
- Hermann, Denis (1 May 2013). "Akhund Khurasani and the Iranian Constitutional Movement". Middle Eastern Studies. 49 (3): 430–453. doi:10.1080/00263206.2013.783828. ISSN 0026-3206. JSTOR 23471080. S2CID 143672216.
- Bayat, Mangol (1991). Iran's First Revolution. Oxford University Press. ISBN 978-0-19-506822-1.
