= Your Movement =

Your Movement Twój Ruch
- Founder: Janusz Palikot
- Founded: 1 June 2011 (RP); 6 October 2013 (TR)
- Dissolved: January 2023
- Split from: Civic Platform
- Preceded by: Palikot Movement
- Headquarters: ul. Nowy Świat 39; 00-029 Warsaw
- Ideology: Libertarianism; Neoliberalism; Progressivism; Social liberalism Populism
- Political position: Economic: Right-wing; Sociocultural: Left-wing
- Colours: Orange; Blue

Website
- twojruch.eu
- Politics of Poland; Political parties; Elections; A: The party was variously described as right-wing, centre-right, centrist, centre-left, and left-wing. It mixed economical liberalism (compared to Thatcherism), and social progressivism.

Your Movement (Polish: Twój Ruch, which can also be translated as Your Move, TR) was a social liberal, neoliberal and anti-clerical political party in Poland. The party was founded by Janusz Palikot, a former Civic Platform MP, in October 2010 as Palikot's Movement (Polish: Ruch Palikota, RP). The party was classified as a right-wing, centre-right, centrist, centre-left, or a left-wing party in the context of Polish politics, one which was "struggling with its political identity and finding it difficult to decide whether it was really a left-wing party at all or more of an economically and socially liberal centrist grouping."

It combined "a liberal approach both to matters of world-view and to free market solutions". Palikot's Movement wanted to end religious education in state schools, end state subsidies of churches, legalize abortion on demand, lower the voting age to 16, give out free condoms, allow same-sex marriages, switch to the mixed-member proportional representation system, reform the Social Security Agency, abolish the Senate, legalize cannabis, raise the retirement age, replace free university programs with tuition-based paid ones, and implement flat taxes. The party adopted its revised name and programme on 6 October 2013.

== History ==
=== Origins ===
The party was founded by Janusz Palikot, a Polish millionaire who served as the MP of Civic Platform between 2005 and 2010. During his mandate, he became known for controversial and eccentric stunts; in 2007, he appeared on a television program wearing a t-shirt that read "I am a gay". He also attacked his own party on LGBT issues, arguing that its inaction was more detrimental to LGBT rights than socially conservative parties such as League of Polish Families and Law and Justice were. The same year, he made a press conference wielding a toy gun and a dildo. He would frequently accuse political opponents of being closeted homosexuals, including accusing Roman Giertych of having a "suppressed homosexual passion" and offering 50,000 PLN for anyone who could prove Giertych's purported homosexuality.

In July 2010, Janusz Palikot—then still a member of Civic Platform (PO)—suggested that the late President Lech Kaczyński was himself to blame for the Polish Air Force Tu-154 crash in Smolensk, Russia. In the aftermath of the resulting controversy, Palikot announced plans to create his own social movement. Palikot claimed that Kaczyński "has blood on his hands" and "bears moral responsibility" for the disaster, and in face of the backlash, both from his party and the public, he created his blog where he claimed: "There are 10 million of us! That many people in Poland believe that Lech Kaczyński or his milieu brought about the Smolensk catastrophe" and declared that he would found a movement against "bishops and elites".

On 2 October, he organized the "Modern Poland" congress in Warsaw, attended by several thousand. At the congress, Palikot announced his 15-point program. His 15 postulates included separation of Church and sttae, civil unions for same-sex couples, universal access to the Internet, first-past-the-post elections in Poland (instead of proportional representation, abolition of the Polish Senate, and abolition of parliamentary immunity. His program was described as an "articulation of anti-clericalism, liberalism, and populism".

=== 2011 election ===
On 6 October, Palikot resigned from PO, along with Kazimierz Kutz. On 9 January 2011, Palikot gave his MP ID card to the Great Orchestra of Christmas Charity to be auctioned off. On 1 June 2011, Palikot formally registered his movement as a political party called Palikot Movement (RP). In the October 2011 parliamentary election, the party received 10 percent of the vote and won 40 seats in the Sejm, making it the third party in the chamber behind Civic Platform and Law and Justice (PiS), one of the best debut performances for a party since the end of communism. After the election, one of the MPs of Democratic Left Alliance (SLD), Sławomir Kopyciński, decided to leave his party and join Palikot Movement.

Anna Grodzka, the first ever transgender MP in European history, was elected from the party lists in 2011. Also, Robert Biedroń became the first openly gay MP in Polish political history. One parliamentarian, Roman Kotliński, is a former priest of the Catholic Church. On 8 March 2012, Łukasz Gibała, head of the Krakow structures of the governing PO, joined Palikot Movement, becoming the 43rd MP of the party. His transfer was somewhat significant in that he is the nephew of the Minister of Justice Jarosław Gowin. On 3 February 2013, Palikot Movement and Racja PL started collaboration with Social Democracy of Poland, Labour United and Union of the Left to form an electoral alliance named Europa Plus to contest the upcoming European Parliament elections. The project was led by Marek Siwiec, Aleksander Kwasniewski and Janusz Palikot. On 6 May 2013, Palikot Movement registered its first local party committee abroad, which had been formed by Poles residing in Brussels, Belgium.

=== In the Sejm ===
Once in the Sejm, the party came to be seen as unreliable and untrustworthy. Polish journalist Igor Janke wrote: "Palikot is known to regularly change his mind and opinions – sometimes he voices extreme liberal economic views, sometimes he is a socialist calling for redistribution. Once he was a conservative – now he is a leftist." Marcin Makowski attacked the movement as "capitalist business" which "preferred to fight for free cannabis rather than for a labour market free of predatory job contracts." Palikot came to be seen as "an eccentric libertarian vodka magnate". Jan Lityński stated: "We have a Palikot party that was supposed to be left wing, but it failed because the leader Janusz Palikot did not know himself whether he represents a right-wing or left-wing movement. The Palikot party does not have any long-term program but only short-run initiatives."

From 2012 onwards, Palikot would take "an abrupt leftward turn" by pursuing alliance with left-leaning parties. In February 2012 he wrote a letter to Leszek Miller where he insisted on the "need for an authentic left-wing politics". This culminated on 6 October 2013, when the party was renamed and refounded as Your Movement (TR). Palikot also hired Piotr Ikonowicz, a known socialist activist, as policy advisor. At the same time, he doubled down on free-market, neoliberal policies such as replacing progressive taxation with flat tax. When challenged on mixing neoliberal and left-wing positions, Palikot "we are neither left nor right". The party came to be seen as ideologically incoherent save for anti-clericalism and sociocultural libertarianism.

The party's popularity quickly dwindled; by 2014, the party polled around 3%. Palikot failed to capitalise on his party's success, and the voters increasingly disapproved of what was perceived as his erratic behavior and political inconsistency. The party's aggressively anti-Catholic views provoked a "counter-reformation" movement in Poland, mobilizing Catholics and the right-leaning electorate to halt secularization of the Polish society. This prompted the party to tone down its anti-clericalism and social liberalism and promote free-market economics as an attempt to reinvent the party. The party's 2013 program was seen as very fiscally conservative - it postulated abolition of Social Insurance Institution to "free companies from unnecessary burdens and reduce shadow economy", and a flat 20% VAT rate, which would have increased the VAT rate for food and medicine.

=== Downfall ===
The party founded an electoral alliance Europa Plus together with Labour Union, SDPL and the Union of the Left. On 25 May 2014, in the 2014 European election, Europa Plus received 3.6% of the vote, below the 5% electoral threshold, thus failed to elect any MEPs. On 29 May 2014, Europa Plus was disbanded. In May 2015, Palikot ran in the 2015 Polish presidential election. He won 1.4% of the vote, considered a "derisory" amount given the party's 2011 success.

In July 2015, TR and the SLD, Labour United (UP) and The Greens (PZ) formed the United Left (ZL) electoral alliance to contest the upcoming parliamentary election. The alliance was boycotted by a newly-founded left-wing Razem party, which objected to the presence of liberal elements such as Palikot and his party in the alliance. As a result, Razem ran separately. In the 2015 Polish parliamentary election (held on 25 October 2015), the United Left list was led by Your Movement's Barbara Nowacka and received only 7.6% of the vote, below the 8% threshold, leaving TR without parliamentary representation. Most of TR's voters from 2011 abandoned it in the 2015 election, including 25% of the party's voters defecting to the Kukiz'15 party. Razem won over 3.6% of the vote, which was not enough to cross the 5% electoral threshold, but did suffice for the 3% threshold needed for a party to receive state funding. This left the Sejm without a single nominally left-of-center formation for the first time after 1989.

In December 2017, Palikot announced his retirement from politics. In the 2019 Polish parliamentary election, the party stood under the banner of The Left. The party disbanded in January 2023.

== Ideology ==
Political alignment of post-1989 Polish political parties on a two-dimensional spectrum. Your Movement is coded as TR (RP).

Sources described Palikot Movement as liberal, anti-clerical, and pro-European. Media variously described Palikot Movement as economically liberal, libertarian, liberal, anti-clerical, and populist. The British Financial Times newspaper described the economic views of the Palikot Movement membership as heterogenous, ranging from libertarianism to social democracy. According to the political scientist Aleks Szczerbiak, the party struggled with its political identity and was an economically and socially liberal, centrist party rather than a left-wing one. Political scientist Michał Syska argued that ultimately Your Movement was "related to Thatcherism rather than social democracy in its economic postulates", considering the left-wing label inadequate.

Palikot's Movement was described as a "liberal populist party whose progressive policies on some social and cultural issues are combined with a commitment to neoliberal economic reform." It had a neoliberal economic programme - its most famous economic proposal was introducing flat tax rates instead of the progressive taxation that Poland had at the time. The party also argued that students should pay for their studies and wished to make university tuition paid instead of free. The party supported "liquidating any barriers to business activity", abolition of tax and social security privileges for groups like the farmers, raising the employment age and restricting retirement privileges. It also proposed a creation of a "probusiness parliamentary commission". It was described as "strongly anti-union" and a party that "represents business circles rather than employees". The party supported "one European state", and attacked right-wing parties for obstructing Polish integration into the EU through social conservatism and opposition to the EU climate policy.

The party had a "blatant anti-church program" and rose to prominence by promising to remove the Presidential Palace cross. Socially, it wanted to prohibit religion lessons in schools, eliminate religious symbols in public buildings, and introduce sexual education in schools. It was described as "vehemently anti-clerical". Additionally, it also supported abortion on demand, legalizing soft drugs, and introduction of same-sex civil unions. It also spoke for centralization of Polish administration and government, as it sought to reduce the number of Sejm seats, eliminate the Senate, and decrease the number of councilors of the local government, while liquidating some branches of local government completely. It also proposed a ban on the participation of the clergy in state ceremonies.

Your Movement was described as social-liberal, anti-clerical and pro-European. Anti-clericalism was considered the core belief of the party - it was also described as anti-Catholic and antireligious. The party placed an emphasis upon supporting LGBT rights. At the same time, the party's commitment to social progressivism was called into question - the leader of the party, Janusz Palikot, suggested that the Polish feminist activist and MP Wanda Nowicka "perhaps desired to be raped" when she refused to step down from her post. Its ideology was considered a type of liberal populism that combined economic liberalism with social progressivism, which often isolated the party from left-wing parties such as the social-democratic SLD.

== Election results ==
=== Sejm ===
Election	Leader(s)	Votes	%	Seats	Change	Government
2011	Janusz Palikot	1,439,490	10.0	40 / 460	New	PO-PSL
2015	Janusz Palikot; Barbara Nowacka	1,147,102	7.6	0 / 460	▼40	PiS
2015	As part of the United Left, which did not win any seats.					
2019	Marzenna Karkoszka; Kamil Żebrowski	2,319,946	12.6	0 / 460	Steady	PiS
2019	As part of The Left, which won 49 seats in total.					

=== Presidential ===
Election year	Candidate	1st round		2nd round	
Election year	Candidate	# of overall votes	% of overall vote	# of overall votes	% of overall vote
2015	Janusz Palikot	211,242	1.42 (#7)		

=== European Parliament ===
Election	Leader	Votes	%	Seats	Change
2014	Janusz Palikot	252,699	3.6	0 / 51	New
2014	As part of the Europa Plus-Your Movement, which did not win any seats.				

== See also ==
- Civil libertarianism
- Drug liberalization
- LGBT rights in Poland
- Polish Initiative
- Secular humanism
- Secular liberalism
