= Reason Party (Poland) =

RACJA Polskiej Lewicy
- Leader: Jan Cedzyński
- Founded: 8 August 2002
- Dissolved: 23 November 2013
- Merged into: Your Movement
- Headquarters: ul. Emilii Plater 55/81, 00-113 Warsaw
- Ideology: Social democracy Anti-clericalism
- Political position: Centre-left

Website
- www.racja.eu

Reason of the Polish Left, or Reason Party (Polish: RACJA Polskiej Lewicy; RACJA; RACJA PL), was an anti-clerical minor political party in Poland. It was registered on 8 August 2002, as the "Anticlerical Party of Progress REASON" (Antyklerykalna Partia Postępu RACJA, APP RACJA) and adopted its later name on 14 January 2006.

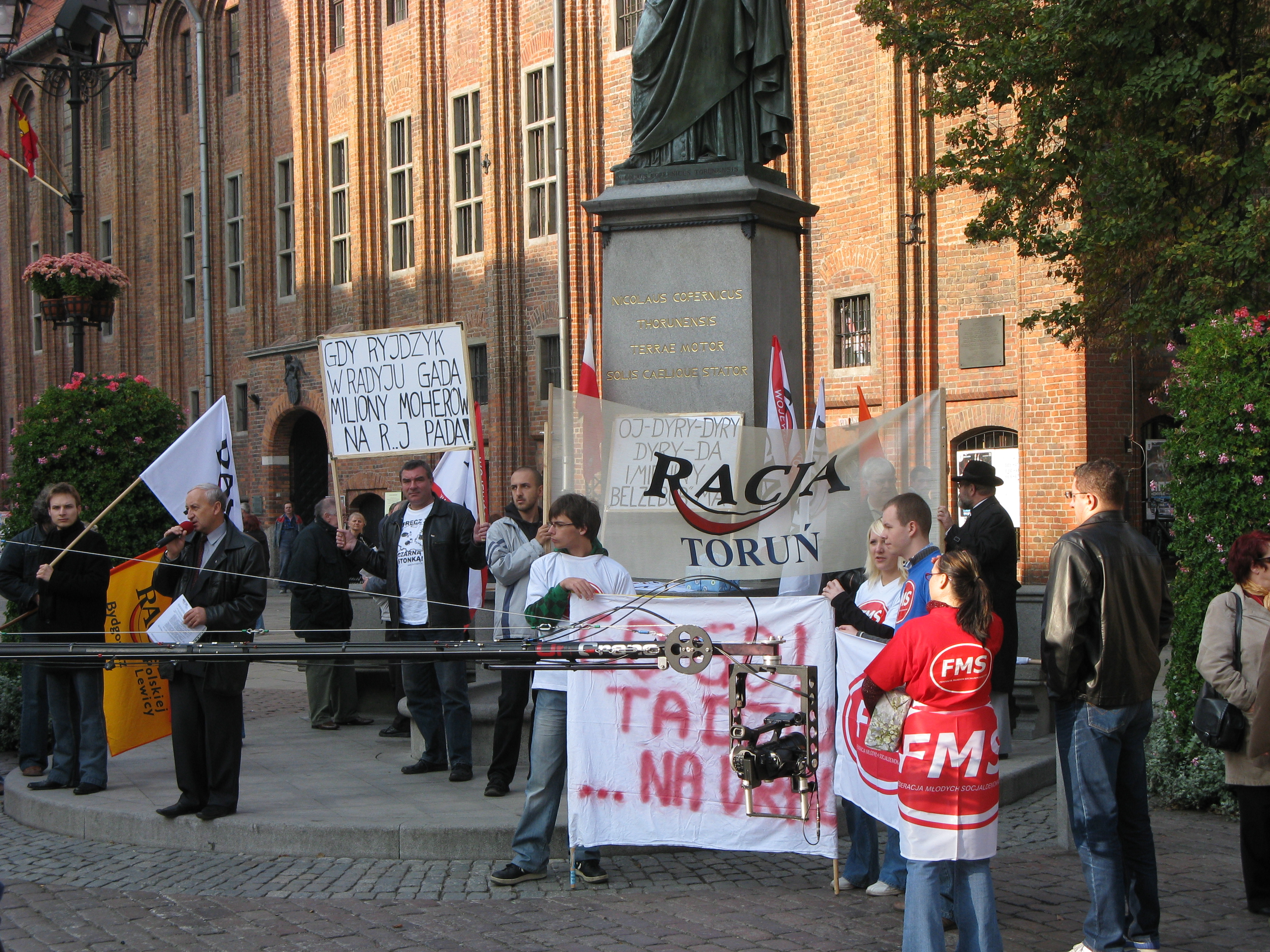
Anti-clerical demonstration in Toruń, 2008

The party opposed the involvement of the Roman Catholic Church in state affairs, the teaching of religion in schools, and state financial support for the Roman Catholic Church in Poland.

The Party believed in the separation of church and state, the promotion of the role of women in public life, the introduction of sex education in schools, state support for contraception, legalized abortion and euthanasia, tolerance toward social minorities, and the legal recognition of same-sex relationships through civil unions.

The Party supported free public health care, an increase in tax revenues, improvement in economic conditions for businesses, and reduction of unemployment. The Party supported Poland’s membership in NATO.

In June 2005 the Party endorsed Senator Maria Szyszkowska as its candidate in the 2005 presidential election.

== See also ==
- Religion in Poland
