= 2005 Italian fertility laws referendum =

- 12 June 2005

Scrapping limitations on clinical and experimental research on embryos
Yes	88.0%
No	12.0%
Proposal failed as voter turnout was below 50%

Scrapping limits on access to research on embryos
Yes	88.8%
No	11.2%
Proposal failed as voter turnout was below 50%

Scrapping the legal definition of embryos as people
Yes	87.7%
No	12.3%
Proposal failed as voter turnout was below 50%

Allowing IVF treatment with donated eggs or sperm
Yes	78.2%
No	21.8%
Proposal failed as voter turnout was below 50%

A four-part abrogative referendum on fertility laws was held in Italy on 12 June 2005. Voters were asked whether research and access to the research on embryos should no longer be limited, whether embryos should no longer be legally recognised as people and whether IVF treatment should no longer be limited to three embryos. The referendum was called after the Italian Radicals collected the 500,000 signatures required. Although all four proposals were approved by wide margins, the voter turnout of 26% was well below the 50% threshold and the results were invalidated. Pope Benedict XVI had called for a boycott.

== Results ==
=== Scrapping limitations on clinical and experimental research on embryos ===
Choice	Votes	%
Yes	10,743,710	88.0
No	1,461,217	12.0
Invalid/blank votes	532,691	–
Total	12,737,618	100
Registered voters/turnout	49,648,425	25.7
Source: Nohlen & Stöver

=== Scrapping limits on access to research on embryos ===
Choice	Votes	%
Yes	10,819,909	88.8
No	1,367,288	11.2
Invalid/blank votes	551,200	–
Total	12,738,397	100
Registered voters/turnout	49,648,425	25.7
Source: Nohlen & Stöver

=== Scrapping the legal definition of embryos as people ===
Choice	Votes	%
Yes	10,663,125	87.7
No	1,492,042	12.3
Invalid/blank votes	579,766	–
Total	12,734,933	100
Registered voters/turnout	49,648,425	25.7
Source: Nohlen & Stöver

=== Allowing IVF treatment with donated eggs or sperm ===
Choice	Votes	%
Yes	9,391,161	78.2
No	2,744,895	21.8
Invalid/blank votes	590,080	–
Total	12,726,136	100
Registered voters/turnout	49,648,425	25.6
Source: Nohlen & Stöver
