= 9th term Sejm and 10th term Senate of Poland =

Legislature of the Republic of Poland

9th term Sejm & 10th term Senate of the Republic of Poland
←	8th term Sejm and 9th term Senate	10th term Sejm and 11th term Senate	→
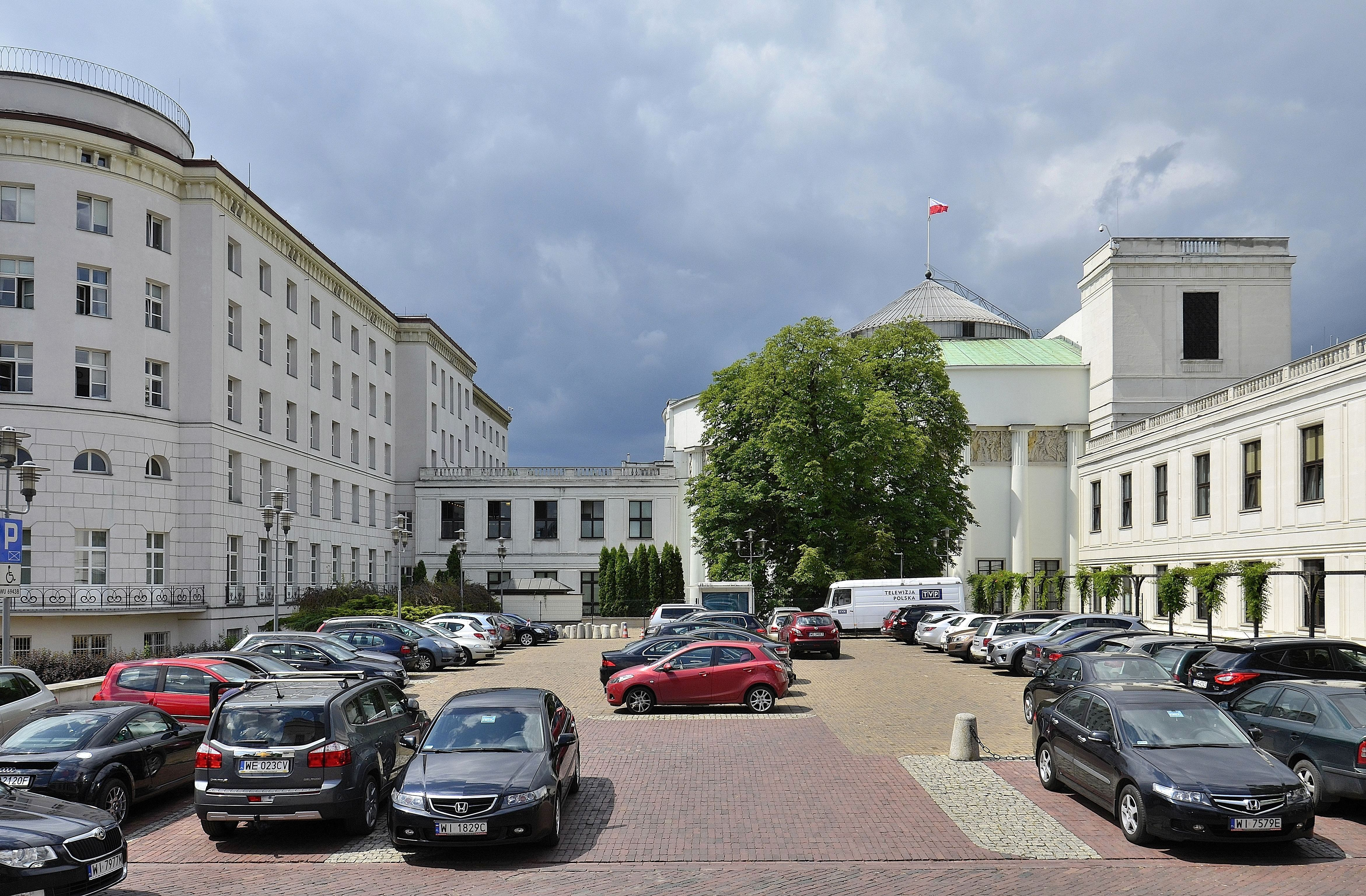
- Sejm and Senate Complex of Poland

Overview
- Meeting place: Sejm building complex, Warsaw, Poland
- Term: 12 November 2019 – 12 November 2023
- Election: 13 October 2019
- Government: Morawiecki II Law and Justice
- Opposition: Civic Coalition; Polish Coalition; Lewica; Poland 2050 (from 2020); Confederation; Democratic Left Association (from 2022); Kukiz'15 (until 2021); Polish Affairs (from 2021)
- Website: sejm.gov.pl senat.gov.pl

9th term Sejm
- Members: 460 deputies
- Marshal of the Sejm: Elżbieta Barbara Witek, PiS
- Deputy Marshals of the Sejm: Włodzimierz Czarzasty, NL; Małgorzata Maria Kidawa-Błońska, PO; Piotr Zgorzelski, PSL; Ryszard Iwon Terlecki, PiS; Małgorzata Maria Gosiewska, PiS
- Party control: Law and Justice Majority

10th term Senate
- Members: 100 Senators
- Marshal of the Senate: Tomasz Paweł Grodzki, PO
- Deputy Marshals of the Senate: Bogdan Michał Borusewicz, PO; Michał Tomasz Kamiński, UED; Stanisław Karczewski, PiS; Gabriela Anna Morawska-Stanecka, Lewica
- Party control: No overall control (oppositional Majority)

The 9th term Sejm and the 10th term Senate was the legislature of the Republic of Poland following the 2019 Polish parliamentary election held on 13 October 2019 which returned 460 deputies to the Sejm and 100 senators to the Senate.

The Parliament of Poland held its inaugural meeting on 12 November 2019. Its term ended on 12 November 2023.

== Standings history ==
Standings in the 9th Sejm and the 10th Senate
Affiliation	Deputies (Sejm)			Senators (Senate)		
Affiliation	Results of the 2019 election	As of 20 August 2023	Change	Results of the 2019 election	As of 20 August 2023	Change
Parliamentary clubs
Law and Justice	235	227	▼8	48	46	▼2
Civic Coalition	134	129	▼5	43	40	▼3
The Left	49	43	▼6	2	1	▼1
Polish Coalition; Polish Coal. Senators' Group	30	27	▼3	3	4	▲1
Parliamentary groups
Poland 2050	—	6	▲6	—	1	▲1
Deputies' groups
Confederation	11	11	Steady	—	—	Steady
Democratic Left Association	—	3	▲3	—	—	Steady
Kukiz'15	—	3	▲3	—	—	Steady
Polish Affairs	—	3	▲3	—	—	Steady
Senators' groups
Ind. Senators Group	—	—	Steady	—	3	▲3
Non-inscrits/Independents
Independents	1	8	▲7	4	3	▼1
Total members	460	460	Steady	100	98	▼2
Vacant	—	0	Steady	—	2	▲2
Total Seats	460			100		

=== List of Parliamentary clubs and circles ===
Parliamentary Group	Chair	Type	# of deputies	# of senators
Law and Justice	Ryszard Terlecki	Parliamentary club	234	48
Civic Coalition	Borys Budka (in the Sejm)	Parliamentary club	134	43
Civic Coalition	Leszek Czarnobaj (in the Senate)	Parliamentary club	134	43
The Left	Krzysztof Gawkowski	Parliamentary club	49	2
Polish Coalition	Władysław Kosiniak-Kamysz	Parliamentary club	30	0^{†}
Confederation	Jakub Kulesza	Deputies' circle	11	—
Ind. Senators Circle	Lidia Staroń	Senators' circle	—	3
Polish Coalition in the Senate	Ryszard Bober	Senators' circle	—	0

^{†}Parliamentary group no longer represented in the Senate. Polish Coalition Senators are in a group independent of the Parliamentary club

== 9th term Sejm ==
=== List of political officers ===
Office	Holder	Since
Marshal of the Sejm	Elżbieta Barbara Witek	12 November 2019
Deputy Marshals of the Sejm	Włodzimierz Czarzasty	12 November 2019
Deputy Marshals of the Sejm	Małgorzata Maria Kidawa-Błońska	12 November 2019
Deputy Marshals of the Sejm	Piotr Zgorzelski	12 November 2019
Deputy Marshals of the Sejm	Ryszard Iwon Terlecki	12 November 2019
Deputy Marshals of the Sejm	Małgorzata Maria Gosiewska	12 November 2019
Senior Marshal	Antoni Macierewicz	12 November 2019

=== List of deputies ===
==== 1 – Legnica ====
Deputy	Portrait	Party	Electoral Committee	Parliamentary Group	Number of votes
Elżbieta Witek		Law and Justice	Law and Justice	Law and Justice	46 171
Małgorzata Sekuła-Szmajdzińska		Democratic Left Alliance	The Left	The Left	41 480
Piotr Borys		Civic Platform	Civic Coalition	Civic Coalition	35 064
Adam Lipiński		Law and Justice	Law and Justice	Law and Justice	33 269
Krzysztof Kubów		Law and Justice	Law and Justice	Law and Justice	23 834
Marzena Machałek		Law and Justice	Law and Justice	Law and Justice	22 481
Zofia Czernow		Civic Platform	Civic Coalition	Civic Coalition	15 761
Robert Kropiwnicki		Civic Platform	Civic Coalition	Civic Coalition	14 714
Wojciech Zubowski		Law and Justice	Law and Justice	Law and Justice	12 868
Ewa Szymańska		Law and Justice	Law and Justice	Law and Justice	8 930
Stanisław Żuk		Kukiz'15	Polish Coalition	Polish Coalition	7 694
Robert Obaz		Spring	The Left	The Left	4 205

==== 2 – Wałbrzych ====
Deputy	Portrait	Party	Electoral Committee	Parliamentary Group	Number of votes
Michał Dworczyk		Law and Justice	Law and Justice	Law and Justice	58 426
Tomasz Siemoniak		Civic Platform	Civic Coalition	Civic Coalition	45 395
Monika Wielichowska		Civic Platform	Civic Coalition	Civic Coalition	15 399
Marek Dyduch		Democratic Left Alliance	The Left	The Left	14 451
Izabela Mrzygłocka		Civic Platform	Civic Coalition	Civic Coalition	11 987
Ireneusz Zyska		Law and Justice	Law and Justice	Law and Justice	10 688
Marcin Gwóźdź		Law and Justice	Law and Justice	Law and Justice	8 049
Wojciech Murdzek		Agreement	Law and Justice	Law and Justice	6 354

==== 3 – Wrocław ====
Deputy	Portrait	Party	Electoral Committee	Parliamentary Group	Number of votes
Mirosława Stachowiak-Różecka		Law and Justice	Law and Justice	Law and Justice	91 236
Grzegorz Schetyna		Civic Platform	Civic Coalition	Civic Coalition	66 859
Krzysztof Śmiszek		Spring	The Left	The Left	43 447
Michał Jaros		Civic Platform	Civic Coalition	Civic Coalition	30 196
Małgorzata Tracz		The Greens	Civic Coalition	Civic Coalition	28 676
Krzysztof Tuduj		National Movement	Confederation	Confederation	19 617
Przemysław Czarnecki		Law and Justice	Law and Justice	Law and Justice	19 413
Jacek Protasiewicz		Union of European Democrats	Polish Coalition	Polish Coalition	17 618
Jacek Świat		Law and Justice	Law and Justice	Law and Justice	15 537
Paweł Hreniak		Law and Justice	Law and Justice	Law and Justice	15 166
Sławomir Piechota		Civic Platform	Civic Coalition	Civic Coalition	14 844
Agnieszka Soin		Law and Justice	Law and Justice	Law and Justice	14 716
Agnieszka Dziemianowicz-Bąk		Spring	The Left	The Left	14 257
Krzysztof Mieszkowski		Modern	Civic Coalition	Civic Coalition	13 814

==== 4 – Bydgoszcz ====
Deputy	Portrait	Party	Electoral Committee	Parliamentary Group	Number of votes
Tomasz Latos		Law and Justice	Law and Justice	Law and Justice	60 132
Tadeusz Zwiefka		Civic Platform	Civic Coalition	Civic Coalition	39 984
Paweł Olszewski		Civic Platform	Civic Coalition	Civic Coalition	35 762
Krzysztof Gawkowski		Spring	The Left	The Left	30 859
Łukasz Schreiber		Law and Justice	Law and Justice	Law and Justice	30 053
Dariusz Kurzawa		Polish People's Party	Polish Coalition	Polish Coalition	17 648
Magdalena Łośko		Civic Platform	Civic Coalition	Civic Coalition	14 407
Ewa Kozanecka		Law and Justice	Law and Justice	Law and Justice	13 305
Bartosz Kownacki		Law and Justice	Law and Justice	Law and Justice	12 414
Jan Szopiński		Democratic Left Alliance	The Left	The Left	11 821
Piotr Król		Law and Justice	Law and Justice	Law and Justice	10 418
Iwona Kozłowska		Independent	Civic Coalition	Civic Coalition	9 325

==== 5 – Toruń ====
Deputy	Portrait	Party	Electoral Committee	Parliamentary Group	Number of votes
Jan Krzysztof Ardanowski		Law and Justice	Law and Justice	Law and Justice	76 267
Arkadiusz Myrcha		Civic Platform	Civic Coalition	Civic Coalition	32 439
Joanna Scheuring-Wielgus		Spring	The Left	The Left	26 092
Tomasz Lenz		Civic Platform	Civic Coalition	Civic Coalition	26 044
Anna Gembicka		Law and Justice	Law and Justice	Law and Justice	15 305
Joanna Borowiak		Law and Justice	Law and Justice	Law and Justice	15 200
Paweł Szramka		Kukiz'15	Polish Coalition	Polish Coalition	14 404
Robert Kwiatkowski		SLD	The Left	The Left	13 940
Zbigniew Girzyński		Law and Justice	Law and Justice	Law and Justice	12 293
Tomasz Szymański		Civic Platform	Civic Coalition	Civic Coalition	11 845
Iwona Michałek		Agreement	Law and Justice	Law and Justice	11 130
Mariusz Kałużny		United Poland	Law and Justice	Law and Justice	10 984
Iwona Hartwich		Independent	Civic Coalition	Civic Coalition	10 865

==== 6 – Lublin ====
Deputy	Portrait	Party	Electoral Committee	Parliamentary Group	Number of votes
Przemysław Czarnek		Law and Justice	Law and Justice	Law and Justice	87 343
Joanna Mucha		Civic Platform / Poland 2050	Civic Coalition / Poland 2050	Civic Coalition	57 577
Sylwester Tułajew		Law and Justice	Law and Justice	Law and Justice	54 915
Artur Soboń		Law and Justice	Law and Justice	Law and Justice	28 381
Jakub Kulesza		Confederation	Confederation	Confederation	24 406
Jacek Czerniak		Democratic Left Alliance	The Left	The Left	17 720
Sławomir Skwarek		Law and Justice	Law and Justice	Law and Justice	15 544
Marta Wcisło		Civic Platform	Civic Coalition	Civic Coalition	15 062
Gabriela Masłowska		Independent	Law and Justice	Law and Justice	14 446
Kazimierz Choma		Law and Justice	Law and Justice	Law and Justice	13 777
Jan Łopata		Polish People's Party	Polish Coalition	Polish Coalition	13 346
Jan Kanthak		Independent	Law and Justice	Law and Justice	12 803
Jerzy Bielecki		Law and Justice	Law and Justice	Law and Justice	10 286
Krzysztof Szulowski		Law and Justice	Law and Justice	Law and Justice	9 764
Michał Krawczyk		Civic Platform	Civic Coalition	Civic Coalition	8 408

==== 7 – Chełm ====
Deputy	Portrait	Party	Electoral Committee	Parliamentary Group	Number of votes
Jacek Sasin		Law and Justice	Law and Justice	Law and Justice	91 241
Sławomir Zawiślak		Law and Justice	Law and Justice	Law and Justice	24 346
Riad Haidar		Independent	Civic Coalition	Civic Coalition	21 483
Marcin Duszek		Law and Justice	Law and Justice	Law and Justice	16 017
Krzysztof Grabczuk		Civic Platform	Civic Coalition	Civic Coalition	15 452
Dariusz Stefaniuk		Law and Justice	Law and Justice	Law and Justice	15 070
Anna Dąbrowska-Banaszek		Independent	Law and Justice	Law and Justice	13 787
Monika Pawłowska		Spring	The Left	The Left	12 916
Jarosław Sachajko		Independent	Polish Coalition	Polish Coalition	10 651
Tomasz Zieliński		Law and Justice	Law and Justice	Law and Justice	10 207
Teresa Hałas		Law and Justice	Law and Justice	Law and Justice	8 622
Beata Strzałka		Law and Justice	Law and Justice	Law and Justice	7 785

==== 8 – Zielona Góra ====
Deputy	Portrait	Party	Electoral Committee	Parliamentary Group	Number of votes
Marek Ast		Law and Justice	Law and Justice	Law and Justice	36 073
Anita Kucharska-Dziedzic		Spring	The Left	The Left	30 581
Waldemar Sługocki		Civic Platform	Civic Coalition	Civic Coalition	29 580
Władysław Dajczak		Law and Justice	Law and Justice	Law and Justice	27 393
Tomasz Aniśko		The Greens	Civic Coalition	Civic Coalition	23 870
Jerzy Materna		Law and Justice	Law and Justice	Law and Justice	22 729
Bogusław Wontor		Democratic Left Alliance	The Left	The Left	18 950
Krystyna Sibińska		Civic Platform	Civic Coalition	Civic Coalition	16 089
Krystian Kamiński		National Movement	Confederation	Confederation	14 251
Jolanta Fedak		Polish People's Party	Polish Coalition	Polish Coalition	13 792
Katarzyna Osos		Civic Platform	Civic Coalition	Civic Coalition	11 619
Elżbieta Płonka		Law and Justice	Law and Justice	Law and Justice	10 918

==== 9 – Łódź ====
Deputy	Portrait	Party	Electoral Committee	Parliamentary Group	Number of votes
Waldemar Buda		Law and Justice	Law and Justice	Law and Justice	50 114
Tomasz Zimoch		Independent	Civic Coalition	Civic Coalition	47 648
Piotr Gliński		Law and Justice	Law and Justice	Law and Justice	43 626
Tomasz Trela		Democratic Left Alliance	The Left	The Left	40 811
Krzysztof Piątkowski		Civic Platform	Civic Coalition	Civic Coalition	25 663
Iwona Śledzińska-Katarasińska		Civic Platform	Civic Coalition	Civic Coalition	17 254
Hanna Gill-Piątek		Spring	The Left	The Left	14 422
Małgorzata Niemczyk		Civic Platform	Civic Coalition	Civic Coalition	13 421
Włodzimierz Tomaszewski		Agreement	Law and Justice	Law and Justice	6 884
Zbigniew Rau		Independent	Law and Justice	Law and Justice	6 833

==== 10 – Piotrków Trybunalski ====
Deputy	Portrait	Party	Electoral Committee	Parliamentary Group	Number of votes
Antoni Macierewicz		Law and Justice	Law and Justice	Law and Justice	31 280
Robert Telus		Law and Justice	Law and Justice	Law and Justice	27 254
Grzegorz Wojciechowski		Law and Justice	Law and Justice	Law and Justice	25 575
Anna Milczanowska		Law and Justice	Law and Justice	Law and Justice	20 451
Grzegorz Lorek		Law and Justice	Law and Justice	Law and Justice	18 238
Cezary Grabarczyk		Civic Platform	Civic Coalition	Civic Coalition	16 357
Dariusz Klimczak		Polish People's Party	Polish Coalition	Polish Coalition	15 977
Anita Sowińska		Spring	The Left	The Left	13 023
Małgorzata Janowska		Law and Justice	Law and Justice	Law and Justice	11 599

==== 11 – Sieradz ====
Deputy	Portrait	Party	Electoral Committee	Parliamentary Group	Number of votes
Joanna Lichocka		Law and Justice	Law and Justice	Law and Justice	45 823
Cezary Tomczyk		Civic Platform	Civic Coalition	Civic Coalition	44 217
Piotr Polak		Law and Justice	Law and Justice	Law and Justice	34 056
Paweł Rychlik		Law and Justice	Law and Justice	Law and Justice	25 246
Tomasz Rzymkowski		Independent	Law and Justice	Law and Justice	20 752
Tadeusz Woźniak		United Poland	Law and Justice	Law and Justice	17 923
Paulina Matysiak		Left Together	The Left	The Left	16 757
Paweł Bejda		Polish People's Party	Polish Coalition	Polish Coalition	14 161
Marek Matuszewski		Law and Justice	Law and Justice	Law and Justice	13 392
Beata Mateusiak-Pielucha		Law and Justice	Law and Justice	Law and Justice	13 030
Dariusz Joński		Polish Initiative	Civic Coalition	Civic Coalition	11 999
Agnieszka Hanajczyk		Civic Platform	Civic Coalition	Civic Coalition	10 535

==== 12 – Kraków I ====
Deputy	Portrait	Party	Electoral Committee	Parliamentary Group	Number of votes
Rafał Bochenek		Independent	Law and Justice	Law and Justice	46 816
Dorota Niedziela		Civic Platform	Civic Coalition	Civic Coalition	22 013
Marek Sowa		Civic Platform	Civic Coalition	Civic Coalition	18 597
Marek Polak		Law and Justice	Law and Justice	Law and Justice	16 130
Filip Kaczyński		Law and Justice	Law and Justice	Law and Justice	14 731
Ewa Filipiak		Law and Justice	Law and Justice	Law and Justice	14 010
Krzysztof Kozik		Law and Justice	Law and Justice	Law and Justice	12 460
Władysław Kurowski		Independent	Law and Justice	Law and Justice	10 525

==== 13 – Kraków II ====
Deputy	Portrait	Party	Electoral Committee	Parliamentary Group	Number of votes
Małgorzata Wassermann		Independent	Law and Justice	Law and Justice	140 692
Paweł Kowal		Independent	Civic Coalition	Civic Coalition	76 720
Konrad Berkowicz		KORWiN	Confederation	Confederation	36 428
Maciej Gdula		Independent	The Left	The Left	35 279
Andrzej Adamczyk		Law and Justice	Law and Justice	Law and Justice	29 686
Agnieszka Ścigaj		Independent	Polish Coalition	Polish Coalition	20 877
Ireneusz Raś		Civic Platform	Civic Coalition	Civic Coalition	18 203
Daria Gosek-Popiołek		Left Together	The Left	The Left	17 488
Bogusław Sonik		Civic Platform	Civic Coalition	Civic Coalition	17 465
Aleksander Miszalski		Civic Platform	Civic Coalition	Civic Coalition	15 987
Jarosław Gowin		Agreement	Law and Justice	Law and Justice	15 802
Jacek Osuch		Law and Justice	Law and Justice	Law and Justice	12 150
Ryszard Terlecki		Law and Justice	Law and Justice	Law and Justice	10 327
Elżbieta Duda		Law and Justice	Law and Justice	Law and Justice	8 298

==== 14 – Nowy Sącz ====
Deputy	Portrait	Party	Electoral Committee	Parliamentary Group	Number of votes
Arkadiusz Mularczyk		Law and Justice	Law and Justice	Law and Justice	72 660
Barbara Bartuś		Law and Justice	Law and Justice	Law and Justice	23 468
Jagna Marczułajtis-Walczak		Civic Platform	Civic Coalition	Civic Coalition	21 968
Edward Siarka		United Poland	Law and Justice	Law and Justice	21 561
Anna Paluch		Law and Justice	Law and Justice	Law and Justice	20 908
Wiesław Janczyk		Law and Justice	Law and Justice	Law and Justice	16 305
Andrzej Gut-Mostowy		Agreement	Law and Justice	Law and Justice	12 437
Jan Duda		Law and Justice	Law and Justice	Law and Justice	11 579
Urszula Nowogórska		Polish People's Party	Polish Coalition	Polish Coalition	11 499
Patryk Wicher		Law and Justice	Law and Justice	Law and Justice	10 900

==== 15 – Tarnów ====
Deputy	Portrait	Party	Electoral Committee	Parliamentary Group	Number of votes
Anna Pieczarka		Law and Justice	Law and Justice	Law and Justice	75 220
Władysław Kosiniak-Kamysz		Polish People's Party	Polish Coalition	Polish Coalition	33 784
Józefa Szczurek-Żelazko		Law and Justice	Law and Justice	Law and Justice	25 323
Urszula Augustyn		Civic Platform	Civic Coalition	Civic Coalition	20 120
Urszula Rusecka		Law and Justice	Law and Justice	Law and Justice	18 321
Wiesław Krajewski		Law and Justice	Law and Justice	Law and Justice	16 719
Stanisław Bukowiec		Law and Justice	Law and Justice	Law and Justice	12 449
Norbert Kaczmarczyk		Independent	Law and Justice	Law and Justice	12 164
Piotr Sak		United Poland	Law and Justice	Law and Justice	9 855

==== 16 – Płock ====
Deputy	Portrait	Party	Electoral Committee	Parliamentary Group	Number of votes
Łukasz Szumowski		Independent	Law and Justice	Law and Justice	35 798
Maciej Małecki		Law and Justice	Law and Justice	Law and Justice	34 086
Marcin Kierwiński		Civic Platform	Civic Coalition	Civic Coalition	30 013
Jacek Ozdoba		Independent	Law and Justice	Law and Justice	17 873
Piotr Zgorzelski		Polish People's Party	Polish Coalition	Polish Coalition	16 775
Arkadiusz Iwaniak		Democratic Left Alliance	The Left	The Left	15 098
Maciej Wąsik		Law and Justice	Law and Justice	Law and Justice	14 280
Marek Opioła		Law and Justice	Law and Justice	Law and Justice	14 111
Anna Cicholska		Law and Justice	Law and Justice	Law and Justice	13 133
Elżbieta Gapińska		Civic Platform	Civic Coalition	Civic Coalition	10 905

==== 17 – Radom ====
Deputy	Portrait	Party	Electoral Committee	Parliamentary Group	Number of votes
Marek Suski		Law and Justice	Law and Justice	Law and Justice	69 141
Radosław Fogiel		Law and Justice	Law and Justice	Law and Justice	26 707
Anna Kwiecień		Independent	Law and Justice	Law and Justice	23 670
Joanna Kluzik-Rostkowska		Civic Platform	Civic Coalition	Civic Coalition	19 320
Mirosław Maliszewski		Polish People's Party	Polish Coalition	Polish Coalition	12 752
Andrzej Kosztowniak		Law and Justice	Law and Justice	Law and Justice	12 619
Dariusz Bąk		Independent	Law and Justice	Law and Justice	12 494
Konrad Frysztak		Civic Platform	Civic Coalition	Civic Coalition	11 996
Agnieszka Górska		Law and Justice	Law and Justice	Law and Justice	9 134

==== 18 – Siedlce ====
Deputy	Portrait	Party	Electoral Committee	Parliamentary Group	Number of votes
Krzysztof Tchórzewski		Law and Justice	Law and Justice	Law and Justice	62 891
Henryk Kowalczyk		Law and Justice	Law and Justice	Law and Justice	50 680
Daniel Milewski		Law and Justice	Law and Justice	Law and Justice	40 152
Kamila Gasiuk-Pihowicz		Civic Platform	Civic Coalition	Civic Coalition	34 793
Arkadiusz Czartoryski		Law and Justice	Law and Justice	Law and Justice	22 457
Grzegorz Woźniak		Law and Justice	Law and Justice	Law and Justice	19 082
Marek Sawicki		Polish People's Party	Polish Coalition	Polish Coalition	18 950
Czesław Mroczek		Civic Platform	Civic Coalition	Civic Coalition	11 043
Teresa Wargocka		Law and Justice	Law and Justice	Law and Justice	10 767
Marek Zagórski		Law and Justice	Law and Justice	Law and Justice	9 143
Anna Siarkowska		Republican Party	Law and Justice	Law and Justice	7 313
Maciej Górski		Law and Justice	Law and Justice	Law and Justice	5 206

==== 19 – Warsaw I ====
Deputy	Portrait	Party	Electoral Committee	Parliamentary Group	Number of votes
Małgorzata Kidawa-Błońska		Civic Platform	Civic Coalition	Civic Coalition	416 030
Jarosław Kaczyński		Law and Justice	Law and Justice	Law and Justice	248 935
Adrian Zandberg		Left Together	The Left	The Left	140 898
Janusz Korwin-Mikke		Confederation	Confederation	Confederation	60 385
Władysław Teofil Bartoszewski		Independent	Polish Coalition	Polish Coalition	30 405
Katarzyna Lubnauer		Modern	Civic Coalition	Civic Coalition	28 205
Dariusz Rosati		Independent	Civic Coalition	Civic Coalition	25 061
Mariusz Kamiński		Law and Justice	Law and Justice	Law and Justice	19 797
Magdalena Biejat		Left Together	The Left	The Left	19 501
Anna Maria Żukowska		Democratic Left Alliance	The Left	The Left	18 864
Sebastian Kaleta		Law and Justice	Law and Justice	Law and Justice	17 459
Jarosław Krajewski		Law and Justice	Law and Justice	Law and Justice	15 121
Michał Szczerba		Civic Platform	Civic Coalition	Civic Coalition	13 747
Paweł Lisiecki		Law and Justice	Law and Justice	Law and Justice	13 093
Małgorzata Gosiewska		Law and Justice	Law and Justice	Law and Justice	12 693
Aleksandra Gajewska		Civic Platform	Civic Coalition	Civic Coalition	10 228
Katarzyna Piekarska		Civic Platform	Civic Coalition	Civic Coalition	8 780
Urszula Zielińska		The Greens	Civic Coalition	Civic Coalition	7 536
Klaudia Jachira		Independent	Civic Coalition	Civic Coalition	6 434
Joanna Fabisiak		Civic Platform	Civic Coalition	Civic Coalition	5 347

==== 20 – Warsaw II ====
Deputy	Portrait	Party	Electoral Committee	Parliamentary Group	Number of votes
Mariusz Błaszczak		Law and Justice	Law and Justice	Law and Justice	135 189
Jan Grabiec		Civic Platform	Civic Coalition	Civic Coalition	64 255
Andrzej Rozenek		Democratic Left Alliance	The Left	The Left	38 495
Kinga Gajewska		Civic Platform	Civic Coalition	Civic Coalition	35 912
Anita Czerwińska		Law and Justice	Law and Justice	Law and Justice	22 911
Maciej Lasek		Independent	Civic Coalition	Civic Coalition	15 804
Piotr Uściński		Law and Justice	Law and Justice	Law and Justice	13 665
Paweł Zalewski		Civic Platform	Civic Coalition	Civic Coalition	12 248
Dominika Chorosińska		Independent	Law and Justice	Law and Justice	9 596
Bożena Żelazowska		Polish People's Party	Polish Coalition	Polish Coalition	8 665
Zdzisław Sipiera		Law and Justice	Law and Justice	Law and Justice	8 131
Dariusz Olszewski		United Poland	Law and Justice	Law and Justice	7 454

==== 21 – Opole ====
Deputy	Portrait	Party	Electoral Committee	Parliamentary Group	Number of votes
Witold Zembaczyński		Modern	Civic Coalition	Civic Coalition	40 022
Violetta Porowska		Law and Justice	Law and Justice	Law and Justice	38 583
Paweł Kukiz		Independent	Polish Coalition	Polish Coalition	23 468
Katarzyna Czochara		Law and Justice	Law and Justice	Law and Justice	23 120
Janusz Kowalski		Independent	Law and Justice	Law and Justice	20 973
Marcelina Zawisza		Left Together	The Left	The Left	19 206
Tomasz Kostuś		Civic Platform	Civic Coalition	Civic Coalition	17 026
Kamil Bortniczuk		Agreement	Law and Justice	Law and Justice	16 953
Marcin Ociepa		Agreement	Law and Justice	Law and Justice	16 066
Ryszard Galla		Regional. Minority with a majority.	German Minority	Non-inscrit	13 957
Rajmund Miller		Civic Platform	Civic Coalition	Civic Coalition	8 820
Ryszard Wilczyński		Civic Platform	Civic Coalition	Civic Coalition	6 436

==== 22 – Krosno ====
Deputy	Portrait	Party	Electoral Committee	Parliamentary Group	Number of votes
Marek Kuchciński		Law and Justice	Law and Justice	Law and Justice	61 262
Anna Schmidt-Rodziewicz		Law and Justice	Law and Justice	Law and Justice	26 246
Piotr Uruski		United Poland	Law and Justice	Law and Justice	20 740
Maria Kurowska		United Poland	Law and Justice	Law and Justice	18 936
Joanna Frydrych		Civic Platform	Civic Coalition	Civic Coalition	18 623
Piotr Babinetz		Law and Justice	Law and Justice	Law and Justice	13 360
Teresa Pamuła		Law and Justice	Law and Justice	Law and Justice	12 905
Mieczysław Kasprzak		Polish People's Party	Polish Coalition	Polish Coalition	11 363
Adam Śnieżek		Law and Justice	Law and Justice	Law and Justice	11 260
Tadeusz Chrzan		Law and Justice	Law and Justice	Law and Justice	11 177
Marek Rząsa		Civic Platform	Civic Coalition	Civic Coalition	10 555

==== 23 – Rzeszów ====
Deputy	Portrait	Party	Electoral Committee	Parliamentary Group	Number of votes
Krzysztof Sobolewski		Law and Justice	Law and Justice	Law and Justice	38 912
Ewa Leniart		Law and Justice	Law and Justice	Law and Justice	36 305
Grzegorz Braun		Confederation	Confederation	Confederation	31 148
Marcin Warchoł		Independent	Law and Justice	Law and Justice	28 495
Rafał Weber		Law and Justice	Law and Justice	Law and Justice	26 746
Paweł Poncyljusz		Independent	Civic Coalition	Civic Coalition	23 312
Zbigniew Chmielowiec		Law and Justice	Law and Justice	Law and Justice	20 634
Jan Warzecha		Law and Justice	Law and Justice	Law and Justice	18 913
Fryderyk Kapinos		Law and Justice	Law and Justice	Law and Justice	18 450
Kazimierz Gołojuch		Law and Justice	Law and Justice	Law and Justice	18 306
Kazimierz Moskal		Law and Justice	Law and Justice	Law and Justice	17 444
Stanisław Tyszka		Independent	Polish Coalition	Polish Coalition	17 086
Krystyna Skowrońska		Civic Platform	Civic Coalition	Civic Coalition	16 903
Jerzy Paul		Law and Justice	Law and Justice	Law and Justice	16 094
Wiesław Buż		Democratic Left Alliance	The Left	The Left	15 605

==== 24 – Białystok ====
Deputy	Portrait	Party	Electoral Committee	Parliamentary Group	Number of votes
Dariusz Piontkowski		Law and Justice	Law and Justice	Law and Justice	63 878
Jarosław Zieliński		Law and Justice	Law and Justice	Law and Justice	40 092
Krzysztof Truskolaski		Civic Platform	Civic Coalition	Civic Coalition	37 237
Adam Andruszkiewicz		Independent	Law and Justice	Law and Justice	29 829
Robert Winnicki		National Movement	Confederation	Confederation	22 639
Robert Tyszkiewicz		Civic Platform	Civic Coalition	Civic Coalition	17 185
Lech Kołakowski		Law and Justice	Law and Justice	Law and Justice	16 138
Kazimierz Gwiazdowski		Law and Justice	Law and Justice	Law and Justice	14 101
Eugeniusz Czykwin		Independent	Civic Coalition	Civic Coalition	14 083
Paweł Krutul		Spring	The Left	The Left	13 455
Stefan Krajewski		Polish People's Party	Polish Coalition	Polish Coalition	13 439
Aleksandra Szczudło		Independent	Law and Justice	Law and Justice	12 222
Jacek Żalek		Agreement	Law and Justice	Law and Justice	12 141
Mieczysław Baszko		Agreement	Law and Justice	Law and Justice	11 060

==== 25 – Gdańsk ====
Deputy	Portrait	Party	Electoral Committee	Parliamentary Group	Number of votes
Kacper Płażyński		Law and Justice	Law and Justice	Law and Justice	89 384
Jarosław Wałęsa		Civic Platform	Civic Coalition	Civic Coalition	61 805
Piotr Adamowicz		Independent	Civic Coalition	Civic Coalition	41 795
Agnieszka Pomaska		Civic Platform	Civic Coalition	Civic Coalition	39 103
Jarosław Sellin		Law and Justice	Law and Justice	Law and Justice	29 834
Sławomir Neumann		Civic Platform	Civic Coalition	Civic Coalition	25 202
Beata Maciejewska		Spring	The Left	The Left	23 319
Michał Urbaniak		National Movement	Confederation	Confederation	14 918
Małgorzata Chmiel		Civic Platform	Civic Coalition	Civic Coalition	13 557
Kazimierz Smoliński		Law and Justice	Law and Justice	Law and Justice	10 993
Tadeusz Cymański		United Poland	Law and Justice	Law and Justice	8 019
Jerzy Borowczak		Civic Platform	Civic Coalition	Civic Coalition	5 491

==== 26 – Słupsk ====
Deputy	Portrait	Party	Electoral Committee	Parliamentary Group	Number of votes
Barbara Nowacka		Polish Initiative	Civic Coalition	Civic Coalition	88 833
Marcin Horała		Law and Justice	Law and Justice	Law and Justice	86 079
Joanna Senyszyn		Democratic Left Alliance	The Left	The Left	36 405
Piotr Müller		Law and Justice	Law and Justice	Law and Justice	26 892
Artur Dziambor		KORWiN	Confederation	Confederation	19 334
Marek Biernacki		Independent	Polish Coalition	Polish Coalition	19 272
Aleksander Mrówczyński		Law and Justice	Law and Justice	Law and Justice	16 726
Henryka Krzywonos		Independent	Civic Coalition	Civic Coalition	14 508
Zbigniew Konwiński		Civic Platform	Civic Coalition	Civic Coalition	13 286
Kazimierz Plocke		Civic Platform	Civic Coalition	Civic Coalition	12 627
Tadeusz Aziewicz		Civic Platform	Civic Coalition	Civic Coalition	9 385
Magdalena Sroka		Agreement	Law and Justice	Law and Justice	9 349
Janusz Śniadek		Law and Justice	Law and Justice	Law and Justice	9 342
Marek Rutka		Spring	The Left	The Left	7 929

==== 27 – Bielsko-Biała I ====
Deputy	Portrait	Party	Electoral Committee	Parliamentary Group	Number of votes
Stanisław Szwed		Law and Justice	Law and Justice	Law and Justice	65 315
Mirosława Nykiel		Civic Platform	Civic Coalition	Civic Coalition	46 849
Grzegorz Puda		Law and Justice	Law and Justice	Law and Justice	23 907
Przemysław Koperski		Democratic Left Alliance	The Left	The Left	22 055
Przemysław Drabek		Law and Justice	Law and Justice	Law and Justice	19 770
Małgorzata Pępek		Civic Platform	Civic Coalition	Civic Coalition	17 914
Kazimierz Matuszny		Law and Justice	Law and Justice	Law and Justice	12 967
Grzegorz Gaża		Law and Justice	Law and Justice	Law and Justice	11 526
Mirosław Suchoń		Modern	Civic Coalition	Civic Coalition	10 039

==== 28 – Częstochowa ====
Deputy	Portrait	Party	Electoral Committee	Parliamentary Group	Number of votes
Szymon Giżyński		Law and Justice	Law and Justice	Law and Justice	42 325
Izabela Leszczyna		Civic Platform	Civic Coalition	Civic Coalition	36 266
Lidia Burzyńska		Law and Justice	Law and Justice	Law and Justice	24 672
Zdzisław Wolski		Democratic Left Alliance	The Left	The Left	18 527
Andrzej Gawron		Law and Justice	Law and Justice	Law and Justice	13 888
Mariusz Trepka		Law and Justice	Law and Justice	Law and Justice	12 881
Andrzej Szewiński		Civic Platform	Civic Coalition	Civic Coalition	10 023

==== 29 – Katowice I ====
Deputy	Portrait	Party	Electoral Committee	Parliamentary Group	Number of votes
Bożena Borys-Szopa		Law and Justice	Law and Justice	Law and Justice	49 914
Marta Golbik		Civic Platform	Civic Coalition	Civic Coalition	35 129
Wanda Nowicka		Independent	The Left	The Left	25 767
Krystyna Szumilas		Civic Platform	Civic Coalition	Civic Coalition	24 372
Wojciech Szarama		Law and Justice	Law and Justice	Law and Justice	16 649
Tomasz Głogowski		Civic Platform	Civic Coalition	Civic Coalition	12 120
Barbara Dziuk		Law and Justice	Law and Justice	Law and Justice	11 399
Jarosław Gonciarz		Law and Justice	Law and Justice	Law and Justice	8 980
Tomasz Olichwer		Civic Platform	Civic Coalition	Civic Coalition	7 837

==== 30 – Bielsko-Biała II ====
Deputy	Portrait	Party	Electoral Committee	Parliamentary Group	Number of votes
Bolesław Piecha		Law and Justice	Law and Justice	Law and Justice	38 809
Michał Woś		Independent	Law and Justice	Law and Justice	37 763
Marek Krząkała		Civic Platform	Civic Coalition	Civic Coalition	33 962
Adam Gawęda		Law and Justice	Law and Justice	Law and Justice	26 291
Krzysztof Gadowski		Civic Platform	Civic Coalition	Civic Coalition	18 799
Maciej Kopiec		Spring	The Left	The Left	14 973
Teresa Glenc		Law and Justice	Law and Justice	Law and Justice	14 274
Gabriela Lenartowicz		Civic Platform	Civic Coalition	Civic Coalition	11 838
Grzegorz Matusiak		Law and Justice	Law and Justice	Law and Justice	11 195

==== 31 – Katowice II ====
Deputy	Portrait	Party	Electoral Committee	Parliamentary Group	Number of votes
Mateusz Morawiecki		Law and Justice	Law and Justice	Law and Justice	133 687
Borys Budka		Civic Platform	Civic Coalition	Civic Coalition	99 550
Maciej Konieczny		Left Together	The Left	The Left	22 262
Dobromir Sośnierz		KORWiN	Confederation	Confederation	22 191
Monika Rosa		Modern	Civic Coalition	Civic Coalition	13 918
Ewa Kołodziej		Civic Platform	Civic Coalition	Civic Coalition	11 549
Michał Gramatyka		Civic Platform	Civic Coalition	Civic Coalition	9 304
Michał Wójcik		United Poland	Law and Justice	Law and Justice	8 315
Jerzy Polaczek		Law and Justice	Law and Justice	Law and Justice	7 621
Wojciech Król		Civic Platform	Civic Coalition	Civic Coalition	7 604
Marek Wesoły		Law and Justice	Law and Justice	Law and Justice	6 091
Andrzej Sośnierz		Agreement	Law and Justice	Law and Justice	6 061

==== 32 – Katowice III ====
Deputy	Portrait	Party	Electoral Committee	Parliamentary Group	Number of votes
Ewa Malik		Law and Justice	Law and Justice	Law and Justice	46 773
Barbara Dolniak		Modern	Civic Coalition	Civic Coalition	39 656
Włodzimierz Czarzasty		Democratic Left Alliance	The Left	The Left	31 244
Waldemar Andzel		Law and Justice	Law and Justice	Law and Justice	21 723
Robert Warwas		Law and Justice	Law and Justice	Law and Justice	20 354
Wojciech Saługa		Civic Platform	Civic Coalition	Civic Coalition	18 738
Mateusz Bochenek		Civic Platform	Civic Coalition	Civic Coalition	15 421
Rafał Adamczyk		Democratic Left Alliance	The Left	The Left	12 148
Danuta Nowicka		Law and Justice	Law and Justice	Law and Justice	7 574

==== 33 – Kielce ====
Deputy	Portrait	Party	Electoral Committee	Parliamentary Group	Number of votes
Zbigniew Ziobro		United Poland	Law and Justice	Law and Justice	115 903
Anna Krupka		Law and Justice	Law and Justice	Law and Justice	69 946
Bartłomiej Sienkiewicz		Independent	Civic Coalition	Civic Coalition	35 009
Andrzej Szejna		Democratic Left Alliance	The Left	The Left	24 337
Krzysztof Bosak		National Movement	Confederation	Confederation	22 158
Agata Wojtyszek		Law and Justice	Law and Justice	Law and Justice	18 333
Marzena Okła-Drewnowicz		Civic Platform	Civic Coalition	Civic Coalition	15 532
Krzysztof Lipiec		Law and Justice	Law and Justice	Law and Justice	14 544
Czesław Siekierski		Polish People's Party	Polish Coalition	Polish Coalition	12 745
Michał Cieślak		Agreement	Law and Justice	Law and Justice	12 310
Adam Cyrański		Independent	Civic Coalition	Civic Coalition	9 864
Dominik Tarczyński		Law and Justice	Law and Justice	Law and Justice	8 186
Andrzej Kryj		Law and Justice	Law and Justice	Law and Justice	7 690
Bartłomiej Dorywalski		Law and Justice	Law and Justice	Law and Justice	7 386
Piotr Wawrzyk		Independent	Law and Justice	Law and Justice	6 750
Marek Kwitek		Law and Justice	Law and Justice	Law and Justice	5 453

==== 34 – Elbląg ====
Deputy	Portrait	Party	Electoral Committee	Parliamentary Group	Number of votes
Jacek Protas		Civic Platform	Civic Coalition	Civic Coalition	24 266
Leonard Krasulski		Law and Justice	Law and Justice	Law and Justice	19 747
Zbigniew Babalski		Law and Justice	Law and Justice	Law and Justice	19 293
Jerzy Wilk		Law and Justice	Law and Justice	Law and Justice	18 620
Elżbieta Gelert		Civic Platform	Civic Coalition	Civic Coalition	11 590
Monika Falej		Spring	The Left	The Left	11 093
Zbigniew Ziejewski		Polish People's Party	Polish Coalition	Polish Coalition	9 028
Robert Gontarz		Law and Justice	Law and Justice	Law and Justice	7 702

==== 35 – Olsztyn ====
Deputy	Portrait	Party	Electoral Committee	Parliamentary Group	Number of votes
Wojciech Maksymowicz		Independent	Law and Justice	Law and Justice	31 575
Janusz Cichoń		Civic Platform	Civic Coalition	Civic Coalition	26 402
Marcin Kulasek		Democratic Left Alliance	The Left	The Left	20 453
Urszula Pasławska		Polish People's Party	Polish Coalition	Polish Coalition	19 528
Paweł Papke		Civic Platform	Civic Coalition	Civic Coalition	19 415
Iwona Arent		Law and Justice	Law and Justice	Law and Justice	17 916
Michał Wypij		Agreement	Law and Justice	Law and Justice	14 170
Wojciech Kossakowski		Law and Justice	Law and Justice	Law and Justice	11 257
Anna Wasilewska		Civic Platform	Civic Coalition	Civic Coalition	10 982
Jerzy Małecki		Law and Justice	Law and Justice	Law and Justice	9 631

==== 36 – Kalisz ====
Deputy	Portrait	Party	Electoral Committee	Parliamentary Group	Number of votes
Jan Dziedziczak		Law and Justice	Law and Justice	Law and Justice	60 599
Mariusz Witczak		Civic Platform	Civic Coalition	Civic Coalition	36 120
Marlena Maląg		Law and Justice	Law and Justice	Law and Justice	25 695
Wiesław Szczepański		Democratic Left Alliance	The Left	The Left	23 799
Andrzej Grzyb		Polish People's Party	Polish Coalition	Polish Coalition	21 214
Jarosław Urbaniak		Civic Platform	Civic Coalition	Civic Coalition	17 767
Jan Mosiński		Law and Justice	Law and Justice	Law and Justice	16 479
Katarzyna Sójka		Law and Justice	Law and Justice	Law and Justice	15 860
Karolina Pawliczak		Democratic Left Alliance	The Left	The Left	14 209
Tomasz Ławniczak		Law and Justice	Law and Justice	Law and Justice	13 496
Grzegorz Rusiecki		Civic Platform	Civic Coalition	Civic Coalition	12 886
Piotr Kaleta		Law and Justice	Law and Justice	Law and Justice	12 632

==== 37 – Konin ====
Deputy	Portrait	Party	Electoral Committee	Parliamentary Group	Number of votes
Zbigniew Hoffmann		Law and Justice	Law and Justice	Law and Justice	42 859
Tomasz Nowak		Civic Platform	Civic Coalition	Civic Coalition	23 693
Zbigniew Dolata		Law and Justice	Law and Justice	Law and Justice	23 116
Tadeusz Tomaszewski		Democratic Left Alliance	The Left	The Left	17 515
Ryszard Bartosik		Law and Justice	Law and Justice	Law and Justice	17 338
Paulina Hennig-Kloska		Modern	Civic Coalition	Civic Coalition	16 813
Leszek Galemba		Law and Justice	Law and Justice	Law and Justice	16 521
Witold Czarnecki		Law and Justice	Law and Justice	Law and Justice	16 502
Jacek Tomczak		Independent	Polish Coalition	Polish Coalition	9 833

==== 38 – Piła ====
Deputy	Portrait	Party	Electoral Committee	Parliamentary Group	Number of votes
Jakub Rutnicki		Civic Platform	Civic Coalition	Civic Coalition	39 344
Krzysztof Czarnecki		Law and Justice	Law and Justice	Law and Justice	38 116
Maria Janyska		Civic Platform	Civic Coalition	Civic Coalition	30 783
Marcin Porzucek		Law and Justice	Law and Justice	Law and Justice	27 077
Romuald Ajchler		Democratic Left Alliance	The Left	The Left	14 438
Krzysztof Paszyk		Polish People's Party	Polish Coalition	Polish Coalition	13 585
Marta Kubiak		Law and Justice	Law and Justice	Law and Justice	13 191
Grzegorz Piechowiak		Agreement	Law and Justice	Law and Justice	9 232
Killion Munyama		Civic Platform	Civic Coalition	Civic Coalition	7 764

==== 39 – Poznań ====
Deputy	Portrait	Party	Electoral Committee	Parliamentary Group	Number of votes
Joanna Jaśkowiak		Independent	Civic Coalition	Civic Coalition	67 822
Adam Szłapka		Modern	Civic Coalition	Civic Coalition	51 951
Jadwiga Emilewicz		Agreement	Law and Justice	Law and Justice	43 958
Katarzyna Ueberhan		Spring	The Left	The Left	33 373
Franciszek Sterczewski		Independent	Civic Coalition	Civic Coalition	25 060
Szymon Szynkowski vel Sęk		Law and Justice	Law and Justice	Law and Justice	24 233
Bartłomiej Wróblewski		Law and Justice	Law and Justice	Law and Justice	22 181
Waldy Dzikowski		Civic Platform	Civic Coalition	Civic Coalition	19 704
Rafał Grupiński		Civic Platform	Civic Coalition	Civic Coalition	17 933
Katarzyna Kretkowska		Democratic Left Alliance	The Left	The Left	16 061

==== 40 – Koszalin ====
Deputy	Portrait	Party	Electoral Committee	Parliamentary Group	Number of votes
Czesław Hoc		Law and Justice	Law and Justice	Law and Justice	33 083
Paweł Szefernaker		Law and Justice	Law and Justice	Law and Justice	22 116
Piotr Zientarski		Civic Platform	Civic Coalition	Civic Coalition	18 771
Małgorzata Golińska		Law and Justice	Law and Justice	Law and Justice	16 497
Małgorzata Prokop-Paczkowska		Spring	The Left	The Left	15 300
Marek Hok		Civic Platform	Civic Coalition	Civic Coalition	11 572
Jerzy Hardie-Douglas		Civic Platform	Civic Coalition	Civic Coalition	10 280
Radosław Lubczyk		Independent	Polish Coalition	Polish Coalition	6 712

==== 41 – Szczecin ====
Deputy	Portrait	Party	Electoral Committee	Parliamentary Group	Number of votes
Sławomir Nitras		Civic Platform	Civic Coalition	Civic Coalition	78 513
Marek Gróbarczyk		Law and Justice	Law and Justice	Law and Justice	58 912
Arkadiusz Marchewka		Civic Platform	Civic Coalition	Civic Coalition	30 047
Dariusz Wieczorek		Democratic Left Alliance	The Left	The Left	24 924
Magdalena Filiks		Independent	Civic Coalition	Civic Coalition	14 224
Leszek Dobrzyński		Law and Justice	Law and Justice	Law and Justice	14 105
Jarosław Rzepa		Polish People's Party	Polish Coalition	Polish Coalition	12 622
Michał Jach		Law and Justice	Law and Justice	Law and Justice	11 881
Grzegorz Napieralski		Independent	Civic Coalition	Civic Coalition	11 766
Artur Szałabawka		Law and Justice	Law and Justice	Law and Justice	11 346
Katarzyna Kotula		Independent	The Left	The Left	7 557
Artur Łącki		Civic Platform	Civic Coalition	Civic Coalition	5 668

=== Timeline ===
Event	Date	Gov't Majority	PiS	KO	L	KP	KWiN	Non-inscrit^{†}	Vacant
2019 Election	13 November 2019	5	235	134	49	30	11	1	0
Inauguration of the 9th term Sejm	12 November 2019	5	235	134	49	30	11	1	0

^{†}Ryszard Galla (German Minority Electoral Committee)

== 10th term Senate ==
=== Timeline ===
Event	Date	Gov't Majority	PiS	KO	KP	L	Ind. Senators Circle	Non-inscrit^{†}	Vacant
2019 Election	13 October 2019	-2	48	43	3	2	—	4	0
Inauguration of the 10th term Senate	12 November 2019	-2	48	43	3	0	3	3	0
Retroactive recognition of the Left	12 November 2019	-2	48	43	3	2	3	1	0

== Government ==
Portrait	Name Sejm District (Birth–Death)	Tenure			Ministerial offices held as prime minister	Party	Government
Portrait	Name Sejm District (Birth–Death)	Took office	Left office	Duration	Ministerial offices held as prime minister	Party	Government
6	Mateusz Morawiecki; Katowice II - 31 (born 1968)	15 November 2019	27 November 2023	4 years, 13 days	Digital Affairs (2020–2023)	Law and Justice	Morawiecki II
