= Borowiak =

Borowiak is a surname. Notable people with the surname include:

- Dariusz Borowiak (1962–2022), Polish geographer
- Jeff Borowiak (born 1949), American tennis player
- Joanna Borowiak (born 1967), Polish politician
- Simon Borowiak (born 1964), German writer
