= Anna Milczanowska =

Polish politician

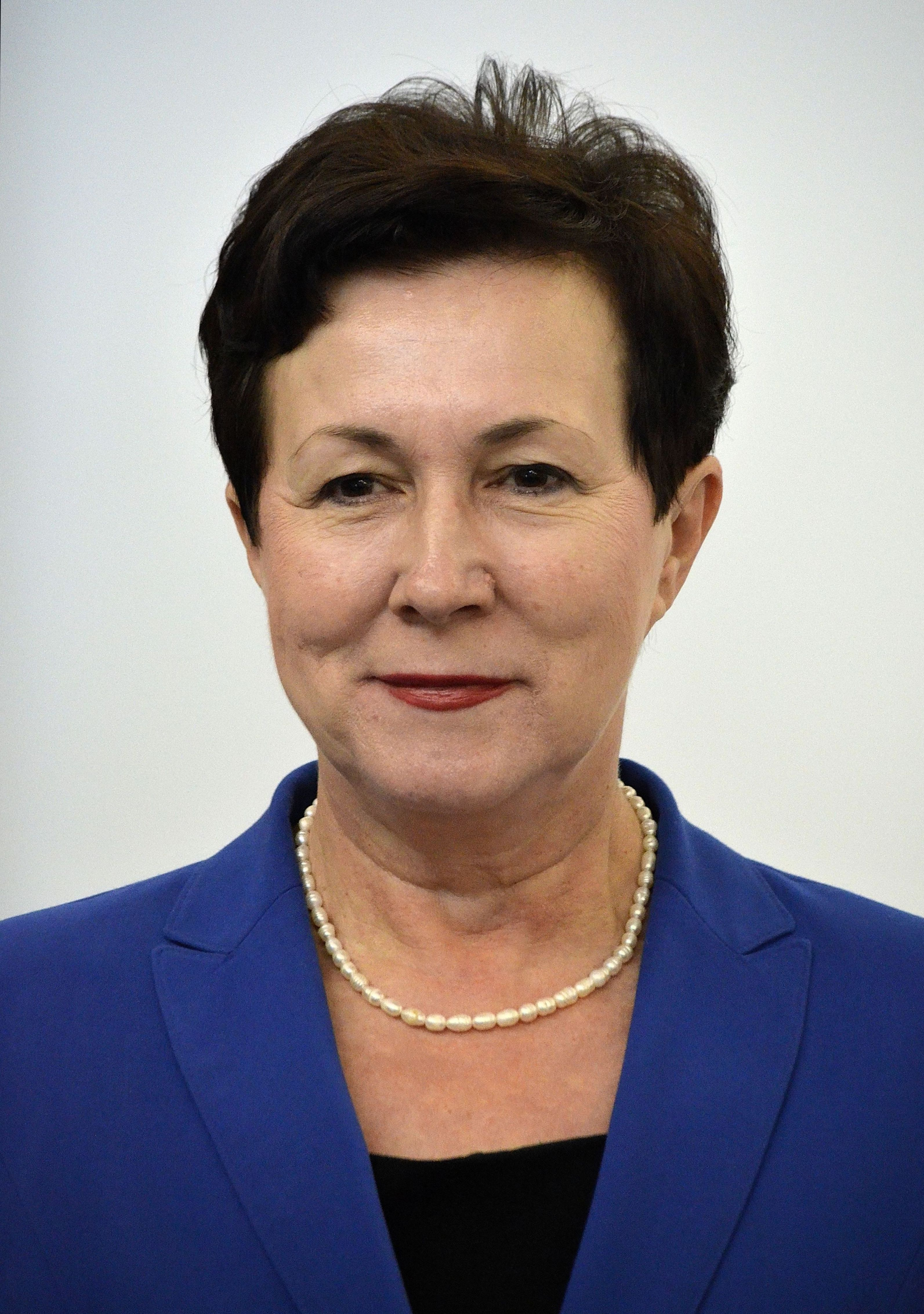

Member of the Sejm

Personal details
- Born: 18 July 1958 (age 67)

Anna Maria Milczanowska (born 18 July 1958) is a Polish politician. She was elected to the Sejm (9th term) representing the constituency of Piotrków Trybunalski. She previously also served in the 8th term of the Sejm (2015–2019).
