= Danuta Nowicka =

Polish politician (born 1951)

Member of the Sejm

Personal details
- Born: 20 July 1951 (age 74)

Danuta Nowicka (born 20 July 1951) is a Polish politician. She was elected to the Sejm (9th term) representing the constituency of Katowice III. She previously also served in the 8th term of the Sejm (2015–2019).
