= Ewa Szymańska =

Polish politician (born 1952)

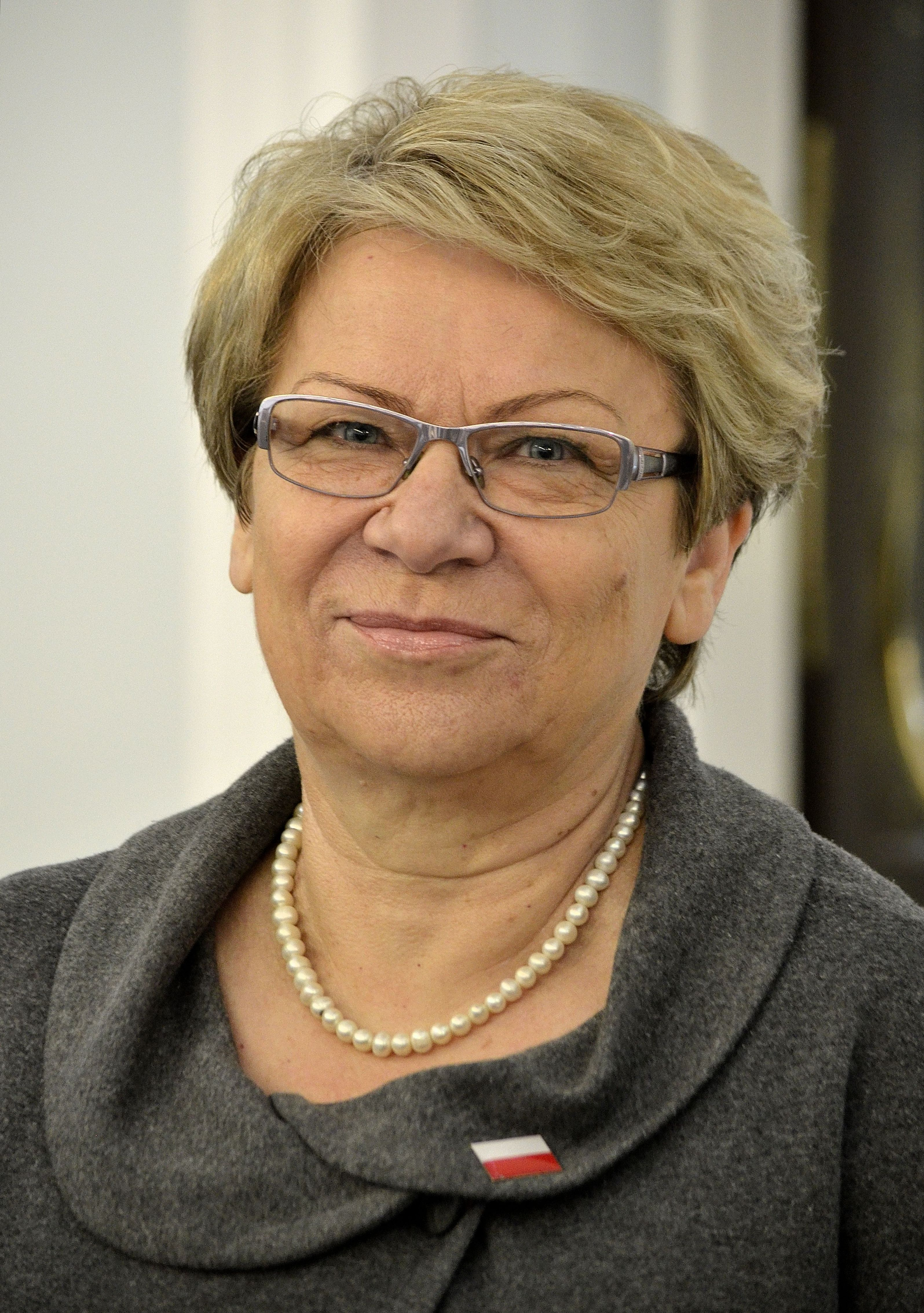

Member of the Sejm

Personal details
- Born: 24 April 1952 (age 73)

Ewa Zofia Szymańska (born 24 April 1952) is a Polish politician. She was elected to the Sejm (9th term) representing the constituency of Legnica. She previously also served in the 8th term of the Sejm (2015–2019).
