= Maria Kurowska =

Polish politician (born 1954)

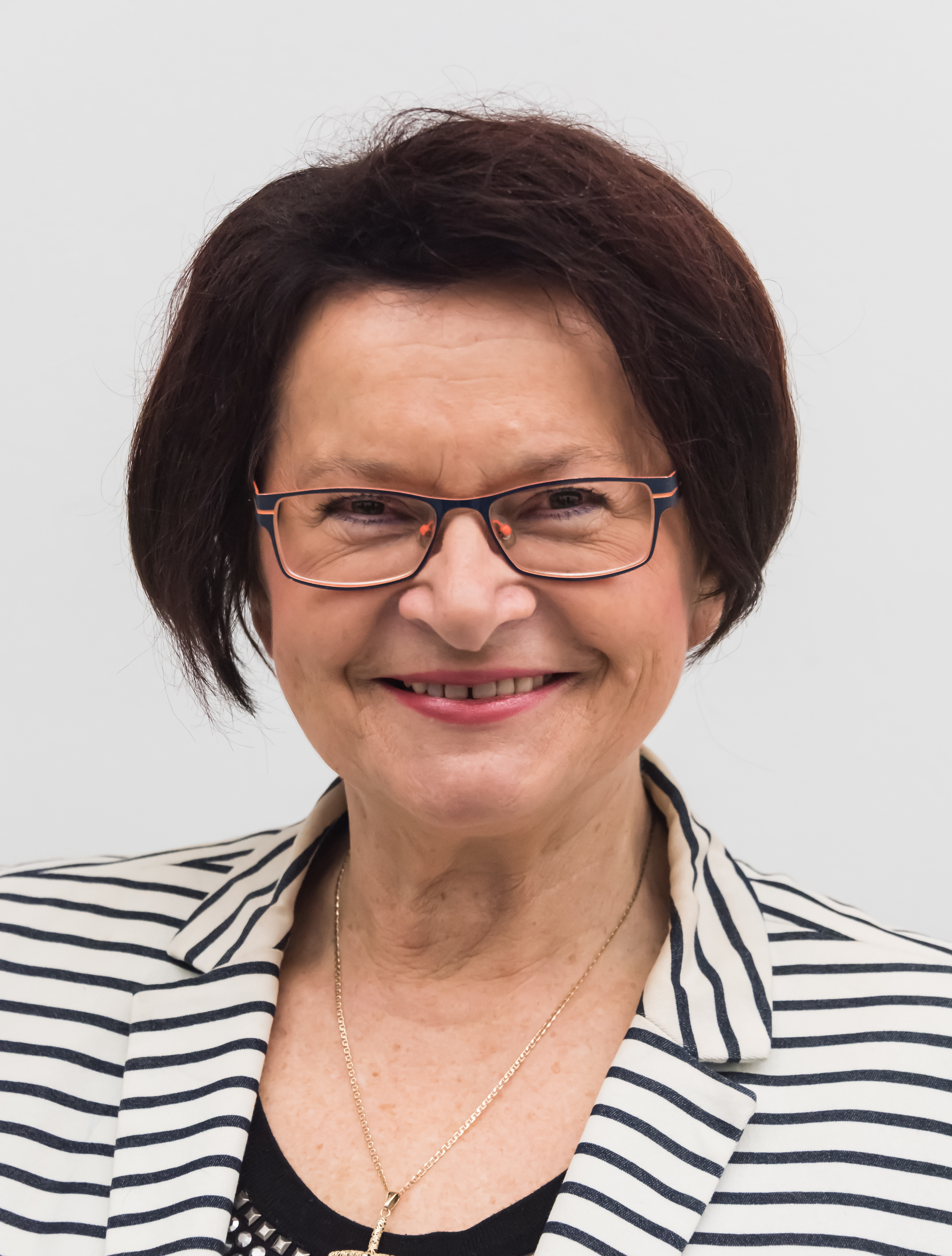

Member of the Sejm
- Incumbent
- Assumed office 12 November 2019
- Prime Minister: Mateusz Morawiecki, Donald Tusk

Personal details
- Born: 3 June 1954 (age 71)

Maria Stanisława Kurowska (born 3 June 1954) is a Polish politician. She was elected to the Sejm (9th term) representing the constituency of Krosno.
