= Joanna Jaśkowiak =

Polish politician (born 1965)

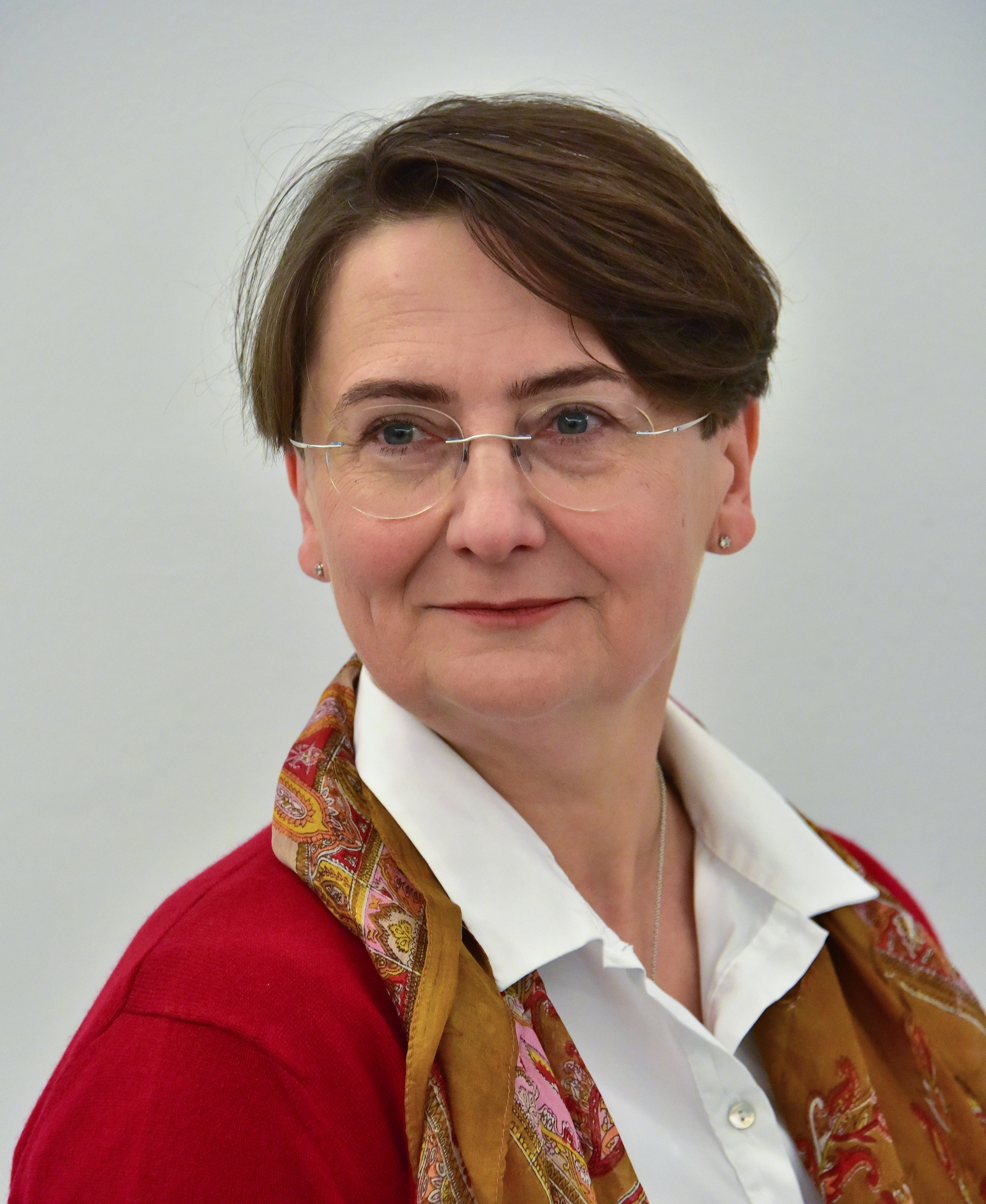

Member of the Sejm
- In office 12 November 2019 – 12 November 2023

Personal details
- Born: 6 November 1965 (age 60)

Joanna Jaśkowiak (born 6 November 1965) is a Polish politician. She was elected to the Sejm (9th term) representing the constituency of Poznań.

== Career ==
Jaśkowiak studied law at the Adam Mickiewicz University in Poznań. After she graduated, she completed a law apprenticeship and later a notarial apprenticeship. She opened her own notary office in Kórnik in 1996. For two terms she was a member of the Council of the Notary Chamber in Poznań and the district examination committee for notary training.

== Activism ==
Jaśkowiak is a member of Program Council of the Congress of Women and supported the All-Poland Women's Strike.
