= Beata Maciejewska =

Polish politician (born 1968)

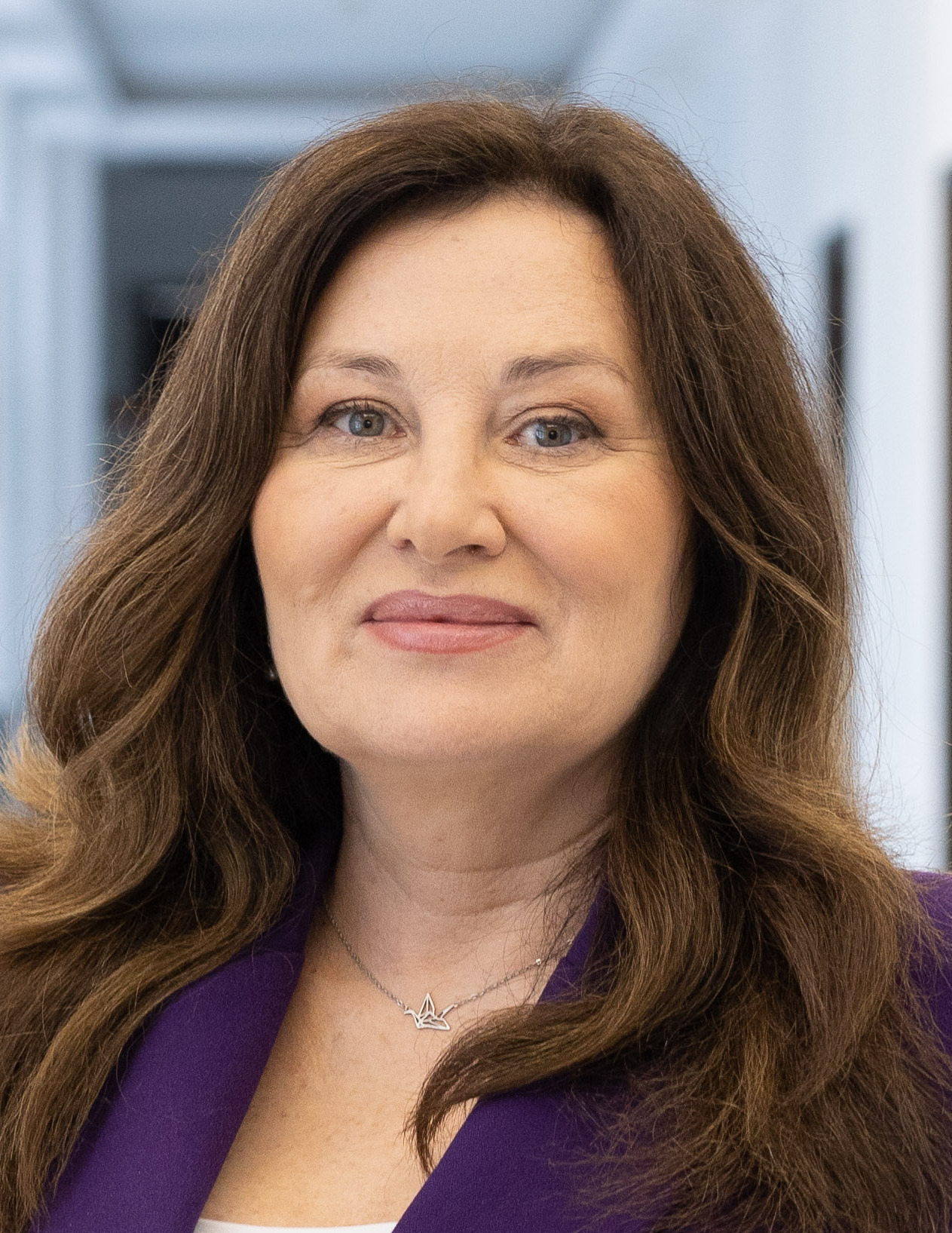

Member of the Sejm
- In office 12 November 2019 – 12 November 2023

Personal details
- Born: 13 August 1968 (age 57)

Beata Monika Maciejewska (born 13 August 1968) is a Polish politician. She was elected to the Sejm (9th term) representing the constituency of Gdańsk.
