= Małgorzata Chmiel =

Polish politician (born 1953)

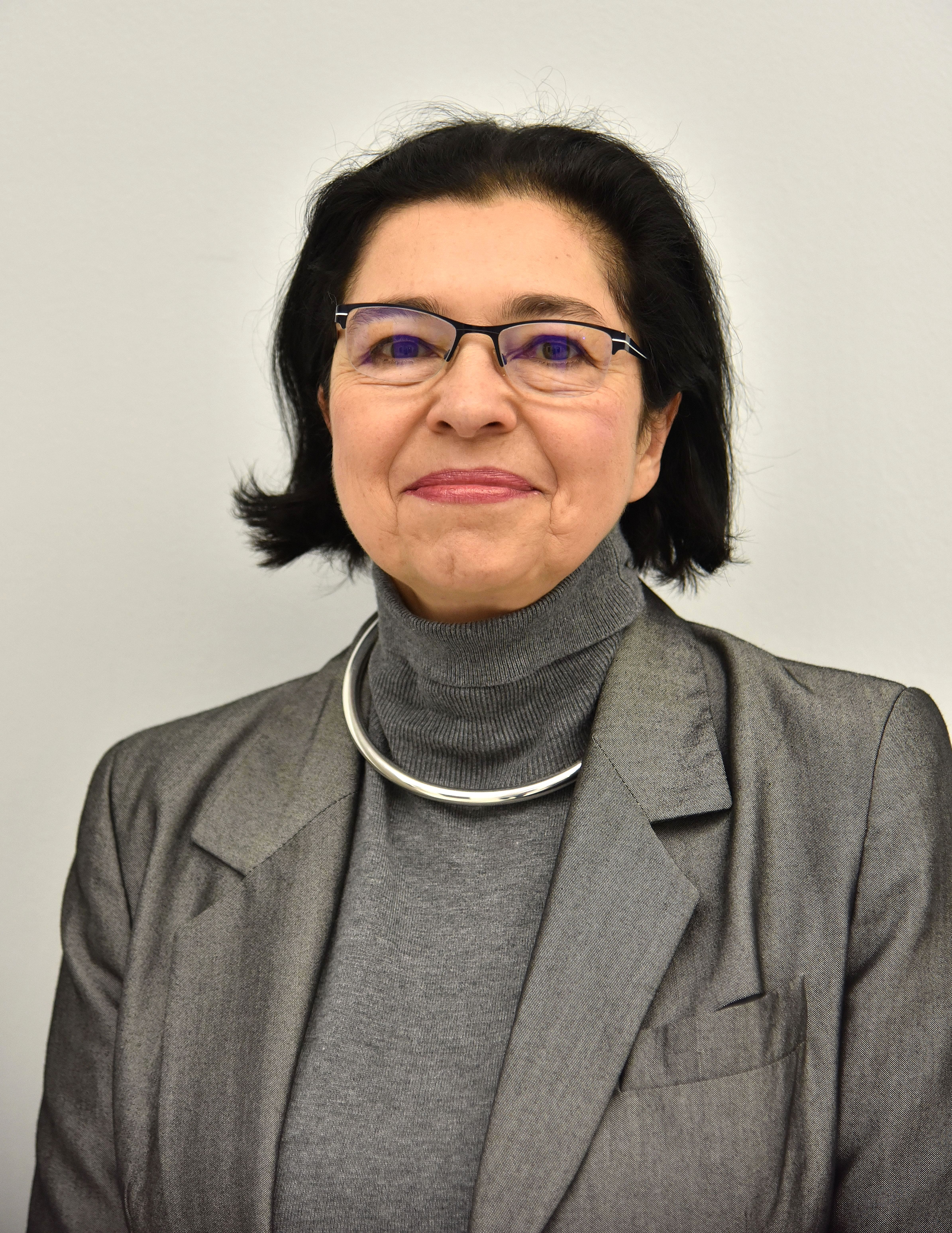

Member of the Sejm

Personal details
- Born: 1 May 1953 (age 72)

Małgorzata Chmiel (born 1 May 1953) is a Polish politician. She was elected to the Sejm (9th term) representing the constituency of Gdańsk. She previously also served in the 8th term of the Sejm (2015–2019).
