= Ewa Kozanecka =

Polish politician (born 1974)

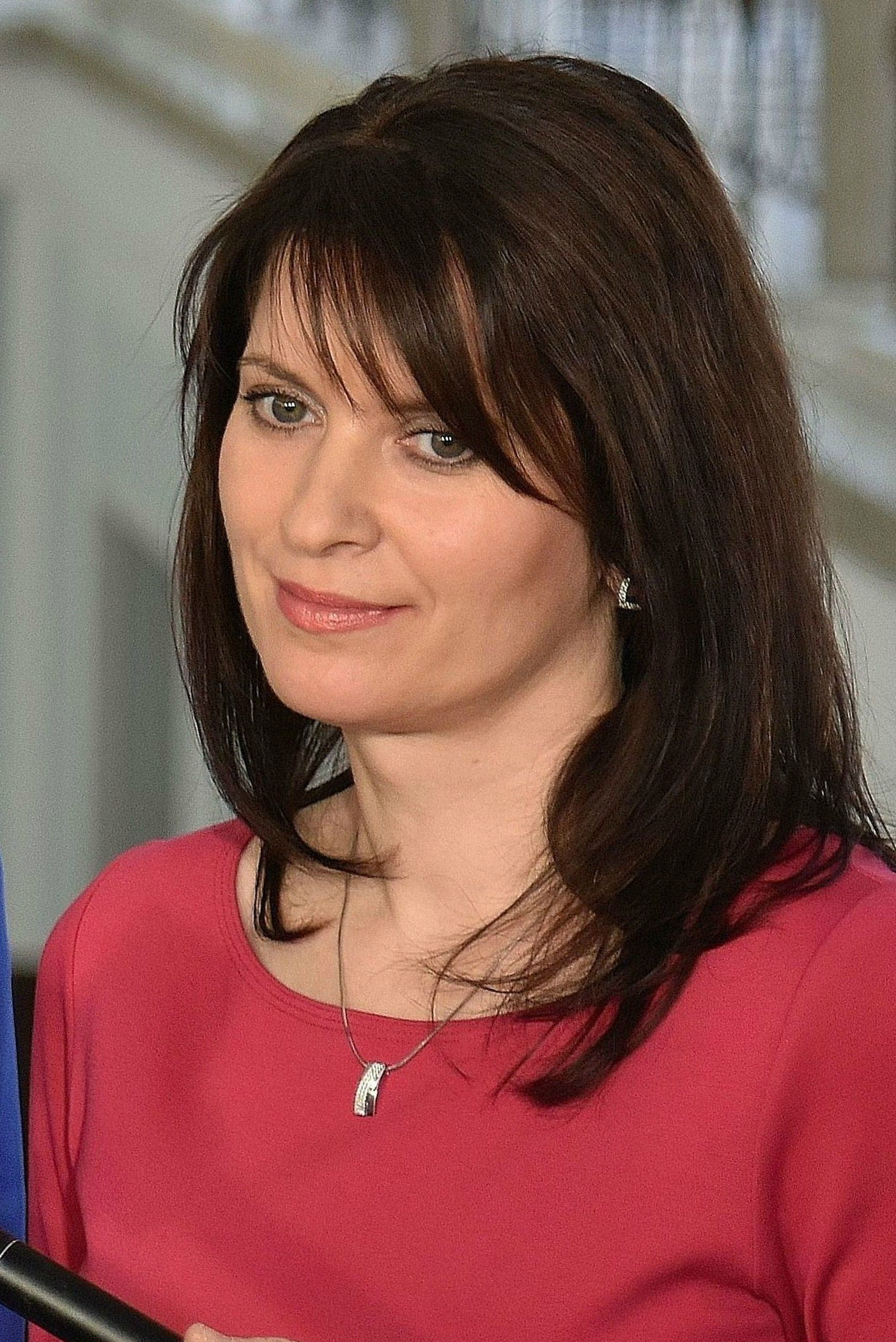

Member of the Sejm
- In office 12 November 2015 – 12 November 2023
- Constituency: 4 - Bydgoszcz

Personal details
- Born: 29 May 1974 (age 51)

Ewa Kozanecka (born 29 May 1974) is a Polish politician. Previously a member of NSZZ Solidarity, Kozanecka served as a trade union leader of the Municipal Water and Sewage Workers' Council in Bydgoszcz. Joining Law and Justice, she was first elected to the Sejm in the 2015 Polish parliamentary election representing the constituency of Bydgoszcz. Re-elected in 2019, she however lost her seat in the 2023 election.
