= Małgorzata Golińska =

Polish politician (born 1980)

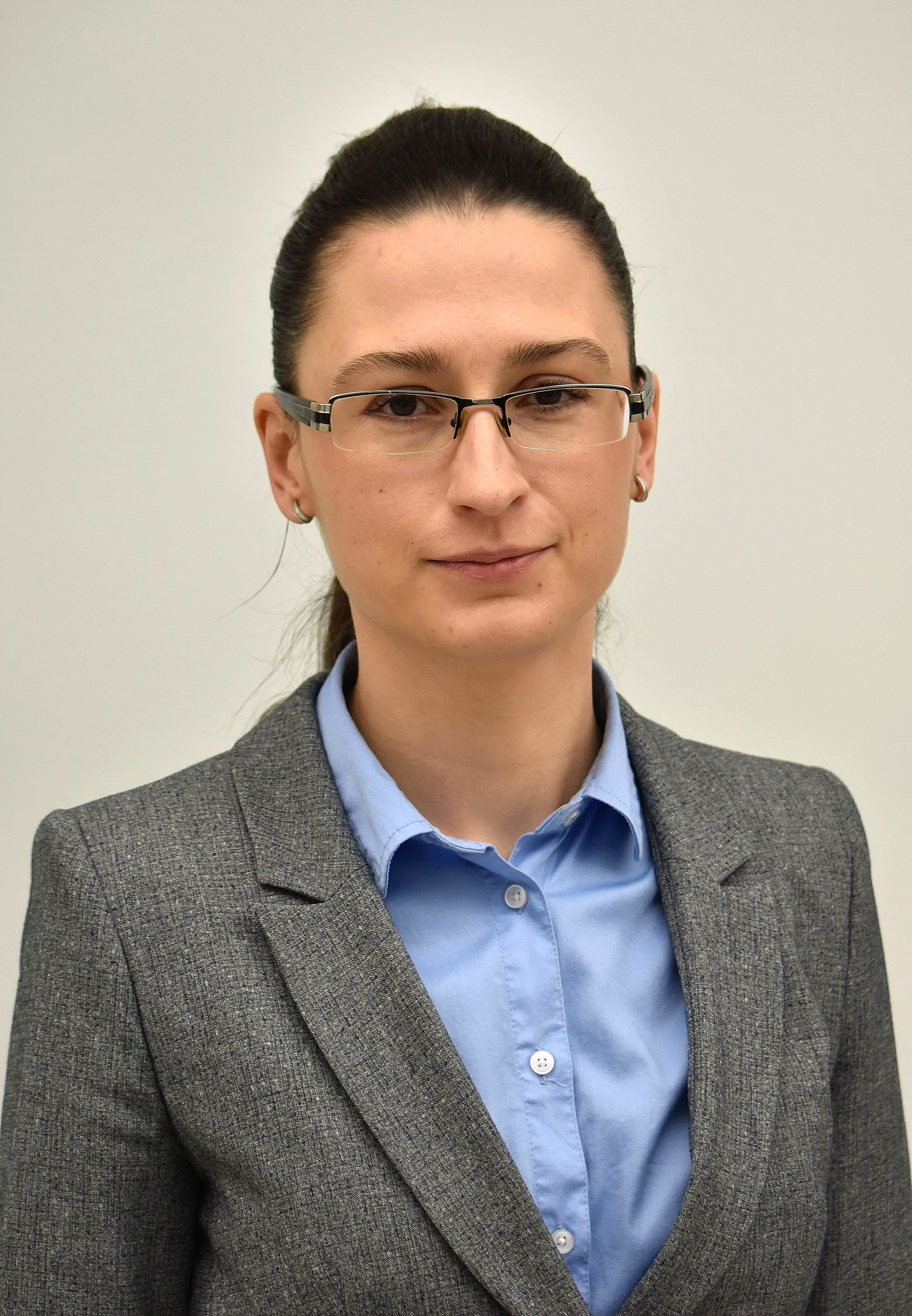

Member of the Sejm

Personal details
- Born: 30 October 1980 (age 45)

Małgorzata Golińska (born 30 October 1980) is a Polish politician. She was elected to the Sejm (9th term) representing the constituency of Koszalin. She previously also served in the 8th term of the Sejm (2015–2019).
