= Anna Schmidt-Rodziewicz =

Polish politician (born 1978)

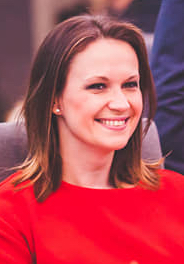

Member of the Sejm
- Incumbent
- Assumed office 12 November 2015

Personal details
- Born: 11 November 1978 (age 47)
- Party: Law and Justice

Anna Katarzyna Schmidt-Rodziewicz (born 11 November 1978) is a Polish politician. She was elected to the Sejm (9th term) representing the constituency of Krosno. She previously also served in the 8th term of the Sejm (2015–2019).
