= Teresa Pamuła =

Polish politician (born 1956)

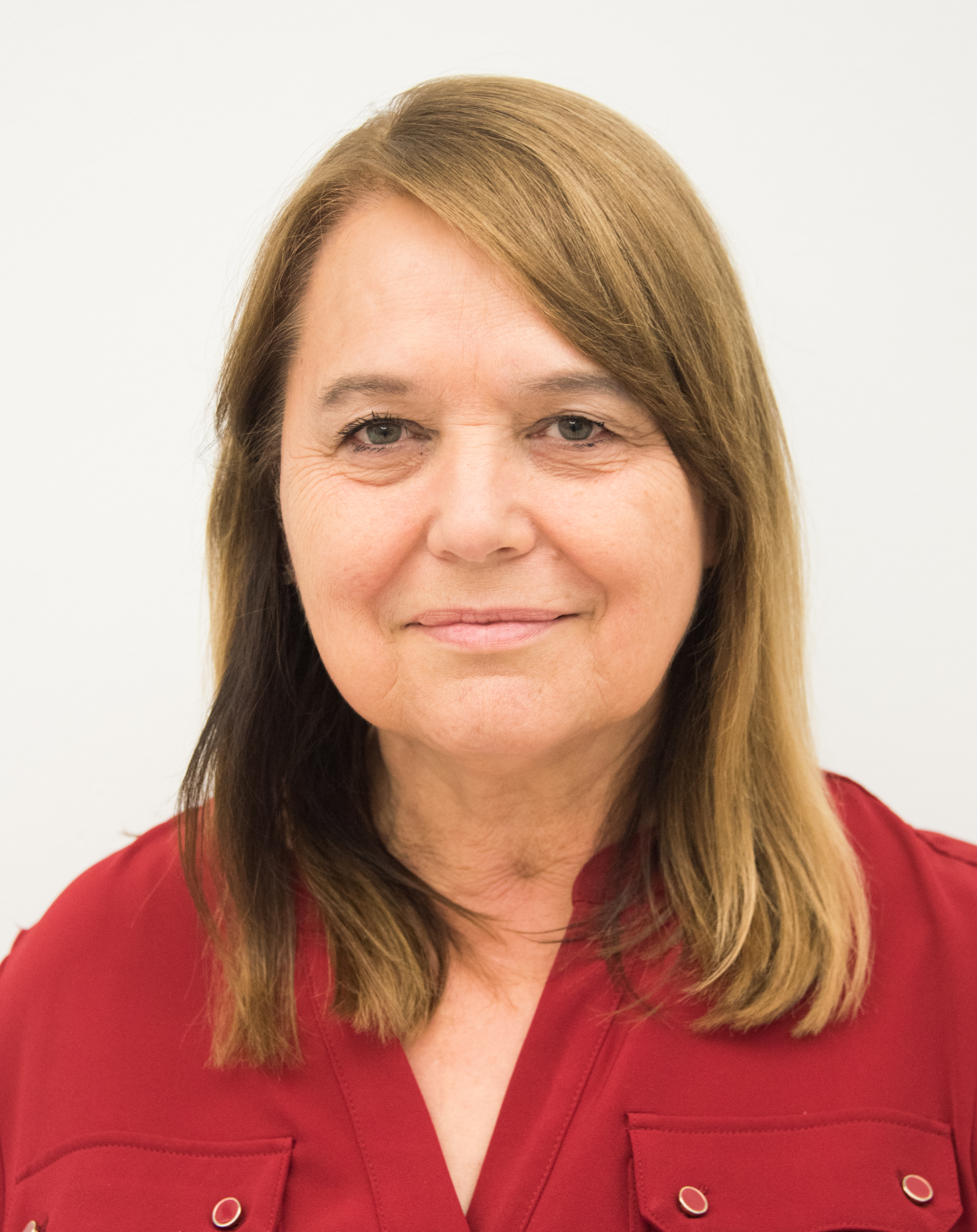

Member of the Sejm

Personal details
- Born: 28 December 1956 (age 69)

Teresa Pamuła (born 28 December 1956) is a Polish politician. She was elected to the Sejm (9th term) representing the constituency of Krosno.
