= Robert Obaz =

Polish politician (born 1973)

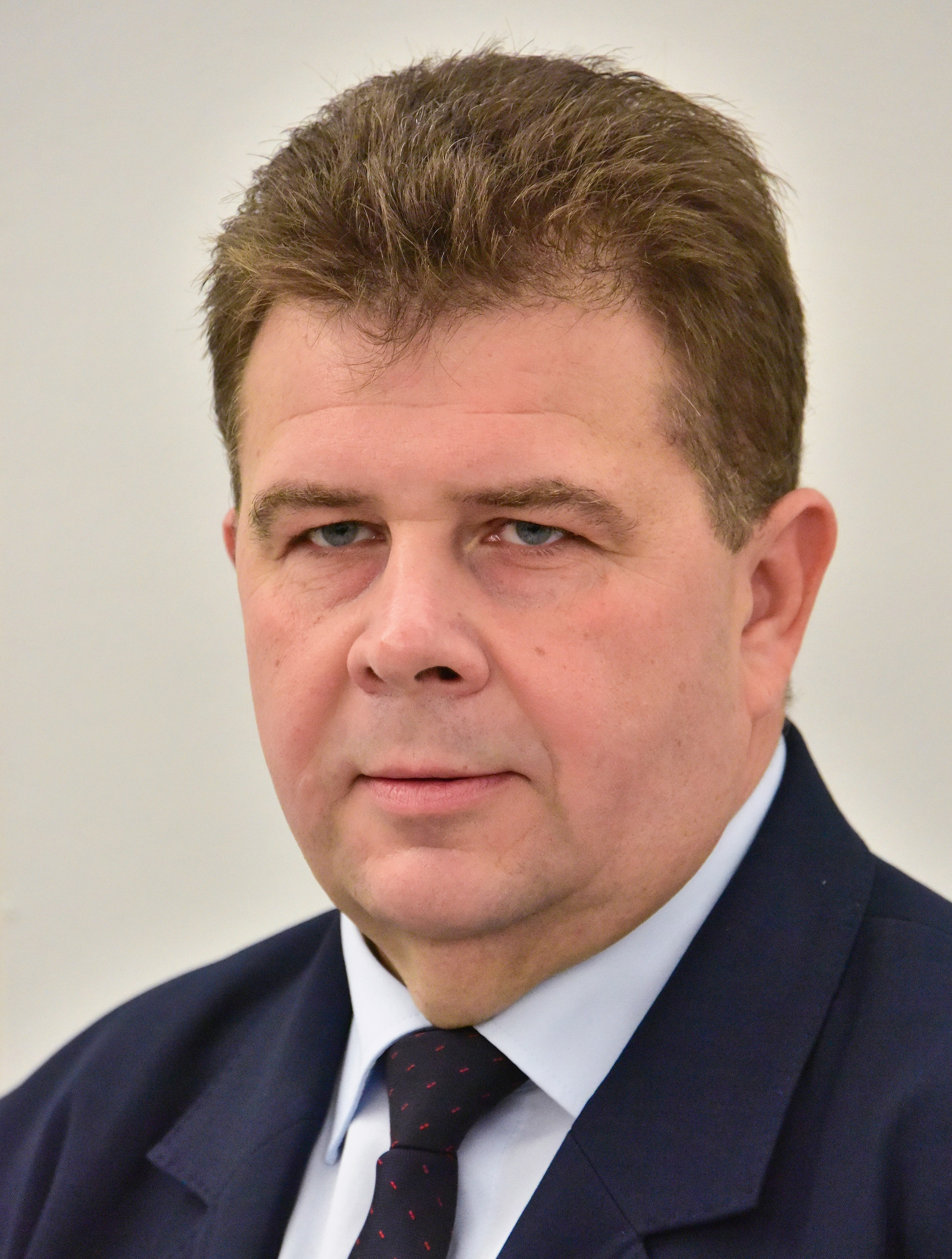

Member of the Sejm
- In office 12 November 2019 – 12 November 2023

Personal details
- Born: 8 March 1973 (age 53) Jelenia Góra, Poland

Robert Marcin Obaz (born 8 March 1973) is a Polish politician. He was elected to the Sejm (9th term) representing the constituency of Legnica.

He was born in Jelenia Góra, Poland.
