= Marta Golbik =

Polish politician (born 1985)

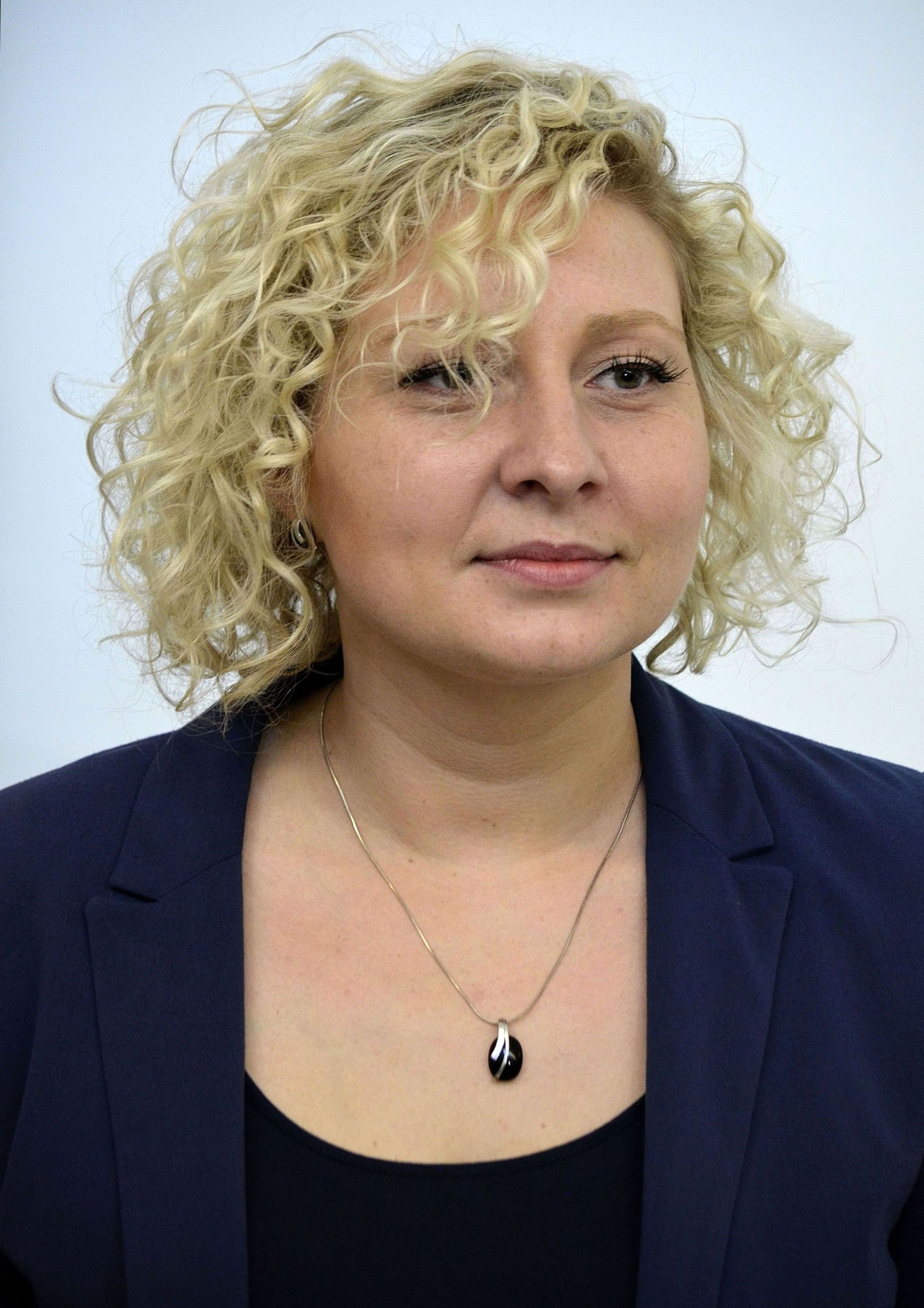

Member of the Sejm

Personal details
- Born: 14 April 1985 (age 41)

Marta Joanna Golbik (born 14 April 1985) is a Polish politician. She was elected to the Sejm (9th term) representing the constituency of Katowice I. She previously also served in the 8th term of the Sejm (2015–2019).
