= Aleksandra Szczudło =

Polish politician

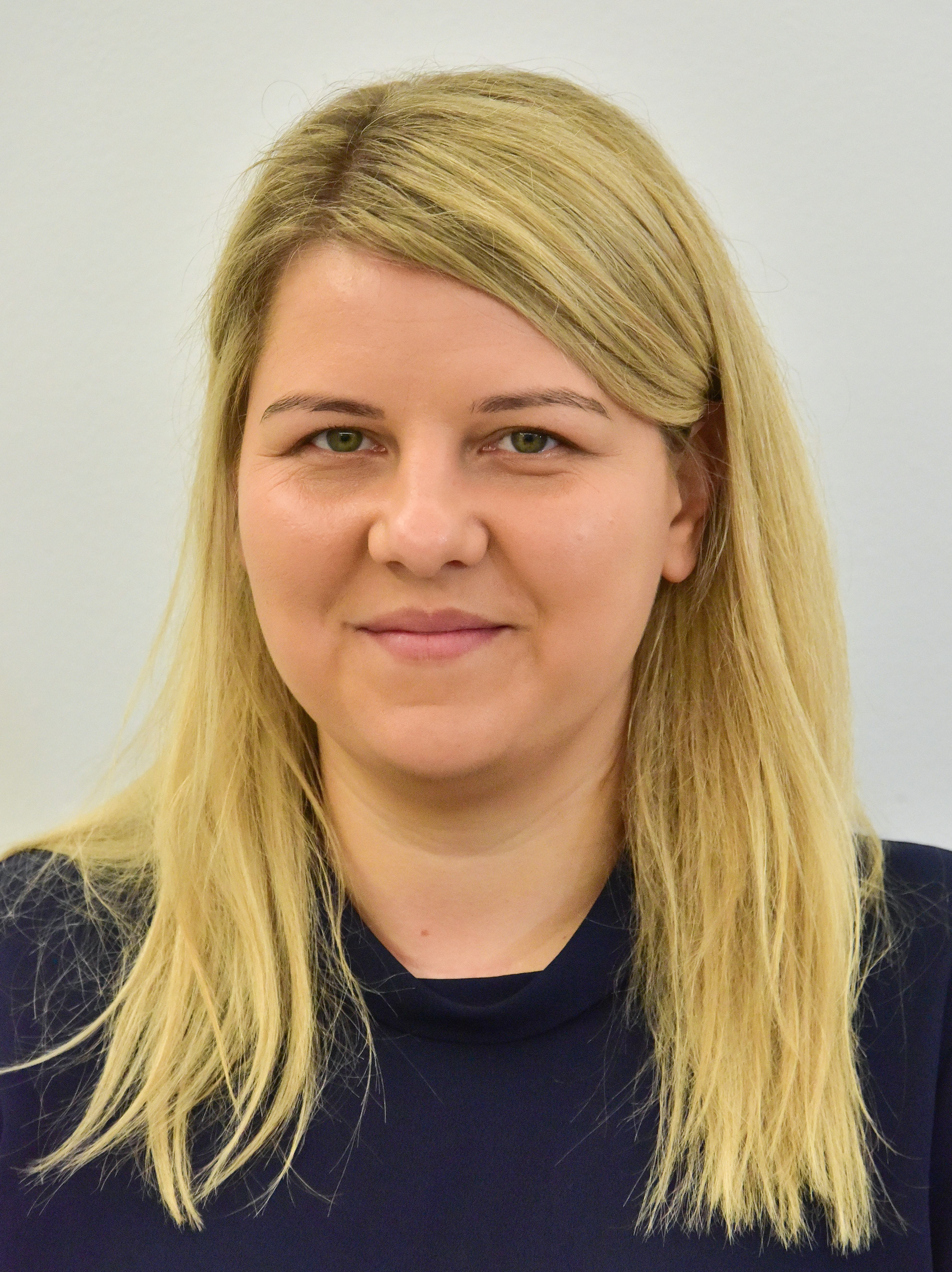

Member of the Sejm
- In office 12 November 2019 – 12 November 2023
- Constituency: 24 – Białystok

Personal details
- Born: 22 September 1983 (age 42)

Aleksandra Szczudło (born 22 September 1983 in Ciechanowiec) is a Polish politician. She was elected to the Sejm (9th term) representing the constituency of Białystok and didn't run for re-election in 2023.
