= Barbara Dziuk =

Polish politician (born 1968)

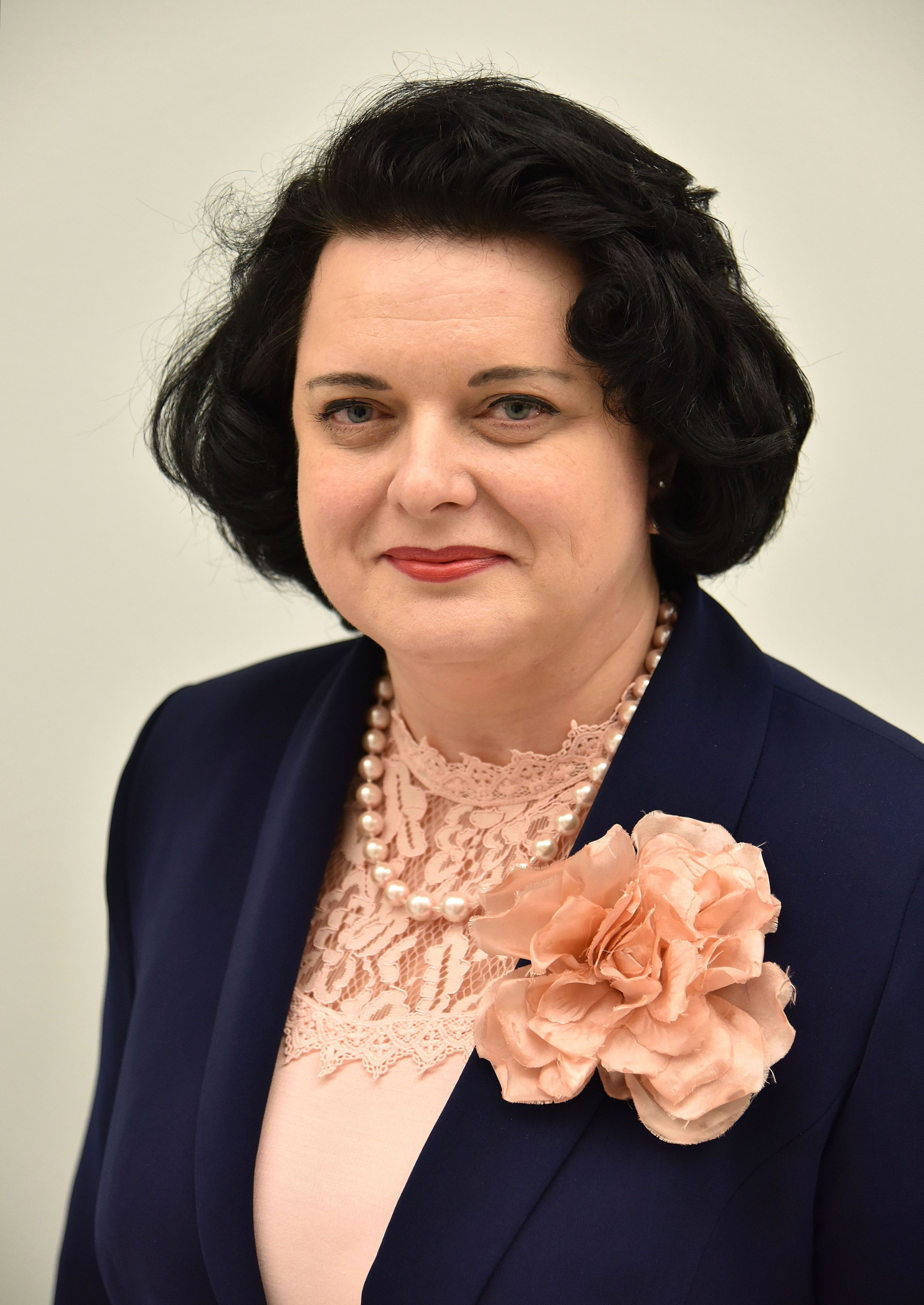

Member of the Sejm

Personal details
- Born: 2 December 1968 (age 57)

Barbara Anna Dziuk (born 2 December 1968) is a Polish politician. She was elected to the Sejm in its 9th term (2019–2023) representing the constituency of Katowice I. She previously also served in the 8th term of the Sejm (2015–2019).
