= Teresa Hałas =

Polish politician

Member of the Sejm

Personal details
- Born: 13 April 1953 (age 73)

Teresa Hałas (born 13 April 1953) is a Polish politician. She was elected to the Sejm (9th term) representing the constituency of Chełm. She previously also served in the 8th term of the Sejm (2015–2019).
