= Jerzy Wilk =

Polish politician (1955–2021)

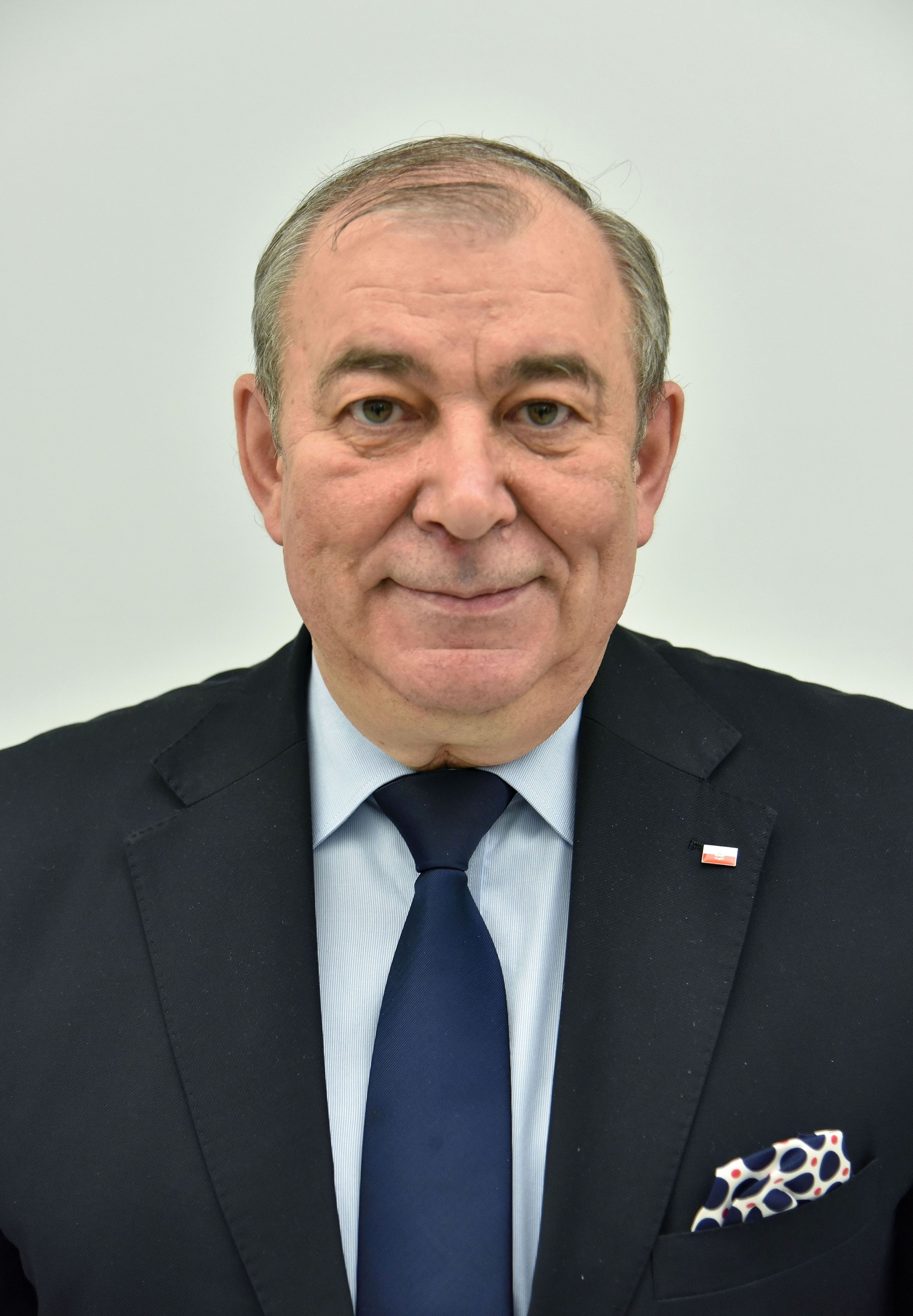
- Wilk in 2016

Member of the Sejm of the Republic of Poland
- In office 2015 – 16 May 2021

Personal details
- Born: 15 March 1955 Elbląg, Poland
- Died: 16 May 2021 (aged 66) Elbląg, Poland
- Party: Law and Justice
- Spouse: Teresa Wilk

Jerzy Wilk (15 March 1955 – 16 May 2021) was a Polish politician who served as a member of the Sejm. The bridge across the Vistula Spit canal is named in his honor.

== Death ==
Wilk died on 16 May 2021, aged 66, in Elbląg, Poland. The cause of death was not disclosed.
