= Jerzy Bielecki (politician) =

Polish politician (born 1969)

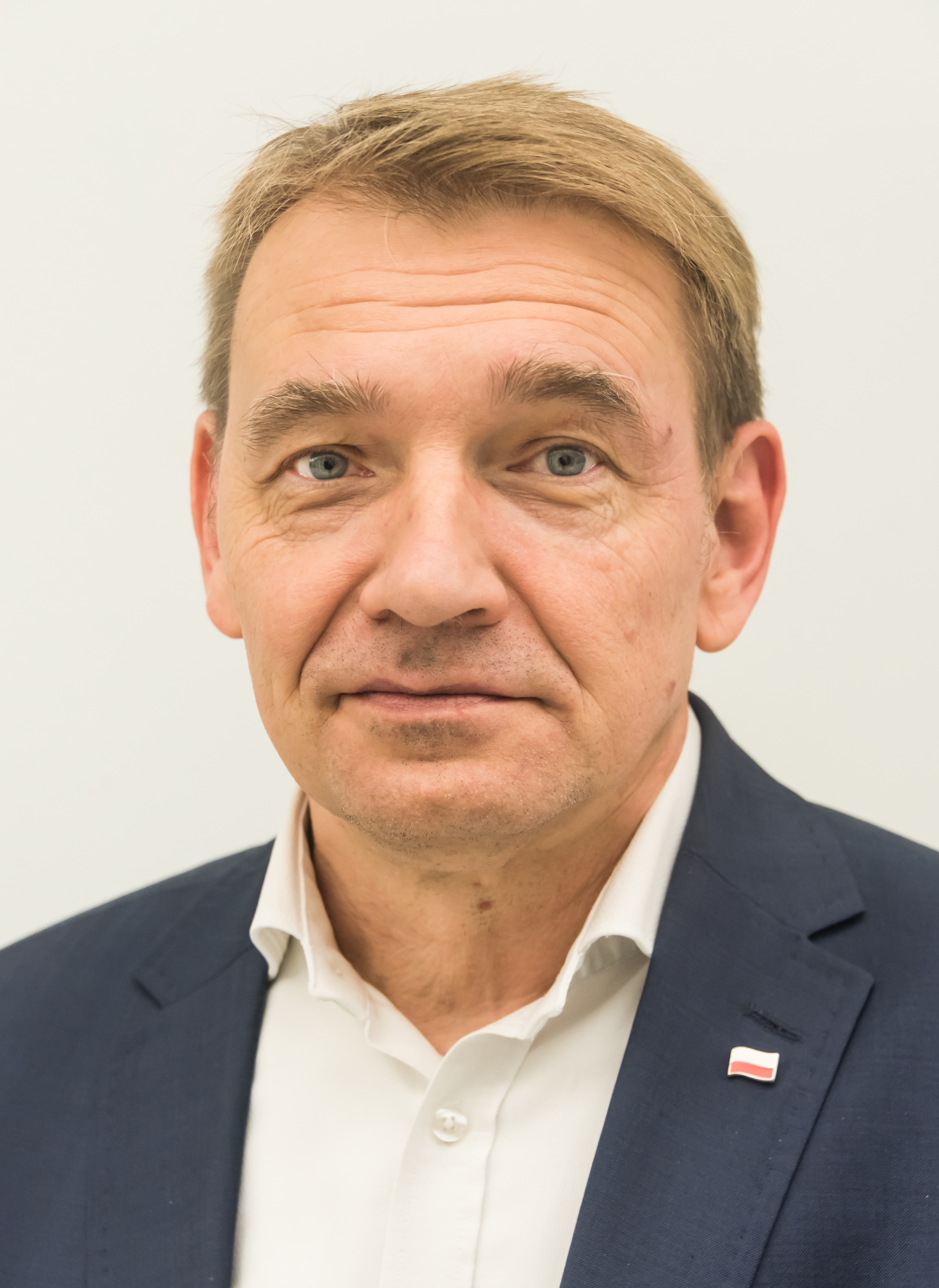
- Bielecki in 2015

member of Sejm 2005-2007
- In office 25 September 2005 – ?

Personal details
- Born: 19 November 1969 (age 56)
- Party: Law and Justice

Jerzy Feliks Bielecki (born 19 November 1969 in Janów Lubelski) is a Polish politician. He was elected to the Sejm on 25 September 2005, getting 4,748 votes in 6 Lublin district as a candidate from the Law and Justice list.

== See also ==
- Members of Polish Sejm 2005-2007
