= Rafał Adamczyk =

Polish politician

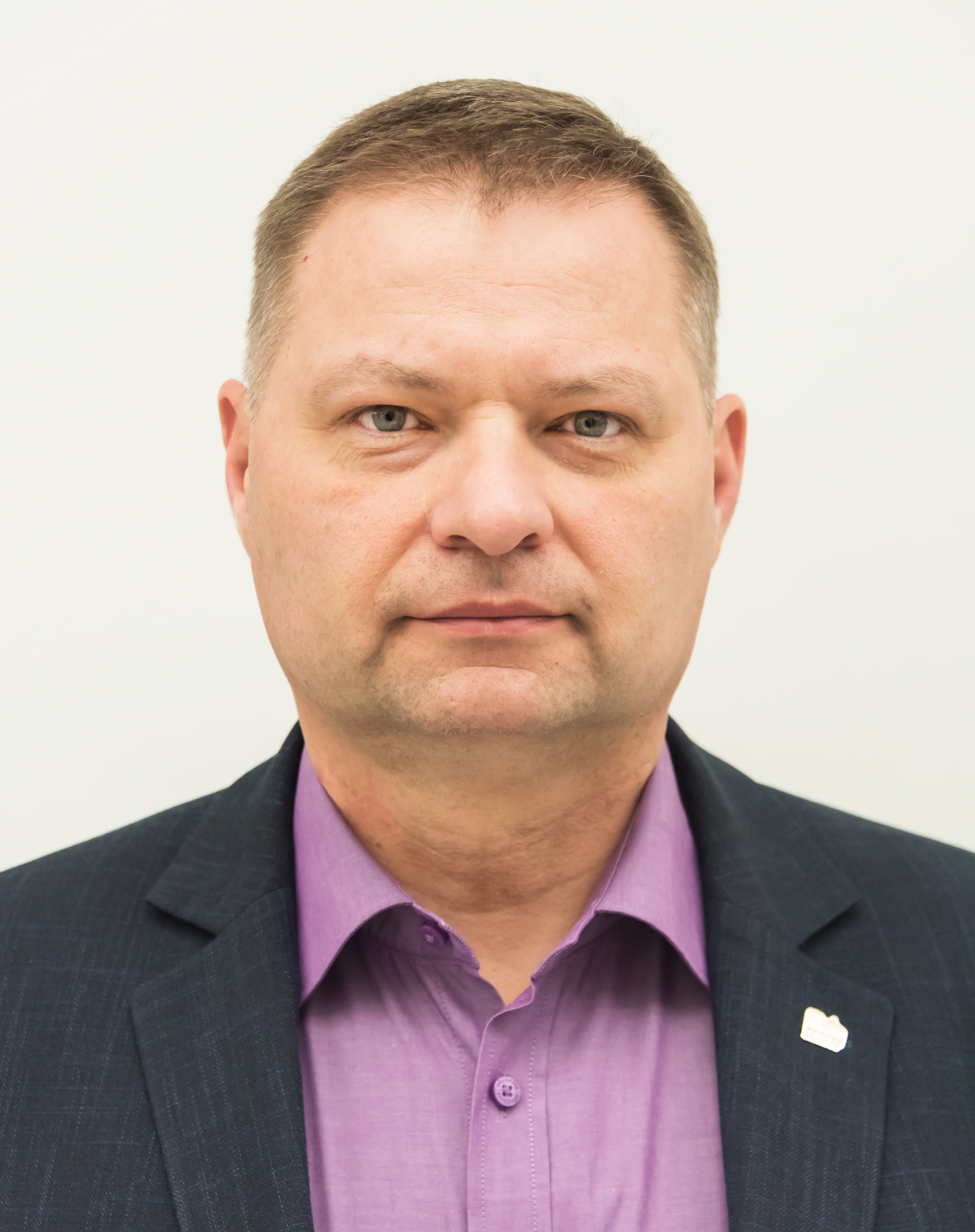
- In office 12 November 2019 – 12 November 2023

Member of the Sejm

Personal details
- Born: 30 May 1974 (age 51) Dąbrowa Górnicza, Poland
- Party: New Left

Rafał Adamczyk (born 30 May 1974) is a Polish politician. Member of the Sejm for New Left. Former Vice President of Będzin.

== Electoral history ==
Sejm
Election	Party	Votes	%	Constituency	Elected?
2019	Democratic Left Alliance	12,148	3.62	Katowice	Yes
2023	New Left	5,900	1.56	Katowice	No
