= Kazimierz Matuszny =

Polish politician (born 1960)

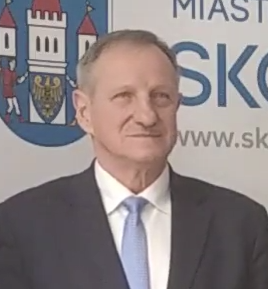

member of Sejm 2005-2007
- In office 25 September 2005 – ?

Personal details
- Born: 1960 (age 65–66)
- Party: Law and Justice

Kazimierz Władysław Matuszny (born 4 March 1960 in Milówka) is a Polish politician. He was elected to the Sejm on 25 September 2005, getting 9,033 votes in 27 Bielsko-Biała district as a candidate from the Law and Justice list.

== See also ==
- Members of Polish Sejm 2005-2007
