= Tadeusz Aziewicz =

Polish politician (born 1960)

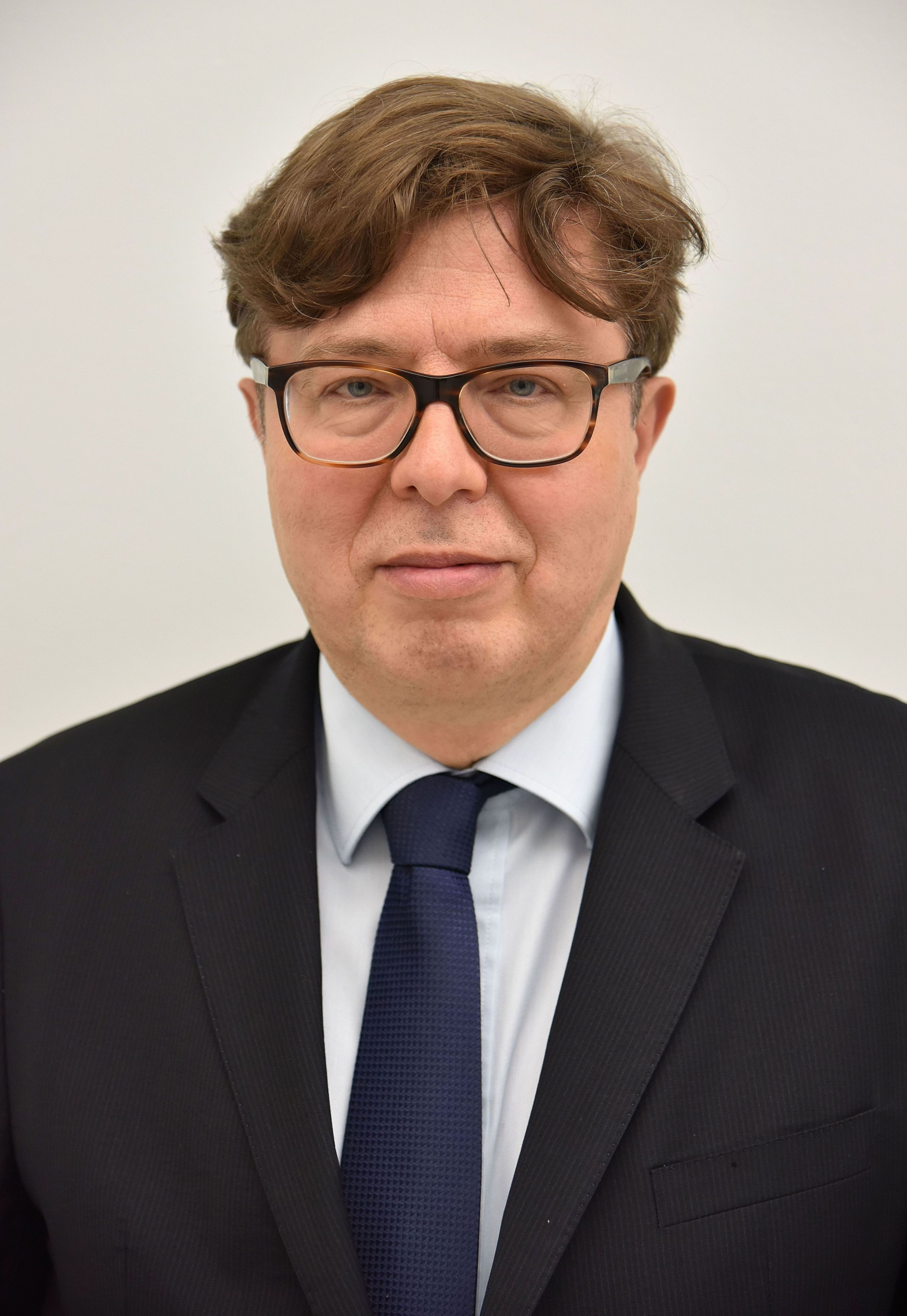
- Tadeusz Aziewicz in 2016

Deputy of the Sejm
- In office 18 October 2005 – 12 November 2023
- Constituency: 26 Słupsk (after 2019); 26 Gdynia (until 2019)

Personal details
- Born: October 31, 1960 (age 65) Sopot, Polish People's Republic
- Party: Civic Platform

Tadeusz Aziewicz (born 31 October 1960) is a Polish politician. He was elected to the Sejm on 25 September 2005, getting 9093 votes in 26 Gdynia district as a candidate from the Civic Platform list. He continued to serve in the Sejm until 2023.

== See also ==
- Members of Polish Sejm 2005-2007
