= Joanna Borowiak =

Polish politician (born 1967)

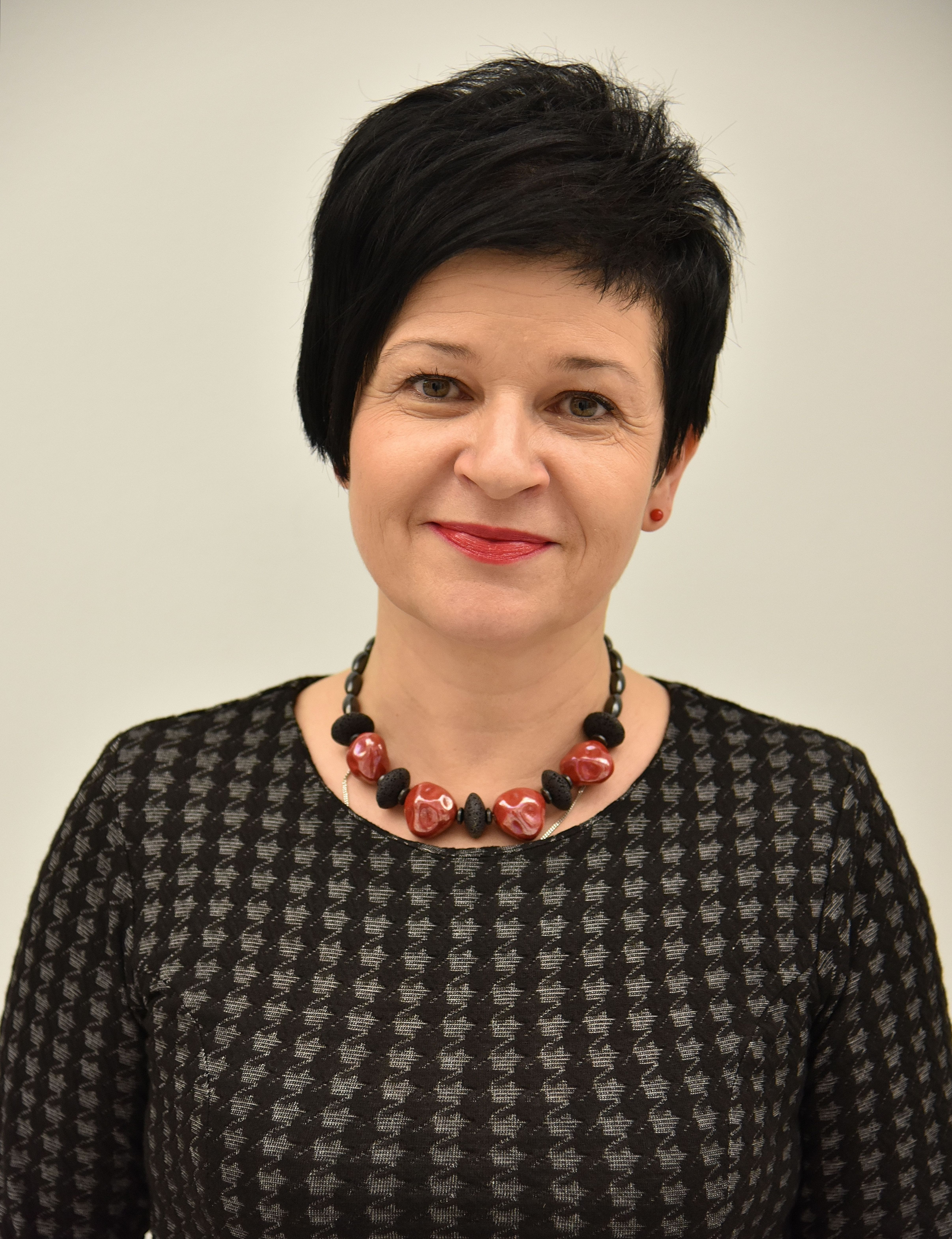

Member of the Sejm
- Incumbent
- Assumed office 12 November 2015

Personal details
- Born: 20 August 1967 (age 58)

Joanna Beata Borowiak (born 20 August 1967) is a Polish politician. She was elected to the Sejm (9th term) representing the constituency of Toruń. She previously also served in the 8th term of the Sejm (2015–2019). She lived for many years in the city of Włocławek in the province. Kuyavian-Pomeranian Voivodeship.
