= Włodzimierz Tomaszewski =

Polish politician

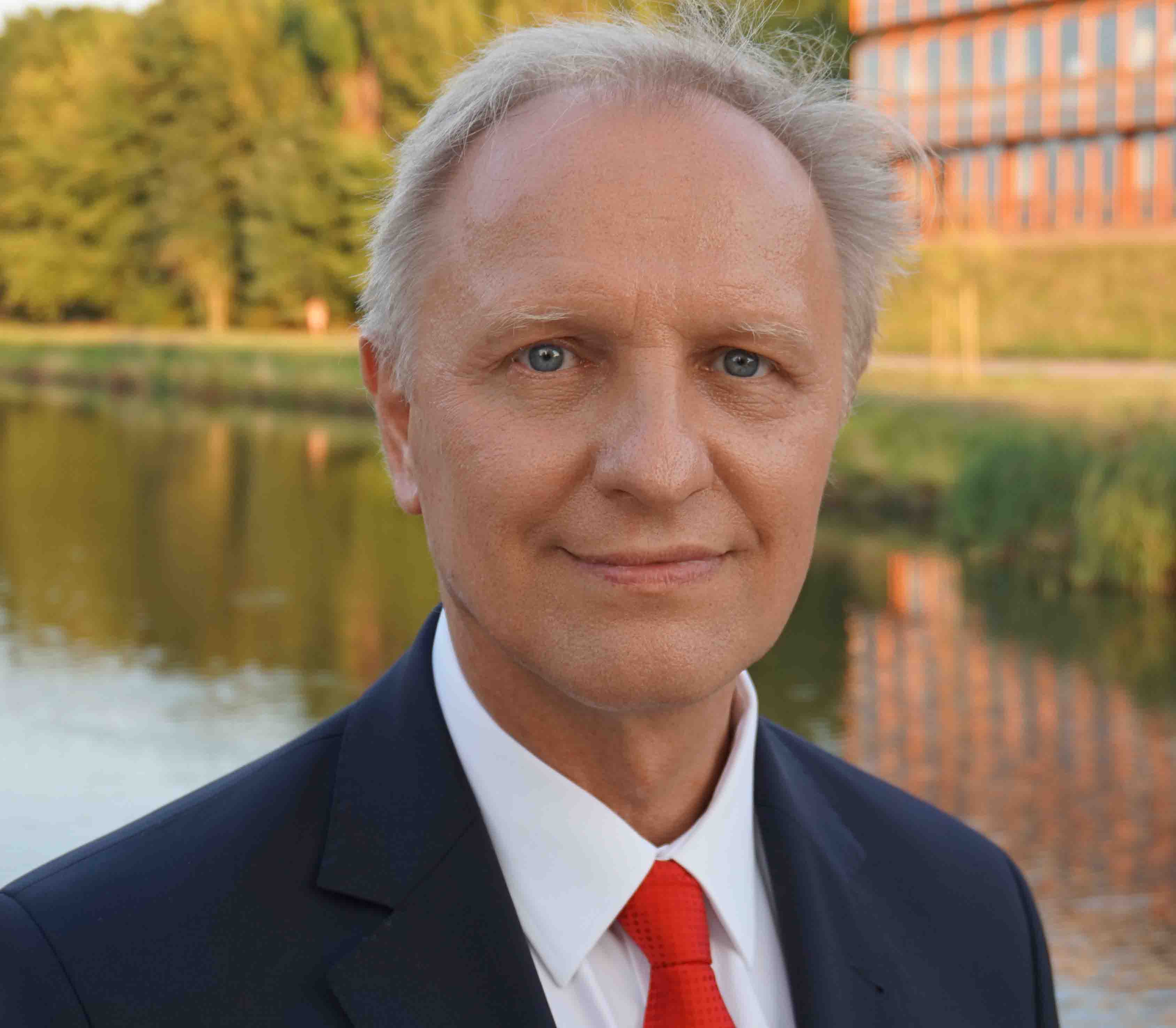

Deputy of the Sejm
- Incumbent
- Assumed office 2024
- Preceded by: Waldemar Buda
- Constituency: 9 Łódź
- In office 2019 – 2023
- Constituency: 9 Łódź

Personal details
- Born: 16 November 1956 (age 68); Łódź, Polish People's Republic
- Political party: Law and Justice

Włodzimierz Tomaszewski (born 16 November 1956 in Łódź) is a Polish politician who was the vice president of Łódź (2002–2010) and a member of the IX and X Sejm.
