= Anna Paluch =

Polish politician (born 1960)

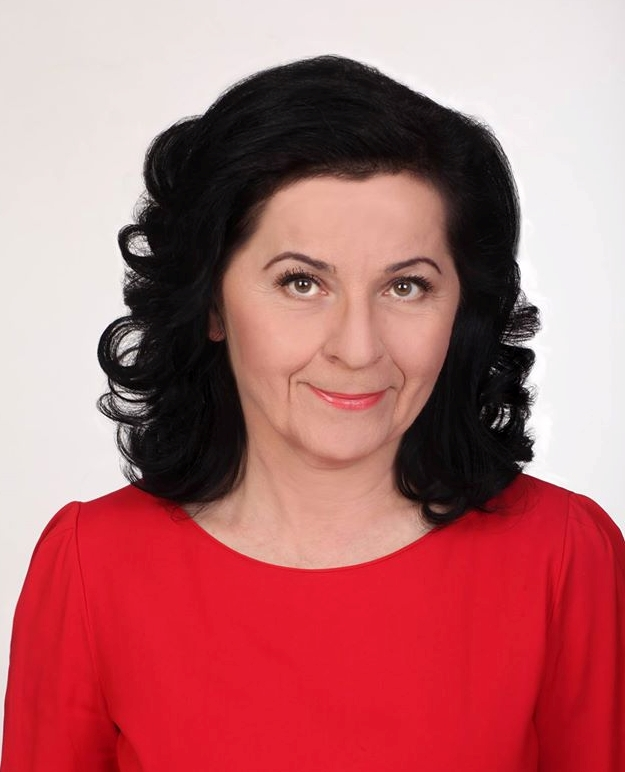

member of Sejm 2005-2007
- Incumbent
- Assumed office 25 September 2005

Personal details
- Born: 1960 (age 65–66) Nowy Targ
- Party: Law and Justice

Anna Paluch (born 31 March 1960) is a Polish politician. She was elected to Sejm on 25 September 2005, getting 9547 votes in 14 Nowy Sącz district as a candidate from the Law and Justice list.

== See also ==
- Members of Polish Sejm 2005-2007
