= Iwona Michałek =

Polish politician (born 1956)

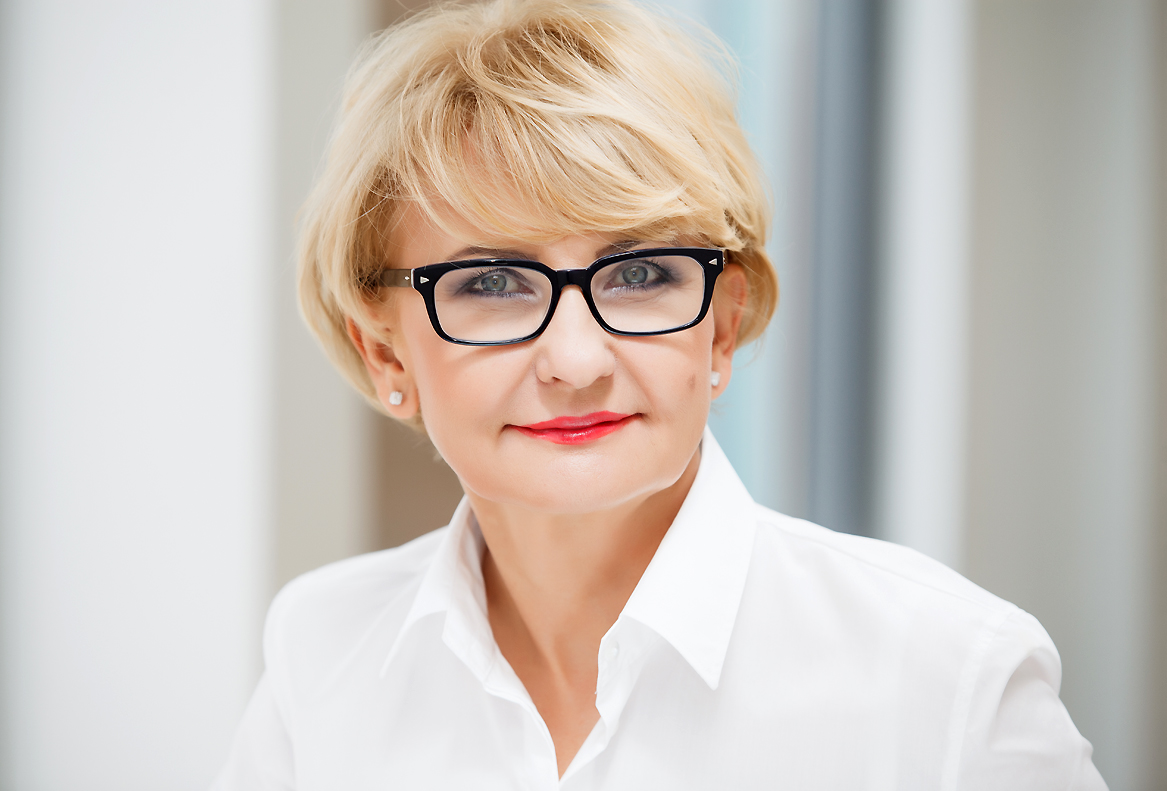
Iwona Michałek

Iwona Krystyna Michałek née Pychyńska (born 13 March 1956 in Szczecin) – is a Polish teacher and politician who is a member of the VIII and IX Sejm. She is a member of the Agreement political party.

She represents the No. 5 (Toruń) constituency.

She is married and has two children - Agata and Maciej.
