= Dariusz Olszewski =

Polish politician (born 1967)

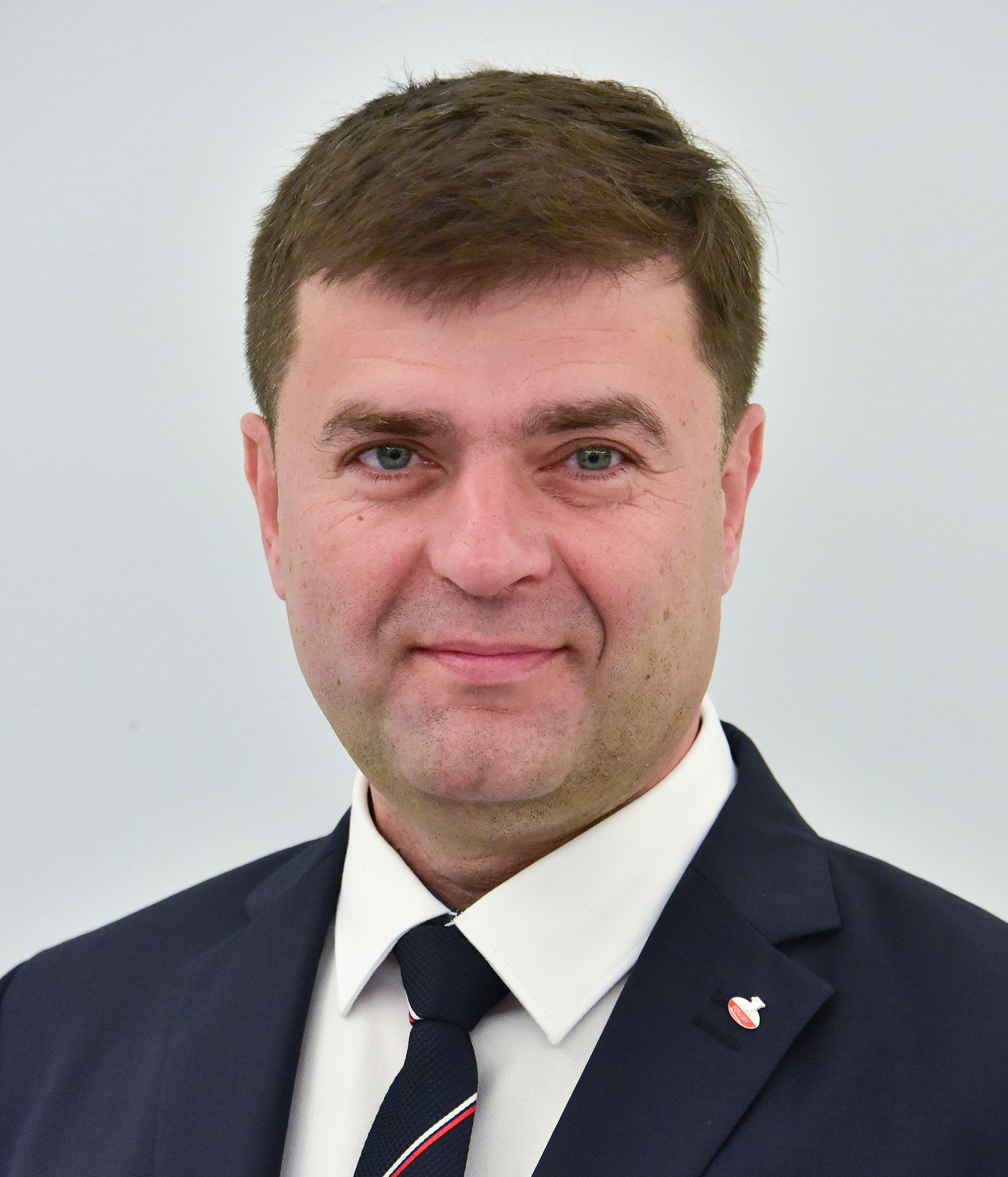
- Dariusz Olszewski, 2019

member of Sejm 2005-2007
- In office 25 September 2005 – 2007

Personal details
- Born: 26 November 1967 (age 58)
- Party: Law and Justice

Dariusz Olszewski (born 26 November 1967 in Otwock) is a Polish politician. He was elected to the Sejm on 25 September 2005, getting 5797 votes in 20 Warsaw district as a candidate from the Law and Justice list.

== See also ==
- Members of Polish Sejm 2005-2007
