= Marek Rutka =

Polish politician

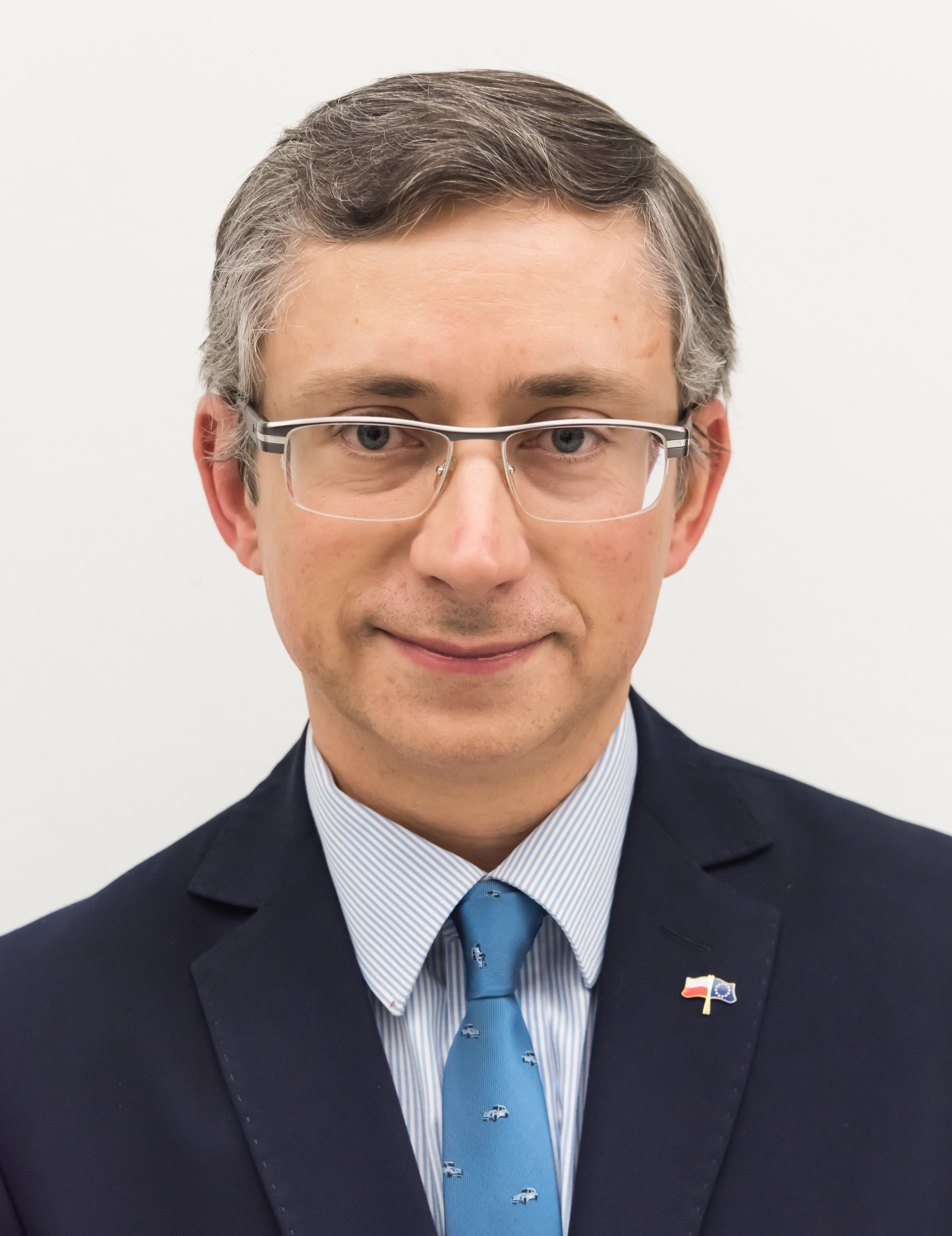

Member of the Sejm
- In office 12 November 2019 – 12 November 2023

Personal details
- Born: 12 June 1975 (age 50) Gdynia, Poland
- Party: New Left
- Other political affiliations: Spring (2019–2021)

Marek Rutka (born 12 June 1975) is a Polish journalist, economist, academic teacher and politician. Member of the Sejm for New Left. Since 2022 he is also a member of National Media Council.

== Electoral history ==
Sejm
Election	Party	Votes	%	Constituency	Elected?
2019	The Left	7,929	1.37	Słupsk	Yes
