= Radosław Fogiel =

Polish politician (born 1982)

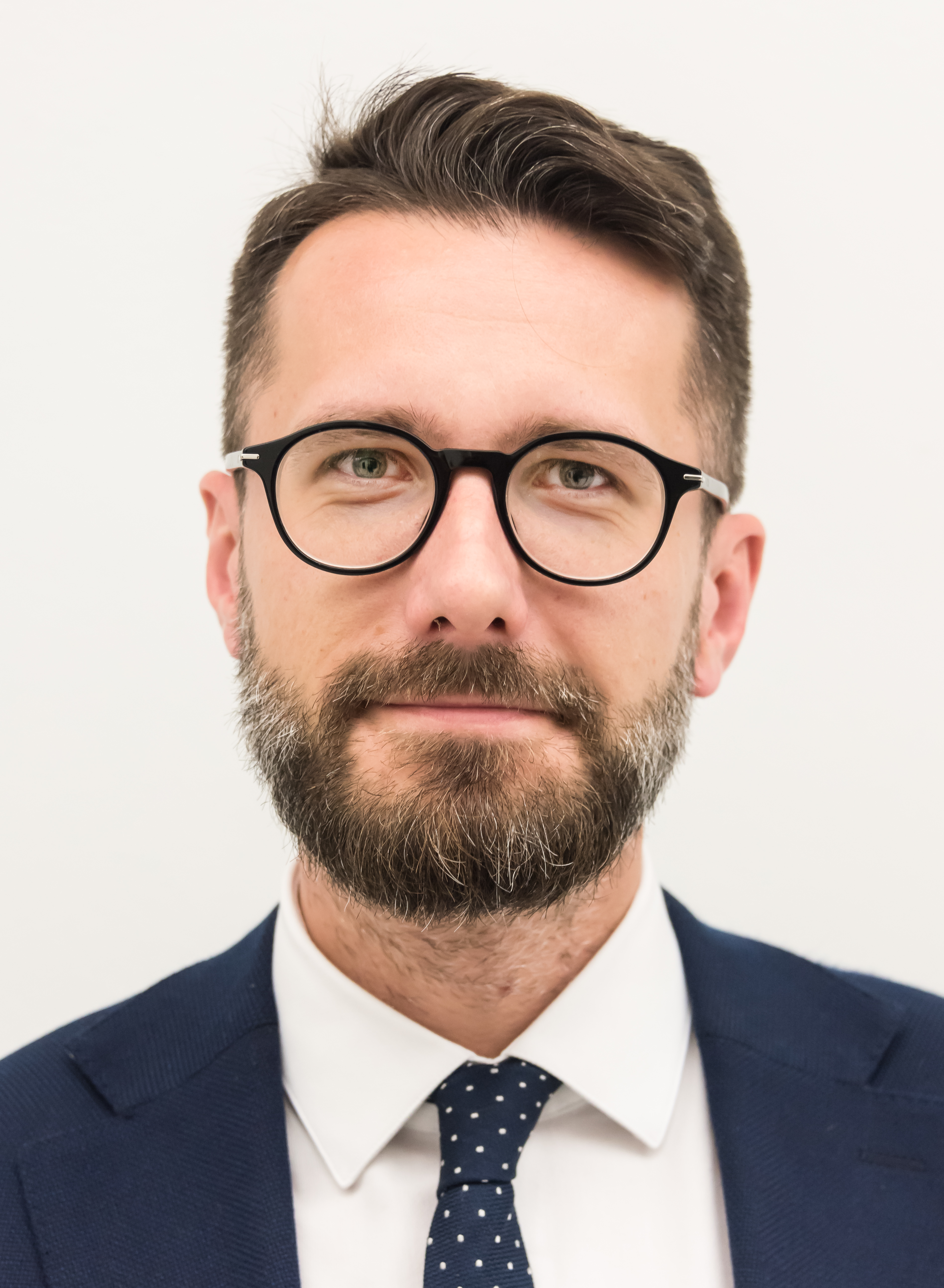

Member of the Radom City Council
- In office 2006–2010

Member of the Masovian Regional Assembly
- In office 2014–2019
- Preceded by: it states

Member of the Sejm
- Incumbent
- Assumed office 2019

Personal details
- Born: 16 February 1982 (age 43); Radom, Poland
- Political party: Law and Justice

Radosław Aleksander Fogiel (born 16 February 1982) is a Polish politician. He is a Member of the Masovian Regional Assembly, the Deputy Chairman of the European Young Conservatives, and an Advisor to Law and Justice Leader Jarosław Kaczyński.

== Biography ==
Fogiel was born on 16 February 1982 in Radom, Poland. He was elected to the Radom City Council in 2006. He became a Member of the Masovian Regional Assembly in 2014. He is the Vice Chairman of the Committee on Agriculture. Fogiel is a close associate of Jarosław Kaczyński, the Leader of Law and Justice. He is Kaczyński's Advisor and Chief of Staff. Fogiel is also Law and Justice's International Secretary and is part of the party's national leadership. He serves as Deputy Chairman of the European Young Conservatives, having previously been Secretary-General.
