= List of Sejm members (2023–2027) =

10th term of the Sejm

The tenth term of the Sejm of the Republic of Poland was elected at the 2023 Polish parliamentary election. They represent 41 electoral districts all of which are multi-member districts.

They sit as part of the lower house of the 10th term Sejm and 11th term Senate of Poland.

== Composition ==
As of 18 February 2026, deputies are affiliated with following parliamentary clubs (klub) and caucuses (koło):

Parliamentary group	Chairperson	Deputies		
Parliamentary group	Chairperson	Initial	Current	+/–
Law and Justice (PiS); Klub Parlamentarny Prawo i Sprawiedliwość	Mariusz Błaszczak	191	186	▼5
Civic Coalition (KO); Klub Parlamentarny Koalicja Obywatelska - Koalicja Obywatelska, Zieloni	Zbigniew Konwiński	157	156	▼1
Polish People's Party (PSL); Klub Parlamentarny Polskie Stronnictwo Ludowe - Trzecia Droga	Piotr Zgorzelski	32	32	Steady
The Left (L); Koalicyjny Klub Parlamentarny Lewicy (Nowa Lewica, PPS, Unia Pracy)	Anna Maria Żukowska	26	21	▼5
Poland 2050 (PL2050); Klub Parlamentarny Polska 2050 - Trzecia Droga	Paweł Śliz	33	15	▼18
Centre Poland (Centrum); Klub Parlamentarny Centrum	Paulina Hennig-Kloska	15	15	▲15
Confederation (KON); Klub Poselski Konfederacja	Grzegorz Płaczek	18	16	▼2
Razem (R); Koło Poselskie Razem	Marcelina Zawisza	—	4	▼1
Direct Democracy (DB) (Note: Kukiz'15 (K'15) caucus was rebranded into Free Republicans (Wolni Republikanie, WR) on 16 October 2024 and then Direct Democracy (Demokracja Bezpośrednia, DB) on 21 January 2026.); Koło Poselskie Demokracja Bezpośrednia	Jarosław Sachajko	3	4	▲1
Confederation of the Polish Crown (KKP); Koło Poselskie Konfederacja Korony Polskiej	Włodzimierz Skalik	—	3	▲3
Non-affiliated (N-A)	—	0	8	▲8
Total		460	460	
Vacancies		—	0	

Composition change through the term
Elected	PiS		KO	TD			L (Note: Officially registered as Nowa Lewica (New Left) party list, which also included candidates of the other Left coalition parties.)		KON			Total	Vacant	Ref
2023-10-15	194		157	65			26		18		—	460	—	
Seated	PiS	K'15	KO	PL2050		PSL	L		KON		N-A			
2023-11-14	191	3	157	33		32	26		18		0	460	0	
2023-12-06	190 ▼	3	157	33		32	26		18		0	459	1 ▲	
2023-12-19	191 ▲	3	157	33		32	26		18		0	460	0 ▼	
2023-12-20	189 ▼	3	157	33		32	26		18		0	458	2 ▲	
2024-01-05	189	3	156 ▼	33		32	26		18		0	457	3 ▲	
2024-01-26	189	3	157 ▲	33		32	26		18		0	458	2 ▼	
2024-03-06	189	3	157	33		32	26		18		1 ▲	459	1 ▼	
2024-03-08	189	3	157	32 ▼		32	26		18		2 ▲	459	1	
2024-03-26	189	3	156 ▼	32		32	26		18		2	458	2 ▲	
2024-04-10	189	3	155 ▼	32		32	26		18		2	457	3 ▲	
2024-04-23	189	3	154 ▼	33		32	26		18		2	456	4 ▲	
2024-04-26	189	3	155 ▲	32		32	26		18		2	457	3 ▼	
2024-05-06	189	3	154 ▼	32		32	26		18		2	456	4 ▲	
2024-05-08	189	3	156 ▲	32		32	26		18		2	458	2 ▼	
2024-05-22	189	3	157 ▲	32		32	26		18		2	459	1 ▼	
2024-06-10	182 ▼	3	145 ▼	31 ▼		31 ▼	24 ▼		16 ▼		2	434	26 ▲	
2024-06-26	189 ▲	3	155 ▲	32 ▲		31	26 ▲		18 ▲		1 ▼	455	5 ▼	
2024-06-28	190 ▲	3	157 ▲	32		31	26		18		1	458	2 ▼	
2024-07-23	190	3	157	32		32 ▲	26		18		2 ▲	460	0	
2024-07-24	190	4 ▲	157	32		32 ▲	26		18		1 ▼	460	0	
2024-08-10	190	4	156 ▼	32		32	26		18		1	459	1 ▲	
2024-10-16	PiS	WR	KO	PL2050		PSL	L		KON		N-A	459	1	
2024-10-16	190	4	156	32		32	26		18		1	459	1	
2024-10-27	190	4	156	32		32	21 ▼		18		6 ▲	459	1	
2024-11-06	PiS	WR	KO	PL2050		PSL	L	R	KON		N-A	460	0 ▼	
2024-11-06	190	4	157 ▲	32		32	21	5 ▲	18		1 ▼	460	0 ▼	
2025-03-10	190	4	157	32		32	21	5	16 ▼		3 ▲	460	0	
2025-06-04	PiS	WR	KO	PL2050		PSL	L	R	KON	KKP	N-A	460	0	
2025-06-04	189 ▼	4	157	32		32	21	5	16	3 ▲	1 ▼	460	0	
2025-07-08	189	4	157	31 ▼		32	21	5	16	3	2 ▲	460	0	
2025-08-05	189	4	157	30 ▼		32	21	5	16	3	3 ▲	460	0	
2025-08-07	185 ▼	4	157	31 ▼		32	21	5	16	3	3	456	4 ▲	
2025-09-09	188 ▲	4	157	30		32	21	5	16	3	4 ▲	460	0 ▼	
2025-10-16	188	4	157	31 ▼		32	21	5	16	3	3 ▼	460	0	
2025-11-05	188	4	156 ▼	31		32	21	5	16	3	4 ▲	460	0	
2025-11-13	188	4	156	31		32	21	4 ▼	16	3	5 ▲	460	0	
2026-01-21	PiS	DB	KO	PL2050		PSL	L	R	KON	KKP	N-A	460	0	
2026-01-27	188	4	156	31		32	21	3 ▼	16	3	6 ▲	460	0	
2026-01-28	188	4	156	31		32	21	3	16	4 ▲	5 ▼	460	0	
2026-02-17	188	4	156	30 ▼		32	21	3	16	4	6 ▲	460	0	
2026-02-18	PiS	DB	KO	PL2050	CP	PSL	L	R	KON	KKP	N-A	Total	Vacant	Ref
2026-02-18	188	4	156	15 ▼	15 ▲	32	21	3	16	4	6 ▲	460	0	
2026-04-23	188	4	156	15	15	32	20 ▼	3	16	4	6	459	1 ▲	
2026-04-29	187 ▼	4	156	15	15	32	20	3	16	4	7 ▲	459	1	
2026-04-30	186 ▼	4	156	15	15	32	20	3	16	4	8 ▲	459	1	
2026-05-15	188	4	156	15	15	32	21 ▲	3	16	4	6	460	0 ▼	

== List of members ==
All 460 members were elected in 41 multiple-seats constituencies on 15 October 2023:

Key
grey background	Indicates members who left their seat during the term.
beige background	Indicates members who replaced former members.

Const.	Electoral list	Member	Parliamentary group	Party	No. of votes	% of votes
1	Third Way	Tadeusz Samborski	Polish People's Party	Polish People's Party	16,120	3.21
1	The Left	Arkadiusz Sikora	The Left	New Left	12,048	2.40
1	Law and Justice	Elżbieta Witek	Law and Justice	Law and Justice	89,172	17.77
1	Law and Justice	Marzena Machałek	Law and Justice	Law and Justice	18,363	3.66
1	Law and Justice	Szymon Pogoda	Law and Justice	Law and Justice	10,117	2.02
1	Law and Justice	Krzysztof Kubów	Law and Justice	Law and Justice	15,928	3.17
1	Law and Justice	Wojciech Zubowski	Law and Justice	Law and Justice	8,527	1.70
1	Civic Coalition	Zofia Czernow	Civic Coalition	Civic Coalition	30,258	6.03
1	Civic Coalition	Robert Kropiwnicki	Civic Coalition	Civic Coalition	31,838	6.34
1	Civic Coalition	Piotr Borys	Civic Coalition	Civic Coalition	44,912	8.95
1	Civic Coalition	Iwona Krawczyk	Civic Coalition	Civic Coalition	8,831	1.76
1	Civic Coalition	Łukasz Horbatowski	Civic Coalition	Civic Coalition	13,934	2.78
2	Third Way	Aleksandra Leo	Centre Poland	Centre Poland	16,661	5.15
2	Law and Justice	Marcin Gwóźdź	Law and Justice	Law and Justice	23,434	7.25
2	Law and Justice	Michał Dworczyk (Note: Member until 10 June 2024. Elected member of the European Parliament.)	Law and Justice	Law and Justice	40,264	12.45
2	Law and Justice	Ireneusz Zyska	Law and Justice	Law and Justice	11,817	3.65
2	Law and Justice	Grzegorz Macko (Note: Replaced Michał Dworczyk. Sworn in on 28 June 2024.)	Law and Justice	Law and Justice	10,781	3.33
2	Civic Coalition	Monika Wielichowska	Civic Coalition	Civic Coalition	52,182	16.14
2	Civic Coalition	Izabela Mrzygłocka (Note: Died 10 August 2024.)	Civic Coalition	Civic Platform	14,470	4.47
2	Civic Coalition	Robert Jagła (Note: Replaced Izabela Mrzygłocka. Sworn in on 6 November 2024.)	Civic Coalition	Civic Coalition	5,676	1.76
2	Civic Coalition	Marek Chmielewski	Civic Coalition	Civic Coalition	9,108	2.82
2	Civic Coalition	Sylwia Bielawska	Civic Coalition	Independent	17,577	5.44
3	Third Way	Tomasz Zimoch	Non-affiliated	Independent	34,187	4.41
3	Third Way	Izabela Bodnar	Centre Poland	Centre Poland	26,404	3.40
3	The Left	Krzysztof Śmiszek	The Left	New Left	34,577	4.46
3	The Left	Marta Stożek (Note: Replaced Krzysztof Śmiszek. Sworn in on 26 June 2024.)	Razem	Razem	19,434	2.50
3	Law and Justice	Mirosława Stachowiak-Różecka	Law and Justice	Law and Justice	97,193	12.52
3	Law and Justice	Paweł Hreniak	Law and Justice	Law and Justice	19,384	2.50
3	Law and Justice	Agnieszka Soin	Law and Justice	Law and Justice	18,645	2.40
3	Law and Justice	Jacek Świat	Law and Justice	Law and Justice	13,663	1.76
3	Confederation	Krzysztof Tuduj	Confederation	National Movement	25,922	3.34
3	Civic Coalition	Alicja Chybicka	Civic Coalition	Independent	78,816	10.16
3	Civic Coalition	Małgorzata Tracz	Civic Coalition	The Greens	17,693	2.28
3	Civic Coalition	Michał Jaros	Civic Coalition	Civic Coalition	30,512	3.93
3	Civic Coalition	Bogdan Zdrojewski	Civic Coalition	Civic Coalition	85,099	10.97
3	Civic Coalition	Anna Sobolak	Civic Coalition	Civic Coalition	7,675	0.99
3	Civic Coalition	Jolanta Niezgodzka	Civic Coalition	Civic Coalition	7,262	0.94
3	Civic Coalition	Krzysztof Mieszkowski (Note: Replaced Bogdan Zdrojewski. Sworn in on 26 June 2024.)	Civic Coalition	Civic Coalition	7,031	0.91
4	Third Way	Norbert Pietrykowski	Centre Poland	Centre Poland	27,596	5.17
4	Third Way	Agnieszka Kłopotek	Polish People's Party	Polish People's Party	11,049	2.07
4	The Left	Krzysztof Gawkowski	The Left	New Left	21,831	4.09
4	Law and Justice	Paweł Szrot	Law and Justice	Independent	20,214	3.79
4	Law and Justice	Łukasz Schreiber	Law and Justice	Law and Justice	44,413	8.32
4	Law and Justice	Bartosz Kownacki	Law and Justice	Law and Justice	17,135	3.21
4	Law and Justice	Piotr Król	Law and Justice	Law and Justice	17,952	3.36
4	Civic Coalition	Paweł Olszewski	Civic Coalition	Civic Coalition	35,289	6.61
4	Civic Coalition	Iwona Kozłowska	Civic Coalition	Civic Coalition	14,514	2.72
4	Civic Coalition	Krzysztof Brejza (Note: Member until 5 January 2023. Replaced Radosław Sikorski in the European Parliament.)	Civic Coalition	Civic Platform	89,840	16.83
4	Civic Coalition	Włodzisław Giziński	Civic Coalition	Civic Coalition	13,630	2.55
4	Civic Coalition	Iwona Karolewska	Civic Coalition	Independent	8,572	1.61
4	Civic Coalition	Magdalena Łośko (Note: Replaced Krzysztof Brejza. Sworn in on 26 January 2024.)	Civic Coalition	Civic Coalition	4,864	0.91
5	Third Way	Zbigniew Sosnowski	Polish People's Party	Polish People's Party	27,070	5.04
5	Third Way	Marcin Skonieczka	Centre Poland	Centre Poland	11,864	2.21
5	The Left	Joanna Scheuring-Wielgus	The Left	New Left	35,193	6.55
5	The Left	Piotr Kowal (Note: Replaced Joanna Scheuring-Wielgas. Sworn in on 26 June 2024.)	The Left	New Left	7,860	1.46
5	Law and Justice	Krzysztof Szczucki	Law and Justice	Law and Justice	34,014	6.33
5	Law and Justice	Joanna Borowiak	Law and Justice	Law and Justice	25,995	4.84
5	Law and Justice	Anna Gembicka	Law and Justice	Law and Justice	25,993	4.84
5	Law and Justice	Jan Krzysztof Ardanowski	Direct Democracy	Freedom and Prosperity	28,658	5.33
5	Law and Justice	Mariusz Kałużny	Law and Justice	Law and Justice	19,072	3.55
5	Confederation	Przemysław Wipler	Confederation	New Hope	13,457	2.50
5	Civic Coalition	Arkadiusz Myrcha	Civic Coalition	Civic Coalition	64,452	11.99
5	Civic Coalition	Iwona Hartwich	Civic Coalition	Independent	17,889	3.33
5	Civic Coalition	Tomasz Szymański	Civic Coalition	Civic Coalition	17,825	3.32
5	Civic Coalition	Krystian Łuczak	Civic Coalition	Civic Coalition	16,451	3.06
6	Third Way	Joanna Mucha	Poland 2050	Poland 2050	32,563	5.02
6	Third Way	Krzysztof Hetman	Polish People's Party	Polish People's Party	28,876	4.45
6	Third Way	Henryk Smolarz (Note: Replaced Krzysztof Hetman. Sworn in on 23 July 2024.)	Polish People's Party	Polish People's Party	5,536	0.85
6	The Left	Jacek Czerniak	The Left	New Left	10,910	1.68
6	Law and Justice	Przemysław Czarnek	Law and Justice	Law and Justice	121,686	18.77
6	Law and Justice	Michał Moskal	Law and Justice	Law and Justice	21,958	3.39
6	Law and Justice	Magdalena Filipek-Sobczak	Law and Justice	Law and Justice	10,480	1.62
6	Law and Justice	Sylwester Tułajew	Law and Justice	Law and Justice	10,228	1.58
6	Law and Justice	Artur Soboń (Note: Member until 6 December 2023. Appointed a member of the NBP Management Board.)	Law and Justice	Law and Justice	32,357	4.99
6	Law and Justice	Sławomir Skwarek	Law and Justice	Law and Justice	12,427	1.92
6	Law and Justice	Kazimierz Choma	Law and Justice	Law and Justice	8,363	1.29
6	Law and Justice	Jan Kanthak	Law and Justice	Law and Justice	22,037	3.40
6	Law and Justice	Anna Baluch (Note: Replaced Artur Soboń. Sworn in on 19 December 2023.)	Law and Justice	Law and Justice	7,686	1.19
6	Confederation	Bartłomiej Pejo	Confederation	New Hope	26,037	4.02
6	Civic Coalition	Marta Wcisło	Civic Coalition	Civic Platform	68,449	10.56
6	Civic Coalition	Michał Krawczyk	Civic Coalition	Civic Coalition	12,009	1.85
6	Civic Coalition	Krzysztof Bojarski	Civic Coalition	Civic Coalition	10,672	1.65
6	Civic Coalition	Bożena Lisowska (Note: Replaced Marta Wcisło. Sworn in on 26 June 2024.)	Civic Coalition	Civic Coalition	6,935	1.07
7	Third Way	Wiesław Różyński	Polish People's Party	Polish People's Party	17,237	3.77
7	Third Way	Sławomir Ćwik	Centre Poland	Centre Poland	8,004	1.75
7	Law and Justice	Mariusz Kamiński (Note: Member until 20 December 2023. Loss of right to stand for election, due to a sentence for an intentional crime prosecuted ex officio.)	Law and Justice	Law and Justice	44,195	9.67
7	Law and Justice	Tomasz Zieliński	Law and Justice	Law and Justice	13,469	2.95
7	Law and Justice	Dariusz Stefaniuk	Law and Justice	Law and Justice	29,710	6.50
7	Law and Justice	Marcin Romanowski	Law and Justice	Law and Justice	17,318	3.79
7	Law and Justice	Anna Dąbrowska-Banaszek	Law and Justice	Independent	13,910	3.04
7	Law and Justice	Sławomir Zawiślak	KKP	KKP	10,936	2.39
7	Law and Justice	Jarosław Sachajko	Direct Democracy	Kukiz'15	33,727	7.38
7	Law and Justice	Monika Pawłowska (Note: Replaced Mariusz Kamiński. Sworn in on 6 March 2024.)	Law and Justice	Law and Justice	10,789	2.36
7	Confederation	Witold Tumanowicz	Confederation	National Movement	14,387	3.15
7	Civic Coalition	Krzysztof Grabczuk	Civic Coalition	Civic Coalition	32,985	7.22
7	Civic Coalition	Małgorzata Gromadzka	Civic Coalition	Civic Coalition	10,710	2.34
8	Third Way	Maja Nowak	Poland 2050	Poland 2050	25,109	4.86
8	Third Way	Stanisław Tomczyszyn	Polish People's Party	Polish People's Party	10,332	2.00
8	The Left	Anita Kucharska-Dziedzic	The Left	New Left	23,051	4.46
8	Law and Justice	Marek Ast	Law and Justice	Law and Justice	36,365	7.03
8	Law and Justice	Władysław Dajczak	Law and Justice	Law and Justice	29,131	5.63
8	Law and Justice	Jerzy Materna	Law and Justice	Law and Justice	17,470	3.38
8	Law and Justice	Łukasz Mejza	Non-affiliated	Independent	10,162	1.97
8	Civic Coalition	Elżbieta Polak	Civic Coalition	Civic Coalition	78,475	15.18
8	Civic Coalition	Waldemar Sługocki	Civic Coalition	Civic Coalition	25,037	4.84
8	Civic Coalition	Krystyna Sibińska	Civic Coalition	Civic Coalition	19,415	3.76
8	Civic Coalition	Robert Dowhan	Civic Coalition	Civic Coalition	14,761	2.85
8	Civic Coalition	Katarzyna Osos	Civic Coalition	Civic Coalition	11,832	2.29
9	Third Way	Ewa Szymanowska	Centre Poland	Centre Poland	26,185	5.74
9	The Left	Tomasz Trela	The Left	New Left	26,273	5.75
9	Law and Justice	Zbigniew Rau	Law and Justice	Law and Justice	32,387	7.09
9	Law and Justice	Waldemar Buda	Law and Justice	Law and Justice	45,474	9.96
9	Law and Justice	Włodzimierz Tomaszewski (Note: Replaced Waldemar Buda. Sworn in on 26 June 2024.)	Law and Justice	Law and Justice	9,247	2.03
9	Law and Justice	Agnieszka Wojciechowska van Heukelom	Law and Justice	Independent	10,557	2.31
9	Civic Coalition	Dariusz Joński	Civic Coalition	Polish Initiative	87,470	19.16
9	Civic Coalition	Małgorzata Niemczyk	Civic Coalition	Civic Coalition	20,959	4.59
9	Civic Coalition	Krzysztof Piątkowski (Note: Replaced Dariusz Joński. Sworn in on 26 June 2024.)	Civic Coalition	Civic Coalition	7,018	1.54
9	Civic Coalition	Aleksandra Wiśniewska	Civic Coalition	Independent	25,436	5.57
9	Civic Coalition	Paweł Bliźniuk	Civic Coalition	Civic Coalition	12,315	2.70
9	Civic Coalition	Marcin Józefaciuk	Non-affiliated	Independent	8,893	1.95
10	Third Way	Dariusz Klimczak	Polish People's Party	Polish People's Party	21,826	5.50
10	Law and Justice	Antoni Macierewicz	Law and Justice	Law and Justice	32,496	8.19
10	Law and Justice	Robert Telus	Law and Justice	Law and Justice	49,262	12.41
10	Law and Justice	Anna Milczanowska	Law and Justice	Law and Justice	22,595	5.69
10	Law and Justice	Paweł Sałek	Law and Justice	Independent	15,200	3.83
10	Law and Justice	Grzegorz Lorek	Law and Justice	Law and Justice	19,711	4.97
10	Law and Justice	Krzysztof Ciecióra	Law and Justice	Independent	10,426	2.63
10	Civic Coalition	Bogusław Wołoszański	Civic Coalition	Independent	35,202	8.87
10	Civic Coalition	Adrian Witczak	Civic Coalition	Civic Coalition	16,287	4.10
11	Third Way	Paweł Bejda	Polish People's Party	Polish People's Party	25,363	4.76
11	Third Way	Jolanta Zięba-Gzik	Polish People's Party	Polish People's Party	10,474	1.96
11	The Left	Paulina Matysiak	Non-affiliated	Independent	17,695	3.32
11	Law and Justice	Joanna Lichocka	Law and Justice	Law and Justice	36,060	6.76
11	Law and Justice	Tadeusz Woźniak	Law and Justice	Law and Justice	19,691	3.69
11	Law and Justice	Marcin Przydacz (Note: Member until 7 August 2025. Appointed state secretary of the presidential chancellery.)	Law and Justice	Independent	30,423	5.71
11	Law and Justice	Piotr Polak	Law and Justice	Law and Justice	23,845	4.47
11	Law and Justice	Paweł Rychlik	Law and Justice	Law and Justice	27,361	5.13
11	Law and Justice	Marek Matuszewski	Law and Justice	Law and Justice	17,412	3.27
11	Law and Justice	Tomasz Rzymkowski (Note: Replaced Marcin Przydacz. Sworn in on 9 September 2025.)	Direct Democracy	Independent	16,875	3.17
11	Civic Coalition	Cezary Tomczyk	Civic Coalition	Civic Coalition	69,211	12.98
11	Civic Coalition	Agnieszka Hanajczyk	Civic Coalition	Civic Coalition	16,865	3.16
11	Civic Coalition	Krzysztof Habura	Civic Coalition	Civic Coalition	11,267	2.11
12	Third Way	Paweł Śliz	Poland 2050	Poland 2050	19,630	5.38
12	Law and Justice	Rafał Bochenek	Law and Justice	Law and Justice	42,142	11.56
12	Law and Justice	Mariusz Krystian	Law and Justice	Law and Justice	11,366	3.12
12	Law and Justice	Łukasz Kmita	Law and Justice	Law and Justice	26,062	7.15
12	Law and Justice	Filip Kaczyński	Law and Justice	Law and Justice	18,285	5.01
12	Law and Justice	Władysław Kurowski	Law and Justice	Law and Justice	12,320	3.38
12	Civic Coalition	Dorota Niedziela	Civic Coalition	Civic Coalition	28,783	7.89
12	Civic Coalition	Marek Sowa	Civic Coalition	Civic Coalition	24,652	6.76
13	Third Way	Rafał Komarewicz	Centre Poland	Centre Poland	44,808	5.92
13	Third Way	Ireneusz Raś	Polish People's Party	Centre for Poland	27,518	3.63
13	The Left	Daria Gosek-Popiołek	The Left	Independent	39,054	5.16
13	Law and Justice	Małgorzata Wassermann	Law and Justice	Independent	125,786	16.60
13	Law and Justice	Andrzej Adamczyk	Law and Justice	Law and Justice	45,171	5.96
13	Law and Justice	Jacek Osuch	Law and Justice	Law and Justice	10,386	1.37
13	Law and Justice	Elżbieta Duda	Law and Justice	Law and Justice	11,388	1.50
13	Law and Justice	Agnieszka Ścigaj	Law and Justice	Independent	6,262	0.83
13	Confederation	Konrad Berkowicz	Confederation	New Hope	36,918	4.87
13	Civic Coalition	Bartłomiej Sienkiewicz	Civic Coalition	Civic Platform	95,873	12.66
13	Civic Coalition	Jagna Marczułajtis-Walczak	Civic Coalition	Civic Coalition	35,573	4.70
13	Civic Coalition	Aleksander Miszalski (Note: Member until 23 April 2024. Elected mayor of Kraków.)	Civic Coalition	Civic Platform	29,414	3.88
13	Civic Coalition	Dorota Marek	Civic Coalition	Civic Coalition	14,141	1.87
13	Civic Coalition	Katarzyna Matusik-Lipiec	Civic Coalition	Civic Coalition	9,261	1.22
13	Civic Coalition	Dominik Jaśkowiec (Note: Replaced Aleksander Miszalski. Sworn in on 8 May 2024.)	Civic Coalition	Civic Coalition	6,093	0.80
13	Civic Coalition	Jerzy Meysztowicz (Note: Replaced Jagna Marczułajtis-Walczak. Sworn in on 26 June 2024.)	Civic Coalition	Civic Coalition	5,408	0.71
13	Civic Coalition	Aleksandra Kot (Note: Replaced Bartłomiej Sienkiewicz. Sworn in on 28 June 2024.)	Civic Coalition	Civic Coalition	4,942	0.65
14	Third Way	Urszula Nowogórska	Polish People's Party	Polish People's Party	24,388	5.71
14	Law and Justice	Ryszard Terlecki	Law and Justice	Law and Justice	29,882	6.99
14	Law and Justice	Arkadiusz Mularczyk	Law and Justice	Law and Justice	62,758	14.69
14	Law and Justice	Barbara Bartuś	Law and Justice	Law and Justice	21,250	4.97
14	Law and Justice	Edward Siarka	Law and Justice	Law and Justice	18,587	4.35
14	Law and Justice	Patryk Wicher	Law and Justice	Law and Justice	18,604	4.35
14	Law and Justice	Andrzej Gut-Mostowy	Law and Justice	Independent	16,467	3.85
14	Law and Justice	Anna Paluch (Note: Replaced Arkadiusz Mularczyk. Sworn in on 26 June 2024.)	Law and Justice	Law and Justice	14,616	3.42
14	Confederation	Ryszard Wilk	Confederation	New Hope	19,374	4.53
14	Civic Coalition	Weronika Smarduch	Civic Coalition	Civic Coalition	27,031	6.33
14	Civic Coalition	Piotr Lachowicz	Civic Coalition	Independent	12,918	3.02
15	Third Way	Władysław Kosiniak-Kamysz	Polish People's Party	Polish People's Party	50,139	12.42
15	Third Way	Piotr Górnikiewicz	Poland 2050	Poland 2050	5,180	1.28
15	Law and Justice	Anna Pieczarka	Law and Justice	Law and Justice	71,199	17.64
15	Law and Justice	Józefa Szczurek-Żelazko	Law and Justice	Law and Justice	26,231	6.50
15	Law and Justice	Urszula Rusecka	Law and Justice	Law and Justice	17,080	4.23
15	Law and Justice	Wiesław Krajewski	Law and Justice	Law and Justice	24,838	6.15
15	Law and Justice	Norbert Kaczmarczyk	Law and Justice	Law and Justice	11,926	2.95
15	Civic Coalition	Urszula Augustyn	Civic Coalition	Civic Coalition	27,047	6.70
15	Civic Coalition	Robert Wardzała	Civic Coalition	Civic Coalition	9,265	2.30
16	Third Way	Piotr Zgorzelski	Polish People's Party	Polish People's Party	32,011	7.23
16	Third Way	Mirosław Orliński	Polish People's Party	Polish People's Party	9,066	2.05
16	Law and Justice	Kamil Bortniczuk	Law and Justice	Law and Justice	31,555	7.13
16	Law and Justice	Maciej Małecki	Law and Justice	Law and Justice	33,696	7.61
16	Law and Justice	Maciej Wąsik	Law and Justice	Law and Justice	24,033	5.43
16	Law and Justice	Anna Cicholska	Law and Justice	Law and Justice	19,074	4.31
16	Law and Justice	Jacek Ozdoba	Law and Justice	Sovereign Poland	19,637	4.44
16	Law and Justice	Wioletta Kulpa (Note: Replaced Maciej Wąsik. Sworn in on 28 June 2024.)	Law and Justice	Law and Justice	18,283	4.13
16	Law and Justice	Rafał Romanowski (Note: Replaced Jacek Ozdoba. Sworn in on 23 July 2024.)	Law and Justice	Law and Justice	14,831	3.35
16	Civic Coalition	Marcin Kierwiński	Civic Coalition	Civic Platform	51,828	11.71
16	Civic Coalition	Elżbieta Gapińska	Civic Coalition	Civic Coalition	13,214	2.99
16	Civic Coalition	Adam Krzemiński	Civic Coalition	Civic Coalition	6,071	1.37
16	Civic Coalition	Maria Koźlakiewicz (Note: Replaced Maciej Kierwiński. Sworn in on 26 June 2024.)	Civic Coalition	Civic Coalition	4,535	1.02
17	Third Way	Mirosław Maliszewski	Polish People's Party	Polish People's Party	17,857	4.56
17	Law and Justice	Marek Suski	Law and Justice	Law and Justice	37,853	9.68
17	Law and Justice	Anna Kwiecień	Law and Justice	Independent	34,570	8.84
17	Law and Justice	Zbigniew Kuźmiuk	Law and Justice	Law and Justice	24,702	6.31
17	Law and Justice	Radosław Fogiel	Law and Justice	Law and Justice	32,791	8.38
17	Law and Justice	Andrzej Kosztowniak	Law and Justice	Law and Justice	9,755	2.49
17	Law and Justice	Agnieszka Górska	Law and Justice	Law and Justice	11,494	2.94
17	Civic Coalition	Joanna Kluzik-Rostkowska	Civic Coalition	Civic Coalition	21,218	5.42
17	Civic Coalition	Konrad Frysztak	Civic Coalition	Civic Coalition	25,416	6.50
18	Third Way	Marek Sawicki	Polish People's Party	Polish People's Party	25,534	4.73
18	Third Way	Żaneta Cwalina-Śliwowska	Centre Poland	Centre Poland	9,747	1.81
18	Law and Justice	Maria Koc	Law and Justice	Law and Justice	70,732	13.11
18	Law and Justice	Krzysztof Tchórzewski	Law and Justice	Law and Justice	25,867	4.80
18	Law and Justice	Henryk Kowalczyk	Law and Justice	Law and Justice	30,081	5.58
18	Law and Justice	Arkadiusz Czartoryski	Law and Justice	Law and Justice	15,845	2.94
18	Law and Justice	Grzegorz Woźniak	Law and Justice	Law and Justice	9,088	1.68
18	Law and Justice	Marcin Grabowski	Law and Justice	Law and Justice	10,339	1.9
18	Law and Justice	Daniel Milewski	Law and Justice	Law and Justice	44,145	8.18
18	Confederation	Krzysztof Mulawa	Confederation	National Movement	14,043	2.60
18	Civic Coalition	Kamila Gasiuk-Pihowicz	Civic Coalition	Civic Platform	57,609	10.68
18	Civic Coalition	Czesław Mroczek	Civic Coalition	Civic Coalition	11,648	2.16
18	Civic Coalition	Mariusz Popielarz (Note: Replaced Kamila Gasiuk-Pihowicz. Sworn in on 26 June 2024.)	Civic Coalition	Civic Coalition	5,009	0.93
19	Third Way	Michał Kobosko	Poland 2050	Poland 2050	61,452	3.58
19	Third Way	Władysław Bartoszewski	Polish People's Party	Polish People's Party	34,563	2.02
19	Third Way	Bożenna Hołownia (Note: Replaced Michał Kobosko. Sworn in on 26 June 2024.)	Poland 2050	Independent	22,593	1.32
19	Third Way	Ryszard Petru	Centre Poland	Centre Poland	24,192	1.41
19	The Left	Adrian Zandberg	Razem	Razem	64,435	3.76
19	The Left	Anna Maria Żukowska	The Left	New Left	38,426	2.24
19	The Left	Dorota Olko	The Left	Independent	44,188	2.58
19	Law and Justice	Piotr Gliński	Law and Justice	Law and Justice	135,339	7.89
19	Law and Justice	Małgorzata Gosiewska	Law and Justice	Law and Justice	36,523	2.13
19	Law and Justice	Sebastian Kaleta	Law and Justice	Law and Justice	31,369	1.83
19	Law and Justice	Jarosław Krajewski (Note: Replaced Małgorzata Gosiewska. Sworn in on 26 June 2024.)	Law and Justice	Law and Justice	24,703	1.44
19	Law and Justice	Marek Jakubiak	Non-affiliated	Federation for the Republic	39,151	2.28
19	Confederation	Sławomir Mentzen	Confederation	New Hope	101,269	5.91
19	Civic Coalition	Donald Tusk	Civic Coalition	Civic Coalition	538,634	31.41
19	Civic Coalition	Urszula Zielińska	Civic Coalition	The Greens	16,470	0.96
19	Civic Coalition	Aleksandra Gajewska	Civic Coalition	Civic Coalition	49,428	2.88
19	Civic Coalition	Katarzyna Lubnauer	Civic Coalition	Civic Coalition	22,529	1.31
19	Civic Coalition	Andrzej Domański	Civic Coalition	Civic Coalition	6,848	0.40
19	Civic Coalition	Katarzyna Piekarska	Civic Coalition	Civic Coalition	8,748	0.51
19	Civic Coalition	Michał Szczerba	Civic Coalition	Civic Platform	28,653	1.67
19	Civic Coalition	Dorota Łoboda	Civic Coalition	Independent	10,510	0.61
19	Civic Coalition	Klaudia Jachira	Civic Coalition	The Greens	9,172	0.53
19	Civic Coalition	Magdalena Roguska (Note: Replaced Michał Szczerba. Sworn in on 26 June 2024.)	Civic Coalition	Civic Coalition	6,193	0.36
20	Third Way	Paweł Zalewski	Non-affilated	Independent	35,395	4.84
20	Third Way	Bożena Żelazowska	Polish People's Party	Polish People's Party	17,416	2.38
20	The Left	Joanna Wicha	The Left	Independent	15,324	2.10
20	Law and Justice	Mariusz Błaszczak	Law and Justice	Law and Justice	127,578	17.46
20	Law and Justice	Anita Czerwińska	Law and Justice	Law and Justice	18,443	2.52
20	Law and Justice	Piotr Uściński	Law and Justice	Law and Justice	15,006	2.05
20	Law and Justice	Dominika Chorosińska	Law and Justice	Law and Justice	9,582	1.31
20	Confederation	Karina Bosak	Confederation	Independent	21,217	2.90
20	Civic Coalition	Jan Grabiec	Civic Coalition	Civic Coalition	71,534	9.79
20	Civic Coalition	Kinga Gajewska	Civic Coalition	Civic Coalition	85,283	11.67
20	Civic Coalition	Maciej Lasek	Civic Coalition	Civic Coalition	20,565	2.81
20	Civic Coalition	Piotr Kandyba	Civic Coalition	Civic Coalition	15,144	2.07
21	Third Way	Adam Gomoła	Poland 2050	Poland 2050	21,923	4.57
21	The Left	Marcelina Zawisza	Razem	Razem	19,388	4.04
21	Law and Justice	Paweł Kukiz	Direct Democracy	Kukiz'15	43,292	9.02
21	Law and Justice	Marcin Ociepa	Law and Justice	Independent	40,418	8.42
21	Law and Justice	Katarzyna Czochara	Law and Justice	Law and Justice	20,004	4.17
21	Law and Justice	Janusz Kowalski	Non-affiliated	Independent	14,593	3.04
21	Confederation	Włodzimierz Skalik	KKP	KKP	15,190	3.16
21	Civic Coalition	Tomasz Siemoniak	Civic Coalition	Civic Coalition	46,223	9.63
21	Civic Coalition	Witold Zembaczyński	Civic Coalition	Civic Coalition	23,647	4.93
21	Civic Coalition	Tomasz Kostuś	Civic Coalition	Civic Coalition	11,857	2.47
21	Civic Coalition	Rajmund Miller (Note: Died 26 March 2024.)	Civic Coalition	Civic Platform	11,835	2.47
21	Civic Coalition	Danuta Jazłowiecka	Civic Coalition	Civic Coalition	11,580	2.41
21	Civic Coalition	Paweł Masełko (Note: Replaced Rajmund Miller. Sworn in on 8 May 2024.)	Civic Coalition	Civic Coalition	8,322	1.73
22	Third Way	Bartosz Romowicz	Poland 2050	Poland 2050	21,527	4.87
22	Law and Justice	Marek Kuchciński	Law and Justice	Law and Justice	50,519	11.43
22	Law and Justice	Anna Schmidt	Law and Justice	Law and Justice	28,692	6.49
22	Law and Justice	Piotr Uruski	Law and Justice	Law and Justice	22,703	5.14
22	Law and Justice	Piotr Babinetz	Law and Justice	Law and Justice	12,829	2.90
22	Law and Justice	Teresa Pamuła	Law and Justice	Law and Justice	15,273	3.46
22	Law and Justice	Tadeusz Chrzan	Law and Justice	Law and Justice	12,184	2.76
22	Law and Justice	Maria Kurowska	Law and Justice	Law and Justice	20,813	4.71
22	Confederation	Andrzej Zapałowski	Confederation	Independent	14,475	3.27
22	Civic Coalition	Joanna Frydrych	Civic Coalition	Civic Coalition	29,681	6.72
22	Civic Coalition	Marek Rząsa	Civic Coalition	Civic Coalition	13,510	3.06
23	Third Way	Adam Dziedzic	Polish People's Party	Polish People's Party	24,304	3.61
23	Third Way	Elżbieta Burkiewicz	Centre Poland	Centre Poland	11,582	1.72
23	Law and Justice	Zbigniew Ziobro	Law and Justice	Law and Justice	74,592	11.07
23	Law and Justice	Krzysztof Sobolewski	Law and Justice	Law and Justice	18,390	2.73
23	Law and Justice	Ewa Leniart	Law and Justice	Law and Justice	38,795	5.76
23	Law and Justice	Rafał Weber	Law and Justice	Law and Justice	31,349	4.65
23	Law and Justice	Jan Warzecha	Law and Justice	Law and Justice	14,023	2.08
23	Law and Justice	Zbigniew Chmielowiec	Law and Justice	Law and Justice	18,574	2.76
23	Law and Justice	Fryderyk Kapinos	Law and Justice	Law and Justice	18,065	2.68
23	Law and Justice	Kazimierz Gołojuch	Law and Justice	Law and Justice	14,216	2.11
23	Law and Justice	Marcin Warchoł	Law and Justice	Law and Justice	26,750	3.97
23	Confederation	Grzegorz Braun	Confederation	Polish Crown	26,895	3.99
23	Confederation	Michał Połuboczek (Note: Replaced Grzegorz Braun. Sworn in on 26 June 2024.)	Confederation	New Hope	6,287	0.93
23	Civic Coalition	Paweł Kowal	Civic Coalition	Independent	63,534	9.43
23	Civic Coalition	Krystyna Skowrońska	Civic Coalition	Civic Coalition	14,901	2.21
23	Civic Coalition	Zdzisław Gawlik	Civic Coalition	Civic Coalition	7,054	1.05
24	Third Way	Szymon Hołownia	Poland 2050	Poland 2050	79,951	13.12
24	Third Way	Stefan Krajewski	Polish People's Party	Polish People's Party	9,803	1.61
24	Third Way	Barbara Okuła	Centre Poland	Centre Poland	3,482	0.57
24	Law and Justice	Jacek Sasin	Law and Justice	Law and Justice	59,490	9.76
24	Law and Justice	Adam Andruszkiewicz	Law and Justice	Law and Justice	53,632	8.80
24	Law and Justice	Dariusz Piontkowski	Law and Justice	Law and Justice	22,147	3.64
24	Law and Justice	Jarosław Zieliński	Law and Justice	Law and Justice	20,812	3.42
24	Law and Justice	Jacek Bogucki	Law and Justice	Law and Justice	12,032	1.97
24	Law and Justice	Kazimierz Gwiazdowski	Law and Justice	Law and Justice	11,898	1.95
24	Law and Justice	Sebastian Łukaszewicz	Law and Justice	Law and Justice	11,554	1.90
24	Law and Justice	Bogumiła Olbryś (Note: Replaced Adam Andruszkiewicz. Sworn in on 9 September 2025.)	Law and Justice	Law and Justice	10,661	1.75
24	Confederation	Krzysztof Bosak	Confederation	National Movement	44,902	7.37
24	Civic Coalition	Krzysztof Truskolaski	Civic Coalition	Civic Coalition	57,664	9.46
24	Civic Coalition	Alicja Łepkowska-Gołaś	Civic Coalition	Civic Coalition	13,511	2.22
24	Civic Coalition	Jacek Niedźwiedzki	Civic Coalition	Civic Coalition	9,063	1.49
25	Third Way	Agnieszka Buczyńska	Poland 2050	Poland 2050	35,213	5.71
25	Third Way	Magdalena Sroka	Polish People's Party	Polish People's Party	18,348	2.98
25	The Left	Katarzyna Kotula	The Left	New Left	33,122	5.37
25	Law and Justice	Kacper Płażyński	Law and Justice	Law and Justice	100,445	16.30
25	Law and Justice	Kazimierz Smoliński	Law and Justice	Law and Justice	16,177	2.62
25	Law and Justice	Jarosław Sellin	Law and Justice	Law and Justice	7,284	1.18
25	Civic Coalition	Agnieszka Pomaska	Civic Coalition	Civic Coalition	83,590	13.56
25	Civic Coalition	Jacek Karnowski	Civic Coalition	Independent	55,069	8.94
25	Civic Coalition	Magdalena Kołodziejczak	Civic Coalition	Civic Coalition	12,773	2.07
25	Civic Coalition	Piotr Adamowicz	Civic Coalition	Independent	23,147	3.76
25	Civic Coalition	Patryk Gabriel	Civic Coalition	Civic Coalition	11,201	1.82
25	Civic Coalition	Jarosław Wałęsa	Civic Coalition	Civic Coalition	17,408	2.82
26	Third Way	Marek Biernacki	Polish People's Party	Independent	34,369	5.03
26	Third Way	Wioleta Tomczak	Poland 2050	Poland 2050	13,217	1.94
26	The Left	Agnieszka Dziemianowicz-Bąk	The Left	New Left	30,631	4.49
26	Law and Justice	Piotr Müller	Law and Justice	Law and Justice	72,813	10.66
26	Law and Justice	Aleksander Mrówczyński	Law and Justice	Law and Justice	15,125	2.21
26	Law and Justice	Dorota Arciszewska-Mielewczyk	Law and Justice	Law and Justice	11,766	1.72
26	Law and Justice	Marcin Horała	Law and Justice	Law and Justice	47,974	7.03
26	Law and Justice	Michał Kowalski (Note: Replaced Piotr Müller. Sworn in on 26 June 2024.)	Law and Justice	Law and Justice	6,486	0.95
26	Confederation	Stanisław Tyszka	Confederation	New Hope	19,753	2.89
26	Confederation	Krzysztof Szymański (Note: Replaced Stanisław Tyszka. Sworn in on 26 June 2024.)	Confederation	National Movement	6,379	0.93
26	Civic Coalition	Barbara Nowacka	Civic Coalition	Civic Coalition	139,524	20.43
26	Civic Coalition	Zbigniew Konwiński	Civic Coalition	Civic Coalition	15,538	2.28
26	Civic Coalition	Henryka Krzywonos-Strycharska	Civic Coalition	Civic Coalition	8,460	1.24
26	Civic Coalition	Kazimierz Plocke	Civic Coalition	Civic Coalition	8,154	1.19
26	Civic Coalition	Stanisław Lamczyk	Civic Coalition	Civic Coalition	8,722	1.28
26	Civic Coalition	Rafał Siemaszko	Civic Coalition	Independent	15,494	2.27
27	Third Way	Mirosław Suchoń	Centre Poland	Centre Poland	30,897	6.94
27	Law and Justice	Stanisław Szwed	Law and Justice	Law and Justice	57,055	12.81
27	Law and Justice	Grzegorz Puda	Law and Justice	Law and Justice	33,728	7.57
27	Law and Justice	Przemysław Drabek	Law and Justice	Law and Justice	17,886	4.02
27	Law and Justice	Grzegorz Gaża	Law and Justice	Law and Justice	11,940	2.68
27	Confederation	Bronisław Foltyn	Confederation	New Hope	18,134	4.07
27	Civic Coalition	Mirosława Nykiel	Civic Coalition	Civic Platform	49,436	11.10
27	Civic Coalition	Małgorzata Pępek	Civic Coalition	Civic Coalition	22,184	4.98
27	Civic Coalition	Apoloniusz Tajner	Civic Coalition	Independent	20,748	4.66
27	Civic Coalition	Maciej Tomczykiewicz (Note: Replaced Mirosława Nykiel. Sworn in on 26 June 2024.)	Civic Coalition	Civic Coalition	12,153	2.73
28	Third Way	Henryk Kiepura	Polish People's Party	Polish People's Party	20,665	6.38
28	Law and Justice	Lidia Burzyńska	Law and Justice	Law and Justice	49,713	15.35
28	Law and Justice	Szymon Giżyński	Law and Justice	Law and Justice	14,148	4.37
28	Law and Justice	Andrzej Gawron	Law and Justice	Law and Justice	13,239	4.09
28	Civic Coalition	Izabela Leszczyna	Civic Coalition	Civic Coalition	60,549	18.69
28	Civic Coalition	Andrzej Szewiński	Civic Coalition	Civic Coalition	10,171	3.14
28	Civic Coalition	Przemysław Witek	Civic Coalition	Independent	5,121	1.58
29	Third Way	Piotr Strach	Poland 2050	Poland 2050	17,634	4.55
29	The Left	Wanda Nowicka	The Left	New Left	16,882	4.36
29	Law and Justice	Bożena Borys-Szopa	Law and Justice	Law and Justice	30,445	7.86
29	Law and Justice	Jarosław Wieczorek	Law and Justice	Law and Justice	23,451	6.05
29	Law and Justice	Wojciech Szarama	Law and Justice	Law and Justice	12,185	3.15
29	Civic Coalition	Krystyna Szumilas	Civic Coalition	Civic Coalition	50,871	13.13
29	Civic Coalition	Marek Gzik	Civic Coalition	Civic Coalition	19,070	4.92
29	Civic Coalition	Marta Golbik	Civic Coalition	Civic Coalition	19,430	5.02
29	Civic Coalition	Tomasz Głogowski	Civic Coalition	Civic Coalition	11,463	2.96
30	Third Way	Łukasz Osmalak	Poland 2050	Poland 2050	19,616	5.14
30	Law and Justice	Bolesław Piecha	Law and Justice	Law and Justice	32,427	8.50
30	Law and Justice	Paweł Jabłoński	Law and Justice	Law and Justice	22,996	6.03
30	Law and Justice	Michał Woś	Law and Justice	Law and Justice	39,902	10.46
30	Law and Justice	Grzegorz Matusiak	Law and Justice	Law and Justice	12,690	3.33
30	Confederation	Roman Fritz	KKP	KKP	11,089	2.91
30	Civic Coalition	Krzysztof Gadowski	Civic Coalition	Civic Coalition	36,031	9.44
30	Civic Coalition	Gabriela Lenartowicz	Civic Coalition	Civic Coalition	16,515	4.33
30	Civic Coalition	Marek Krząkała	Civic Coalition	Civic Coalition	18,605	4.88
31	Third Way	Michał Gramatyka	Poland 2050	Poland 2050	32,251	6.13
31	The Left	Maciej Konieczny	Razem	Razem	17,901	3.40
31	Law and Justice	Mateusz Morawiecki	Law and Justice	Law and Justice	117,064	22.25
31	Law and Justice	Michał Wójcik	Law and Justice	Law and Justice	8,270	1.57
31	Law and Justice	Marek Wesoły	Law and Justice	Law and Justice	9,915	1.88
31	Law and Justice	Jerzy Polaczek	Law and Justice	Law and Justice	5,996	1.14
31	Confederation	Grzegorz Płaczek	Confederation	New Hope	18,648	3.54
31	Civic Coalition	Borys Budka	Civic Coalition	Civic Platform	101,258	19.24
31	Civic Coalition	Monika Rosa	Civic Coalition	Civic Coalition	44,857	8.53
31	Civic Coalition	Wojciech Król	Civic Coalition	Civic Coalition	7,136	1.36
31	Civic Coalition	Ewa Kołodziej	Civic Coalition	Civic Coalition	7,283	1.38
31	Civic Coalition	Łukasz Ściebiorowski	Civic Coalition	Independent	7,116	1.35
31	Civic Coalition	Urszula Koszutska (Note: Replaced Borys Budka. Sworn in on 26 June 2024.)	Civic Coalition	Civic Coalition	6,498	1.23
32	Third Way	Kamil Wnuk	Poland 2050	Poland 2050	16,310	4.32
32	The Left	Włodzimierz Czarzasty	The Left	New Left	22,332	5.91
32	The Left	Łukasz Litewka (Note: Died 23 April 2026.)	The Left	New Left	40,579	10.74
32	The Left	Bożena Borowiec (Note: Replaced Łukasz Litewka. Sworn in on 15 May 2026.)	The Left	New Left	4,937	1.31
32	Law and Justice	Ewa Malik	Law and Justice	Law and Justice	39,498	10.45
32	Law and Justice	Waldemar Andzel	Law and Justice	Law and Justice	22,699	6.01
32	Law and Justice	Robert Warwas	Law and Justice	Law and Justice	17,403	4.60
32	Civic Coalition	Wojciech Saługa (Note: Member until 6 May 2024. Elected marshal of the Silesian Voivodeship.)	Civic Coalition	Civic Platform	28,781	7.61
32	Civic Coalition	Barbara Dolniak	Civic Coalition	Civic Coalition	37,470	9.91
32	Civic Coalition	Mateusz Bochenek	Civic Coalition	Civic Coalition	15,117	4.00
32	Civic Coalition	Katarzyna Stachowicz (Note: Replaced Wojciech Saługa. Sworn in on 22 May 2024.)	Civic Coalition	Civic Platform	10,060	2.66
33	Third Way	Czesław Siekierski	Polish People's Party	Polish People's Party	21,916	3.32
33	Third Way	Rafał Kasprzyk	Centre Poland	Centre Poland	10,907	1.65
33	The Left	Andrzej Szejna	The Left	New Left	17,961	2.72
33	Law and Justice	Jarosław Kaczyński	Law and Justice	Law and Justice	177,228	26.89
33	Law and Justice	Anna Krupka	Law and Justice	Law and Justice	39,854	6.05
33	Law and Justice	Krzysztof Lipiec	Law and Justice	Law and Justice	14,962	2.27
33	Law and Justice	Agata Wojtyszek	Law and Justice	Law and Justice	15,405	2.34
33	Law and Justice	Andrzej Kryj	Law and Justice	Law and Justice	6,968	1.06
33	Law and Justice	Michał Cieślak	Law and Justice	Law and Justice	5,629	0.85
33	Law and Justice	Mariusz Gosek	Law and Justice	Law and Justice	5,309	0.81
33	Law and Justice	Bartłomiej Dorywalski	Law and Justice	Law and Justice	9,696	1.47
33	Confederation	Michał Wawer	Confederation	National Movement	18,300	2.78
33	Civic Coalition	Marzena Okła-Drewnowicz	Civic Coalition	Civic Coalition	64,990	9.86
33	Civic Coalition	Artur Gierada	Civic Coalition	Civic Coalition	16,878	2.56
33	Civic Coalition	Lucjan Pietrzczyk	Civic Coalition	Civic Coalition	5,826	0.88
33	Civic Coalition	Roman Giertych	Civic Coalition	Independent	23,622	3.58
34	Third Way	Zbigniew Ziejewski	Polish People's Party	Polish People's Party	12,695	4.24
34	Law and Justice	Leonard Krasulski	Law and Justice	Law and Justice	13,948	4.66
34	Law and Justice	Teresa Wilk	Law and Justice	Law and Justice	9,280	3.10
34	Law and Justice	Andrzej Śliwka	Law and Justice	Law and Justice	32,895	10.99
34	Law and Justice	Robert Gontarz	Law and Justice	Law and Justice	24,940	8.33
34	Civic Coalition	Jacek Protas	Civic Coalition	Civic Platform	35,745	11.94
34	Civic Coalition	Elżbieta Gelert	Civic Coalition	Civic Coalition	15,847	5.29
34	Civic Coalition	Stanisław Gorczyca	Civic Coalition	Independent	7,979	2.67
34	Civic Coalition	Katarzyna Królak (Note: Replaced Jacek Protas. Sworn in on 26 June 2024.)	Civic Coalition	Civic Coalition	5,979	2.00
35	Third Way	Urszula Pasławska	Polish People's Party	Polish People's Party	26,992	6.90
35	The Left	Marcin Kulasek	The Left	New Left	11,514	2.94
35	Law and Justice	Janusz Cieszyński	Law and Justice	Law and Justice	20,644	5.28
35	Law and Justice	Artur Chojecki	Law and Justice	Law and Justice	17,418	4.45
35	Law and Justice	Iwona Arent	Law and Justice	Law and Justice	16,675	4.26
35	Law and Justice	Olga Semeniuk-Patkowska	Law and Justice	Law and Justice	14,183	3.63
35	Civic Coalition	Janusz Cichoń	Civic Coalition	Civic Coalition	32,356	8.27
35	Civic Coalition	Anna Wojciechowska	Civic Coalition	Civic Coalition	18,828	4.81
35	Civic Coalition	Paweł Papke	Civic Coalition	Civic Coalition	27,023	6.91
35	Civic Coalition	Maciej Wróbel	Civic Coalition	Civic Coalition	9,837	2.52
36	Third Way	Andrzej Grzyb	Polish People's Party	Polish People's Party	29,391	5.42
36	Third Way	Barbara Oliwiecka	Centre Poland	Centre Poland	12,214	2.25
36	The Left	Wiesław Szczepański	The Left	New Left	13,668	2.52
36	Law and Justice	Marlena Maląg	Law and Justice	Law and Justice	109,870	20.26
36	Law and Justice	Katarzyna Sójka	Law and Justice	Law and Justice	18,138	3.34
36	Law and Justice	Jan Dziedziczak	Law and Justice	Law and Justice	14,689	2.71
36	Law and Justice	Jan Mosiński	Law and Justice	Law and Justice	7,321	1.35
36	Law and Justice	Piotr Kaleta	Law and Justice	Law and Justice	16,344	3.01
36	Law and Justice	Lidia Czechak (Note: Replaced Marlena Maląg. Sworn in on 26 June 2024.)	Law and Justice	Law and Justice	7,053	1.30
36	Civic Coalition	Jarosław Urbaniak	Civic Coalition	Civic Coalition	50,724	9.35
36	Civic Coalition	Karolina Pawliczak	Civic Coalition	Independent	21,819	4.02
36	Civic Coalition	Grzegorz Rusiecki (Note: Member until 10 April 2024. Elected mayor of Leszno.)	Civic Coalition	Civic Platform	22,410	4.13
36	Civic Coalition	Mariusz Witczak	Civic Coalition	Civic Coalition	12,754	2.35
36	Civic Coalition	Alicja Łuczak (Note: Replaced Grzegorz Rusiecki. Sworn in on 26 April 2024.)	Civic Coalition	Civic Coalition	5,186	0.96
37	Third Way	Paulina Hennig-Kloska	Centre Poland	Centre Poland	30,334	7.24
37	Third Way	Michał Pyrzyk	Polish People's Party	Polish People's Party	10,304	2.46
37	The Left	Tadeusz Tomaszewski	The Left	New Left	17,181	4.10
37	Law and Justice	Zbigniew Hoffmann	Law and Justice	Law and Justice	47,594	11.35
37	Law and Justice	Witold Czarnecki	Law and Justice	Law and Justice	17,601	4.20
37	Law and Justice	Zbigniew Dolata	Law and Justice	Law and Justice	25,663	6.12
37	Law and Justice	Ryszard Bartosik	Law and Justice	Law and Justice	25,371	6.05
37	Civic Coalition	Michał Kołodziejczak	Civic Coalition	AGROunia	44,062	10.51
37	Civic Coalition	Tomasz Nowak	Civic Coalition	Civic Coalition	15,495	3.70
38	Third Way	Krzysztof Paszyk	Polish People's Party	Polish People's Party	27,642	6.69
38	Third Way	Adam Luboński	Poland 2050	Poland 2050	8,724	2.11
38	Law and Justice	Krzysztof Czarnecki	Law and Justice	Law and Justice	37,420	9.06
38	Law and Justice	Grzegorz Piechowiak	Law and Justice	Independent	13,122	3.18
38	Law and Justice	Marcin Porzucek	Law and Justice	Law and Justice	28,293	6.85
38	Civic Coalition	Jakub Rutnicki	Civic Coalition	Civic Coalition	67,069	16.23
38	Civic Coalition	Maria Janyska	Civic Coalition	Civic Coalition	23,592	5.71
38	Civic Coalition	Piotr Głowski	Civic Coalition	Civic Coalition	16,067	3.89
38	Civic Coalition	Henryk Szopiński	Civic Coalition	Civic Coalition	8,263	2.00
39	Third Way	Ewa Schädler	Poland 2050	Poland 2050	33,815	5.67
39	Third Way	Jacek Tomczak	Polish People's Party	Centre for Poland	24,918	4.18
39	The Left	Katarzyna Ueberhan	The Left	New Left	24,485	4.11
39	Law and Justice	Szymon Szynkowski vel Sęk	Law and Justice	Law and Justice	45,167	7.58
39	Law and Justice	Bartłomiej Wróblewski	Law and Justice	Law and Justice	28,860	4.84
39	Civic Coalition	Adam Szłapka	Civic Coalition	Civic Coalition	149,064	25.01
39	Civic Coalition	Katarzyna Kierzek-Koperska	Civic Coalition	Civic Coalition	20,091	3.37
39	Civic Coalition	Marcin Bosacki	Civic Coalition	Civic Coalition	24,197	4.06
39	Civic Coalition	Bartosz Zawieja	Civic Coalition	Civic Coalition	9,103	1.53
39	Civic Coalition	Franciszek Sterczewski	Civic Coalition	Independent	10,108	1.70
40	Third Way	Radosław Lubczyk	Polish People's Party	Centre for Poland	14,353	4.46
40	Law and Justice	Czesław Hoc	Law and Justice	Law and Justice	31,360	9.73
40	Law and Justice	Paweł Szefernaker (Note: Member until 7 August 2025. Appointed cabinet chief of the presidential chancellery.)	Law and Justice	Law and Justice	29,764	9.24
40	Law and Justice	Małgorzata Golińska	Law and Justice	Law and Justice	15,253	4.73
40	Law and Justice	Marek Subocz (Note: Replaced Paweł Sefernaker. Sworn in on 9 September 2025.)	Law and Justice	Law and Justice	7,511	2.33
40	Civic Coalition	Bartosz Arłukowicz	Civic Coalition	Civic Platform	67,325	20.90
40	Civic Coalition	Marek Hok	Civic Coalition	Civic Coalition	8,176	2.54
40	Civic Coalition	Renata Rak	Civic Coalition	Independent	9,170	2.85
40	Civic Coalition	Paweł Suski	Civic Coalition	Civic Coalition	5,934	1.84
40	Civic Coalition	Barbara Grygorcewicz (Note: Replaced Bartosz Arłukowicz. Sworn in on 28 June 2024.)	Civic Coalition	Civic Coalition	5,700	1.77
41	Third Way	Jarosław Rzepa	Polish People's Party	Polish People's Party	21,309	3.84
41	The Left	Dariusz Wieczorek	The Left	New Left	15,378	2.77
41	Law and Justice	Marek Gróbarczyk	Law and Justice	Law and Justice	44,422	8.01
41	Law and Justice	Artur Szałabawka	Law and Justice	Law and Justice	15,446	2.79
41	Law and Justice	Zbigniew Bogucki (Note: Member until 7 August 2025. Appointed chief of the presidential chancellery.)	Law and Justice	Law and Justice	26,375	4.76
41	Law and Justice	Dariusz Matecki	Law and Justice	Law and Justice	14,974	2.70
41	Law and Justice	Michał Jach (Note: Replaced Zbigniew Bogucki. Sworn in on 9 September 2025.)	Law and Justice	Law and Justice	12,480	2.25
41	Civic Coalition	Sławomir Nitras	Civic Coalition	Civic Coalition	90,720	16.37
41	Civic Coalition	Magdalena Filiks	Civic Coalition	Civic Coalition	40,772	7.36
41	Civic Coalition	Arkadiusz Marchewka	Civic Coalition	Civic Coalition	33,222	5.99
41	Civic Coalition	Artur Łącki	Civic Coalition	Civic Coalition	6,100	1.10
41	Civic Coalition	Grzegorz Napieralski	Civic Coalition	Independent	7,239	1.31
41	Civic Coalition	Patryk Jaskulski	Civic Coalition	Civic Coalition	7,439	1.34
