= Sejm Constituency no. 38 =

Polish parliamentary constituency

Piła
- Constituency for the Sejm
- Location of Piła within Poland
- Counties: Chodzież County; Czarnków-Trzcianka County; Grodzisk County; Międzychód County; Nowy Tomyśl County; Oborniki County; Piła County; Szamotuły County; Wągrowiec County; Wolsztyn County; Złotów County
- Voivodeship: Greater Poland
- Population: 746,870 (2022)
- Electorate: 586,375 (2023)

Current Constituency
- Created: 2001
- Seats: 9
- Deputies: List: Waldemar Andzel (PiS); Mateusz Bochenek (PO-KO); Włodzimierz Czarzasty (The Left); Barbara Dolniak (PO-KO); Łukasz Litewka (The Left); Ewa Malik (PiS); Kamil Wnuk (Poland 2050); Katarzyna Stachowicz (PO-KO); Robert Warwas (PiS)
- Regional assembly: Greater Poland Voivodeship Sejmik
- Senate constituencies: 88 and 89
- EP constituency: 7 – Greater Poland

Piła, officially known as Constituency no. 38 (Polish: Okręg wyborczy nr 38), is one of the 41 constituencies of the Sejm, the lower house of the Parliament of Poland, the national legislature of Poland. The constituency was established in 2001, after a major redistricting process across Poland. It is located in the Greater Poland Voivodeship and includes the area of the following counties: Chodzież, Czarnków-Trzcianka, Grodzisk, Międzychód, Nowy Tomyśl, Oborniki, Piła, Szamotuły, Wągrowiec, Wolsztyn and Złotów. The constituency's district electoral commission is located in Piła. The constituency currently elects 9 of the 460 members of the Sejm using the open party-list proportional representation electoral system. At the 2023 parliamentary election it had 586,375 citizens eligible to vote.

== List of deputies ==
Deputies for the 10th Sejm (2023–2027)
Deputy	Party	Parliamentary group
Piotr Głowski	Civic Platform	Civic Coalition
Maria Janyska	Civic Platform	Civic Coalition
Jakub Rutnicki	Civic Platform	Civic Coalition
Henryk Szopiński	Civic Platform	Civic Coalition
Krzysztof Czarnecki	Law and Justice	United Right
Grzegorz Piechowiak	Law and Justice	United Right
Marcin Porzucek	Law and Justice	United Right
Krzysztof Paszyk	Polish People's Party	Polish People's Party
Adam Luboński	Poland 2050	Poland 2050

== Election results ==
=== 2001 ===
2001 parliamentary election: Piła
Party	Votes	%	Seats
Democratic Left Alliance – Labour Union	124,244	48.34	5
Self-Defence of the Republic of Poland	30,163	11.74	1
Polish People's Party	27,118	10.55	1
Civic Platform	26,901	10.47	1
League of Polish Families	17,057	6.64	1
Law and Justice	11,869	4.62	–
Solidarity of the Right Electoral Action	11,686	4.55	–
Freedom Union	6,885	2.68	–
Alternative Social Movement	1,105	0.43	–
Total	257,028	100.00	9
Valid votes	257,028	92.74	
Invalid/blank votes	20,133	7.26	
Total votes	277,161	100.00	
Registered voters/turnout	564,203	49.12	
Source: National Electoral Commission

=== 2005 ===
2005 parliamentary election: Piła
Party	Votes	%	Seats
Civic Platform	54,063	24.71	3
Law and Justice	37,036	16.93	2
Democratic Left Alliance	34,622	15.82	2
Self-Defence of the Republic of Poland	32,272	14.75	1
Polish People's Party	21,111	9.65	1
League of Polish Families	16,271	7.44	–
Social Democracy of Poland	12,785	5.84	–
Democratic Party – demokraci.pl	3,294	1.51	–
Liberty and Lawfulness	2,948	1.35	–
Patriotic Movement	1,994	0.91	–
Polish Labour Party	1,716	0.78	–
Polish National Party	681	0.31	–
Total	218,793	100.00	9
Valid votes	218,793	93.94	
Invalid/blank votes	14,123	6.06	
Total votes	232,916	100.00	
Registered voters/turnout	589,216	39.53	
Source: National Electoral Commission

=== 2007 ===
2007 parliamentary election: Piła
Party	Votes	%	Seats
Civic Platform	125,036	41.88	4
Law and Justice	64,870	21.73	2
Left and Democrats	58,960	19.75	2
Polish People's Party	37,706	12.63	1
Self-Defence of the Republic of Poland	6,352	2.13	–
League of Polish Families	2,889	0.97	–
Polish Labour Party	2,756	0.92	–
Total	298,569	100.00	9
Valid votes	298,569	96.70	
Invalid/blank votes	10,182	3.30	
Total votes	308,751	100.00	
Registered voters/turnout	596,237	51.78	
Source: National Electoral Commission

=== 2011 ===
2011 parliamentary election: Piła
Party	Votes	%	Seats
Civic Platform	113,226	43.56	4
Law and Justice	50,023	19.24	2
Polish People's Party	31,192	12.00	1
Democratic Left Alliance	29,638	11.40	1
Palikot's Movement	28,633	11.01	1
Poland Comes First	5,440	2.09	–
Right Wing	1,801	0.69	–
Total	259,953	100.00	9
Valid votes	259,953	93.26	
Invalid/blank votes	18,774	6.74	
Total votes	278,727	100.00	
Registered voters/turnout	609,423	45.74	
Source: National Electoral Commission

=== 2015 ===
2015 parliamentary election: Piła
Party	Votes	%	Seats
Civic Platform	83,845	31.02	4
Law and Justice	73,665	27.26	3
United Left	24,723	9.15	–
Kukiz'15	24,359	9.01	1
Polish People's Party	20,712	7.66	1
Modern	18,859	6.98	–
KORWiN	11,004	4.07	–
Together	10,591	3.92	–
Stonoga Polish Party	2,515	0.93	–
Total	270,273	100.00	9
Valid votes	270,273	96.06	
Invalid/blank votes	11,098	3.94	
Total votes	281,371	100.00	
Registered voters/turnout	610,758	46.07	
Source: National Electoral Commission

=== 2019 ===
2019 parliamentary election: Piła
Party	Votes	%	Seats
Law and Justice	124,392	35.64	4
Civic Coalition	106,810	30.60	3
The Left	48,371	13.86	1
Polish People's Party	46,355	13.28	1
Confederation Liberty and Independence	23,123	6.62	–
Total	349,051	100.00	9
Valid votes	349,051	98.24	
Invalid/blank votes	6,270	1.76	
Total votes	355,321	100.00	
Registered voters/turnout	601,148	59.11	
Source: National Electoral Commission

=== 2023 ===
2023 parliamentary election: Piła
Party	Votes	%	Seats
Civic Coalition	144,114	34.87	4
Law and Justice	120,301	29.11	3
Third Way	72,996	17.66	2
The Left	32,378	7.84	–
Confederation Liberty and Independence	28,370	6.87	–
Nonpartisan Local Government Activists	7,878	1.91	–
There is One Poland	7,198	1.74	–
Total	413,235	100.00	9
Valid votes	413,235	97.21	
Invalid/blank votes	11,879	2.79	
Total votes	425,114	100.00	
Registered voters/turnout	581,291	73.13	
Source: National Electoral Commission
