= Elżbieta Gapińska =

Polish politician, schoolteacher, and lecturer (born 1960)

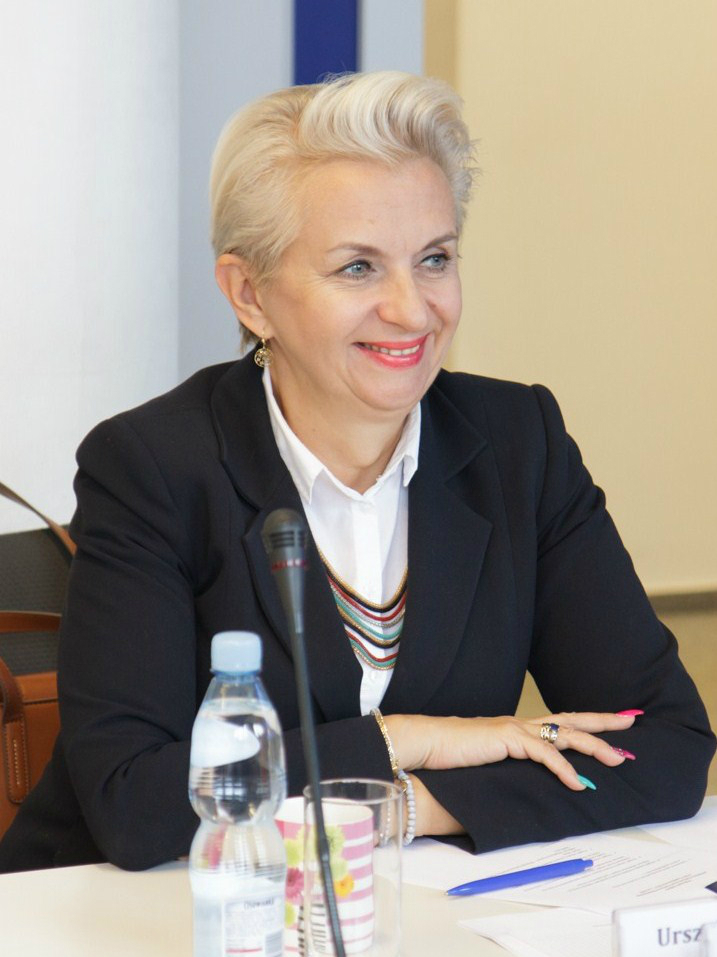
- Gapińska in 2017.

Member of the Sejm of Poland
- Incumbent
- Assumed office 8 November 2011
- Constituency: No. 16

Chairperson of the Płock City Council
- In office 8 December 2010 – 9 October 2011
- Preceded by: Tomasz Korga
- Succeeded by: Artur Jaroszewski

Member of the Płock City Council
- In office 27 November 2006 – 9 October 2011
- Constituency: No. 2

Personal details
- Born: Elżbieta Teresa Karowska; 3 October 1960 (age 66) Płock, Poland
- Party: Civic Coalition (since 2025)
- Other political affiliations: Civic Platform (until 2025)
- Occupation: Politician, schoolteacher, lecturer

Elżbieta Teresa Gapińska (Polish: [ɛlʐˈbjɛ.ta tɛˈrɛ.sa ɡaˈpiɲ.ska]; née Karowska, Polish: [kaˈrɔf.ska]; born 3 October 1960) is a Polish politician, schoolteacher, and lecturer. Since 2011, she is a member of the Sejm of Poland, representing the constituency no. 16, consisting of the north-eastern portion of Masovian Voivodeship. Previously, Gapińska was a member of the city council in Płock, Poland, from 2006 to 2011, and its chairperson from 2010 to 2011. She belongs to the Civic Coalition, and previously, until 2025, she was a member of the Civic Platform. Prior to her political career, Gapińska was a schoolteacher and a lecturer in Płock.

== Biography ==
Elżbieta Gapińska (née Karowska) was born on 3 October 1960 in the city of Płock, located in Masovian Voivodeship, Poland. Gapińska finished the Marshal Stanisław Małachowski General Education Secondary School in Płock, and in 1985, she graduated from the Maria Grzegorzewska Academy of Special Education in Warsaw with a master's degree in special education, specialised in the resocialisation. She was a lecturer at the Higher Vocational School, and a post-graduate school for teachers in Płock, and edited and created educational publications for teachers. Later, Gapińska was a schoolteacher in a intermediate school in Płock.

In 2001, Gapińska joined the Civic Platform party, and participated in the organisation its local structures in Płock. She was elected to the city council in 2006 and 2010, serving until 2011. Gapińska run from the constituency no. 2, and received 357 (2.99%), and 1,312 (10.23%) votes. She was the chairperson of the city council from 2010. In 2009, Gapińska unsuccessfully run for a seat in the European Parliament, from the constituency no. 5, consisting of Masovian Voivodeship, barring the Warsaw metropolitan area. She received 6,321 votes (5.54%). In 2011, Gapińska was elected to the Sejm of Poland from the constituency no. 16, consisting of the north-eastern portion of Masovian Voivodeship. She received 10,794 votes (3.90%). Gapińska was re-elected in 2015, 2019, and 2023, receiving 11,733 (3.91%), 10,905 (2.94%), and 13,214 (2.99%) votes, respectively. In 2025, the Civic Platform merged into the Civic Coalition. In the Sejm, she is the deputy chairperson of the Education and Science Committee, and has been a member of the Petition Affairs Committee, and the Culture, National Heritage and Mass Media Committee.

On 9 Match 2023, Gapińska because a member and the chairperson of the Płock Council of Women, an organisation created by the mayor of Płock, tasked with analysing the needs and situation of women in the city, promoting equal opportunities, supporting women's initiatives, and providing counsel to the mayor.

== Personal life ==
Gapińska has a husband and three children. She resides in the city of Płock in Masovian Voivodeship, Poland.

== Awards and decorations ==
- Bronze Cross of Merit (2001)

== Electoral results ==
Electoral history of Anna Maria Żukowska
Year	Office		Party	Constituency	Votes			Result	Ref.
Year	Office		Party	Constituency	Total	%	P.	Result	Ref.
2006	Płock City Council	5th	Civic Platform	No. 2	357	2.99	7th	Won	
2010	Płock City Council	6th	Civic Platform	No. 2	1,312	10.23	1st	Won	
2009	European Parliament	7th	Civic Platform	No. 5	6,321	5.54	9th	Lost	
2011	Sejm of Poland	7th	Civic Platform	No. 16	10,794	3.90	5th	Won	
2015	Sejm of Poland	8th	Civic Platform	No. 16	11,733	3.91	6th	Won	
2019	Sejm of Poland	9th	Civic Coalition	No. 16	10,905	2.94	11th	Won	
2023	Sejm of Poland	10th	Civic Coalition	No. 16	13,214	2.99	12th	Won	
