= 10th term Sejm and 11th term Senate of Poland =

Legislature of the Republic of Poland

10th term Sejm & 11th term Senate of the Republic of Poland
←	9th term Sejm and 10th term Senate	11th term Sejm and 12th term Senate	→
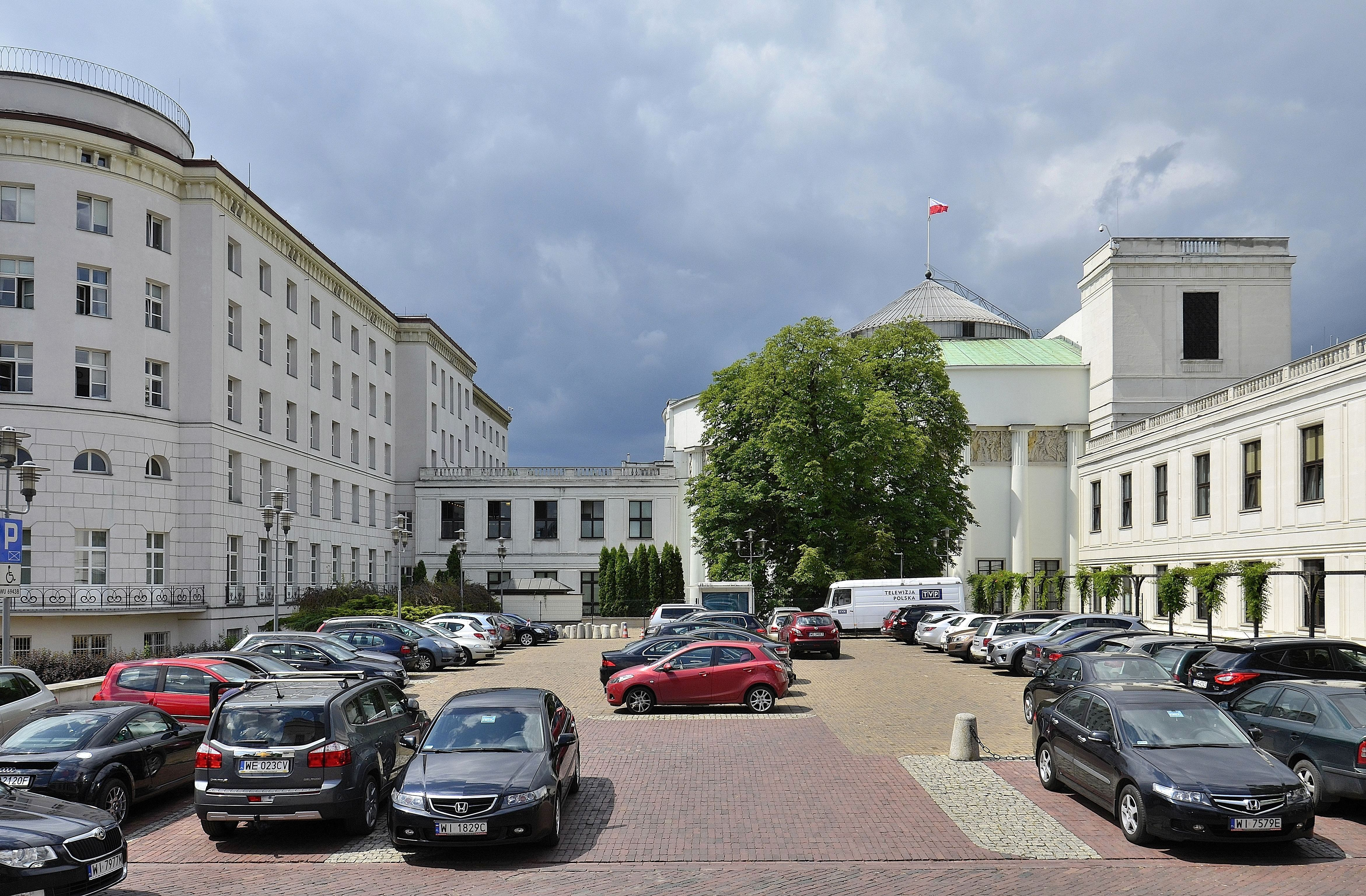
- Sejm and Senate Complex of Poland

Overview
- Legislative body: Parliament of Poland
- Jurisdiction: Poland
- Meeting place: Sejm building complex, Warsaw, Poland
- Term: 13 November 2023 – present
- Election: 15 October 2023
- Government: Tusk III: (Note: Following the election, Mateusz Morawiecki was first designated as Prime Minister by the President Andrzej Duda with a United Right minority government. He took the oath of office for his third term on 27 November 2023. On 11 December 2023, Morawiecki's government was defeated in a motion of confidence vote, 190 against 266, prompting the fall of his government. The same day, Donald Tusk was elected as prime minister appointee by 248 against 201, being confirmed to the post on 13 December.): Civic Coalition; Polish Coalition; Poland 2050; Centre (from 2026); New Left
- Opposition: Law and Justice; Confederation; Razem (from 2024); Direct Democracy; The Crown (from 2025)
- Website: sejm.gov.pl senat.gov.pl

10th term Sejm
- Members: 460 deputies
- Marshal of the Sejm: Włodzimierz Czarzasty, NL
- Deputy Marshals of the Sejm: Dorota Niedziela, KO; Monika Wielichowska, KO; Piotr Zgorzelski, PSL; Szymon Hołownia, PL2050; Krzysztof Bosak, RN vacant, PiS
- Party control: October 15 Coalition

11th term Senate
- Members: 100 Senators
- Marshal of the Senate: Małgorzata Maria Kidawa- Błońska, KO
- Deputy Marshals of the Senate: Rafał Grupiński, P=KO; Magdalena Biejat, Ind; Michał Kamiński, UED; Maciej Żywno, PL2050 vacant, PiS
- Party control: Senate Pact 2023 majority

The 10th term Sejm and the 11th term Senate is the legislature of the Republic of Poland following the 2023 Polish parliamentary election held on 15 October 2023 which returned 460 deputies to the Sejm and 100 senators to the Senate.

The Parliament of Poland held its inaugural meeting on 13 November 2023.

== Current standings ==
Standings in the 10th Sejm and the 11th Senate
Affiliation	Deputies (Sejm)			Senators (Senate)		
Affiliation	Results of the 2023 election	As of 30 July 2026	Change	Results of the 2023 election	As of 30 July 2026	Change
Parliamentary clubs
Law and Justice	194	147	▼47	34	32	▼2
Development Plus	—	40	▲40	—	1	▲1
Civic Coalition	157	156	▼1	41	42	▲1
Polish Coalition	32	32	Steady	11	8	▼3
Poland 2050	33	15	▼18	11	8	▼3
Centre	—	15	▲15	part of Senatorial Club New Poland-Centre		
The Left	26	21	▼5	9	8	▼1
Deputative clubs
Confederation	18	16	▼2	—	—	Steady
Deputative caucuses
Razem	—	4	▲4	—	—	Steady
Direct Democracy	—	4	▲4	—	—	Steady
Confederation of the Polish Crown	—	3	▲3	—	—	Steady
Senatorial clubs
New Poland-Centre	—	—	Steady	—	7	▲7
Independents
Independents	—	7	▲7	5	2	▼3
Total members	460	460	Steady	100	100	Steady
Vacant	—	0	Steady	—	0	Steady
Total seats	460			100		

=== List of Parliamentary clubs and caucuses ===
Parliamentary Group	Chair	Type	# of deputies	# of senators	Status
Civic Coalition	Zbigniew Konwiński (in the Sejm)	Parliamentary club	156	43	Government
Civic Coalition	Tomasz Grodzki (in the Senate)	Parliamentary club	156	43	Government
Law and Justice	Mariusz Błaszczak (in the Sejm)	Parliamentary club	147	32	Opposition
Law and Justice	Stanisław Karczewski (in the Senate)	Parliamentary club	147	32	Opposition
Development Plus	Mateusz Morawiecki (in the Sejm)	Parliamentary club	40	1	Opposition
Development Plus	Włodzimierz Bernacki (in the Senate)	Parliamentary club	40	1	Opposition
Polish People's Party	Krzysztof Paszyk (in the Sejm)	Parliamentary club	32	Third Way	Government
The Left	Anna Maria Żukowska (in the Sejm)	Parliamentary club	21	8	Government
The Left	Waldemar Witkowski (in the Senate)	Parliamentary club	21	8	Government
Confederation	Grzegorz Płaczek	Deputies' club	16	—	Opposition
Centre	Mirosław Suchoń (in the Sejm)	Parliamentary club	15	NEW Poland-Centre	Government
Poland 2050	Paweł Śliz (in the Sejm)	Parliamentary club	15	Third Way	Government
Direct Democracy	Jarosław Sachajko	Deputies' caucus	4	—	Opposition
Razem	Marcelina Zawisza	Deputies' caucus	4	—	Opposition
Confederation of the Polish Crown	Włodzimierz Skalik	Deputies' caucus	3	—	Opposition
Third Way	Waldemar Pawlak (in the Senate)	Senators' club	Polish People's Party and Poland 2050	8	Government
NEW Poland-Centre	Grzegorz Fedorowicz (in the Senate)	Senators' club	Centre	7	Government

=== Distribution of seats for individual parties ===
Parties in the Sejm
Club	Parties	Seats
Law and Justice	Law and Justice	179
Law and Justice	Renewal of the Republic of Poland	6
Law and Justice	Independent	3
Civic Coalition	Civic Coalition	136
Civic Coalition	The Greens	2
Civic Coalition	Yes! For Poland	2
Civic Coalition	AGROunia	1
Civic Coalition	Independent	15
Polish People's Party	Polish People's Party	28
Polish People's Party	Centre for Poland	3
Polish People's Party	Independent	1
Poland 2050	Poland 2050	31
The Left	New Left	18
The Left	Independent	3
Razem	Partia Razem	4
Confederation	New Hope	8
Confederation	National Movement	7
Confederation	Independent	1
Free Republicans	Kukiz'15	3
Free Republicans	Freedom and Prosperity	1
Confederation of the Polish Crown	Confederation of the Polish Crown	3
Independent	Independent	5

Parties in the Senate
Club	Parties	Seats
Civic Coalition	Civic Coalition	36
Civic Coalition	Yes! For Poland	1
Civic Coalition	Independent	6
Law and Justice	Law and Justice	30
Law and Justice	Independent	4
Third Way	Poland 2050	5
Third Way	Polish People's Party	4
Third Way	Centre for Poland	1
Third Way	Union of European Democrats	1
Third Way	Independent	1
The Left	New Left	4
The Left	Independent	2
The Left	Labour Union	1
The Left	Polish Socialist Party	1
New Poland	New Poland	3

== 10th term Sejm ==
=== List of political officers ===
Office	Holder	Party	Since
Marshal of the Sejm	Włodzimierz Czarzasty	New Left	18 November 2025
Deputy Marshals of the Sejm	Dorota Niedziela	Civic Coalition (Note: Civic Platform (PO) until 25 October 2025.)	13 November 2023
Deputy Marshals of the Sejm	Monika Wielichowska	Civic Coalition	13 November 2023
Deputy Marshals of the Sejm	Piotr Zgorzelski	Polish People's Party	13 November 2023
Deputy Marshals of the Sejm	Krzysztof Bosak	National Movement	13 November 2023
Deputy Marshals of the Sejm	Szymon Hołownia	Poland 2050	18 November 2025
Senior Marshal	Marek Sawicki	Polish People's Party	9 November 2023

== 11th term Senate ==
Office	Holder	Party	Since
Marshal of the Senate	Małgorzata Kidawa-Błońska	Civic Coalition	13 November 2023
Deputy Marshals of the Senate	Rafał Grupiński	Civic Coalition	13 November 2023
Deputy Marshals of the Senate	Magdalena Biejat	New Left	13 November 2023
Deputy Marshals of the Senate	Maciej Żywno	Poland 2050	13 November 2023
Deputy Marshals of the Senate	Michał Kamiński	Union of European Democrats	13 November 2023
Senior Marshal	Michał Seweryński	Law and Justice	9 November 2023

== Governments ==
Portrait	Name Sejm District (Birth–Death)	Tenure			Party	Government
Portrait	Name Sejm District (Birth–Death)	Took office	Left office	Duration	Party	Government
	Mateusz Morawiecki; Katowice II - 31 (born 1968)	27 November 2023	13 December 2023 (no confidence vote)	17 days	Law and Justice	Morawiecki III
	Donald Tusk; Warsaw - 19 (born 1957)	13 December 2023	Incumbent	2 years, 230 days	Civic Coalition	Tusk III (KO–PSL–PL2050–NL)
