= Włodzimierz Bernacki =

Polish politician (born 1960)

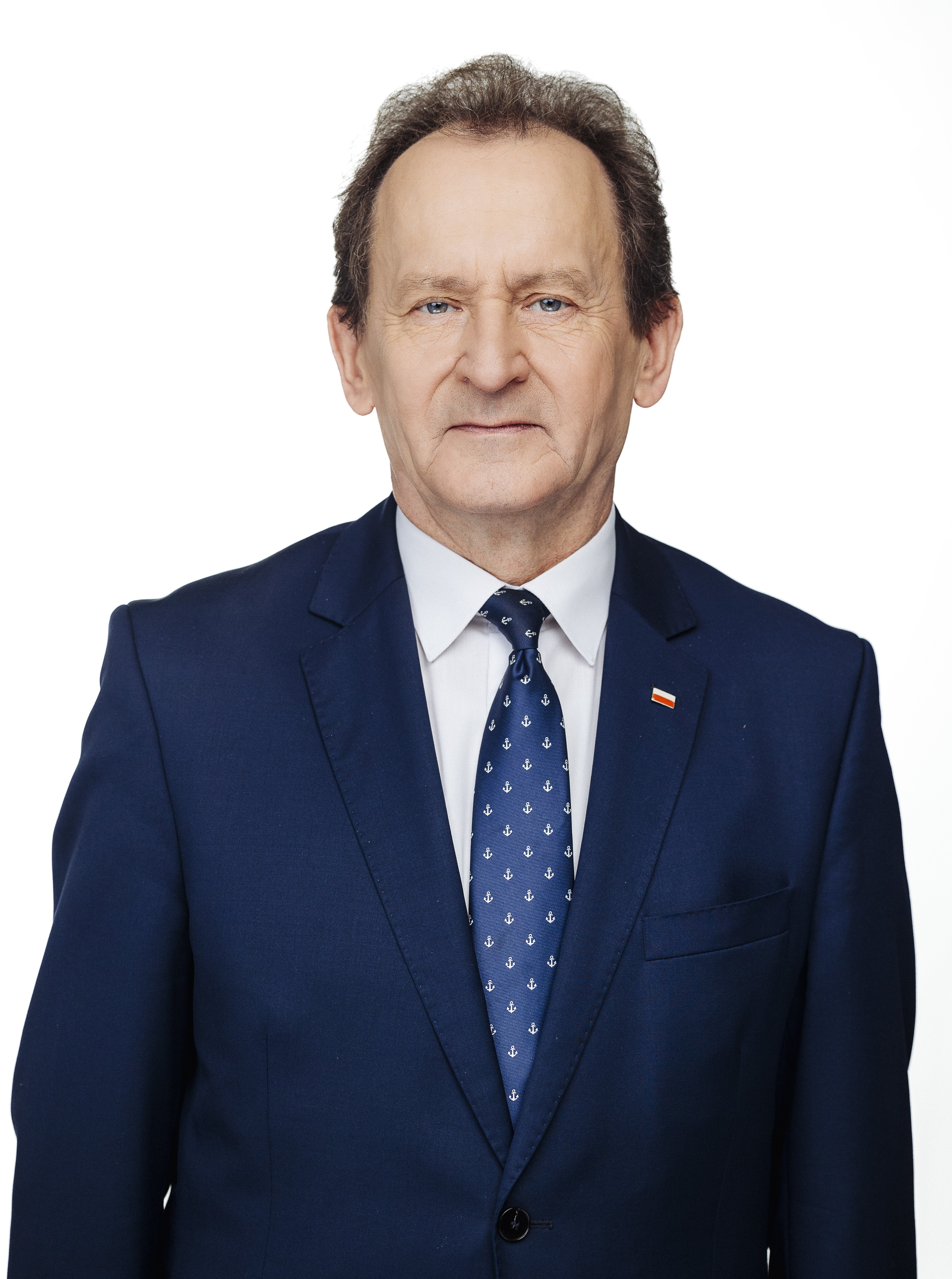

Member of the Senate of Poland
- Incumbent
- Assumed office October 13, 2019
- Constituency: 34-Tarnów

Member of the Sejm
- In office 2011 — 2019
- Constituency: 15-Tarnów

Personal details
- Born: 17 February 1960 (age 66) Proszowice, Polish People's Republic
- Party: Law and Justice

Włodzimierz Bernacki (born 17 February 1960 in Proszowice) is a Polish politician. He was elected to the Senate of Poland (10th term) representing the constituency of Tarnów. He was also elected to the 11th term.
