= Bogusław Wołoszański =

Polish journalist, author, populariser of history and politician

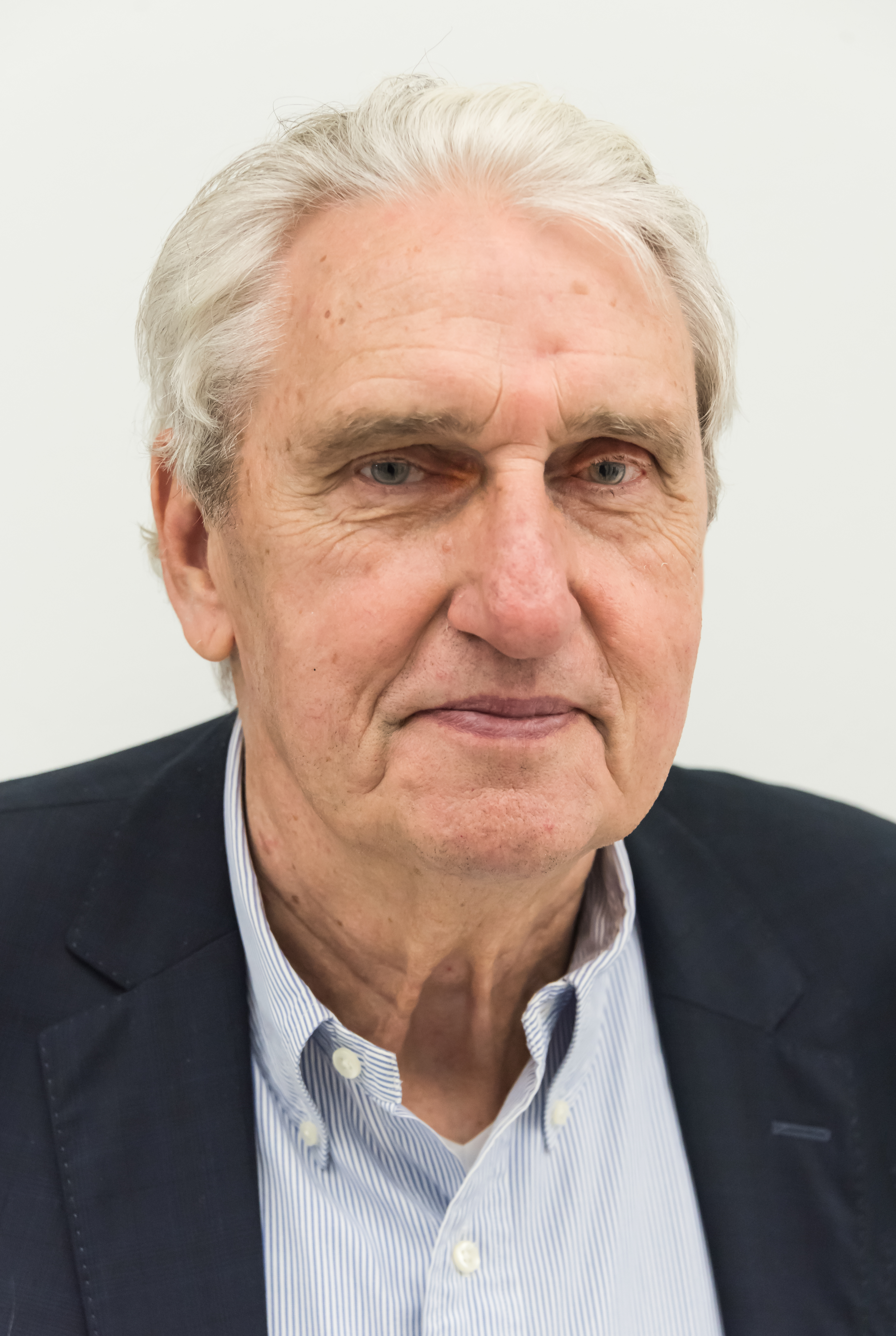
Bogusław Wołoszański in 2023

Bogusław Wołoszański (born March 22, 1950, in Piotrków Trybunalski) is a Polish journalist, author, populariser of history, and politician. He is well known as the author of historical books and the originator and creator of the TVP1 television program "Sensations of the 20th Century." Wołoszański serves as MP for the 10th Sejm.

== Early life and education ==
Bogusław Wołoszański was born to Marian Wołoszański (1908–2004), a teacher and headmaster of a boarding school in Piotrków Trybunalski, and Irena née Malinowska (1908–1992). During the September Campaign of World War II, his father served in the 25th Infantry Regiment and later became a member of the Home Army under the pseudonym "Orzeł."

Wołoszański graduated with the law degree from the Faculty of Law and Administration at the University of Warsaw in 1971 and participated in a doctoral seminar under Professor Stanisław Ehrlich. He furthered his studies at the Institute of Journalism at the University of Warsaw and, in 1979, commenced directing at the Faculty of Radio and Television at the University of Silesia, which he did not complete due to family and professional obligations.

== Professional career ==
His career began at the national council in Wieluń, followed by a collaboration with the youth editorial office of Polish Television, where he hosted "Telewizyjny Ekran Młodych." Between 1973 and 1983, he worked in the international editorial department of TVP. In 1983, he became deputy director of the educational programmes directorate and started working on "Sensations of the 20th Century" directed by Adek Drabiński. Wołoszański then spent three years in London as a correspondent and returned to become deputy director of TVP1.

Throughout his career, Wołoszański has written several books and hosted numerous programs, including "Treasures of the Third Reich" and "Secret History of the 20th Century." His work on "Sensations of the 20th Century" resumed in collaboration with Polish Television and the National Geographic channel, leading to the premiere of "Historical Guide" in 2015.

== Political career ==
Wołoszański was a member of the Polish United Workers' Party from 1976 and, in 1985, signed a cooperation agreement with Department I of the Ministry of the Interior, which facilitated his work in London. He disclosed this cooperation in a vetting declaration in 2023. Running for the Sejm in the 2023 elections, he won a seat in the 10th term, receiving 35,202 votes and serving on the Committee on Culture and Media and National Defence.

== Honours ==
In 1998, he was awarded the Knight's Cross of the Order of Polonia Restituta, one of Poland's highest honors, recognizing his exceptional service to the country. His literary excellence was celebrated with the Bolesław Prus Award in 2000, an accolade named after the renowned Polish novelist. Wołoszański's deep ties and contributions to his birthplace, Piotrków Trybunalski, were acknowledged in 2001 when he was named an honorary citizen of the city. His impact on Polish television and culture was recognized with the prestigious Wiktor award in 1993 and the Super Wiktor in 1998, highlighting his influence in media. Furthermore, in 2003, he received the Dobosz of the Wielkopolska Uprising honorary award from the Society for the Remembrance of the Greater Poland Uprising 1918/1919, honoring his efforts in promoting the history of the Wielkopolska Uprising and Polish independence.
