= Michał Połuboczek =

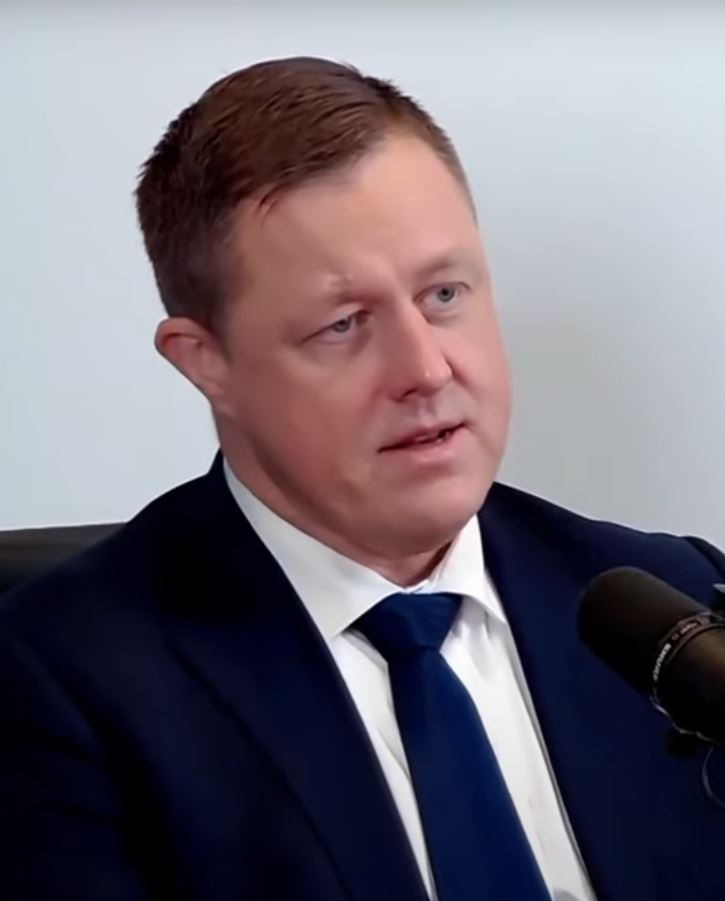
- Michał Połuboczek in 2024

Member of the Sejm
- Incumbent
- Assumed office 26 June 2024
- Constituency: 23 – Rzeszów

Personal details
- Born: 24 October 1982 (age 43) Olecko
- Party: New Hope
- Spouse: Agnieszka Połuboczek
- Education: SGH Warsaw School of Economics

Michał Połuboczek (born 24 October 1982) is a Polish politician and entrepreneur, he serves as a member of the 10th term Sejm.

== Early life and education ==
Połuboczek used to live in Suwałki. He studied at the SGH Warsaw School of Economics. He obtained a higher education. He ran a business in the photovoltaic industry.

== Political career ==
In 2006, he unsuccessfully ran for councilor of Suwałki from the Law and Justice list.

In 2023, he ran for the Sejm from the list of the Confederation Liberty and Independence in the Rzeszów district, obtaining 6287 votes. In 2024, he took over the parliamentary seat vacated by Grzegorz Braun elected to the European Parliament.

== Personal life ==
Połuboczek is married to Agnieszka Połuboczek.
