= Dorota Niedziela =

Polish politician

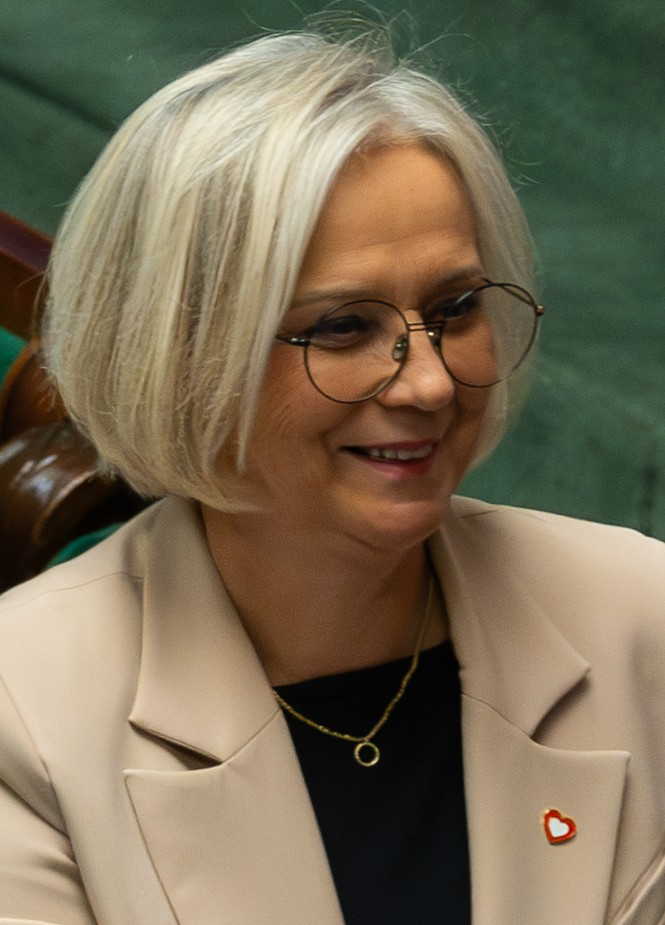
- Niedziela in 2024

Deputy Marshal of the Sejm
- Incumbent
- Assumed office 13 November 2023 Serving with See List
- Marshal: Szymon Hołownia; Włodzimierz Czarzasty

Member of the Sejm
- Incumbent
- Assumed office 9 November 2011
- Constituency: No. 12 (Chrzanów)

Secretary of State in the Ministry of the Environment
- In office 16 June 2015 – 11 November 2015

Personal details
- Born: Dorota Siwiec; 20 August 1964 (age 61) Oświęcim, Poland
- Party: Civic Platform (since 2001)
- Other political affiliations: Civic Coalition (2018–present)

Dorota Niedziela, née Siwiec (born August 20, 1964, in Oświęcim) is a Polish politician and veterinarian. She has been a member of the Sejm (Polish Parliament) for the 7th, 8th, 9th, and 10th terms (since 2011). She served as Secretary of State in the Ministry of the Environment in 2015 and has been the Deputy Marshal of the Sejm for the 10th term since 2023.

== Biography ==
In 1991, she graduated from the Wrocław University of Environmental and Life Sciences. She also completed postgraduate studies in veterinary surgery and radiology at the same university. She began her professional career as a veterinarian and became a co-owner of veterinary clinics in Kęty and Bielsko-Biała. She was appointed to the board of the Silesian Veterinary Polyclinic in 2006 and became the Secretary of the Polish Association of Veterinarians in 2010.

In 2001, she took part in organizing the local structures of the Civic Platform in Kęty. She unsuccessfully ran for the council of the Oświęcim County in 2006 and for the Lesser Poland Voivodeship Sejmik in 2010. In the 2011 parliamentary elections, she won a seat in the Sejm on the Civic Platform list, receiving 6,166 votes in the Chrzanów constituency. On June 16, 2015, she was appointed Secretary of State in the Ministry of the Environment. She held this position until November 11, 2015.

In the 2015 elections, she was re-elected to the Sejm, receiving 7,967 votes. In the 8th term of the Sejm, she became the Deputy Chairwoman of the Agriculture and Rural Development Committee and a member of the Environment, Natural Resources, and Forestry Committee. She unsuccessfully ran in the 2019 European Parliament elections. However, in the same year, she was re-elected to the Sejm, running as a candidate of the Civic Coalition and receiving 22,013 votes. In December 2021, she was elected vice-chairwoman of the Civic Platform. In 2023, she retained her parliamentary seat for another term, receiving 28,783 votes. On November 13, 2023, she was elected Deputy Marshal of the Sejm of the 10th term.

== Results in National Elections ==
| Election | Electoral Committee | Office | District | Result |
|---|---|---|---|---|
| 2011 | Civic Platform | Sejm (7th term) | no. 12 | 6,166 (2.58%) ✓ |
| 2015 | Civic Platform | Sejm (8th term) | no. 12 | 7,967 (2.93%) ✓ |
| 2019 | European Coalition | European Parliament (9th term) | no. 10 | 11,814 (0.68%) ✗ |
| 2019 | Civic Coalition | Sejm (9th term) | no. 12 | 22,013 (6.96%) ✓ |
| 2023 | Civic Coalition | Sejm (10th term) | no. 12 | 28,783 (7.89%) ✓ |

== Personal life ==
Her husband was Marcin Niedziela, the Oświęcim county mayor and a politician from the Civic Platform, who died in 2021. She has two daughters.
