= Marcin Porzucek =

Polish politician (born 1984)

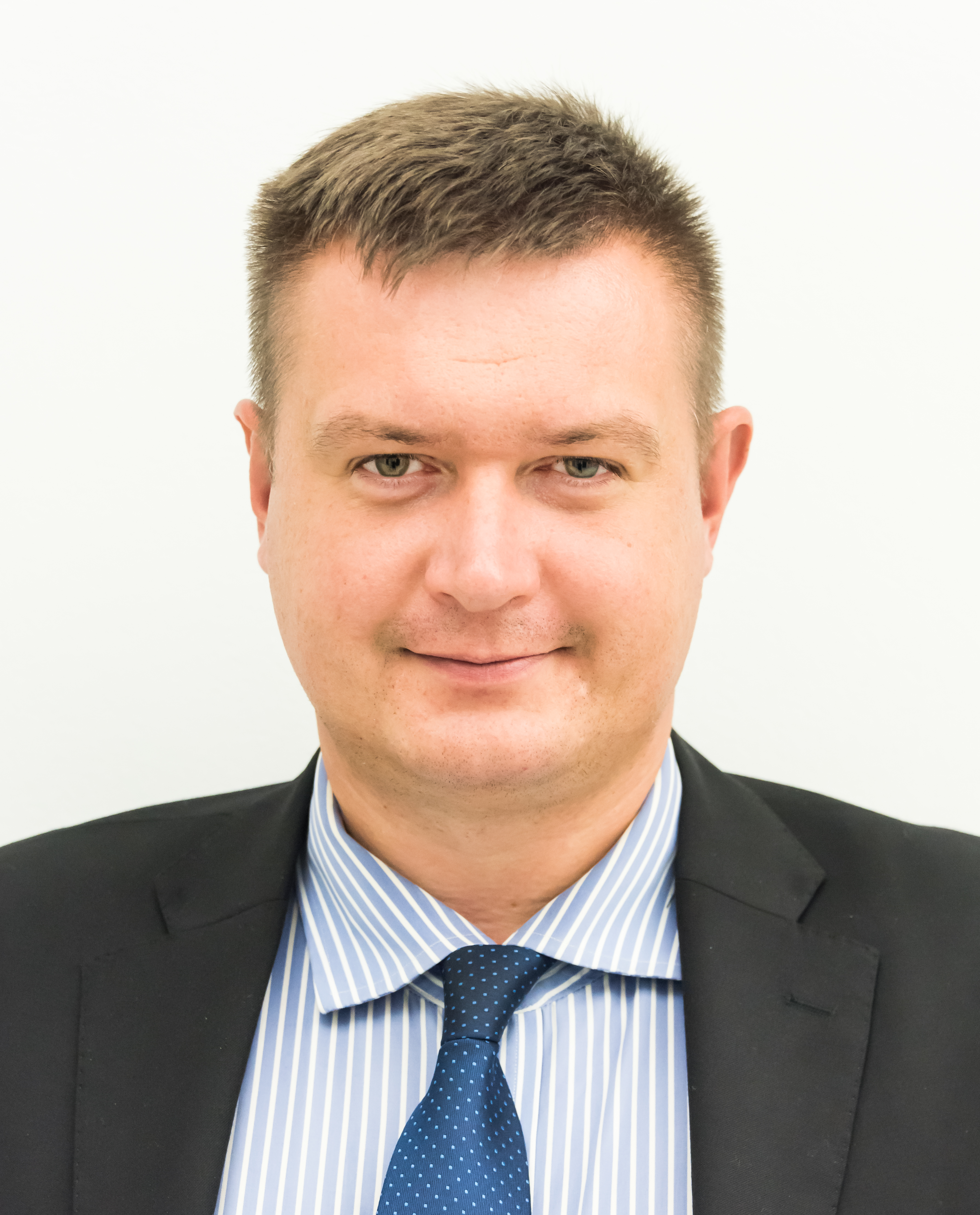

Member of the Polish Parliament
- Incumbent
- Assumed office 2015

Personal details
- Born: July 20, 1984 (age 40); Kielce, Poland
- Political party: Law and Justice
- Occupation: Politician

Marcin Bartosz Porzucek (born July 20, 1984, in Kielce, Poland) is a Polish politician and local government official, serving as a member of the Polish Parliament (Sejm) in the VIII, IX, and X terms.

== Biography ==
He holds a degree in political science, graduating from the College of International and American Studies in Warsaw (2013). He also completed postgraduate studies in Poland's energy security at Collegium Civitas (2014). Porzucek became involved in the activities of the Law and Justice party and served as the director of Maks Kraczkowski's parliamentary office.

He was elected as a councilor in the Greater Poland Voivodeship Assembly in 2006, 2010, and 2014. Despite his efforts, he unsuccessfully ran for the position of the Mayor of Piła in the 2014 local elections, securing 16.48% of the votes and losing to Piotr Głowski.

In the 2015 parliamentary elections, he ran for a seat in the Piła constituency and secured a position as a member of the VIII term of the Parliament, receiving 6,690 votes.

In 2018, he once again ran as a candidate for PiS in the Piła mayoral elections but secured the second position with 21.09% of the votes, losing to the incumbent mayor, Piotr Głowski.

He also unsuccessfully contested the European Parliament elections in 2019. However, in the same year, he successfully secured re-election as a Member of Parliament, receiving 27,077 votes.

Continuing his streak, in 2023, he secured a parliamentary seat for the third consecutive term, receiving 28,293 votes.
