= Andrzej Śliwka =

Polish politician (born 1988)

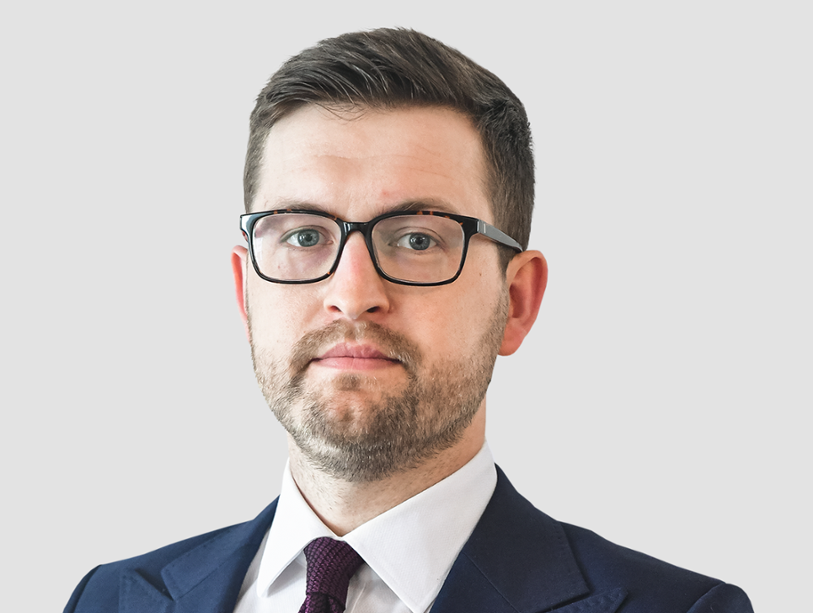
- Śliwka in 2021

Member of the Sejm
- Incumbent
- Assumed office 13 November 2023
- Constituency: Elbląg

Personal details
- Born: 12 October 1988 (age 37)
- Party: Law and Justice

Andrzej Śliwka (born 12 October 1988) is a Polish politician of Law and Justice who was elected member of the Sejm in 2023. He served as deputy minister of state assets from 2020 to 2023, and was the candidate of Law and Justice for mayor of Elbląg in the 2024 local elections.
