= Magdalena Roguska =

Polish politician (born 1980)

- Roguska in 2024.

Member of Sejm of Poland
- Incumbent
- Assumed office 26 June 2024
- Constituency: No. 19

Member of the Warsaw City Council
- In office 2018–2024
- Constituency: No. 6

Member of the Białołęka District Council
- In office 2006–2018
- Constituency: No. 3

Personal details
- Born: 22 June 1980 (age 46) Parczew, Poland
- Party: Civic Platform
- Education: Cardinal Stefan Wyszyński University
- Occupation: Politician

Magdalena Roguska (Polish: [mæɡdəˈlɛnə rɔˈɡu.ska]; née Pastusiak, Polish: [pasˈtu.ɕak]; born 22 June 1980) is a Polish politician representing constituency no. 19 in the Sejm of Poland since 2024 as part of the Civic Coalition. From 2006 to 2014, she was a member of the council of the district of Białołęka, and from 2018 to 2024, she was a member of the Warsaw City Council.

== Biography ==
Magdalena Roguska (née Pastusiak) was born on 22 June 1980 in Parczew, Poland.

In 2005 she graduated from the Cardinal Stefan Wyszyński University in Warsaw, with the master's degree in Polish studies. Roguska joined the Civic Platform party. She became a treasurer of Warsaw division, and worked in the office of the party parliamentary group.

In 2006 Roguska was elected to the council of Białołęka, one of the districts of Warsaw. She was later reelected in 2010 and 2014. From 2014 to 2018, she was the deputy chairperson of the council. In 2018 she was elected to the Warsaw City Council, and since 2020, she was its deputy chairperson. Roguska was reelected in 2024.

From December 2023 to February 2024, she was a member of the supervisory board of the Polish Security Printing Works. She was also head of the political office of Minister of the Interior and Administration, Marcin Kierwiński.

In 2023, Roguska unsuccessfully run for the office of a member of Sejm of Poland. She was a candidate of the Civic Coalition in the constituency no. 19, which consists of the city of Warsaw. Roguska received 6,193 votes (0.36%). On 26 June 2024, she was appointed to the office of the member of Sejm, replacing Michał Szczerba, who became a Member of the European Parliament. She became a deputy chairperson of the Commission of Social and Family Politics, and a member of the Commission of European Union, Commission of Statute and Matters of Members of Sejm and Immunity, and the Commission of Children's and Yough Matters.
