= Waldemar Andzel =

Polish politician (born 1971)

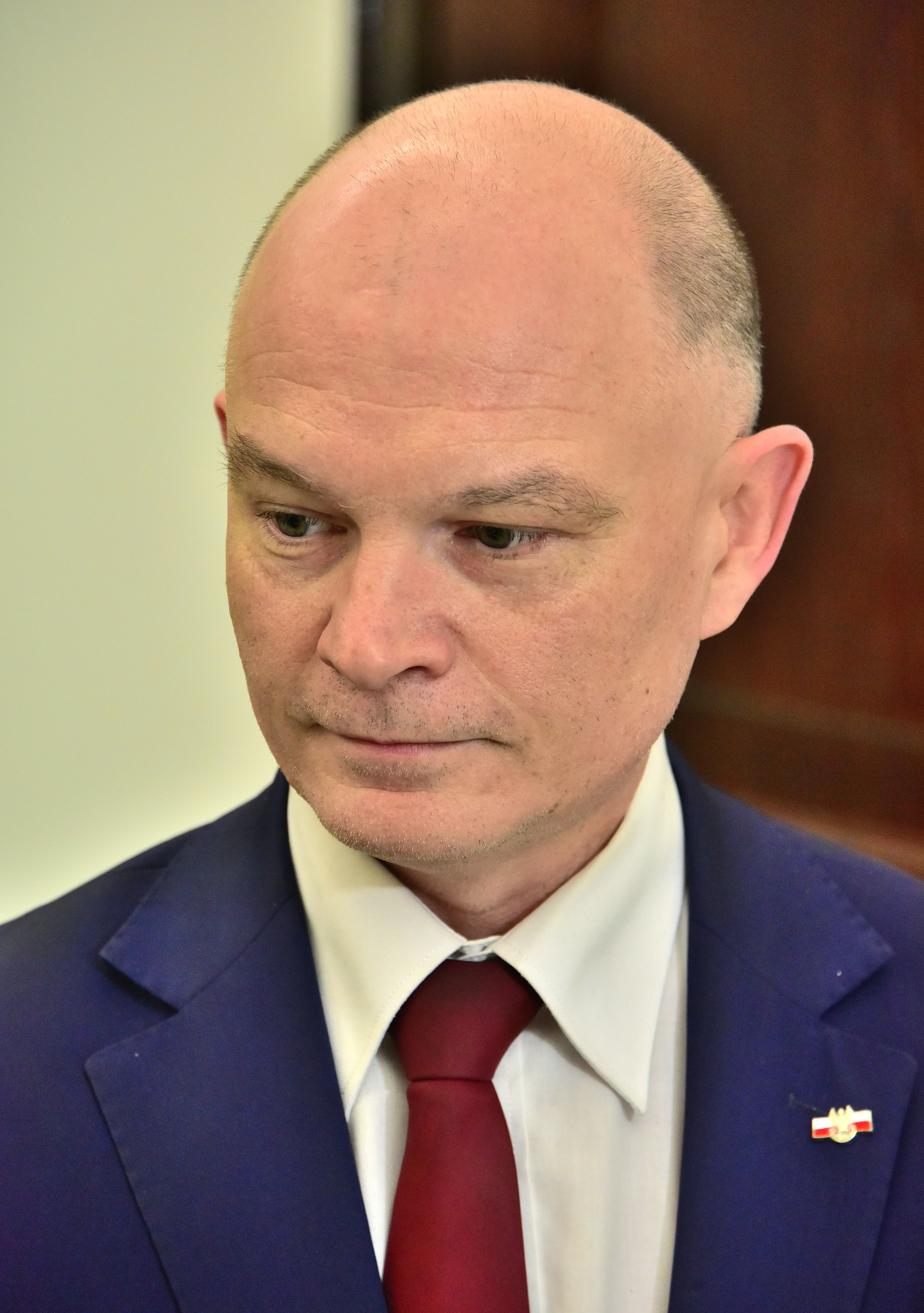
- Waldemar Andzel in 2018

Deputy of the Sejm
- Incumbent
- Assumed office September 25, 2005
- Constituency: 32 Katowice (since 2019); 32 Sosnowiec (until 2019)

Personal details
- Born: September 17, 1971 (age 54); Czeladź, Polish People's Republic
- Political party: Law and Justice

Waldemar Franciszek Andzel (born 17 September 1971) is a Polish politician.

== Biography ==
He was born in Czeladź and was elected to the Sejm on 25 September 2005, getting 4,257 votes in 32 Sosnowiec district as a candidate from the Law and Justice list. As of 2025, he has been elected to 6 consecutive terms in the Sejm.

== See also ==
- Members of Polish Sejm 2005-2007
