= Krzysztof Czarnecki =

Polish politician (born 1957)

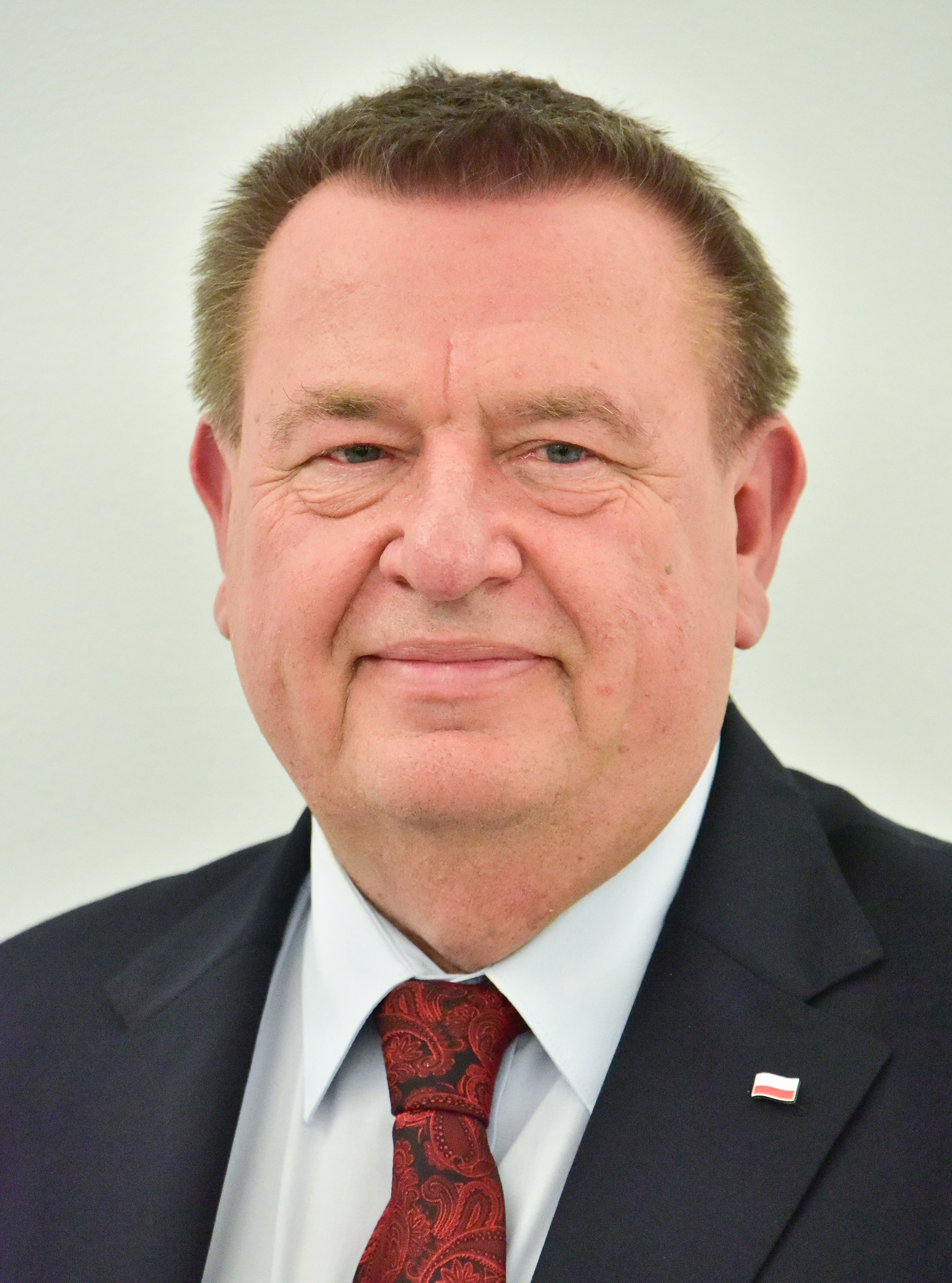
- Czarnecki in 2019

member of Sejm 2005-2007
- In office 25 September 2005 – 2007

Personal details
- Born: 1957 (age 68–69)
- Party: Law and Justice

Krzysztof Władysław Czarnecki (born 25 October 1957 in Trzcianka) is a Polish politician. He was elected to the Sejm on 25 September 2005, getting 3406 votes in 38 Piła district as a candidate from the Law and Justice list.

== See also ==
- Members of Polish Sejm 2005-2007
