= Civic Coalition (party) =

Political party in Poland

Civic Coalition Koalicja Obywatelska
- Abbreviation: KO
- Leader: Donald Tusk
- General Secretary: Marcin Kierwiński
- Founder: Donald Tusk
- Founded: 25 October 2025; 11 months ago
- Registered: 21 November 2025; 10 months ago
- Merger of: Civic Platform; Modern; Polish Initiative
- Headquarters: ul. Wiejska 12A, 00-490 Warsaw
- Membership (2026): 21,000+
- Ideology: Liberal conservatism Christian democracy Pro-Europeanism
- Political position: Centre-right
- National affiliation: Civic Coalition
- European affiliation: European People's Party
- European Parliament group: European People's Party Group
- Colours: Red; Blue; Orange (customary)
- Sejm: 142 / 460
- Senate: 36 / 100
- European Parliament: 21 / 53
- Regional assemblies: 210 / 552
- City presidents: 39 / 107

Website
- koalicjaobywatelska.pl

The Civic Coalition (Polish: Koalicja Obywatelska, KO) is a political party in Poland. It was created on 25 October 2025 from a merger of Civic Platform (PO), Modern (N.) and Polish Initiative (iPL). It has been described as a renamed and enlarged PO, given that PO was the dominant partner in the merger. The party is based on the statute of Civic Platform.

The three parties, along with the Greens, formed an electoral alliance in 2018 also known as the Civic Coalition. In October 2025, it was decided that the parties would merge into a single party with a name and logo identical to that of the 2018 Civic Coalition, while the party's flag was decided to be the logo of the Civic Platform. The Greens did not participate in the merger, opting to remain a separate party instead.

== History ==
In October 2025, the ruling party Civic Platform and its two minor partners, Modern and Polish Initiative, announced their party plans to merge into a single party. The merger was planned to take place earlier in autumn of 2025, but it was delayed by negotiations between the regional branches of the merging parties. In October, it was announced that the national convention of the new party would take place on 25 October 2025.

At the convention, the new logo and name of the party was revealed. The new party took the same logo and name as the Civic Coalition alliance created for the 2019 Polish parliamentary election. The main members of this coalition became Civic Platform, Modern, Polish Initiative and the Greens. Proposals to transform the Civic Coalition into a single party already appeared in 2019, but were never realized. All three parties are also to unite into a single parliamentary group. Political pundits described the unification as a greater concentration of power within the Civic Platform, the dominating party within the merger.

The logo of both the party and coalition became a white and red heart, described as "the hallmark of KO parliamentarians". Some members of the coalition, such as the Greens, did not participate in the merger, opting to remain an independent party instead. Two days prior to the convention, Civic Platform, Modern and Polish Initiative declared that they recognize the "programmatic and identity autonomy" of the Greens. The political party Modern dissolved itself a day before the convention, on 24 October. Polish Initiative is to dissolve on 15 November.

Civic Coalition will start elections of its leadership within a month after the convention. The unification and leadership election process is set to conclude on 24 January 2026. The leadership is to be elected by all dues-paying members of the merged parties, which is estimated to be around 25,000 people. Civic Coalition held a convention on its political program on 26 October. The convention was closed off to the media; politicians of the Civic Coalition stated that the political program convention discussed "security, economic competitiveness, and nuclear energy", and that one of the party's postulates is the construction of the Satellite Operations Center (Polish: Centrum Operacji Satelitarnych).

At the end of October, Donald Tusk announced that the Civic Coalition would reactivate the Civic Institute (Polish: Instytut Obywatelski), Civic Platform's think tank that stopped its activities after the 2023 Polish parliamentary election. By early November, it was reported that about a half (~400) of former Modern members joined the Civic Coalition; Nowoczesna was also found to owe 2 million PLN in debts, which had to be covered. On 15 November, Polish Initiative formally dissolved itself as a party to complete its merger into Civic Coalition. The majority of party members declared that they would now join the Civic Coalition. Political scientist Paweł Trawicki argued that the Polish Initiative would represent a "more centre-left wing" of the KO, although Polish Initiative only had about a hundred members at dissolution, compared to almost 25,000 members of Civic Platform.

On 21 November, the party was registered as the Polish court confirmed the change of Civic Platform's name and statute. In December 2025, the party informed that the elections of local circles and their boards will take place between 17 January and 20 February 2026. On 8 March 2026, the party will also elect the party chairman. Until the leadership election, Donald Tusk has been appointed as the interim leader of the party.

On 17 January 2026, the deadline for registering chairman candidates had passed. Only one candidate was registered, the current party leader Donald Tusk, ensuring his uncontested election on 8 March. Between 14 and 28 of March, the party was also to elect its National Council, audit committees, and peer courts.

On 8 March 2026, the party elected its county and regional leaders, as well as party chairman. The leader of the party, Donald Tusk, was elected the party chairman as a single candidate, receiving 97.4% of the votes, with 16,316 votes in favor and 379 votes against. Most of the party's regional leadership from Civic Platform remained unchanged and was re-elected. Two election protests were lodged in the Lower Silesian Voivodeship and Podkarpackie Voivodeship. In the Lower Silesian case, the difference in votes between the winner, Michał Jaros, and his competitor, Monika Wielichowska, was 6 votes. The latter case concerned procedural issues during the voting. Wielichowska filed the protests against the results of the Lower Silesian leadership election, alleging that the party failed to ensure the secrecy of voting, and her opponent conducted open campaigning within the polling station. At the time of the election, the party had over 21,000 members eligible for voting, with about 17,000 partaking in the elections.

== Ideology ==
The party has been described as liberal-conservative, moderately conservative, conservative, Christian democratic, a centrist-liberal force, the "centre-right/liberal option", as well as a party that includes conservatives as well as "more liberal" factions. Civic Coalition presents conservative, centrist and liberal tendencies. Zbigniew Konwiński, one of the leaders of the 2018 Civic Coalition, described the party as "broad centre" that is united by "the rule of law, Poland's place in the European Union, commitment to European values". The party is considered to represent the middle-class electorate. The party's proposed policies include cutting health insurance tax for businesses, and opposition to cadastral tax.

Polish political scientist Paweł Trawicki argued that Polish Initiative brings a "more centre-left wing" to the party; while TVP World described KO as a merger of "the center-right Civic Platform" with "centrist Nowoczesna (Modern) party and the progressive Polish Initiative". In contrast, Elodie Thevenin of Jagiellonian University described all three parties as centre-right. Political scientist Andrzej Zybała stated that the party is a rename of Civic Platform, arguing that "the Civic Platform merged with much smaller entities" and that "the Polish Initiative was never a large party." Polish political newspaper Rzeczpospolita argues that KO intends to present a centre-right profile, as it has shifted to the right on ECHR, immigration and abortion. Jarosław Woźniak of the University of Wrocław stated that "although it was brought to power largely by women's votes", Civic Coalition did "nothing to change the inhumane abortion law, thus clearly positioning itself as a right-wing party." Michał Kolanko wrote that "Tusk chose a clearly centre-right course for KO."

The party describes itself as pro-European. However, it criticizes the European Convention on Human Rights (ECHR); Donald Tusk, the prime minister from the party, described immigration as "the greatest threat" that leads to "increasingly difficult ethnic and cultural relations in our societies". He argued that the ECHR is overtly restrictive and hampers effective anti-immigration policies, and that if the signatories to the convention "cannot agree on its reform, it is quite reasonable to consider simply leaving it". Commenting on the party's declaration, Krytyka Polityczna criticized KO as a "conservative party of power" that is "incapable of defending liberal principles", while The Sunday Times wrote that the party's stance on ECHR aligns with Reform UK and the British Conservative Party.

During the government of Law and Justice (2015-2023), the Civic Coalition's predecessor (the 2018 Civic Coalition) was said to have drifted towards "more left-liberal" positions, but after coming to power, it was described to have shifted towards the right. Shortly before Civic Coalition was formed as a party in October 2025, Rafał Soborski of the Richmond American University London described Civic Coalition as "really right-wing", arguing that it is "a neoliberal/neoconservative party" and that it "resembles the Tories under Cameron before their shift in a far-right direction." After Civic Coalition was formed as a party, it is considered to have continued the right-wing shift, opposing the Green Deal, shifting conservative on gender issues, and supporting deregulation in its EU-level votes.

== Structure ==
=== Party leader ===
| No. | Image | Chairman | Tenure |
|---|---|---|---|
| 1 | | Donald Tusk | 25 October 2025 – Incumbent |

== See also ==
- Civic Platform
- Politics of Poland
- List of political parties in Poland
- Liberalism in Poland
