= Ewa Malik =

Polish politician (born 1961)

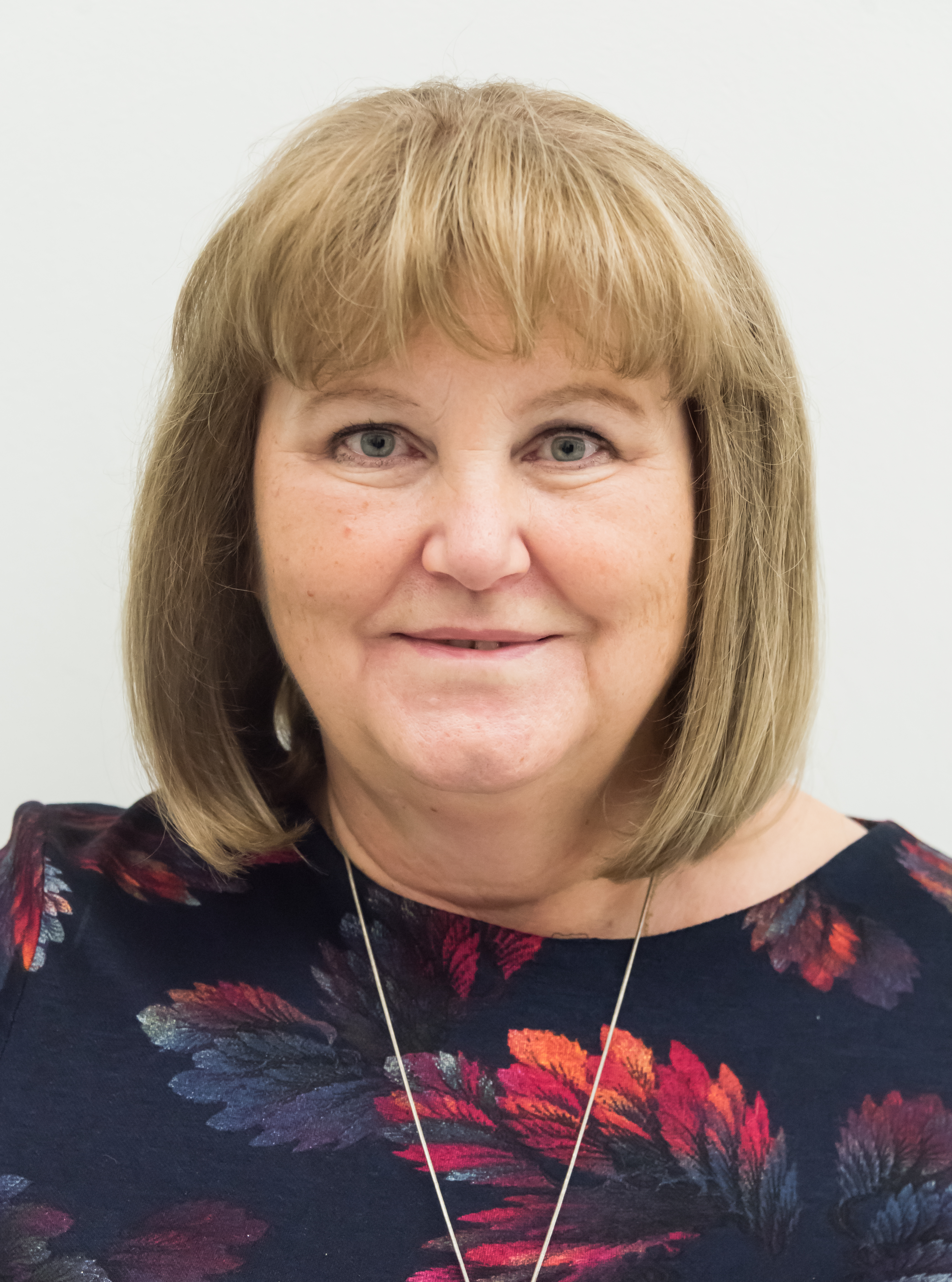

Member of Sejm 2005-2007
- In office 25 September 2005 – ?

Personal details
- Born: 11 January 1961 (age 65)
- Party: Law and Justice

Ewa Danuta Malik (born 11 January 1961 in Sosnowiec) is a Polish politician. She was elected to the Sejm on 25 September 2005, getting 16 537 votes in 32 Sosnowiec district as a candidate from the Law and Justice list.

== See also ==
- Members of Polish Sejm 2005-2007
