= Sejm Constituency no. 16 =

Polish parliamentary constituency

Coordinates: 52°33′00″N 19°42′00″E

Płock
- Polish: Okręg wyborczy Płock
- Constituency for the National Assembly of the Republic of Poland
- Boundary of the Płock Constituency in Poland for the 2023 general election.
- Counties in Masovian Voivodeship: Ciechanów, Gostynin, Mława, Płock, Płońsk, Przasnysz, Sierpc, Sochaczew, Żuromin, and Żyrardów
- City Counties in Masovian Voivodeship: Płock

Current constituency
- Sejm Deputies: 10
- Sejm District: 16
- European Parliament constituency: Masovian
- Voivodeship sejmik: Masovian Regional Assembly

Płock is a Polish parliamentary constituency in the Masovian Voivodeship. It elects ten members of the Sejm.

The district has the number '16' for elections to the Sejm and is named after the city of Płock. It includes the counties of Ciechanów, Gostynin, Mława, Płock, Płońsk, Przasnysz, Sierpc, Sochaczew, Żuromin, and Żyrardów, and the city county of Płock.

== List of members ==
=== 2023-2027 ===
Member	Party
Kamil Bortniczuk	Law and Justice
Anna Cicholska	Law and Justice
Elżbieta Gapińska	Civic Coalition
Marcin Kierwiński	Civic Coalition
Adam Krzemiński	Civic Coalition
Maciej Małecki	Law and Justice
Mirosław Adam Orliński	Polish People's Party
Jacek Ozdoba	Law and Justice
Piotr Zgorzelski	Polish People's Party
