= Grzegorz Płaczek =

Polish politician (born 1978)

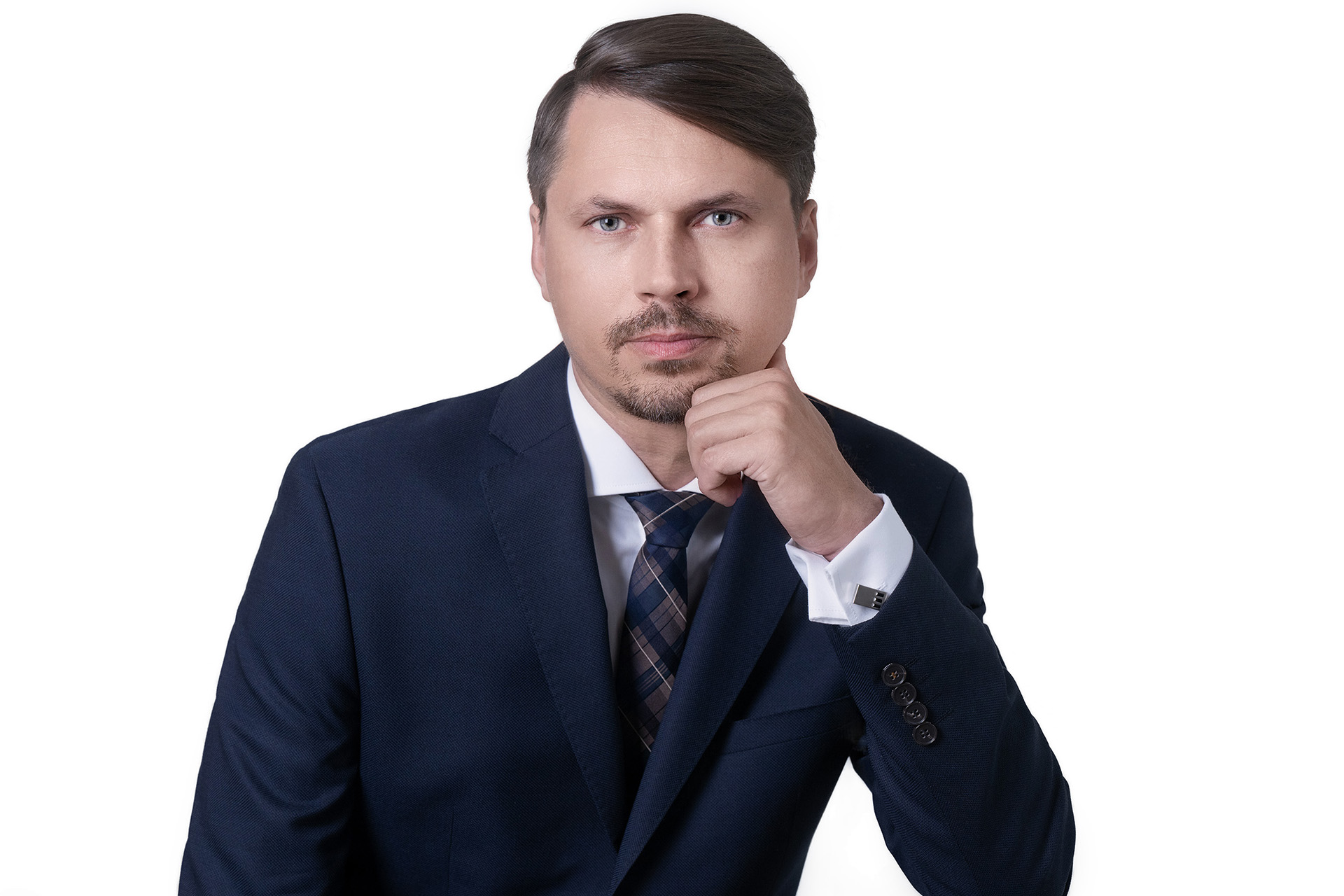
- Płaczek in 2023

Member of the Sejm
- Incumbent
- Assumed office 13 November 2023
- Constituency: Katowice

Personal details
- Born: 13 May 1978 (age 47) Tarnowskie Góry, Poland
- Party: New Hope
- Other political affiliations: Confederation Liberty and Independence

Grzegorz Płaczek (born 13 May 1978) is a Polish politician serving as a member of the Sejm since 2023. He has served as group leader of the Confederation Liberty and Independence since 2025.

== Early life and education ==
Płaczek was born in Tarnowskie Góry, Poland. He graduated with a Magister in Management and Marketing from the Upper Silesian School of Economics in Katowice. He began in the Warsaw School of Economics doctoral studies in the field of economic sciences though he has never completed this course.
