= Mateusz Bochenek =

Polish politician (born 1993)

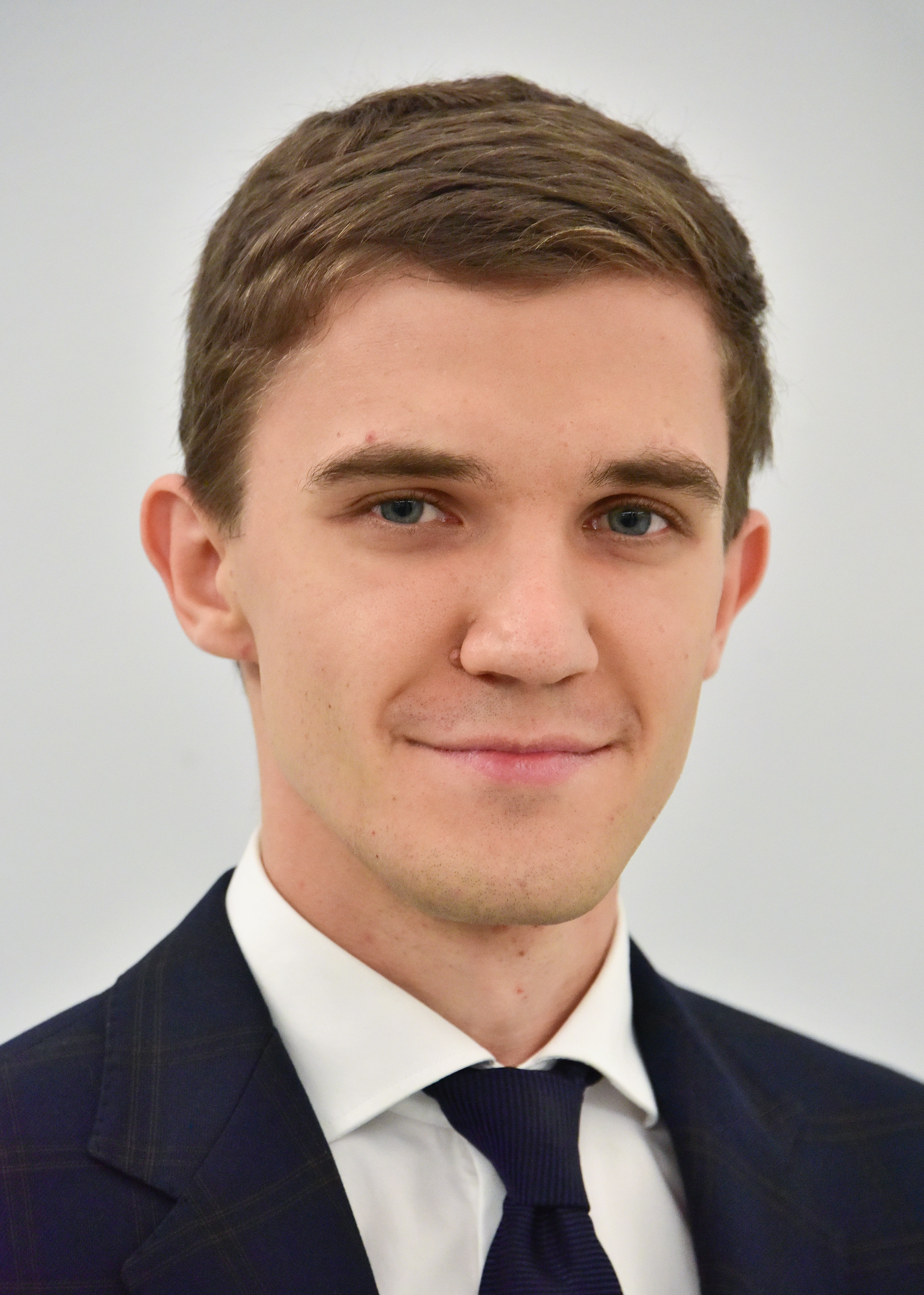
- Parliamentary group: Civic Platform

Personal details
- Born: 12 April 1993 (age 33) Sosnowiec
- Education: University of Silesia in Katowice

Mateusz Bochenek (born 12 April 1993) is a Polish politician. From 2018 to 2019 he was chairman of the Sosnowiec city council, a member of the Polish parliament of the 9th term.

== Memoir ==
A graduate of the Second High School "Emilia Plater" in Sosnowiec. He graduated from University of Silesia in Katowice. He was post-graduate in MBA studies at the WSB University in Dąbrowa Górnicza. From 2006 he was active in the youth city council, later he became its guardian on behalf of the City Council in Sosnowiec. He was also active in the council of the Maczki district (Sosnowiec), in which he held the office of chairman. He became the chairman of the "Młodzi wspólnie dla" association and a member of the social council at SP ZOZ Rejonowe Pogotowie Ratunkowe in Sosnowiec.

He became involved in political activities within the framework of the Civic Platform. He was an assistant to the marshal of the Silesian Voivodeship. In 2014, he became the assistant of the President of Sosnowiec Arkadiusz Chęciński, in March 2018 he took the position of his plenipotentiary for culture and promotion of the city and cooperation with non-governmental organizations. In 2018 he was elected the city councilor of Sosnowiec, he became the chairman of this body. In the parliamentary election in 2019, he was elected a deputy to the Sejm of the Republic of Poland of the 9th term in the Sosnowiec constituency (he won 15,421 votes). He became the second youngest member of this term.
