= Zbigniew Konwiński =

Polish politician (born 1974)

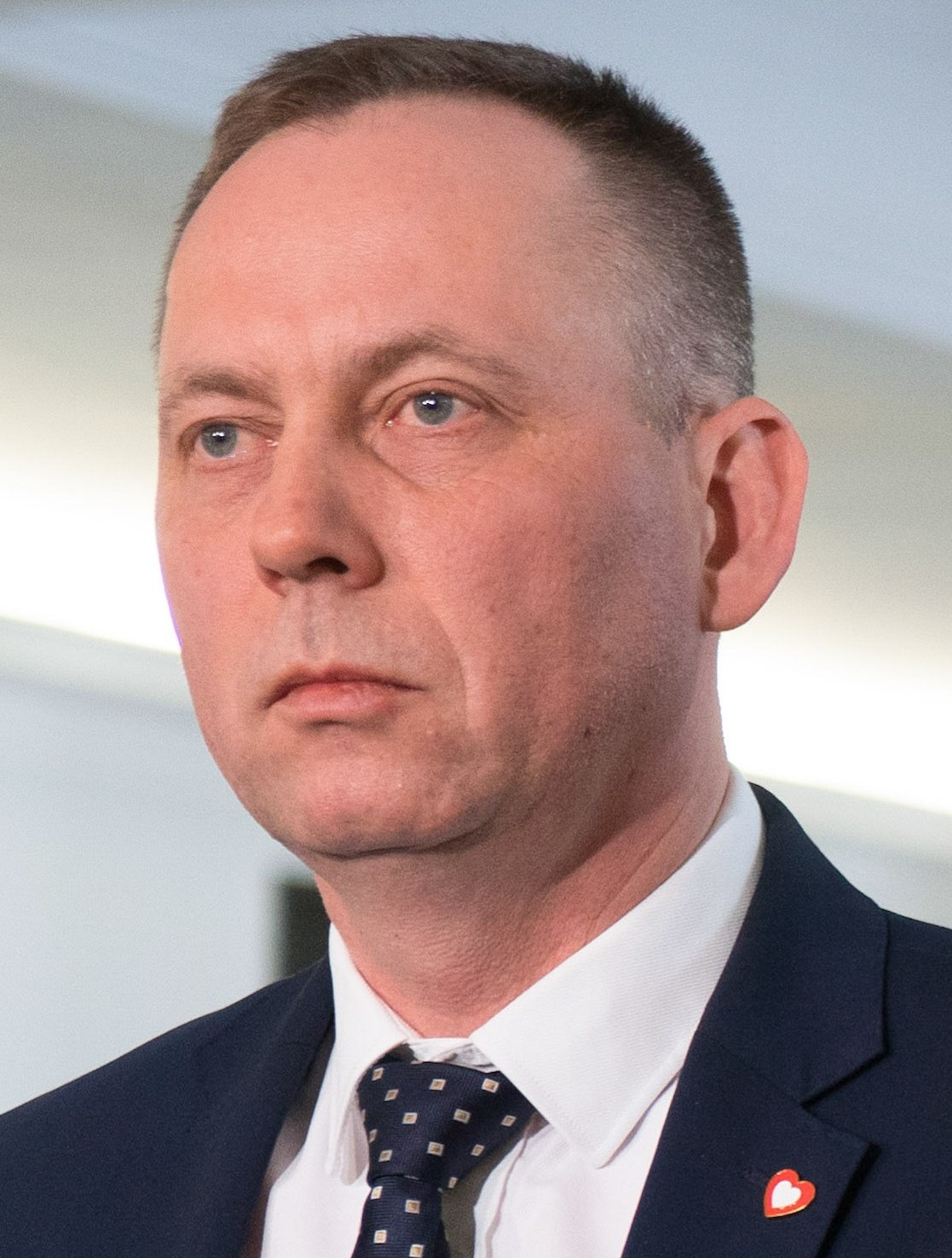
- Konwiński in 2024

Member of the Sejm
- Incumbent
- Assumed office 5 November 2007
- Constituency: Słupsk

Personal details
- Born: 24 March 1974 (age 52)
- Party: Civic Platform

Zbigniew Konwiński (born 24 March 1974) is a Polish politician serving as a member of the Sejm since 2007. He has served as group leader of the Civic Coalition since 2023.
