= List of Sejm members (2015–2019) =

8th term of the Sejm

The eighth term of the Sejm of the Republic of Poland ran from 12 November 2015 until 2019.

== Officers ==
	Name	Party	Notes
Senior Marshal	Kornel Morawiecki	Kukiz'15	Served from 12 November 2015
Marshal	Marek Kuchciński	Law and Justice	Served from 12 November 2015 to 9 August 2019
Marshal	Elżbieta Witek	Law and Justice	Served from 9 August 2019 to 11 November 2019
Deputy Marshals	Joachim Brudziński	Law and Justice	Served from 12 November 2015 to 9 January 2018
Deputy Marshals	Beata Mazurek	Law and Justice	Served from 11 January 2018 to 26 May 2019
Deputy Marshals	Małgorzata Gosiewska	Law and Justice	Served from 12 June 2019 to 11 November 2019
Deputy Marshals	Barbara Dolniak	Civic Platform	Served from 12 November 2015 to 11 November 2019
Deputy Marshals	Małgorzata Kidawa-Błońska	Civic Platform	Served from 12 November 2015 to 11 November 2019
Deputy Marshals	Ryszard Terlecki	Law and Justice	Served from 12 November 2015 to 11 November 2019
Deputy Marshals	Stanisław Tyszka	Kukiz'15	Served from 12 November 2015 to 11 November 2019

== Members of Sejm ==
Prawo i Sprawiedliwość
Andrzej Adamczyk; Tomasz Zieliński; Waldemar Andzel; Dorota Arciszewska-Mielewczyk; Piotr Uruski; Piotr Uściński; Teresa Wargocka; Robert Warwas; Jan Warzecha; Małgorzata Wassermann; Roman Sasin; Norbert Kaczmarczyk; Maciej Wąsik; Rafał Weber; Jerzy Wilk; Elżbieta Witek; Grzegorz Lorek; Michał Wojtkiewicz; Grzegorz Woźniak; Tadeusz Woźniak; Michał Wójcik; Krystyna Wróblewska; Jan Ardanowski; Iwona Arent; Marek Ast; Zbigniew Babalski; Piotr Babinetz; Ryszard Bartosik; Barbara Bartuś; Dariusz Bąk; Mieczyslaw Baszko; Lucjan Cichosz; Jarosław Gowin; Kazimierz Gwiazdowski; Teresa Hałas; Marcin Horała; Józefina Hrynkiewicz; Michał Jach; Jerzy Naszkiewicz; Wiesław Janczyk; Grzegorz Janik; Małgorzata Janowska; Mariusz Jędrysek; Agnieszka Soin; Alicja Kaczorowska; Jarosław Kaczyński; Piotr Kaleta; Mariusz Kamiński; Elżbieta Płonka; Anna Paluch; Jerzy Paul; Krystyna Pawłowicz; Grzegorz Piechowiak; Sylwester Chruszcz; Dariusz Piontkowski; Stanisław Piotrowicz; Jerzy Polaczek; Marek Polak; Piotr Polak; Włodzimierz Bernacki; Jerzy Bielecki; Artur Zasada; Sławomir Zawiślak; Łukasz Zbonikowski	Jarosław Zieliński; Zbigniew Ziobro; Maria Zuba; Bartłomiej Wróblewski; Małgorzata Wypych; Marek Zagórski; Małgorzata Zwiercan; Katarzyna Dutkiewicz; Krzysztof Zaremba; Zbigniew Gryglas; Mariusz Błaszczak; Jacek Bogucki; Joanna Borowiak; Agata Borowiec; Bożena Borys-Szopa; Maciej Badora; Barbara Bubula; Wojciech Buczak; Waldemar Buda; Lidia Burzyńska; Zbigniew Chmielowiec; Anna Cicholska; Szymon Giżyński; Teresa Glenc; Piotr Gliński; Mariusz Trepka; Krzysztof Głuchowski; Małgorzata Golińska; Kazimierz Gołojuch; Jarosław Gonciarz; Małgorzata Gosiewska; Jerzy Gosiewski; Jan Kilian; Agnieszka Soin; Lech Kołakowski; Robert Kołakowski; Joanna Kopcińska; Wojciech Kossakowski; Andrzej Kosztowniak; Henryk Kowalczyk; Bartosz Kownacki; Ewa Kozanecka; Jacek Sasin; Anna Schmidt-Rodziewicz; Kamil Bortniczuk; Łukasz Schreiber; Jarosław Sellin; Edward Siarka; Anna Siarkowska; Wojciech Skurkiewicz; Andrzej Smirnow; Kazimierz Smoliński; Anna Sobecka; Czesław Sobierajski; Artur Soboń; Andrzej Sośnierz; Michał Cieślak; Tadeusz Cymański; Krzysztof Czabański; Przemysław Czarnecki; Witold Czarnecki; Arkadiusz Czartoryski; Zbigniew Gryglas; Anna Czech	Anita Czerwińska; Katarzyna Czochara; Leszek Dobrzyński; Zbigniew Dolata; Antoni Duda; Elżbieta Duda; Jan Duda; Marcin Duszek; Tomasz Rzymkowski; Michał Dworczyk; Jan Dziedziczak; Tadeusz Dziuba; Barbara Dziuk; Jacek Falfus; Ewa Filipiak; Leszek Galemba; Andrzej Gawron; Andrzej Melak; Mieczysław Miazga; Iwona Michałek; Krzysztof Michałkiewicz; Anna Milczanowska; Daniel Milewski; Jan Mosiński; Kazimierz Moskal; Aleksander Mrówczyński; Arkadiusz Mularczyk; Wojciech Murdzek; Piotr Naimski; Waldemar Olejniczak; Piotr Olszówka; Adam Ołdakowski; Marek Opioła; Krzysztof Ostrowski; Jacek Osuch; Lech Sprawka; Mirosława Stachowiak-Różecka; Piotr Muller; Paweł Rychlik; Danuta Nowicka; Krzysztof Sitarski; Stefan Strzałkowski; Marek Suski; Artur Szałabawka; Wojciech Szarama; Józefa Szczurek-Żelazko; Jolanta Szczypińska; Paweł Szefernaker; Jan Szewczak; Jarosław Szlachetka; Andrzej Szlachta; Krzysztof Szulowski; Stanisław Szwed; Jarosław Krajewski; Wiesław Krajewski; Leonard Krasulski; Piotr Król; Urszula Rusecka; Marcin Porzucek; Halina Szydełko; Grzegorz Puda; Maria Nowak; Piotr Pyzik; Grzegorz Raczak	Wojciech Zubowski; Ireneusz Zyska; Adam Śnieżek; Jacek Żalek; Krzysztof Kozik; Ewa Szymańska; Szymon Szynkowski vel Sęk; Janusz Śniadek; Jacek Świat; Dominik Tarczyński; Krzysztof Tchórzewski; Robert Telus; Ryszard Terlecki; Rafał Mucha; Ewa Tomaszewska; Sylwester Tułajew; Adam Kałaska; Anna Krupka; Andrzej Kryj; Bernadeta Krynicka; Dariusz Kubiak; Marta Kubiak; Krzysztof Kubów; Marek Kuchciński; Jacek Kurzępa; Anna Kwiecień; Marek Kwitek; Tomasz Latos; Bogdan Latosiński; Józef Leśniak; Joanna Lichocka; Krzysztof Lipiec; Adam Lipiński; Paweł Lisiecki; Tomasz Ławniczak; Marzena Machałek; Krzysztof Maciejewski; Antoni Macierewicz; Ewa Malik; Jerzy Małecki; Maciej Małecki; Gabriela Masłowska; Jerzy Materna; Beata Mateusiak-Pielucha; Grzegorz Matusiak; Andrzej Matusiewicz; Marek Matuszewski; Kazimierz Matuszny; Henryk Wnorowski
Civic Coalition (Poland)
Magdalena Kochan; Agnieszka Kołacz-Leszczyńska; Ewa Kołodziej; Zbigniew Konwiński; Alicja Dąbrowska; Adam Korol; Paweł Pudłowski; Monika Rosa; Mirosław Suchoń; Jagna Marczułajtis-Walczak; Tomasz Siemoniak; Krystyna Skowrońska; Bogusław Sonik; Michał Stasiński; Paweł Suski; Michał Szczerba; Krystyna Szumilas; Bożena Szydłowska; Leszek Korzeniowski; Roman Kosecki; Tomasz Kostuś; Robert Kropiwnicki; Wojciech Król; Marek Krząkała; Henryka Krzywonos; Tomasz Kucharski; Stanisław Lamczyk; Józef Lassota; Gabriela Lenartowicz; Tomasz Lenz; Anna Wasilewska; Krzysztof Truskolarski; Kamila Gasiuk-Pihowicz; Monika Wielichowska; Izabela Leszczyna; Beata Małecka-Libera; Arkadiusz Marchewka; Antoni Mężydło; Rajmund Miller	Zbigniew Ajchler; Dorota Niedziela; Małgorzata Niemczyk; Sławomir Piechota; Paweł Papke; Barbara Dolniak; Paulina Hennig-Kloska; Ewa Lieder; Paweł Kobyliński; Zbigniew Pawłowicz; Małgorzata Pępek; Bartosz Arłukowicz; Piotr Misiło; Adam Cyrański; Paweł Arndt; Urszula Augustyn; Aldona Młyńczak; Czesław Mroczek; Izabela Mrzygłocka; Stanisław Żmijan; Joanna Mucha; Killion Munyama; Arkadiusz Myrcha; Anna Nemś; Tomasz Szymański; Iwona Śledzińska-Katarasińska; Marcin Święcicki; Cezary Tomczyk; Sławomir Neumann; Joanna Augustynowska; Tadeusz Aziewicz; Paweł Bańkowski; Anna Białkowska; Jerzy Borowczak; Krzysztof Brejza; Borys Budka; Jarosław Urbaniak; Bożenna Bukiewicz; Małgorzata Chmiel	Alicja Chybicka; Janusz Cichoń; Piotr Cieśliński; Tomasz Cimoszewicz; Zofia Czernow; Andrzej Czerwiński; Katarzyna Lubnauer; Jerzy Meysztowicz; Krzysztof Mieszkowski; Mirosław Pampuch; Ewa Drozd; Artur Dunin; Waldy Dzikowski; Joanna Fabisiak; Joanna Frydrych; Marek Wójcik; Marian Zembala; Wojciech Ziemniak; Szymon Ziółkowski; Robert Tyszkiewicz; Sławomir Nitras; Tomasz Nowak; Mirosława Nykiel; Włodzimierz Nykiel; Norbert Obrycki; Marzena Okła-Drewnowicz; Paweł Olszewski; Katarzyna Osos; Grzegorz Furgo; Krzysztof Gadowski; Kinga Gajewska; Elżbieta Gapińska; Zdzisław Gawlik; Stanisław Gawłowski; Lidia Gądek; Marek Sowa; Michał Jaros; Elżbieta Gelert; Artur Gierada	Tomasz Głogowski; Marta Golbik; Cezary Grabarczyk; Jan Grabiec; Danuta Pietraszewska; Teresa Piotrowska; Adam Szłapka; Witold Zembaczyński; Grzegorz Raniewicz; Ireneusz Raś; Halina Rozpondek; Leszek Ruszczyk; Dorota Rutkowska; Jakub Rutnicki; Marek Rząsa; Grzegorz Schetyna; Krystyna Sibińska; Kazimierz Plocke; Agnieszka Pomaska; Jacek Protas; Elżbieta Radziszewska; Rafał Grupiński; Andrzej Halicki; Agnieszka Hanajczyk; Bożena Henczyca; Jolanta Hibner; Marek Hok; Maria Janyska; Bożena Kamińska; Włodzimierz Karpiński; Małgorzata Kidawa-Błońska; Marcin Kierwiński; Joanna Kluzik-Rostkowska
Kukiz'15
Piotr Apel; Józef Brynkus; Barbara Chrobak; Grzegorz Długi; Paweł Grabowski; Paweł Szramka; Stanisław Tyszka	Błażej Parda; Andrzej Kobylarz; Maciej Masłowski; Jarosław Sachajko; Robert Mordak; Agnieszka Ścigaj; Stefan Romecki	Łukasz Rzepecki; Paweł Kukiz	
Koalicja Polska – PSL
Paweł Bejda; Krystian Jarubas; Michał Mazowiecki; Marek Biernacki; Radosław Lubczyk; Zbigniew Sosnowski; Stefan Niesiołowski	Mieczysław Kasprzak; Eugeniusz Kłopotek; Piotr Walkowski; Jacek Tomczak; Marek Sawicki; Jacek Protasiewicz; Władysław Kosiniak-Kamysz	Kazimierz Kotowski; Krzysztof Paszyk; Piotr Zgorzelski; Jan Łopata; Mirosław Maliszewski; Michał Kamiński; Urszula Pasławska	Genowefa Tokarska
Real Politics Union
Elżbieta Zielińska	Tomasz Jaskóła	Bartosz Józwiak	Jerzy Kozłowski
Return Law
Jerzy Jachnik	Janusz Sanocki	Piotr Liroy-Marzec	
Now!
Joanna Schmidt	Joanna Scheuring-Wielgus	Ryszard Petru	
Confederation Freedom and Independence
Jacek Wilk	Jakub Kulesza	Paweł Skutecki	Robert Winnicki
Unaffiliated
Magdalena Błeńska; Ryszard Galla; Marek Ruciński	Marek Jakubiak; Stanisław Pięta; Adam Andruszkiewicz	Jan Klawiter; Piotr Babiarz; Andrzej Maciejewski	Robert Majka; Jarosław Porwich; Edyta Kubik

== See also ==
- 2015 Polish parliamentary election
- List of Polish senators (2015–2019)
- List of Sejm members (2011–15), former term
