= Artur Szałabawka =

Polish politician and civil servant (born 1967)

- Szałabawka in 2015.

Member of the Sejm of Poland
- Incumbent
- Assumed office 12 November 2015
- Constituency: No. 41

Member of the Szczecin City Council
- In office 25 October 2005 – 27 October 2015
- Constituency: No. 2

Chairperson of the Szczecin City Council
- In office 8 December 2014 – 27 October 2015
- Preceded by: Jan Stopyra
- Succeeded by: Łukasz Tyszler

Personal details
- Born: 3 October 1963 (age 63) Szczecin, Poland
- Party: Law and Justice
- Children: 2
- Parent: Mirosława Masłowska (mother)
- Education: University of Szczecin
- Occupation: Politician, civil servant
- Police career
- Department: Szczecin City Guard
- Service years: 1994–1998
- Rank: Inspector

Artur Lesław Szałabawka (Polish: [ˈar.tur ˈlɛ.swaf ʂa.waˈbaf.ka]; born 3 October 1967) is a Polish politician and civil servant. Since 2015, he is a member of the Sejm of Poland, representing the constituency no. 41, consisting of the western portion of West Pomeranian Voivodeship. From 2005 to 2015, he was a member of the Szczecin City Council, serving as its chairperson from 2014 to 2015. He belongs to the Law and Justice party.

== Biography ==
Artur Szałabawka was born on 3 October 1967 in the city of Szczecin, located in West Pomeranian Voivodeship, Poland. His is a son of Mirosława Masłowska (1943–2023), a physician and politician, who was a member of the Sejm of Poland from 2005 to 2011. He has a sister. Szałabawka finished the Nicolaus Copernicus 3rd General Education High School in Szczecin, and in 2001, he graduated from the University of Szczecin with a master's degree in sociology. He worked in the company Żegluga Szczecińska in Szczecin from 1989 to 1990, and later for in a Mercamadrid supermarket in Madrid, Spain from 1991 to 1994. From 1994 to 1998, he was an officer in the Szczecin City Guard, with a rank of an inspector. From 1998 to 2006, he worked in the Szczecin Town Hall, where from 2004, he was a deputy director of the Department of Health and Social Policy. From 2006 to 2015, Szałabawka was also a voivodeship commander of the West Pomeranian Voivodeship division of the Voluntary Labour Corps, a hierarchical service operating as a state budget unit.

Szałabawka was a member of the Movement for the Reconstruction of Poland, and in 2001, he joined the Law and Justice. He unsuccessfully run for a seat in the Sejm in the 2001 and 2011. He was a candidate in the constituency no. 41, consisting of the western portion of West Pomeranian Voivodeship, and received 452 (0.13%) and 3,217 (0.84%) votes. He also unsuccessfully run for a seat in the Szczecin City Council in the 2002 election, from the constituency no. 2, receiving 342 votes (1.63%). He was later appointed to the council in 2005, as a replacement for Arkadiusz Litwiński. He was re-elected in 2006, 2010, and 2014, receiving 1,918 (6.59%), 2,140 (8.81%), and 2,432 (11.40%). He was a chairperson of the city council from 2014 to 2015. In 2014, he also unsuccessfully run for the office of the city mayor, receiving 14,218 votes (13.16%).

Szałabawka was elected to the Sejm in the 2015 election, receiving 7,024 votes (1.85%). Subsequently, he resigned from the Szczecin City Council. He was re-elected to the Sejm in 2019 and 2023, receiving 11,346 (2.41%) and 15,446 (2.79%) votes, respectively. In the 2024 election, he unsuccessfully run for a seat in the European Parliament from the constituency no. 13, consisting of Lubusz and West Pomeranian Voivodeships.

Szałabawka was also a member of the Political Council of the Law and Justice, and the presidium of the West Pomeranian Voivodeship division of the party. He was also a member of the Volunteer Fire Service in Szczecin, a volunteer fire department, in its scuba diving division.

== Personal life ==
Szałabawka has a wife and two daughters. He resides in the city of Szczecin in West Pomeranian Voivodeship, Poland. His daughter Julia Szałabawka is a councillor in Szczecin, being elected in 2024.

== Electoral results ==
Year	Office		Party	Constituency	Votes			Result	Ref.
Year	Office		Party	Constituency	Total	%	P.	Result	Ref.
2001	Sejm of Poland	4th	Law and Justice	No. 41	452	0.13	100th	Lost	
2002	Szczecin City Council	4th	Civic Platform and Law and Justice	No. 2	342	1.63	15th	Lost	
2006	Szczecin City Council	5th	Law and Justice	No. 2	1,918	6.59	3rd	Won	
2010	Szczecin City Council	6th	Law and Justice	No. 2	2,140	8.81	2nd	Won	
2011	Sejm of Poland	7th	Law and Justice	No. 41	3,217	0.84	19th	Lost	
2014	Mayor of Szczecin	10th	Law and Justice	—N/a	14,218	13.16	3rd	Lost	
2014	Szczecin City Council	7th	Law and Justice	No. 2	2,432	11.40	2nd	Won	
2015	Sejm of Poland	8th	Law and Justice	No. 41	7,024	1.85	13th	Won	
2019	Sejm of Poland	9th	Law and Justice	No. 41	11,346	2.41	11th	Won	
2023	Sejm of Poland	9th	Law and Justice	No. 41	15,446	2.79	7th	Won	
2024	European Parliament	10th	Law and Justice	No. 13	4,070	0.54	20th	Lost	
