= Jarosław Rzepa =

Polish politician, civil servant, and botanist (born 1972)

- Sikora in 2019.

Member of the Sejm of Poland
- Incumbent
- Assumed office 12 November 2019
- Constituency: No. 41

Member of the West Pomeranian Voivodeship Board
- In office 1 January 2013 – 18 October 2019

Deputy voivodeship marshal of West Pomeranian Voivodeship
- In office 1 December 2014 – 18 October 2019 Serving with Tomasz Sobieraj
- Preceded by: Andrzej Jakubowski; Wojciech Drożdż
- Succeeded by: Olgierd Kustosz

Member of the West Pomeranian Voivodeship Sejmik
- In office 26 November 2014 – 16 November 2018
- Constituency: No. 2

Personal details
- Born: 22 August 1972 (age 54) Szamotuły, Poland
- Party: Polish People's Party
- Children: 1
- Education: Adam Mickiewicz University in Poznań; Agricultural University of Kraków; Agricultural University of Szczecin
- Occupation: Politician, civil servant, botanist

Jarosław Michał Rzepa (Polish: [jaˈrɔ.swaf ˈmi.xaw ˈʐɛ.pa]; born 22 August 1972) is a Polish politician, civil servant, and botanist. Since 2023, he is a member of the Sejm of Poland, representing the constituency no. 41, which consists of the western portion of the West Pomeranian Voivodeship. From 2014 to 2018, he was a member of the West Pomeranian Voivodeship Sejmik. Additionally, he was also a member of the West Pomeranian Voivodeship Board from 2013 to 2019, and the deputy voivodeship marshal of West Pomeranian Voivodeship from 2014 to 2019. Rzepa is a member of the Polish People's Party.

== Early life and education ==
Jarosław Rzepa was born on 22 August 1972, in the town of Szamotuły, located in Greater Poland Voivodeship, Poland. He is a son of Marian and Jadwiga Rzepa, and a grandson of Jan Rzepa (1899–2005), a lieutenant in the Polish Armed Forces, and a veteran of the First World War, the Greater Poland Uprising, the Polish–Soviet War, and the Second World War.

Rzepa graduated from the gardening vocational school in the village of Stara Łubianka. In 1997, Rzepa graduated from the Agricultural University of Szczecin with a degree in gardening, with a specialisation in ornamental plants, and from the Adam Mickiewicz University in Poznań, with a degree in biology. In 2000, Rzepa received a postgraduate degree in plant breeding and seed production from the Agricultural University of Kraków, and in 2007, he received a doctorate degree in botany from the Agricultural University of Szczecin.

== Career ==
From 1997 to 2008, Rzepa worked in the Experimental Plant Variety Testing Facility in Szczecin. Afterwards, he worked in the West Pomeranian Voivodeship Marshal Office in Szczecin, being a director of the Department of Agriculture and Environmental Protection from 2008 to 2011, and of the Department of Agriculture and Fisheries from 2011 to 2012.

In 2002, Rzepa joined the Polish People's Party. In 2008, he became a deputy chairperson of the municipal board of directors of Szczecin. In 2011, Rzepa became a board member of the Chief Council of the Polish People's Party, and the chairperson of its board of director of the West Pomeranian Voivodeship division. A year later, he also joined the Chief Executive Committee of the Polish People's Party. During the 2010 elections, Rzepa unsuccessfully run for a seat in the West Pomeranian Voivodeship Sejmik, from the constituency no. 1, receiving 545 votes (0.4%). On 1 January 2013, he was appointed as a member of the West Pomeranian Voivodeship Board, serving until 18 October 2019. Rzepa was later elected to the West Pomeranian Voivodeship Sejmik in the 2014 election from the constituency no. 2, receiving 4,103 votes (5.09%). From 1 December 2014 to 18 October 2019, he was the deputy voivodeship marshal of West Pomeranian Voivodeship, serving together with Tomasz Sobieraj. In the 2015 election, Rzepa unsuccessfully run for a seat in the Sejm of Poland, from the constituency no. 41, which consists of the western portion of the West Pomeranian Voivodeship, receiving 3,063 votes (0.8%). He also unsuccessfully run for the re-election to the West Pomeranian Voivodeship Sejmik in 2018, from the constituency no. 2, receiving 6,565 votes (6.47%).

During the 2019 election, Rzepa unsuccessfully run for a seat in the European Parliament from the No. 13, consisting of Lubusz and West Pomeranian Voivodeships. He was a candidate of the European Coalition electoral alliance and received 10,461 votes (1.19%). Later the same year, he was elected in the parliamentary election to the Sejm, from the constituency no. 41, receiving 12,622 votes (2.68%). Rzepa was re-elected in the 2023 election from an electoral list of the Third Way electoral alliance, receiving 21,309 votes (3.84%). The same year, he also declined to replace Bartosz Arłukowicz in the European Parliament, who resigned on 13 November 2023. In the 2024 election, Rzepa unsuccessfully run for a seat in the European Parliament, from the constituency no. 13. He run from an electoral list of the Third Way, and received 6,500 votes (0.86%).

In November 2025, Rzepa became a deputy chairperson of the Popular Sports Teams, an association of sports club in Poland.

== Personal life ==
Rzepa has a wife and a daughter. He resides in the village of Wierzchosław in West Pomeranian Voivodeship, Poland.

== Electoral results ==
Year	Office		Party	Constituency	Votes			Result	Ref.
Year	Office		Party	Constituency	Total	%	P.	Result	Ref.
2010	West Pomeranian Voivodeship Sejmik	3rd	Polish People's Party	No. 1	545	0.40	34th	Lost	
2014	West Pomeranian Voivodeship Sejmik	4th	Polish People's Party	No. 2	4,103	5.09	5th	Won	
2015	Sejm of Poland	8th	Polish People's Party	No. 41	3,063	0.80	28th	Lost	
2018	West Pomeranian Voivodeship Sejmik	5th	Polish People's Party	No. 2	6,565	6.47	4th	Lost	
2019	European Parliament	9th	European Coalition	No. 13	10,461	1.19	11th	Lost	
2019	Sejm of Poland	9th	Polish People's Party	No. 41	12,622	2.68	7th	Won	
2023	Sejm of Poland	10th	Third Way	No. 41	21,309	3.84	6th	Won	
2024	European Parliament	10th	Third Way	No. 13	6,500	0.86	15th	Lost	
