= Sejm Constituency no. 26 =

Polish parliamentary constituency

Słupsk
- Polish: Okręg wyborczy Słupsk
- Constituency for the National Assembly of the Republic of Poland
- Boundary of the Słupsk Constituency in Poland for the 2019 general election.
- Counties in Pomeranian Voivodeship: Bytów, Chojnice, Człuchów, Kartuzy, Kościerzyna, Lębork, Puck, Słupsk, and Wejherowo
- City Counties in Pomeranian Voivodeship: Gdynia and Słupsk

Current constituency
- Sejm Deputies: 14
- Sejm District: 26
- European Parliament constituency: Pomeranian
- Voivodeship sejmik: Pomeranian Regional Assembly

Słupsk is a Polish parliamentary constituency in the Pomeranian Voivodeship. It elects fourteen members of the Sejm.

The district has the number '26' for elections to the Sejm and is named after the city of Słupsk. It includes the counties of Bytów, Chojnice, Człuchów, Kartuzy, Kościerzyna, Lębork, Puck, Słupsk, and Wejherowo, and the city counties of Gdynia and Słupsk.

== List of members ==
=== 2023-2027 ===
Member	Party
Agnieszka Dziemianowicz-Bąk	New Left
Barbara Nowacka	Polish Initiative
Rafał Siemaszko	Civic Coalition
Stanisław Lamczyk	Civic Coalition
Zbigniew Konwiński	Civic Coalition
Henryka Krzywonos-Strycharska	Civic Coalition
Kazimierz Plocke	Civic Coalition
Wioleta Tomczak	Poland 2050
Marek Biernacki	Polish People's Party
Marcin Horała	Law and Justice
Piotr Müller	Law and Justice
Dorota Arciszewska-Mielewczyk	Law and Justice
Aleksander Mrówczyński	Law and Justice
Stanisław Tyszka	Confederation
