= Sejm Constituency no. 41 =

Polish parliamentary constituency

Sejm Constituency no. 41 Szczecin
- Okręg wyborczy nr 41; Sczecin
- Constituency for the Sejm
- Location within Poland.
- Counties: Szczecin, Świnoujście, Goleniów, Gryfice, Gryfino, Kamień, Łobez, Myślibórz, Police, Pyrzyce, Stargard
- Voivodeship: West Pomeranian

Current constituency
- Created: 2001
- Deputies: 12
- Regional assembly: West Pomeranian Voivodeship Sejmik
- Senate constituency: No. 97 and 98
- EP constituency: Lubusz and West Pomeranian

Sejm Constituency no. 41 (Polish: Okręg wyborczy nr 41) is a constituency of the Sejm in the West Pomeranian Voivodeship, which elects twelve deputies. Its seat is located in the city of Szczecin. It consists of the city counties of Szczecin and Świnoujście, as well as land counties of Goleniów, Gryfice, Gryfino, Kamień, Łobez, Myślibórz, Police, Pyrzyce and Stargard. Constituency Electoral Commission's seat is the city of Szczecin.

== Elections ==
=== 2023 ===
2023 parliamentary election: Szczecin
| Party | Votes | % | Seats |
|---|---|---|---|
| Civic Coalition | 222,427 | 40.13 | 6 |
| Law and Justice | 159,575 | 28.79 | 4 |
| Third Way | 69,957 | 12.62 | 1 |
| The Left | 52,032 | 9.39 | 1 |
| Confederation | 32,942 | 5.94 | – |
| Nonpartisan Local Government Activists | 8,985 | 1.62 | – |
| There is One Poland | 6,218 | 1.12 | – |
| Welfare and Peace Movement | 2,172 | 0.39 | – |
| Total | 554,308 | 100.00 | 12 |
| Valid votes | 554,308 | 98.15 | |
| Invalid/blank votes | 10,427 | 1.85 | |
| Total votes | 564,735 | 100.00 | |
| Registered voters/turnout | 771,809 | 73.17 | |
Source: National Electoral Commission

== List of deputies ==
Deputies of the 9th Sejm (2019–2023)
| Deputy | Party |
|---|---|
| Leszek Dobrzyński | Law and Justice |
| Marek Gróbarczyk | Law and Justice |
| Michał Jach | Law and Justice |
| Artur Szałabawka | Law and Justice |
| Katarzyna Kotula | New Left (Note: Member of The Left parliamentary group.) |
| Dariusz Wieczorek | New Left |
| Magdalena Filiks | Civic Platform (Note: Member of the Civic Coalition parliamentary group.) |
| Artur Łącki | Civic Platform |
| Arkadiusz Marchewka | Civic Platform |
| Sławomir Nitras | Civic Platform |
| Grzegorz Napieralski | Polish Initiative |
| Jarosław Rzepa | Polish People's Party (Note: Member of the Polish Coalition parliamentary group.) |
