= Rzepa =

Rzepa (Polish pronunciation: [ʐɛpa]) is a Polish surname.

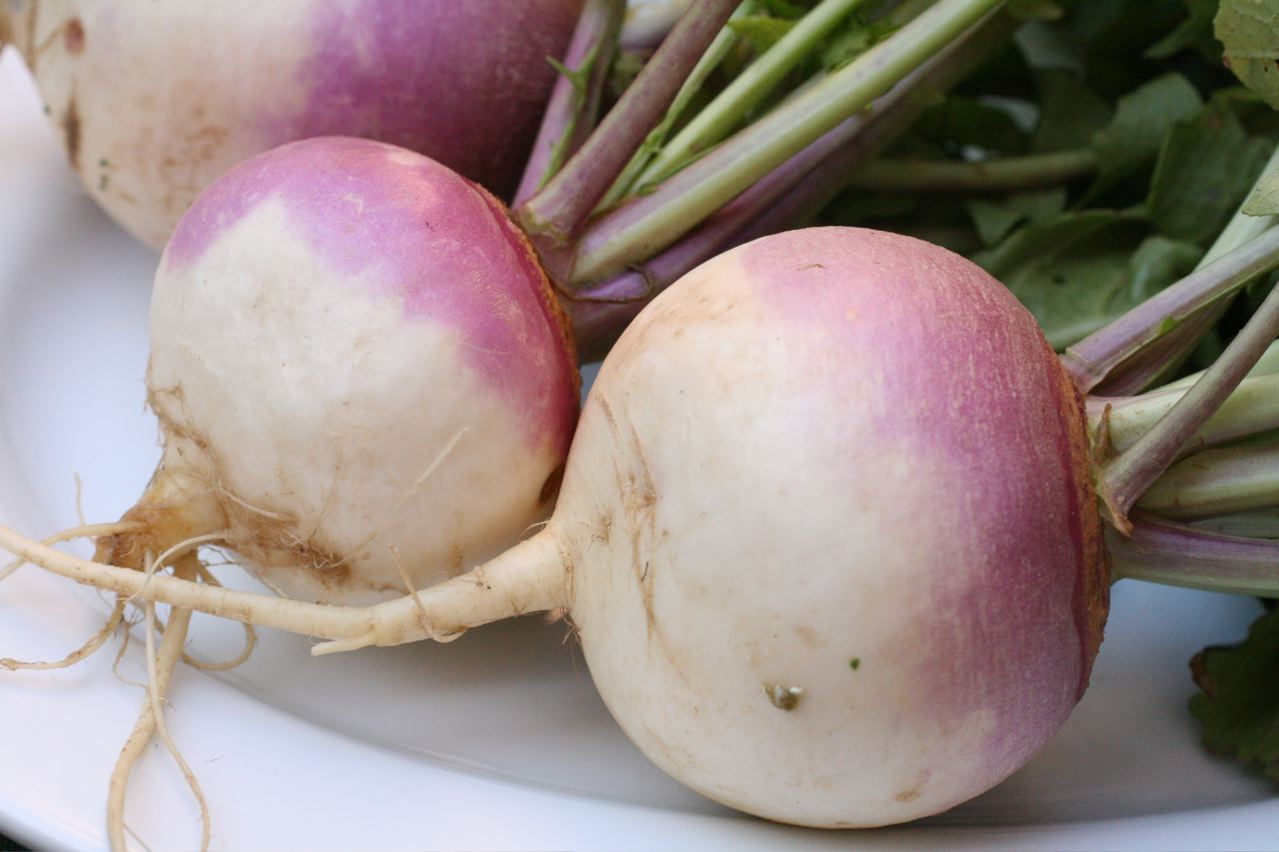
Turnip

== Meaning and origin ==
The name derives from rzepa, a Polish word meaning turnip.

== Notable people ==
Notable people with this name include:

- Henry Rzepa (born 1950), British chemist
- Jarosław Rzepa (bron 1972), Polish politician, civil servant, and botanist
- Karolina Rzepa (born 1992), Polish actress
- Miroslaw Rzepa (born 1968), Polish footballer

== See also ==
- Rzepka
- Žepa
