= Jan Kilian =

Jan Kilian is the name of:

- Jan Kilian (pastor), Prussian-American pastor
- Jan Kilian (politician), Polish politician
