= Mulawa =

Mulawa may refer to:

- Mulawa Correctional Centre, a correctional facility in Australia
- Mulawa, Uganda, a neighborhood in Kira Town, Wakiso District, Uganda.
- Krzysztof Mulawa (born 1985), Polish politician
