= Tomasz Jaskóła =

Polish politician and educator (born 1974)

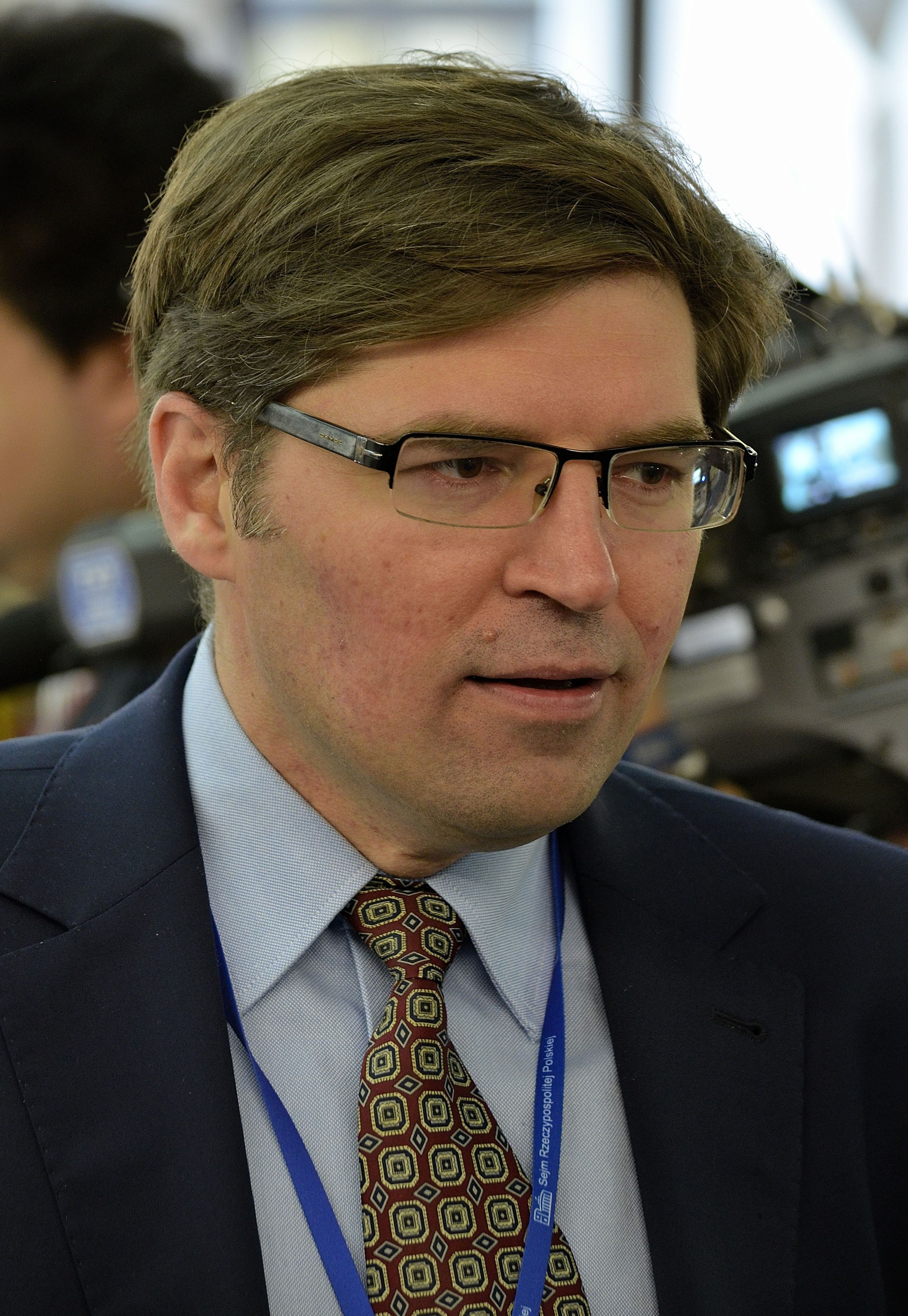
- Jaskóła in 2015

member of Sejm 2015–2019
- In office 2015–2019

Personal details
- Born: 31 July 1974 (age 52) Częstochowa, Poland
- Party: Poland Together (2014-2015), The Republicans (2015)
- Education: Jan Długosz University

Tomasz Janusz Jaskóła (born 31 July 1974) is a Polish politician and educator. Member of the Sejm (2015–2019).

== Biography ==
Born 31 July 1974, in Częstochowa, he graduated from the Jan Długosz University. He belonged to the Poland Together (2014–2015) and The Republicans (2015).

In 2014, he unsuccessfully applied for the Silesian Regional Assembly from the KWW Independent Self-government of the Silesian Voivodeship. He started to the Sejm in the 28 Częstochowa district from the first place from Kukiz'15, organized by Paweł Kukiz. He obtained the mandate of the 8th term of Sejm, receiving 10,952 votes. In the local elections in 2018 he became the candidate of Kukiz'15 for the presidency of Częstochowa. He received 5.27% of votes and he did not get a choice for this function. He also ran unsuccessfully in the European Parliament election in 2019. In August 2019, he left the Kukiz'15 parliamentary club, co-creating the parliamentary association of the Real Politics Union. He did not apply for a parliamentary re-election in 2019.
