= Wioleta Tomczak =

Polish politician (born 1988)

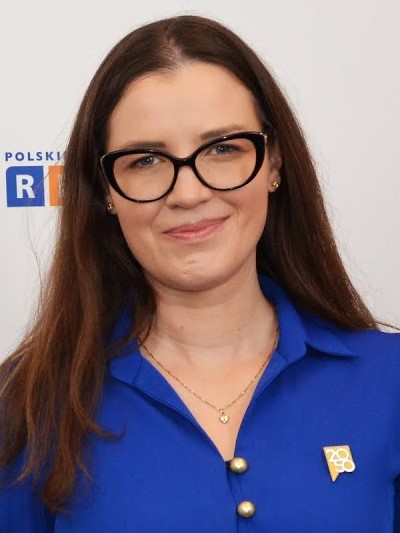

Member of the Sejm
- Incumbent
- Assumed office 12 November 2023
- Constituency: Słupsk

Personal details
- Born: Wioleta Barbara Szkaradkiewicz; 21 April 1988 (age 37)
- Party: Poland 2050
- Other political affiliations: Third Way

Wioleta Barbara Tomczak (née Szkaradkiewicz; born 21 April 1988) is a Polish politician of Poland 2050 who was elected member of the Sejm in the 2023 parliamentary election. In the 2024 European Parliament election, she was the lead candidate of the Third Way in Pomerania.
