= Arkadiusz Marchewka =

Polish politician and deputy (born 1986)

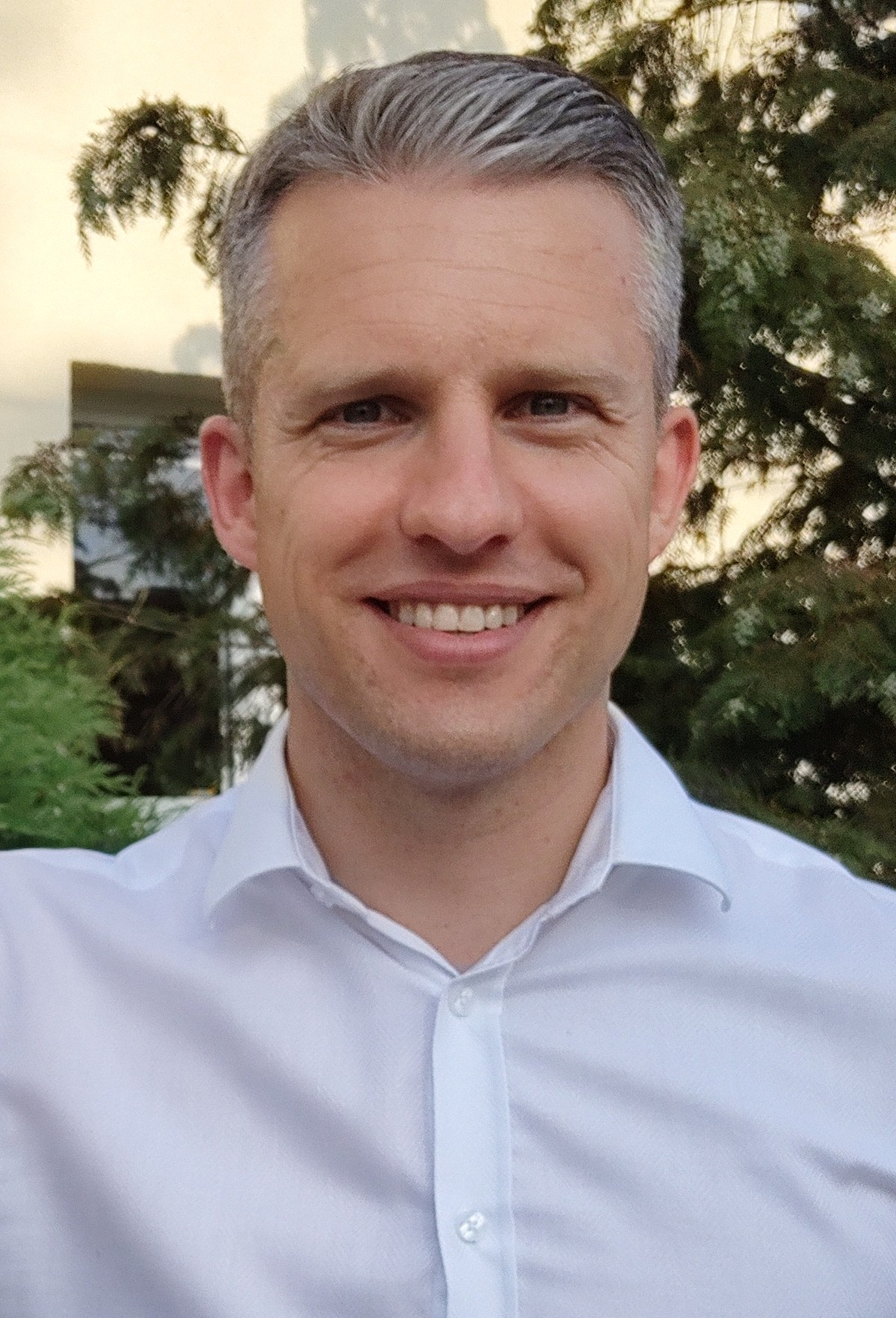
- Marchewka in 2021

Member of Sejm
- Incumbent
- Assumed office 12 November 2015

Deputy Minister of Infrastructure
- Incumbent
- Assumed office 13 December 2023

Personal details
- Born: 18 January 1986 (age 40) Szczecin
- Party: Civic Platform
- Education: University of Szczecin

Arkadiusz Marchewka (born 18 January 1986) is a Polish politician, member of Sejm of the 8th and 9th legislature.

== Early life and education ==
Arkadiusz Marchewka was born in 1986 in Szczecin. He graduated International Relations at the University of Szczecin in 2010 and in 2009 Management at the Faculty of Economics of the West Pomeranian University of Technology. At the University of Szczecin, based on the Oddziaływanie bezpośrednich inwestycji zagranicznych na rynek pracy województwa zachodniopomorskiego, he obtained a PhD of economics.

== Political career ==
He became involved in political activities within the framework of the Civic Platform. In 2007, he was elected to the Niebuszewo estate council. He was an assistant to the deputy marshal of the West Pomeranian Voivodeship– Witold Jabłoński, then employed in the marshal's office. Later, he started working as a manager in the Polskie Terminale company.

In 2010 and 2014, he was elected to the Szczecin City Council. He was the vice-president of the city council.

=== Parliamentarian ===
In the parliamentary election in 2015, he ran for the Sejm mandate from the Civic Platform list. He obtained the mandate of the MP of the 8th legislature, receiving 7147 votes. In the Sejm of the 8th legislature, he became a member of the Committee on Economy and Development, the Committee on Maritime Economy and Inland Navigation as well as the Committee on Digitization, Innovation and Modern Technologies. In April 2018, he became the president of the Civic Platform structures in the West Pomeranian Voivodeship.

In the elections in 2019, he successfully applied for a parliamentary reelection, from Civic Coalition list, receiving 30 047 votes. In the Sejm of the 9th legislature he became vice-chairman of the Maritime Economy and Inland Navigation Committee, member of the Digitization, Innovation and Modern Technologies Committee and Public Finance Committee, vice-chairman of the Polish-Swedish Parliamentary Group and chairman of the West Pomeranian Parliamentary Team
