= Sejm Constituency no. 18 =

Polish parliamentary constituency

Coordinates: 52°09′00″N 22°16′00″E

Siedlce
- Polish: Okręg wyborczy Siedlce
- Constituency for the National Assembly of the Republic of Poland
- Boundary of the Siedlce Constituency in Poland for the 2011 general election.
- Counties in Masovian Voivodeship: Garwolin, Łosice, Maków, Mińsk, Ostrołęka, Ostrów, Pułtusk, Siedlce, Sokołów, Węgrów, and Wyszków
- City Counties in Masovian Voivodeship: Ostrołęka and Siedlce

Current constituency
- Sejm Deputies: 12
- Sejm District: 18
- European Parliament constituency: Masovian
- Voivodeship sejmik: Masovian Regional Assembly

Siedlce is a Polish parliamentary constituency in the Masovian Voivodeship. It elects twelve members of the Sejm.

The district has the number '18' for elections to the Sejm and is named after the city of Siedlce. It includes the counties of Garwolin, Łosice, Maków, Mińsk, Ostrołęka, Ostrów, Pułtusk, Siedlce, Sokołów, Węgrów, and Wyszków, and the city counties of Ostrołęka and Siedlce.

== List of members ==
=== 2023-2027 ===
Member	Party
Maria Koc	Law and Justice
Daniel Milewski	Law and Justice
Henryk Kowalczyk	Law and Justice
Krzysztof Tchórzewski	Law and Justice
Arkadiusz Czartoryski	Law and Justice
Marcin Grabowski	Law and Justice
Grzegorz Woźniak	Law and Justice
Czesław Mroczek	Civic Coalition
Mariusz Popielarz	Civic Coalition
Marek Sawicki	Third Way
Żaneta Cwalina-Śliwowska	Third Way
Krzysztof Mulawa	Confederation

=== 2019-2023 ===
Member	Party
Arkadiusz Czartoryski	Law and Justice
Kamila Gasiuk-Pihowicz	Civic Coalition
Maciej Górski	Law and Justice
Henryk Kowalczyk	Law and Justice
Daniel Milewski	Law and Justice
Czesław Mroczek	Civic Coalition
Marek Sawicki	Polish People's Party
Anna Maria Siarkowska	Law and Justice
Krzysztof Tchórzewski	Law and Justice
Teresa Wargocka	Law and Justice
Grzegorz Woźniak	Law and Justice
Marek Zagórski	Law and Justice
