= Dorota Arciszewska-Mielewczyk =

Polish politician (born 1968)

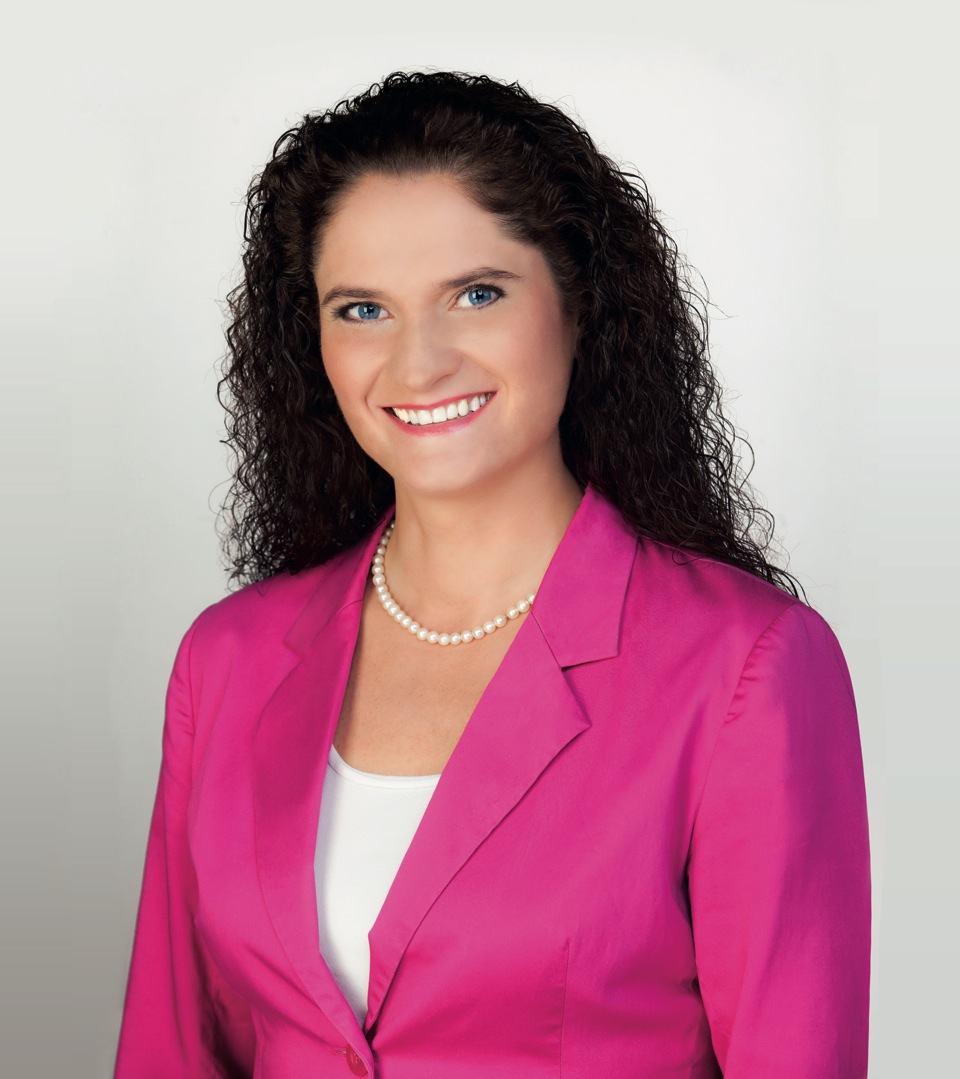
- Arciszewska-Mielewczyk in 2011

Member of the Sejm
- Incumbent
- Assumed office 13 November 2023
- Constituency: Słupsk
- In office 8 November 2011 – 11 November 2019
- Constituency: Słupsk
- In office 20 October 1997 – 18 October 2005
- Constituency: Gdańsk (1997–2001); Słupsk (2001–2005)

Member of the Senate
- In office 19 October 2005 – 7 November 2011
- Constituency: Gdynia

Personal details
- Born: 16 February 1968 (age 58)
- Party: Law and Justice (since 2004)

Dorota Arciszewska-Mielewczyk (born 16 February 1968) is a Polish politician. She has been a member of the Sejm since 2023, having previously served from 1997 to 2005 and from 2011 to 2019. From 2005 to 2011, she was a member of the Senate.
