= Arkadiusz Czartoryski =

Polish politician (born 1966)

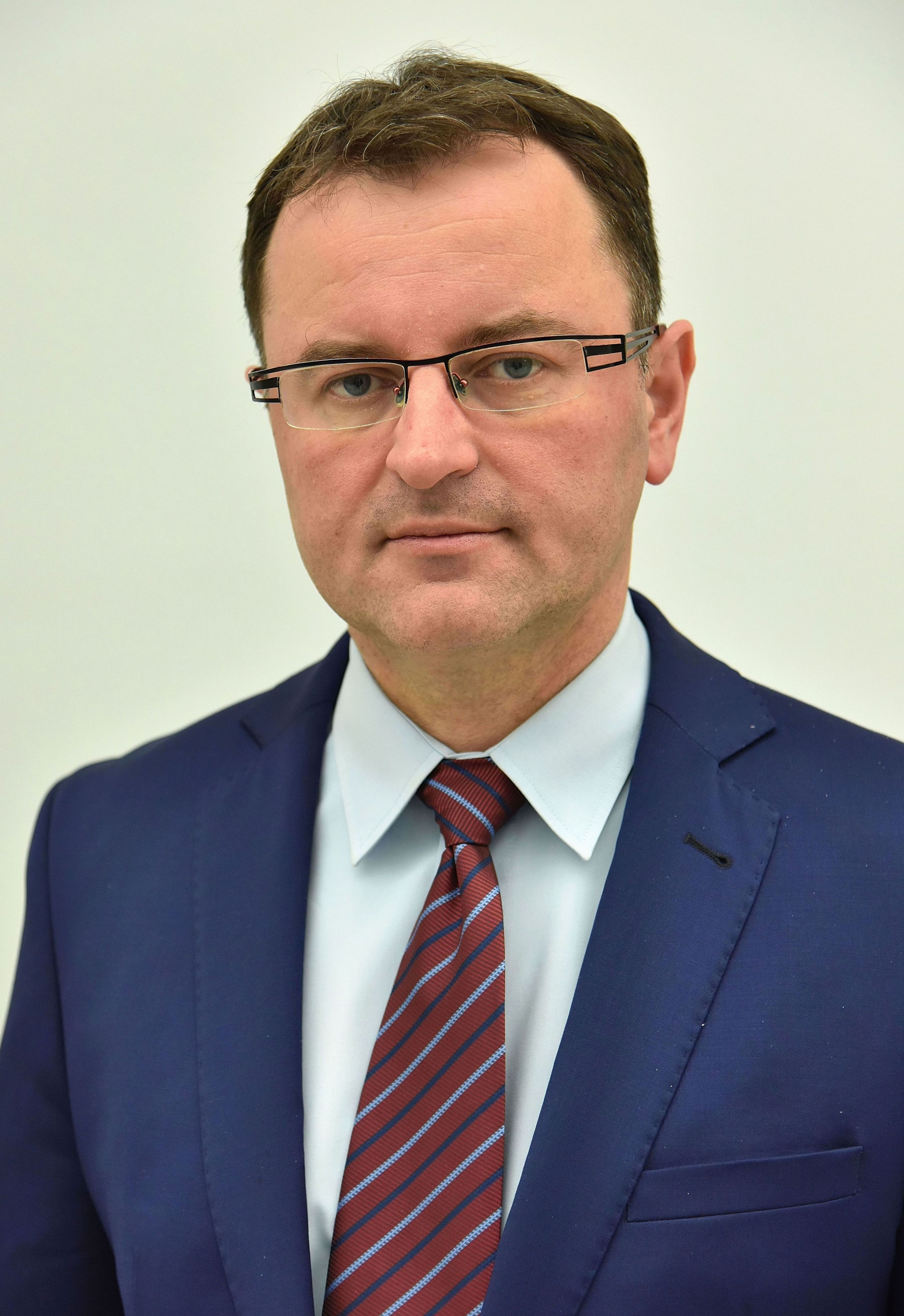

Member of the Sejm
- Incumbent
- Assumed office 25 September 2005
- Constituency: 18 – Siedlce

Personal details
- Born: 14 April 1966 (age 59) Ostrołęka
- Party: Law and Justice

Arkadiusz Czartoryski (born 14 April 1966) is a Polish politician. He was elected to the Sejm on 25 September 2005, getting 14,753 votes in 18 Siedlce district as a candidate from the Law and Justice list.

Czartoryski has served in the Sejm for five terms and has been serving previously as the deputy minister of internal affairs and administration.

== See also ==
- Members of Polish Sejm 2005-2007
