= Marcin Horała =

Polish politician and lawyer

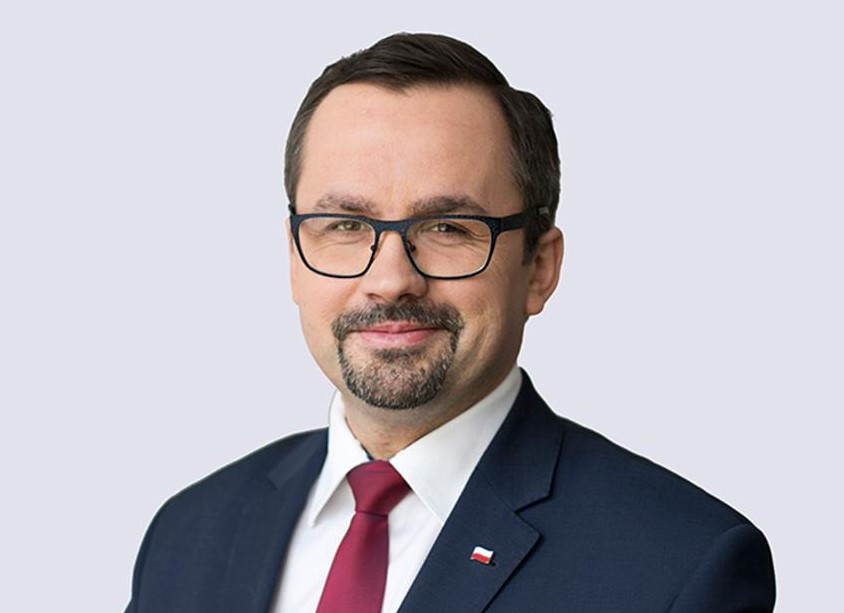

Deputy Marshal of the Sejm
- Incumbent
- Assumed office 18 September 2026
- Marshal: Włodzimierz Czarzasty

Member of the Sejm VIII, IX, and X terms
- Incumbent
- Assumed office 12 November 2019

Deputy Minister of Infrastructure
- In office 2022–2023

Deputy Minister of Funds and Regional Policy

Personal details
- Born: October 2, 1981 (age 45) Gdańsk, Poland
- Party: Law and Justice
- Education: University of Gdańsk
- Occupation: Politician, lawyer, political scientist

Marcin Horała (born October 2, 1981 in Gdańsk) is a Polish politician and lawyer, Member of the Sejm for the VIII, IX, and X terms. From 2019 to 2023, he was the government plenipotentiary for the Central Communication Port, from 2019 to 2022 the Secretary of State in the Ministry of Infrastructure, and from 2022 to 2023 the Secretary of State in the Ministry of Development Funds and Regional Policy.

== Political career ==
In 2002, he unsuccessfully ran for the Gdynia City Council from the KWW Naprzód Gdynio! – Lista Prawicowa. He was a member of the Real Politics Union and in the 2004 European Parliament elections, he ran unsuccessfully from the UPR list. That same year, he joined Law and Justice. He was a district councilor of Chylonia. In the 2006, 2010, and 2014 elections, he was elected as a councilor of Gdynia. In 2014, he also ran unsuccessfully for the city's mayor.

In the 2011 parliamentary elections, he ran unsuccessfully for the Sejm from the PiS list. In the 2015 elections, he ran again for the Sejm in the Gdynia electoral district and won a seat in the VIII term.

On July 20, 2018, he became the chairman of the VAT fraud investigation committee. In 2018, he ran again for the mayor of Gdynia.

In the 2019 elections, he was re-elected to the Sejm.

In November 2019, he was appointed as Secretary of State in the Ministry of Infrastructure.

In April 2022, he was additionally appointed as Secretary of State in the Ministry of Funds and Regional Policy. In July of that year, he left the Ministry of Infrastructure.

In the 2023 elections, he was re-elected to the Sejm for the third consecutive term. In December of the same year, he ended his tenure in government administration.

In 2024, he ran unsuccessfully in the European Parliament elections.

== See also ==
- List of Sejm members (2015–2019)
- List of Sejm members (2019–2023)
- List of Sejm members (2023–2027)
