= Joanna Frydrych =

Polish politician (born 1978)

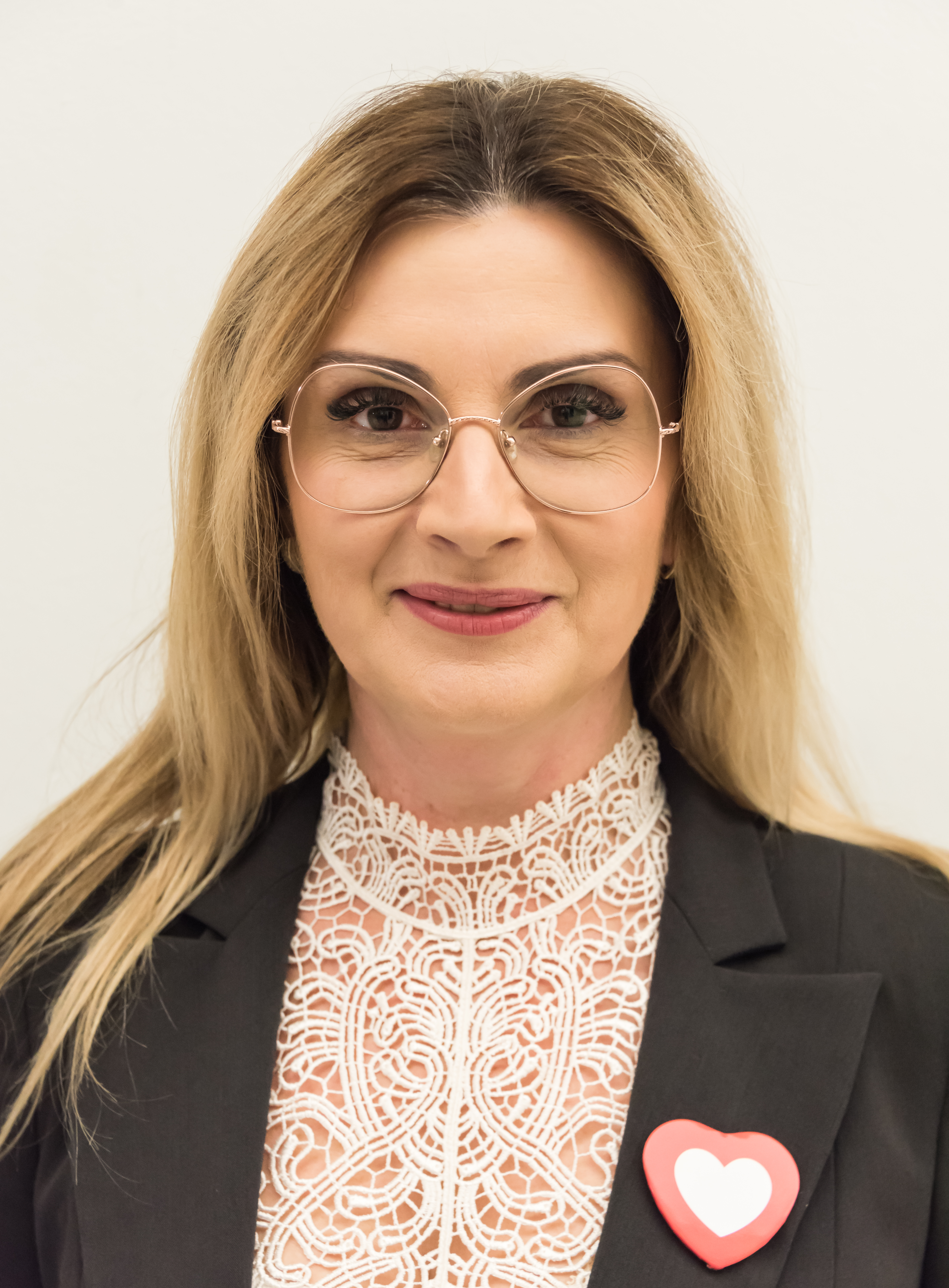

Member of the Sejm
- Incumbent
- Assumed office 12 November 2015

Personal details
- Born: 13 January 1978 (age 48) Krosno
- Party: Civic Platform

Joanna Zofia Frydrych (born 13 January 1978) is a Polish politician where she was elected to the Sejm in 2015, 2019 and 2023.

== Personal life ==
Graduated from the University of Information Technology and Management in 2003.
