= Arkadiusz Myrcha =

Polish politician (born 1984)

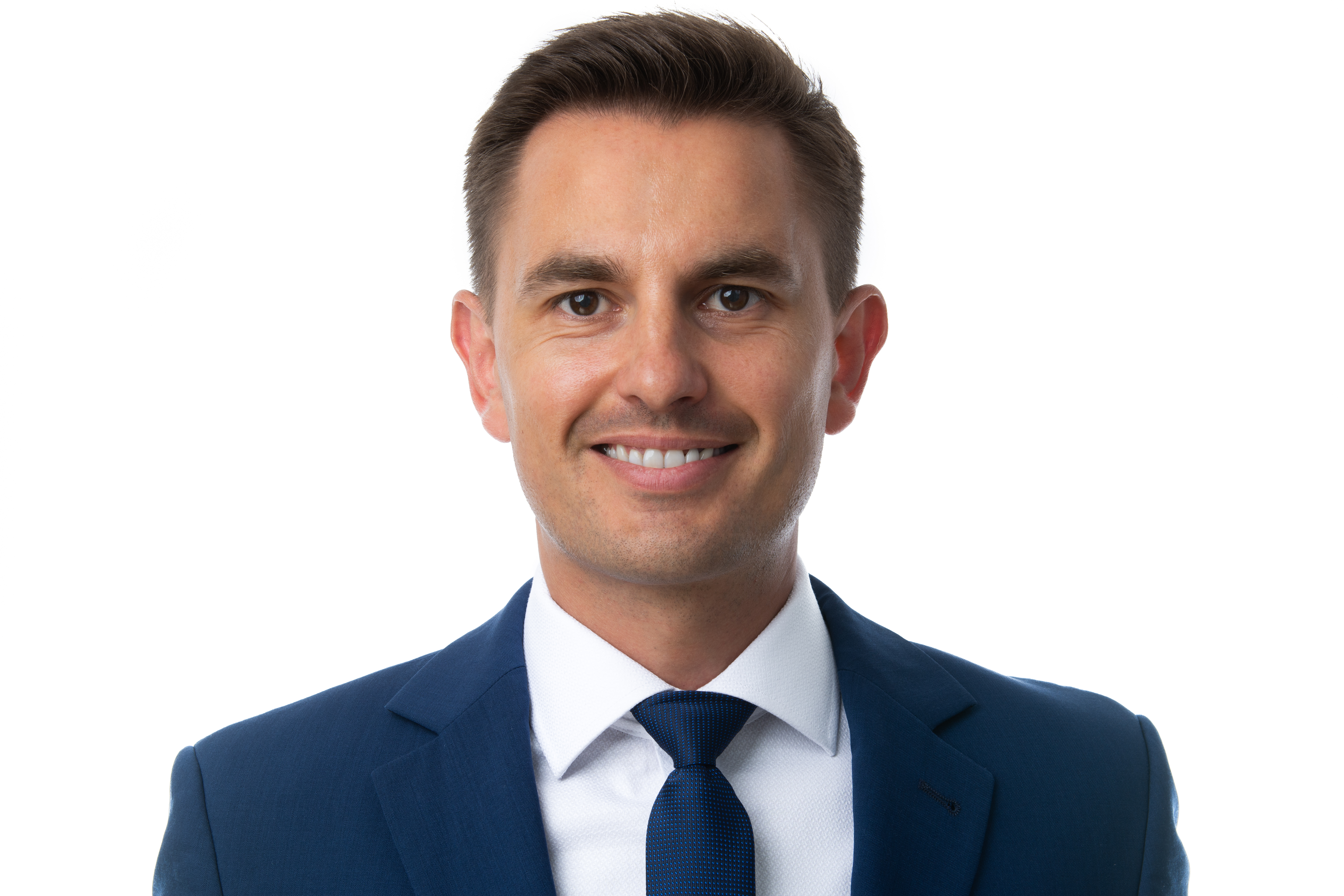
- Myrcha in 2019

Member of the Sejm
- Incumbent
- Assumed office 12 November 2015
- Constituency: Toruń

Deputy Ministry of Justice
- In office 13 December 2023

Personal details
- Born: 1 February 1984 (age 42)
- Party: Civic Platform
- Spouse: Kinga Gajewska (m. 2018)

Arkadiusz Myrcha (born 1 February 1984) is a Polish politician of the Civic Platform. He has been a member of the Sejm since 2015, and has served as deputy minister of justice since 2023. He was previously a city councillor of Toruń from 2010 to 2015. In 2018, he married Kinga Gajewska.
