= Daniel Milewski =

Polish politician (born 1989)

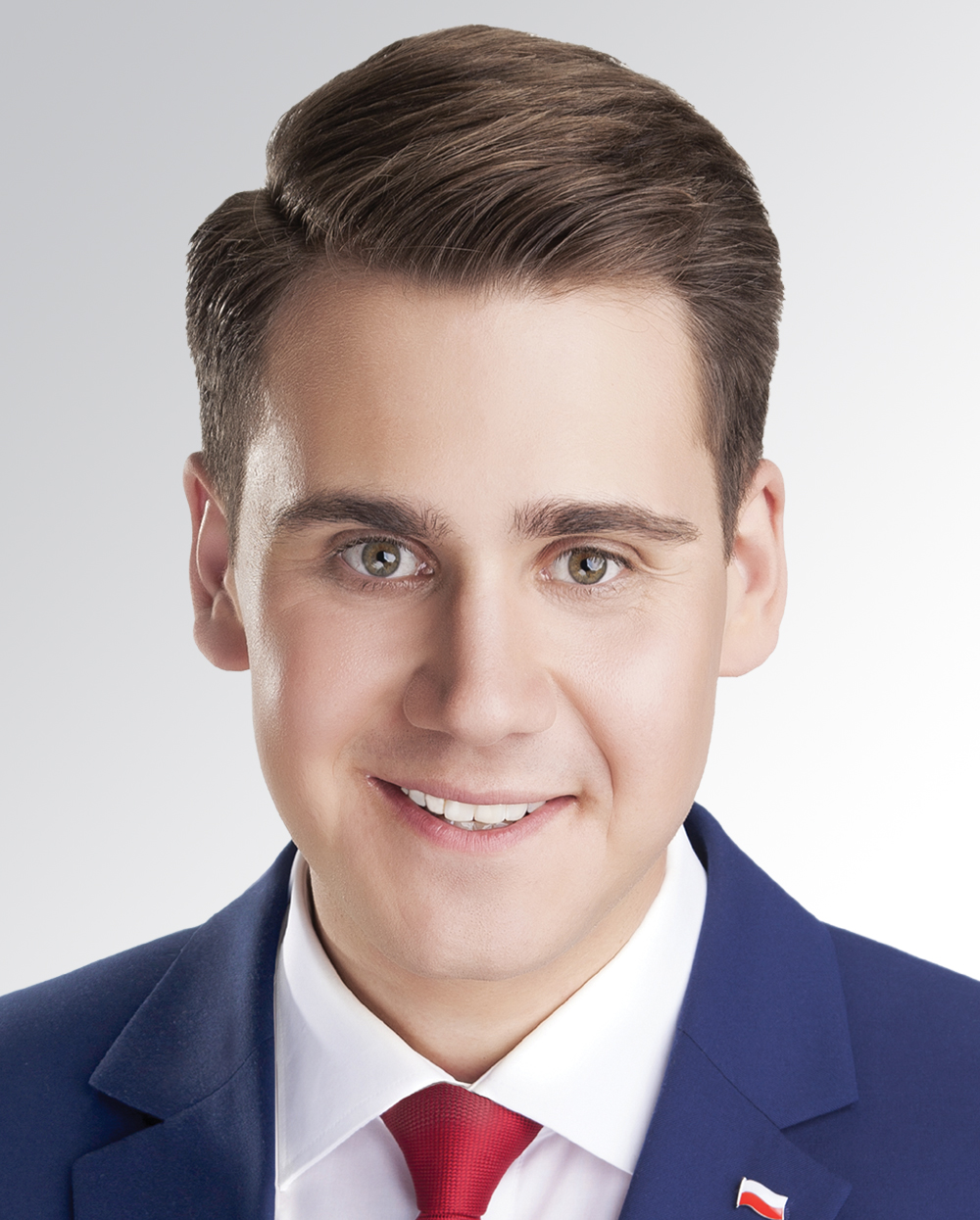
- Milewski in 2015

Member of the Sejm
- Incumbent
- Assumed office 12 November 2015
- Constituency: Siedlce

Personal details
- Born: 22 November 1989 (age 36)
- Party: Law and Justice

Daniel George Milewski (born 22 November 1989) is a Polish politician of Law and Justice serving as a member of the Sejm. He was first elected in the 2015 parliamentary election, and was re-elected in 2019 and 2023. He previously served as chairman of the Mińsk County council.
