= Kinga Gajewska =

Polish politician (born 1990)

Kinga Magdalena Gajewska
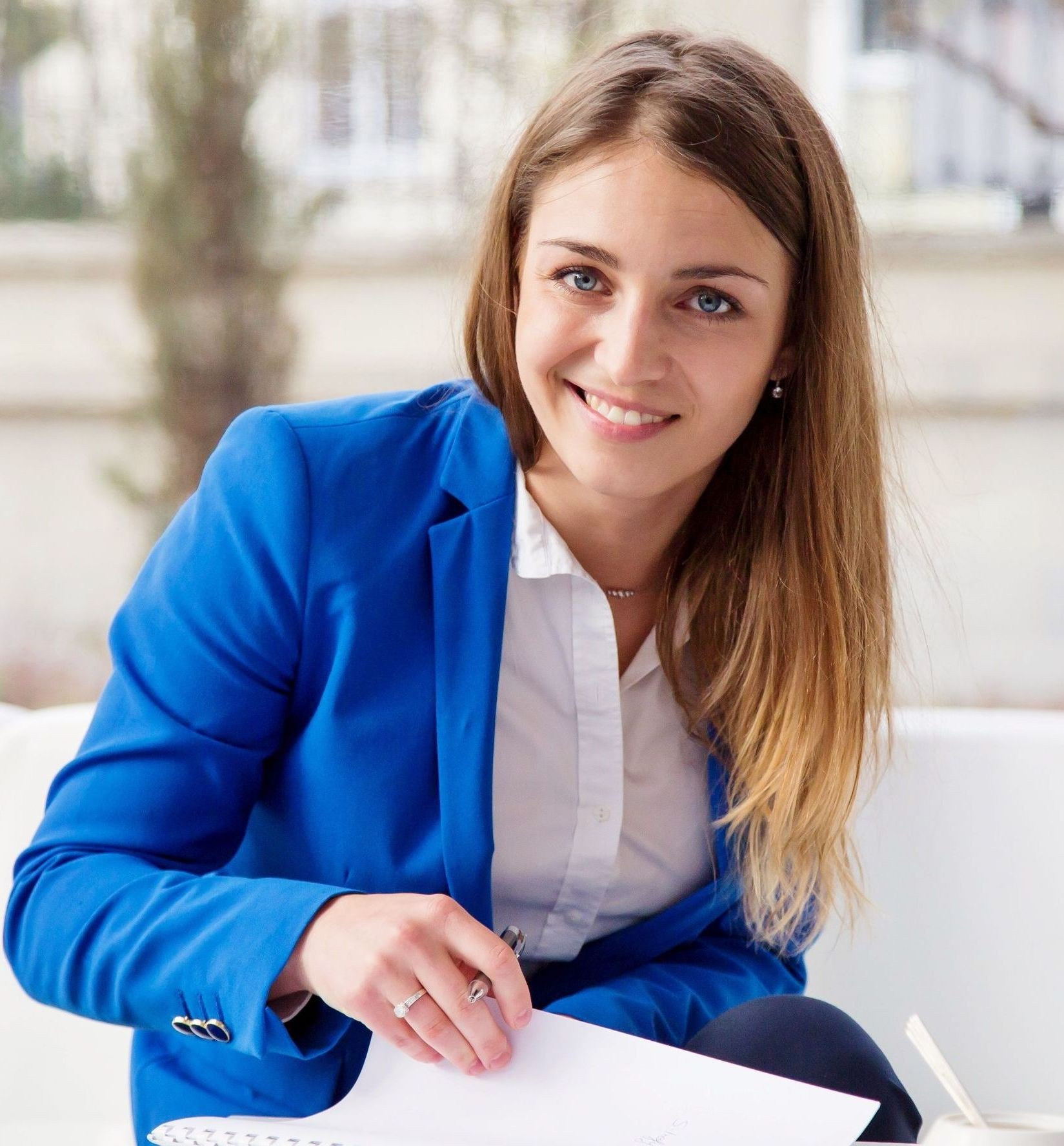

Member of the Sejm
- In office 11 November 2015
- Constituency: Warsaw II (parliamentary constituency)

Personal details
- Born: Kinga Magdalena Gajewska; 22 July 1990 (age 36) Warsaw, Poland
- Party: Civic Platform
- Spouse: Arkadiusz Myrcha (m. 2018)
- Children: 3
- Education: University of Warsaw

Kinga Magdalena Gajewska (born July 22, 1990, in Warsaw) is a Polish politician, political scientist, lawyer and local government official. She has been member of the Sejm since the 2015 election.

== Life and career ==
Gajewska attended the Stefan Zeromski Bilingual High School in Warsaw. In 2011–2012, she obtained a scholarship to the Free University of Berlin, where she graduated from the School of Political Leaders. Since 2010, she has been running her own business.

A graduate of political science at the Faculty of Journalism and Political Science at the University of Warsaw (2014) and a graduate of doctoral studies at the same faculty (2017), in 2018 she obtained a master's degree in law from the university's Faculty of Law and Administration.

In 2008 she joined the Civic Platform party, and was appointed to the regional and local party authorities. She assumed the position of chair for the Young Democrats Association in Warsaw, and then in the Mazovia Voivodeship. She ran unsuccessfully in the 2014 elections to the European Parliament (where she received 6221 votes). In the local government elections of the same year, she was elected councillor in the Mazovian Parliament (receiving 10,004 votes) from the list of the Civic Platform party (Platforma Obywatelska). In the parliamentary elections in 2015, on behalf of the Civic Platform, she ran for Parliament representing the Warsaw district. She was elected an MP for the 8th Parliamentary term of office, receiving 4,820 votes.

In Parliament, she was a member of the Education, Science and Youth Committee and of the Justice and Human Rights Committee, and also worked in the Digitization, Innovation and Modern Technologies Committee (2015–2016). She was also chair of the Parliamentary Group on the Future of Education In the 2019 elections, she successfully ran for parliamentary re-election, running on behalf of the Civic Coalition party (Koalicja Obywatelstwa) and receiving 35,912 votes.

On September 19, 2023, during an election rally, police officers forcibly dragged Gajewska into a police car. The actions of the police were met with widespread criticism, including accusations of violating parliamentary immunity and exceeding their authority.

In the parliamentary elections of 2023, she secured a parliamentary mandate for the third time, receiving 85,283 votes.

== Personal life ==
In 2018, she married MP Arkadiusz Myrcha, with whom she has three children.

She is a competitive motocross rider. In the 2013 season, she achieved third place in the Polish championship and in the 2014 season, she was selected for the national team. Additionally, she was appointed to the Women's Committee of the Polish Motor Association. She was a co- organizer of the first Polish MX Women's Cup in 2011 and the Polish Women's Motocross Championship in 2013.

For 12 years she was a member of the Latin American dance formation ensemble "BRAWKO". From 1999 to 2003, she participated in the Polish Dance Formation Championships in Kraśnik, winning several times the runner-up prize in the Latin category, as well as placing at the International Children's Song and Dance Festival in Konin, receiving many silver and bronze medals for her performances.

== See also ==
- Politics of Poland
- List of Sejm members (2023–2027)
