= Agnieszka Soin =

Polish politician (born 1977)

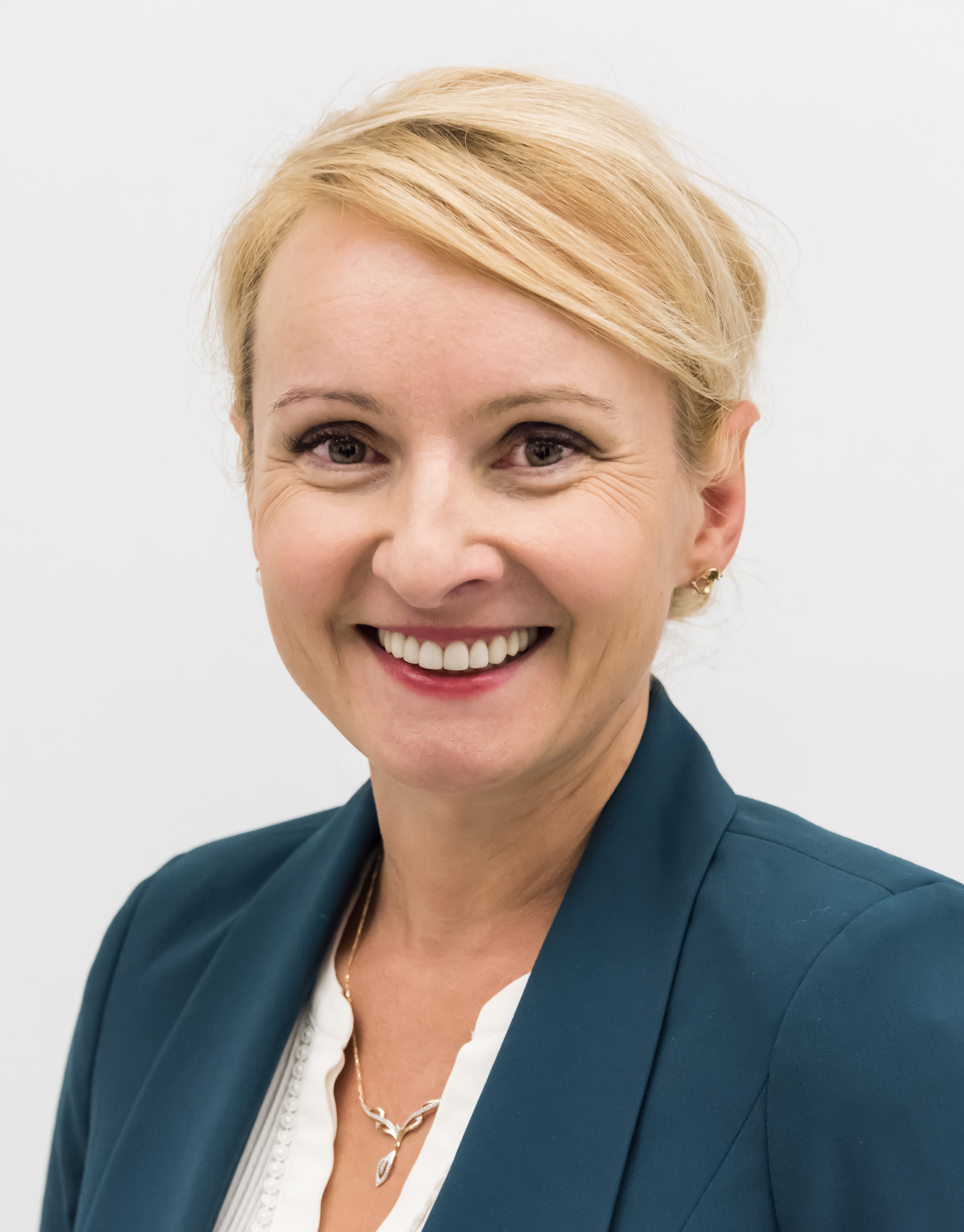

Member of the Sejm

Personal details
- Born: 9 February 1977 (age 49) Szczytno, Poland
- Party: Law and Justice

Agnieszka Anna Soin (born 9 February 1977) is a Polish politician. She was elected to the Sejm (9th term) representing the constituency of Wrocław. She previously also served in the 8th term of the Sejm (2015–2019). She is affiliated with the Law and Justice party.
