= Czesław Mroczek =

Polish politician (born 1964)

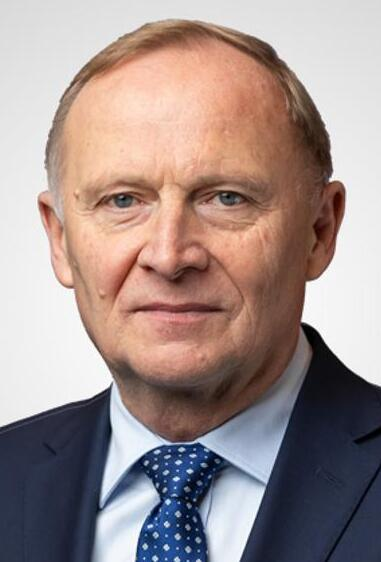

Member of the Sejm
- Incumbent
- Assumed office 25 September 2005
- Constituency: 18 – Siedlce

Deputy Minister of Infrastructure
- In office 14 December 2023

Personal details
- Born: 20 July 1964 (age 61)
- Party: Civic Platform

Czesław Mroczek (born 20 July 1964 in Kałuszyn) is a Polish politician. He was elected to the Sejm on 25 September 2005, getting 8,311 votes in 18 Siedlce district as a candidate from the Civic Platform list. He was re-elected with 33,207 votes.

== See also ==
- Members of Polish Sejm 2005-2007
