= Krzysztof Mulawa =

Polish politician (born 1985)

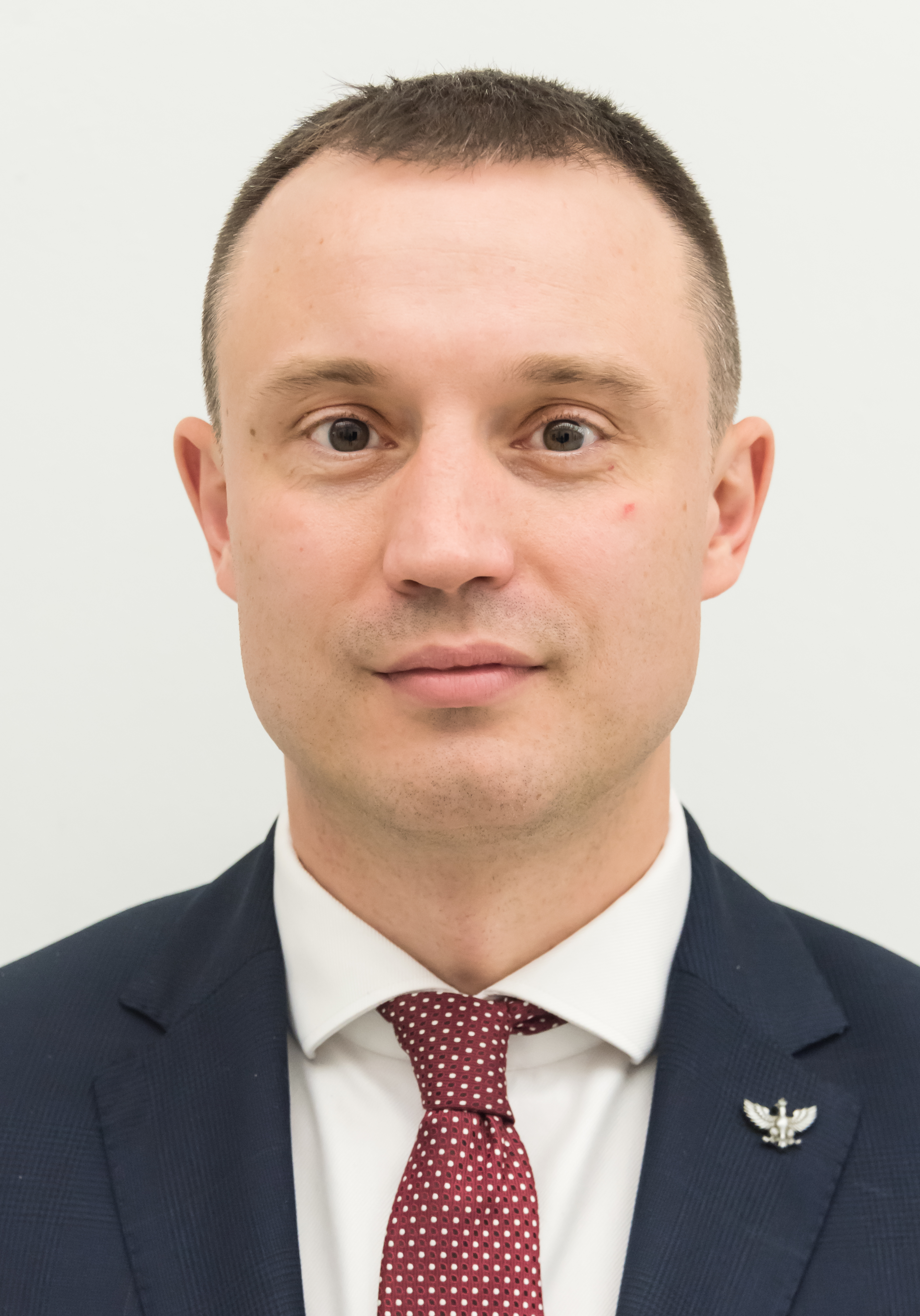
- Mulawa in 2023

Member of the Sejm
- Incumbent
- Assumed office 13 November 2023
- Constituency: Siedlce

Personal details
- Born: 24 June 1985 (age 40)
- Party: National Movement
- Other political affiliations: Confederation Liberty and Independence

Krzysztof Mulawa (born 24 June 1985) is a Polish politician serving as a member of the Sejm since 2023. He is the leader of the Masovian branches of the National Movement and the Confederation Liberty and Independence.
