= Rzepka =

Rzepka (Polish pronunciation: [ʐɛpka]) is a Polish surname and given name.

== Meaning and origin ==
In Polish, the word means kneecap, but the name is actually derived from the diminutive of rzepa (meaning turnip).

== Prevalence ==
Outside of Poland, the name is also prevalent as a surname in Germany and the United States.

== Notable people ==
Notable people with this name include:

- Józef Rzepka (1913–1951), Polish soldier
- Michelle Rzepka (born 1983), American bobsledder
- Piotr Rzepka, Polish football player and manager
- Rzepicha (also known as Rzepka), 9th century Polish ruler

== See also ==
- Rzepa
