= Michał Jach =

Polish politician (born 1951)

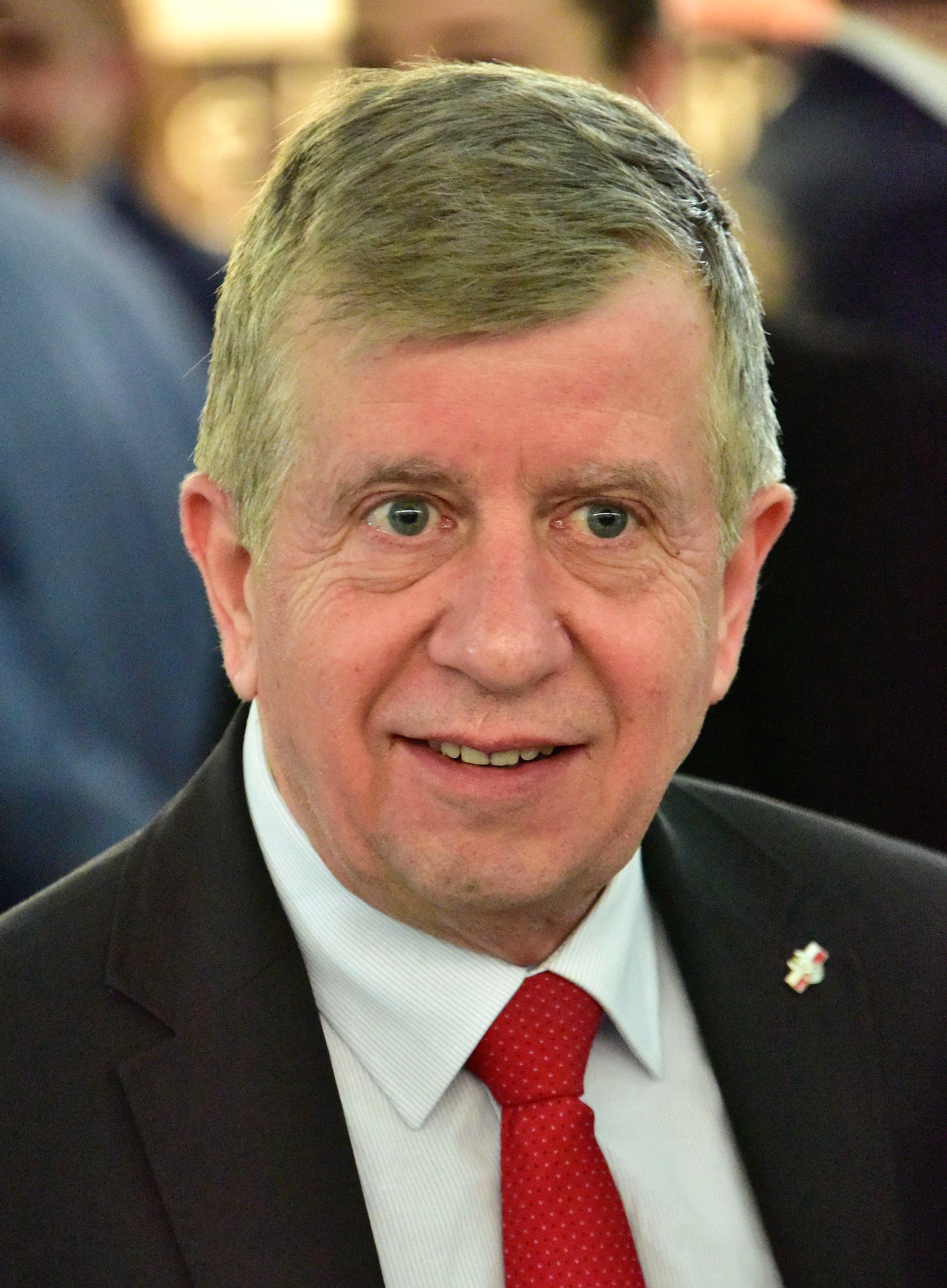

member of Sejm 2005–2007
- In office 25 September 2005 – ?

Personal details
- Born: 23 September 1951 (age 74)
- Party: Law and Justice

Michał Jach (born 23 September 1951 in Łomża) is a Polish politician. He was elected to the Sejm on 25 September 2005, getting 5,724 votes in 41 Szczecin district as a candidate from the Law and Justice list.

== See also ==
- Members of Polish Sejm 2005–2007
