= Jan Kilian (politician) =

Polish politician (1953–2020)

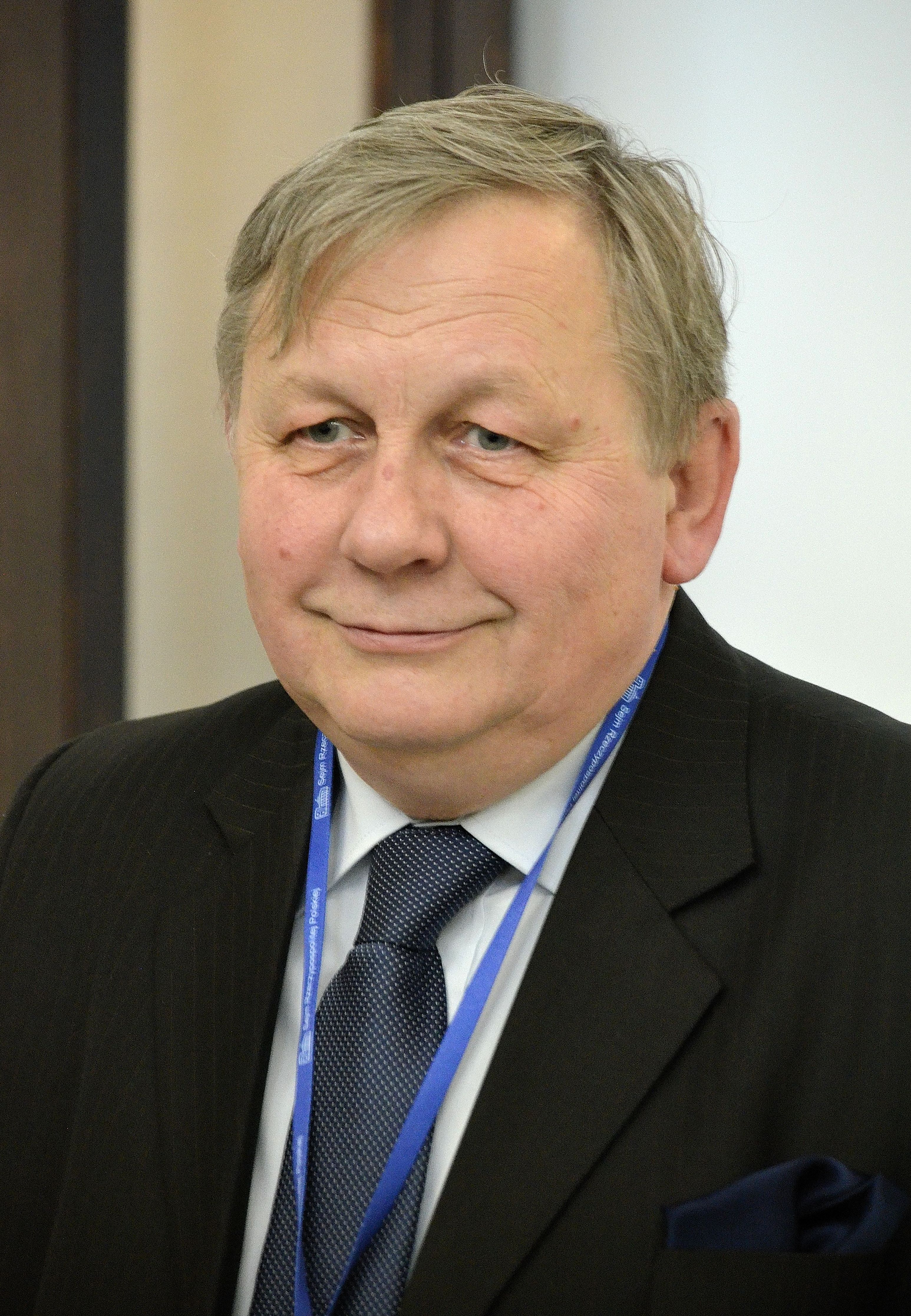
Jan Kilian, 2015

Jan Kilian (1953 – 28 November 2020) was a Polish politician who served as a member of the Sejm.
