= University of Szczecin =

Public university in Szczecin, Poland

Coordinates: 53°26′11″N 14°32′40″E

- Uniwersytet Szczeciński
- Latin: Universitas Stetinensis
- Type: Public university
- Established: 21 July 1984
- Rector: Waldemar Tarczyński
- Administrative staff: 1,900
- Students: 10,212 (12.2023)
- Location: Szczecin, Poland
- Website: www.usz.edu.pl
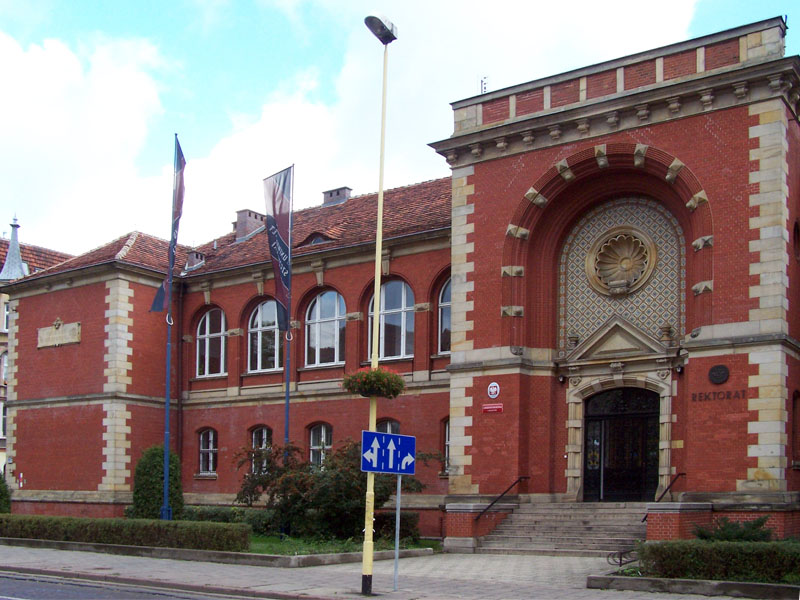

The University of Szczecin (US, USz; Polish: Uniwersytet Szczeciński) is a public university in Szczecin, western Poland. It is the biggest university in West Pomerania, with 33,267 students and a staff of 1,900.

== Faculties ==
The university consists of 9 faculties:

1. Faculty of Humanities
2. Faculty of Law and Administration
3. Faculty of Natural Sciences
4. Faculty of Mathematics and Physics
5. Faculty of Economics and Management
6. Faculty of Management and Economics of Services
7. Faculty of Theology
8. Faculty of Geosciences
9. Faculty of Philology

Since 1998, the university has been taking part in the Erasmus student exchange programme.

== Gallery ==
Locations around the city
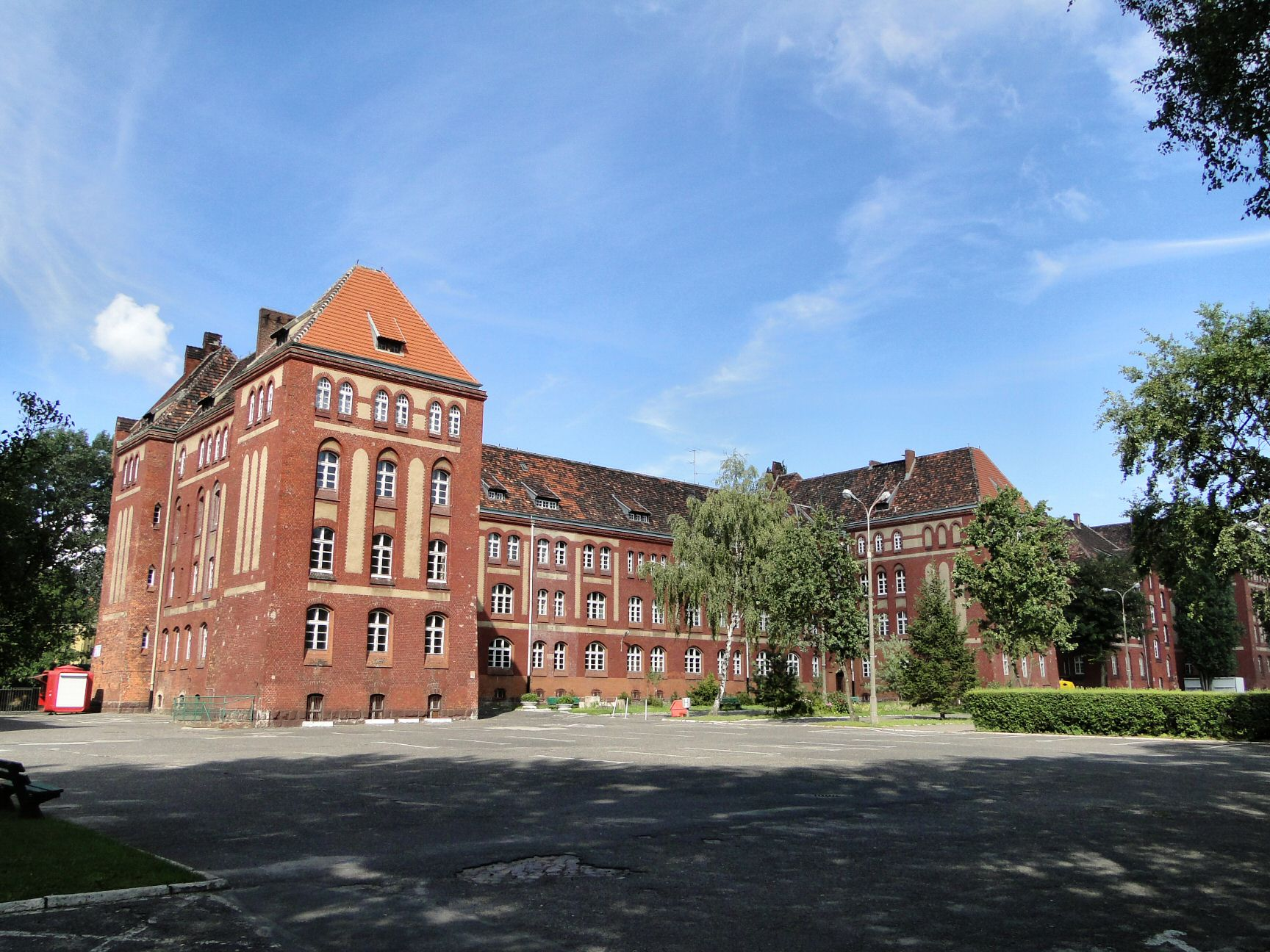
Philology

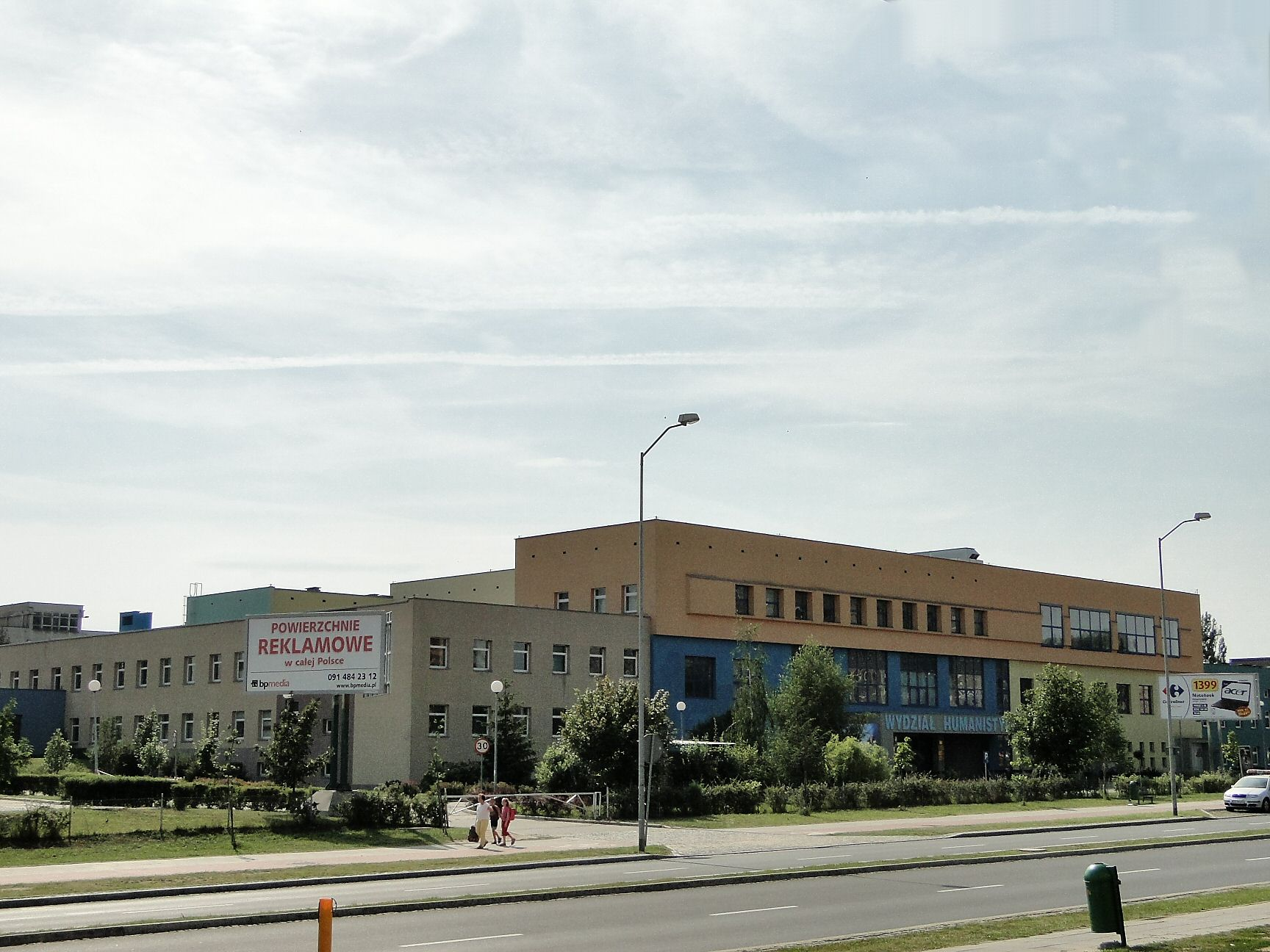
Humanities

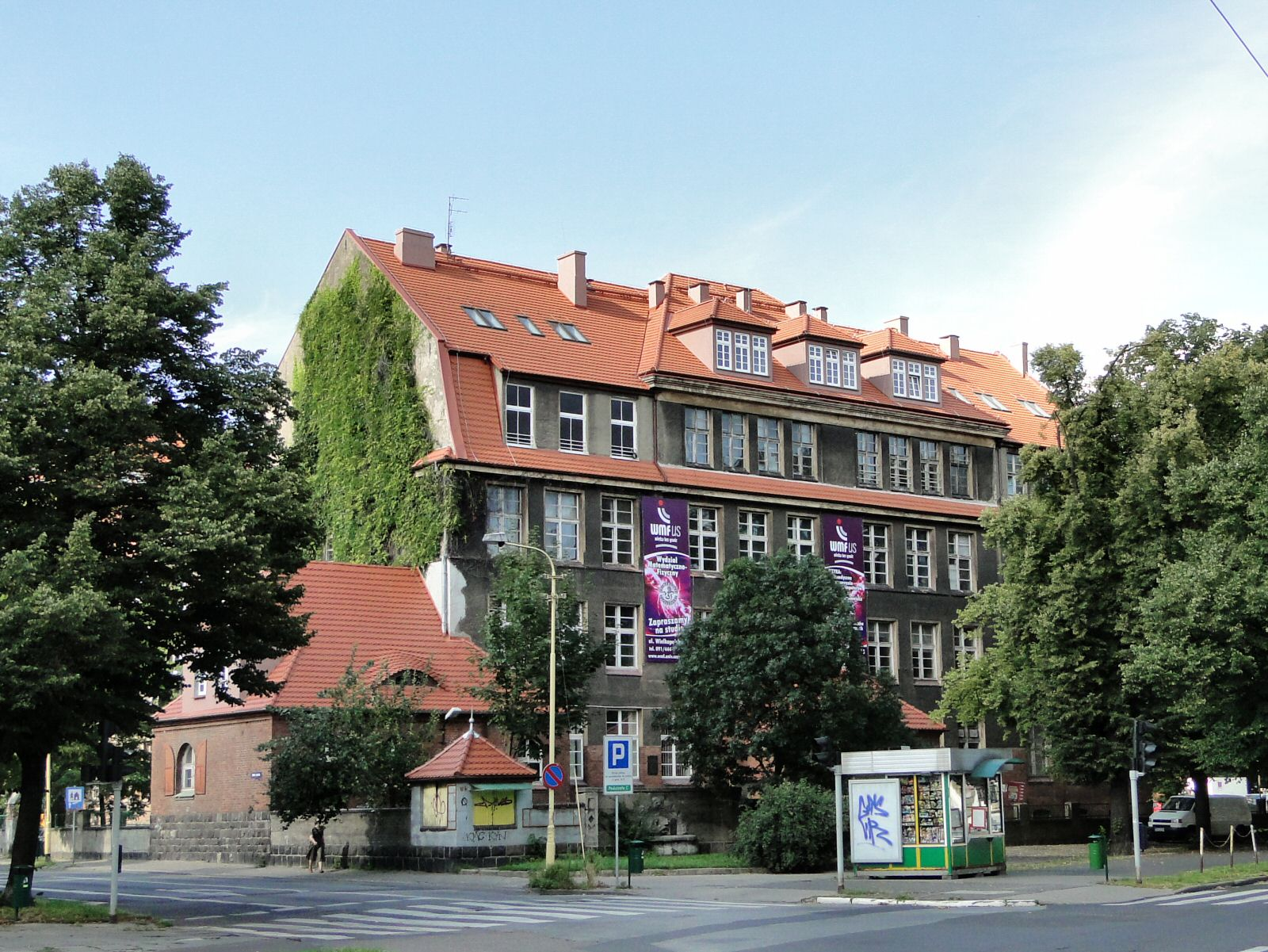
Mathematics & Physics

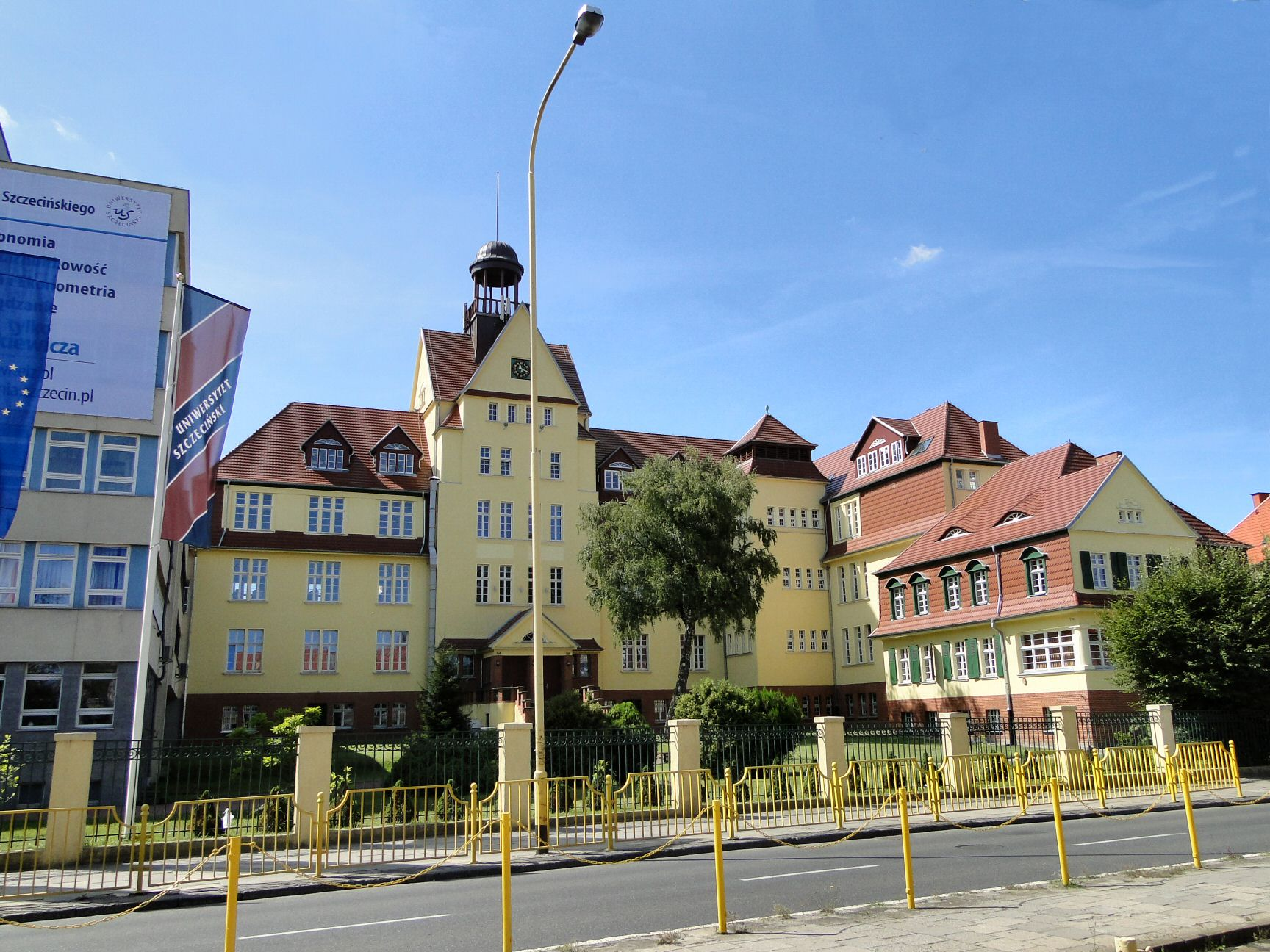
Economics & Management

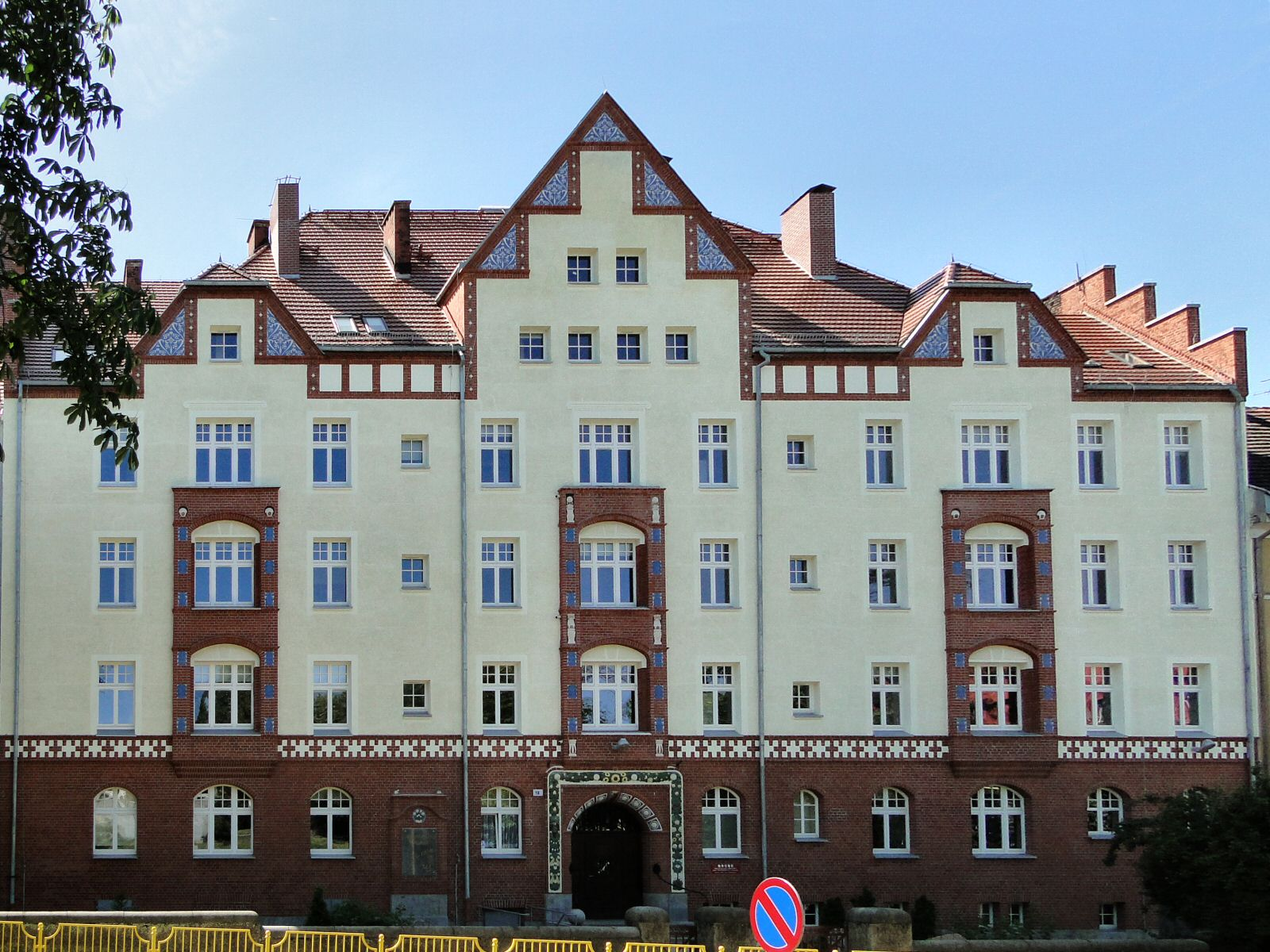
Geosciences

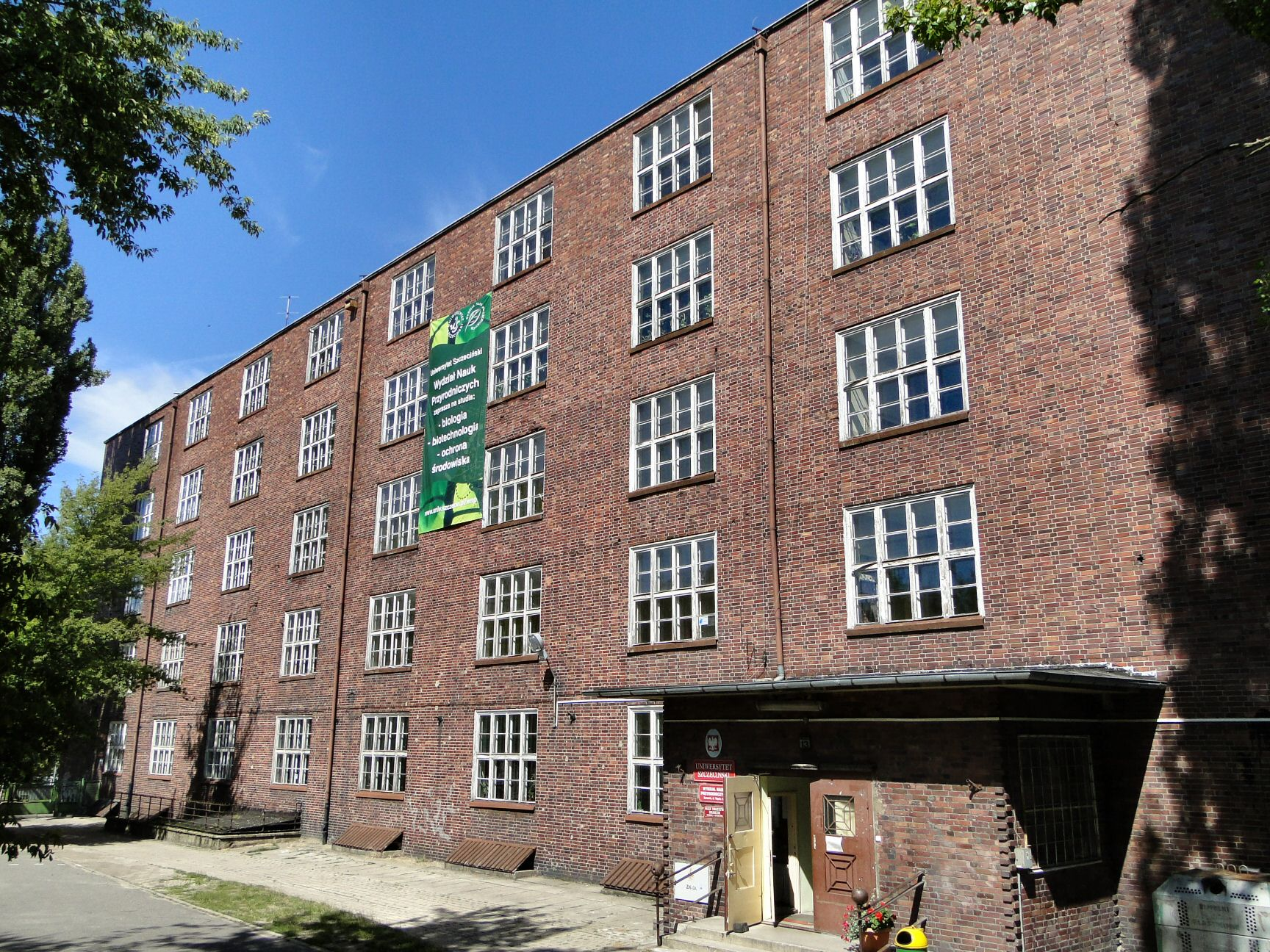
Natural Sciences

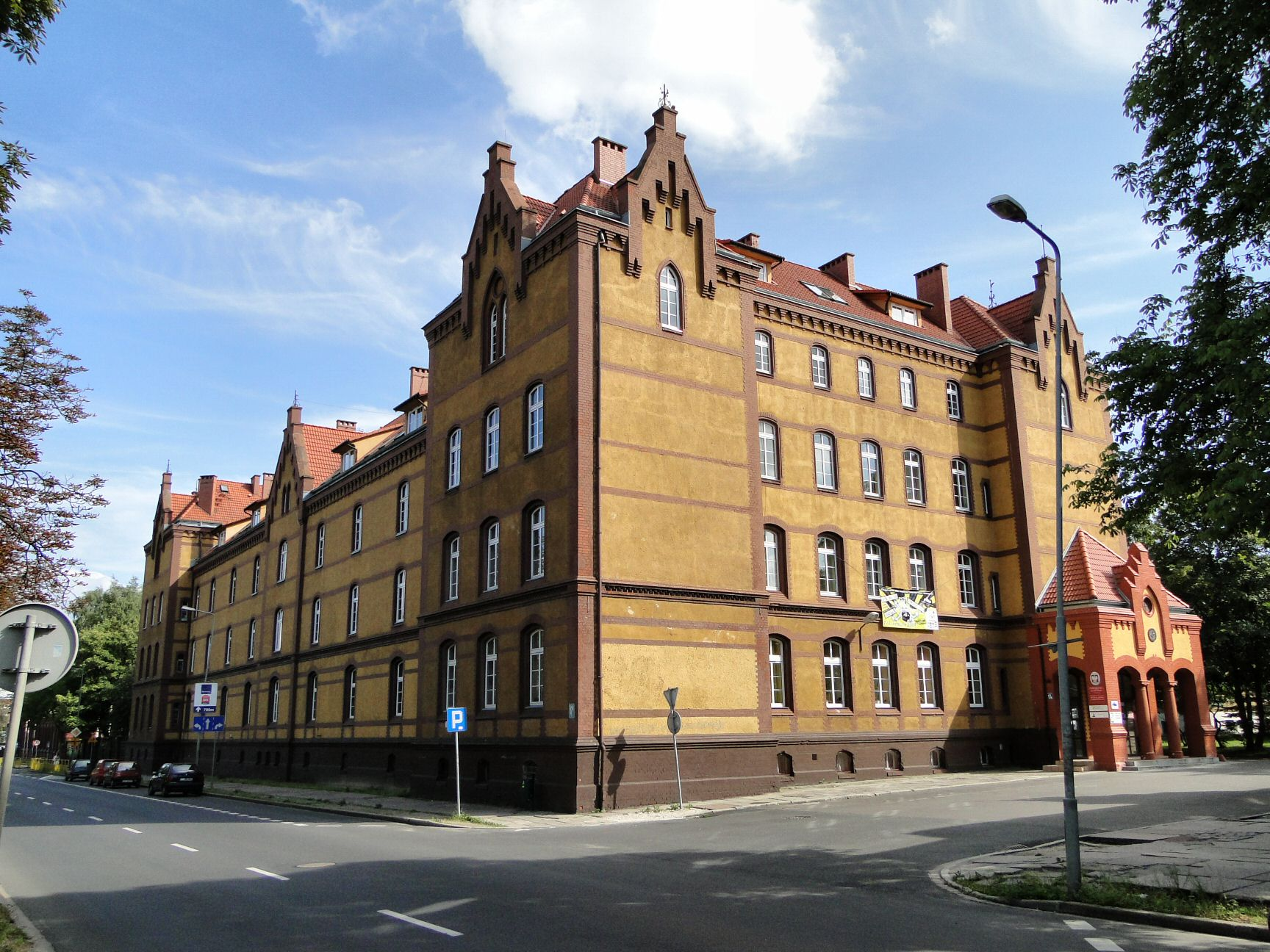
Law & Administration

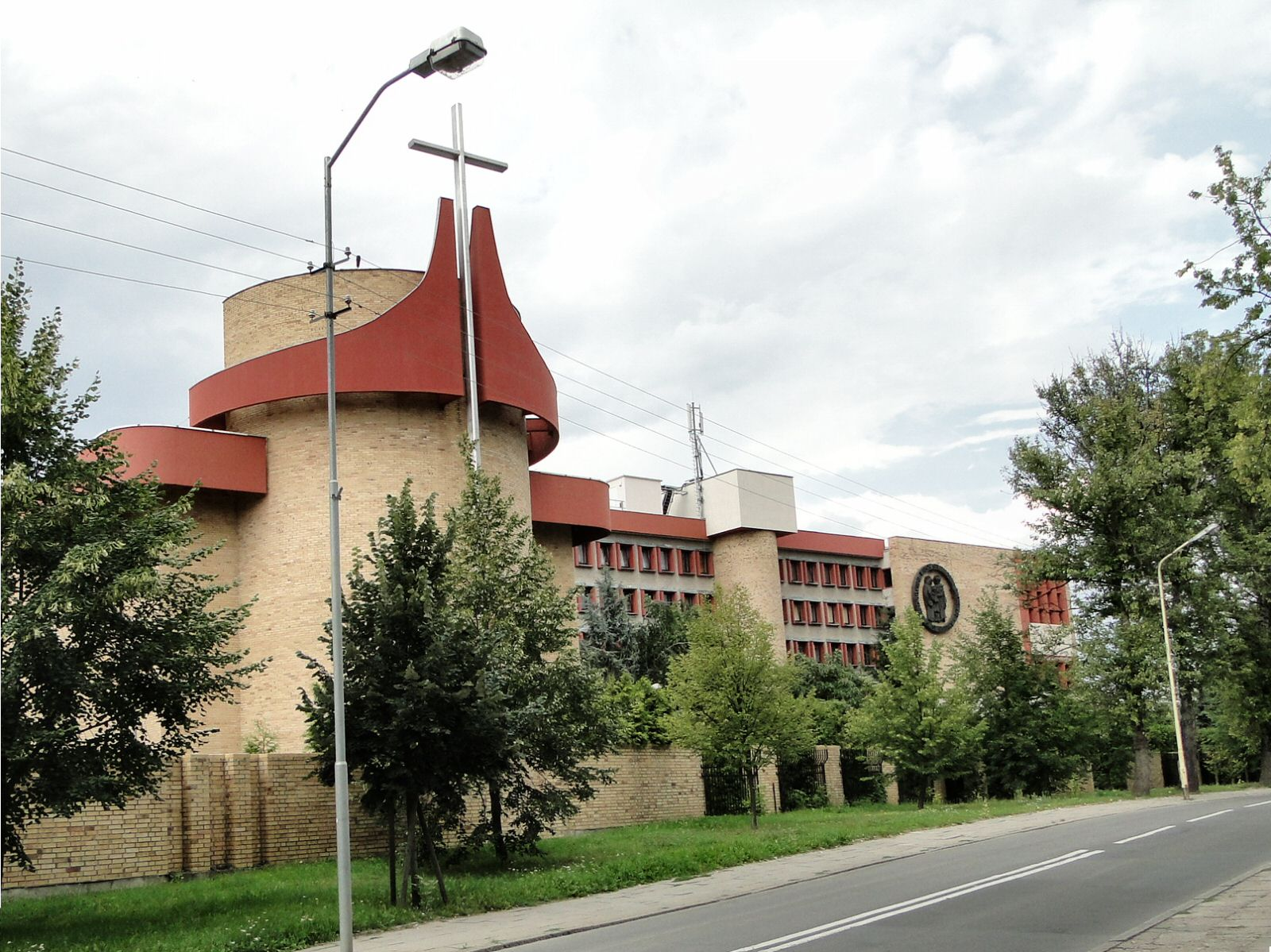
Theology

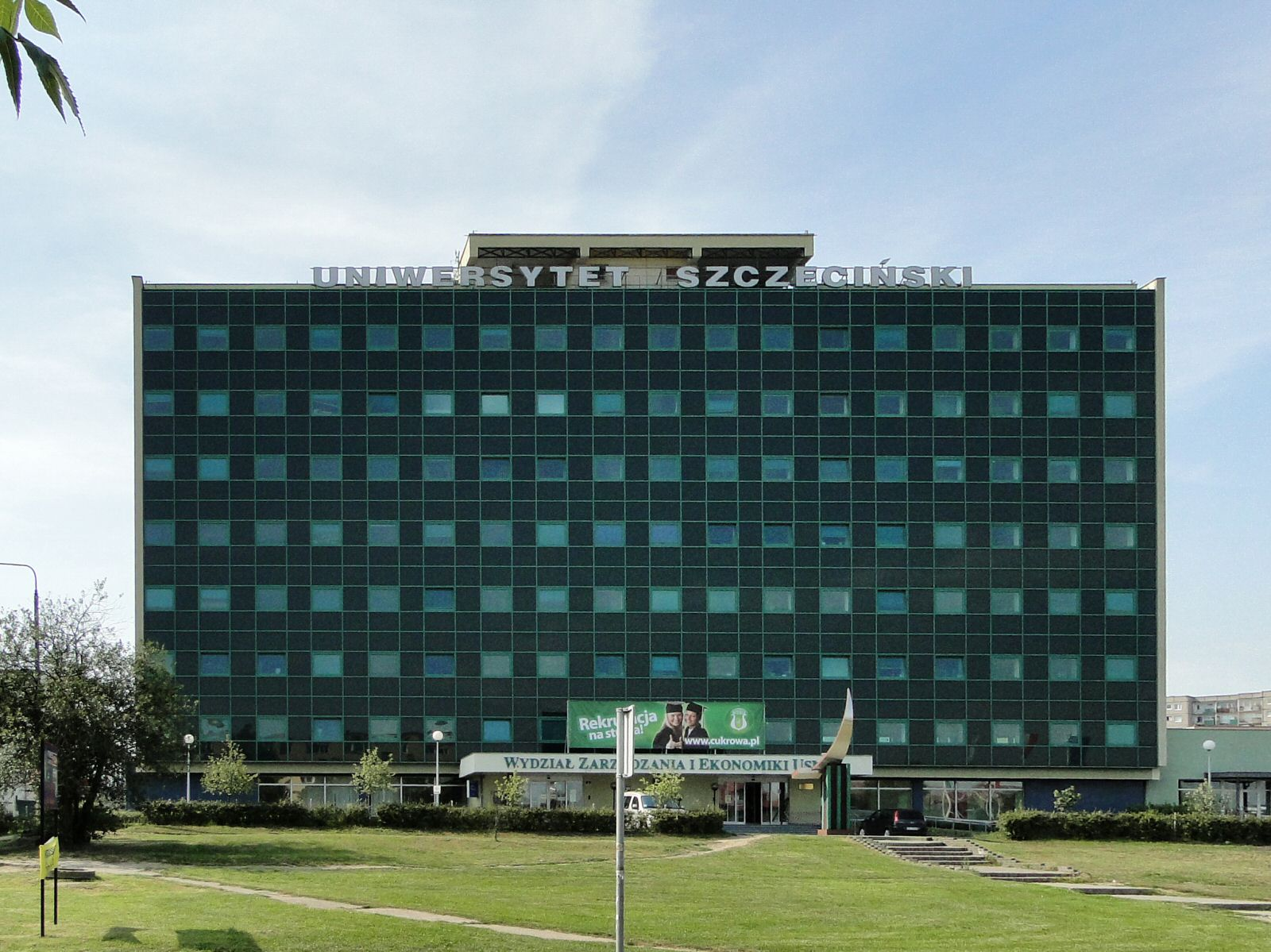
Management and Economics of Services
