= Leszek Dobrzyński =

Polish politician (born 1967)

member of Sejm 2005-2007
- In office 25 September 2005 – ?

Personal details
- Born: 5 June 1967 (age 58)
- Party: Law and Justice

Leszek Dobrzyński (born 5 June 1967 in Szczecin) is a Polish politician. He was elected to the Polish Sejm on 25 September 2005 by getting 7136 votes in 41 Szczecin districts. He was a candidate from the Law and Justice list.

== See also ==
- Members of Polish Sejm 2005-2007
