= Martin Mycielski =

Polish journalist, author and civil society activist

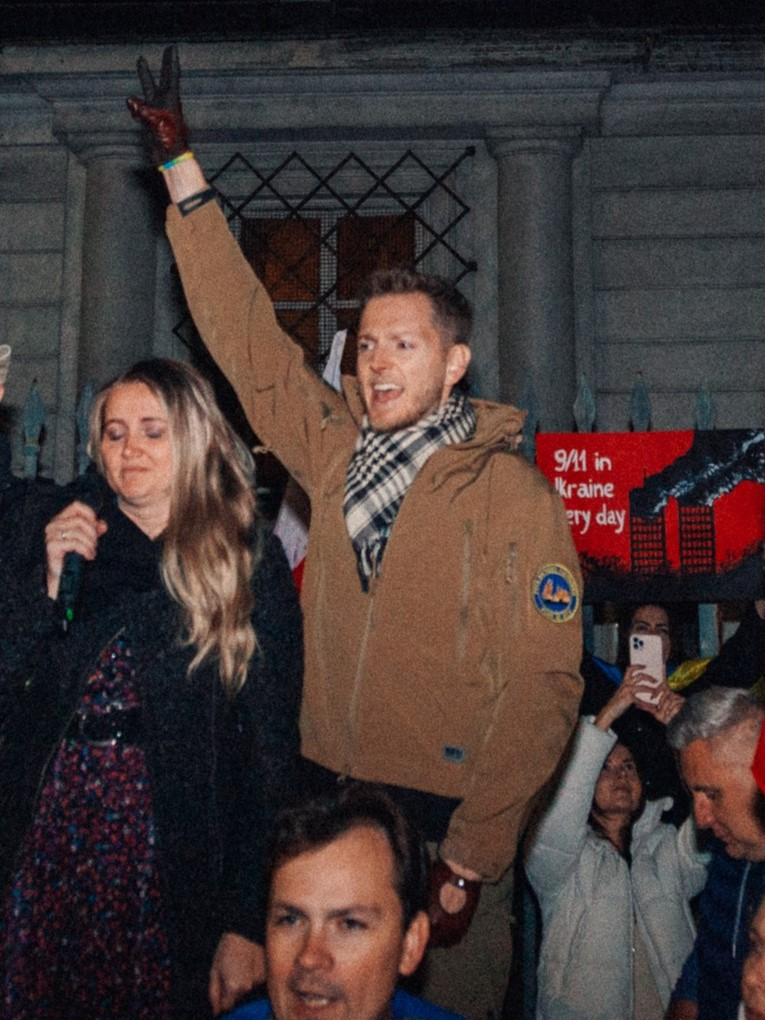
- Martin Mycielski at a rally in front of the Russian Embassy in Warsaw in 2022
- Born: Marcin Stanisław Mycielski; 30 May 1984 (age 42); Zabrze, Poland
- Education: Camilo José Cela University; University of Warsaw; Stanford Graduate School of Business
- Occupations: Journalist, author, civil society activist
- Organization: Open Dialogue Foundation
- Title: Vice-President and Executive Director, Open Dialogue Foundation
- Spouse: Oleksandra Mycielska
- Awards: Unity and Will Order (Ukraine) Honor and Glory White Cross (Ukraine)

Martin Mycielski, also known as Marcin Mycielski (Polish: [mart͡sin-mɨˈt͡ɕɛlskʲi]; born 30 May 1984), is a Polish journalist, author and civil society activist. He is vice-president and executive director of the Open Dialogue Foundation, a Brussels-based non-governmental organisation focused on human rights, the rule of law and support for Ukraine.

== Early life and education ==
Mycielski was born in Zabrze, Poland, on 30 May 1984. He graduated from the Colonel Leopold Lis-Kula XIII Secondary School in Warsaw. He obtained a master's degree in diplomacy and foreign relations from Camilo José Cela University in Madrid and studied English philology, Iberian culture and management at the University of Warsaw. He also graduated from the Stern Leadership Academy at the Stanford Graduate School of Business.

In 2006, while still a student, Mycielski registered the internet domain rydzyk.pl – referring to right-wing media mogul, priest Tadeusz Rydzyk – and put it up for auction. Polish media reported that offers for the domain reached PLN 250,000; it was eventually sold for PLN 9,100.

== Professional and public activity ==
In the early 2000s, Mycielski was active in the Freedom Union and later the Democratic Party – demokraci.pl. He unsuccessfully stood for election to the Sejm in the 2007 Polish parliamentary election.

He worked at the Permanent Representation of the Republic of Poland to the European Union and in the European Parliament. He also worked as a Brussels correspondent for Gazeta Wyborcza. In 2015 and 2016, he co-founded and coordinated the international structures of the Committee for the Defence of Democracy (KOD), serving as its international affairs representative and spokesperson in Brussels.

In April 2016, together with Kamila Gasiuk-Pihowicz, he took part in a Brussels debate on the political situation in Poland organised by the Friedrich Naumann Foundation. In January 2017, he participated in a debate on populism with Eva Maydell, organised by the Wilfried Martens Centre for European Studies, the think tank of the European People's Party.

In 2017, Mycielski was one of the founders of EU DisinfoLab, a European non-governmental organisation focused on countering disinformation. He later served as its communications director and contributed to the development of systems for detecting and tracking disinformation.

In February 2020, he was briefly appointed head of the Belgian campaign staff of Małgorzata Kidawa-Błońska, the Civic Platform candidate in the 2020 Polish presidential election. The decision was later withdrawn after criticism from right-wing media and politicians.

=== Spontaneous Citizens' Staff ===
In 2020, together with Bartosz Kramek, Mycielski founded an informal civic campaign group known in Polish as Spontaniczny Sztab Obywatelski ("Spontaneous Citizens' Staff"). The group organised crowdfunded, nationwide billboard and banner campaigns criticising the Law and Justice government, state television, the Polish Catholic Church and nationalist groups.

The group's first campaign placed 173 billboards across Poland criticising the allocation of PLN 2 billion in public funding to the state broadcaster Telewizja Polska rather than to healthcare. Later campaigns addressed the 2020 presidential election during the COVID-19 pandemic, state media, nationalist campaigns, the humanitarian crisis on the Polish-Belarusian border and access to abortion assistance.

In 2021, Mycielski and Kramek were sued by Law and Justice MP Joanna Lichocka over the billboard campaign. In November 2023, the District Court for Warsaw-Śródmieście discontinued the criminal defamation case, finding that the campaign constituted permissible criticism of a political party and its MPs in a democratic state.

Polish media reported that between 2020 and 2023 the activists displayed more than 480 billboards and between 100 and 200 banners across Poland, using 34 different designs.

Before the 2025 Polish presidential election, Mycielski resumed the initiative with further billboard campaigns critical of Law and Justice candidate Karol Nawrocki and far-right candidates Sławomir Mentzen and Grzegorz Braun, linking them to Vladimir Putin.

=== Meal for a Doctor ===
In March 2020, during the COVID-19 pandemic, Mycielski and Patryk Wachowiec from the Civil Development Forum initiated the campaign Posiłek Dla Lekarza ("Meal for a Doctor"). The campaign supported healthcare workers while also helping small restaurants affected by pandemic restrictions.

The campaign was co-organised by Spontaneous Citizens' Staff, the Open Dialogue Foundation, the Civil Development Forum and the Niskie Składki Association. According to the campaign's financial summary, the campaign provided support worth almost PLN 800,000. More than PLN 681,000 was raised through the crowdfunding platform Zrzutka.pl, allowing 257 restaurants to provide meals to around 260 hospitals and medical facilities across Poland.

=== Sok z Buraka ===
From April to November 2021, Mycielski served as editor-in-chief of the satirical website and social media project Sok z Buraka ("Beetroot Juice") during the period when it was operated by the Open Dialogue Foundation. The foundation later withdrew from running the page, citing disagreements over content published by its founders and a divergence from the new editorial line.

In 2021, Mycielski was questioned by police in Brussels under a European Investigation Order (EIO) issued in Poland in connection with a tweet published by the Sok z Buraka account. The EIO was issued by the national prosecution service following a notification filed by Law and Justice chairman Jarosław Kaczyński, naming Mycielski as the potential culprit.

=== Open Dialogue Foundation ===
In August 2018, Mycielski was among the signatories of an appeal initiated by Lech Wałęsa calling for the return to the European Union of Lyudmyla Kozlovska, president of the Open Dialogue Foundation, after her expulsion from the Schengen Area by the Law and Justice government the foundation criticised.

==== Rule of law ====
In July 2019, during a visit by Polish President Andrzej Duda to Washington, D.C., Mycielski and an Open Dialogue Foundation delegation held meetings with representatives of the United States Department of State, United States Congress and other stakeholders to discuss the rule of law and civil liberties in Poland.

In March 2020, as part of the European Commission’s annual EU Justice Scoreboard, the Commission published input submitted by Mycielski and prepared together with the Polish judges’ associations Themis and Iustitia concerning the treatment of judges in Poland.

In June 2020, together with legal scholar Laurent Pech, he initiated an open letter to the European Commission calling for action over Poland's Disciplinary Chamber of the Supreme Court of Poland, including the case of judge Igor Tuleya. The letter was signed by US and European legal scholars, as well as legal associations and Polish public figures such as Wojciech Sadurski or Leszek Balcerowicz.

In October 2021, Mycielski spoke at a conference marking the 30th anniversary of the OSCE Office for Democratic Institutions and Human Rights (ODIHR), co-organised with the Polish Ministry of Foreign Affairs. He criticised democratic standards in Poland and called for international pressure, rule-of-law conditionality mechanisms and sanctions against what he called "the Law and Justice regime". In September 2022, he also spoke at an OSCE ODIHR plenary session on the politicisation of the public prosecution service in Poland and its victims.

In January 2024, on a TV show hosted by State Tribunal deputy president Jacek Dubois, Mycielski and Kramek presented ODF's report on politicised cases of the prosecution service and failures to initiate an investigation from Zbigniew Ziobro's tenure as Prosecutor General.

In February 2024, on behalf of the Open Dialogue Foundation, Mycielski submitted an appeal to Prosecutor General Adam Bodnar calling for a review of politically motivated prosecutorial proceedings from 2015 to 2023 and for the rehabilitation of victims. The appeal was signed by 34 non-governmental organisations and 44 public figures, including Lech Wałęsa. In response, Bodnar published an open letter supporting the review and announced the creation of teams of prosecutors to analyse cases suspected of being politically motivated.

Also in February 2024, Mycielski hosted the first civic hearing of candidates for the office of Poland's National Prosecutor. Participants included future National Prosecutor Dariusz Korneluk and future General Counsel to the Minister of Justice Ewa Wrzosek.

In May 2024, Mycielski submitted a criminal notification to Poland's National Prosecutor's Office on ODF's behalf concerning three Ziobro-appointed disciplinary officers for ordinary court judges. The foundation accused them of abuses of power and participation in an organised crime group, led by Ziobro, aimed at independent judges under the previous government.

In 2025, Mycielski criticised the work of prosecutors reviewing politically sensitive cases from the period of Ziobro's tenure as justice minister and published a commentary on the issue in Verfassungsblog.

==== Ukraine support ====
Since Russia's full-scale invasion of Ukraine in 2022, Mycielski has coordinated humanitarian aid deliveries to Ukraine and organised humanitarian missions to front-line areas. In September 2022, he took part in a humanitarian convoy to the Kherson region together with editors of Gazeta Wyborcza. In January 2023, he organised a mission to Bakhmut with Polish MPs Adam Szłapka, Piotr Borys, Paweł Krutul, Hanna Gill-Piątek and Witold Zembaczyński.

In June 2023, after the destruction of the Kakhovka Dam, he organised a convoy to flood-affected Kherson, delivering rescue equipment worth PLN 250,000, including PLN 100,000 funded by the City of Warsaw.

In October 2024, Polish-Ukrainian media reported that the Open Dialogue Foundation had provided more than PLN 42 million in aid to the Armed Forces of Ukraine since the beginning of Russia's full-scale invasion. An article also described a campaign led by Mycielski to support Ukrainian veterans with bionic prostheses, in cooperation with the Polish-American-Indian company Aether Biomedical, the producer of the Zeus bionic hand. During the mission, a Ukrainian veteran undergoing rehabilitation at the Unbroken National Rehabilitation Center in Lviv received a Zeus prosthesis provided through the foundation's initiative.

On 23 August 2025, Ukraine's National Flag Day, Mycielski was the main organiser of a pro-Ukrainian happening outside the Russian embassy in Warsaw, during which Polish and Ukrainian activists poured yellow and blue road paint on Belwederska Street to create a large Ukrainian flag in front of the embassy. The action was organised by activists from the Open Dialogue Foundation, the Committee for the Defence of Democracy, Euromaidan-Warsaw, the All-Poland Women's Strike, Akcja Demokracja and Lotna Brygada Opozycji. Mycielski said the action was intended to confront Russian diplomats with "colours of resistance and freedom" rather than the colours of the Russian flag, and to show that Poles continued to stand with Ukraine more than three years after Russia's full-scale invasion. Police identified several participants, and city services later cleaned the road surface. In February 2026, OKO.press reported that Warsaw police were seeking court penalties against pro-Ukrainian activists involved in the happening, alleging several petty offences, while the organisers stated that they had used special non-toxic, water-based road paint and had taken steps to ensure driver safety and clean-up.

For his work in support of Ukraine, Mycielski was awarded the Ukrainian Order of "Unity and Will" by members of the Verkhovna Rada, together with Rafał Trzaskowski, and the White Cross "Honor and Glory", no. 085.

==== Russia's retaliation ====
In February 2023, a denigrating entry on Mycielski was published by the popular TrackANaziMerc Russian Telegram channel, later revealed to be linked to Russian state media and defence ministry.

In March 2024, the Russian Prosecutor General's Office designated the Open Dialogue Foundation an "undesirable organisation" in Russia, stating that the foundation posed a threat to the constitutional order of the Russian Federation. Polish media reported that the designation was justified by the foundation's support for Ukraine following Russia's full-scale invasion and that Mycielski, together with other members of the foundation's leadership, could face up to 15 years in prison in Russia for managing the foundation.

In April 2025, OKO.press and Gazeta Wyborcza reported that Mycielski had been included on Foreign Combatants, a Russian website described by the outlets as supported by the Russian Ministry of Foreign Affairs and as part of the Kremlin's information war against Ukraine. The website, which originally listed foreigners allegedly fighting for Ukraine, had expanded its scope to include politicians, journalists and activists from several countries who supported Ukraine. According to OKO.press, the Polish section listed 59 people and two organisations, including Mycielski, Kramek and the Open Dialogue Foundation. The website published names, photographs, biographical information and descriptions of their Ukraine-related activity, using language characteristic of Kremlin propaganda and presenting humanitarian and political support for Ukraine as participation in a war against Russia. It also displayed their 'status' as "alive", suggesting a threat to their safety.

Mycielski was also targeted by the so-called Research Center on Evidence of Crimes Against the National Security of the Russian Federation "Tribunal", which listed him as a "war criminal" and "foreign accomplice", "engaged in the recruitment of Polish mercenaries into the Ukrainian Armed Forces and other armed formations".

=== Ordo Iuris ===
In October 2020, together with activists from the Open Dialogue Foundation and Solidarity Action Brussels, Mycielski was involved in a campaign that led to the termination of the lease for the Brussels office of Ordo Iuris, a Polish ultra-conservative legal organisation.

In November 2020, he drafted a complaint to the European Commission concerning Ordo Iuris's lobbying activities in EU institutions. The complaint was signed by 38 Members of the European Parliament from five major political groups.

=== Other ===
In March 2026, Polish media reported that the District Court for Warsaw-Żoliborz had found Mycielski guilty of a petty offence and fined him PLN 500 for hanging a campaign banner of Rafał Trzaskowski on the façade of his residential building in Warsaw during the 2025 Polish presidential election campaign. According to Gazeta Wyborcza, the case followed a complaint by a neighbour and developed into a broader dispute within the housing community, including Mycielski's removal from the community board and separate allegations of harassment against the neighbour, described by Mycielski as xenophobic and hateful towards Ukraine and his family. Mycielski appealed an earlier penal order and argued in court that he had believed displaying the banner during an election campaign was lawful and socially accepted. The court held that the banner had been placed in a public location not designated for that purpose and without the consent of the community board he was a member of. Mycielski announced he would appeal the verdict.

== Writing and publications ==
Mycielski has published in European and international outlets including EUobserver, Euractiv, Politico Europe, Verfassungsblog and The Next Web. In Poland, he has written for Gazeta Wyborcza, Onet.pl and naTemat.pl.

In January 2017, he published The Authoritarian Regime Survival Guide, a set of recommendations based on Polish experiences with democratic backsliding. According to Gazeta Wyborcza and later republication in Verfassungsblog, the text reached 3 million views within one month and was used by protesters in the United States. The text also inspired a short video series by the Civil Liberties Union for Europe.

In 2025, Canadian publisher Maison Kasini Canada published his book Authoritarian Regime Survival Guide. Kolaj Magazine described the book as based on Polish experience and intended to provide tools for recognising and resisting authoritarianism.

== Personal life ==
Mycielski is descended from the noble Mycielski family and from figures including Adam Jerzy Czartoryski. He lives in Brussels and has previously lived in the United Kingdom and Algeria. In July 2023 he married Oleksandra Fedorko; the wedding was officiated by Warsaw mayor Rafał Trzaskowski.

== Selected publications ==
- Mycielski, Martin (2016). "The crisis of European identity and awakening of civil society". European View. 15: 223–232. doi:10.1007/s12290-016-0409-3.
- Mycielski, Martin (26 March 2018). "The Authoritarian Regime Survival Guide". Verfassungsblog. doi:10.17176/20180326-143311.
- Mycielski, Martin; Pech, Laurent (29 April 2020). "When Will the EU Commission Act?: An Open Letter". Verfassungsblog. doi:10.17176/20200429-133704-0.
- Mycielski, Martin (7 May 2020). "Appeal to the independent Judges of the Supreme Court". Verfassungsblog. doi:10.17176/20200508-013139-0.
- Mycielski, Martin (12 March 2025). "A PR Stunt Over Accountability – Review of Political Prosecution Cases in Poland". Verfassungsblog. doi:10.59704/c9349ef316617326. Archived from the original on 21 May 2025.
- Mycielski, Martin (2025). Authoritarian Regime Survival Guide. Maison Kasini Canada. ISBN 978-1-927587-74-4.
