= Piotr Borys =

Polish politician (born 1976)

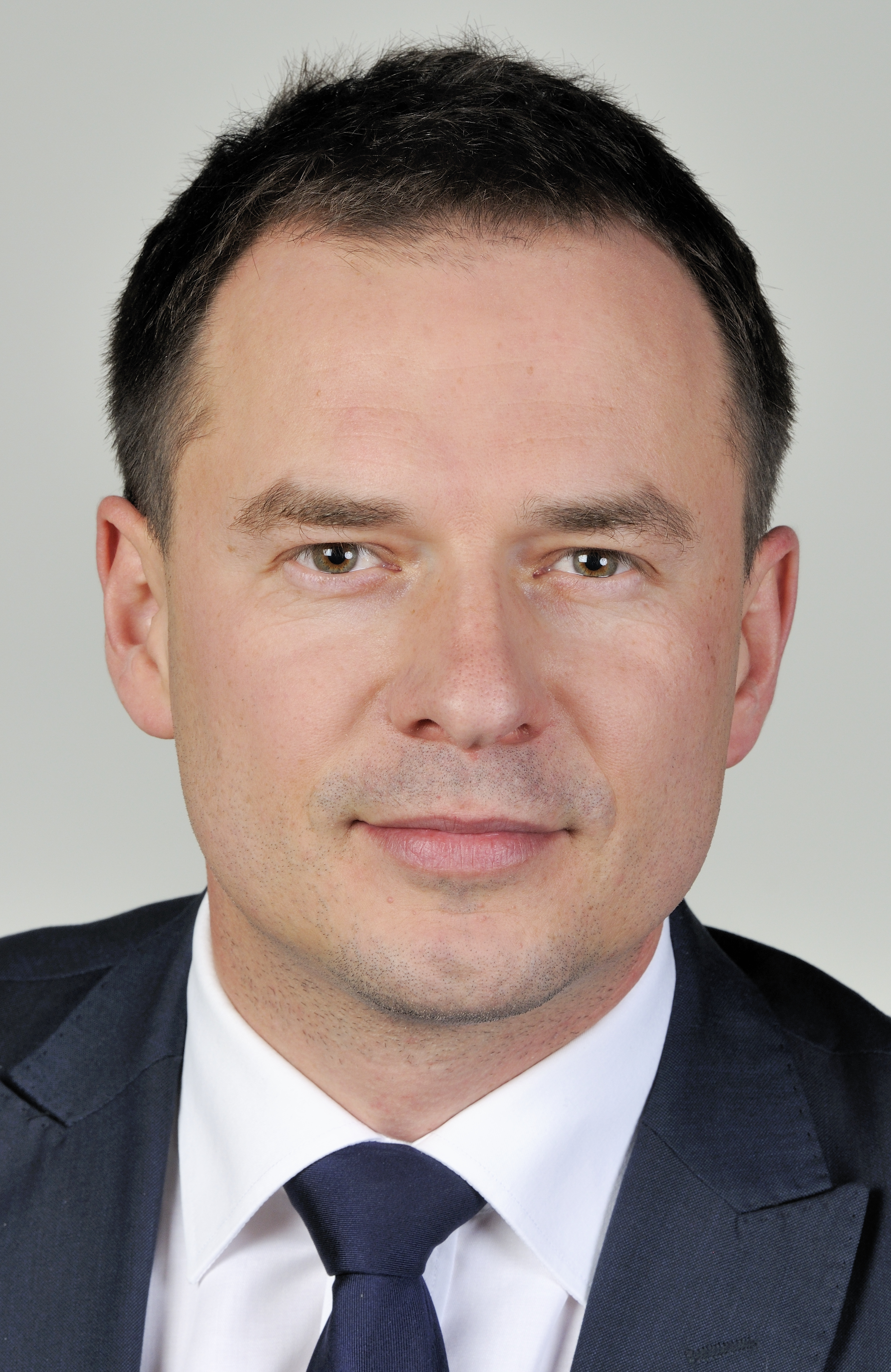
- Borys in 2014

Secretary of State at the Ministry of Sport and Tourism
- Incumbent
- Assumed office 28 December 2023

Member of the Sejm
- Incumbent
- Assumed office 12 November 2019
- Constituency: Legnica

Member of the European Parliament
- In office 14 July 2009 – 30 June 2014
- Constituency: Lower Silesia and Opole

Personal details
- Born: 11 January 1976 (age 50) Bolesławiec, Poland
- Party: Civic Coalition
- Other political affiliations: Civic Platform (2006–2025)
- Education: University of Wrocław

Piotr Borys (Polish: [ˈpiɔtr-'bɔrɨs]; born 11 January 1976) is a Polish politician and former Member of the European Parliament who has served as Secretary of State at the Ministry of Sport and Tourism since December 2023. A member of Civic Coalition (party), he has been a member of the Sejm since 2019 and previously served as a member of the European Parliament from 2009 to 2014.

== Early life and education ==
Borys was born on 11 January 1976 in Bolesławiec. In 2001 he graduated from the Faculty of Law and Administration at the University of Wrocław.

== Local government and early career ==
From 1998 to 2002, Borys was a member of the city council in Lubin, where he also served on the city management board. He later worked at the Arleg Regional Development Agency in Legnica and, from 2005 to 2006, was president of Aquapark Polkowice.

From 2003 to 2009 he was a member of the Lower Silesian Voivodeship Assembly. He served as vice-chairman of the assembly, was later appointed to the voivodeship board, and after the 2006 local elections became deputy marshal of the Lower Silesian Voivodeship. His responsibilities in the voivodeship board included sport and tourism. He also served as president of the Lower Silesian Tourist Organization and sat on the council of the Polish Tourist Organization in Warsaw.

He belonged to the Freedom Union and the Democratic Party, and in 2006 joined Civic Platform.

== European Parliament ==
In the 2009 European Parliament election, Borys was elected from the Lower Silesia and Opole constituency as a Civic Platform candidate, receiving 35,504 votes. He served in the European Parliament from 14 July 2009 to 30 June 2014 as a member of the European People's Party Group.

In the European Parliament he was a member of the Committee on Culture and Education and the delegation for relations with Afghanistan. He also served as a substitute member of the Committee on Legal Affairs and the delegation for relations with Central Asia. His parliamentary work included reports on European cinema in the digital era and on the implementation of the Audiovisual Media Services Directive.

== Return to Polish politics ==
From January to November 2015, Borys served as chief adviser to Poland's Minister of Foreign Affairs. From 2016 to 2019 he headed the National Office of Civic Platform. In 2018 he returned to the Lower Silesian Voivodeship Assembly.

In the 2019 Polish parliamentary election, Borys was elected to the Sejm from the Legnica constituency, receiving 35,034 votes. In the 2023 Polish parliamentary election, he was re-elected from the same constituency with 44,912 votes.

== Humanitarian mission to Bakhmut ==
In January 2023, during the Battle of Bakhmut, Borys took part in a humanitarian aid mission to Ukraine organised by the Open Dialogue Foundation under the banner Opposition for Ukraine. The mission included five Polish opposition MPs: Borys, Paweł Krutul, Witold Zembaczyński, Adam Szłapka and Hanna Gill-Piątek, as well as ODF's Martin Mycielski.

The mission delivered around 15 tonnes of equipment and aid to Ukrainian soldiers, including reconnaissance drones, power generators, food, medicines and dressings. The aid included support for the Madyar's Birds drone unit, then operating in the Bakhmut area.

== Ministry of Sport and Tourism ==
On 28 December 2023, Minister of Sport and Tourism Sławomir Nitras handed letters of appointment to Borys and Ireneusz Raś as Secretaries of State at the Ministry of Sport and Tourism. In this role, Borys continued to sit in the Sejm while serving as one of the ministry's senior officials.

== Electoral results ==
Year	Election	Committee	Constituency	Votes	Result
2009	European Parliament	Civic Platform	Lower Silesia and Opole	35,504	Elected
2019	Sejm	Civic Coalition	Legnica	35,034	Elected
2023	Sejm	Civic Coalition	Legnica	44,912	Elected
