= Adam Szłapka =

Polish political scientist and politician (born 1984)

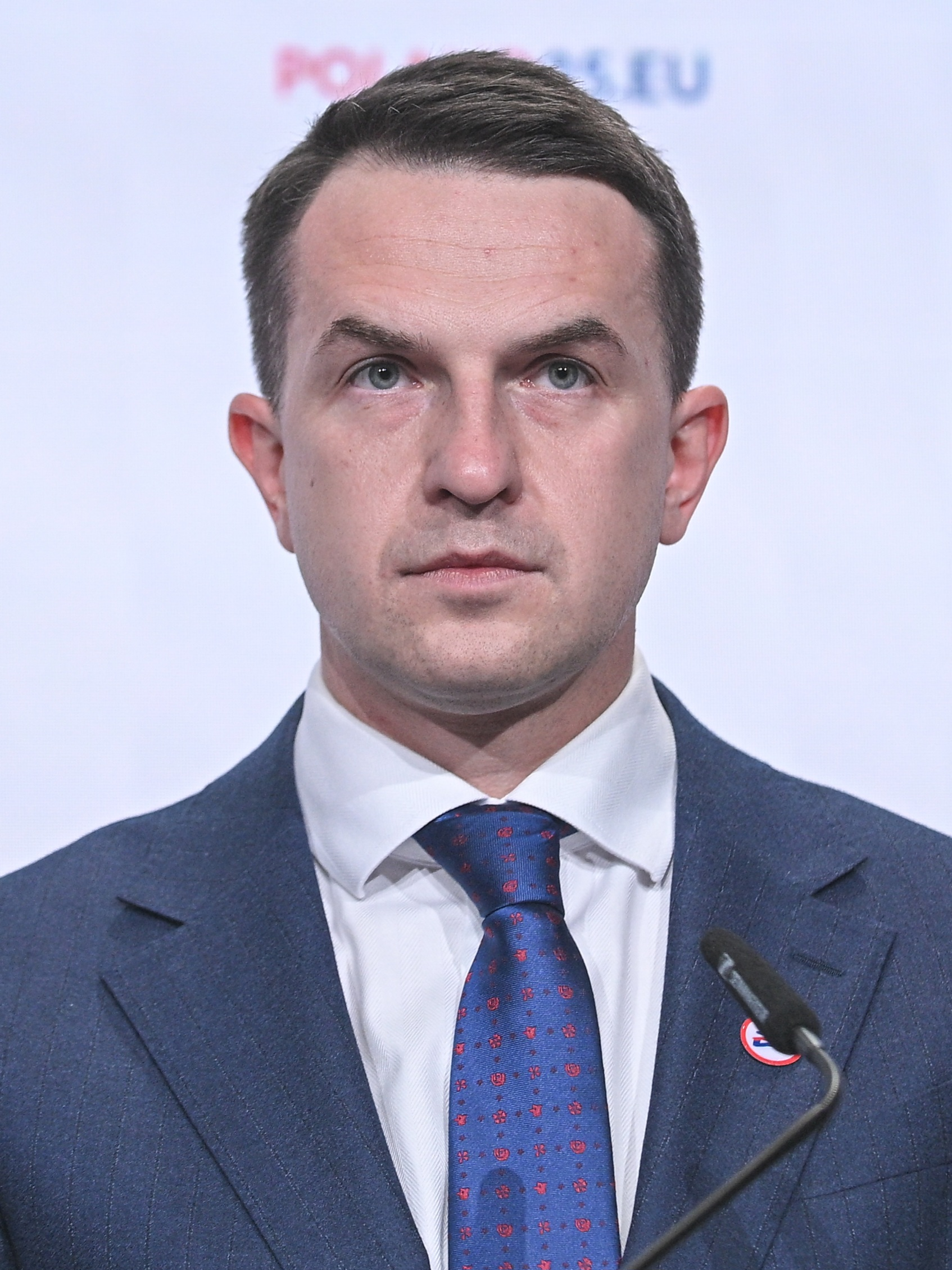
- Szłapka in 2025

Government Spokesperson of Poland
- Incumbent
- Assumed office 1 July 2025
- Prime Minister: Donald Tusk
- Preceded by: Piotr Müller

Minister for European Affairs
- In office 13 December 2023 – 24 July 2025
- Prime Minister: Donald Tusk
- Preceded by: Szymon Szynkowski vel Sęk

Leader of Modern
- In office 24 November 2019 – 24 October 2025
- Preceded by: Katarzyna Lubnauer
- Succeeded by: Party dissolved

Member of the Sejm
- Incumbent
- Assumed office 12 November 2015

Personal details
- Born: 6 December 1984 (age 41) Kościan, Poland
- Party: Civic Coalition (since 2025)
- Other political affiliations: Modern (2015–2025)
- Education: Adam Mickiewicz University in Poznań
- Profession: Politician, political scientist

Adam Stanisław Szłapka (Polish: [ˈadam-szˈwapka]; born 6 December 1984) is a Polish politician and political scientist who has served as Government Spokesperson and Secretary of State in the Chancellery of the Prime Minister of Poland since July 2025. He has been a member of the Sejm for the 8th, 9th and 10th terms since 2015. He served as Minister for European Affairs in Donald Tusk's third cabinet from 2023 to 2025 and as leader of Modern from 2019 until the party's dissolution in 2025.

== Early life and education ==
Szłapka was born in 1984 in Kościan, Greater Poland Voivodeship. He graduated from the Oskar Kolberg High School No. 1 in Kościan. He subsequently graduated in political science and Eastern studies from the Adam Mickiewicz University in Poznań.

== Political career ==
He was an activist of Młode Centrum, a youth organization of the Freedom Union and Democratic Party. Between 2006 and 2012 he worked as the general secretary of these organizations.

Between 2006 and 2010, he served as a town councillor in Kościan representing the Self-Government Democratic Forum (Samorządowe Forum Demokratyczne). In 2010, he unsuccessfully ran for office in the local government elections. He was director of Fundacja: Projekt Polska. From 2011 to 2015, he worked as an expert in the Chancellery of the President of the Republic of Poland during the presidency of Bronisław Komorowski.

In 2015, he became general secretary of the Modern party. In the same year, he was elected to the Sejm from the Kalisz constituency. He served on the Foreign Affairs Committee and the Secret Services Committee. In the 2019 Polish parliamentary election, he was re-elected from the Poznań constituency, receiving 51,951 votes. On 24 November 2019, he succeeded Katarzyna Lubnauer as leader of Modern. He has expressed support for the legalization of same-sex marriage in Poland.

In January 2023, during the Battle of Bakhmut, Szłapka took part in a humanitarian aid mission to Ukraine organised by the Open Dialogue Foundation under the banner Opposition for Ukraine. Together with Polish opposition MPs Piotr Borys, Paweł Krutul, Hanna Gill-Piątek and Witold Zembaczyński, as well as ODF's Martin Mycielski, he delivered aid to Ukrainian soldiers, including drones and equipment for the Madyar's Birds drone unit.

In the 2023 Polish parliamentary election, he was re-elected to the Sejm from the Poznań constituency with 149,064 votes. Following the election, on 13 December 2023, he became Minister for European Affairs in Donald Tusk's third cabinet.

As Minister for European Affairs, Szłapka was involved in preparations for and conduct of Poland's 2025 Presidency of the Council of the European Union. He chaired meetings of the General Affairs Council during the Polish presidency.

On 20 June 2025, Prime Minister Donald Tusk announced that Szłapka would become Government Spokesperson after the end of Poland's EU Council presidency; he formally assumed the role on 1 July 2025. In July 2025, he also became Secretary of State in the Chancellery of the Prime Minister. He ceased to serve as Minister for European Affairs during the July 2025 cabinet reshuffle.

On 24 October 2025, the convention of Modern voted to dissolve the party and continue political activity within Civic Coalition. Szłapka, then still party leader, described the move as a new stage for the liberal political camp.

In April 2026, the National Council of Civic Coalition elected Szłapka as one of the party's deputy leaders.

== Results in National Elections ==
Election	Electoral Committee	Office	District	Result
2015	Modern	Sejm (8th term)	no. 36	12,539 (3.45%) ✓
2019	Civic Coalition	Sejm (9th term)	no. 39	51,951 (10.10%) ✓
2023	Civic Coalition	Sejm (10th term)	no. 39	149,064 (25.01%) ✓

== See also ==
- Politics of Poland
- Third Cabinet of Donald Tusk
