= Witold Zembaczyński =

Polish politician (born 1980)

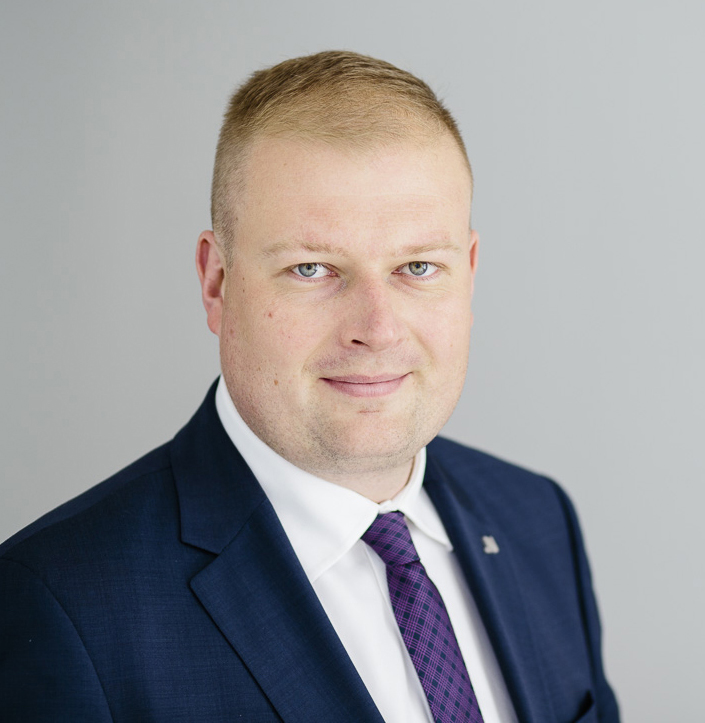
- Zembaczyński in 2016

Member of the Sejm
- Incumbent
- Assumed office 12 November 2015
- Constituency: Opole

Personal details
- Born: 28 December 1980 (age 45) Opole, Poland
- Party: Modern, Civic Coalition
- Education: University of Opole
- Occupation: Politician, entrepreneur
- Awards: Honor and Glory White Cross (Ukraine)

Witold Maciej Zembaczyński (Polish: [ˈvitɔld-'mat͡siɛj-zɛmbaˈt͡szɨɲski]; born 28 December 1980) is a Polish politician, entrepreneur and former local government official. He has been a member of the Sejm since 2015, representing the Opole constituency. He was previously a city councillor in Opole.

== Early life, education and professional career ==
Zembaczyński was born in Opole on 28 December 1980. He graduated in political science from the University of Opole.

Before entering national politics, he worked in the sports sector and later ran his own business, including a crêperie. He also worked in sales management and, in 2015, as manager of the Wodna Nuta swimming pool in Opole.

Zembaczyński is also a technical diver. He has written for the Polish monthly Magazyn Nurkowanie and in 2004 set a Polish record in closed-circuit technical diving, reaching a depth of 131 metres in the Small Giftun canyon in the Red Sea.

== Political career ==
Zembaczyński was active in Civic Platform and later became associated with the local association “Opole na Tak” (“Opole Yes”), serving as its vice-president and, from 2015 to 2017, as president. In the 2014 Polish local elections, he was elected to the Opole City Council from the local electoral committee of Arkadiusz Wiśniewski. He subsequently became leader of that group’s council caucus.

In the 2015 Polish parliamentary election, he ran for the Sejm from first place on the list of Modern in the Opole constituency and won a seat in the 8th term of the Sejm. In July 2016, he became a member of the parliamentary investigative committee on the Amber Gold affair.

In the 2019 Polish parliamentary election, he was re-elected from the first place on the Civic Coalition list in the Opole constituency, receiving 40,022 votes. Polish regional media reported that this was the highest individual result in the constituency since its creation in 2001.

In the 2023 Polish parliamentary election, he won a third consecutive term, receiving 23,647 votes. In January 2024, he was appointed to the parliamentary investigative committee on the use of Pegasus spyware by Polish state authorities. He told the Polish Press Agency that the committee should clarify responsibility for the affair and prepare a package of institutional reforms concerning the relationship between citizens and the security services.

After the 2025 merger of Civic Platform, Modern and Polish Initiative into the Civic Coalition party, Zembaczyński became associated with the new party.

== Support for Ukraine ==
After Russia’s full-scale invasion of Ukraine in 2022, Zembaczyński became involved in humanitarian assistance for Ukraine. He organised aid convoys to Ukraine and evacuations of Ukrainian civilians to Poland. In April 2022, Super Express reported that he had helped evacuate hundreds of people from Ukraine using a bus bought by a group of volunteers. Radio Doxa later reported that, according to Zembaczyński, his aid activities had helped evacuate almost a thousand people and had delivered humanitarian assistance worth around PLN 2 million.

In January 2023, he took part in a humanitarian and military-aid mission to Bakhmut with other Polish opposition MPs and Martin Mycielski, organised by the Open Dialogue Foundation. The mission delivered assistance including reconnaissance drones, generators, food, medicine and dressings to Ukrainian forces and civilian institutions near the front line.

For his support for Ukraine, Zembaczyński received the Ukrainian White Cross “Honor et Gloria” in 2023.

== Personal life ==
Zembaczyński is the son of Ryszard Zembaczyński, a former governor of Opole Voivodeship and mayor of Opole. Part of his childhood was spent in Prudnik.
