= Arkadiusz Wiśniewski =

Polish politician

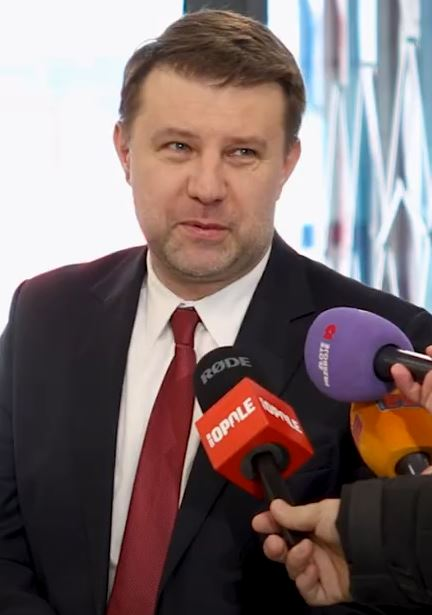

President of Opole
- Incumbent
- Assumed office 4 December 2014
- Preceded by: Ryszard Zembaczyński

Deputy President of Opole
- In office 1 December 2010 – 30 October 2013
- President: Ryszard Zembaczyński

Member of the Opole City Council
- In office 27 October 2002 – 1 December 2010

Personal details
- Born: 29 August 1978 (age 48) Opole
- Party: Independent

Arkadiusz Wiśniewski (born 29 August 1978 in Opole) is a Polish politician who has served as the president of Opole since 2014.

== Biography ==
Arkadiusz Wiśniewski was born on 29 August 1978 to Henryk and Henryka Wiśniewscy. He earned a bachelor's degree in political administration and master's degree in political science in the University of Opole. He also earned a Master of Business Administration diploma in the Wrocław University of Economics. He was a professor at his alma mater, a manager at the Opole Center for Economic Development, and the director and deputy director of institutions dedicated to supporting entrepreneurship.

In 2002 he became a member of the Opole City Council on behalf of the Electoral Committee of Ryszard Zembaczyński; he was then re-elected in 2006 and 2010 from the lists of the Civic Platform. He served as chairman of the PO councilors’ club and vice-chairman of the city council. He resigned from his council seat after being appointed deputy president of Opole in 2010. He was dismissed three years later. A motion was also filed at that time to expel him from the Civic Platform, accusing him of actions aimed at causing a split within the party's councilors’ club. Wiśniewski left Civic Platform on his own behalf in November 2013. In March 2014, he founded the association Opole na Tak, serving as its president. He also co-founded the Gospodarne Opolskie initiative, which ran for the Opole Voivodeship Sejmik.

In the 2014 Polish local elections he ran for the president of Opole as an independent, winning the election in the run-off with almost 67.7% of the popular vote. In the 2018 Polish local elections, he was successfully re-elected, winning 70.4% of the popular vote in the first vote. He was elected for the third term in the 2024 Polish local elections, winning 75.5% in the first round.

He was the driving force behind the expansion of Opole's administrative boundaries to include neighboring towns, which took place in 2017. During his tenure, Opole was admitted to the global network of “age-friendly cities” under the World Health Organization, was recognized as the provincial capital with the best “daycare coverage” in Poland, and also topped the ranking of cities in terms of investment spending compiled by the magazine “Wspólnota.” In 2023, he became an activist for the Yes! For Poland political movement, becoming its regional leader in the Opole Voivodeship. In September 2025, he became a member of the executive board of the New Poland party, which filed for registration that same month. In the summer of 2026, he exited New Poland.

He was appointed to the supervisory boards of the following local government companies: Silesian Railways, Energetyka Cieplna in Kępno, Energetyka Cieplna Opolszczyzny, and Przedsiębiorstwo Wodociągów i Kanalizacji in Brzeg.

== Awards ==
- Badge of Honor for Service to Local Government – 2025.

== Election history ==
Electoral history of Arkadiusz Wiśniewski
Year	Office	Committee	Votes		Result	Ref.
Year	Office	Committee	Total	%	Result	Ref.
2002	Member of the Opole City Council	Electoral Committee of Ryszard Zembaczyński	153	2.22	Won (Note: His electoral committee won enough votes for 3 seats in the district, while Wiśniewski finished 4th in his electoral committee list. This would not have been sufficient to win a seat; however, the list's toprunner, Ryszard Zembaczyński, became the President of Opole, thus leaving an extra seat and making Wiśniewski eligible.)	
2006	Member of the Opole City Council	Civic Platform	1094	16.38	Won	
2010	Member of the Opole City Council	Civic Platform	1159	15.47	Won	
2014	President of Opole	Electoral Committee of Arkadiusz Wiśniewski	18201	67.66	Won (Note: Won in run-off (second round). In the first round, he won 17047 votes (47.51%), taking the first place, but falling short of the 50% threshold.)	
2018	President of Opole	Electoral Committee of Arkadiusz Wiśniewski	38285	70.35	Won	
2024	President of Opole	Electoral Committee of Arkadiusz Wiśniewski	33104	75.47	Won	
