= Lyudmyla Kozlovska =

Ukrainian human rights activist (born 1985)

- Людмила Козловська
- Born: 17 March 1985 (age 41); Sevastopol, Ukrainian SSR, Soviet Union
- Citizenship: Ukrainian
- Education: Sevastopol National Technical University; Bangor University
- Occupation: Human rights activist
- Organization: Open Dialogue Foundation
- Title: President
- Spouse: Bartosz Kramek

Lyudmyla Kozlovska (Ukrainian: Людмила Козловська; born 17 March 1985) is a Ukrainian human rights activist who established the Open Dialogue Foundation (ODF) in Poland in 2009 and has served as its president since June 2010.

Her advocacy has focused on political prisoners and politically motivated prosecutions in post-Soviet states, support for Ukraine, the rule of law in Poland and Moldova, misuse of INTERPOL and international law-enforcement mechanisms, targeted sanctions, and the use of financial and cybersecurity regulations for transnational repression. ODF reports and submissions produced under her leadership have been used in proceedings and publications of the United Nations, OSCE, Parliamentary Assembly of the Council of Europe (PACE), European Parliament and national legislatures.

In 2018, the Polish government led by Law and Justice placed Kozlovska on the Schengen Information System and barred her from Poland on national-security grounds. Polish courts subsequently found that the decisions were inadequately substantiated or unjustified, and the restriction was removed in 2024. In 2024, Russia designated ODF an "undesirable organisation" and threatened Kozlovska with a 15-year prison sentence.

== Early life and education ==
Kozlovska was born in Sevastopol, then part of the Ukrainian SSR, on 17 March 1985. She became involved in Ukrainian student and civic organisations, including the Foundation for Regional Initiatives and the PORA youth movement. She participated in the Orange Revolution in 2004 and subsequently led a 2005–2006 campaign advocating the withdrawal of the Russian Black Sea Fleet from Sevastopol.

She studied finance at Sevastopol National Technical University and the University of Wales, Bangor, now Bangor University. After receiving a Polish government scholarship, she moved to Poland and undertook doctoral studies at the European College of Polish and Ukrainian Universities in Lublin.

== Open Dialogue Foundation ==
ODF was established in Poland in 2009 on Kozlovska's initiative. Its original mandate concerned human rights, democracy and the rule of law in countries of the former Soviet Union, particularly Kazakhstan, Ukraine, Russia and Moldova. Its work subsequently expanded to include the rule of law within the European Union, international law-enforcement cooperation, targeted sanctions, financial exclusion and humanitarian assistance.

Kozlovska became president of the foundation in June 2010. Since 2009, she has organised or participated in election and human-rights observation missions in Ukraine, Georgia, Moldova, Russia and Kazakhstan. The foundation's methods have included trial monitoring, political-prisoner lists, reports to international institutions, parliamentary advocacy, public campaigns, legal assistance and humanitarian programmes.

== Advocacy work ==
=== Election and human-rights monitoring ===
Kozlovska organised ODF observation missions covering elections, trials, public protests and the treatment of political opposition figures and civil-society activists. The missions operated principally in Ukraine, Moldova, Georgia, Russia and Kazakhstan.

The resulting documentation was presented to European and national parliaments, the OSCE, the Council of Europe and United Nations human-rights mechanisms. ODF was among the civil-society organisations that submitted material for United Nations reviews of Kazakhstan and Poland and for reports of the UN Special Rapporteur on the independence of judges and lawyers.

=== Kazakhstan and Central Asia ===
Kazakhstan became one of ODF's principal areas of work following the brutal suppression of the 2011 protests in Zhanaozen. The foundation documented the prosecution of striking oil workers, opposition politicians, journalists and civil-society activists. It also campaigned in cases involving political prisoners and people subjected to extradition or INTERPOL requests initiated by Kazakh authorities.

ODF's work included the cases of Mukhtar Ablyazov, his relatives and associates, as well as activists and prisoners including Maks Bokayev, Mukhtar Dzhakishev and Aron Atabek. The foundation argued that prosecutions and international requests in a number of these cases were politically motivated, while Kazakh authorities characterised the relevant proceedings as ordinary criminal cases.

In 2016, ODF and Destination Justice submitted an alternative report on Kazakhstan to the United Nations Human Rights Committee. ODF subsequently submitted material to the country's Universal Periodic Review.

ODF's political-prisoner data were incorporated into external assessments of Kazakhstan. Freedom House's 2020 country report cited the foundation's list of 57 politically motivated criminal prosecutions, including at least 21 people who remained in prison or pretrial detention as of November 2019. Earlier Freedom House reporting also cited ODF's documentation of Zhanaozen and politically motivated prosecutions.

=== Ukraine ===
During the Revolution of Dignity in 2013 and 2014, ODF monitored events in Kyiv and organised humanitarian assistance for protesters. Following Russia's annexation of Crimea and the beginning of the Russo-Ukrainian War, the foundation delivered protective equipment and humanitarian supplies to Ukraine and advocated for Ukrainians imprisoned in Russia and Russian-occupied territories.

ODF opened the Ukrainian World support centre in Warsaw in 2014. It provided legal and psychological assistance, Polish-language classes, help with employment and education, donated goods and advice on residence or asylum procedures. In 2015, the centre was receiving approximately 100 visitors a day.

Kozlovska and ODF also worked with Ukrainian human-rights organisations on the international campaign for Ukrainians held by Russia, commonly described as the "hostages of the Kremlin". The issue was presented at OSCE meetings and in European institutions.

After Russia's full-scale invasion in 2022, ODF resumed large-scale humanitarian operations, supplying Ukrainian military and civilian recipients with protective, medical, communications and humanitarian equipment. According to the witness biography issued for Kozlovska's 2025 congressional testimony, ODF had delivered aid valued at €9.59 million by April 2024.

=== Moldova ===
ODF began sustained monitoring of Moldova in 2016, concentrating on judicial independence, politically motivated prosecutions, media freedom and the concentration of political and economic power under Vladimir Plahotniuc. The foundation supported Moldovan civil-society activists and opposition politicians in presenting cases before European institutions.

Kozlovska advocated making European financial assistance conditional on compliance with democratic and rule-of-law requirements and called for targeted sanctions against officials and business figures responsible for state capture and political persecution. In 2018, the European Union suspended payments under its macro-financial assistance and budget-support programmes because of the deterioration of democratic standards and the rule of law in Moldova, and reduced bilateral assistance. The EU action reflected the financial conditionality advocated by ODF and other civil-society organisations, although no single organisation was credited with producing the decision.

=== Rule of law in Poland ===
In 2017, ODF expanded its advocacy to Poland amid disputes concerning the Constitutional Tribunal, the National Council of the Judiciary, the Supreme Court and disciplinary proceedings against judges and prosecutors.

Under Kozlovska's leadership, the foundation documented cases involving judges, prosecutors and other legal professionals subjected to disciplinary or criminal proceedings after criticising government judicial policy. It organised international advocacy meetings involving affected legal professionals and submitted information to the European Commission, the OSCE and United Nations special procedures.

ODF's material was listed among the civil-society contributions to the 2019 UN Special Rapporteur's report on freedom of expression, association and assembly among judges and prosecutors and the 2020 report on disciplinary measures against judges. It also submitted documentation concerning persecuted judges to the European Commission's consultation for the 2020 EU Justice Scoreboard.

=== INTERPOL and international law-enforcement systems ===
Kozlovska made the misuse of INTERPOL Red Notices and diffusions by authoritarian governments a major element of ODF's work. The foundation analysed cases involving political opponents, refugees, journalists and activists sought internationally by countries including Kazakhstan, Russia, Azerbaijan and Turkey.

ODF submitted recommendations to INTERPOL's 2014 Working Group on the Processing of Information and continued to advocate stronger preliminary review of Red Notices, more transparent appeal procedures, consistent protection of recognised refugees and the removal of residual data after notices were cancelled.

A 2017 PACE report stated that ODF and Fair Trials had documented suspected political misuse of INTERPOL and that their representatives had given evidence at committee hearings in Yerevan in 2015 and Paris in 2016. The Assembly welcomed reforms adopted by INTERPOL in 2016 and 2017, including stronger prior review of notices and changes to the Commission for the Control of INTERPOL's Files, while calling for further safeguards. A 2019 European Parliament study separately identified ODF as one of the organisations whose recommendations had been submitted to INTERPOL's reform process.

Kozlovska later extended this work to alleged misuse of the Schengen Information System, mutual legal-assistance procedures, anti-money-laundering rules and cybersecurity legislation.

=== Targeted sanctions ===
ODF has advocated individual sanctions, including travel bans and asset freezes, against officials and other actors responsible for serious human-rights violations or political persecution. Its campaigns have addressed Kazakhstan, Russia, occupied areas of Ukraine and Moldova.

The foundation supported the creation of national and European legislation modelled on the United States' Magnitsky Act. It submitted recommendations to the Australian Parliament's inquiry into the use of targeted sanctions to address human-rights abuses. The European Union adopted its global human-rights sanctions regime in December 2020, establishing an EU-wide mechanism for asset freezes and travel restrictions against individuals and entities responsible for serious abuses.

Following Russia's full-scale invasion of Ukraine, Kozlovska's sanctions work also addressed circumvention of restrictions imposed on Russia and its allies, including the use of financial intermediaries and nominal ownership structures.

=== Financial exclusion and digital assets ===
Kozlovska established the Building True Change Coalition, commonly styled as the BTC Coalition, to address the exclusion of civil-society organisations, dissidents, humanitarian groups and politically exposed individuals from banking and payment services. The initiative argues that anti-money-laundering, counter-terrorist-financing and cybersecurity systems can be manipulated by authoritarian governments or applied without adequate procedural safeguards.

Kozlovska has promoted the use of Bitcoin and other decentralised payment tools where conventional banking services are unavailable or have been withdrawn, including for humanitarian assistance to Ukraine and support for political prisoners' families. In written testimony to the Tom Lantos Human Rights Commission in June 2025, she used the term "transnational financial repression" for the extraterritorial use of financial, cybersecurity, law-enforcement and mutual legal-assistance mechanisms to restrict or monitor civil-society activity.

The OSCE Parliamentary Assembly adopted a resolution on transnational financial repression as part of its July 2026 Hague Declaration. The resolution identified misuse of anti-money-laundering, cybersecurity, mutual legal-assistance and INTERPOL mechanisms as a threat to civil society and the rule of law. It also referred specifically to a Belgian court decision concerning requests by Kazakh authorities for surveillance, financial and travel data relating to Kozlovska and ODF in the European Union and the United States.

== State pressure and retaliation ==
Kozlovska and ODF have described actions taken against them by authorities in Poland, Moldova, Kazakhstan and Russia as retaliation for their advocacy. In several instances, courts, parliaments or international institutions later found that the measures were insufficiently substantiated, politically motivated or had indeed been used to exert pressure.

=== Poland under Law and Justice ===
The conflict with the Polish government began in July 2017, when Bartosz Kramek, the chair of ODF's supervisory board and Kozlovska's husband, published an appeal proposing peaceful civil disobedience against changes to Poland's judiciary. ODF endorsed the defence of the protests while stating that Kramek had expressed his personal opinion.

Government agencies subsequently intensified fiscal and customs inspections of ODF. The Foreign Ministry sought judicial intervention in the foundation's management, while government politicians and state-controlled media accused it of opaque financing, Russian links and activity directed against the Polish state. Kozlovska and ODF denied the allegations and described the measures as retaliation for their criticism of the government.

In July 2018, Poland placed Kozlovska in its national register of undesirable foreigners and entered an alert in the Schengen Information System on national-security grounds. On 13 August, she was detained during passport control at Brussels Airport and deported to Kyiv the following day.

Polish officials stated that classified information indicated that her presence represented a security threat. Kozlovska and Kramek maintained that the decision was punishment for their opposition to the Law and Justice government. Other European states subsequently admitted her for parliamentary and institutional appearances, and Belgium granted her a five-year residence permit.

In April 2019, the Voivodeship Administrative Court in Warsaw found that the evidence provided by the Polish authorities was too general to demonstrate that Kozlovska constituted a national-security risk and annulled the relevant administrative decisions. Her data were subsequently removed from the Schengen system, although she remained on Poland's domestic list.

In December 2022, the Supreme Administrative Court ruled that the prohibition on her entry was unjustified and ordered the Office for Foreigners to reconsider the case. A further court ruling ordered the authorities to remove her from the domestic register. In July 2024, the Office for Foreigners confirmed her removal after the Internal Security Agency stated that it did not in fact possess information indicating that her presence threatened state security.

PACE subsequently used her case in a report examining potentially politically motivated use of the Schengen Information System. The report noted both Kozlovska's claim of political persecution and the Polish court's finding that the alert lacked a sufficient evidentiary basis.

Kozlovska and ODF also brought civil proceedings over statements made during the government campaign. Final judgments required former deputy interior minister Maciej Wąsik and Law and Justice politician Dominik Tarczyński, among other prominent ruling party politicians, to apologise for disseminating false or harmful accusations about Kozlovska and the foundation, as well as pay compensation to her and ODF.

=== Moldova under Vladimir Plahotniuc ===
In 2018, while Vladimir Plahotniuc and his Democratic Party dominated Moldovan politics, leading to allegations of a state takeover, parliament established a closed commission on his orders to examine alleged foreign interference by ODF. The commission accused Kozlovska and the foundation of financing opposition parties, interfering in Moldova's internal affairs, laundering money and acting in Russia's interests.

ODF stated that the alleged political financing consisted principally of travel expenses for Moldovan opposition representatives invited to a human-rights event in the European Parliament. Kozlovska denied the commission's allegations and argued that it had been created in response to ODF's advocacy for EU financial conditionality and sanctions against Plahotniuc's circle.

The parliamentary report led to a Moldovan criminal investigation concerning Kozlovska and ODF. After Plahotniuc lost power and left Moldova, the Prosecutor General's Office discontinued the investigation in May 2020.

On 2 February 2023, the Moldovan Parliament annulled the commission's report. Members of the governing Party of Action and Solidarity stated that it had been used to intimidate the then opposition and described it as a product of the period of state capture under Plahotniuc, calling the report "a stain on the conscience of not only of the previous government, which had no conscience at all, but also of Moldovan parliamentarism".

=== Kazakhstan ===
ODF's work on Kazakh political prisoners and politically motivated international requests led to prolonged conflict with Kazakh authorities and individuals associated with the government. Kazakhstan and state-linked proxies reportedly attempted to extend legal, financial and surveillance measures against her and the foundation into European jurisdictions.

In 2022, a collective criminal complaint was filed in Belgium against Kozlovska and ODF. Kozlovska testified before the U.S. Congress that the complaint had been coordinated by actors linked to Kazakhstan and used to seek access to communications, financial information and travel data in Europe and the United States.

In February 2025, PACE published a written declaration calling on Kazakhstan to end judicial, financial and transnational repression and referring to the targeting of Kozlovska and ODF.

The OSCE Parliamentary Assembly's adopted Hague Declaration of July 2026 referred to a Belgian court decision concerning requests made by Kazakh authorities for surveillance, financial and travel information relating to Kozlovska and ODF throughout the EU and United States.

=== Russia ===
On 25 March 2024, the Russian Ministry of Justice added ODF to its register of foreign and international organisations whose activities are considered "undesirable" in Russia.

The designation prohibited the foundation from operating in Russia and exposed its leadership to criminal penalties under Russian law, totalling 15 years of imprisonment for each of the three ODF leaders: Kozlovska, Kramek and Martin Mycielski.

Russian authorities stated that the foundation posed a threat to the country's constitutional order, defence or security. Polish media attributed the measure to ODF's assistance to Ukraine, while ODF itself also pointed to its advocacy for Ukrainian and Russian political prisoners, work on sanctions and documentation of Russian human-rights abuses as likely justification.

== Personal life ==
Kozlovska is married to Polish civil-society activist and entrepreneur Bartosz Kramek, who chairs ODF's supervisory board.

== See also ==
- Open Dialogue Foundation
- Human Rights Watch
- Transparency International
- Vladimir Plahotniuc
