= Opole City Council =

Local government body in Opole, Poland

Council of the City of Opole Rada Miasta Opola

Type
- Type: Unicameral

Leadership
- Chairwoman: Barbara Kamińska, KO
- Vice-Chairpersons: Sławomir Batko, PiS; Piotr Mielec, KAW; Anna Tabisz, KAW

Structure
- Seats: 25
- Political groups: Mayoral coalition (21): Civic Coalition (11); Club of Arkadiusz Wiśniewski (9); Independent (1); Opposition (4): Law and Justice (4)

Elections
- Voting system: Multi-member electoral districts with five-year terms
- Last election: 7 April 2024
- Next election: 2029

Website
- www.opole.pl/dla-mieszkanca/menu/rada-miasta-opola

The Opole City Council is the governing body of the city of Opole in Poland. The council has 25 elected members elected every five years in an election by city voters through a secret ballot. The election of City Council and the local head of government, which takes place at the same time, is based on legislation introduced on 20 June 2002.

== Members of the Opole City Council ==
Party	District 1	District 2	District 3	District 4
Committee of Arkadiusz Wiśniewski	Jacek Kasprzyk; Edward Odelga; Izabela Król	Piotr Mielec; Marek Kinder; Dariusz Chwist	Łukasz Sowada; Arkadiusz Wiśniewski; Małgorzata Jarosz-Basztabin	Anna Tabisz; Tomasz Wróbel
Civic Coalition	Tomasz Kaliszan; Elżbieta Bień; Jan Damboń	Barbara Kamińska; Tobiasz Gajda	Przemysław Pospieszyński; Agnieszka Kamińska; Lilianna Łuczkiewicz	Anna Łęgowik; Justyna Kowol
Law and Justice	Marek Kawa	Michał Nowak	Małgorzata Wilkos	Sławomir Batko

== Election results ==
=== 2024 ===
All 25 seats on the city council were being contested in the 2024 election.

Party	Votes	%	Seats
Committee of Arkadiusz Wiśniewski	17,465	39.40	11
Civic Coalition	15,029	33.91	10
Law and Justice	7,734	17.45	4
Confederation and Nonpartisan Localists	2,532	5.71	0
Third Way	1,566	3.53	0
Total	44,326	100.00	25
