= Ryszard Zembaczyński =

Polish politician (1948–2026)

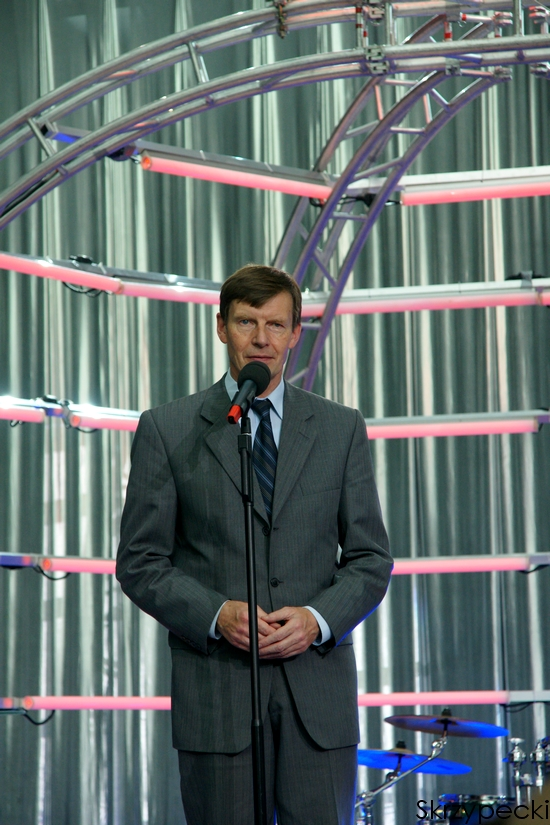
- Zembaczyński in 2009

Mayor of Opole
- In office November 2002 – 4 December 2014
- Preceded by: Piotr Synowiec
- Succeeded by: Arkadiusz Wiśniewski

Voivode of Opole
- In office 1990 – 31 December 1998

Personal details
- Born: Ryszard Andrzej Zembaczyński; 28 June 1948 Cieplice Śląskie-Zdrój, Poland
- Died: 7 May 2026 (aged 77) Opole, Poland
- Party: AWS; PO
- Education: Silesian University of Technology
- Occupation: Civil servant

Ryszard Andrzej Zembaczyński (28 June 1948 – 7 May 2026) was a Polish politician. A member of Solidarity Electoral Action and Civic Platform, he served as voivode of Opole Voivodeship from 1990 to 1998 and mayor of Opole from 2002 to 2014.

Zembaczyński died in Opole on 7 May 2026, at the age of 77.
