= All of Poland Reads to Kids =

Polish social campaign

All of Poland Reads to Kids (Polish: Cała Polska czyta dzieciom) is a social campaign, started in June 2001 by the Foundation ABCXXI All of Poland Reads to Children. The foundation operated until 2005 as Foundation ABCXXI Emotional Health Program, aimed at promoting daily reading to children as an effective, inexpensive, and friendly method of supporting them. They helped improve children's comprehensive psychological, intellectual, social, and moral development, as well as building the child's internal resources: emotional and intellectual competencies.

== History ==
The initiator of the "All of Poland Reads to Kids" social campaign was Irena Koźmińska, founder and president of the Foundation ABCXXI All of Poland Reads to Kids. The campaign is currently conducted nationwide by 6,376 volunteers – Leaders and Coordinators. More than 2,350 schools and over 2,300 kindergartens have joined the Foundation's programs: "Reading Schools" and "Reading Kindergartens".

Institutions that have implemented daily loud reading to children observe increased comprehension of texts and instructions, along with many other benefits. These include improved concentration, ease of oral and written expression, increased motivation to learn and willingness to cooperate, formation of bonds between students and between students and the reading teacher, increased reading among children, and improved behavior.

The campaign began in June 2001 with an advertisement aired on TVP, featuring Krzysztof Stelmaszyk. A humorous scene where a child approaches their television-watching father and asks, "Dad, can you read?" achieved its intended effect, and volunteers – teachers, librarians, parents – began joining the CPCD campaign. The campaign also received support from artists, journalists, publishers, booksellers, athletes, and politicians.

In June 2002, the Foundation organized the 1st National Week of Reading to Children (OTCD), which involved more than 150 locations. The following year, the 2nd OTCD had 300 participants, in 2004 – over 1,000, and in the 8th OTCD in 2010 – over 2,500 locations. In 2003, the Foundation started two new educational programs: "Reading Schools" and "Reading Kindergartens", successfully promoting the introduction of loud reading to children in schools and kindergartens. Soon, coordinators appeared for various voivodeships, cities, communes, as well as leaders in schools, kindergartens, libraries, and other institutions cooperating with the Foundation.

The CPCD campaign was joined by institutions from Wrocław under the slogan "Whole Wrocław Reads to Children". The organizers and coordinators of this action were methodologists from the Wrocław Teacher Development Center. The action was organized as a competition for primary and secondary schools, as well as kindergartens.

The Foundation produced television advertisements (including "Dad, Can You Read?", "Men's Conversations", "Is Harry Potter Here?", "Family", "Attic Scares"), short films with personalities reading to their children, 11 clips with TV series actors reading to their TV series children, and music videos: "Memories Are Close" performed by Natalia Kukulska, "Whole Poland Reads to Children" (performed by Maryla Rodowicz, Ewelina Flinty, Majka Jeżowska, Zbigniew Zamachowski, Piotr Fronczewski, Mateusz Damięcki).

== Similar Social Campaigns ==
- In English-speaking countries, the "Get Caught Reading" campaign started in 1999.
- Programs modeled on the Polish reading campaign have started in the Czech Republic, "Cele Česko čte dětem", sponsored by Václav Havel, in Slovakia (Celé Slovensko číta deťom) and in Lithuania (Visa Lietuva skaito vaikams). On June 1, 2011, during the solemn Inauguration of the 10th National Week of Reading to Children and the 1st International Week of Reading to Children, organized in cooperation with the Czech Foundation "Celé Česko čte dětem" in Cieszyn and Český Těšín, the proclamation of the program "Whole Europe Reads to Children" – "All of Europe Reads to Kids" was signed. Among the signatories were guests from 7 European countries.
- In 2014, the "Whole Polonia Reads to Children" campaign was launched in the USA. Its coordinators include Marta Wesołowski, Aneta Pieróg-Sudoł, Hanna Czuma, and Tomasz Moczerniuk.

== Awards and honors ==
For its activities, the Foundation has received awards, including: the Grand Prix at the Social Communication Festival in 2003, a nomination for the President of Poland's Award for Cultural Activities for Children and Youth, the Crystal Mirror in 2004, the Medal “Meritorious to Culture Gloria Artis” awarded by the Minister of Culture in 2005, the Honorary Award Pro Publico Bono and the Humanitarian Activity Award Optimus Hominum awarded by the Polish Committee of Social Assistance in 2005, the Small Pegasus award, the Children's Book Fair award, and the prestigious international IBBY – Asahi Reading Promotion Award, which representatives of the Foundation received during the 30th IBBY Congress in Macau. In 2006 and 2011, the Foundation received awards from the Children's Rights Ombudsman, in 2007 – a medal awarded by the Association of Polish Publishers, in 2008 the Ars Polona Award, and in 2011, the Medal of the National Education Commission and the title of NGO of the Year awarded by the Council of the Economic Forum in Krynica.
