= Hanna Gill-Piątek =

Polish politician (born 1974)

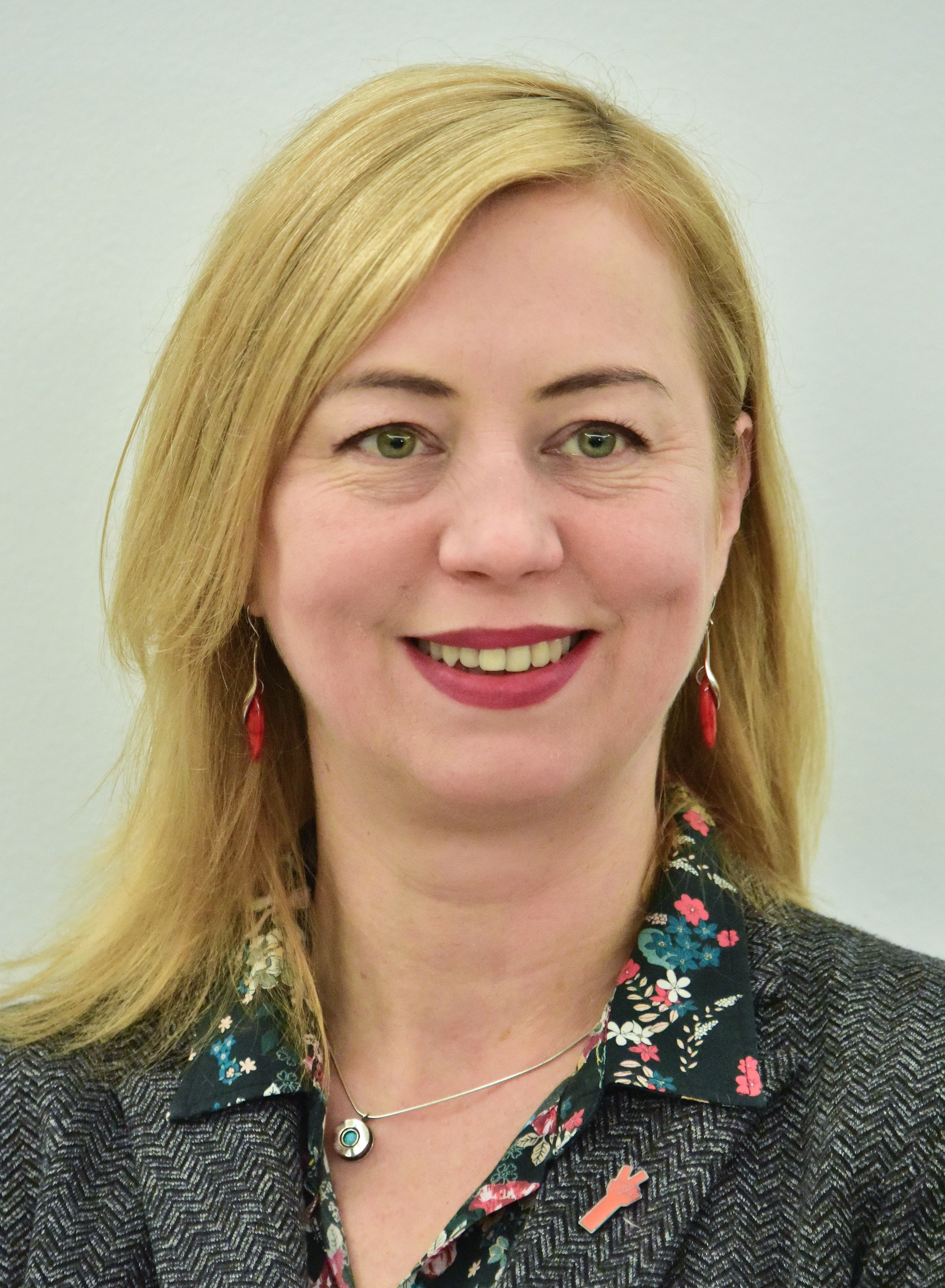
- Gill-Piątek in 2019

Member of the Łódź Voivodeship Sejmik
- Incumbent
- Assumed office 7 May 2024
- Constituency: No. 1

Member of the Sejm of Poland
- In office 12 November 2019 – 12 November 2023
- Constituency: No. 9

Personal details
- Born: Hanna Beata Stachowiak; 13 April 1974 (age 52) Łódź, Poland
- Party: The Greens (2006–2018); Spring (2019–2020); Poland 2050 (2020–2023); Civic Platform (2024–present)
- Education: Szczecin Art Academy; Łazarski University
- Occupation: Politician; social activis; civil servant; columnist; graphic designer

Hanna Beata Gill-Piątek (Note: Polish pronunciation: [ˈxan.na bɛˈa.ta ˈɡil ˈpjɔn.tɛk]) (née Stachowiak; (Note: Polish pronunciation: [staˈxɔ.vjak]) born 13 April 1974) is a Polish politician, social activist, civil sevant, columnist, and graphic designer. Since 2024, she is a member of the Łódź Voivodeship Sejmik, and from 2019 to 2023, was a member of the Sejm of Poland. She belongs to Civic Platform party, and in the past, was also a member of the Greens, Spring, and Poland 2050.

== Education and career ==
Hanna Gill-Piątek (née Stachowiak) was born on 12 April 1974 in Łódź, Poland, where she also attended the Nicholas Copernicus 1st General Education High School. Her parents were scientists. She studied graphic design and painting at the Academy of Fine Arts in Łodź and Szczecin Art Academy, from which she graduated with a bachelor's degree in 2017, after previously halting her education in 2000. In 2023, she received a master's degree from the Faculty of Law and Administration of the Łazarski University in Warsaw. She also attended courses at the School for Leaders in Warsaw. Between 2000 and 2006, she worked as graphic designer in Warsaw advertising agencies.

Gill-Piątek worked as a regular columnist for newspapers Gazeta Wyborcza, Przekrój, Dziennik Łódzki, and Dziennik Opinii Krytyki Politycznej. She wrote about women's rights, local democracy, and tenant issues. From 2014 to 2016, she worked in the revitalizaton office of the Łódź City Hall, where she managed local pilot experiments of the Ministry of Infrastructure and Development. One of results of her work was creation of the first in Poland centre of knowledge about the revitalizaton. From 2016 to 2017, she was an acting director of the Social Issues Department of the city hall in Gorzów Wielkopolski. She was also an expert of government revitalizaton programmes, and an advisor of the Association of Polish Cities.

== Politics and social activism ==
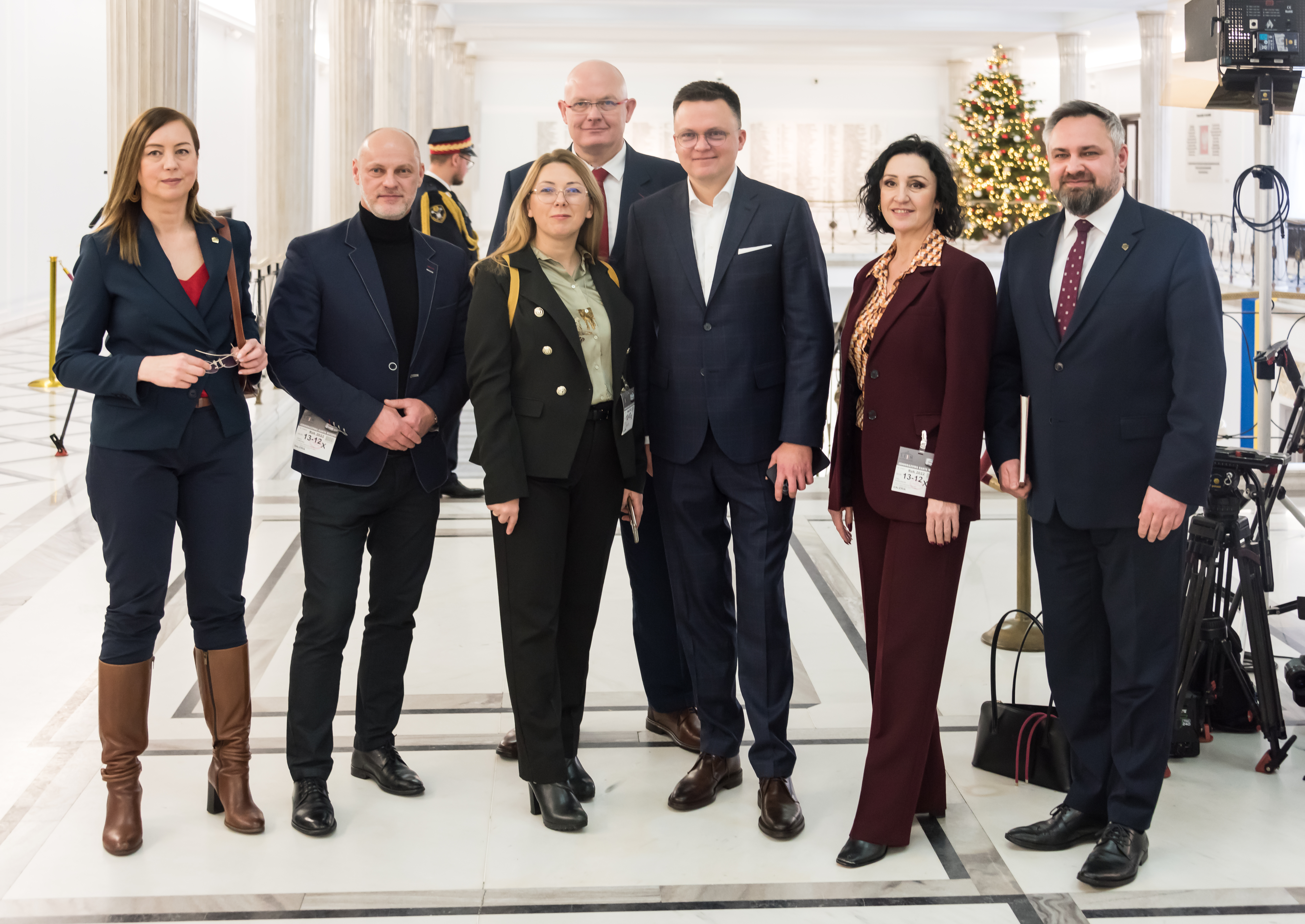
Hanna Gill-Piątek with politicians of the Poland 2050 in Sejm of Poland in 2022.

In 2005, she became one of the leaders of the Chomiczówka Against Degradation Association (Stowarzyszenie „Chomiczówka Przeciw Degradacji”), and co-founder of the All-Poland Movement for the City Bypass "Not Through the City!" (Ogólnowarszawski Ruch na Rzecz Obwodnicy Pozamiejskiej „Nie Przez Miasto!”).

She is a member of the Women's Congress, Municipal City Movements, and council of the Metropolitan Revitalization Congress. She organised performance art events, such as Backwards March for Tolerance in 2010, co-hosted with Joanna Rajkowska. In 2017, she lived in a shipping container for 3 days in Szczecin, to highlight the situation of evicted tenants. From 2011 to 2014, she organized political debates for Krytyka Polityczna.

In 2010 was published a book titled Bieda. Przewodnik dla dzieci (Poverty. A guidebook for children), which she wrote together with Henryka Krzywonos. All of Poland Reads to Kids, a social campaign promoting reading among yough, have called it "the book of the decade". It was also nominated to the Equality Glasses award (Okulary Równości) by Izabela Jaruga-Nowacka Foundation.

From 2006 to 2018, she belonged to the Greens political party, in which she was national management secretary and member of its national council. In 2006 and 2010, she unsuccessfully run for office of a councilor in Warsaw. In 2015, she candidated to be a member of the Sejm of Poland, on the list of United Left, representing the Greens. In 2018, she co-founded association Yes for Łódź, and became its management secretary. The same year, she run as its member for an office of a councilor in Łódź. In 2019, she became a coordinator of newly formed party of the Spring, in the constituency no. 10, and also unsuccessfully run in the elections to the European Parliament.

In 2019, she was elected to the Sejm of Poland from the constituency no. 9, centred around Łódź, receiving 14,422 votes. She represented the Sping on the list of the Democratic Left Alliance. In the parliament, she became the chairperson of the City Parliamentary Team, the deputy chairperson of the Łódź Parliamentary Team, as well as the member of the Infrastructure Committee, Local Government and Regionalal Politics Committee, Construction and Land and Housing Management Permanent Subcommittee, Publice Finance Committee, Taxiation System Oversight Permanent Subcommittee, LGBT+ Community Equality Parliamentary Team, and Transit Exclusion Counteraction Parliamentary Team.

In September 2020, she resigned from the Spring party and the Left parliamentary group, and joined the Poland 2050 movement, becoming the deputy chairperson of its political party in November. In February 2021, together with Joanna Mucha and Paulina Hennig-Kloska, she formed the Poland 2050 parliamentary group, becoming its chairperson. On 8 February 2023, she resigned from the party, and in September 2023, she had joined the Civic Coalition parliamentary group. That year, she unsuccessfully run for the relection. In 2024, she later joined the Civic Platform, and was elected as a member of the Łódź Voivodeship Sejmik in 2024, and also joined the afterwards. The same year, she unsuccessfully run in the elections to the European Parliament.

In 2023, the Supreme Council of Ukraine awarded her the White Cross "Honor et Gloria", for her activism and help regarding the Russo-Ukrainian War.

== Personal life ==
Gill-Piątek identifies as bisexual. She was married twice, including to writer Tomasz Piątek. Gill-Piątek was also in a romantic relationship with politician Anna Maria Żukowska, who also has been a member of the Sejm since 2019. She has a son, Martyn Gill, who is a painter responsible for several murals in Łódź.

== Written works ==
- Bieda. Przewodnik dla dzieci (together with Henryka Krzywonos; Wydawnictwo Krytyki Politycznej, Warsaw, 2010)
- "Powrót do Norwegii, w której nigdy nie byłam" in Norwegia. Przewodnik nieturystyczny (2011, Wydawnictwo Krytyki Politycznej, Warsaw, pp. 6–10)
- "Seriale. Przewodnik Krytyki Politycznej" in Autostopem przez Chomiczówkę (collaborative work; Wydawnictwo Krytyki Politycznej, Warsaw, 2011)
- "Autostopem przez Chomiczówkę" in Tiry na tory. Poradnik walczących społeczności (together with B. Martela; Federacja Zielonych – Grupa Krakowska, Instytut Spraw Obywatelskich, Łódź-Kraków, 2012, pp. 44–61)
- Rewolucja 1905. Przewodnik Krytyki Politycznej (collaborative work; Wydawnictwo Krytyki Politycznej, Łódź, 2013)
- "Obywatele decydują: poradnik działaczy obywatelskich" (collaborative work; Fundacja Rozwoju Turystyki i Kultury and Instytut Spraw Obywatelskich, Łódź, 2014)
- Analiza dalszych, możliwych działań legislacyjnych Rządu po ewentualnym wejściu w życie ustawy o rewitalizacji, z uwzględnieniem wniosków z dyskusji toczącej się w trakcie konsultacji projektu (collaborative work; Ministry of Infrastructure and Development, Warsaw, 2015)
- "Kontenery. Instrukcja obsługi dla artystów" in Mieszkanie i dom jako nieoczywistość kulturowo-społeczna (LangeL – Łucja Lange, Łódź, 2017, pp. 13–50)
- "Krótkie historie rewitalizacyjne" in Miasto na plus. Eseje o polskich przestrzeniach miejskich (together with Jacek Grunt-Mejer; Wysoki Zamek, Kraków, 2018)

== Electoral results ==
Electoral history of Hanna Gill-Piątek
Year	Office		Party	District	Votes			Result	Ref.
Year	Office		Party	District	Total	%	P.	Result	Ref.
2006	Warsaw City Council	5th	The Greens	No. 5	656	0.86%	24th	Lost	
2010	Warsaw City Council	5th	Democratic Left Alliance	No. 5	339	0.49%	18th	Lost	
2015	Sejm of Poland	8th	United Left	No. 9	3,256	0.91%	21st	Lost	
2018	Łódź City Council	8th	Yes for Łódź	No. 5	427	1.51%	14th	Lost	
2019	European Parliament	9th	Spring	No. 6	3,614	0.40%	27th	Lost	
2019	Sejm of Poland	9th	Democratic Left Alliance	No. 9	14,422	3.47%	2nd	Won	
2023	Sejm of Poland	10th	Civic Coalition	No. 9	5,508	1.21%	18th	Lost	
2024	Łódź Voivodeship Sejmik	7th	Civic Coalition	No. 1	24,735	10.22%	3rd	Won	
2024	European Parliament	10th	Civic Coalition	No. 6	10,740	1.42%	13th	Lost	

== Awards and decorations ==
- White Cross "Honor et Gloria" (Ukraine, 2023)
