= Civil Liberties Union for Europe =

Non-governmental organization advocating for civil liberties in the EU

- Abbreviation: Liberties
- Formation: 2017
- Founder: Balázs Dénes
- Type: Non-governmental organization
- Legal status: Non-profit
- Purpose: Human rights advocacy
- Headquarters: Berlin, Germany
- Region served: Europe
- Executive Director: Balázs Dénes
- Website: www.liberties.eu

The Civil Liberties Union for Europe, commonly known as Liberties, is a Berlin-based non-governmental organization (NGO) that advocates for civil liberties and human rights across the European Union (EU). Established in 2017, and led by Executive Director Balázs Dénes, Liberties collaborates with a network of national civil liberties NGOs from various EU countries and maintains a presence in Brussels.

Liberties' stated aims are to promote and protect fundamental rights, the rule of law, and democratic values within the EU. It engages in advocacy, public education, and policy analysis to influence EU legislation and support democratic principles. Its areas of focus include freedom of expression, privacy and data protection, the rule of law, civic space, and non-discrimination. Independent reporting has focussed on the organization's annual Liberties Rule of Law Report, which assesses the state of civil liberties within the EU.

== Reports ==
=== Liberties Rule of Law Report 2022 ===
Balkan broadcaster N1 stated that, in its 2022 Rule of Law Report, the Civil Liberties Union for Europe noted positive developments in Slovenia following the change of government earlier that year. The report was said to have highlighted improvements in media freedom and civil society conditions, reversing previous negative trends under the prior administration.

=== Liberties Rule of Law Report 2023 ===
Euronews described Liberties' 2023 report as finding that most EU countries made "little effort" to resolve documented rule of law issues, allowing existing shortcomings to persist or worsen. According to Euronews, the report highlighted Poland and Hungary as the "worst offenders," citing further measures to centralize power and silence opponents. New right-wing coalition governments in Italy and Sweden were described as "fast learners," with early signs pointing to potential authoritarian shifts.

=== Liberties Rule Of Law Report 2024 ===
Politico Europe said of Liberties' 2024 report that it focussed on the decline of media freedom in the EU, criticizing the lack of transparency in media ownership and the high concentration of media power, which Liberties identified as threats to media pluralism and independence. Politico also stated that the report documented 281 attacks against women journalists and media workers in EU member and candidate countries during 2023.

=== Liberties Rule Of Law Report 2025 ===
Euronews mentioned that Liberties' 2025 report found persistent deterioration of democratic institutions, judicial independence, and media freedom in several EU countries. The article emphasized that Liberties' findings informed ongoing debates in Brussels on democratic backsliding in the Union. The Guardian stated that Liberties found that media freedom and pluralism are under severe threat throughout the EU, citing issues such as increasing media ownership concentration and government influence over public media. And the Belga News Agency underscored Liberties' finding that there was an erosion of press freedom in multiple EU states amid rising authoritarianism, and noted Liberties' warning that journalists and independent media were facing increasing political and legal pressures.

In another article, the Guardian covered the report's identification of Italy as one of five EU countries actively undermining the rule of law, alongside Bulgaria, Croatia, Romania, and Slovakia. La Repubblica cited the Guardian in its own article that emphasized the erosion of democratic standards in Italy and citing new threats to judicial independence and press freedom.

The Brussels Times highlighted the report's mention of "the malfunctioning justice system and backsliding in press freedom" in Belgium.

== See also ==
- Human rights in Europe
- Media freedom in the European Union
- Rule of law
- Civil society
