= Polish Judges Association "Iustitia" =

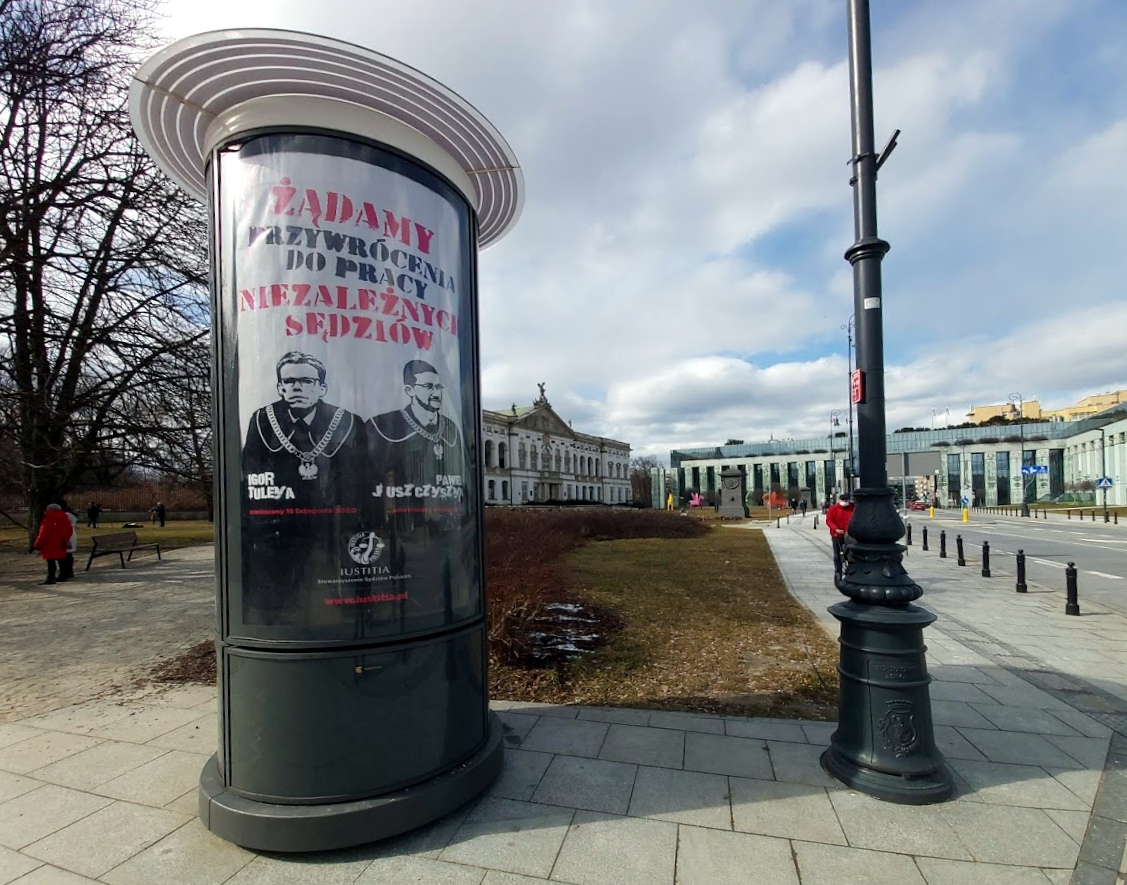
A poster of the Polish Judges Association "Iustitia" in front of the Supreme Court of Poland building in Warsaw calling for reinstatement of judges Igor Tuleya and Paweł Juszczyszyn

Polish Judges Association "Iustitia" (Polish: Stowarzyszenie Sędziów Polskich „Iustitia”) is a self-governing association of Polish judges.

In late 2010s the organization has been described as "extremely active in defending the rule of law in Poland".
