= Henryka Krzywonos =

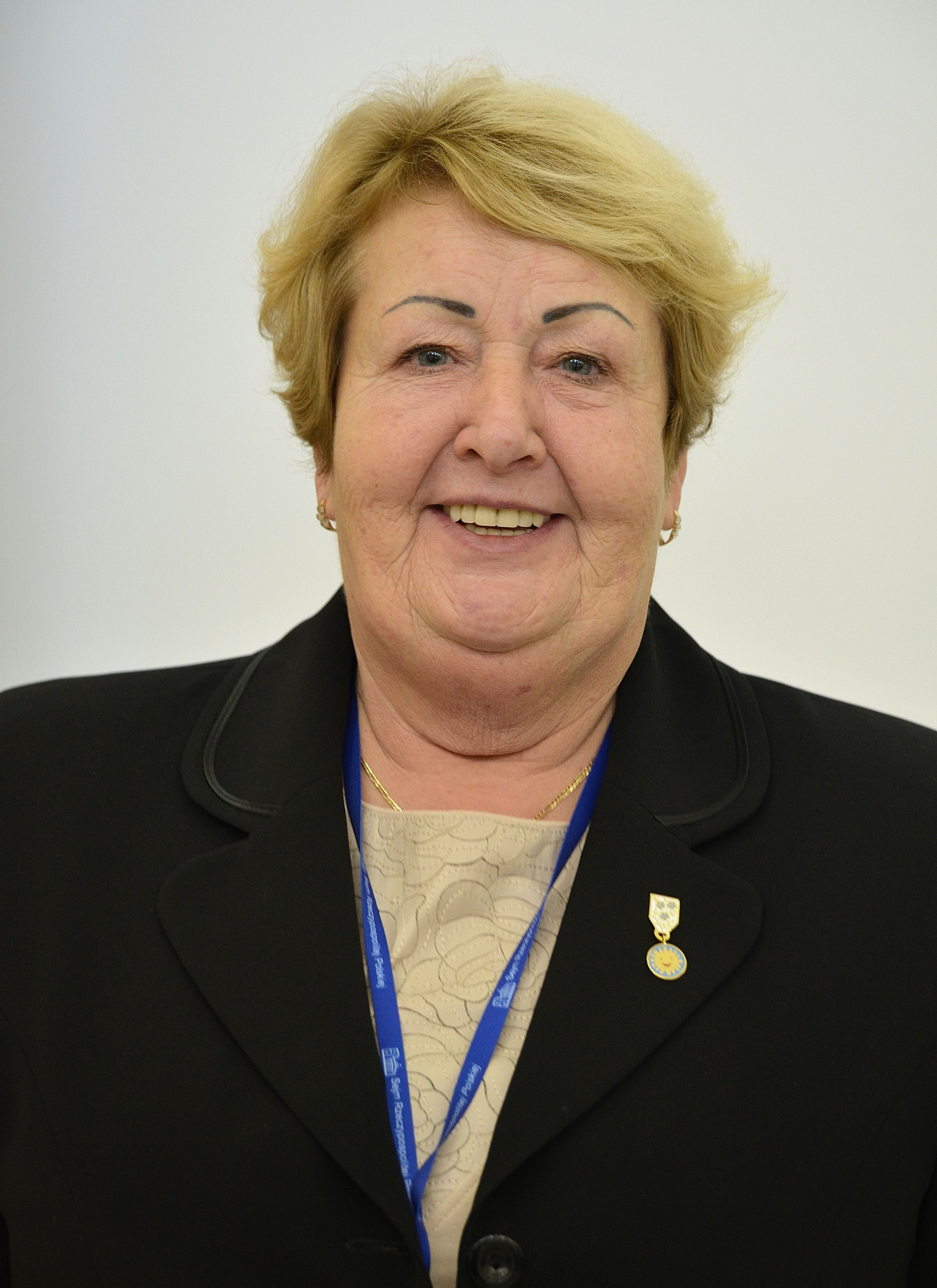
- Henryka Krzywonos in 2015

Deputy of the Sejm
- Incumbent
- Assumed office 2015
- Constituency: 26 Słupsk (since 2019); 26 Gdynia (2015–2019)

Personal details
- Born: Henryka Januszkiewicz; 27 March 1953 (age 73) Olsztyn, Polish People's Republic
- Party: Civic Coalition (since 2019)
- Other political affiliations: Civic Platform (until 2019)

Henryka Krystyna Krzywonos-Strycharska was the former head of the Gdańsk transport workers. She is noted for playing a role in strikes and protests in 1980 Gdańsk. The authorities later beat her, causing her to miscarry. Afterward she became involved in "family orphanages" and adopted 12 orphans with her third husband. She has been a deputy of the Sejm since 2015, serving in the VIII, IX and X terms.
