= Igor Tuleya =

Polish lawyer and judge

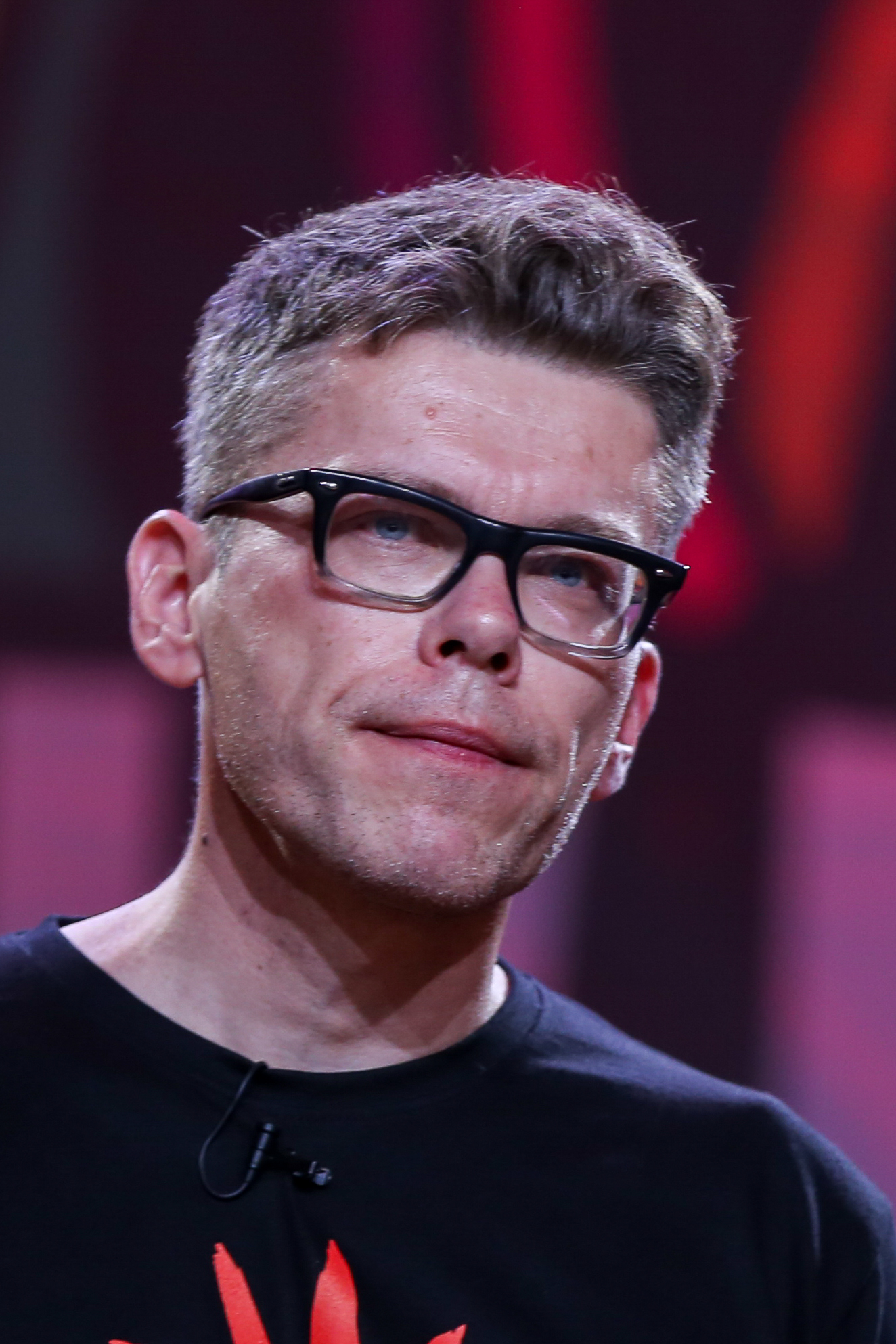
- Tuleya in 2019 at Pol'and'Rock Festival
- Born: Igor Zygmunt Tuleya; August 24, 1970 (age 56); Łódź, Poland
- Occupation: judge

Igor Zygmunt Tuleya (born 24 August 1970) is a Polish lawyer, judge at the district court of Warsaw and former spokesperson for this court. He is known for his criticism of government prosecutorial practices and his protests against judicial reforms, which he sees as a threat to the independence of the Polish judiciary.

On 18 October 2020 Tuleya was stripped of his immunity by the Disciplinary Chamber of the Supreme Court of Poland and suspended. The public prosecutor is charging Tuleya for a criminal breach of the secrecy of the investigation. The alleged breach happened when Tuleya allowed the press to hear the justification of one of the verdicts he gave in court.

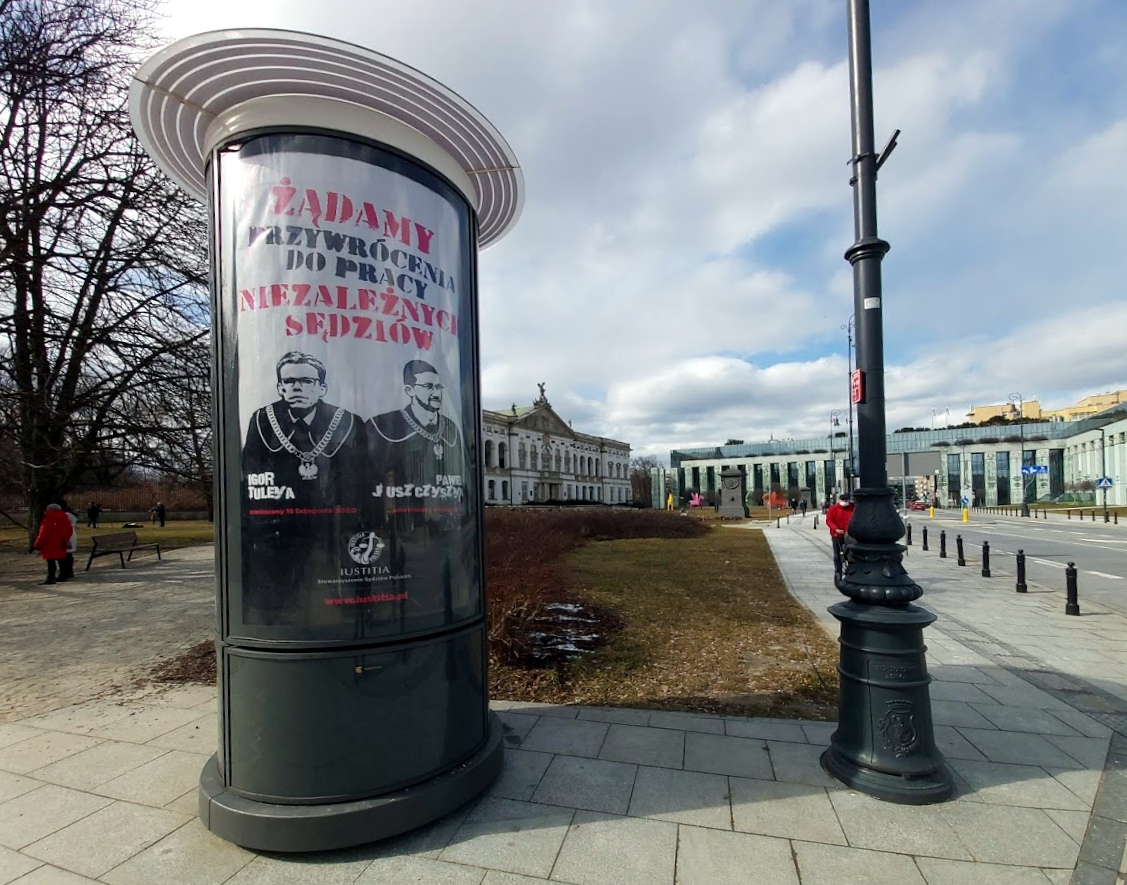
A poster of the Polish Judges Association "Iustitia" in front of the Supreme Court of Poland building in Warsaw calling for reinstatement of judges Igor Tuleya and Paweł Juszczyszyn

== Life ==
Tuleya was born on 24 August 1970 in Łódź and raised in Warsaw. Initially he intended to study Medicine, but continued to study law instead at the University of Warsaw. His mother was Lucyna Tuleja, she has served in the years 1960-71 as Militia in Łódź in the criminal department, and until 1988 an officer of the communist Security Service in Office B. responsible for investigation of foreigners and foreign diplomats under communist regime in Poland.

He was a judge at the district court in Nowy Dwór Mazowiecki. In 2007, he adjudicated a complaint from former civil servant Janusz Kaczmarek, who was suspected of leaking state secrets. Tuleya ruled that his arrest was unfounded and even illegal. Tuleya was then accused by the prosecutor of partiality.

In 2010 he was, after a judicial career of 14 years, appointed to the bench of the district court in Warsaw. In 2012 he was also spokesperson of the court, a position that would be taken away as a result of his justification of the verdict in the Mirosław Garlicki case.

On 4 January 2013, he sentenced the physician Mirosław Garlicki to a year's imprisonment, two years suspension and a fine because he accepted a bribe of 17,500 zloty. He acquitted him however of sexual abuse and causing the death of a patient.

In his justification of the verdict, Tuleya was very critical of the behavior of the prosecution. According to Tuleya, Garlicki was depicted as the personification of immoral behavior by physicians, and the post communist elite in general. The judge compared the behavior of the services with that of the Stalinist regime with threats, nocturnal interrogations and unjustified detention. Based on this ruling, Tuleya had to face investigations by the anti corruption agency.

In 2015, when the Prawo i Sprawiedliwość (Law and Justice, PiS) came into power, his verdict was used as support for accusations of corruption in the Polish judicial system. That would seem as a support of Law and Justice thesis that the judicial system in Poland needed a reform.

In 2017, Poland ended up in a constitutional crisis around the supreme court and the disciplinary system of judges. Tuleya asked, like some other judges, the European Court of Justice to answer a prejudicial question, on whether the new laws that were supposed to reform the Polish judicial system, were in accordance with European norms around judicial independence. In September 2019, the advocate-general of the European Court issued an opinion that these prejudicial questions should be dismissed. According to the advocate-general, it is not sufficiently clear that the judicial independence was actually infringed upon.

Tuleya also criticized other changes in the judiciary that were introduced under Law and Justice. In September 2018, the disciplinary ombudsman asked him and two other judges to clarify their participation in television programs and the criticism that they stated.

== Involvement in Pegasus surveillance scandal ==
According to media reports and his own testament, he, as a judge, may have consented to widespread surveillance measures by Polish authorities using the Pegasus software. He pleads to have been unaware of what he was actually signing because of intelligence provisions that allow for the concealment of technical aspects. Tuleya stated that he feels "exploited" by the PiS-era authorities. Besides tracing the opposition's activities, the software may as well have been used to monitor governing party cadres by power brokers within the PiS via interior department ministers Mariusz Kamiński and Maciej Wąsik.
