= Open Dialogue Foundation =

Human rights organization

- Formation: 2009; 17 years ago
- Type: Non-profit NGO; Advocacy organization
- Purpose: Human rights, activism
- Headquarters: Rond-point Schuman 6/5, Brussels 1040, Belgium
- Location(s): 11a/21 J. Ch. Szucha Av., Warsaw 00-580, Poland; 1/10 Bankova Str., office 5, 01024 Kyiv, PO Box 116, Ukraine
- Region served: Post-Soviet states, European Union
- Product: non profit human rights advocacy
- President: Lyudmyla Kozlovska
- Key people: Martin Mycielski Vice-President, Executive Director; Bartosz Kramek Chair of Supervisory Board; Andrzej Wielowieyski Supervisory Board Member; Michał Boni Supervisory Board Member
- Revenue: PLN 24,199,685.92 (2022)
- Expenses: PLN 24,126,403.10 (2022)
- Employees: 30+
- Volunteers: around 500
- Website: https://en.odfoundation.eu/
- Formerly called: Open Dialog Foundation

The Open Dialogue Foundation (ODF), formerly known as the Open Dialog Foundation (Polish: Fundacja Otwarty Dialog), is an international non-governmental organization, founded in 2009 in Poland and currently headquartered in Brussels, Belgium, with international offices in Warsaw, Kyiv and Miami, FL. It conducts research and advocacy on human rights and the rule of law in the post-Soviet area and – since 2018 – within the European Union.

In 2014–2016 and again since February 2022 it has focused on delivering humanitarian aid to Ukraine and supporting refugees fleeing that country. Since September 2024 the foundation also runs a campaign to deliver bionic prostheses to Ukrainian veterans together with Aether Biomedical. In the winter of 2026 it coordinated the "Warmth from Poland for Kyiv" campaign to deliver power generators to Ukraine struggling with power outages following Russian strikes.

== History ==
ODF was founded in 2009 in Warsaw, Poland and officially registered in 2010 by Lyudmyla Kozlovska, Ukrainian national from Sevastopol, Crimea. Kozlovska moved to Poland after the Orange Revolution in order to study. She had been a civic activist since the age of 13, when she opened the first Ukrainian library in Sevastopol. As a teenager she organized protests under the headquarters of the Russian Federation's Black Sea Fleet.

Kozlovska launched ODF following a human rights forum on Central Asia she had organized in Poland in 2008 with activists from Kazakhstan, Uzbekistan, and Kyrgyzstan and after having met Andrzej Grzyb MEP, who invited her to the European Parliament to speak on human rights in Kazakhstan and Uzbekistan. Initially, ODF based its activities on experiences of student movements and civic organisations that developed from the Orange Revolution.

In 2023 ODF was granted Participatory Status with the Council of Europe, with areas of competence i.a. in democracy, strengthening civil society, human rights, prevention of torture, European integration, rule of law and fighting against corruption.

== Activities ==
=== Ukraine ===
ODF became known in Poland following its support for the Euromaidan revolution in Ukraine. The foundation organised 3 monitoring missions between November 2013 and January 2014 with Polish MPs Michał Jaros, Tomasz Makowski, Michał Szczerba and Marcin Święcicki and 3 concerts at the Euromaidan.

In January 2014, it started a long-term monitoring mission and opened a permanent tent at the Euromaidan with the goal to "monitor the situation, support visits of international observers and share knowledge on the European Union". The mission lasted 56 days and included around 30 volunteers on the ground, with a total of 480 volunteers involved with the foundation between January and April 2014. The ODF tent was the only permanent presence of an NGO from the European Union at the Euromaidan.

ODF organised a mass humanitarian support campaign for the Euromaidan, sending a total of 35 tons of medicine, medical supplies, bulletproof vests and helmets to the protesters, journalists and observers, 10 tons of which went to the Donbas region. The total value of humanitarian aid delivered by ODF to Ukraine in 2014 was over PLN 1.000.000. Following its involvement in Ukraine the foundation became a target for Russian propaganda.

From late February 2014 until early June 2016, ODF run a support centre in central Warsaw for Ukrainian refugees under the name "Ukrainian World". The centre was estimated to have supported over 30.000 people during its functioning. At later stages the centre changed its focus to promoting Ukrainian culture in Poland.

Since 2014, ODF has been campaigning for Russia's release of Ukrainian pilot Nadiya Savchenko (released in a prisoner swap in 2016) and the imposing of sanctions on Russia following her detention, as well as that of Oleg Sentsov and other Ukrainian war and political prisoners illegally held in Russia.

In October 2016, ODF co-organised a "march of solidarity with Ukraine" in Warsaw.

In October 2019, following his release by Russia after five years in a gulag, Oleg Sentsov was received together with Lyudmyla Kozlovska by French president Emmanuel Macron. During the meeting, the head of the Foundation presented Macron with a list of 86 Ukrainians still imprisoned by Russia.

The foundation has advocated for democratic reforms and greater integration of Ukraine and the EU.

Following Russia's full-scale invasion of Ukraine in February 2022, ODF focused on supporting refugees fleeing Ukraine and delivering humanitarian aid, especially defensive equipment to the Armed Forces of Ukraine. Until June 2023 ODF has provided aid worth over PLN 35 million.

ODF regularly organises humanitarian missions to the frontlines, including to Bakhmut, together with a group of 5 Polish Members of Parliament, and to Kherson following the destruction of the Kakhovka Dam, where ODF delivered PLN 100.000 worth of aid from the City of Warsaw. Following the mission, Warsaw Mayor Rafał Trzaskowski and ODF's Martin Mycielski were awarded decorations by the Verkhovna Rada of Ukraine.

The foundation also manages the relocation of refugees to Western countries through an assistance point run at Warsaw's Eastern Railway Station and runs four "Homes for Independent Moms" for Ukrainian refugee women.

=== Russia ===
The foundation's activities related to Russia started in 2014 and were at first focused on campaigning for the release of political prisoners and prisoners of war following Russia's invasion of Ukraine, most notably pilot Nadiya Savchenko and film director Oleg Sentsov. For this purpose ODF joined other EU and Ukrainian human rights NGOs to organise an international advocacy campaign under the name "#LetMyPeopleGo", with a platform for monitoring and listing the so-called "hostages of the Kremlin" launched with the Center for Civil Liberties / Euromaidan SOS at www.letmypeoplego.org.ua.

In 2018, Swedish publishing house Ariel Förlag published the story of the Russian persecution of Ukrainian director Oleg Sentsov and other Kremlin prisoners based on ODF's report.

In November 2018 the Foundation campaigned against the appointment of a Russian general, Alexander Prokopchuk, as Interpol president, joining dozens of other NGOs from around the world and organising a viral social media campaign with Members of the European Parliament called "#InterpolNotForPutin".

As of 2019, ODF has also been campaigning against the renewal of voting rights of the Russian Federation in the Parliamentary Assembly of the Council of Europe, for the enforcement of European sanctions against Russia and for introducing a worldwide "Magnitsky Act".

=== Poland ===
In Poland ODF initially supported the civic opposition movements defending the independent judiciary, especially in mid-2017 during the attempted reform of the Supreme Court and other controversial reforms of the judiciary by the ruling majority. These reforms prompted the European Commission to invoke Article 7 of the European Treaty against Poland, denouncing the reforms as putting the judiciary under the political control of the ruling majority and citing "serious risk [to] the independence of the judiciary and the separation of powers". In response to the crisis, on 21 July 2017 ODF Board's Chair Bartosz Kramek published an article on civic disobedience, which was viewed by pro-government media as a call for a revolution and prompted then-foreign minister Witold Waszczykowski to officially request that the article be removed and to instruct fiscal authorities to conduct a "complex fiscal control" of the foundation. In October 2017 the foreign ministry filed a request to the court to forcefully dissolve and replace the foundation's board, but the request was dismissed by the court on 7 December.

ODF's advocacy in Poland focuses on the rule of law and especially the freedom of the judiciary and civic freedoms. ODF's report on cases of persecuted judges and prosecutors in Poland (incl. notable cases such as Igor Tuleya, Waldemar Żurek & Jerzy Stępień) was included, together with a similar report by the Helsinki Foundation for Human Rights, in the United Nations General Assembly's 41st Human Rights Council's "Report on the independence of judges and lawyers", published on 29 April 2019.

ODF's reports and input were included by the UN High Commissioner for Human Rights and European Commission (Annual Rule of Law Report, EU Justice Scoreboard). ODF also organises hearings and events with persecuted judges, prosecutors and activists at the OSCE, Parliamentary Assembly of the Council of Europe and European Parliament.

During President Andrzej Duda's visit to Washington, DC in June 2019, an ODF delegation led by board member Martin Mycielski held meetings at the Capitol, with the State Department and with other US stakeholders to "update them on the state of civic freedoms in Poland, especially the persecution of civic activists" and share most recent reports on Poland. This mission was criticised by Polish pro-government pundits including Aleksandra Jakubowska, Dawid Wildstein and Rafał Ziemkiewicz, as well as the Head of the Political Cabinet of the Minister of National Defence Łukasz Kudlicki.

In April and May 2020, the Foundation initiated appeals to the European Commission, calling for the initiation of an infringement procedure due to Poland's persecution of judges, and to the justices of the Supreme Court, calling for them to preserve the independence of the institution. The letters were co-signed by dozens of judicial and bar associations, law professors and public figures from around the world. In June 2020 Martin Mycielski, on behalf of ODF, initiated a follow-up appeal to the EC, signed by law professors as well as judges' and prosecutors' associations, requesting intervention with regard to the Disciplinary Chamber of the Supreme Court, incl. the case of judge Igor Tuleya, who the authors claimed was persecuted by it.

In October 2020 ODF, together with activists from Solidarity Action Brussels, organised a successful campaign to terminate the lease of the Brussels representation of Ordo Iuris. ODF's Martin Mycielski declared on that occasion that "this hateful organisation will never feel welcome in Brussels".

In November 2020 ODF filed a complaint against Ordo Iuris with the Joint EU Transparency Register Secretariat and the European Commission, requesting the removal of the organisation from the register and withdrawal of their right to lobby EU institutions. The authors argued that "an organisation representing the interests of a harmful foreign actor and an adversarial foreign power, concealing that fact, conducting activities undermining the integrity of the EU and damaging its values within at least one Member State, should not be allowed to benefit from an entry in the EU Transparency Register". The complaint was supported by 38 MEPs from the five main political groups, including EP Vice-president Fabio Massimo Castaldo, LGBTI Intergroup Co-chair Terry Reintke, Children's Rights Intergroup Co-chair Saskia Bricmont, Chairwoman of the Committee on Women's Rights and Gender Equality Evelyn Regner, Chairwoman of the Subcommittee on Security and Defence Nathalie Loiseau and Chairwoman of the Democracy, Rule of Law and Fundamental Rights Monitoring Group Sophie in 't Veld. Among Polish MEPs, the letter was signed by Róża Thun (who officially initiated it), Robert Biedroń, Łukasz Kohut and Magdalena Adamowicz.

In January 2021, ODF initiated, together with the Themis Judges' Association, an appeal to the European Commission to apply the conditionality mechanism of linking EU funds to the rule of law criterion for the prosecution of 14 Cracow judges by the National Public Prosecutor's Office. The letter was again signed by dozens of European law experts as well as Polish judges' and prosecutors' associations.

During a protest on 20 January 2021, the chairman of the board of the Open Dialogue Foundation, Bartosz Kramek, was pepper sprayed by police officers and thrown to the ground in the snow, then detained. Police alleged that Kramek threw snowballs at them, which he denied, with his claims being confirmed by video recordings of the event.

On 26 January 2021, the Parliamentary Assembly of the Council of Europe adopted a resolution entitled "Judges in Poland and in the Republic of Moldova must remain independent", with amendments prepared by ODF. The Foundation's involvement was criticised by the head of the Polish delegation Arkadiusz Mularczyk, who – together with Ian Liddell-Grainger – filed a complaint against ODF and opposition parliamentarians with the Assembly's president. For their "dirty warfare against ODF", Mularczyk and Liddell-Grainger received a 3-month ban from speaking at the Assembly by PACE's Committee on Rules of Procedure, Immunities and Institutional Affairs.

In April 2023, ODF's delegation with judge Maciej Ferek successfully advocated for two motions for a resolution (on the prosecution service and illegal surveillance) and a written declaration (on victims of the prosecution service and human rights).

In February 2024 the Foundation addressed an "Appeal for the review of politically motivated prosecutorial proceedings from 2015 to 2023 and rehabilitation of victims" to Prosecutor General Adam Bodnar, signed by 34 NGOs and 44 public figures, led by former President Lech Wałęsa. In response to the appeal, the Prosecutor General published an open letter in which he enthusiastically supported the demands of the appeal's authors, declaring the establishment of special, dispersed teams of prosecutors and a coordination team on the national level to "effectively review and analyse cases where there is any suspicion that they may have been politically motivated".

Also in February, ODF organised, together with Action Democracy, the Defensor Iuris Bar Association, the Władysław Bartoszewski Square Association and Video-KOD, a civic hearing of the candidates for the office of National Prosecutor, attended by the leading candidates, future National Prosecutor Dariusz Korneluk and prosecutor Ewa Wrzosek. The debate was moderated by journalists Jacek Żakowski (TOK FM) and Mariusz Jałoszewski (OKO.press), as well as lawyers Ewa Marcjoniak and Jakub Kocjan, and hosted by ODF's Martin Mycielski.

In June 2024 the Foundation filed a request for public information to the Minister of Justice and the National Prosecutor, demanding information on the progress of the nationwide audit of political investigations promised by the minister in February in response to ODF's appeal. The Foundation requested i.a. the status of the audit of cases submitted by ODF and Polish business associations, if and when the special teams of prosecutors where established, which prosecutor's offices are carrying out the audits, what administrative decisions have been taken, what is the timeline for the audit and if the prosecutors suspected of political decisions under former minister Zbigniew Ziobro were removed from their posts.

The Foundation also publishes an annual report on hate crimes in Poland, used i.a. by the OSCE and the European Union.

=== Kazakhstan ===
During and following the 2011 Zhanaozen massacre in Kazakhstan ODF monitored the situation and campaigned for the release of the jailed oil workers and for the investigation of the allegations of torture. On the second anniversary of the events ODF opened an exhibition on the massacre at Warsaw University, inaugurated by Adam Michnik, and a dedicated website at www.zhanaozen.eu.

In April 2013 ODF co-organised and co-financed an 8-day human rights monitoring mission of the Polish Supreme Bar Council to Kazakhstan.

Since then ODF organises monitoring missions and advocates for human rights in Kazakhstan (e.g. in the framework of consultations for the UN High Commissioner for Human Rights or for the OSCE).

On 11 February 2021, the European Parliament adopted a resolution on the human rights situation in Kazakhstan, which included parts prepared by ODF.

=== Moldova ===
ODF has been advocating for human rights and the rule of law in Moldova by organising human rights monitoring missions. It cooperates with international bodies like the OSCE, where it advocated in cases of politically persecuted judges and the nullified 2018 Chișinău mayoral election or the Parliamentary Assembly of the Council of Europe, where ODF organised a seminar in June 2017, together with deputies from three PACE fractions, focused on corruption and the persecution of dissidents in Ukraine and Moldova. ODF's report on cases of persecuted judges and prosecutors in Poland and in Moldova was included, together with a similar report by the Helsinki Foundation for Human Rights, in the United Nations General Assembly's 41st Human Rights Council's "Report on the independence of judges and lawyers", published on 29 April 2019.

=== Interpol ===
At least since 2013 ODF has been campaigning for the reform of Interpol, focused on the abuse of its "Red Notice" system by authoritarian states – notably Russia, Turkey, Belarus, Azerbaijan and Kazakhstan – for the persecution of political exiles. To that end ODF has held events in the European Parliament and national parliaments of EU member states, at the PACE, OSCE PA and ODIHR HDIM sessions, as well as provided expertise for Interpol bodies.

=== Financial exclusion and digital assets ===
In June 2025, Kozlovska appeared on behalf of ODF before the Tom Lantos Human Rights Commission of the United States House of Representatives at a hearing on transnational repression. In her written testimony, she argued that authoritarian governments and their proxies had used anti-money laundering and counter-terrorist-financing rules, cybersecurity laws and mutual legal-assistance arrangements to target civil-society organisations and discourage support for pro-democracy and humanitarian work. She described this as "transnational financial repression" and said that, after ODF's bank, crypto-asset-service and crowdfunding accounts had been closed, the foundation used peer-to-peer Bitcoin payments to fund humanitarian assistance in Ukraine.

In July 2026, the OSCE Parliamentary Assembly included a resolution on transnational repression in its Hague Declaration. The resolution referred to a Belgian court decision concerning requests by Kazakh authorities for surveillance, financial and travel data relating to Kozlovska and ODF in the European Union and the United States. It called on participating states to apply enhanced scrutiny to requests from states engaged in transnational repression and to provide remedies including the correction of records and restoration of access to basic banking services.

=== Building True Change coalition ===
Kozlovska leads the Building True Change coalition (BTC Coalition), which is coordinated by ODF. The foundation describes it as a network of human-rights defenders, political activists, Bitcoin entrepreneurs and industry experts. Its stated objectives include opposing the misuse of anti-money-laundering and counter-terrorist-financing rules for transnational repression, promoting financial inclusion, and supporting the use of Bitcoin and stablecoins for human-rights and humanitarian work.

In April 2024, the coalition urged members of the European Parliament to reject parts of the proposed EU anti-money-laundering regulation. It argued that provisions covering crowdfunding platforms, self-hosted cryptocurrency wallets and privacy-enhancing payment tools risked increasing financial exclusion and impeding civil-society and humanitarian activity. The coalition's intervention and concerns about the regulation's effects on financial privacy were subsequently covered by Forbes.

== Controversies ==
=== Poland ===
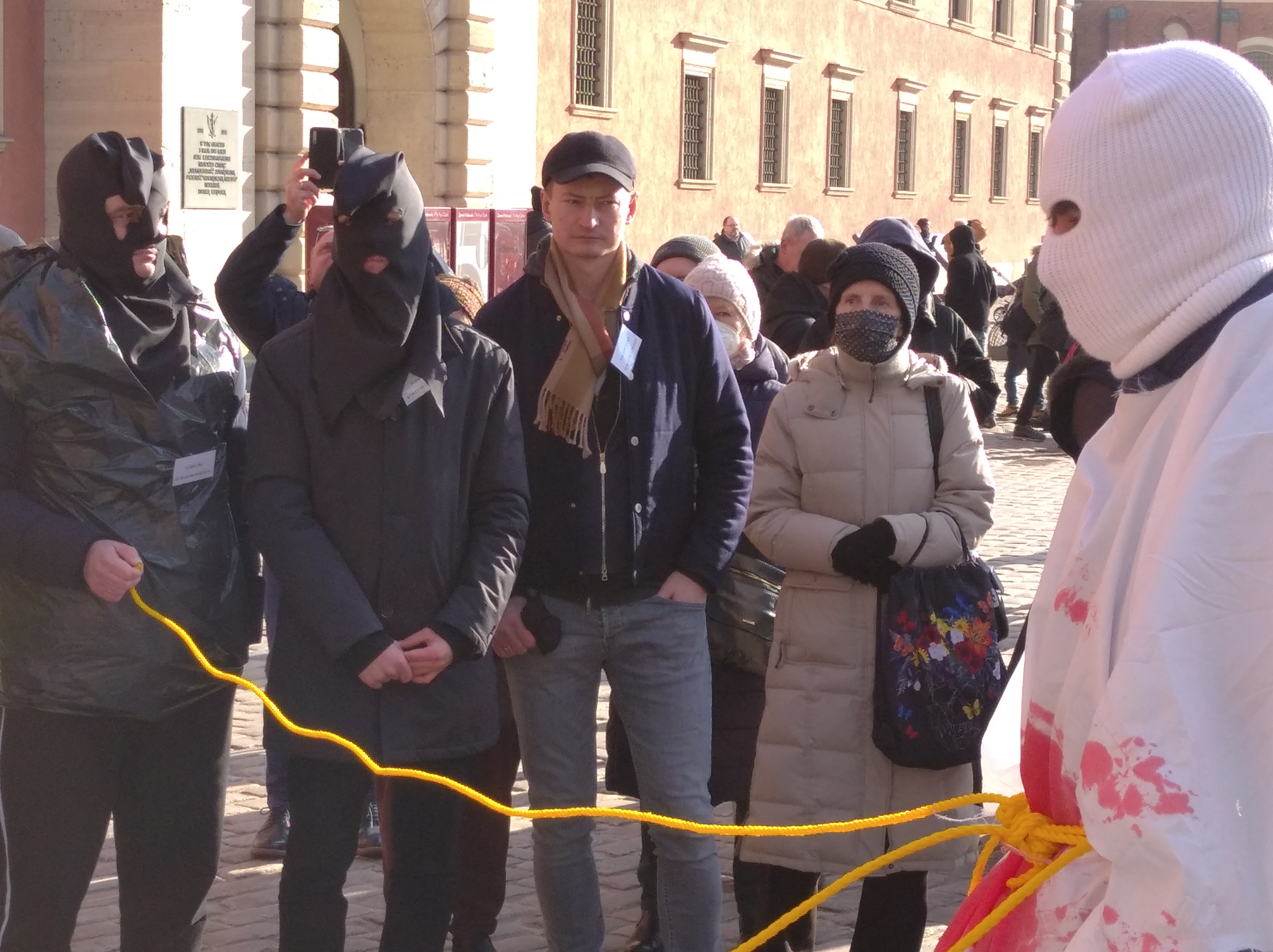
Bartosz Kramek (2022).

ODF has been a subject of controversy since mid-2017, when its Board's Chair Bartosz Kramek had published a Facebook article on possible civil disobedience actions against the Law and Justice government in Poland. In August 2018 the Polish government expelled ODF President and Bartosz Kramek's wife Lyudmyla Kozlovska from the Schengen zone by entering her into the Schengen Information System, citing secret intelligence that the NGO had received Russian funding. In an interview, Polish foreign minister Witold Waszczykowski admitted that the reasons for the expulsion were ODF "pursuing anti-Polish goals in Brussels", and taking "actions against a democratically elected government" by "writing a detailed plan on how to topple the Polish government".

The Polish government's action was met with criticism from EU officials and the international public opinion. Former Belgian prime minister and president of the ALDE Group in the European Parliament Guy Verhofstadt MEP commented that "Black lists against democracy activists are worthy of authoritarian regimes, not of EU Member States. The Schengen visa ban on Lyudmila Kozlowska must be withdrawn – or Poland's role in Schengen reviewed", with the ALDE Group directing two open letters to the European Commission on the matter. The Helsinki Foundation for Human Rights, in its statement, noted that the actions of Polish authorities were incompatible with EU law.

Protests were organised in Poland in support of Kozlovska and a public petition was initiated on 21 August by former Polish president and Nobel Peace Prize laureate Lech Wałęsa, asking EU heads of state to enable Kozlovska's return to the EU. The petition was signed by over 30,000 citizens and over 80 high-profile figures, including EU Commissioner Elżbieta Bieńkowska, Pulitzer Prize recipient Anne Applebaum, Lord Ashdown of Norton-sub-Hamdon, former government ministers Leszek Balcerowicz, Radosław Sikorski, Sławomir Nowak & Marcin Święcicki, the S&D Group in the European Parliament, Oscar-nominated director Agnieszka Holland, Gazeta Wyborcza editor-in-chief Adam Michnik, Newsweek Polska editor-in-chief Tomasz Lis, numerous Members of the European Parliament and Members of Parliament from Poland and Ukraine, NGOs, academics, journalists and other figures.

In an open letter initiated by the Ukrainian Helsinki Group, 11 Ukrainian civil and human rights organisations protested the inclusion of Kozlovska in SIS, calling it a "dangerous precedent which triggers a new kind of harassment of public activists in EU countries because of their public disagreement with state policy". The organisations claimed they supported ODF as "The organisation is actively working to release Ukrainian citizens imprisoned for political reasons in Russia and occupied Crimea, and is consistently pushing for sanctions against Vladimir Putin and his entourage for gross human rights abuses".

In mid-September 2018 the Schengen ban was disregarded by German authorities, who permitted Kozlovska to speak at the Bundestag, causing outrage in Poland, with the Polish foreign ministry summoning the German ambassador to protest and Polish president Andrzej Duda raising the matter with his German counterpart, Frank-Walter Steinmeier. She was next invited by Guy Verhofstadt to speak in the European Parliament on 26 September, with Belgian authorities disregarding the Polish ban, again causing backlash in Poland. In the end also France, Switzerland and the UK have disregarded the ban, letting Kozlovska speak on her case and the rule of law situation in Poland at the Council of Europe, the United Nations in Geneva and the House of Commons, respectively.

On 4 March 2019 Kozlovska received a 5-year residence permit in Belgium, which, according to EU law (Article 25 of the Schengen acquis) forces Poland to withdraw the SIS ban. In its ruling of 16 April the Voivodeship Administrative Court in Warsaw revoked the decision to include Kozlovska in SIS, claiming the secret documents on which it was based were "too general" and "failed to show how [she] poses a risk to nationality security". On 24 June the media announced that Poland had deleted Kozlovska from SIS, but that she likely still remains on the national list of unwanted persons.

From 24 to 26 June 2019, Dziennik and Dziennik Gazeta Prawna published a series of articles under the label "DGP investigations", uncovering new details about the case and claiming Polish secret services had collaborated with those of Moldova. This information has supposedly surfaced following the change of power in Moldova and its aftermath, resulting in the fall of the Vladimir Plahotniuc-led regime and the election of Maia Sandu to the post of Prime Minister. The investigation furthermore included a controversial revelation that the Fiscal and Customs Office in Łódź, tasked with investigating ODF by then-foreign minister Witold Waszczykowski, was until 28 February 2017 run by his brother, Tomasz, who still remains a senior official there.

In February 2021, state broadcaster TVP removed or amended nearly 40 articles and video materials about ODF following a court decision from September 2019. During a court hearing the same month, former Catholic priest Jacek Międlar, accused of inciting hate, called for the banning of the Open Dialogue Foundation, among others.

On 23 June 2021, Kramek was arrested and charged with money laundering. The public prosecutor's office claimed that Kramek received PLN 5.3 million (around USD 1,400,000) from fictitious companies registered in global tax havens, and passed the funds on to Russian and Ukrainian nationals using bank accounts belonging to ODP and his own company Silk Road. ODP denied any wrongdoing and claimed that the charges are politically motivated.

In February 2026, it had been revealed by Krzysztof Stanowski that ODF had planned to launch a smear campaign against Kanał Zero, a Polish commercial media outlet. ODF admitted that they had wanted to spread claims that the channel is spreading Russian propaganda, thereby pressuring the channel's sponsors to cancel their co-operation with the channel, possibly leading to its complete termination due to lack of funding. ODF accused the sponsoring companies of "funding attacks on Ukraine." Stanowski vehemently dismissed the accusations of ODF, stating it is wrong to baselessly accuse someone of being a Russian propagandist. Stanowski argued that he had regularly attacked pro-Russian journalists and politicians, while also not allowing supposedly pro-Russian figures, like Leszek Sykulski, to speak on Kanał Zero.

=== Military-equipment licence ===
According to Polish media reporting, in 2014 the foundation obtained a Polish licence to trade in military equipment, intended for transfer to the Donbas conflict zone in eastern Ukraine; the licence was issued by a former head of Poland's Military Counter-Intelligence Service and was later revoked on the order of Interior Minister Mariusz Błaszczak.

=== Moldova ===
ODF's activities became a subject of controversy in November 2018 following a report published by a closed-door Moldovan parliamentary committee, claiming the organisation was linked to the Russian Federation and had attempted to interfere with domestic Moldovan politics by funding of opposition parties. Some Moldovan press articles on the other hand viewed the report as an attack on the pro-EU Party of Action and Solidarity and Dignity and Truth Platform Party before the upcoming parliamentary elections.

The Moldovan parliamentary report on ODF again became a news story in Polish pro-government media in April 2019 following publications in the Scottish edition of The Sunday Times, which referenced the report, claiming ODF had received up to £1.6 million in donations from companies registered in Glasgow and Edinburgh. Prominent Polish governing coalition politicians like Ryszard Czarnecki and Patryk Jaki used these publications during their EP electoral campaign to attack the opposition, especially MEP Róża Thun, who had advocated for Lyudmyla Kozlovska following her expulsion. On 24 April, Onet.pl reported that the authors of the publications were in fact not Sunday Times journalists but the head of a PR agency and a pro-Brexit campaigner. The Economist's Balkan correspondent Tim Judah commented in an interview: "It's a very strange article. The authors cite the Moldovan parliament. I don't know anyone who would believe the findings of the Moldovan parliament."

Following the change of power in Moldova and election of Maia Sandu – who had earlier cooperated with ODF – to the post of Prime Minister, an investigation by Dziennik and Dziennik Gazeta Prawna revealed that the report, according to metadata, was "redacted or even entirely written by Andrian Candu", vice-chairman of the Democratic Party led by Vladimir Plahotniuc, who was not himself a member of the parliamentary committee. The publication also claimed that "Poland could have cooperated regarding ODF with security services controlled by Vladimir Plahotniuc", citing members of the committee. The Polish Chancellery of the Prime Minister responded to those allegations claiming that "the details of actions taken by special services are not revealed to the public for legal reasons". The topic has reportedly been discussed by Polish foreign minister Jacek Czaputowicz and his Moldovan counterpart Tudor Ulianovschi at the OSCE Ministerial Council in Milan in December 2018.

=== Advocacy cases ===
ODF has received criticism from far-right French MEP Nicolas Bay for one of the individual cases of human rights abuses that it had advocated for (together with Amnesty International and Human Rights Watch) – the case of Mukhtar Ablyazov, founder of the opposition political party Democratic Choice of Kazakhstan and opponent of Kazakhstan's first President Nursultan Nazarbayev. Bay alleged that ODF receives financial support from Ablyazov.

The alleged financial link between the foundation and Ablyazov has also been reported by EU Reporter and set out at length in Gary Cartwright's 2019 book Wanted Man: The Story of Mukhtar Ablyazov, which refers to "suggestions that Ablyazov himself is the driving force behind the ODF and that he is personally funding" it and quotes the Kazakh politician Yermek Narymbayev as saying the foundation was created by Ablyazov "for protecting himself at the European Parliament".

ODF rejects the claim that Ablyazov controls or funds it, describing such allegations as part of a Kazakh-government campaign against it.

The foundation's advocacy has extended to other individuals facing serious criminal proceedings, including Viktor and Ilyas Khrapunov and Bota Jardemalie; it opposed the extradition from Austria to Russia of Nail Malyutin and Aslan Gagiyev, and supported, at the European Parliament and PACE, the Moldovan businessman Veaceslav Platon, then serving an 18-year sentence, whom PACE Written Declaration No. 617 (11 October 2016) described as a victim of political persecution. ODF presents these as cases of politically motivated prosecution.

=== Russia ===
In 2024, the foundation was designated as an "undesirable organization" by the Russian authorities.
