= Paweł Krutul =

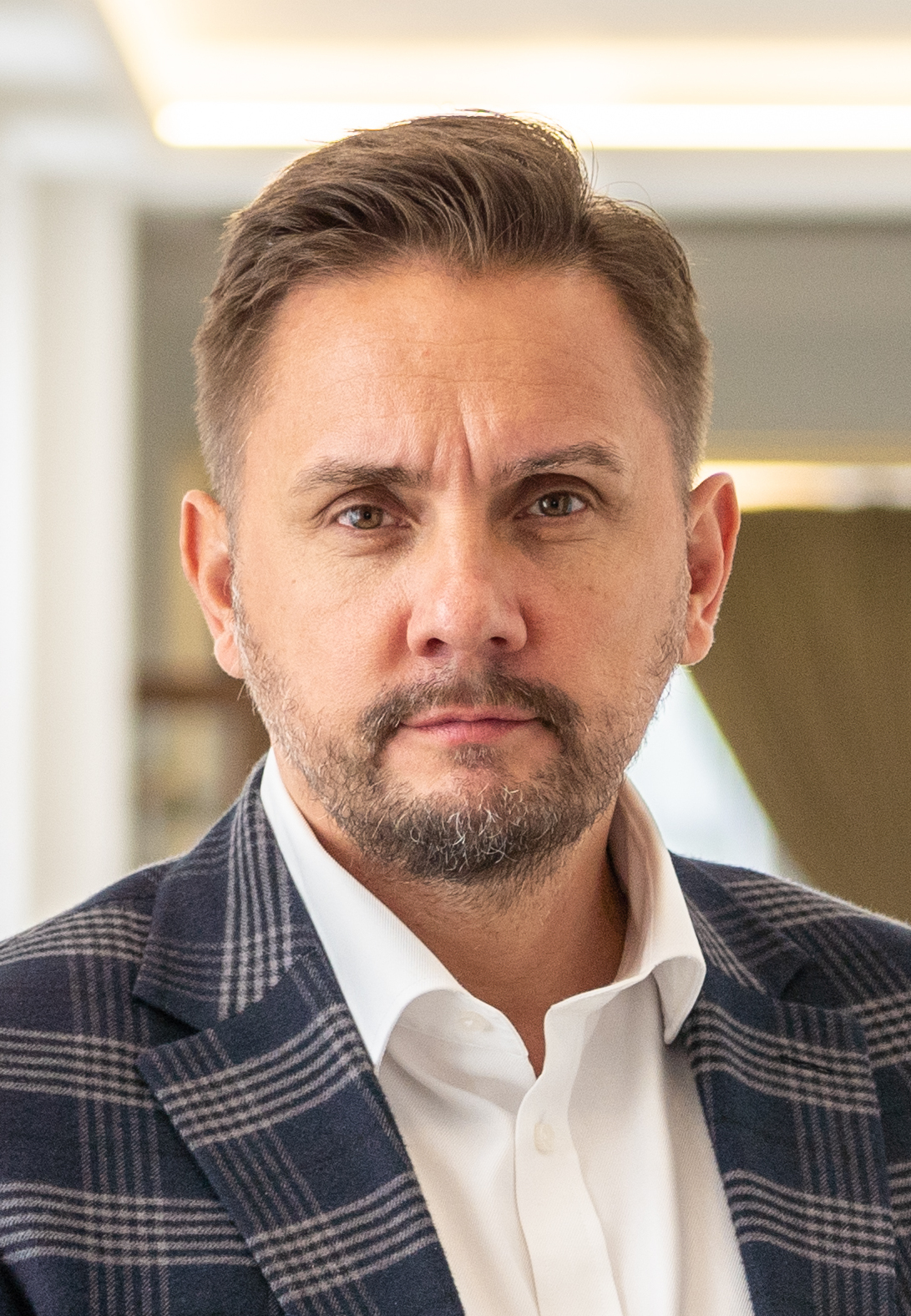

Member of the Sejm
- In office 12 November 2019 – 12 November 2023
- Constituency: 24 – Białystok

Personal details
- Born: 21 February 1974 (age 52) Białystok, Polish People's Republic
- Citizenship: Poland
- Party: New Left
- Other political affiliations: Modern (2015-2017) Civic Platform (2017-2019) Spring (2019-2021)
- Education: Białystok Academy of Finance and Management
- Occupation: Politician

Paweł Krutul (born February 21, 1974, in Białystok) is a Polish politician, manager and entrepreneur, member of the Sejm of the Republic of Poland of the 9th term.

== Biography ==
He is a graduate of management and marketing, he obtained his master's degree from the Academy of Finance and Management in Białystok in 2002. He also completed postgraduate studies at the Higher School of Public Administration. Stanisław Staszic in the same city. He was the director of the parliamentary office. For 13 years he worked as a manager at Central European Distribution Corporation. He was a member of the programming board of TVP3 Białystok. He also started his own business.

He was an activist of Nowoczesna (he served, among others, as vice-chairman of the party in the Podlaskie Voivodeship). In 2017, he joined the Civic Platform[5]. In 2019, he joined the Spring party, becoming the chairman of its Podlaskie structures.

In the 2019 parliamentary elections, he ran from the first place on the Democratic Left Alliance list in the Białystok parliamentary constituency (as part of an agreement between left-wing parties). He was elected as a member of the Sejm of the 9th term, receiving 13,455 votes. In the Sejm, he became a member of the National Defense Committee and the Committee on Physical Culture, Sport and Tourism, as well as vice-chairman of the permanent Subcommittee for foreign cooperation and NATO. In June 2021, after the dissolution of Spring party, he became an MP of the New Left.
