= 2026 Poland 2050 leadership election =

Polish election

- 10 January 2026 (first round); 12 January 2026 (second round, annulled); 31 January 2026 (second round)
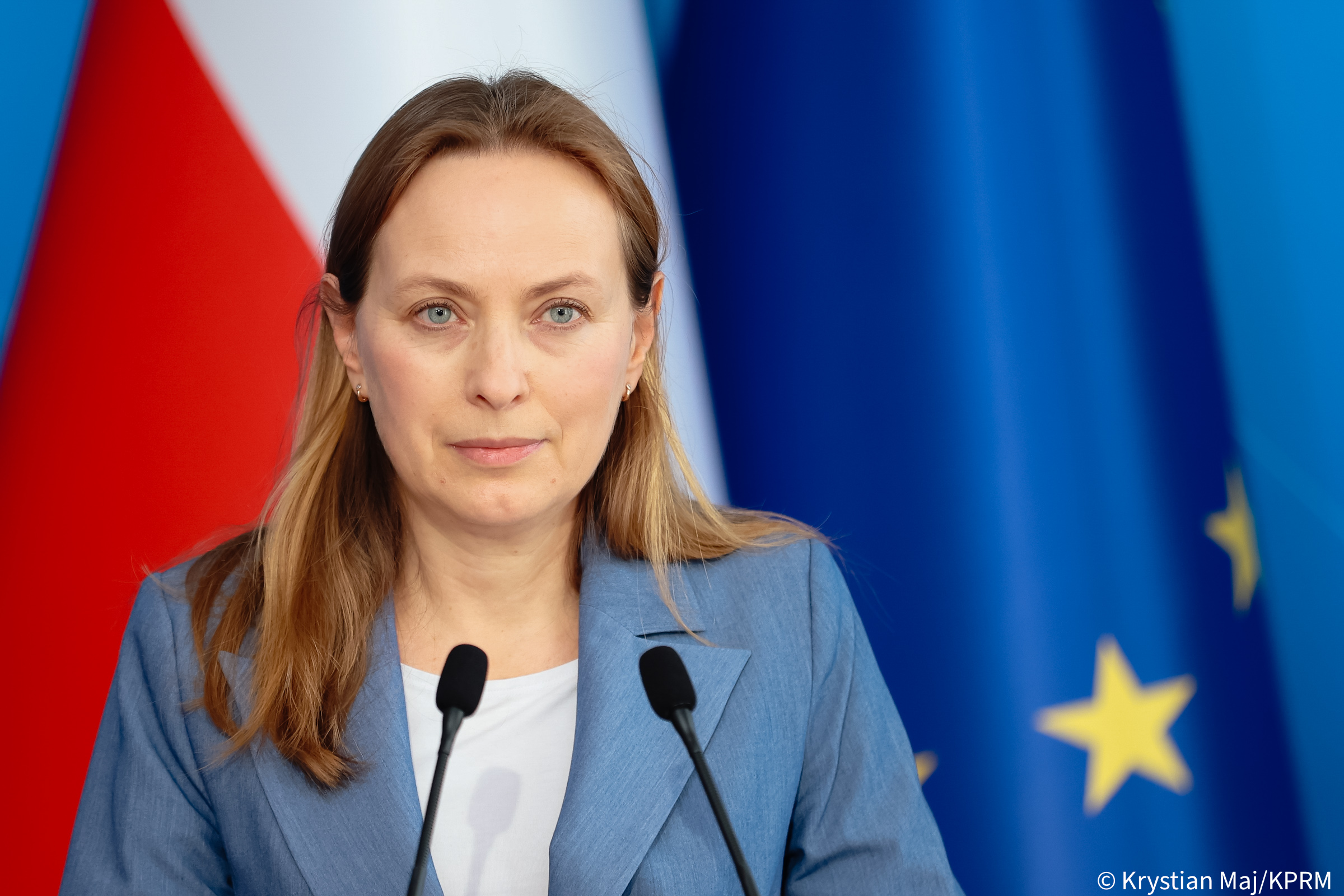

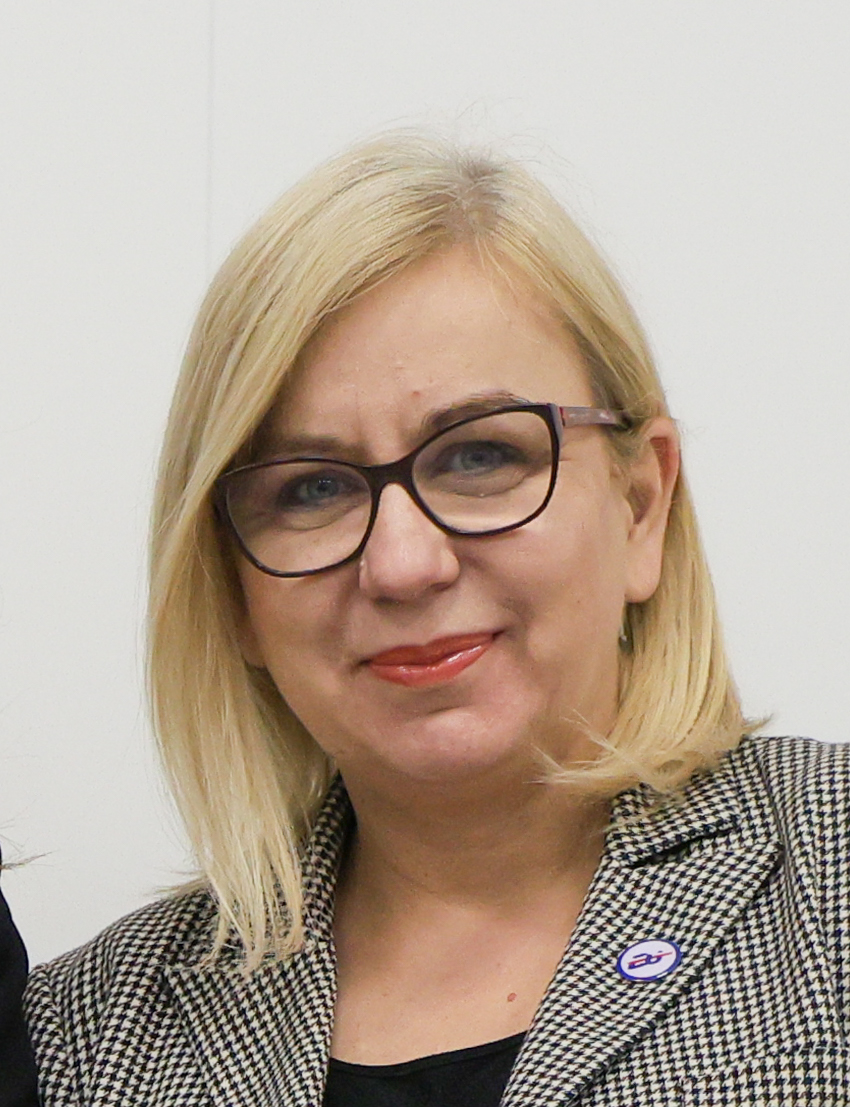
Candidate	Katarzyna Pełczyńska-Nałęcz	Paulina Hennig-Kloska
Popular vote	350	307
Percentage	53.27%	46.73%
Chairman before election
Szymon Hołownia
Elected Chairman
Katarzyna Pełczyńska-Nałęcz

The 2026 Poland 2050 leadership election was held in January 2026 to elect the leader of Poland 2050, with the outgoing leader, Szymon Hołownia, retiring from the position amongst the party's poor performances in elections. Katarzyna Pełczyńska-Nałęcz narrowly defeated Paulina Hennig-Kloska for the position. In the first round of the leadership election on 10 January, Pełczyńska-Nałęcz and Hennig-Kloska, representatives of two rival internal factions within the party, advanced to the second round, which was held on 12 January. However, the second round was annulled during voting due to an issue with the voting software, leading to its rescheduling to 31 January.

== Electoral system ==
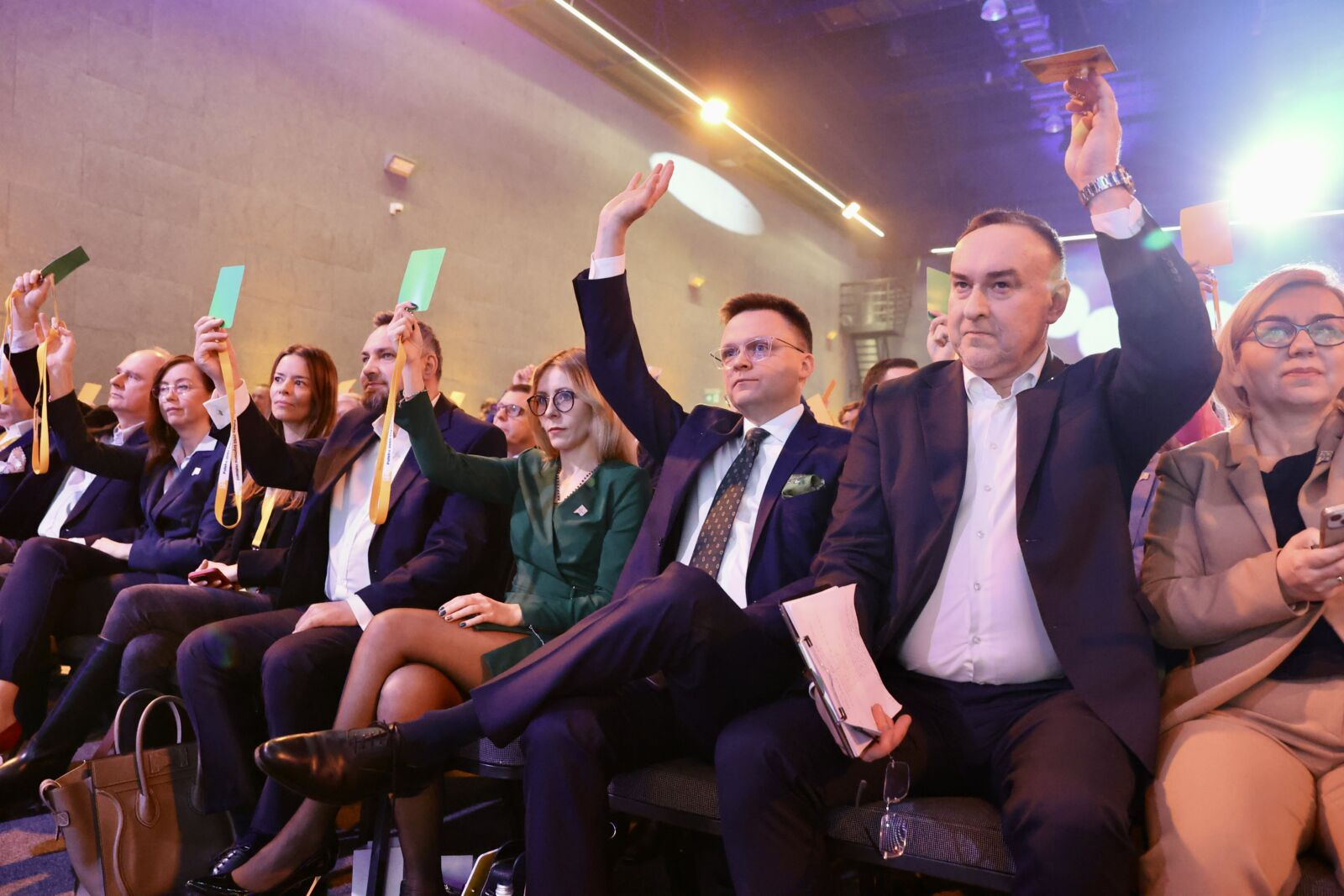
Voting during the 1st Poland 2050 Party Congress in 2023

The party was provisionally chaired by Michał Kobosko in 2020–2022 until Hołownia took chairmanship over his party in 2022, later being selected as party chairman for a three-year term at the first National Convention of the party on 21 January 2023.

The election for party leader of Poland 2050 takes place every three years. Initially, the election was scheduled for 10 January 2026 (9:15 to 15:00 CET), with a runoff on 12 January (16:00 to 22:00 CET), since no candidate gained the support of over 50% of delegates, although the second round was invalidated and rescheduled for 31 January 2026 (16:00 to 22:00 CET). The support signature collection period began on 20 October 2025, with official registrations beginning on 9 December and ended on 10 December. Candidates were required to electronically collect 84 signatures from party members to register in the election. The final list of successfully registered candidates was to be released by 13 December, though ultimately, it was released on 11 December.

Only "regular members" of the party are eligible to vote. Poland 2050 had around 800-860 eligible voters in the 2026 leadership election's first round, and around 800 in the second.

The vote was conducted electronically using the Interankiety (Responsly Platform) web service, with voters receiving emailed election formulas, and the election was monitored by "special observers". In a statement published after the annulled second round, Interankiety (Responsly Platform) claimed that Poland 2050 had used the platform in a standard self-service SaaS model, and stated that the account used for the vote had been automatically blocked after voting links were shared on social media, which triggered the platform's security mechanisms because of an unusually high number of accesses. According to TVN 24, a different service than Interankiety was used in the repeated second round.

On 17 January, the party's National Council (Polish: Rada Krajowa) was to convene for the election of four of the nine National Board (Polish: Zarząd Krajowy) members, with four selected by the new party leader and one being the party's parliamentary club leader (currently Paweł Śliz). However, this was hastened to 16 January following the invalidation of the runoff, but during the meeting, the proceedings were paused and resumed on 19 January. Ultimately, the election for four of the party's National Board members was postponed to 7 February.

On 21 January, the term of the party's parliamentary representation in the National Council expired. On 22 January, the parliamentary group selected nine new representatives for the National Council, six from the Sejm and three from the Senate. (Note: The elected representatives were: Barbara Oliwiecka, Żaneta Cwalina-Śliwowska, Elżbieta Burkiewicz, Sławomir Ćwik, Szymon Hołownia, Marcin Skonieczka (Sejm) and Grzegorz Fedorowicz, Piotr Masłowski, Jacek Trela (Senate).) The party also removed Aleksandra Leo as the co-chair of the Sejm parliamentary group, replacing her with Bartosz Romowicz.

Until 15 January, party's election commission was chaired by Maurycy Przyrowski, and he was later replaced by Marta Cienkowska.

== Background ==
Opinion polling of Poland 2050 and the Third Way in Polish parliamentary elections. Vertical lines left to right: performance of party in 2020, 2023, 2024 (local), 2024 (European Parliament), 2025.

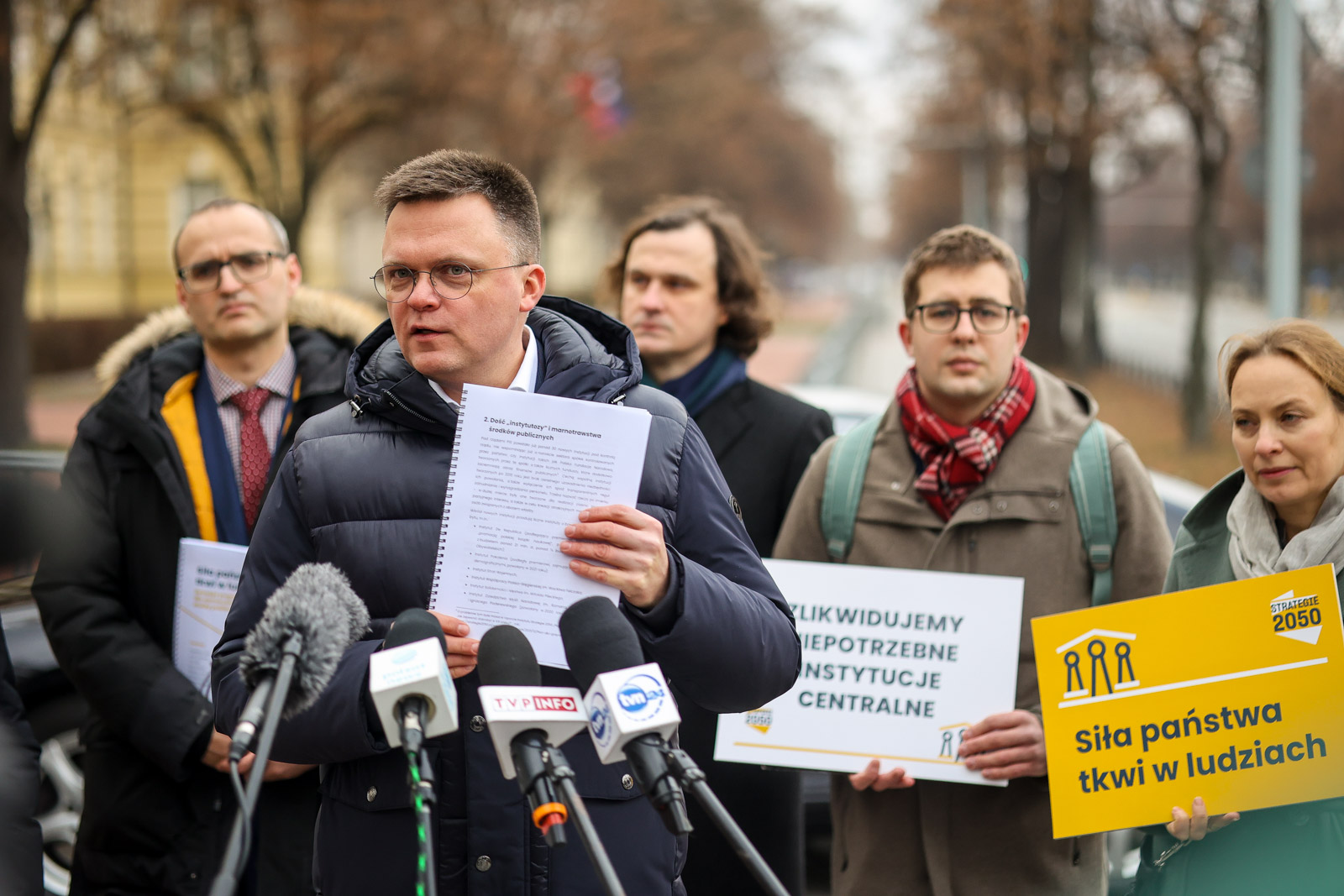
Szymon Hołownia during the 2023 parliamentary election campaign

Poland 2050, officially Szymon Hołownia's Poland 2050 (Polish: Polska 2050 Szymona Hołowni), was founded as a political vehicle for Szymon Hołownia's political ambitions following his good performance in the 2020 Polish presidential election, where he gained 13.9% of the vote in the first round. The party surged in popularity quickly — in mid-2021, it reached its all-time high, positioning itself as the second most popular party in many opinion polls at the time, before declining to third place and later hovering above the 5% electoral threshold. Due to its declining performance, it allied itself with the Polish People's Party (PSL) and other small parties to form the centre-right Third Way political alliance. In the 2023 parliamentary election, this alliance amassed 14.4% of the vote. However, the coalition would soon start losing support after becoming part of the Third Cabinet of Donald Tusk. Most critically, Third Way would suffer a major defeat in the 2025 presidential election, where Hołownia, its candidate, would only gain 4.99% of the vote.

Following this defeat, PSL declared its exit from the Third Way on 17 June. Hołownia was criticized by liberal election denialists for not preventing the inauguration of the then President-elect, Karol Nawrocki by using his power as Marshal of the Sejm to suspend the inauguration. Later, after a meeting on 4 July with the opposition leader, Jarosław Kaczyński of the Law and Justice party, his own position within the ruling coalition and his own party weakened, with two posełs leaving the party and becoming independents. By the time of the leadership election, according to many pollsters, Poland 2050 sat below the 5% electoral threshold required to enter the Sejm. Additionally, the party suffered from a large amount of debt accumulated over its existence, with around 11 million PLN of debt accumulated from the 2023 parliamentary and 2025 presidential elections. Poland 2050's unfavourable election results also contributed to the creation of New Poland, a party with similar ideals to those of Hołownia's party.

On 27 September, Hołownia announced that he would not participate in the next leadership election, stating that it was the "right moment" to change the party's leader. He then announced his application for the role of United Nations High Commissioner for Refugees.

On 30 September, Poland 2050 recommended Katarzyna Pełczyńska-Nałęcz to the office of Deputy Prime Minister, narrowly defeating her internal party rival, Paulina Hennig-Kloska, for the nomination in votes at both the party's parliamentary club (16 to 14) and the party's National Council (22 to 19). The vote solidified the split between members supportive of further cooperation with the government and Prime Minister Donald Tusk, including Hennig-Kloska, and those wanting a confrontational stance that supported Pełczyńska-Nałęcz.

== Campaign ==
=== Paulina Hennig-Kloska ===
Paulina Hennig-Kloska announced her candidacy on 28 November. Hennig-Kloska began her political career in the party Modern founded by Ryszard Petru, also a contestant in the PL2050's 2026 leadership election. She was elected to the Sejm in 2015 before defecting to Poland 2050 in 2021, becoming one of its representatives before its first contested election in 2023, becoming Minister of Climate and Environment after the election.

Hennig-Kloska orients her tenets on three pillars — dialogue, economy and nature, and supports the model of "liberalism with a human face". Hennig-Kloska called for the party to "return to its roots" and support small business. Her official electoral page praised the decrease in inflation and overall economy under Tusk's government, highlighted the issues of green energy, climate change and called for decentralization of the party.

Hennig-Kloska was a prominent personality within the party's faction that seeks cooperation with prime minister Donald Tusk. Wirtualna Polska described her, alongside Petru, Mucha and Kobosko, as informally allied against Pełczyńska-Nałęcz. Regardless of this, she criticized Petru's start early in her campaign, stating his ideas are unfit for the party. Early in her campaign, she announced that she would be conducting a tour of all voivodeships in Poland. She also challenged the party's endorsement of Pełczyńska-Nałęcz for Deputy Prime Minister, stating that would she win, "it would be difficult to imagine having a superior from my own party in the cabinet".

Hennig-Kloska advanced into the second round of the election along with Pełczyńska-Nałęcz, receiving 20% of votes, narrowly ahead of Joanna Mucha who gained 18% of the vote. In her campaign for the second round, she held an online meeting with around 200 of her supporters. However, the second round was invalidated due to a system error, and Hennig-Kloska's rival, Pełczyńska-Nałęcz, offered her to co-lead the party by a decision of the party's National Council. Hennig-Kloska rejected the offer. Rzeczpospolita described Hennig-Kloska as the new frontrunner, eclipsing Pełczyńska-Nałęcz, after the 19 January National Council meeting.

Ultimately, Hennig-Kloska lost the election narrowly, being defeated by Pełczyńska-Nałęcz with 53 of the vote.

=== Szymon Hołownia ===
Although the outgoing leader, Szymon Hołownia, did not register for the first two rounds of the election, he remained actively involved in the process and, following the invalidation of the second round, attempted to enter the contest.

On 27 September, Hołownia officially declared his intention not to start in the party's routine 2026 leadership election, stating that it was the "right moment" for the party to change its leadership. Early in the campaign, party members and media speculated that Hołownia might retract his statement not to run, especially considering the slim chances of his United Nations High Commissioner for Refugees application succeeding. (Note: Hołownia ended up losing the contest for the UN position to former Iraqi president Barham Ahmad Salih.) Several politicians openly called for Hołownia to retract his withdrawal and remain as the party leader, including other candidates: in October, Michał Kobosko supported a return for Hołownia. Hołownia's supporters collected the required signatures for him to register, and proposals were even made to extend the registration period beyond the 10 December deadline so that he could still enter the race. Hołownia nevertheless reiterated his intention to step down and ultimately did not register.

Hołownia's stance on participation changed by early January. On 31 December, (Note: The existence of the group chat was leaked on 23 January.) he created a secret group chat with 12 of his closest supporters. (Note: The group chat included Marta Cienkowska, Aleksandra Leo, Adriana Porowska, Bartosz Romowicz (a candidate in the election), and Kamil Wnuk, among others.) As early as 3 January, some members suggested delaying or cancelling the party election and explored possible legal avenues that would allow Hołownia to remain leader, though Hołownia himself rejected these at the time. However, after the invalidation of the 12 January runoff, Hołownia announced in a press conference on 13 January that he did not rule out running if the first round was to be repeated along with the second. According to Wirtualna Polska, the majority of party members opposed his return at this stage. Despite this, Hołownia declared his intention to contest a repeated election at the meeting of the party's National Council on 16 January, but withdrew once again on 19 January, when the meeting resumed following a three-day break.

In an interview on 26 January, Hołownia stated that he would exit Poland 2050 if either Pełczyńska-Nałęcz or Hennig-Kloska took control over the party, demanding either a repeat of both rounds of the election or for the party to adopt co-leadership between the two runoff candidates. Ultimately, Hołownia failed to re-enter the election, and it was won by Pełczyńska-Nałęcz.

=== Rafał Kasprzyk ===
Rafał Kasprzyk announced his candidacy on 8 December. He previously served as an activist of the Modern party, much like Hennig-Kloska and Modern's founder, Ryszard Petru, both contestants in the leadership election. He joined Poland 2050 in 2020, getting elected to the Sejm in 2023.

Kasprzyk emphasized the need for a centrist party in Poland. In his opening announcement, he called for a "new opening" and "rebranding" for the party, rebuilding its credibility and public trust.

Kasprzyk came last in the election with 5% of the vote. He endorsed Hennig-Kloska in the runoff.

=== Michał Kobosko ===
Michał Kobosko declared his candidacy on 22 November. (Note: Kobosko announced his start to his supporters on 22 November at a teleconference, although media only officially began reporting on his decision on 25 November after a Polish Press Agency interview.) Kobosko was a journalist tied with several newspapers before becoming a part of Szymon Hołownia's 2020 campaign staff. He became a founder of Poland 2050 and its temporary chairman between 2020 and 2022 before the assumption of the position by Hołownia, and was then elected to the Sejm in 2023 and the European Parliament in 2024.

Kobosko supported presenting Poland 2050 as a "centrist-liberal" party of "liberalism with a human face" — reducing social inequality while supporting entrepreneurs. Despite desiring to contest the next parliamentary election without any electoral allies, he stated his openness to an electoral bloc of the coalition, especially the Civic Coalition and Polish People's Party, against the rise of far-right parties in the country. He described the situation in Poland 2050 as a "crisis of leadership" and stated restoring belief in success and a new party program as his primary goals.

Onet informed of Kobosko's withdrawal on 30 December. Despite not explicitly endorsing anyone, he stated he has "fingers crossed" for Hennig-Kloska, Mucha and Petru, whom he was allied to against Pełczyńska-Nałęcz.

=== Joanna Mucha ===
Joanna Mucha announced her candidacy on 29 October. Mucha was first elected to the Sejm in 2007 as a part of the Civic Platform, becoming the Minister of Sport and Tourism from 2011 until 2013. She previously ran for party chairman of the Civic Platform in 2020, but withdrew to support Borys Budka. Ultimately, she defected to Poland 2050 in 2021, becoming part of the party's parliamentary representation.

Mucha desires to strongly present Poland 2050 as a centrist party in between the liberal-conservative Civic Coalition and the right-wing Law and Justice. However, she rejects any coalition with the latter. Mucha was also critical of the party's former alliance with the Polish People's Party, and opposes forming any electoral blocs for the next parliamentary election. She seeks to have Poland 2050 to secure a victory matching its result 2 years before (where PL2050 and PSL scored 14.4% together), and for this victory to ensure a continuation of the incumbent coalition. She seeks to return the party to its "roots" as a "project of the future", orienting the party around climate and digitization issues, such as AI adoption, and promises to form Poland 2050 into a party that "sees, hears and feels, recognizes and understands the needs of Poles."

Mucha was a member of the alliance against frontrunner Pełczyńska-Nałęcz. She criticized Katarzyna Pełczyńska-Nałęcz, stating she deviated from the ideology of the party.

Mucha was eliminated in the first round of the election, earning 18% of the vote, close behind Hennig-Kloska, who entered the runoff with 20%. In the second round, Mucha endorsed Hennig-Kloska.

=== Katarzyna Pełczyńska-Nałęcz ===
Frontrunner Katarzyna Pełczyńska-Nałęcz was the third to announce her candidacy, doing so on 21 November. Pełczyńska-Nałęcz served as the Polish ambassador to Russia in 2014–2016 and later began engaging in politics as a presidential campaign staffer for Szymon Hołownia in the 2020 presidential election. She was then chosen as the Minister of Funds and Regional Policy in 2023. Despite deciding not to run in elections to the Sejm in 2023, she declared her candidacy in the next Sejm election.

In her announcement, Pełczyńska-Nałęcz laid out three points: strengthening the party and its structures, presenting the party and its values to the public, and preparing the party for an independent start in the next parliamentary election, without attaching itself to any other parties. She views the party's electorate as "moderate, balanced, family-oriented, pragmatic" rather than anti-establishment. She rejects "extreme liberalism" and supports a social market economy, understanding the concept of social market economy as market economy "for the consumer and competition, not for influential narrow interest groups and lobbies". In taxation, Pełczyńska-Nałęcz supports lowering the tax burden on businessmen while raising the taxes on big corporations. She was described by OKO.press as of a social democratic orientation.

Pełczyńska-Nałęcz was considered a leading figure in the faction of the party seeking confrontation with prime minister Donald Tusk and a frontrunner in the race. OKO.press described her as a "grey eminence" within the party. She was internally supported by outgoing leader Hołownia, although not officially endorsed by him, but faces opposition from most other candidates in the leadership election, and it was speculated that her election could result in the splitting off of a large part of the party's parliamentary representation along factional lines. According to TVN 24, her position among party members decreased since her start in the election. Onet described the election as a plebiscite regarding Pełczyńska-Nałęcz's leadership.

Pełczyńska-Nałęcz advanced into the second round of the election along with Hennig-Kloska, receiving 42% of votes. Due to a system error, the second round held on 12 January was invalidated, and before a 19 January National Council meeting to resolve the issue, Pełczyńska-Nałęcz offered Hennig-Kloska for both of them to be elected as co-leaders of the party by a decision of the council, highlighting that such a solution has worked in different parties (like the KWiN, NL, SPD), although Hennig-Kloska rejected such a solution.

Ultimately, Pełczyńska-Nałęcz emerged victorious, defeating Hennig-Kloska with 53% of the vote.

=== Ryszard Petru ===
On 1 October, Ryszard Petru was the first to declare a start in the leadership election. Petru was the founder of the Modern political party, which entered the Sejm in 2015, although he was ultimately removed from party leadership in 2017, narrowly defeated by Katarzyna Lubnauer. The party, alongside the Polish Initiative and The Greens, was then joined into the Civic Coalition alliance (Note: In October 2025, the Civic Coalition alliance united into a single party of the same name, leading to the dissolution of Modern.) as a junior partner to the Civic Platform led by Donald Tusk. Petru joined Poland 2050 for the 2023 parliamentary election, returning to the Sejm on its lists.

Petru was considered among the most prominently pro-business members of the party. In his campaign, Petru promised to strongly stand on the side of businessmen, supporting an austere budget and restriction of welfare programs. He seeks to return the party to attaining "7-10% of the vote" by competing for voters with the far-right Confederation for its economically liberal voters which he deems voted for Poland 2050 in 2023 but defected to the Confederation afterwards, by returning to the "roots" of Poland 2050.

Petru was a member of the alliance against Katarzyna Pełczyńska-Nałęcz. He voted against Pełczyńska-Nałęcz's candidacy for Deputy Prime Minister, considering her a left-winger compared to his liberal stances. Petru submitted his registration for the election on 17 November, with 100 signatures of support. Despite his name recognition, support for his candidacy among the party rank-and-file was considered low at the start of the campaign, and he began a tour of local party structures early on. On 22 December, Petru presented a proposed composition of the party's management. The proposition included most of his leadership election opponents: Michał Kobosko (first vice-chair), Joanna Mucha (second vice-chair), Rafał Kasprzyk (general secretary), Paulina Hennig-Kloska (member of the management) and Katarzyna Pełczyńska-Nałęcz (member of the management), and also non-opponent Paweł Śliz (member of the management) as well as Katarzyna Karpa-Świderek as party spokesperson.

Petru was eliminated in the first round, gaining 14% of the vote. For the second round, he endorsed Hennig-Kloska.

=== Bartosz Romowicz ===
Bartosz Romowicz registered as a candidate on 10 December, despite not announcing his candidacy beforehand. Romowicz began his political career in the Polish People's Party (PSL), formerly an electoral partner of Poland 2050 in the Third Way alliance. He was elected as the mayor of Ustrzyki Dolne in 2014, serving until 2023, when he became a member of the Sejm. He ran for a seat in the Sejm in 2011 and the Senate in 2019 on the lists of PSL, failing both bids, before joining Poland 2050 in 2021 and getting elected to the Sejm in 2023.

In an interview for Polskie Radio 24, Romowicz stated that Poland 2050 "[didn't] want to be a party about Szymon Hołownia", but one that "implements its program".

Romowicz withdrew from the election on 9 January, a day prior to the first round.

== Candidates ==
=== Candidates in the second round ===
Candidate	Born	Political office	Announced
Paulina Hennig-Kloska	5 October 1977; Gniezno, Poland	Minister of Climate and Environment (2023–present); Member of the Sejm (2015–present)	28 November 2025
Katarzyna Pełczyńska-Nałęcz	26 October 1970; Warsaw, Poland	Minister of Funds and Regional Policy (2023–present)	21 November 2025

=== Candidates eliminated in the first round ===
Candidate	Born	Political office	Announced
Rafał Kasprzyk	27 August 1971; Busko-Zdrój, Poland	Member of the Sejm (2023–present)	8 December 2025
Joanna Mucha	12 April 1976; Płońsk, Poland	Member of the Sejm (2007–present); Minister of Sport and Tourism (2011–2013)	29 October 2025
Ryszard Petru	6 July 1972; Wrocław, Poland	Member of the Sejm (2015–2019, 2023–present); Leader of Modern (2015–2017)	1 October 2025

=== Withdrawn candidates ===
Candidate	Born	Political office	Announced	Withdrew
Michał Kobosko	15 April 1968; Płońsk, Poland	Member of the European Parliament (2024–present); Member of the Sejm (2023–2024); Leader of the Poland 2050 (2020–2022)	22 November 2025	30 December 2025
Bartosz Romowicz	14 June 1988; Lesko, Poland	Member of the Sejm (2023–present)	— (Note: Romowicz registered his candidacy on 10 December without announcing it beforehand.)	9 January 2026

=== Media speculation ===
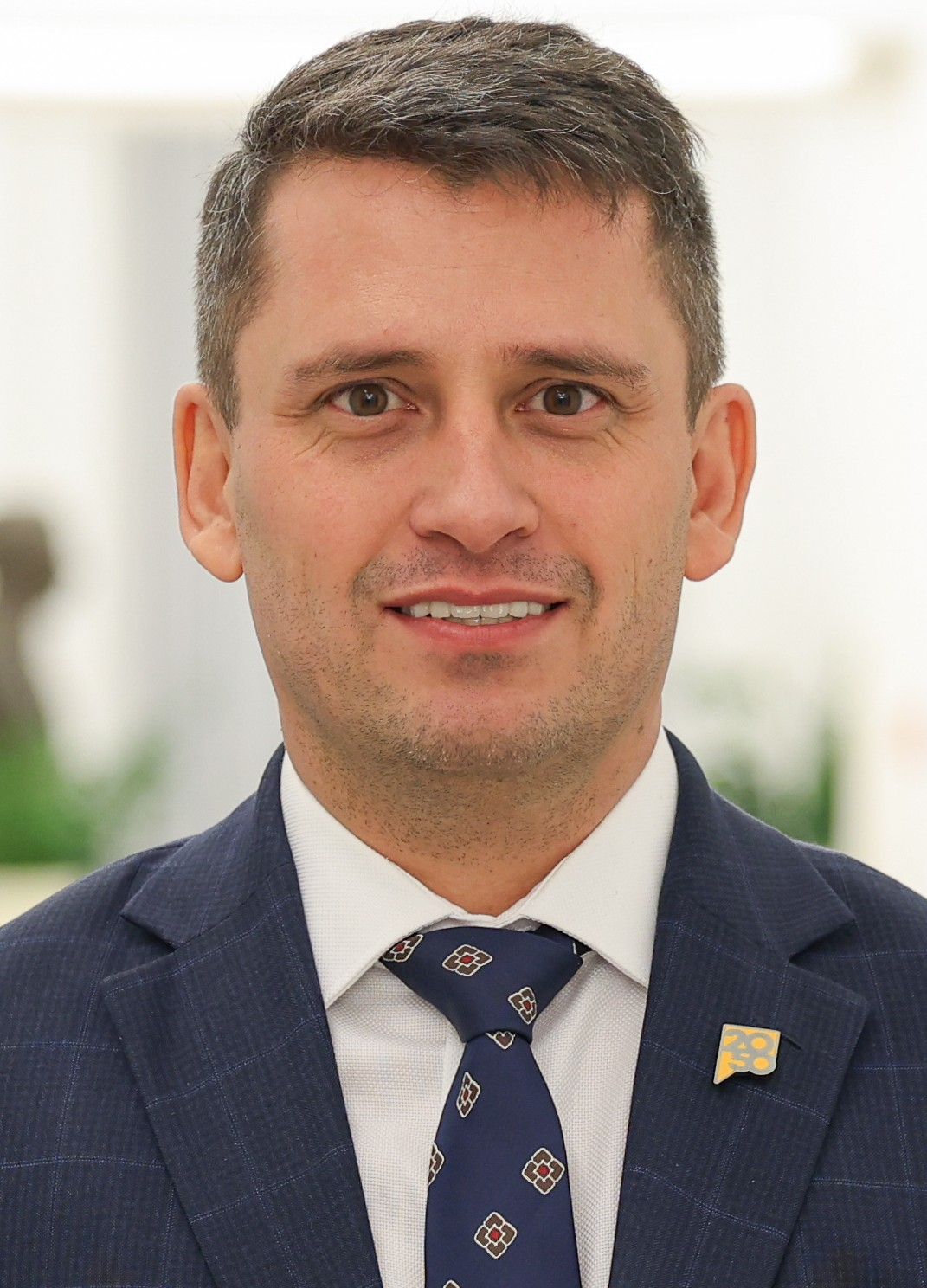
Paweł Śliz in 2025

Media reported Hennig-Kloska, Kobosko, Mucha and Pełczyńska-Nałęcz as candidates for the election. It also speculated about a possible candidacy of Paweł Śliz, the chairman of the Poland 2050 parliamentary club, as a possible candidate for party leader, especially as an ally of Pełczyńska-Nałęcz if she chose not to contest.

== Endorsements ==
In an interview with Fakt, PL2050 posełs Norbert Pietrykowski and Ewa Szymanowska expressed their preferences for Petru and Kobosko, respectively. Most other members favoured Hennig-Kloska, Kobosko or Pełczyńska-Nałęcz. Party vice-chairman Michał Gramatyka stated that Paweł Śliz was the most fitting candidate for leader, although he ultimately didn't run. Senator Jacek Trela endorsed Joanna Mucha. PL2050 parliamentary club leader Paweł Śliz endorsed Pełczyńska-Nałęcz. Aleksandra Leo endorsed Hennig-Kloska. Izabela Bodnar, a former poseł of the party, also endorsed Hennig-Kloska.

Following his withdrawal before the first round, Kobosko expressed his support for Hennig-Kloska, Mucha and Petru. In the second round, Petru, Kasprzyk and Mucha all endorsed Hennig-Kloska. Shortly before the runoff, Szymon Hołownia sent an SMS message to party's politicians. According to Petru, the message stated that Hołownia supports neither of the runoff candidates, and hopes that party's camps would unite after the election. He also published a letter stating his non-endorsement of any either candidate, but that he would vote for the candidate that would seek to preserve the party's autonomy. Regardless of no official endorsement, Newsweek states that this gesture was interpreted by party politicians as an endorsement of Pełczyńska-Nałęcz.

== Opinion polls ==
An SW Research poll for Wprost conducted on 7 January 2026 among a sample of the general population asking for preferences for the election's winner found Petru with the highest support (14.2%), ahead of Mucha (8.9%), Pełczyńska-Nałęcz (7.9%), Hennig-Kloska (5.2%), Romowicz (3.3%), Kasprzyk (3.1%) and "someone else" (6.9%), although a majority — 50.5% of respondents — had no opinion.

According to an Opinia24 poll for RMF FM, 27% of Poles wanted the party to have a Deputy Prime Minister, whereas 39% did not.

Another SW Research poll for Wprost conducted on 20–21 January 2026 found that most respondents — 43.1% — believed Poland 2050 will disintegrate before the next (2027) parliamentary election, and only 23.4% believed otherwise.

A Pollster poll for Super Express conducted on 26–27 January 2026 found that most respondents were pessimistic about the party's future, with 46% convinced the party won't survive without Hołownia, and 31% believing it could still function without its outgoing leader.

Following the election, an SW Research poll for Onet conducted on 4 February 2026 found that 17.5% of respondents believed Pełczyńska-Nałęcz would be a good leader for Poland 2050, with 26.3% believing otherwise and others having no opinion.

An Ariadna poll for Wirtualna Polska taken after the creation of Centre on 18–19 February 2026 found that 21% of respondents believed the formation of Centre was good, and 24% believed it was bad. According to the same poll, asking for who was to blame for the split in PL2050, 35% answered everyone was to blame, 17% blamed Hołownia, 9% blamed Pełczyńska-Nałęcz with her allies and 9% blamed Hennig-Kloska with her allies.

== Results ==
=== Leadership election ===
Candidate	1st round		2nd round	
Candidate	Vote	%	Vote	%
Katarzyna Pełczyńska-Nałęcz ✓	277	42.23	350	53.27
Paulina Hennig-Kloska	131	19.97	307	46.73
Joanna Mucha	119	18.14	Eliminated	
Ryszard Petru	95	14.48	Eliminated	
Rafał Kasprzyk	34	5.18	Eliminated	
Total	656	100.00	657	100.00
Source: Poland 2050

=== National Board election ===
On 7 February, the party held an election for four seats to the National Board, which would become vice-chairs of the party.

Candidate	1st round		2nd round	
Candidate	Vote	%	Vote	%
Paulina Hennig-Kloska ✓	?	?		
Rafał Kasprzyk ✓	?	?		
Sławomir Ćwik ✓	?	?		
Szymon Hołownia ✓	(Note: According to Gazeta Wyborcza, Hołownia defeated Koniuch in a runoff by a difference of one vote after the two gained the same number of votes in the first round of the election.)	?		?
Michał Koniuch		?		?
Source: Polish Press Agency

Ćwik, Hennig-Kloska and Kasprzyk lost their positions shortly after, leaving Poland 2050 to form the Centre parliamentary group.

== Conduct ==
=== Incidents in the first round ===
In the first round of the leadership election, 32 incidents of not receiving election emails were reported. Onet reported that around 100 members were excluded from voting due to not paying the party membership fee, and raised concerns over the unverifiability of whether all of the votes in the first round came from actual party members.

=== Annulment of the second round ===
Runoff voting took place between 16:00 and 22:00 on 12 January, and was to be announced within an hour afterwards. However, at night from 12 to 13 January 2026, the party announced that the runoff election has been invalidated because of technical difficulties, with the election form closing at 21:00, an hour prior to the intended end. Party members also complained about not receiving links to the voting form, depriving them of the right to vote. The party's executive board praised the election commission for "swiftly, responsibly, in accordance with procedures, immediately interrupting the voting and invalidating the second round without reading its results." On 13 January, the party informed that it had notified the Internal Security Agency and the National Public Prosecutor's Office of external interference in the electoral process, stating that it had received over 26,000 (Note: According to a tweet by Michał Gramatyka, the exact number of answers was 26,483.) unanthorized votes. On 15 January, the chief of the election commission, Maurycy Przyrowski, resigned from his post, and was later replaced by Marta Cienkowska.

A Business Insider investigation identified several issues that could have occurred in the second round of the election, investigating the Interankiety (Responsly platform) survey service the election commission had used for the leadership election. One of the identified issues was the multiple answers option being enabled, which allowed for voters to vote for both candidates. Other possible problems included the survey passwords being disabled, a survey answer limit under some subscriptions to the service, or issues regarding the time period of the vote. Interia suggested that party members sharing the link to the vote on social media on images or videos could have been responsible for the overflow from party non-affiliates attempting to sign in to the vote. In a statement published the following day, Interankiety (Responsly platform) said that Poland 2050 had used the platform in a standard self-service SaaS model, that the account used for the vote had been automatically blocked for security reasons because of a very large number of requests to access the form in a short period of time, and that its technical analysis did not confirm that any additional responses had been recorded in the system.

=== Incidents regarding the 16–19 January National Council meeting ===
Following the annulment of the second round, outgoing leader Szymon Hołownia announced that he would call the party's National Council at the earliest possible date — 16 January at 18:30 CET — one day earlier than previously scheduled (17 January), to determine a new timetable regarding the election, and whether to repeat only the second round, or both rounds of the election. Another concern during this period was the party leadership's term officially ending on 21 January, which could cause a legal dispute had new leadership not been elected by that point.

The 16 January National Council meeting began at 18:30 CET, but ended early at ~23:00 after Hołownia abruptly left the meeting. Agnieszka Buczyńska took over the proceedings, declaring a break until 19 January at 18:00 CET. According to TVN 24, Hołownia's departure was caused by "[the realization] that votes on certain issues were not going his way". During the meeting, Hołownia declared his support for repeating both rounds of the election, in which he would run for party leader. He also demanded that both Pełczyńska-Nałęcz and Hennig-Kloska be found in the party's National Board.

Before the resumption of the National Council meeting on 19 January, Hołownia announced he was giving up responsibility for the party's decisions to Pełczyńska-Nałęcz and Hennig-Kloska, ruling out running in the election. Likewise before the meeting, Pełczyńska-Nałęcz issued a letter to the party offering Hennig-Kloska for both of the second-round candidates to co-lead the party by a decision of the National Council, although Hennig-Kloska rejected the idea. The National Council ultimately decided to schedule the repeated second round for 31 January, with the National Board election scheduled for 7 February. Hołownia did not participate in the resumed meeting.

== Controversies ==
=== Internal party conflict ===
The situation in the party during the election campaign was described as internally polarized between the camps of Katarzyna Pełczyńska-Nałęcz's supporters and her opponents. In early January, outgoing leader Szymon Hołownia described the election campaign as a destructive period in the party. Later, he stated that the party became "unrecognizable" during the election period.

The election campaign was marked by accusations of treason between the factions of the party. In December, Hołownia complained of a "szmalcownik" leaking the party's internal messages. In early January, Hołownia accused Michał Kobosko of betraying the party by holding discussions with prime minister Donald Tusk without prior consultation with the party. According to OKO.press, Bartosz Romowicz insinuated Ryszard Petru was leaking the party's information and "wishing ill upon the entire organization". Later, on 23 January, Hołownia outright stated Petru was intentionally damaging the party, questioning why he remained in its ranks.

It was speculated that the election would result in the secession of the losing faction from the party, with posełs leaving Poland 2050 for the Civic Coalition, Polish People's Party, Law and Justice, or creating their own party. After the runoff on 12 January was annulled, both camps also openly accused each other of preparing a split or alining with other parties — Hennig-Kloska was accused of having an agreement with Prime Minister Donald Tusk and his liberal-conservative Civic Coalition, while Pełczyńska-Nałęcz was accused of planning an alliance with Adrian Zandberg and his left-wing Razem party for the next election. Between 10 and 12 January, 10 posełs, supporters of Hołownia and Pełczyńska-Nałęcz — around 1/3rd of the party's parliamentary representation, including Hołownia himself — left the parliamentary group's Signal group chat.

On 22 January, Aleksandra Leo was removed as co-chair of the party's parliamentary group, replaced by Bartosz Romowicz, after accusations that she had been planning a "putsch" in selecting the parliamentary group's National Council representation by conducting the vote to fill in the outgoing term without the presence of chairman Paweł Śliz. Leo disputed these accusations.

In an interview on 26 January, Hołownia stated that he would exit Poland 2050 if either Pełczyńska-Nałęcz or Hennig-Kloska took control over the party.

=== Second round annullment disputes ===
According to Rzeczpospolita, following the annulment of the election, supporters of Hennig-Kloska alleged that the real reason for the invalidation of the runoff was because "Katarzyna Pełczyńska-Nałęcz and her camp realised that they were losing". Pełczyńska-Nałęcz supporters denounced the allegation as absurd. Similarly, it was alleged by TVN 24 that the pausing of the 16 January National Council meeting was caused "[the realization] that votes on certain issues were not going [Szymon Hołownia's] way", and that Hołownia was using "emotional blackmail" to convince opponents to repeat both rounds of the election.

=== External influence in the election ===
In a letter to the party a day before the 12 January runoff, Hołownia accused Poland 2050's allies of trying to destroy the party. Throughout the election, Donald Tusk was accused of trying to influence the election by refusing to talk with Pełczyńska-Nałęcz. Tusk also privately praised Pełczyńska-Nałęcz's opponent, Hennig-Kloska.

wPolityce.pl, a right-wing news outlet, accused other news outlets — Onet and TVN 24 — of attempting to interfere in the party's leadership election against Pełczyńska-Nałęcz.

Following the runoff invalidation, the party notified the Internal Security Agency and the National Public Prosecutor's Office of external interference in the electoral process, stating that it had received over 26,000 unauthorized votes.

== Analysis ==
Analysis of the election showed that whatever the outcome of the election turned out to be, Poland 2050 would have a difficult time becoming a significant political force in the country.

=== Media speculation ===
Media speculated several possible flash points for the formal breakup between the party's two factions. Rzeczpospolita believed that the National Council meeting on 16 January could have led to a split between Hołownia and Pełczyńska-Nałęcz loyalists on one side, and the camp of Paulina Hennig-Kloska on the other. Newsweek speculated that after the 12 January second round invalidation, any election result would cause a split in the party. OKO.press likewise stated that the party could fall apart regardless of who wins the election. The term of party leadership officially ending on 21 January caused concerns of a possible legal dispute had new leadership not been elected by that point, considering any decision regarding the subject had been delayed several times.

After Hołownia declared his intention to leave the party if either candidate took control over the party, media speculated who else would leave the party with him. RMF FM speculated posełs Agnieszka Buczyńska, Adriana Porowska, Bartosz Romowicz, Kamil Wnuk and Łukasz Osmalak. Interia presented a larger list of Buczyńska, Elżbieta Burkiewicz, Adam Gomoła, Piotr Górnikiewicz, Michał Gramatyka, Adam Luboński, Maja Nowak, Barbara Okuła, Osmalak, Romowicz, Piotr Strach, Paweł Śliz and Wnuk.

Newsweek speculated Poland 2050 could possibly remove the Tusk government from power and form a new coalition with Law and Justice and the Confederation, placing Pełczyńska-Nałęcz as the new Prime Minister, but that she could have a difficult time convincing enough of the party's posełs to the idea.

== Aftermath ==
Katarzyna Pełczyńska-Nałęcz emerged victorious. She announced her victory on X (formerly Twitter). Paulina Hennig-Kloska issued a congratulatory statement the next day. Pełczyńska-Nałęcz had her first press conference as party leader on 2 February, appearing alongside Hennig-Kloska, who she endorsed for the party to elect to its National Board. She also announced that she would not stop pursuing the position of Deputy Prime Minister, stating that her party affirmed her to the position several times.

In the month following Pełczyńska-Nałęcz's victory, the party would suffer a major split. By 18 February, all of her opponents in the leadership election left the party. 15 MPs chose to form the Centre parliamentary group. Several months later, on 22 October, Pełczyńska-Nałęcz would resign from party leadership in the aftermath of internal struggles and opposition from some party MPs and a number of coalition partners, triggering another leadership election.
