= Żaneta Cwalina-Śliwowska =

Polish politician (born 1978)

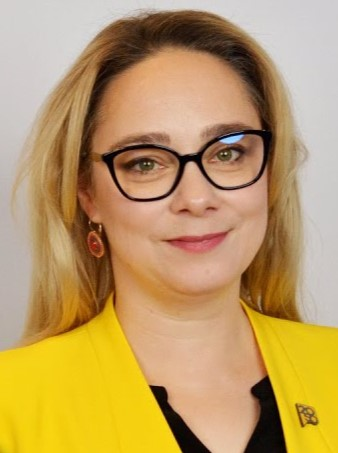
- Cwalina-Śliwowska in 2024

Member of the Sejm
- Incumbent
- Assumed office 13 November 2023
- Constituency: No. 18

Personal details
- Born: 10 December 1978 (age 47) Ostrołęka, Poland
- Party: Poland 2050 (2023-2026); Independent (2026); Centre (2026-present)
- Education: University of Zielona Góra; SGH Warsaw School of Economics

Żaneta Cwalina-Śliwowska (Polish: [ʐaˈnɛ.ta t͡sfaˈli.na ɕliˈvɔf.ska]; born 10 December 1978) is a Polish politician and competitive dance trainer. Since 2019, she has served as a member of the Sejm of Poland. She was a member of the Poland 2050 party, which she left on 14 February 2026.

== Biography ==
Żaneta Cwalina-Śliwowska was born on 10 December 1978 in Ostrołęka, Poland. She obtained a master's degree in social pedagogy from the University of Zielona Góra, and a diploma in cultural management after postgraduate studies at the SGH Warsaw School of Economics. Cwalina-Śliwowska worked as a competitive dance coach and sports event organizer. She took the position of president of the Association for Development Through Dance "Progres" based in Ostrołęka. From 2021 to 2023, she held the position of vice president of the Majorettes Sports Association.

Cwalina-Śliwowska joined the Poland 2050 party of Szymon Hołownia and became the secretary of its branch in Siedlce. In the 2023 parliamentary elections, she ran for the Sejm from the second place on the Third Way list in the constituency no. 18, encompassing the eastern Masovian Voivodeship. She was elected, receiving 9,747 votes.

On 14 February 2026, Cwalina-Śliwowska left Poland 2050 due to the internal factional conflict that emerged within the party after the 2026 Poland 2050 leadership election. Cwalina-Śliwowska stated that her decision was caused by a resolution passed and proposed by party chairman Katarzyna Pełczyńska-Nałęcz to block personnel changes in the party until 21 March, criticizing the resolution as "undemocratic" and "embarrassing". She announced that despite having left the party, she will remain in the parliamentary circle of Poland 2050 to display the "defectiveness" of the resolution.

== Personal life ==
She and her husband live in Ostrołęka, Poland.
