= Bartosz Romowicz =

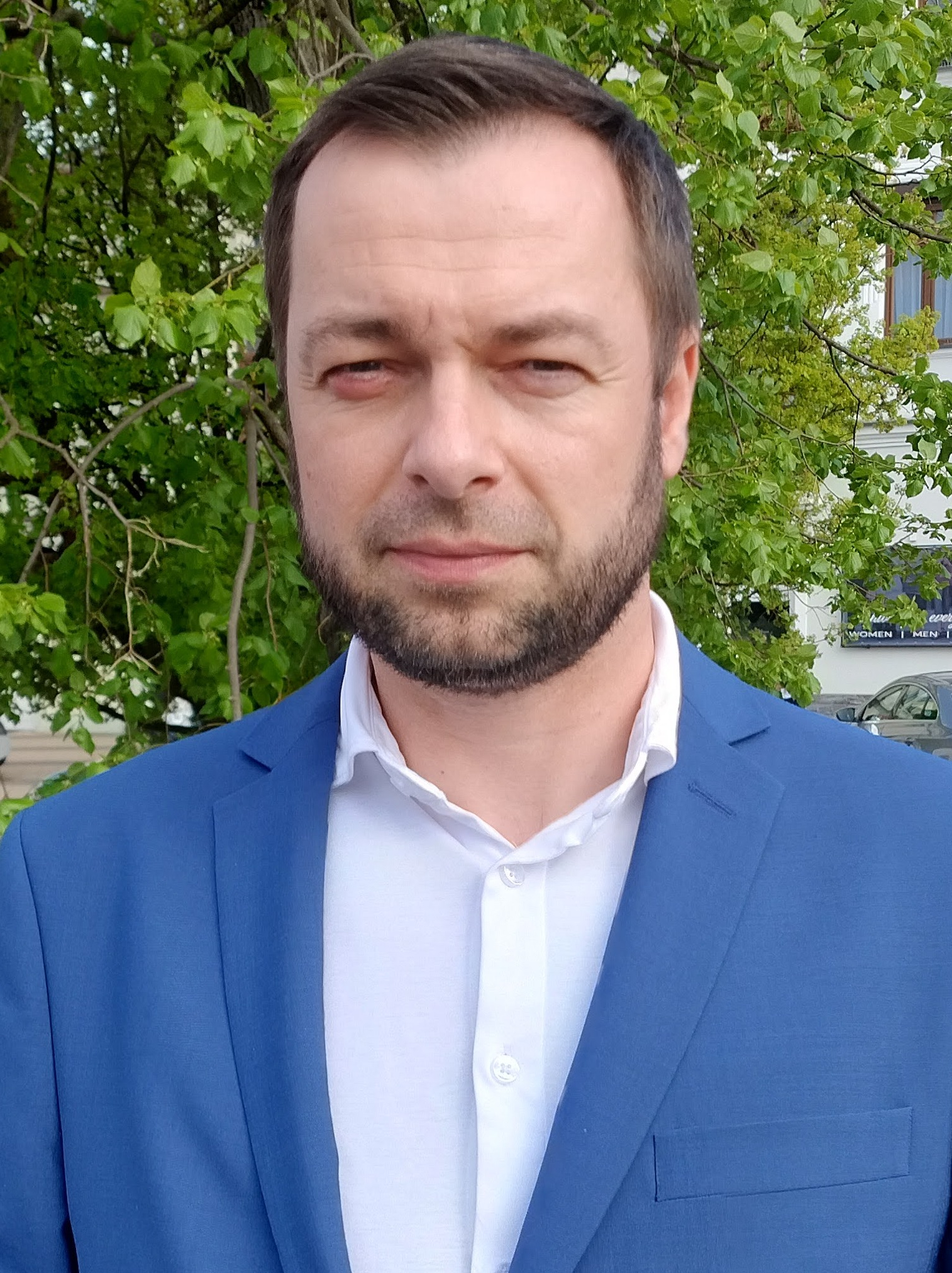
- Romowicz in 2025

Member of the Sejm
- Incumbent
- Assumed office 13 November 2023
- Constituency: No. 22 (Krosno)

Personal details
- Born: 14 June 1988 (age 37) Lesko, Poland
- Party: Poland 2050 (after 2021); Polish People's Party (until 2021)
- Other political affiliations: Third Way (until 2025)

Bartosz Romowicz (born 14 June 1988 in Lesko) is a Polish politician, economist and teacher, mayor of Ustrzyki Dolne (2014–2023) and poseł for the 10th term Sejm.

== Biography ==
Romowicz was born on 14 June 1988 in Lesko. He graduated the Catholic University of Lublin and Kraków University of Economics, later getting employed as a teacher in the University of Information Technology and Management in Rzeszow.

In 2006, he unsuccessfully ran for the council of Ustrzyki Dolne. He joined the Polish People's Party, and in 2011 he ran on its list for a seat in the country's Sejm. In 2014 he was elected as a mayor of Ustrzyki Dolne on his own electoral committee, and was reelected in 2018. In 2019 he unsuccessfully ran for the Senate, gaining 81,983 votes.

In 2021, he joined Poland 2050 of Szymon Hołownia, becoming the leader of the party's subcarpathian chapter. In 2023, he was elected to the Sejm in constituency 22, running on the list of the Third Way alliance, earning 21,527 votes. In December 2023 he was chosen as deputy leader of the Sejm investigative commission for the unheld 2020 correspondence elections.

== Electoral history ==
Election	Electoral Committee	Office	District	Result
2011	Polish People's Party	Sejm (7th term)	no. 22	257 (0,09%) ✗
2019	Polish People's Party	Senate (10th term)	no. 58	81,983 (35,25%) ✗
2023	Third Way	Sejm (10th term)	no. 22	21,527 (4,87%) ✓

== Private life ==
He is the son of Wiesław and Elżbieta, and married to Małgorzatą. He has a daughter, Kalina.
