= Sejm Constituency no. 22 =

Polish parliamentary constituency

Sejm Constituency no. 22 Krosno
- Okręg wyborczy nr 22; Krosno
- Constituency for the Sejm
- Location within Poland
- Counties: Krosno (city county), Przemyśl (city county), Bieszczady, Brzozów, Jarosław, Jasło, Krosno, Lesko, Lubaczów, Przemyśl, Przeworsk, Sanok,
- Voivodeship: Subcarpathian Voivodeship
- Electorate: 662,734 (2023)

Current constituency
- Created: 2001
- Seats: 11
- Regional assembly: Subcarpathian Voivodeship Sejmik
- Senate constituency: no. 57 and 58
- EP constituency: Podkarpackie

Krosno, officially known as Constituency no. 22, is a Polish parliamentary constituency in the Subcarpathian Voivodeship. It elects eleven members of the Sejm.

The constituency is nicknamed after the city of Krosno and covers southern and eastern counties of the voivodeship.

== List of deputies ==
Deputies for the 10th Sejm (2023–2027)
| Deputy | Party | Parliamentary group |
|---|---|---|
| Marek Kuchciński | Law and Justice | Law and Justice |
| Anna Schmidt-Rodziewicz | Law and Justice | Law and Justice |
| Piotr Uruski | Sovereign Poland | Law and Justice |
| Maria Kurowska | Sovereign Poland | Law and Justice |
| Teresa Pamuła | Law and Justice | Law and Justice |
| Piotr Babinetz | Law and Justice | Law and Justice |
| Tadeusz Chrzan | Law and Justice | Law and Justice |
| Joanna Frydrych | Civic Platform | Civic Coalition |
| Marek Rząsa | Civic Platform | Civic Coalition |
| Bartosz Romowicz | Poland 2050 | Third Way |
| Andrzej Tomasz Zapałowski | Independent | Confederation |

== Election results ==
=== 2023 ===
2023 parliamentary election: Krosno
| Electoral committee | Votes | % | Seats |
|---|---|---|---|
| Law and Justice | 241,790 | 54.70 | 7 |
| Civic Coalition | 70,054 | 15.85 | 2 |
| Third Way | 60,938 | 13.79 | 1 |
| Confederation | 38,080 | 8.62 | 1 |
| The Left | 19,750 | 4.47 | – |
| Nonpartisan Local Government Activists | 9,165 | 2.07 | – |
| Peace and Prosperity Movement | 2,219 | 0.50 | – |
| Total | 441,996 | 100.00 | 11 |
| Valid votes | 441,996 | 98.20 | |
| Invalid/blank votes | 8,120 | 1.80 | |
| Total votes | 450,116 | 100.00 | |
| Registered voters/turnout | 662,734 | 67.92 | |
Source: National Electoral Commission
