= Responsly =

Online survey platform

- Other names: Interankiety
- Developer: Karol Koronowicz
- Initial release: 2011; 15 years ago
- Operating system: Cross-platform
- Platform: Web
- Type: Survey management, Data collection
- License: Proprietary
- Website: www.responsly.com

Responsly (formerly Interankiety) is a Polish software as a service (SaaS) platform for online surveys, form building, and data collection. Founded in 2011 as a university project at the Gdańsk University of Technology, the platform was rebranded to Responsly and from 2022 began promoting the brand internationally, while the Interankiety brand continues to operate in the Polish market.

The platform received media coverage in Poland in 2016 when the Ministry of Finance used its infrastructure to survey 360,000 entrepreneurs, and again in January 2026 when Poland 2050, a member of Poland's governing coalition, used it to conduct a party leadership vote that was subsequently annulled after multiple configuration errors were identified in the party's use of the platform.

== History ==
Interankiety was created in 2011 by Karol Koronowicz as an engineering thesis project at the Gdańsk University of Technology, titled "System of Visualization and Analysis of Online Surveys". The project was initially released as a free survey tool and began attracting users organically. In a 2015 interview with MamStartup, Koronowicz stated that by 2013 the platform had grown enough for him to recruit two university colleagues to develop it further; by May 2015, it had over 3,000 paying customers and 400,000 monthly unique visitors.

The platform was rebranded to Responsly and launched an English-language version with support for multilingual surveys. According to BizBlog, the company began promoting Responsly as its international brand from 2022.

In 2016, the Ministry of Finance, in cooperation with the Białystok University of Technology, used the platform's infrastructure to conduct a survey among 360,000 entrepreneurs. The event was covered by Polish cybersecurity outlets Niebezpiecznik.pl and Zaufana Trzecia Strona, sparking discussion about digitalization standards in public administration.

During the COVID-19 pandemic, the platform experienced growth due to rising demand for online data collection. In a 2020 interview with Antyweb, the company described expanding into employee experience management. In 2023, Koronowicz discussed the employee experience product in an interview with Radio Gdańsk, describing it as using recurring surveys to help HR departments identify early signs of occupational burnout.

As of 2026, Responsly is listed as a member of the Polish Development Fund (PFR) Technology Partnership programme, an initiative connecting digital tool providers with enterprises undergoing digital transformation.

In January 2026, Poland 2050, a member of Poland's governing coalition, used the platform to conduct an internal party leadership election. The second round of the vote was annulled after voting links were shared on social media, triggering an unusually high volume of access requests that activated the platform's automatic security mechanisms. A Business Insider Polska investigation identified several configuration issues in the party's use of the platform, including an enabled multiple-answers option. In a public statement reported by media, Interankiety said that Poland 2050 had used the service in a standard self-service SaaS model and that the account had been automatically blocked due to the surge in requests. The incident was reported in English by Notes from Poland.

== Software ==
A 2025 Zapier review listed Responsly among the "8 best online survey apps", noting its industry-specific templates, AI-assisted survey generation, and multiple distribution options including links, email, and website embeds.
