= Jacek Bury =

Polish politician (born 1967)

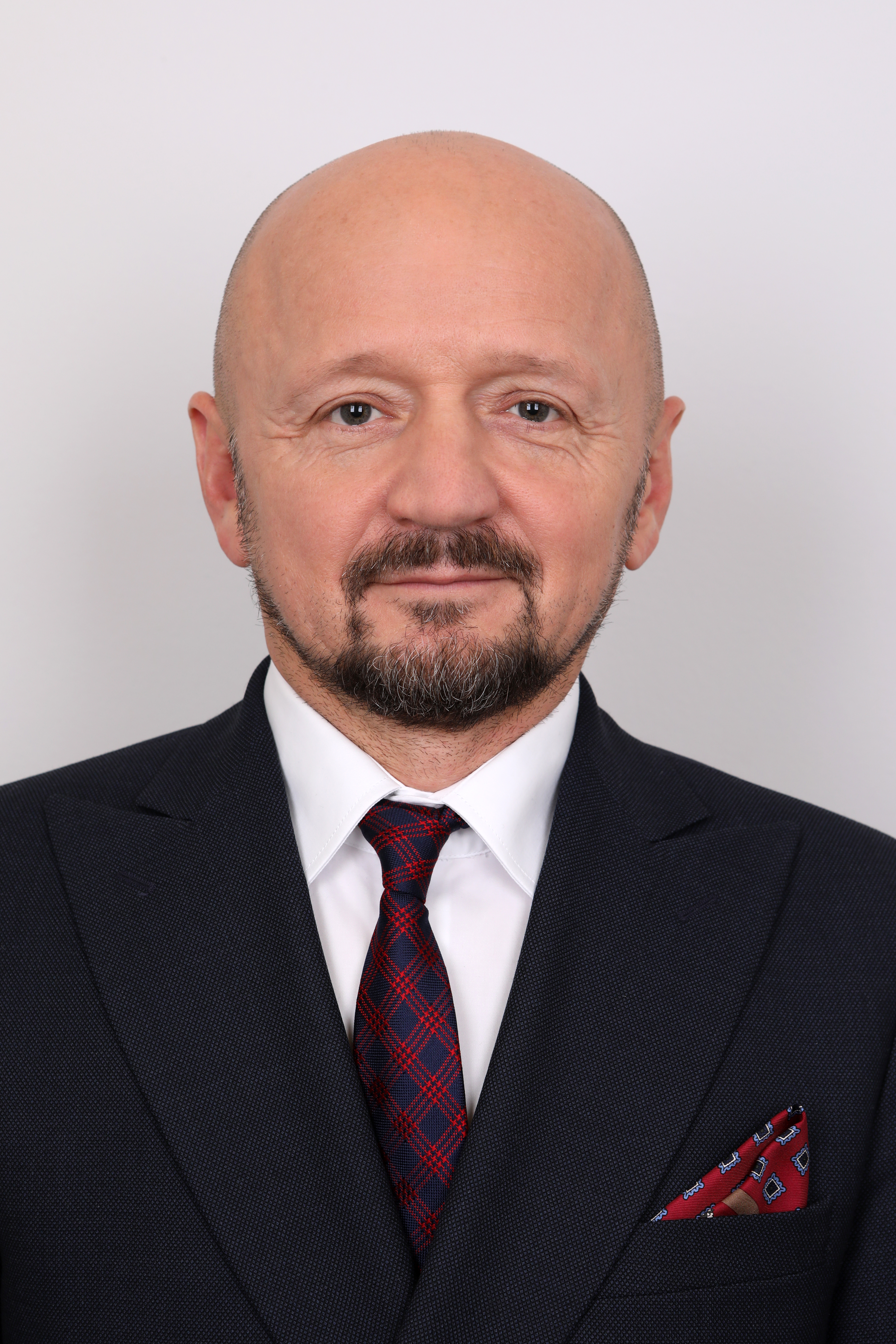

Member of the Senate of Poland
- In office 12 November 2019 – 13 November 2023
- Constituency: 16 - Lublin

Member of the Lublin Regional Assembly
- In office 2018–2019

Personal details
- Born: 1 January 1967 (age 58)
- Political party: Modern (2015–2019); Poland 2050 (2021–2025)

Jacek Bury (born 1 January 1967) is a Polish politician. He was elected to the Senate of Poland (10th term) representing the constituency of Lublin.
