= Adriana Porowska =

Polish politician (born 1978)

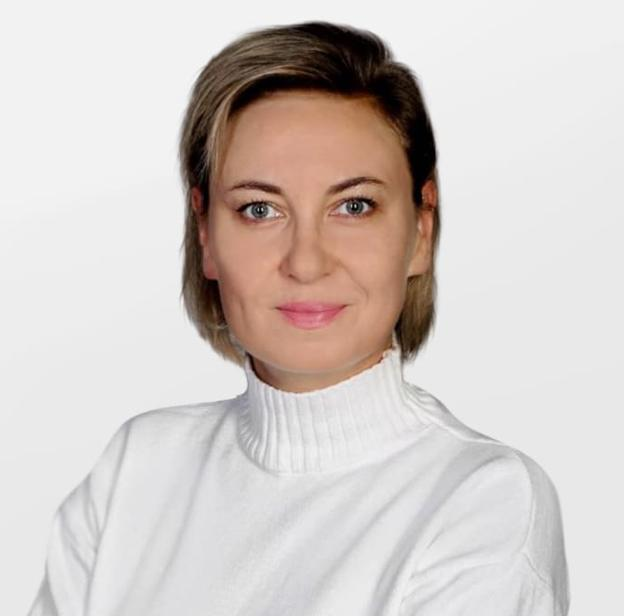
- Porowska in 2024

Secretary of State in the Chancellery of the Prime Minister of Poland
- Incumbent
- Assumed office 25 July 2025

Minister for Civil Society
- In office 16 October 2024 – 24 July 2025
- Prime Minister: Donald Tusk
- Preceded by: Agnieszka Buczyńska
- Succeeded by: Office established

Personal details
- Born: Adriana Magdalena Białczak; 26 October 1978 (age 47) Mrągowo, Olsztyn Voivodeship, Polish People's Republic
- Party: Poland 2050
- Education: ChAT

Adriana Porowska (born 26 October 1978) is a Polish politician, from 2024 to 2025, she held the office of the Minister for Civil Society. She previously served as deputy mayor of Warsaw.
