= Agnieszka Buczyńska =

Polish politician

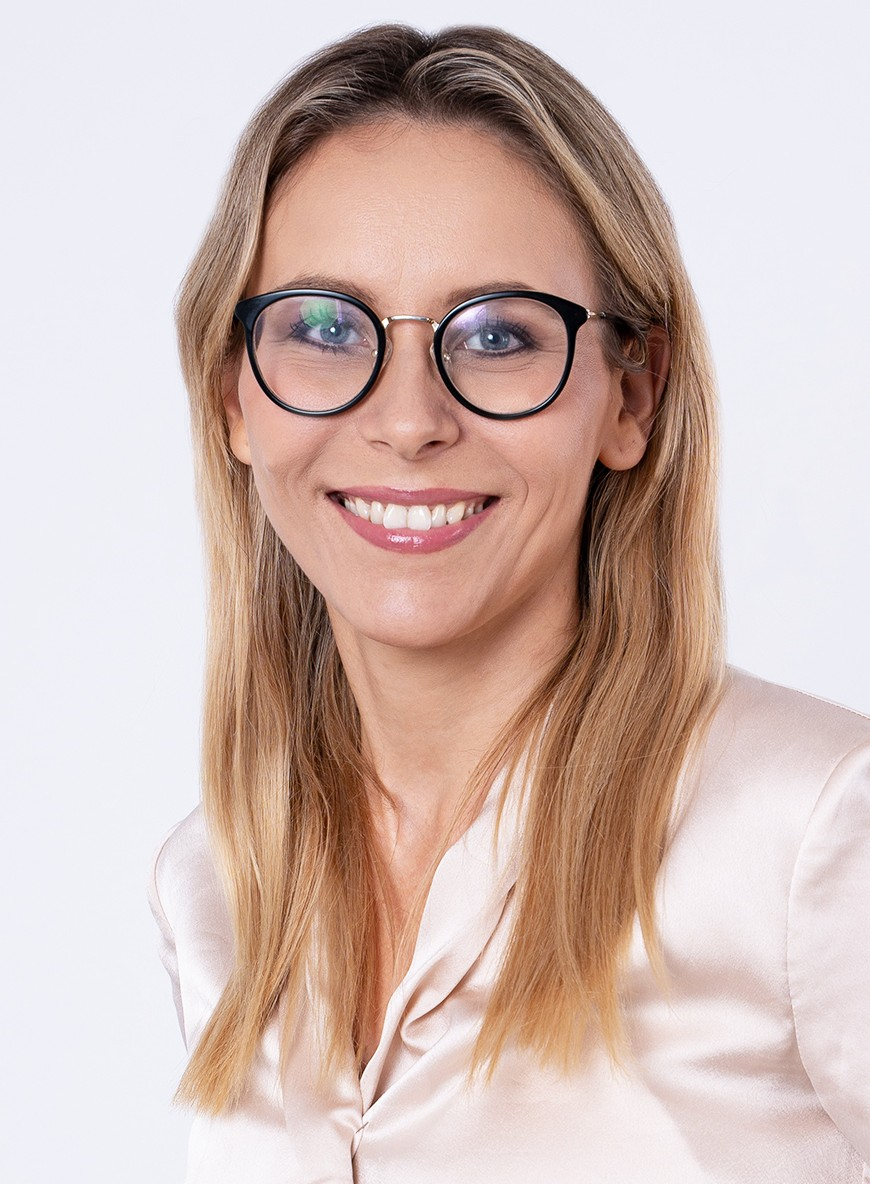
- Buczyńska in 2023

Minister for Civil Society
- In office 13 December 2023 – 16 October 2024
- Prime Minister: Donald Tusk
- Preceded by: position established
- Succeeded by: Adriana Porowska

Member of the Sejm
- Incumbent
- Assumed office 13 November 2023
- Constituency: 25-Gdańsk

Personal details
- Born: Agnieszka Buczyńska; 22 September 1986 (age 39) Tczew, Gdańsk Voivodeship, Polish People's Republic
- Party: Poland 2050 (2020–present)
- Children: 2
- Education: University of Gdańsk; Collegium Civitas
- Occupation: politician

Agnieszka Buczyńska (born 22 September 1986) is a Polish politician for Poland 2050, and a native of the ethnocultural region of Kociewie. She has been a Member of the Sejm since 2023.

== Biography ==
Buczyńska holds a bachelor's degree in political science from the University of Gdańsk and a master's degree in sociology from Collegium Civitas. She is an advocate for volunteering and civil society projects and has stated that one of the reasons she entered politics was in order to give non-governmental organisation's a voice.

In 2019 Buczyńska was standing on stage nearby the Gdańsk mayor Paweł Adamowicz when he was murdered during the finale of the Great Orchestra of Christmas Charity concert. Following a police investigation she was charged with failure to fulfill official duties and endangering event participants in February 2020. Buczyńska was later acquitted of all the charges brought against her.

== Political career ==
Following the 2023 election Buczyńska was appointed as the minister for civil society. On October 16, 2024, as a result of her resignation from government functions for health reasons, she was dismissed from the Council of Ministers.
