= Piotr Uruski =

Polish politician (born 1976)

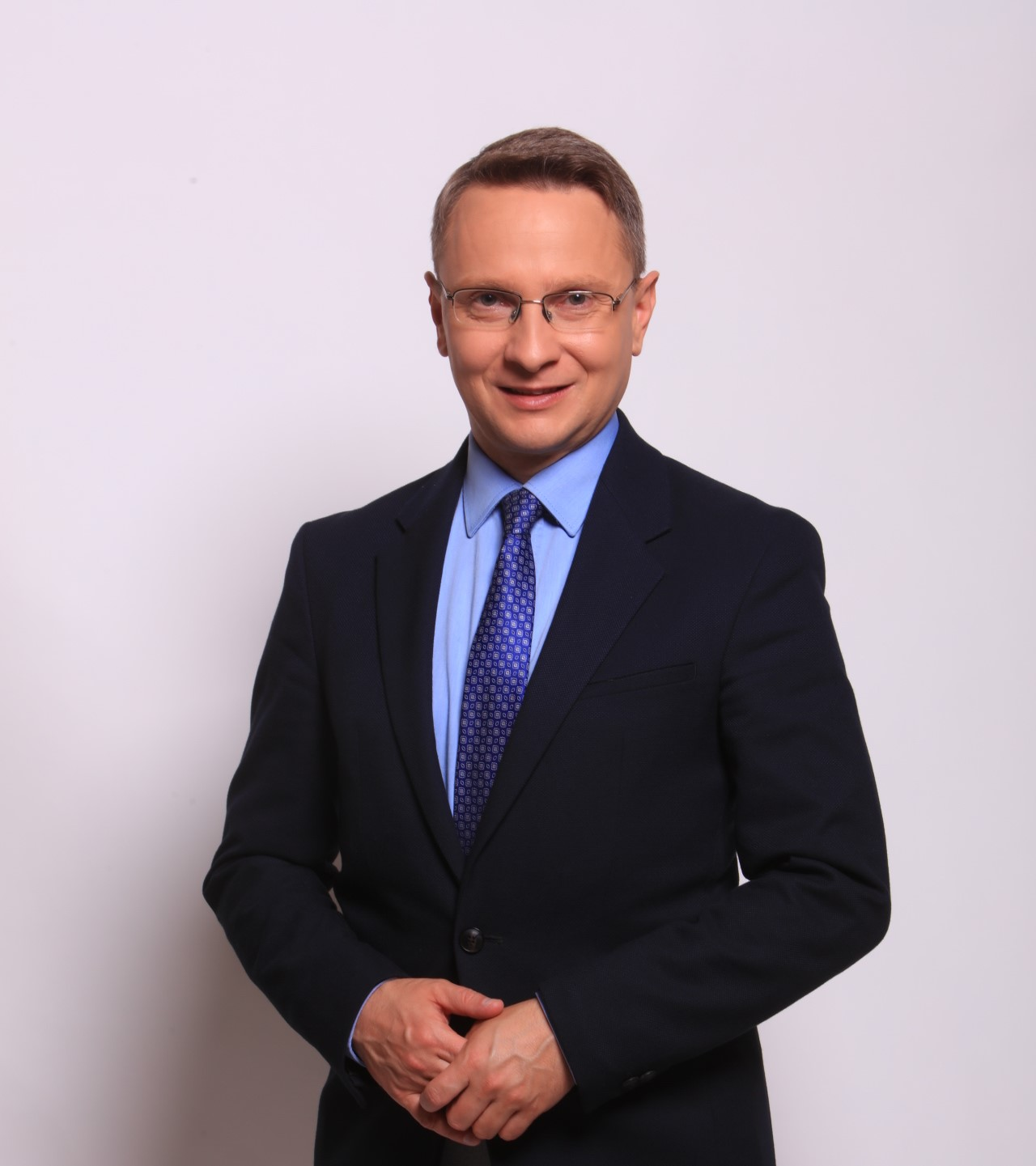
- Uruski in 2023

Member of the Sejm
- Incumbent
- Assumed office 12 November 2015
- Constituency: Krosno

Personal details
- Born: 11 August 1976 (age 49)
- Party: Law and Justice (since 2024)
- Other political affiliations: Sovereign Poland (2012–2024)

Piotr Uruski (born 11 August 1976) is a Polish politician serving as a member of the Sejm since 2015. From 2014 to 2015, he served as deputy mayor of Sanok.
