= Michał Gramatyka =

Polish politician (born 1971)

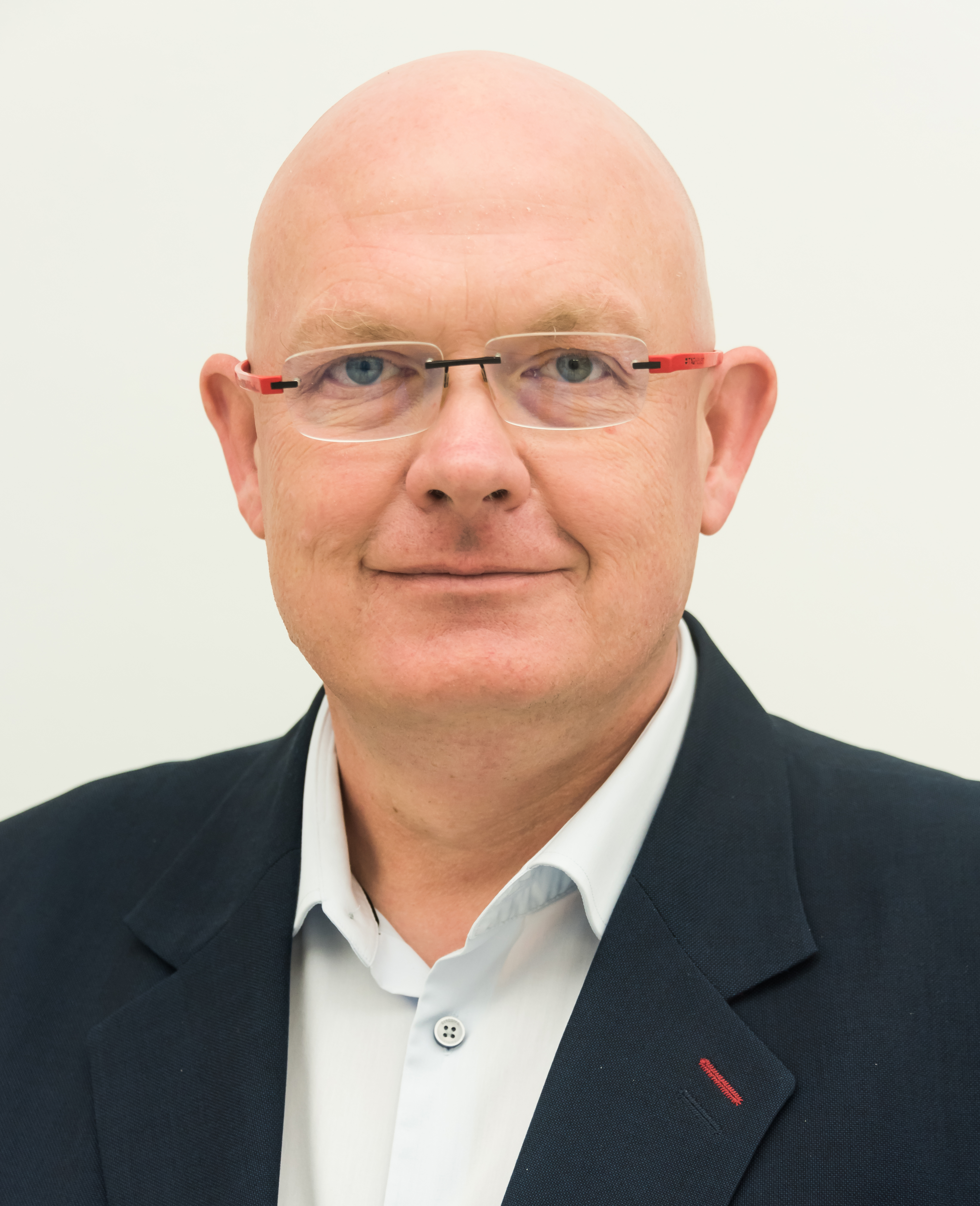
- Gramatyka in 2022

Member of the Sejm
- Incumbent
- Assumed office 12 November 2019
- Constituency: Katowice

Deputy Minister of Digital Affairs
- Incumbent
- Assumed office 23 December 2023

Personal details
- Born: 8 October 1971 (age 54)
- Party: Poland 2050 (since 2021)
- Other political affiliations: Third Way; Civic Platform (until 2021); Freedom Union (formerly)

Michał Sebastian Gramatyka (born 8 October 1971) is a Polish lawyer, musician, and politician of Poland 2050. He has been a member of the Sejm since 2019, and has served as deputy minister of digital affairs since 2023. In the 2024 European Parliament election, he was the lead candidate of the Third Way in Silesia.
