= Michał Kobosko =

Polish politician and journalist

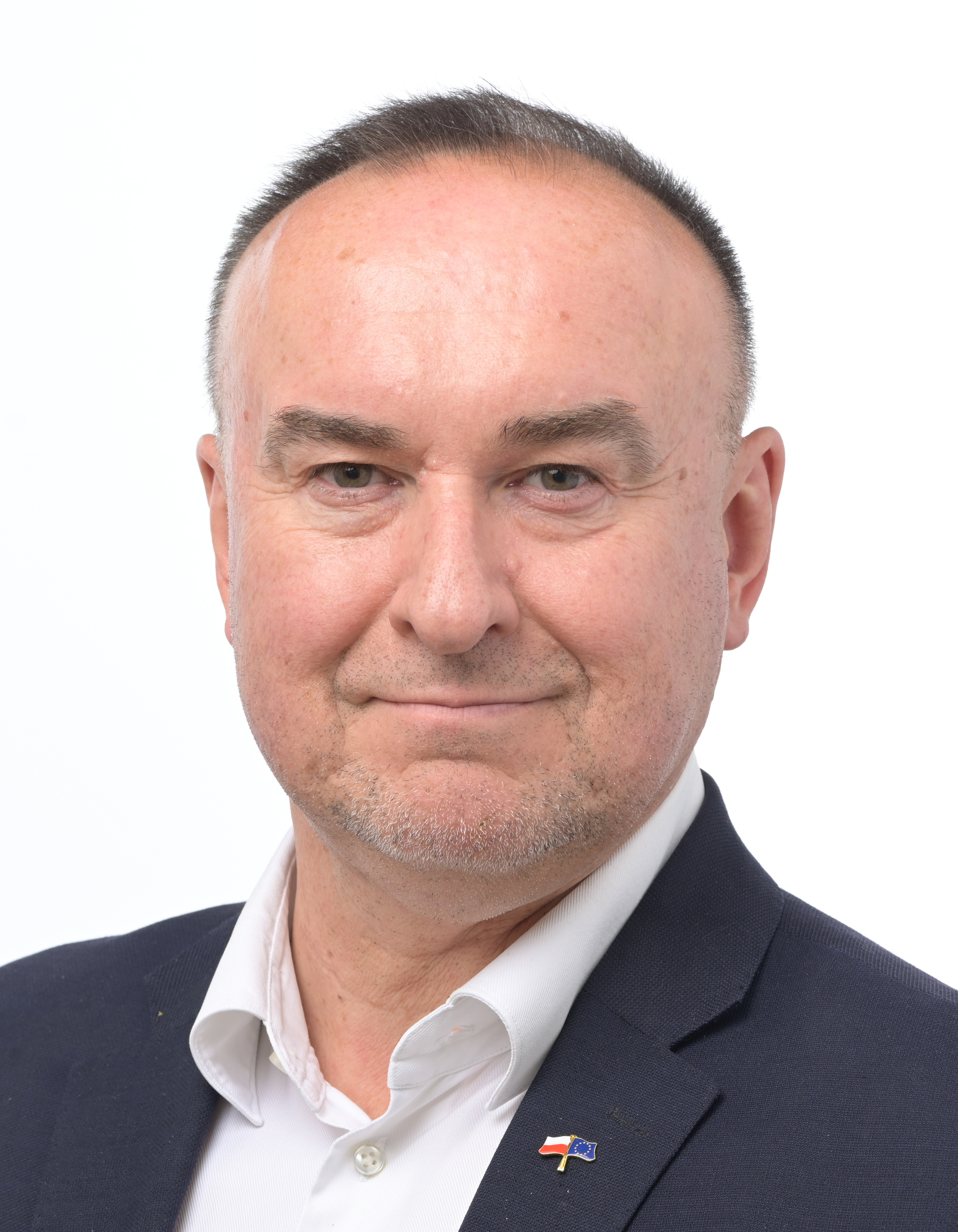

Member of the European Parliament
- Incumbent
- Assumed office 16 July 2024
- Constituency: Warsaw I

Member of the Sejm
- In office 13 November 2023 – 10 June 2024
- Constituency: Warsaw I

Leader of the Poland 2050
- In office 3 November 2020 – 27 March 2022
- Preceded by: office established
- Succeeded by: Szymon Hołownia

Personal details
- Born: Michał Andrzej Kobosko; April 15, 1968 (age 57)
- Party: Independent (after 2026); Poland 2050 (until 2026)
- Occupation: journalist, politician

Michał Andrzej Kobosko (born April 15, 1968) is a Polish journalist and politician.

In the 2023 Polish parliamentary election he was elected to the Sejm for the Third Way in Sejm Constituency no. 19. Elected as a Member of the European Parliament in the 2024 European Parliament election.

== Career ==
He studied at the Warsaw University of Technology. He also studied management and leadership at the SWPS University and the American Studies Center at the University of Warsaw.ed with the biweekly " BusinessWeek " (as deputy editor-in-chief). In 2004, he was employed by the "Profit" monthly by Axel Springer Publishing House. In 2005–2006, the deputy editor-in-chief and editor-in-chief of the monthly "Forbes". In October 2006, he was appointed editor-in-chief of Newsweek Polska (until spring 2009). From April 14, 2007 to March 8, 2008, together with Konrad Piasecki, he was the host of Kontrapunkt RMF FM and Newsweek.

In June 2009, he became the editor-in-chief of the "Dziennik Polska-Europa-Świat" newspaper. From September 14, 2009, when "Gazeta Prawna" and "Dziennik" were merged, he was the editor-in-chief of "Dziennik Gazeta Prawna". In March 2010, he was replaced in this position by Tomasz Wróblewski.

After leaving "Dziennik Gazeta Prawna", he returned to Axel Springer Polska, where he became the publisher of the magazines "Newsweek Polska" and "Forbes". Work for Axel Springer Polska lasted until January 2011. From February 7, 2012 to January 22, 2013 he was the editor-in-chief of the weekly "Wprost", replacing Tomasz Lis in this position. He sat on the jury of the Grand Press competition (since 2000), became a member of the jury of the Lesław A. Paga. In 2013, he ended his activity in the media industry. He became the managing director of Prime Speakers, and then (until 2019) the head of the Polish branch of Atlantic Council.

In 2020, he sat on the staff of Szymon Hołownia in the presidential election and became his electoral representative. He became the vice-president of the Poland 2050 association. In September 2020, he was announced the chairman of the political party founded by Szymon Hołownia (on November 3, an application was submitted for its registration, which took place on March 26, 2021 under the name Poland 2050 by Szymon Hołownia).

In 2026, he left Poland 2050.
