= Paweł Śliz =

Polish politician (born 1980)

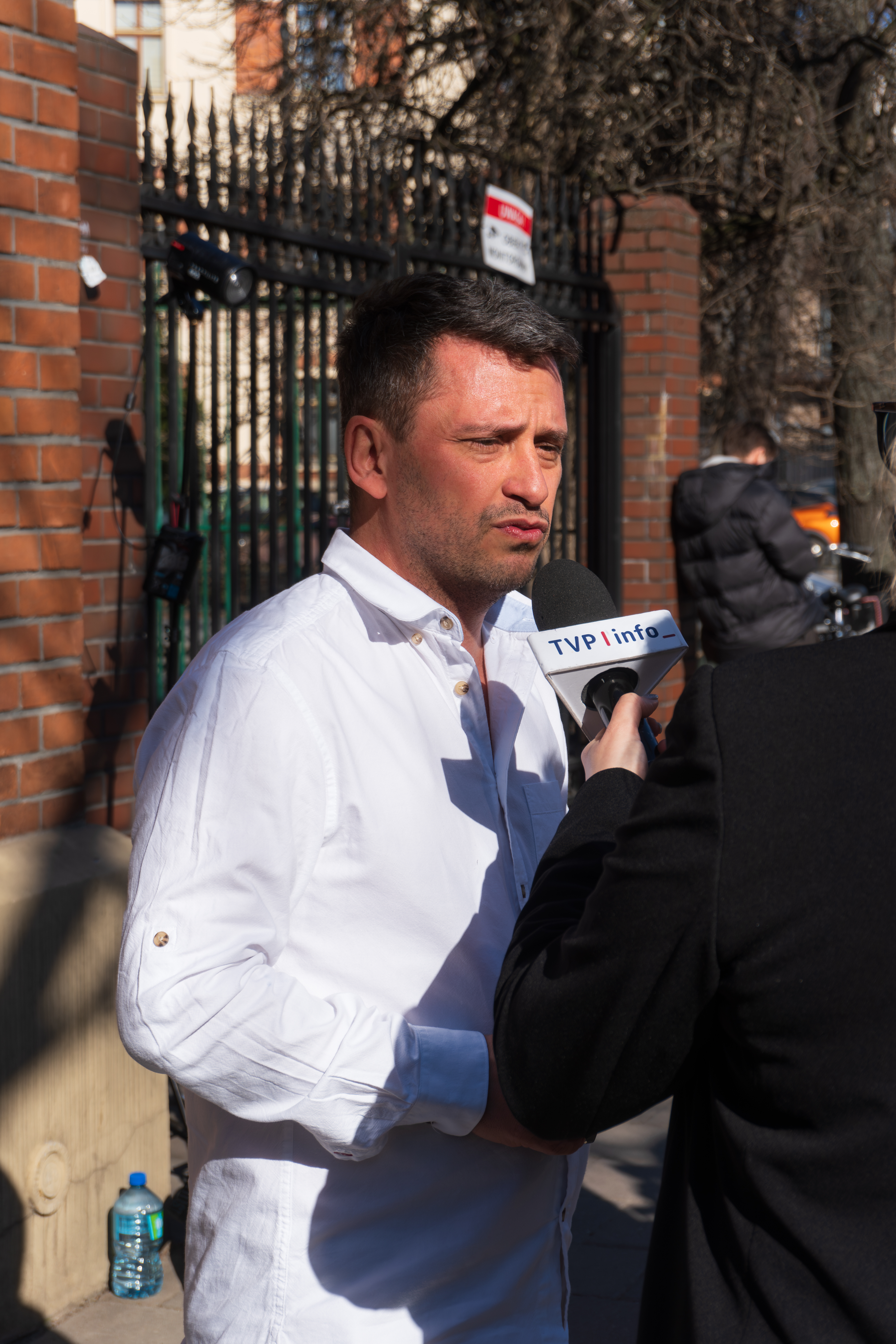
- Śliz in 2026

Member of the Sejm
- Incumbent
- Assumed office 13 November 2023
- Constituency: Kraków

Personal details
- Born: 18 September 1980 (age 45)
- Party: Poland 2050

Paweł Śliz (born 18 September 1980) is a Polish politician serving as a member of the Sejm since 2023. He has served as group leader of Poland 2050 since 2024.
