= Szymon Hołownia =

Polish politician, journalist and writer (born 1976)

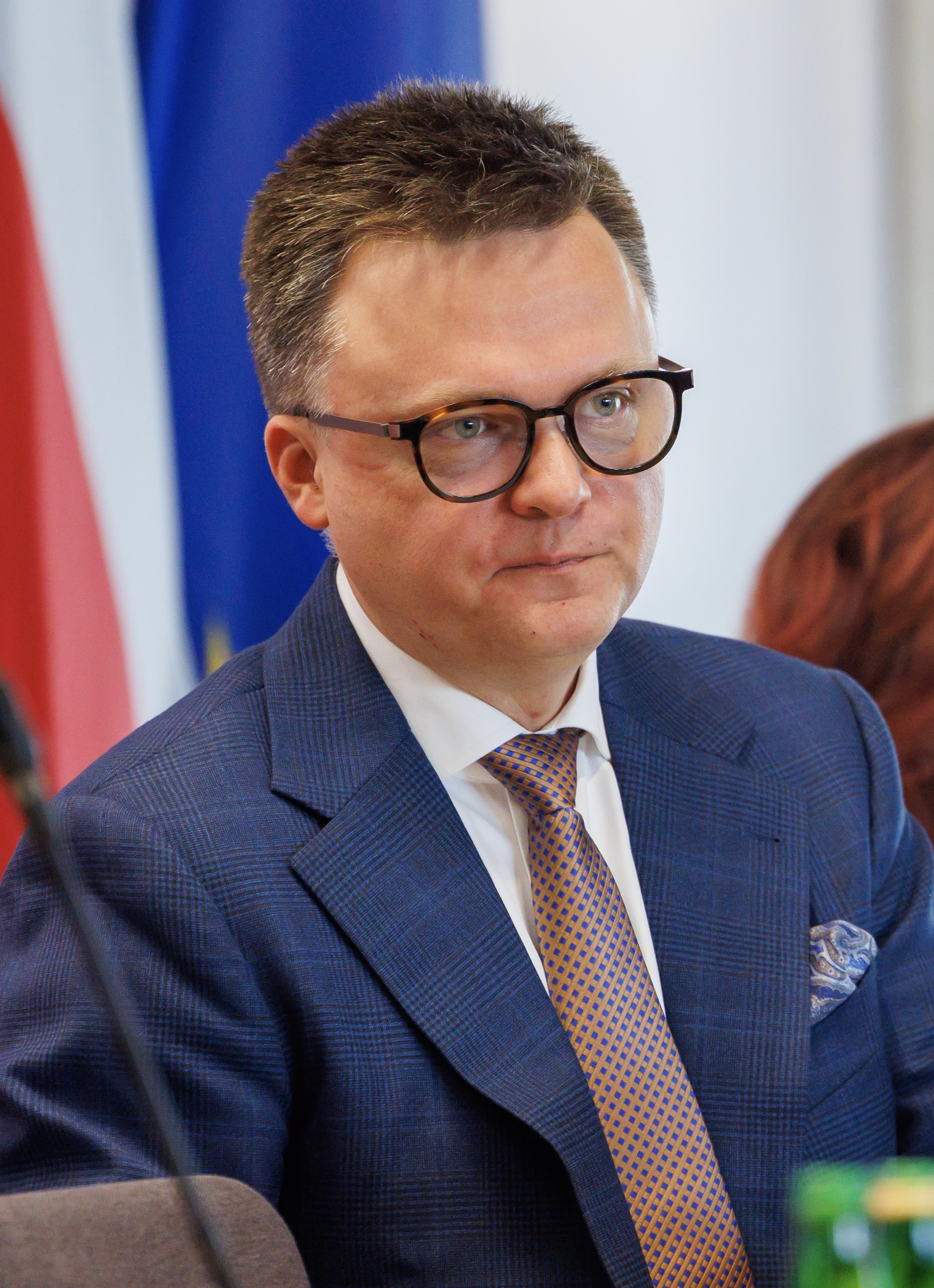
- Hołownia in 2026

Deputy Marshal of the Sejm
- Incumbent
- Assumed office 18 November 2025
- Marshal: Włodzimierz Czarzasty

Marshal of the Sejm
- In office 13 November 2023 – 18 November 2025
- President: Andrzej Duda; Karol Nawrocki
- Preceded by: Elżbieta Witek
- Succeeded by: Włodzimierz Czarzasty

Leader of Poland 2050
- In office 27 March 2022 – 31 January 2026
- Preceded by: Michał Kobosko
- Succeeded by: Katarzyna Pełczyńska-Nałęcz

Member of the Sejm
- Incumbent
- Assumed office 13 November 2023
- Constituency: No. 24 (Białystok)

Personal details
- Born: 3 September 1976 (age 50) Białystok, Poland
- Party: Poland 2050 (since 2020)
- Other political affiliations: Third Way (2023–2025)
- Spouse: Urszula Brzezińska-Hołownia (m. 2016)
- Children: 2

Szymon Franciszek Hołownia (Polish: [ˈʂɨmɔn xɔˈwɔvɲa]; born 3 September 1976) is a Polish politician and television personality who served as Marshal of the Sejm from November 2023 to November 2025. From 2008 to 2019 he co-hosted Mam talent!, the Polish version of Got Talent, together with Marcin Prokop. He is the founder of the Poland 2050 political party and was its leader until 2026. He was a candidate in the 2020 and 2025 Polish presidential elections.

In the 2023 Polish parliamentary election, he was elected to the Sejm from Białystok as a member of Third Way.

== Journalist ==
From 1997 to 2000, he worked as an editor of Gazeta Wyborcza, and from 2001 to 2004 as a columnist and editor of Newsweek Polska. From April to July 2005 he was the deputy editor-in-chief of Ozon magazine. From September 2005 to 2006, he worked for Rzeczpospolita daily as an editor of the Plus Minus appendix. He published – among others – in Kultura Popularna, Machina, Przewodnik Katolicki, Tygodnik Powszechny and Więź. In the years 2006–2012 he was again a columnist for Newsweek Polska. From September 2012 to April 2013 he was a columnist for the Wprost weekly. From 2015 he is a regular columnist for Tygodnik Powszechny.

He hosted programs in Radio Białystok, Radio Vox FM, cooperated with Radio PiN.

He has authored twenty books on social issues and religion.

== Television ==
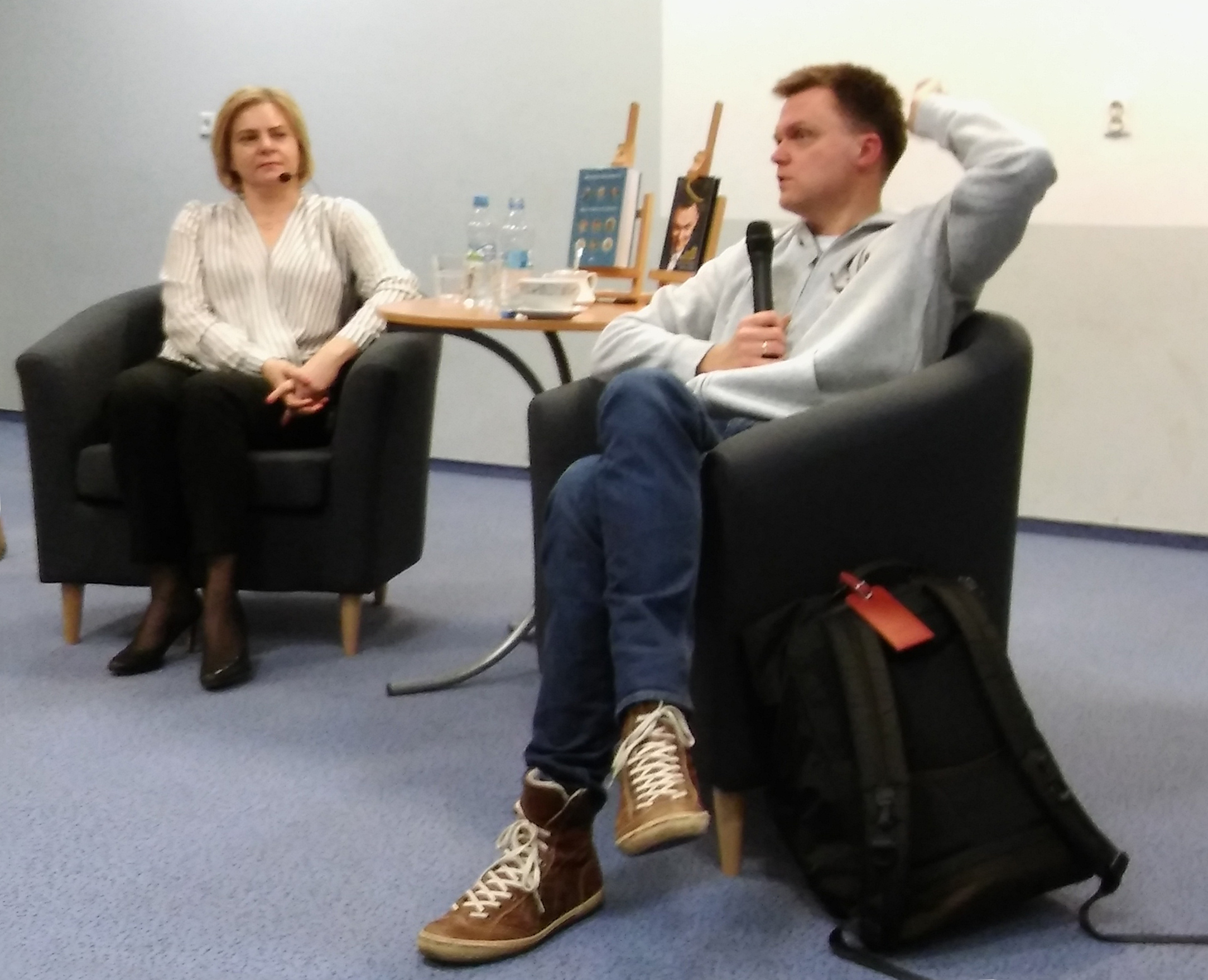
Szymon Hołownia in 2017

Together with Marcin Prokop he co-hosted the Polish edition of Got Talent on TVN (2008–2019). In 2006, he was the host of the program "Po prostu pytam" (pl. "I'm just asking") on TVP1. In the years 2007–2012 he was the program director of Religia.tv. In this station he hosted an ethical talk show "Między sklepami" (pl. "Between Stores") broadcast from the Złote Tarasy shopping mall in Warsaw, the program "Bóg w wielkim mieście" (pl. "God in the Big City") and numerous other programmes.

He was a host of press review in morning show Dzień Dobry TVN.

== Humanitarian work ==
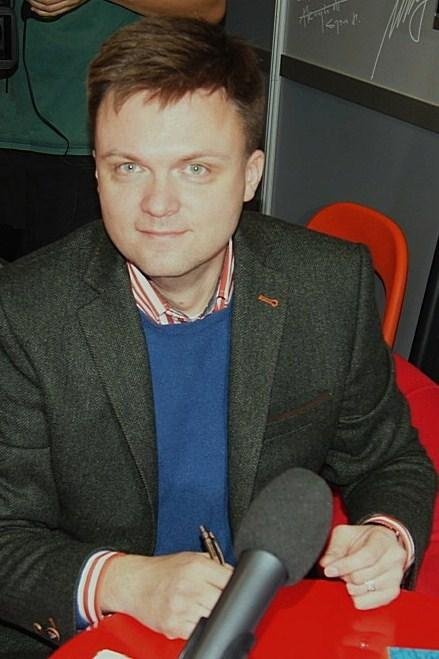
Szymon Hołownia in 2012

He founded the Białystok branch of the "Pomoc Maltańska" foundation. In April 2013, he founded the "Kasisi" foundation, and in the following year he established the "Dobra Fabryka" foundation.

As part of the "Dobra Fabryka", aid organized by Hołownia reached, among others, residents of Bangladesh, Mauritania, Rwanda, Burkina Faso and Senegal. In total, the foundation helps around 40,000 people on a yearly basis. The "Kasisi" foundation focuses on running the largest orphanage in Zambia, where more than two hundred children live permanently.

Hołownia is a children's rights advocate. In 2019, he organized a Facebook fundraiser which raised PLN 2 million (including over PLN 1.5 million paid by Kulczyk Foundation) for the 24-hour telephone helpline for children and youth run by the "Dajemy Dzieciom Siłę" foundation. The support let the line to operate for another year, though it was rejected by the Ministry of National Education. He is a co-initiator of the Pomocni.info website, addressed to people in a difficult life situation.

He was an ambassador of the UN Sustainable Development Goals.

== Political activity ==
Hołownia announced his candidacy for in the 2020 Polish presidential election on 8 December 2019 from the Gdańsk Shakespeare Theatre. On 7 February 2020, he issued a manifesto focused on four aspects: national security, environmental protection, solidarity and activity of the local governments. The chief of his electoral staff was Jacek Cichocki. He was supported, among others, by Janina Ochojska. He based his campaign almost entirely on volunteers operating at the local offices in 16 major Polish cities and on assets from a public fundraiser. Hołownia drummed up 10-20% of support for his candidature.

In 2020 Polish presidential election he received 2,693,397 votes, which was 13.9% of total votes, coming third out of eleven candidates. After the election, he announced the formation of a new political movement called Poland 2050 Movement (Polish: Ruch Polska 2050).

On 13 November 2024 Hołownia announced his start in the 2025 presidential election. He received 4.99% of the votes, coming fifth out of thirteen candidates.

In 2025, he has met with the leader and other MPs of the Law and Justice party, discussing the possibility of vote of no confidence against the Prime Minister Donald Tusk, with Hołownia reportedly being offered the role of prime minister in a potential technical government or an extension of his tenure as a marshal of the Sejm. After the meetings came to light, he said that he regularly meets with the representatives of both the ruling coalition and the opposition.

On 27 September, Hołownia announced that he would step down as party leader of Poland 2050 in January, when the next leadership election would happen, and applied for the role of United Nations High Commissioner for Refugees. His term as Sejm Marshall according to the coalition agreement ended on 13 November. Despite the loss of public trust in the last months of his term as Sejm Marshal, in a SW Research poll for Wprost shortly after his resignation showed that 21.2%, the largest share, of Poles, considered him the best Sejm Marshal, ahead of Elżbieta Witek (11.3%) and Bronisław Komorowski (9.6%). On 31 January 2026, he was succeeded at leading Poland 2050 by Katarzyna Pełczyńska-Nałęcz.

On 20 June 2026, Szymon Hołownia resigned from his position of the party's vice-chairman, although he remains the party's member and vice-marshall of the Sejm. Hołownia then created a group on social media named "Moderates" (Polish: Umiarkowani) and stated that he is considering how and whether to continue his political career.

== Political views ==
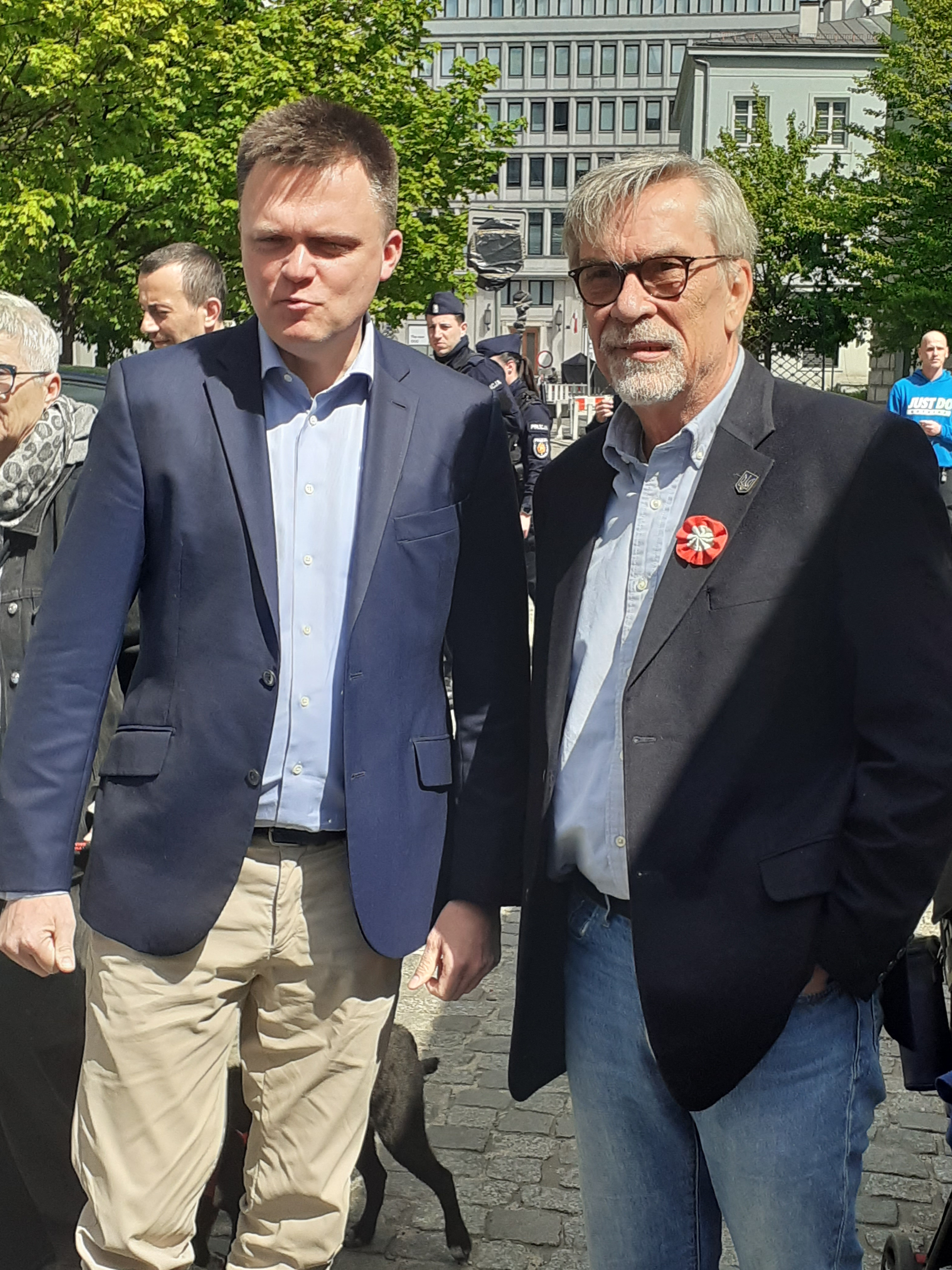
Hołownia and Jacek Żakowski in Warsaw, 2023

Hołownia has expressed support for parliamentary democracy, sovereignty, rule of law, civil society, separation of powers and political pluralism. He emphasizes the importance of Poland's political transformation after 1989, though considers some of its effects to be negative. He emphasizes the role of local governments. He regards the Constitution of Poland as the supreme and indisputable legal act on which the president's conduct is based. He was critical towards the First Cabinet of Mateusz Morawiecki and Second Cabinet of Mateusz Morawiecki. He disapproves of the long-term impacts of the 2015 Polish Constitutional Court crisis and considers changes in the Judiciary of Poland carried out by Law and Justice to be unconstitutional. He does not want to be associated with any political ideology, assuming that agreements and common goals can be found with representatives of all views. He supports Poland's membership in NATO, European Union and Weimar Triangle. He supports Poland's good relations with Ukraine and the Baltic states.

Hołownia has proposed a referendum on increasing the health premium in order to repair health care in Poland. According to Hołownia, Poland should allocate 7% of GDP for this purpose. He points out the need to make the doctors' work lighter and to expand telemedicine services. He has suggested handing over hospitals with their revenues to the Voivodeship governments in order to improve the quality and availability of services, as elected councillors would be responsible for them. He supports expanding public transport connecting rural Poland with voivodeship capitals.

Hołownia supports depoliticization of state companies.

He supports the creation of a National Climate Council to develop a plan for Poland to achieve climate neutrality by 2050 under the European Green Deal, including a move away from coal energy. He considers the water crisis and deforestation for biomass main ecological problems of Poland. He is a supporter of renewable and nuclear energy.

Hołownia supports expanding public housing and lowering bank margins to bring down the cost of living and has stated that he would veto any act establishing housing loan subsidies for banks.

Hołownia supports military spending as a way to increase economic growth, saying that half of the military spending needs to be made in Poland, as opposed to the United States and South Korea.

Hołownia is opposed to gay marriage, preferring the legalization of same-sex civil unions. He has stated that Third Way would follow "a rule of voting according to one's conscience" if such question was brought up.

Hołownia supports a phone ban in primary schools.

== Private life ==
Hołownia is married to Urszula Brzezińska-Hołownia, a Mikoyan MiG-29 jet fighter pilot and a first lieutenant in the Polish Air Force. They have two daughters, Maria and Elżbieta (as of 2022). He graduated from the Social High School in Białystok. He studied psychology at the Warsaw School of Social Psychology but did not complete his degree.

He is a Roman Catholic. Before getting married, Hołownia had been in the Dominican Order twice and was about to take the monastic ordination. In January 2020 he was denied communion by a priest of the Carmelite Church of Warsaw due to his political views; Hołownia denounced the event on Facebook, leading the Archdiocese of Warsaw to issue an official apology, stating that the priest had broken Church regulations.

He is a vegetarian.

== Awards ==
Hołownia has won the Grand Press award twice: 2006 in the Interview category for his conversation with the theologian, Rev. Jerzy Szymik, titled "Heaven for pigeons" and in 2007 in the Specialist Journalism category for an interview with the ethicist and philosopher Dr. Kazimierz Szałata.

In 2004, he was awarded the Business Center Club Press Prize. In 2007, he was awarded the Ślad Award. In 2011, he received the Wiktor award in the Wiktor Audience category for 2010, he was previously nominated for the Wiktor award in 2008 in the category The Greatest Television Discovery. In 2008, he was awarded the MediaTory award by students of journalism from all over Poland in the NawigaTOR category. In 2016, he was awarded the Honorary Medal by the Ombudsman for Children for Merit for the Protection of Children's Rights.

== Electoral history ==
=== Presidential elections ===
Election	Affiliation	First round			Second round		
Election	Affiliation	Votes	Percentage	Position	Votes	Percentage	Position
2020	Independent	2,693,397	13.87%	3rd	Not qualified		
2025	Poland 2050	978,901	4.99%	5th	Not qualified		

== See also ==
- List of Polish politicians
- 2023 Polish parliamentary election

== Notes ==
Party political offices
Preceded by Michał Kobosko	Leader of Poland 2050; 2022–present	Incumbent
Political offices
Preceded by Elżbieta Witek	Marshal of the Sejm; 2023–2025	Succeeded by Włodzimierz Czarzasty
Order of precedence
Preceded by Władysław Kosiniak-Kamysz, Krzysztof Gawkowski as Deputy Presidents of the Council of Ministers	Order of precedence of Poland; Deputy Marshal of the Sejm	Succeeded by Rafał Grupiński, Magdalena Biejat, Maciej Żywno, Michał Kamiński as Deputy Marshal of the Senate of Poland
