= Rafał Kasprzyk =

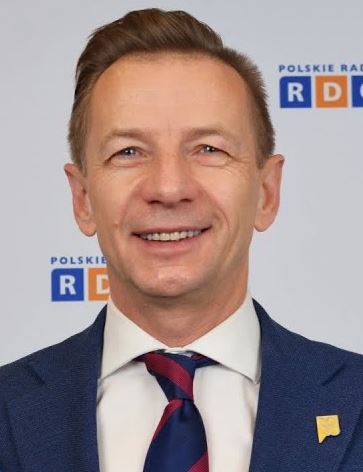
- Kasprzyk in 2024

Member of the Sejm
- Incumbent
- Assumed office 13 November 2023
- Constituency: No. 33 (Kielce)

Personal details
- Born: 27 August 1971 (age 54) Busko-Zdrój, Poland
- Party: Centre (2026-present); Poland 2050 (2023-2026); Modern (previously)
- Other political affiliations: Third Way (until 2025)

Rafał Marcin Kasprzyk (born 27 August 1971 in Busko-Zdrój) is a Polish engineer, manager and politician, a poseł for the 10th term of the Sejm.

== Biography ==
Kasprzyk was born in Busko-Zdrój on 27 August 1971. He graduated the II Liceum in Kielce. In 1996, he earned an engineering degree in general construction at the Kielce University of Technology. In 1997, he graduated the Kraków University of Economics. In 2004, he completed a postgraduate program in Warsaw. He worked as an engineer and a construction manager, for several years working in Spain. He then worked in Poland, holding managerial and directorial positions in construction sector companies (such as Aldesa and Gülermak).

He was an activist of the party Modern. He then joined Poland 2050 of Szymon Hołownia, becoming the leader of the Świętokrzyskie branch. In 2023, he ran for the Sejm from the second place of the Third Way list in Kielce (constituency 33). He was elected to the 10 term Sejm, earning 10,907 votes. He was a member of several parliamentary commissions, such as the commissions for infrastructure, European Union affairs and national defense. He was also a deputy leader of the Public Finances Commission. In 2024, he ran for a seat in the European Parliament in constituency 10, earning 4,056 votes, but not getting elected.

== Electoral history ==
Election	Electoral Committee	Office	District	Result
2023	Third Way	Sejm (10th term)	no. 33	10,907 (1.65%) ✓
2024	Third Way	European Parliament (10th term)	no. 10	4,056 (0.27%) ✗
