= Katarzyna Pełczyńska-Nałęcz =

Polish sociologist and ambassador

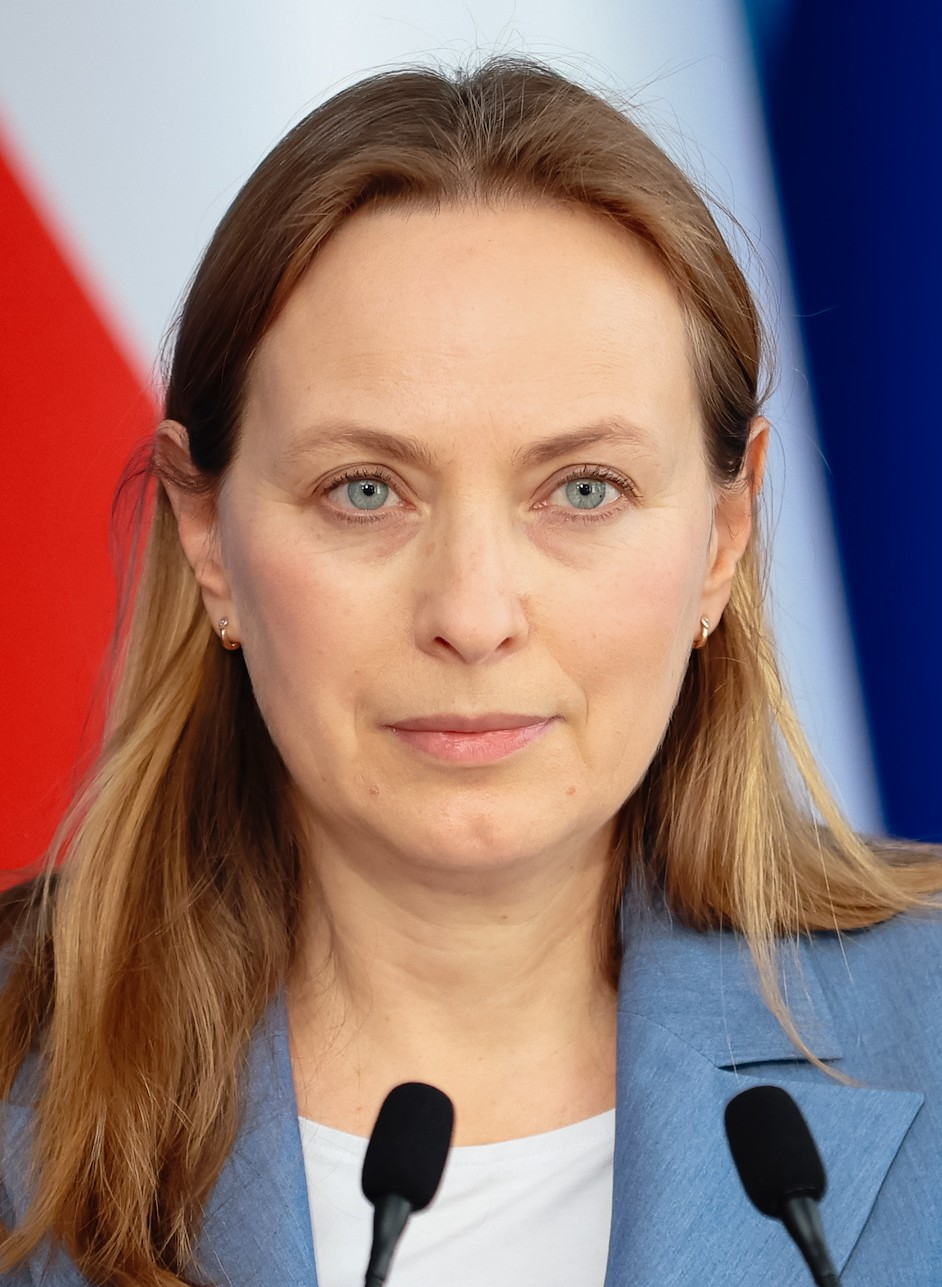
- Pełczyńska-Nałęcz in 2024

Minister of Funds and Regional Policy
- In office 13 December 2023 – 22 October 2026
- Prime Minister: Donald Tusk
- Preceded by: Małgorzata Jarosińska-Jedynak

Leader of Poland 2050
- In office 31 January 2026 – 24 October 2026
- Preceded by: Szymon Hołownia

Poland Ambassador to Russia
- In office 19 November 2014 – 31 July 2016
- President: Bronisław Komorowski; Andrzej Duda
- Preceded by: Wojciech Zajączkowski
- Succeeded by: Włodzimierz Marciniak

Personal details
- Born: October 26, 1970 (age 55) Warsaw, Poland
- Party: Independent (since 2026)
- Other political affiliations: Poland 2050 (2020-2026)
- Children: 3
- Education: University of Warsaw; Polish Academy of Sciences
- Occupation: Diplomat • Politician

Katarzyna Pełczyńska-Nałęcz (born October 26, 1970) is a Polish sociologist and the leader of Poland 2050 until her resignation in October 2026. She was formerly the Ambassador of Poland to Russia from 2014 to 2016 and later the Minister of Development Funds and Regional Policy from 2023 to 2026. She became the first woman ambassador of Poland in Moscow since the establishment of Polish–Russian relations, between the Kingdom of Poland and the Grand Duchy of Moscow in the 16th century. Pełczyńska-Nałęcz previously served as Undersecretary of State at the Polish Foreign Ministry from 2012 to 2014.

== Biography ==
Pełczyńska-Nałęcz graduated from the Institute of Sociology of Warsaw University in 1994. Then she worked at the Institute of Philosophy and Sociology of the Polish Academy of Sciences where in 1999 she defended her Ph.D. Later she became the deputy director at the Center for Eastern Studies and the head of its Russian Department.

=== Political career ===
In 2012 she was appointed as Undersecretary of State at the Polish Foreign Ministry, serving two years until being appointed as the Ambassador of Poland to Russia in 2014. During an interview with a Russian news agency, Pełczyńska-Nałęcz said the return of the wreck of the Polish presidential plane which crashed in 2010 would be "of symbolic significance for Poland". She was dismissed from her position as Ambassador of Poland to the Russian Federation by President Andrzej Duda in 2016.

In 2020 she joined Szymon Hołownia's Poland 2050, becoming the head of the party's think-tank "Strategy 2050" (Polish: Strategia 2050). Despite heading the party's campaign in the 2023 Polish parliamentary election, she herself refused to seek a mandate in the Sejm. In December of 2023, following a victory of the opposition in the parliamentary elections, Pełczyńska-Nałęcz became the Minister of Development Funds and Regional Policy.

==== Party leadership ====
In 2025, following Poland 2050's decline in the aftermath of the presidential election and the subsequent resignation of Hołownia from party leadership, Pełczyńska-Nałęcz entered the party's leadership election, focusing her campaign on distancing the party from other members of the governing coalition in the aim to run independently for 2027. Despite internal polarization, on 31 January 2026 she would secure a narrow victory against Paulina Hennig-Kloska, whom would later split-off to from the Centre Union. During her tenure, she was accused by pro-government politicians of trying to forge an alliance with the opposition, notably the left-wing Together Party, and the right-wing Development Plus.

Her leadership would last until 24 October 2026, (Note: Pełczyńska-Nałęcz announced her resignation on 22 October 2026, without submitting a formal resignation notice to the Poland 2050's National Board. Two days later on 24 October 2026, the National Board voted to remove her from the party altogether.) resigning in the aftermath of numerous struggles between her, and rest of the governing coalition. She would also subsequently resign her post in the Ministry of Development Funds and Regional Policy on 22 October 2026, citing personal integrity and values.

== Election history ==
Despite her political activity, as of 2026 she has not participated in a national or local election.

| Year | Office | Party | Primary | | | Secondary | | | Result | Ref. |
| Year | Office | Party | Total | % | P. | Total | % | P. | Result | Ref. |
|---|---|---|---|---|---|---|---|---|---|---|
| 2026 | Party; Chairmanship | Poland 2050 | 277 | 42.23% | 1st | 350 | 53.27% | 1st | Won | |

== Personal life ==
Pełczyńska-Nałęcz speaks English and Russian. She is married and has three children.
