= Sławomir Ćwik =

Polish economist

Sławomir Ćwik (born January 21, 1972, in Zamość) is a Polish economist, lawyer, politician and member of the tenth term of the Sejm of the Republic of Poland.

== Career ==
Sławomir Ćwik holds a degree from the Faculty of Law and Administration at Maria Curie-Skłodowska University in Lublin. He continued his education with postgraduate studies in taxation at the Warsaw School of Economics (Szkoła Główna Handlowa w Warszawie). His professional experience includes work as a lawyer and manager within commercial law firms. Additionally, he has entrepreneurial experience having founded a business in the renewable energy sector.

He was active in the Nowoczesna party. In 2015, he ran for the Sejm at the party's recommendation. He then went on to run for the European Parliament in 2019. During the 2018 local elections, he was elected councilor of Zamość. In those same elections, he also ran for mayor of the city, but was unsuccessful, placing third with 17.82% of the votes.
