= Wprost =

Polish weekly news magazine

- Wprost cover from 22 May 2005
- Editor: Natalia Rzewińska; Szymon Krawiec
- Categories: News magazine
- Frequency: Weekly
- Circulation: 84,401 (October 2016)
- Publisher: AWR "WPROST"
- First issue: 1982; 44 years ago
- Country: Poland
- Based in: Poznań
- Language: Polish
- Website: www.wprost.pl
- ISSN: 0209-1747
- OCLC: 24423346

Wprost (Polish pronunciation: [ˈfprɔst], meaning "Directly") is a Polish weekly news magazine published in Poznań, Poland. It has been published since 1982. Since 2020 it has been available in a digital version only.

== Political alignment ==
The magazine's political alignment is usually considered to be moderately right-wing, however many intellectuals associated with the left have also published articles in the magazine. Wprost has described itself as a centrist magazine.

== History ==
The first issue of Wprost was released on 5 December 1982, as a regional magazine in Greater Poland whereas since 1989 it has transformed into a nationwide magazine. The weekly provides social and political commentary and is based in Poznań. It was designed based on the formats of Time and Newsweek magazines.

At the beginning of the 2000s the publisher was Agencja Wydawniczo-Reklamowa Wprost. It has been published by Platforma Mediowa Point Group since 2010.

In 2012, according to the Institute of Media Monitoring (IMM), the magazine was the most cited weekly by other media outlets in Poland as well as among the most cited of all media published in the country.

On 30 March 2020, the last printed edition of the magazine was published and currently it is only available in digital form.

Wprost had a circulation of 218,000 copies in 2001–02. The circulation of the magazine was 102,987 in 2010 and 115,645 copies in 2011. The print and e-edition circulation of the weekly was 130,136 in August 2014.

== Major supplements and activities ==
Since 1990, the magazine has been publishing its annual list of the richest people in Poland and since 1991 it has been awarding the Wprost Magazine Person of the Year title.

Each month the weekly provides an English-language supplement, WiK English Edition, which focuses on concerts, exhibitions, and interesting weekend getaways, and an in-depth guide to Warsaw's dining and nightlife.

Under auspices of the weekly, the jury composed of winners of previous editions grants annual Kisiel Prizes. Wprost weekly itself has granted Man of the Year awards. The magazine has published numerous periodical rankings, such as “Top 100 Richest Poles”, “Top 100 Most Influential Poles”, the list of top innovative companies.

== Controversies ==
=== Role in the 2014 government bugging scandal ===
In June 2014, Wprost published a series of transcripts of secret recordings involving senior Polish government officials which were believed to have been made in one or more restaurants in the capital, Warsaw, and thought to date back as far as Summer 2013. These included one in which Radoslaw Sikorski, Polish minister of foreign affairs, was recorded in a conversation with the former Polish finance minister Jacek Rostowski using very derogatory terms to criticise British Prime Minister David Cameron and Cameron's handling of the EU to appease Eurosceptics. In another transcript the country's Central Bank governor, Marek Belka, discussed the forthcoming 2015 election with the interior minister. Sikorski did not deny the remarks attributed to him by Wprost, and Belka said he would not resign over the remarks he is alleged to have made. The publication of the secret recordings led to calls for the resignation of Polish Prime Minister Donald Tusk and the launching of an inquiry into how Wprost had obtained them. The magazine's chief editor, Sylwester Latkowski, was questioned as a witness in the inquiry after he resisted attempts to search the magazine's office and computers.

== Editors-in-chief ==
The first editor-in-chief of the magazine was Janusz Przybysz who served in the post between 1982 and 1983. Then Waldemar Kosiński was the editor-in-chief and his term ended in 1989. The longest working editor-in-chief was Marek Król (1989–2006) and until December 2006 he acted also as the president and majority shareholder in Wprost magazine. Between May 2006 and January 2007 duties of the editor-in-chief were fulfilled by Piotr Gabryel. Upon his resignation in 2007, the position was taken by Stanisław Janecki. After acquisition of 80% of shares in Agencja Wydawniczo-Reklamowa “Wprost” by Platforma Mediowa Point Group at the end of 2009, Janecki left the magazine and Katarzyna Kozłowska became the acting editor-in-chief. Tomasz Lis was in charge of the magazine between May 2010 and 2012. Michał Kobosko was appointed editor-in-chief in February 2012 and served in the post until 2013.

=== List ===
- Janusz Przybysz (1982–1983)
- Waldemar Kosiński (1983–1989)
- Marek Król (1989–2006)
- Piotr Gabryel (2006–2007)
- Stanisław Janecki (2007–2010)
- Katarzyna Kozłowska (2010, acting)
- Tomasz Lis (2010–2012)
- Michał Kobosko (2012–2013)
- Sylwester Latkowski (2013–2015)
- Tomasz Wróblewski (2015–2016)
- Jacek Pochłopień (2016–2019)
- Marcin Dzierżanowski (2019–2020)
- Robert Feluś (2021)
- Szymon Krawiec and Natalia Rzewińska (2022)

== See also ==
- List of magazines in Poland
