= Poland 2050 =

Political party in Poland

Poland 2050 Polska 2050 Rzeczypospolitej Polskiej
- Abbreviation: PL2050
- Chairman: Vacant
- Vice-Chairman: Ewa Schädler; Adam Rudawski
- Founder: Szymon Hołownia
- Founded: 30 June 2020
- Registered: 7 April 2021
- Headquarters: ul. Warecka 8/67, 00-049 Warsaw
- Think tank: Strategy Institute 2050
- Youth wing: Generation 2050
- Membership (2025): ~1,500
- Ideology: Christian democracy; Liberal conservatism; Social conservatism
- Political position: Centre to centre-right
- National affiliation: Third Way (2023–2025); Senate Pact 2023 (for 2023 Senate election)
- European Parliament group: Renew Europe (2024–2026)
- Colours: Yellow; Grey
- Sejm: 15 / 460 (3%)
- Senate: 1 / 100 (1%)
- European Parliament: 0 / 53 (0%)
- Regional assemblies: 22 / 552 (4%)
- City presidents: 1 / 107 (0.9%)
- Voivodes: 2 / 16 (13%)
- Voivodeship Marshals: 0 / 16 (0%)

Website
- polska2050.pl

Poland 2050 (Note: Poland 2050's full name is Poland 2050 of the Republic of Poland (Polish: Polska 2050 Rzeczypospolitej Polskiej)) (Polish: Polska 2050, PL2050) is a political party in Poland. It was founded as a social movement in 2020, shortly after that year's presidential election, and was officially registered as a political party in April 2021. In the years prior to the 2023 Polish parliamentary election, eight MPs defected to Poland 2050 in the Sejm. After its first national electoral test, the party finished in third place. Poland 2050 joined a ruling coalition, with its leader Szymon Hołownia being chosen as Marshal of the Sejm. Described as centrist to centre-right, it is ideologically Christian democratic, liberal-conservative and socially conservative.

== History ==
=== Founding ===
Party logo before 2023

The first indication that Szymon Hołownia planned to establish a social movement appeared in February 2020, when he led a campaign for the 2020 presidential election. Hołownia officially announced the formation of a new movement on 30 June 2020, two days after the first round of elections, in which he was placed 3rd with a result of less than 14% of votes. The organisation was registered on 24 August 2020, and five days later it was officially introduced. According to Szymon Hołownia, 20,000 people joined the movement.

On 29 September 2020, Szymon Hołownia announced the creation of a political party associated with the movement, led by Michał Kobosko, whose registration (under the name "Poland 2050 by Szymon Hołownia") was filed with the District Court in Warsaw on 3 November 2020.

In November 2020, the party gained its first MP in the Sejm: Hanna Gill-Piątek from the Spring party. By the end of the year, the party got between 10 and 20 percent in opinion polls, which made it the third most popular party in Poland. By the end of the year, Gill-Piątek and Jacek Kozlowski became the party's Deputy Chair.

On 8 January 2021, the party gained another representative in the Sejm (Joanna Mucha) and its first Senator (Jacek Bury). Both these members initially were members of Civic Platform, which was the main party of the Civic Coalition. On the same day, members of the Elk City Council and the Elk Poviat Council, including its chair Andrzej Wiszowaty, who were members of the local party Dobro Wspólne created the Poland 2020 Local Councillors club.

In February 2021, yet another member of the Civic Coalition (Paulina Hennig-Kloska of the Modern party) joined ranks of Poland 2050 in the Sejm. This allowed the movement to create its own Sejm circle. In March, another MP joined the party, the Independent politician and famous journalist Tomasz Zimoch.

On 7 April 2021, Szymon Hołownia's Poland 2050 officially registered as a political party. Thirteen days later another member of Modern, Mirosław Suchoń, joined Poland 2050. On 20 May 2021, a former member of the government and Agreement, Wojciech Maksymowicz, joined the party and its group in Sejm, after he was accused by the government media of performing medical research using aborted fetuses. On 28 October 2021 Paweł Zalewski, an MP expelled from Civic Platform due to his conservative stances joined PL2050.

Poland 2050, through MEP Róża Thun, officially joined the Renew Europe group in the European Parliament on 10 November 2021.

=== First elections (2023–2025) ===
Opinion polling of Poland 2050 and the Third Way in Polish parliamentary elections. Vertical lines left to right: performance of party in 2020, 2023, 2024 (local), 2024 (European Parliament), 2025.

Poland 2050 contested the 2023 parliamentary election on 15 October 2023 with the Polish People's Party and other small parties (Agreement, Centre for Poland, Union of European Democrats) in the Third Way (Polish: Trzecia Droga, TD) alliance, where the alliance overperformed polls, earning 14.4% of the vote, 7.2% of which for PL2050. PL2050, as well as PSL, joined a coalition with the Civic Coalition and New Left, creating the Third Cabinet of Donald Tusk, with Hołownia elected as Marshal of the Sejm. The alliance then performed in the April 2024 local elections, earning 14.3% of the vote, but only increasing its vote share by 2.2 pp relative to the 2018 local elections, where the PSL already gained 12.1% by itself. In June, the alliance suffered a defeat in the 2024 European Parliament election, gaining only 6.9% of the vote, well below polling predictions and only about half the result of the Confederation, despite polls having shown the two in close competition.

After the election in late 2023, the Third Way alliance consistently gained around 15% in opinion polls. However, its polling numbers began declining, with them only getting around 10% in 2024 and by 2025, in some polls it even failed to cross the 8% election threshold for coalitions. Hołownia was declared the TD's candidate for the 2025 presidential election, announcing his candidacy on 13 November 2024, and getting endorsed by the Polish People's Party on 14 December. A small party in the alliance, the Union of European Democrats, would endorse Rafał Trzaskowski of the Civic Coalition over Hołownia.

=== Crisis and decline (2025–2026) ===
==== Last months of Hołownia ====
In the run-up to the presidential election, the Polish People's Party began distancing itself from PL2050. Ultimately, the party was severely weakened after Hołownia gained only 4.99% of the vote, greatly underperforming expectations. The Third Way alliance broke apart two weeks later on 17 June.

Following the election, election denialists, including Prime Minister Donald Tusk attempted to have Szymon Hołownia block or postpone the inauguration of Karol Nawrocki as president of Poland by calling an indefinite break during the National Assembly (the joint session of the Sejm and Senat), during Nawrocki's inauguration, after which the Marshal of the Sejm would serve as acting president. Following Hołownia's refusal of the idea, pro-government outlets like Gazeta Wyborcza accused Hołownia of treason against the Constitution.

Hołownia was further criticized by his coalition partners after a meeting with opposition leaders in Adam Bielan's house on 4 July, being accused of plotting the downfall of the coalition. Polls indicated that 66% of Poles saw the meeting negatively, and 61% believed Hołownia was considering a coalition with Law and Justice, 76% thought Hołownia's party would collapse, and that Hołownia himself reached 80% disapproval, with even 70% of supporters of his own party disapproving of him.

Hołownia's position within the party weakened, with some party members losing confidence in him, and posełs Tomasz Zimoch and Izabela Bodnar, as well as regional leader Jacek Bury, left the party. According to RMF FM, several Poland 2050 posełs began procedures to change their party affiliation to PL2050's former partner, the Polish People's Party in October 2025. On 27 September, Hołownia announced his retirement from politics and that he would step down as party leader in January. Since September 2025, the party has increasingly clashed with the governing coalition.

On 30 September, the party endorsed Katarzyna Pełczyńska-Nałęcz to enter the Third Cabinet of Donald Tusk as a Deputy Prime Minister. This was controversial in the party, with many party members preferring her internal rival, Paulina Hennig-Kloska. Regardless, Pełczyńska Nałęcz narrowly won both the votes in the party's parliamentary club (getting 16 votes to 14 for Hennig-Kloska (Note: According to the Polish Press Agency, Żaneta Cwalina-Śliwowska also gained one vote.)) and the National Council (22 to 19). The vote solidified the split between factions supportive of cooperation with Tusk (including Hennig-Kloska) and those seeking a confrontation with the Prime Minister (with Pełczyńska-Nałęcz). The recommendation was also not within the coalition agreement signed by PL2050 and its allies, and Hołownia presented it as a condition for his agreed upon stepping down as "Sejm Marshal in rotation" for succession by Włodzimierz Czarzasty of the New Left. In a November 2025 SW Research poll, a plurality (35.5%) of respondents did not want Poland 2050 to have a deputy Prime Minister, whereas 23.6% believed the party should have one in the government.

Hołownia was replaced by Czarzasty as Marshal of the Sejm on 18 November 2025, with Hołownia becoming a deputy Marshal.

==== Leadership election ====
On 27 September 2025, Hołownia announced that he would step down as party leader in January 2026, when the next leadership election would happen, and applied for the role of United Nations High Commissioner for Refugees. An SW Research poll showed that 45.3% of Poles were against Hołownia's efforts for the UN position, while 17.6% were in favor. According to Pełczyńska-Nałęcz, the party will remove the "Szymon Hołownia's" suffix from the party name after a change in the leadership. After a controversial and polarizing election period, Katarzyna Pełczyńska-Nałęcz narrowly defeated Paulina Hennig-Kloska for the position, earning 53% of the vote.

On 3 February, Pełczyńska-Nałęcz appointed Ewa Schädler and Adam Rudawski as the party's vice-chairs, Łukasz Osmalak as treasurer and Robert Sitnik as general secretary. Afterwards, Hennig-Kloska, Kasprzyk, Ćwik and Hołownia were elected by the party as the other vice-chairs of the party to sit on the National Board. Pełczyńska-Nałęcz declared that the party would be heading to present itself as a "party of clear centrism" and as a "middle class party". TOK FM speculated that Pełczyńska-Nałęcz could try to shift the party to forge an electoral alliance with the left-wing Razem for the upcoming parliamentary election.

==== Under Pełczyńska-Nałęcz (2026) ====
Pełczyńska-Nałęcz's assumption of the party leadership did not stop the crisis within the party. On 11 February, 18 of the party's 31 posełs signed onto a demand for structural changes within the parliamentary club. The Polish Press Agency reported several posełs were ready to leave the parliamentary club altogether, listing Paweł Zalewski, Ryszard Petru, Joanna Mucha, Aleksandra Leo and Ewa Szymanowska.

Under her tenure, the party formally fractured: MP Żaneta Cwalina-Śliwowska on 14 February, MEP Michał Kobosko on 16 February, MP Paweł Zalewski on 17 February, MP Joanna Mucha and Senator Mirosław Różański on 18 February. On 18 February, a group of 15 MPs (Note: This group included Żaneta Cwalina-Śliwowska, who was independent but until this point declared she would stay in Poland 2050's parliamentary club, as well as Izabela Bodnar, a former MP of the party who left in mid-2025.) and 3 Senators headed by Paulina Hennig-Kloska, Pełczyńska-Nałęcz's election opponent, announced the creation of a new parliamentary group — "Centre".

On 21 March 2026, the party changed its full name from "Szymon Hołownia's Poland 2050" (Polish: Polska 2050 Szymona Hołowni) to "Poland 2050 of the Republic of Poland" (Polish: Polska 2050 Rzeczypospolitej Polskiej). On 20 June 2026, Szymon Hołownia resigned from his position of the party's vice-chairman, although he remains the party's member and vice-marshall of the Sejm. Hołownia then created a group on social media named "Moderates" (Polish: Umiarkowani) and stated that he is considering how and whether to continue his political career.

Under Pełczyńska-Nałęcz, attempts at finding a suitable coalition partner for the next election were made, considering the party's overall low polling numbers. Most notable examples came from a proposed "housing coalition" (Polish: koalicja mieszkaniowa) with the left-wing Together Party. While Pełczyńska-Nałęcz dismissed rumors of a pact, she has refrained from making any definitive commitments. During her tenure she was also accused of attempting to forge a possible coalition with Morawiecki's Rozwój Plus, which she firmly denied.

==== Resignation and new leadership ====
On 22 October 2026, the majority of Poland 2050's MPs voted in favor of a Polish People's Party proposal that aimed to abolish the two-term limits for local government officeholders. This was in spite of Pełczyńska-Nałęcz whom earlier called on the party to reject this bill. The proposal was ultimately rejected by the rest of the Sejm. On the same day, Pełczyńska-Nałęcz would declare her resignation both from the government of Donald Tusk, and Poland 2050's leadership, citing personal values and integrity. There have been speculations that the decision to leave the government and the party by Pełczyńska-Nałęcz have been in the making for weeks prior to resigning due to internal conflicts between her and the rest of the coalition, with some party politicians accusing her of planning to split off from the coalition and working with the opposition Together Party.

Following the resignation, founder and MP Szymon Hołownia announced during a parliamentary press conference that the party plans to elect a new leader. He also stated that he was willing to restore relations with the Centre Union, whose politicians split off after Pełczyńska's election. While Hołownia stated that the parliamentary club of the party will remain inside the governing coalition, he accused the prime minister Donald Tusk of not coordinating with the party in the renomination of a new minister of Development Funds and Regional Policy, a position previously held by the outgoing party leader Pełczyńska-Nałęcz. Pełczyńska-Nałęcz was removed from the party by its executive board on 24 October 2026.

On 14 November 2026, the party via its social media channels communicated that it plans to hold a new leadership election on December 2nd. Former leader of the party's parliamentary club Paweł Śliz announced his candidacy on November 19. Current co-leader of the party's National Board Ewa Schädler is rumored to be a possible candidate, though she has yet to announce her intentions. Former party leader Szymon Hołownia announced that he will neither enter the leadership race nor run in the next parliamentary election.

== Ideology and position ==
Upon its foundation, the party was described by various sources to be positioned in the centre, or the centre-right, of the political spectrum. Its policies spanned from the centre-left to the centre-right. It was also seen as a catch-all party. However, by 2025, the party is consistently placed in the centre-right. The party also adheres to economic liberalism "in continuity with the reforms of Balcerowicz". Party's founder, Szymon Hołownia, has been described as "rather socially conservative and economically liberal."

PL2050 was seen to pursue green policies whilst combining elements of Christian democracy, liberalism, and social democracy. However, after 2023 the party distanced itself from environmentalist causes and dropped its key green postulates. The party has also been also described as conservative, moderate-conservative, and neo-Christian democratic. It supports Poland's membership in the European Union.

=== Environmental policies ===
It believes that by 2050 at the latest, Poland should achieve carbon neutrality. They have also stated support for the European Green Deal. Hołownia announced during the presidential campaign in 2020 that "miners should be protected, and not the mines". He declared that his presidency "will be the green presidency" and that "the natural environment is one of the priorities". In 2021, the party was seen as green conservative.

In March 2021, the "Poland on the Green Trail" program was presented. Its main objectives are to reduce greenhouse gas emissions by 45% by 2030, move away from coal by 2040 and achieve carbon neutrality in 2050. It has also proposed that the minister responsible for energy transformation should have the rank of deputy prime minister and head the Committee of the Council of Ministers for decarbonization of the economy. A "green light" procedure would be introduced into the government's legislative process, which would block laws that increase emissions and have a negative impact on the climate.

While described as environmentalist in 2023, the party greatly toned down its rhetoric and proposals once coming to power. The party distanced itself from the European Green Deal, stating that it is unacceptable in its current form. It also dropped its proposal to introduce taxation on combustion cars. Political commentators noted that the pressure created by the 2024 Polish farmers' protests as well as the conservatism of Polish People's Party contributed towards the decision of Poland 2050 to distance itself from environmentalist causes. Clean Energy Wire wrote that "the shift of the Poland 2050 party, which started off with a progressive climate strategy... is particularly remarkable" and that "the rhetoric of the party’s leader Szymon Hołownia is striking in this regard, as it is highly reminiscent of far-right populists".

=== Domestic policies ===
The party aims for the Senate to become a "self-government chamber" in which, apart from elected senators, representatives of local governments at various levels would be represented: voivodeship marshals, city presidents, village heads and mayors. It is also against the centralization of Poland. Hołownia announced that he would act for the independence of judges and the independence of courts and the separation of the functions of the minister of justice and prosecutor general. The movement calls for a relief for judges and the creation of "courts of first contact". Hołownia supports the liquidation of the Church Fund. The party supports a return to the 'abortion compromise' from 1993, which criminalizes abortion except for cases of rape, danger to mother's health or serious fetal defects.

=== Foreign policy ===
It supports the European Union, and strengthening relations with France and Germany. Hołownia stated that "Poland should not look for enemies in foreign policy, but allies". It sees the EU as the guarantor of Poland's economic development, and also supports NATO as necessary to Poland's security. Regarding NATO, the party declared that Poland “is not only in the NATO pact, but is the Pact”, arguing that Poland is not just a NATO member but also a part of the Western identity. It considers Russian Federation an existential threat to the 'West', claiming that the Russo-Ukrainian War is "a war that Putin declared against the entire West, of which Ukraine was starting to be a part not institutionally, but culturally and civilizationally".

== Structure ==
As of February 2026, the party's National Board is as follows:

=== Party leaders ===
No.	Image	Chairman	Tenure
1		Michał Kobosko	3 November 2020 – 27 March 2022
2		Szymon Hołownia	27 March 2022 – 31 January 2026
3		Katarzyna Pełczyńska-Nałęcz	31 January 2026 – 24 October 2026
		Vacant (Note: Pełczyńska-Nałęcz resigned from party leadership on 22 October 2026. Two days later on October 24, Poland 2050's National Board voted to remove her from the party altogether, ending her term without a replacement figure.)	24 October 2026 – present

=== Vice-chairs ===
- Ewa Schädler (First Vice-chair)
- Adam Rudawski (Second Vice-chair)
- Szymon Hołownia

=== Treasurer ===
- Łukasz Osmalak

=== General Secretary ===
- Robert Sitnik

=== Chairman of the parliamentary club ===
- Szymon Hołownia

== Election results ==
=== Presidential ===
Election	1st round			2nd round		
Election	Candidate	# of overall votes	% of overall vote	Candidate	# of overall votes	% of overall vote
2025	Szymon Hołownia	978,901	4.99 (#5)	Supported Rafał Trzaskowski	10,237,286	49.1 (#2)

=== Sejm ===
Election	Leader	Votes	%	Seats	+/–	Government
2023	Szymon Hołownia	1,561,542	7.2 (#3)	33 / 460	New	PiS Minority (2023)
2023	Szymon Hołownia	1,561,542	7.2 (#3)	33 / 460	New	KO–PL2050–KP–NL (2023-2026)
2023	Szymon Hołownia	1,561,542	7.2 (#3)	33 / 460	New	KO–KP–NL–PL2050–C (2026-present)
2023	As part of the Third Way coalition, that won 65 seats in total.					

=== Senate ===
Election	Leader	Votes	%	Seats	+/–	Majority
2023	Szymon Hołownia	622,693	2.9	4 / 100	New	KO–PL2050–KP–NL
2023	As part of the Senate Pact 2023 coalition, that won 66 seats.					

=== European Parliament ===
Election	Leader	Votes	%	Seats	+/–	EP Group
2024	Szymon Hołownia	813,238	6.91 (#4)	1 / 53	New	RE
2024	As part of the Third Way coalition, that won 3 seats in total.					

=== Regional assemblies ===
Election	Leader	Votes	%	Seats	+/–
2024	Szymon Hołownia	2,054,152	14.3 (#3)	22 / 552	New
2024	As part of Third Way, which won 80 seats in total.				

=== Party elections ===
Year	Office	Member	Primary			Secondary			Ref.
Year	Office	Member	Total	%	P.	Total	%	P.	Ref.
2026	Party; Chairmanship	Katarzyna Pełczyńska-Nałęcz	277	42.23%	1st	350	53.27%	1st	
2026	Party; Chairmanship	Paulina Hennig-Kloska	131	19.97%	2nd	307	46.73%	2nd	
2026	Party; Chairmanship	Joanna Mucha	119	18.14%	3rd	—N/a			
2026	Party; Chairmanship	Others (Note: Ryszard Petru and Rafał Kasprzyk.)	129	19.66%	—N/a				
