= New Poland – Centre =

Parliamentary group in Polish Senate

New Poland – Centre Nowa Polska – Centrum
- Chamber: Senate
- Legislature(s): 11th term
- Foundation: 18 March 2026
- Member parties: New Poland; Centrum Polska
- National affiliation: Senate Pact 2023; 15 October Coalition
- Leader: Grzegorz Fedorowicz
- Deputy leader: Andrzej Dziuba
- Representation: 7 / 100 (7%)
- Ideology: Liberalism
- Political position: Centre
- Website: New Poland website Centrum Polska website

New Poland – Centre (Polish: Nowa Polska – Centrum, NP–C) is a Polish parliamentary group in the 11th term Senate. It was founded on 18 March 2026 by the senators of New Poland and Centrum Polska as a springboard towards further cooperation between the two parties. It is part of the ruling 15 October Coalition and Senate Pact 2023. New Poland is a party founded in 2025 by senators who ran as independents as part of the Senate Pact 2023 in the 2023 Polish parliamentary election, while Centrum Polska is a political association founded in 2026 by MPs who left Poland 2050 as a result of internal disputes following the 2026 Poland 2050 leadership election.

== History ==
Founding members of New Poland – Centre
Member	Allegiance
Grzegorz Fedorowicz	Centrum Polska
Piotr Masłowski	Centrum Polska
Jacek Trela	Centrum Polska
Andrzej Dziuba	New Poland
Zygmunt Frankiewicz	New Poland
Wadim Tyszkiewicz	New Poland
Mirosław Różański	Independent (previously Third Way)

On 18 February 2026, 15 Sejm and 3 Senate MPs of Poland 2050 left the party and created their own, Centrum. This decision was made following the election of Katarzyna Pełczyńska-Nałęcz as the leader of Poland 2050 in late January. Accusing Pełczyńska-Nałęcz of a left-wing turn, the 18 MPs declared that Centrum would become a liberal, business-oriented, and centrist party. Immediately after the creation of Centrum, its members expressed interest in working together with New Poland, a fellow centrist party created in 2025. The leadership of New Poland also stated in its interest in cooperation. Both parties stated that they have a lot of in common and are considering creating a joint Senate group, as well as running together in the 2027 Polish parliamentary election.

The creation of New Poland – Centre was announced a month later, on 18 March 2026, by seven senators. Three of them, Grzegorz Fedorowicz, Piotr Masłowski, and Jacek Trela, are members of Centrum Polska, while Andrzej Dziuba, Zygmunt Frankiewicz, and Wadim Tyszkiewicz are members of New Poland. They were joined by the independent senator Mirosław Różański. Grzegorz Fedorowicz became the leader of the group, and Andrzej Dziuba became the deputy leader.

Members of the group stated that the cooperation between New Poland and Centrum is an "ideological alliance" rather than a technical one, united by common goals. They also stated that both New Poland and Centrum could pursue closer cooperation should Centrum become a political party. Members of the group stated that New Poland – Centre will remain in the ruling coalition and its Senate-related alliance, the Senate Pact 2023. The three Centrum Polska senator, as well as Mirosław Różański, used to be the members of the Third Way Senate Group prior to becoming independents. Third Way was a part of the Senate Pact 2023.

Soon after its creation, New Poland – Centre announced that it is trying to expand its membership. Its members stated that they are open to cooperating with Jacek Włosowicz, an independent senator elected from the electoral list of Law and Justice who has become critical of his political environment, stating in a public interview that Law and Justice is becoming a "nationalist party", and being the only senator from the Law and Justice parliamentary group to support the government's bill to take a SAFE loan.

The group stated that it is working to expand beyond its founding senators or Włosowicz, although it stated that it is not pursuing cooperation with Poland 2050. It stated that the talks to transfer more senator to New Poland – Centre are underway; the group also stated that it is not seeking to gain positions such as the one of Deputy Marshal of the Senate of Poland, and instead wishes to focus on legislative effort. It declared that it is working on two bills that it would submit to the Senate; one bill would is to allow Social Welfare Homes (Polish: Dom pomocy społecznej, DPS) to partly cover the costs of residents’ stay from the estates of deceased residents to ease the burden on local governments, while the other bill regards military reforms.

== Ideology ==
The group accentuates that it is not a "technical alliance" but rather an ideological one. New Poland and Centrum declare to share common interests, goals, and to desire same policies. Its members described it as a "wide center that gives one room to maneuver". New Poland MPs are to focus on local governments, including mayors, voivodes and city presidents, while Centrum MPs desire to draw in more former Poland 2050 members. The group stated that it will support every initiative of the ruling coalition that strengthen the security of Poland. Some of the goals listed by Nowa Polska – Centrum include building a professional and more efficient Armed Forces, pass reforms to improve the financial stability of local governments, and building a welfare system based on shared responsibility.

New Poland – Centre is considered to be centrist. Its members see themselves as a middle path between the liberal Civic Coalition and conservative Law and Justice; in courting the dissident moderate senator of Law and Justice, Jacek Włosowicz, the group argued that Włosowicz aligns closer to them than the ruling Civic Coalition. The group announced two major bills that it is working on – the first one is a bill proposed by Andrzej Dziuba that would allow Social Welfare Homes to cover part of maintenance costs from the estate of deceased residents. The second bill is being worked on Mirosław Różański, and aims to reform the Polish military. The group also stated that it has "several dozen draft bills ready" concerning reforming local governments that may be brought before the legislature.
