= New Poland =

Political party in Poland

New Poland Nowa Polska
- Abbreviation: NOWA
- Chairman: Zygmunt Frankiewicz
- Secretary: Gabriela Staszkiewicz
- Founders: Wadim Tyszkiewicz; Andrzej Dziuba; Zygmunt Frankiewicz
- Founded: 16 September 2025
- Registered: 30 October 2025
- Split from: Senate Pact 2023; Yes! For Poland
- Headquarters: ul. Marii Konopnickiej 6/229, 00–491 Warsaw
- Membership (2025): ~50
- Ideology: Conservative liberalism Economic liberalism
- Political position: Centre
- National affiliation: New Poland – Centre
- Colours: Blue; Red
- Sejm: 0 / 460
- Senate: 3 / 100

Website
- www.nowapolska.online

New Poland (Polish: Nowa Polska, NOWA) is a centrist political party in Poland. The party was founded in September 2025 based on a Senate circle of Senate Pact 2023 independents on the initiative of senator Wadim Tyszkiewicz, after which it selected senator Zygmunt Frankiewicz as its party chairman.

== Senate Circle Independents and Self-Governing ==
The Senate Circle Independents and Self-Governing (Polish: Koło Senackie Niezależni i Samorządni) was created by senators elected in the 2023 Polish parliamentary election as part of the Senate Pact 2023 who ran not as members of political parties but through independent electoral committees within the Pact. The circle had four members — Andrzej Dziuba, Zygmunt Frankiewicz, Krzysztof Kwiatkowski (leader at the time) and Wadim Tyszkiewicz — until 22 February 2024, when Kwiatkowski joined the Civic Coalition Parliamentary Club. On 6 March 2024, Frankiewicz became the leader of the circle.

== History ==
=== Preliminary organization ===
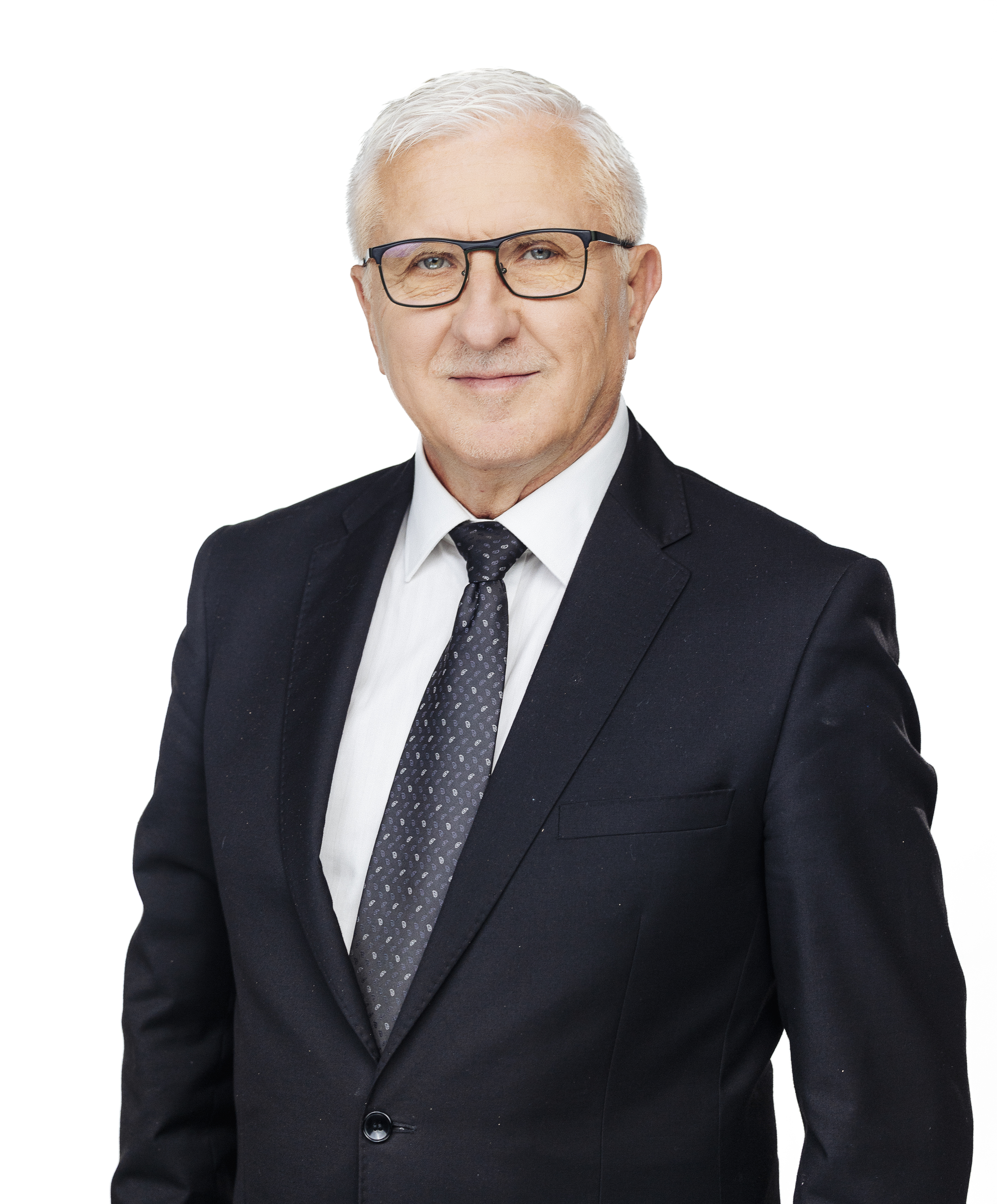
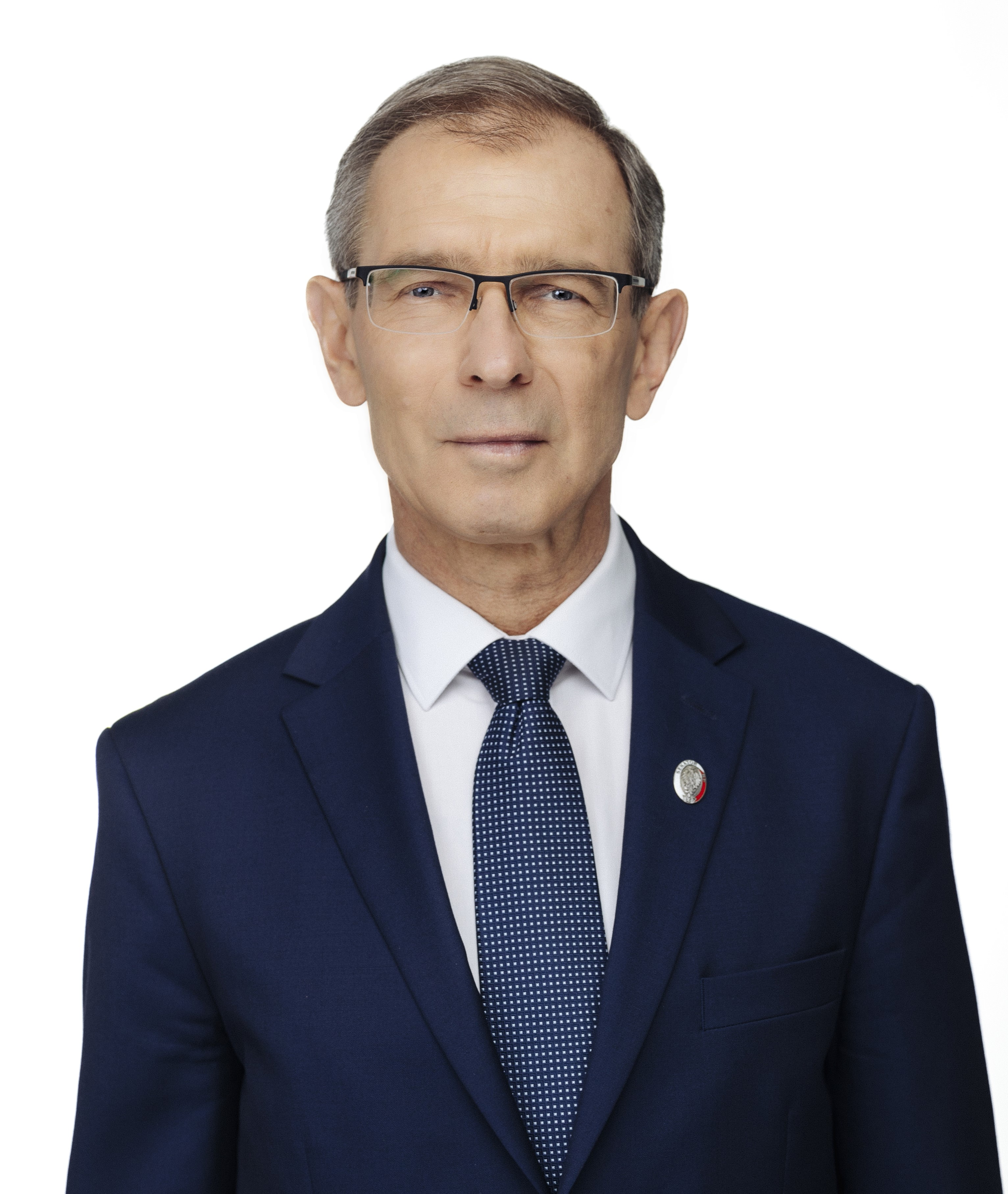
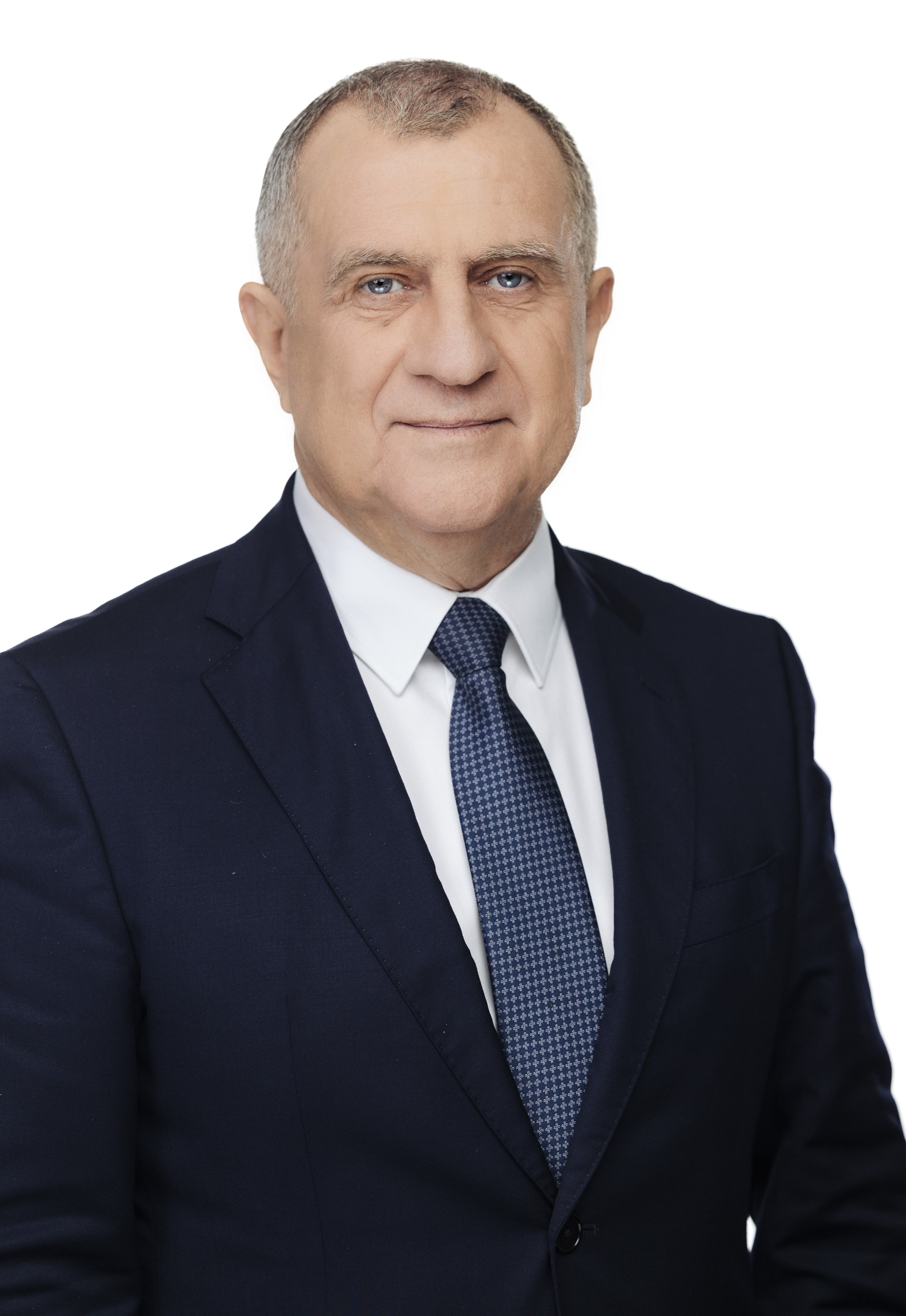
Wadim Tyszkiewicz, Zygmunt Frankiewicz and Andrzej Dziuba, senators founding the party

Following the defeat of liberal Rafał Trzaskowski in the 2025 Polish presidential election, Wadim Tyszkiewicz announced his retirement from Polish politics in early June 2025. He claims to have "fallen into depression right after the presidential election", believing that the supposed "golden age of Poland" that in his belief started in 1989 had ended, given the success of Karol Nawrocki, Law and Justice, Confederation and Grzegorz Braun.

However, his stance quickly changed in response to the rising support for the right-wing in Poland, and in an interview with Rzeczpospolita on 26 June 2025, Tyszkiewicz announced that he would be constructing a new political group in opposition to the "PO–PiS duopoly" and "brown Poland", seeking to "prevent the Hungarian scenario in Poland" and "rule of the populist far-right". He stated: "I am driven by the awareness of the threat that awaits Poland if, in two years' time, these parties gain power, and God forbid, a constitutional majority. Then we will be on a slippery slope. This motivated me to take intensive action".

He was joined by the other senators in his circle, Dziuba and Frankiewicz, "experienced" self-government activists, among which activists of the Yes! For Poland and OK Poland associations. In July, Tyszkiewicz announced the creation of a new Senate club called "Nonpartisan Self-Government", however, this was never completed and members of New Poland remain part of the Independents and Self-Governing circle.

=== Establishment ===
New Poland applied for registration on 10 September 2025 and tried to hold its first press conference on the same day. However, due to the Russian drone incursion into Poland, the press conference got delayed, and was held on 16 September. The party was registered on 30 October 2025. Senator Zygmunt Frankiewicz became the party's first chairman.

New Poland states it will start independently in the next parliamentary election, aiming for a result of "double-digit" result, putting local government members blocked from re-election in their current positions by newly-introduced term limits on their electoral lists for the Sejm. The party held its first convention in Poznań on 26 October 2025, and plans to hold a bigger convention once the party is registered. Frankiewicz announced a party convention on 20 June 2026.

=== Nowa Polska – Centrum ===
On 18 March 2026, the three senators of New Poland: Andrzej Dziuba, Zygmunt Frankiewicz, and Wadim Tyszkiewicz, joined ranks with the senators Grzegorz Fedorowicz, Piotr Masłowski, and Jacek Trela of Centrum Polska, along with the independent senator Mirosław Różański, to create a new Senate group New Poland – Centre (Polish: Nowa Polska – Centrum). Grzegorz Fedorowicz became the leader of the group. Andrzej Dziuba became the deputy leader. Members of the group stated that the cooperation between New Poland and Centrum is an "ideological alliance" rather than a technical one, united by common goals. They also stated that both New Poland and Centrum could pursue closer cooperation should Centrum become a political party. New Poland – Centre announced two bills that it wishes to present – first is a bill proposed by Andrzej Dziuba that would allow Social Welfare Homes (Polish: Dom pomocy społecznej, DPS) to cover part of maintenance costs from the estate of deceased residents. The second bill is being worked on Mirosław Różański, and aims to reform the Polish military. Members of the group confirmed that New Poland – Centre will remain in the ruling coalition and its Senate-related alliance, the Senate Pact 2023.

== Structure ==
When founded, Zygmunt Frankiewicz was selected as the party chairman, with vice-chairmen Wadim Tyszkiewicz and Arkadiusz Wiśniewski and general secretary Gabriela Staszkiewicz. In the summer of 2026, Wiśniewski left New Poland.

=== Party chairman ===
| No. | Image | Chairman | Tenure |
|---|---|---|---|
| 1 | | Zygmunt Frankiewicz | 16 September 2025 – Incumbent |

== Ideology ==
The party presents itself as an alternative to the two biggest parties, Civic Platform (PO) and Law and Justice (PiS), rejecting a coalition with right-wing PiS and the Confederation of the Polish Crown or left-wing Razem, and other "extremists", presenting them as fascist or communist. NOWA states that it represents disillusioned voters, and claims it wants to "unite, not divide" Poles. The party rejects populism and opposes the "brownization of Poland" — according to Tyszkiewicz, the party is an alternative for young voters to the far-right Confederation, among which the Confederation dominates, noting that NOWA and Confederation share economically liberal views.

New Poland is of a conservative-liberal and centrist ideological profile. Its party platform is focused on economic liberalism, self-governance, healthcare reform and education reform, distancing itself from worldview matters (such as abortion rights). Its main proposals include tax reform—"simple, transparent, low, and inevitable taxes"—and administrative reform by eliminating the centrally-appointed office of voivode and empowering the locally-appointed Voivodeship marshal, as well as the abolishment of term limits for local government members. It denounces "quasi-communist slogans of the left" or populists that support wealth redistribution from the rich to the poor. New Poland is against the party subsidy system.

The party was compared to Ruch Palikota, Poland 2050 or Modern in being a liberal anti-establishment party, and Marek Materek's New Democracy – Yes or Bezpartyjni Samorządowcy as a party made by local government activists. Ideologically, it was compared to the Civic Platform.

=== Leadership ===
Tyszkiewicz announced that the party would begin without a clear leader. The party opposes the "leader-driven party" (Polish: partia wodzowska) model, seeking to avoid the mistakes of previous liberal parties such as Ruch Palikota, Poland 2050 and Modern. The party seeks to coalesce self-government members and entrepreneurs.
