= Centre Union (Poland) =

Political party in Poland

Centre Union Unia Centrum
- President: Paulina Hennig-Kloska
- Parliamentary club chairman: Mirosław Suchoń
- General Secretary: Rafał Kasprzyk
- Vice-chairman: List: Michał Kobosko Mirosław Suchoń Elżbieta Bińczycka Ewa Szymanowska
- Founder: Paulina Hennig-Kloska
- Founded: 18 February 2026 (parliamentary circle); 2 March 2026 (political association); 12 July 2026 (political party)
- Registered: 26 May 2026 (political association)
- Merger of: Centre Poland; Union of European Democrats
- Split from: Poland 2050
- Membership (2026): 800
- Ideology: Liberalism (Polish); Neoliberalism; Pro-Europeanism
- Political position: Centre
- National affiliation: 15 October Coalition; New Poland – Centre
- European affiliation: ALDE Party
- European Parliament group: Renew Europe
- Colours: Blue and green
- Sejm: 15 / 460
- Senate: 3 / 100
- European Parliament: 1 / 53

Website
- centrumpolska.eu

The Centre Union (Polish: Unia Centrum) is a political party in Poland. It was founded on 12 July 2026 and emerged from Centre Poland (Polish: Centrum Polska), a political association which in turn emerged from the Centre (Polish: Centrum), a parliamentary group in the Sejm and Senate of Poland that was created on 18 February 2026 by 15 lower house members and three senators who left the Poland 2050 party as a result of power struggle within the party after its leadership election. It is led by Paulina Hennig-Kloska, who served as deputy leader of Poland 2050, and narrowly lost the leadership election to Katarzyna Pełczyńska-Nałęcz. It is ideologically centrist, economically liberal, pro-European, and supports the ruling October 15 Coalition.

== Background ==
Centrum was created by former lower house members and senators of the Poland 2050 party, which was elected to the Sejm and Senate in the 2023 Polish parliamentary election (winning 33 seats in the Sejm) as a part of the Third Way coalition, and became part of the ruling 15 October Coalition. The party's leader and Marshal of the Sejm at the time, Szymon Hołownia, ran in the 2025 Polish presidential election, in which he won 4.99% of the popular vote, a result that was considered a failure for the party. Hołownia's popularity in the party also declined after media revealed his secret meeting with Jarosław Kaczyński, the chairman of the right-wing opposition party Law and Justice.

After Hołownia's failure in the presidential election, the Third Way coalition was dissolved in June 2025, and in December 2025, he announced his intention to step down as the leader of Poland 2050. As a result, a leadership election was called, taking place in January 2026. Hołownia's resignation exposed divisions and organisational weaknesses within the party. Initially, a large group of politicians from Poland 2050 ran for the leadership, but ultimately two politicians fought in the run-off: Katarzyna Pełczyńska-Nałęcz, Minister of Funds and Regional Policy, and Paulina Hennig-Kloska, Minister of Climate and Environment. All first-round candidates, such as Joanna Mucha, Michał Kobosko, and Ryszard Petru, endorsed Hennig-Kloska, while Hołownia planned a smooth transition of power to Katarzyna Pełczyńska-Nałęcz.

The leadership election exposed internal divisions and conflicts within the party. The second round of the election was invalidated, and was called again in a few weeks. In the repeated second round, Pełczyńska-Nałęcz narrowly won. Despite assurances of the party's politicians that the end of the leadership election would put an end to internal conflicts, the party grew further divided after Pełczyńska-Nałęcz's election. Attempts to manipulate the electoral process as well as leaks from the party's internal communication channels were exposed and widely circulated in the media. After her election, Pełczyńska-Nałęcz employed her daughter to help manage the party's social media, which was denounced as nepotism. The party had become increasingly divided between two camps — the supporters of Pełczyńska-Nałęcz, and supporters of Hennig-Kloska.

The direct cause of the split in the party became the "muzzle resolution" (Polish: uchwała kagańcowa), which was adopted during the party's National Council meeting shortly after Pełczyńska-Nałęcz's election. The resolution, intended to calm tensions within the party, forbade any changes to the party's leadership and structures, and suspended disciplinary proceedings until the National Convention that scheduled for 21 March. Its implementation was deemed a response to the attempts of Hennig-Kloska's supporters to remove Paweł Śliz, the leader of Poland 2050 parliamentary club, and his deputy Bartosz Romowicz, from their positions. The resolution caused outrage in the party, and Hennig-Kloska denounced it as a sign of "one-person decision-making" by Pełczyńska-Nałęcz.

== History ==
Founding members of Centre
Member	Parliamentary position	PL2050 position
Paulina Hennig-Kloska	Member of the Sejm	Deputy chair
Sławomir Ćwik	Member of the Sejm	Deputy chair
Rafał Kasprzyk	Member of the Sejm	Deputy chair
Izabela Bodnar	Member of the Sejm	Not a party member
Elżbieta Burkiewicz	Member of the Sejm	National Council member (Note: Member of the National Council from the Poland 2050 parliamentary representation)
Żaneta Cwalina-Śliwowska	Member of the Sejm	Not a party member
Grzegorz Fedorowicz	Member of the Senate	National Council member
Rafał Komarewicz	Member of the Sejm	—
Aleksandra Leo	Member of the Sejm	—
Piotr Masłowski	Member of the Senate	National Council member
Barbara Okuła	Member of the Sejm	National Council member
Barbara Oliwiecka	Member of the Sejm	National Council member
Ryszard Petru	Member of the Sejm	—
Norbert Pietrykowski	Member of the Sejm	—
Marcin Skonieczka	Member of the Sejm	National Council member
Mirosław Suchoń	Member of the Sejm	—
Ewa Szymanowska	Member of the Sejm	—
Jacek Trela	Member of the Senate	National Council member

=== Split ===
On 14 February 2026, lower house member Żaneta Cwalina-Śliwowska became the first Poland 2050 member to leave the party, followed shortly thereafter by the MEP Michał Kobosko and former Deputy Minister of Foreign Affairs Anna Radwan-Röhrenschef. They were also followed by the Deputy Minister of National Defense Paweł Zalewski, and Joanna Mucha, former Deputy Minister of Education and Science. Deserting and wavering Poland 2050 MPs also contemplated joining the Civic Coalition or the Polish People's Party. Ultimately, on 17 February, Hennig-Kloska and her supporters made a decision to leave Poland 2050 and create a rival political formation. The next day, on 18 February, a total of 18 party members, led by Hennig-Kloska, announced that they left Poland 2050 and created Centrum. Hennig-Kloska declared that the parliamentary circle will also become a political party. Centrum presented its own logo - letter 'C' in blue to green gradient.

Apart from Hennig-Kloska, members of the Centrum at the time of its creation were lower house members Mirosław Suchoń, Aleksandra Leo, Ryszard Petru, Marcin Skonieczka, Norbert Pietrykowski, Ewa Szymanowska, Sławomir Ćwik, Rafał Kasprzyk, Elżbieta Burkiewicz, Żaneta Cwalina-Śliwowska, Rafał Komarewicz, Izabela Bodnar, Barbara Okuła, Barbara Oliwiecka, as well three senators from Poland 2050 — Piotr Masłowski, Grzegorz Fedorowicz, and Jacek Trela. Centrum has also been endorsed by MEP Michał Kobosko, who stated: "As a member of the centrist-liberal Renew Europe group in the European Parliament, I wholeheartedly and confidently support the actions of my colleagues, members of parliament and senators of the newly formed Centrum Parliamentary Club."

Hennig-Kloska stated that Centrum will support the ruling 15 October Coalition that Poland 2050 is a part of. The creation of the parliamentary circle was condemned by Pełczyńska-Nałęcz, who stated that its members have failed to accept "the choice of the democratic majority" of the party members. Szymon Hołownia, the former party leader, also condemned Centrum, stating that he feels betrayed by its members and that he regrets resigning as the leader of the party. He argued that the reason for defections was hatred towards Pełczyńska-Nałęcz, and that Centrum members will become "Civic Coalition's electoral list fillers". Shortly after the formation of Centrum was declared, Marshal of the Sejm Włodzimierz Czarzasty confirmed that he has received the parliamentary circle's application and that its existence has become a fact.

=== Registration ===
On 19 February, Centrum was formally registered as a parliamentary club and was listed on the Sejm's website. Centrum declared that it will also become a political association and a political party, and its members stated that it would be a "party for entrepreneurs". On 20 February, Aleksandra Leo announced that Centrum is being registered as a political association, and that it will also become a political party, of a liberal and pro-business profile. Centrum Polska also entered talks with New Poland, a centrist party founded in 2025; both sides expressed their willingness to form an electoral coalition, and to form a joint Senate group.

On 23 February, Wojciech Wołoch, the voivode of the Lublin Voivodeship and member of Poland 2050, had left his party. Shortly beforehand, 30 activists from Poland 2050 in Świętokrzyskie Voivodeship had left the party and declared their willingness to join Centrum. On 24 February, Centrum prepared documents needed to register a political party that it would submit the next day, on 25 February. The association is to be liberal and business-oriented. It also organized a meeting which was attended by 90 people, two-thirds being former Poland 2050 activists.

=== Political association ===
On 24 February, Centre held its first club meeting, where they elected Mirosław Suchoń as the chairman of the parliamentary club, Ewa Szymanowska as secretary and Norbert Pietrykowski as disciplinary officer. On 27 February, Centrum declared that it had founded a political association. It held a general meeting of the founding members, established a resolution, and elected the board. Hennig-Kloska was unanimously elected the president of the association, and stated that the association was founded in view to eventually establish a political party. On 2 March 2026, the association was registered as Centrum Polska and had 100 members, consisting of Centrum MPs and local Poland 2050 who defected to the association. Rafał Kasprzyk was nominated as a board member responsible for building the association's structures.

Centrum Polska announced that it is planning to transform itself into a political party, but will focus on active involvement and recruitment of party members first. Hennig-Kloska stated that a political association is the most convenient and safest form to legally gather members. The association declared that it remains in the ruling coalition, and will not seek the position of deputy speaer or deputy prime minister in the cabinet. The creation of the association facilitiated further defection of Poland 2050 activists to Centrum Polska. In the Lower Silesian Voivodeship, Centrum Polska had claimed 99% of Poland 2050's active members. In April 2026, prominent Poland 2050 activists in the Lublin Voivodeship left the party to join the Centrum association. These included Honorata Słomiany, the Poland 2050's former mayor candidate in Włodawa, Rafał Maksywoicz, former secretary of the party's structures in the Lublin Voideship, and the Lublin City Council member Magdalena Szczygieł-Mitrus.

On 18 March 2026, three of the Centrum senators: Grzegorz Fedorowicz, Piotr Masłowski, and Jacek Trela, along with the independent senator Mirosław Różański, joined ranks with the three senators of New Poland: Andrzej Dziuba, Zygmunt Frankiewicz, and Wadim Tyszkiewicz, to create a new Senate group New Poland – Centre (Polish: Nowa Polska - Centrum). Grzegorz Fedorowicz became the leader of the group. Andrzej Dziuba became the deputy leader. Members of the group stated that the cooperation between New Poland and Centrum is an "ideological alliance" rather than a technical one, united by common goals. They also stated that both New Poland and Centrum could pursue closer cooperation should Centrum become a political party. New Poland - Centre announced two bills that it wishes to present — first is a bill proposed by Andrzej Dziuba that would allow Social Welfare Homes (Polish: Dom pomocy społecznej, DPS) to cover part of maintenance costs from the estate of deceased residents. The second bill is being worked on Mirosław Różański, and aims to reform the Polish military. Members of the group confirmed that New Poland - Centre will remain in the ruling coalition and its Senate-related alliance, the Senate Pact 2023.

On 26 March, the MPs of Law and Justice and Confederation Liberty and Independence submitted a motion of no confidence against Hennig-Kloska as Minister of Climate and Environment to the Sejm. Hennig-Kloska was accused of undermining Polish economy by being "a staunch supporter of implementing the so-called climate policy of the European Union at a time when everyone already knows that this climate policy is dragging the European economy down." MPs supporting the motion argued that Hennig-Kloska is "the face of this government’s disastrous policy on energy prices and the cost of living", claiming that she was “sabotaging the state by attempting to base energy sovereignty on renewable energy sources”, “acting in the interests of the wind power lobby and renewable energy sources”, and “pushing for the development of offshore wind farms, falsely presented as a recipe for cheap, safe, and reliable energy for Poles.” The vote on Hennig-Kloska would take place in mid-April. RMF FM argued that Hennig-Kloska might lose the vote of confidence as part of the ruling coalition is inclined to vote against her — Poland 2050 given her defection, and the Polish People's Party which criticized her for pursuing "leftist activism", stating that it prefers a "conservative" environmental policy.

Prior to the vote, Hennig-Kloska met with the representatives of the Polish People's Party in order to discuss the criticisms of her tenure, but refused to meet with Polska 2050. The motion of no confidence was ultimately voted upon on 30 April; 213 MPs voted for no confidence, 238 against, and zero abstained, meaning that Hennig-Kloska kept her position. All members of the ruling coalition voted for Hennig-Kloska, with the exception of a single Polska 2050 MP Bartosz Romowicz, who voted against her. Following the vote, Centrum Polska announced its ambition to expand its role in the ruling cabinet and started negotiations with the Civic Coalition on this matter. Centrum Polska wishes to nominate Mirosław Suchoń and Aleksandra Leo as deputy marshals of the Sejm, Jacek Trela as a Senate deputy marshal, and to make Żaneta Cwalina-Śliwowska a member of the Ministry of Sport and Tourism.

On 26 May 2026, Centrum Polska was formally registered as a political association.

=== Centre Union ===
On 12 July 2026, association president Paulina Hennig-Kloska announced the formation of "Unia Centrum", a political party to represent the group. The party is a merger of the political association Centrum Polska and Elżbieta Bińczycka's Union of European Democrats. Hennig-Kloska stated that the party's stated goal is combining economic growth with environmental protection, and to represent the values that "were the basis for building the foundations of a free Poland after 1989". The official party colors are blue and green, with blue standing for "freedom, entrepreneurship, modernity and a strong economy", and green for "responsibility for the environment, clean air, energy security and care for future generations". First program convention of the party is to be held in September 2026. However, four MPs of Centrum Polska are undecided on whether to participate in the merger or not: Norbert Pietrykowski, Rafał Komarewicz, Marcin Skonieczka and Ryszard Petru. Petru did not sign the programmatic declaration, but declared his cooperation in creating the economic program of the new party.

Hennig-Kloska became the leader of the Centre Union, while Michał Kobosko, Mirosław Suchoń, Elżbieta Bińczycka and Ewa Szymanowska were appointed as the party's vice-presidents. Rafał Kasprzyk is the general secretary of the new party, while Elżbieta Burkiewicz became the treasurer. The members of the executive committee are: Aleksandra Leo, Sławomir Ćwik, Tomasz Sakowski, Anna Sporyszkiewicz, Piotr Masłowski, Jacek Trela and Barbara Okuła. Legally, the Centre Union will be based on the statue of the Union of European Democrats, which will change its name and incorporate Centre Poland into its ranks. In the European Parliament, the party is to become a part of the Alliance of Liberals and Democrats for Europe Party.

== Ideology ==
Centre Union has a neoliberal ideology and promotes the interests of business owners. Conforming to its name, the association is considered to unite politicians of a centrist-liberal profile, and to form a part of the Polish centrist camp. Members of Centre Union have described themselves as "loyalists of Donald Tusk" and as pro-European. Centre Union is opposed to the policy of Poland 2050 under Pełczyńska-Nałęcz, who postulates assertiveness and independence from the ruling coalition and social market economy. Instead, members of Centrum Polska proposed policies such as decreasing the health insurance contribution for entrepreneurs (opposed by Poland 2050), and implementing the 0% deposit mortgage (opposed by the New Left and Pełczyńska-Nałęcz). Criticizing the assertive course of Pełczyńska-Nałęcz, the party's members stated that "our opponent is Grzegorz Braun, not our coalition partners." Piotr Masłowski stated that Centre Union would be a centrist party that would not "use leftist language".

The party listed competitive economy, support for entrepreneurship, creation of well-paid and stable jobs, responsible energy transition, strong local government, national and public security, and the strengthening of Poland’s position within the European Union as its main ideological ponts. It also stated that it intends to court the "dormant" Third Way electorate. The party's colors are to represent its values — blue is supposed to stand for freedom, entrepreneurship and economic growth, while green is to symbolise transition to green energy, environmental protection and care for future generations.

It advocates "promoting entrepreneurship among Poles, creating sound economic legislation, and deregulation". It intends to be "the voice of the middle class and small and medium-sized businesses". It postulates legalizing the possession of up to 15 grams of marijuana for personal use and the cultivation of a single plant on private property, as long as it is not accessible to the public. The association also seeks to promote animal welfare and protection through introducing mandatory at volunteering at animal shelters, and incentivizing energy transition towards renewable energy. It also postulates increasing the cash transaction limit from 15,000 PLN to 25,000 PLN, and raising tax thresholds for small and medium-sized businesses. According to its members, Centre Union protests the perceived leftwards shift of Poland 2050, accusing it of having "shifted somewhat to the left, toward more socialist views", at the expense of building a "strong economy". Centre Union is supported by Polish billionaire Rafał Brzoska.

The leader of the party, Paulina Hennig-Kloska, represented the liberal faction of Poland 2050 and was a former member of the neoliberal Nowoczesna party prior to joining Poland 2050. During the 2026 Poland 2050 leadership election, she described herself as a liberal and promised "liberalism with human face" which would be "a combination of social sensitivity and economic common sense, enormous respect for labor, [and] adding a green dimension instead of burying our heads in the sand". She is also a supporter of cooperating with Prime Minister Donald Tusk. Kobosko, who endorsed Centre Union, criticized Pełczyńska-Nałęcz for promoting "strongly socialist program ideas [which were] not consulted with anyone", including the cadastral tax and eliminating a flat-rate tax for sole proprietorships. He also accused the leader of Poland 2050 of postulating a "struggle against the rich and capitalists". Centre Union members accused Pełczyńska-Nałęcz of "abandoning entrepreneurs and shift towards left-wing slogans."
