= 15 October Coalition =

2023 political alliance in Poland

15 October Coalition Koalicja 15 października
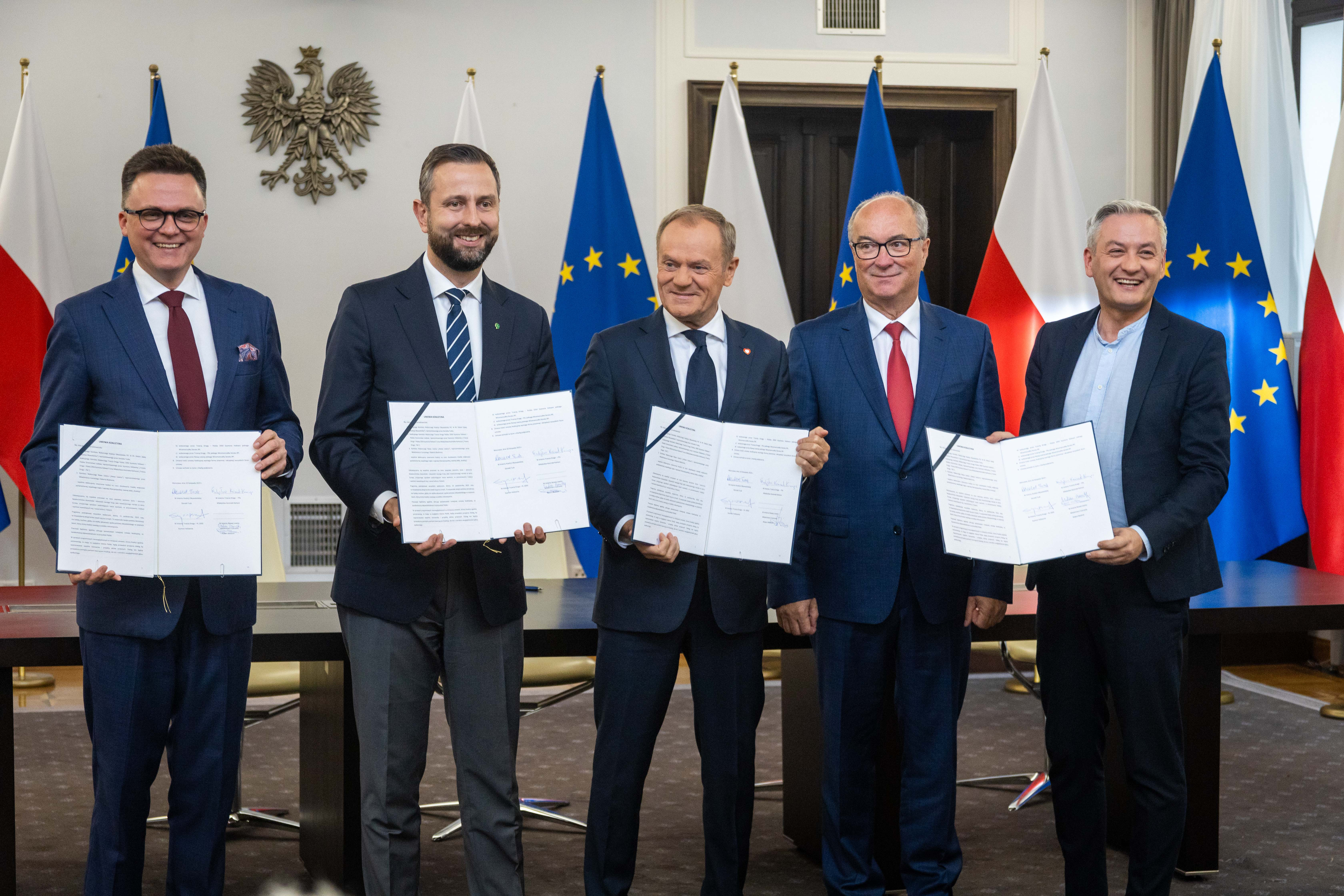
- The Coalition's party leaders. From left to right: Szymon Hołownia (Poland 2050), Władysław Kosiniak-Kamysz (PSL), Donald Tusk (KO), Włodzimierz Czarzasty and Robert Biedroń (New Left)
- Founded: 10 November 2023
- Ideology: Rainbow coalition Liberal conservatism Pro-Europeanism; Factions: Progressivism; Conservatism; Neoliberalism
- Political position: Centre-right
- Members: Civic Coalition; Poland 2050; Centre; Polish People's Party; New Left
- Sejm: 239 / 460
- Senate (Senate Pact 2023): 63 / 100
- European Parliament: 27 / 53
- Regional assemblies: 298 / 552
- Voivodes: 16 / 16
- Voivodeship marshals: 12 / 16

The 15 October Coalition (Polish: Koalicja 15 października) has been the ruling government of Poland since 13 December 2023. It is a big tent coalition that includes various political parties. The coalition was formed after the parliamentary election held on 15 October. Donald Tusk, the then prime minister–designate, coined the term in his speech to the Sejm, announcing the new government's plans after a vote of no confidence for Mateusz Morawiecki.

Prior to assuming power, the parties opposing the ruling Law and Justice-led United Right (with the exception of the far-right Confederation) were referred to as the Democratic Opposition (Polish: Demokratyczna opozycja) in the lead up to the 2023 elections. The firmly left wing Left Together party (Polish: Partia Razem) originally planned to enter the coalition, together with the New Left party as part of The Left coalition; however, due to a number of key issues being left out of the coalition agreement, the party has opted to stay out of government but has also voted to support Tusk's government in votes of confidence. Razem would later leave The Left and move into the opposition.

Law and Justice politicians and some right-wing media outlets refer to the coalition as the 13 December Coalition. The name refers to the date of the establishment of the government by President Andrzej Duda on 13 December 2023 and is an allusion to the 42nd anniversary of the introduction of martial law in Poland on 13 December 1981 by General Wojciech Jaruzelski.

== Ideology ==
The coalition has been described as liberal-conservative. Political scientists Krzysztof Jasiewicz and Agnieszka Jasiewicz-Betkiewicz described the coalition as "a truly rainbow coalition, ranging in cultural matters from radical left to moderate conservatives and in socio-economic policies from welfarestate socialists to pro-market neo-liberals". The main parts of the coalition, namely Civic Coalition, Third Way (former alliance of Poland 2050 and Polish Coalition), and The Left are considered liberal, conservative, and progressive, respectively. The coalition is considered to have pursued a largely conservative agenda. Dan Davison described it as a "a government dominated by the neoliberal center-right", with "a marginal, nominally left-wing voice" represented by the New Left. Writing on the coalition's ideological focus, Verfassungsblog wrote:

The so-called “15 October Coalition” – an alliance of the liberal Civic Platform (PO), the Left, and the conservative Third Way – came to power in late 2023 in the atmosphere of democratic awakening and civic mobilization. Yet, despite its progressive commitments, the government soon shifted to the right. Key demands from its electoral base – including abortion reform and legal recognition of civil partnerships – were quietly sidelined. More tellingly, the coalition maintained several PiS-era policies, particularly its hardline stance on migration at the Belarusian border, effectively mirroring the very approach it had vocally condemned.

Political scientist Gavin Rae assessed the coalition as such:

The KO did much to extend the right-wing policies of the PiS. It has intensified the anti-migrant atmosphere which has long been building in the country, cancelling the right to asylum for some refugees crossing into Poland from Belarus and attempting to push them back across the border. Rather than taking meaningful steps to reverse the PiS legal reforms – designed to consolidate power in the executive – it has pursued a similar course of action to its predecessor: seizing control of the Polish public broadcaster by firing its directors and replacing them with sympathetic ones.

== Member parties ==
Coalition	Party	Ideology	Position	European affiliation	Leader(s)	MPs	Senators	MEPs	Sejmiks
Civic Coalition	Civic Coalition	Liberal conservatism Pro-Europeanism	Centre-right	EPP	Donald Tusk	130 / 460	36 / 100	19 / 53	198 / 552
Civic Coalition	The Greens	Green politics	Centre-left	EGP	Michał Suchora; Magdalena Gałkiewicz	2 / 460	0 / 100	0 / 53	1 / 552
Civic Coalition	AGROunia	Agrarian socialism	Left-wing	—N/a	Michał Kołodziejczak	1 / 460	0 / 100	0 / 53	0 / 552
Civic Coalition	Yes! For Poland	Regionalism	Centre-left	—N/a	Jacek Karnowski	2 / 460	1 / 100	0 / 53	4 / 552
Civic Coalition	Independents	—N/a	Left-wing to centre-right	—N/a	—N/a	20 / 460	7 / 100	2 / 53	7 / 552
Civic Coalition	Totals					156 / 460	44 / 100	21 / 53	210 / 552
Poland 2050		Liberal conservatism Christian democracy	Centre-right	Renew Europe	Katarzyna Pełczyńska-Nałęcz	15 / 460	1 / 100	0 / 53	3 / 552
New Poland–Centre (Note: New Poland–Centre is a parliamentary group formed on 19 March 2026 by Senators.)	Centre (Note: Centre is a parliamentary group formed on 18 February 2026 by MPs and Senators who left Poland 2050. Its members declared that Centre will also become a political party.)	Liberalism	Centre	Renew Europe	Paulina Hennig-Kloska	15 / 460	3 / 100	1 / 53	0 / 552
New Poland–Centre	New Poland	Conservative liberalism	Centre	—N/a	Zygmunt Frankiewicz	0 / 460	3 / 100	0 / 53	0 / 552
New Poland–Centre	Independents	—N/a	Centre-right	—N/a	—N/a	0 / 460	1 / 100	0 / 53	0 / 552
New Poland–Centre	Totals					15 / 460	7 / 100	1 / 53	0 / 552
Polish Coalition	Polish People's Party	Christian democracy Social conservatism	Centre-right to right-wing	EPP	Władysław Kosiniak-Kamysz	28 / 460	4 / 100	2 / 53	69 / 552
Polish Coalition	Centre for Poland	Liberal conservatism	Centre-right	—N/a	Ireneusz Raś	3 / 460	1 / 100	0 / 53	0 / 552
Polish Coalition	Independents	—N/a	Centre-right	—N/a	—N/a	1 / 460	2 / 100	0 / 53	0 / 552
Polish Coalition	Totals					32 / 460	7 / 100	2 / 53	69 / 552
The Left	New Left	Social democracy Social liberalism	Centre-left	PES	Włodzimierz Czarzasty	18 / 460	4 / 100	3 / 53	8 / 552
The Left	Polish Socialist Party	Democratic socialism	Left-wing	—N/a	Wojciech Konieczny	0 / 460	1 / 100	0 / 53	0 / 552
The Left	Labour Union	Social democracy	Centre-left	PES	Waldemar Witkowski	0 / 460	1 / 100	0 / 53	0 / 552
The Left	Independents	—N/a	Centre-left to left-wing	—N/a	—N/a	3 / 460	2 / 100	0 / 53	0 / 552
The Left	Totals					21 / 460	8 / 100	3 / 53	8 / 552

== See also ==
- Third Cabinet of Donald Tusk
- Senate Pact 2023
