= Senate Pact 2023 =

Electoral alliance in Poland

Senate Pact 2023 Pakt Senacki 2023
- Abbreviation: PS2023
- Organizer: Zygmunt Frankiewicz
- Founded: 28 February 2023; 3 years ago
- Ideology: Liberalism (Polish); Pro-Europeanism
- Political position: Big tent
- Pact members: Civic Coalition: Civic Coalition; The Greens; AGROunia; Supported by: (Note: The Senate Pact was also supported by the Alliance of Democrats; the party endorsed the Pact's candidate Rafał Trzaskowski in the 2025 Polish presidential election, and some of the party's members became involved in the campaign on behalf of the Civic Coalition. However, the party has since then become critical of the Civic Coalition and its broader environment, with the party's leader, Paweł Piskorski, denouncing Prime Minister Donald Tusk as an "emperor".); Everything for Gdańsk; Democratic Left Association; German Minority Electoral Committee; Sopot dla Ciebie; League of Polish Families; The Left: New Left; Polish Socialist Party; Labour Union; Common Tomorrow; Supported by: (Note: The Senate Pact was also supported by All-Poland Women's Strike which was a part of the New Left camp. However, after the 2023 parliamentary election, the organisation became increasingly hostile to the 15 October Coalition formed by the Pact, leading both sides to cut ties to each other.); The City Is Ours; Citizens of Poland; Former members: Partia Razem; Polish Coalition: Polish People's Party; Centre for Poland; Young Poland Association; Supported by: Centrum Dobrego Państwa; Fair Play State; Bezpartyjni Samorządowcy (Lower Silesian Voivodeship); Poland 2050; Centre Union; Yes! For Poland; New Poland: Supported by: Committee for the Defence of Democracy; OK Poland Local Government Coalition; Silesian Regional Party (Note: The party was deregistered in 2023, and its members registered a party named Regionalists (Polish: Regionaliści) in its place in December 2024.); Social Democracy of Poland
- Colours: Blue; Yellow
- Senate: 65 / 100

Website
- Twitter page
- Politics of Poland; Political parties; Elections; a: PS2023 was described as consisting of right-wing, centrist, and left-wing parties.

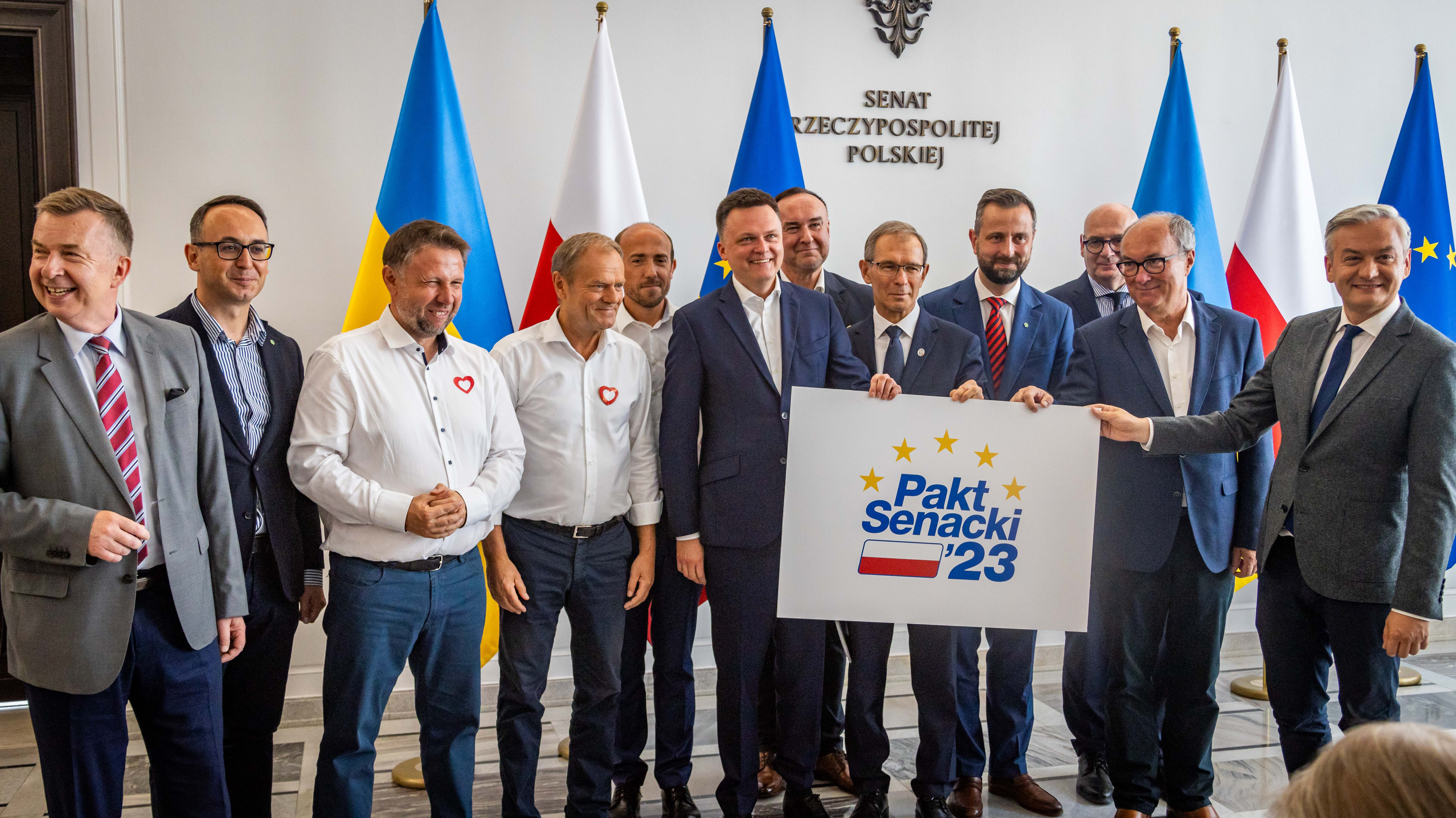
Announcement of the Senate Pact 2023

The Senate Pact 2023 (Polish: Pakt Senacki 2023, PS2023) is an electoral alliance among the Civic Coalition (KO), the New Left (NL), the Polish People's Party (PSL) and Poland 2050 for the 2023 Polish Senate election. The accord was agreed on 28 February 2023 by party representatives Marcin Kierwiński (KO), Dariusz Wieczorek (NL), Piotr Zgorzelski (KP-PSL) and Jacek Bury (Poland 2050).

The agreement assumed close cooperation regarding the conduct of the election campaign; in each electoral district for the Senate of Poland, the constituent parties backed one common candidate. Candidates recommended by parties to the agreement and political parties cooperating had the exclusive right to use the official logo of the coalition.

To implement the agreement, an organizational team was established, whose work is managed by a representative of Yes! For Poland–Civic Coalition Senator Zygmunt Frankiewicz. The team's task is to divide the electoral districts into individual parties to the agreement, prepare proposals for candidates for Senators of the Republic of Poland and develop a concept for conducting an election campaign. The first informal Senate pact was concluded before the parliamentary elections in 2019.

The Senate Pact 2023 was to also include the German Minority Electoral Committee, a political party representing the interests of German minority in Poland, located in Upper Silesia. However, the party refused to join the pact, stating that the program of the parties forming the Senate Pact 2023 was not satisfactory. In response, the New Left accused the German party of increasing the likelihood of Law and Justice victory. Despite refusing to join the pact, locally the German Minority Electoral Committee dropped out and endorsed Senate Pact 2023 candidates as long as they pledged to "actively expand regional self-government, develop the integration of the European community and work towards restoring German as a national minority language".

The alliance won 66 seats out of 100 in the 11th term of the Senate which will sit from 2023 to 2027. In the 2025 Polish presidential election, Senate Pact 2023 officially endorsed Rafał Trzaskowski.

== By-elections ==
Since 2023, there have been three Senate by-elections; on 21 July 2024, a by-election was held in constituency 13 (Włocławek) to fill the seat of Krzysztof Kukucki from New Left who was elected mayor of Włocławek in the 2024 local elections. The Senate Pact 2023 nominated Stanisław Pawlak of New Left, who successfully retained the seat.

Another by-election was held on 16 March 2025 in constituency 33 (Kraków IV) to fill the seat of Bogdan Klich of Civic Coalition, who resigned from office to assume a diplomatic post. The Senate Pact nominated Monika Piątkowska of Civic Coalition to hold the seat; however, a part of the pact, Poland 2050, refused to endorse her. Piątkowska retained the seat, although by a significantly lower margin. Given the lack of support from Poland 2050, challenge from a left-wing party Razem (former member of the Senate Pact), and Piątkowska's underperformance, Onet described the by-election as a "bittersweet victory" for the Civic Coalition.

On 24 August 2026, Mirosław Różański of New Poland – Centre, died. A by-election in the constituency Różański represented, 20 (Zielona Góra), was scheduled to take place on 22 November. The by-election caused a conflict within the coalition, as Różański was elected from the list of Poland 2050 before leaving the party and joining New Poland – Centre. Poland 2050 insisted that the seat left vacant by Różański should therefore be contested by them, and already proposed Izabela Ziętka as its candidate. The party warned that the pact nominating someone else would be seen by Poland 2050 as de facto dissolution of the pact. However, on 3 October, the pact reached an agreement to nominate Różański's widowed wife, Zdzisława Różańska, as the candidate.

== Ideology ==
The Senate Pact 2023 is considered to consist of left-wing, centrist, and right-wing parties. It has been described as liberal by the Sustainable Governance Indicators. The CEC group described the Senate Pact as a "far more politically diverse group" than any other alliances that contested Senate elections in Poland. According to Polish political scientist Bartosz Rydliński, the Senate Pact 2023 was created under three general ideological positions - defending liberal democracy in Poland, restoring the independence of the judiciary, and maintaining Poland's presence in the European Union.

Rydliński noted that regarding "tax issues, social policy, women’s rights, LGBT+ rights, or the relationship between the state and church, it would be challenging, if not impossible, to find common ground", given the diversity of views amongst the member parties of the Senate Pact. He described the cooperation in Senate Pact as "characterised by understandable distrust". Nasz Dziennik wrote that the Senate Pact had "a single-point program — namely, to remove PiS from power". While led by the dominant Civic Coalition, the Senate Pact rendered the Civic Coalition "far more dependent on its coalition partners in the Senate than expected". Krytyka Polityczna wrote that the pact offered generous terms to left-leaning parties and candidates.

Despite having a broad goal of opposing Law and Justice, the Senate Pact did not manage to achieve unity of the PiS opposition in all constituencies, and faced challenges from the left, centre, and right. The left-wing Democratic Left Association declared that the Pact did not allow democratic negotiation of places in the candidates lists and fielded separate candidates. The far-right Confederation Liberty and Independence was the only major opposition party to be excluded from the Pact, and fielded separate candidates in half of constituencies. Bezpartyjni Samorządowcy, a minor opposition party, also refused to take part in the Senate Pact. Lastly, several candidates from Poland 2050 decided to breach the alliance and run alone, despite their party being a member of the pact. Several independent candidates refused to join the Senate Pact; the German Minority Electoral Committee also refused to join, but endorsed individual SP2023 candidates.

== Composition ==
Name		Ideology	Political position	Leader(s)	Number of candidates (2023)	2019 result		Number of seats at the end of the 10th term	2023 result		Current number of seats
Name		Ideology	Political position	Leader(s)	Number of candidates (2023)	Votes (%)	Seats	Number of seats at the end of the 10th term	Votes (%)	Seats	Current number of seats
Civic Coalition (KO); Koalicja Obywatelska Members: Civic Coalition (KO) (Note: At the time of the creation of Senate Pact 2023, Civic Coalition consisted of Civic Platform, Modern, and Polish Initiative as separate parties, along with the Greens and later AGROunia. In October 2025, these three parties merged together into a single party — Civic Coalition. Other members of the Civic Coalition alliance, such as the Greens, opted out of the merger and remained separate. See: Civic Coalition unification congress.); The Greens; AGROunia		Liberal conservatism	Centre-right	Donald Tusk	49 / 100	35.7%	43 / 100	40 / 100	28.9%	41 / 100	42 / 100
The Left; Lewica Members: New Left (NL); Polish Socialist Party (PPS); Labour Union (UP); Common Tomorrow		Social democracy Social liberalism	Centre-left	Włodzimierz Czarzasty (Note: Until 14 December 2025, Czarzasty was a co-leader together with Robert Biedroń.)	14 / 100	2.3%	2 / 100	1 / 100	5.3%	9 / 100	8 / 100
Third Way (TD) (Note: The Third Way was dissolved on 17 June 2025, but the Third Way Senate Group (Polish: Klub Senacki Trzecia Droga) continued to exist.); Trzecia Droga	Polish Coalition (KP); Koalicja Polska Members: Polish People's Party (PSL); Centre for Poland (CdP); Young Poland Association	Christian democracy Conservatism	Centre-right	Władysław Kosiniak-Kamysz	21 / 100	5.7%	3 / 100	4 / 100	8.1%	6 / 100	8 / 100
Third Way (TD); Trzecia Droga	Poland 2050; Polska 2050	Christian democracy Conservative liberalism	Centre-right	Katarzyna Pełczyńska-Nałęcz (Note: Elected in the 2026 Poland 2050 leadership election on 31 January 2026 after the resignation of Szymon Hołownia, the founder and longtime leader of the party.)	8 / 100	—		1 / 100	3.4%	5 / 100	8 / 100
New Poland – Centre (Note: On 18 March 2026, New Poland and Centrum announced the creation of a joint Senate group, New Poland - Centre, composed of 3 senators from Centrum, 3 senators from New Poland, and Mirosław Różański, an independent senator previously associated with Poland 2050. The members of the group confirmed that they remain in the Senate Pact 2023.); Nowa Polska - Centrum	Centre Union (Note: Centre was founded as a parliamentary group formed on 18 February 2026 by MPs and Senators who left Poland 2050. Its members declared that Centre will also become a political party. Its 3 senators left the Third Way Senate Group to create its own, the Centre Parliamentary Group (Polish: Klub Parlamentarny Centrum). On 12 July 2026, Centrum became a political party Centre Union, merging with the Union of European Democrats (UED), which was a part of the Polish Coalition.) (UC); Unia Centrum	Liberalism	Centre	Paulina Hennig-Kloska	8 / 100	—		1 / 100	3.4%	5 / 100	6 / 100
New Poland – Centre; Nowa Polska - Centrum	New Poland; Nowa Polska	Conservative liberalism	Centre	Zygmunt Frankiewicz	—						6 / 100
Yes! For Poland; Tak! Dla Polski		Regionalism; Decentralization	Centre-left	Rafał Trzaskowski (Note: At the time of the creation of Senate Pact 2023, the leader of the association was Jacek Karnowski, who resigned in September 2025 and was replaced by Rafał Trzaskowski.)	8 / 100	—		2 / 100 (Note: Zygmunt Frankiewicz also belonged to the Civic Coalition parliamentary group.)	3.3%	6 / 100	—
Independents		—		Tomasz Lenz (Note: Lenz was excluded from the Civic Coalition Senate Group on 11 May 2026, becoming an independent senator.)	1 / 100	—		2 / 100	0.7%	1 / 100	1 / 100
Total		—			97 / 100	45.9%	51 / 100	49 / 100	48.4%	66 / 100	65 / 100

Jan Maria Jackowski and Józef Zając, former members of the Law and Justice parliamentary group have been informally endorsed and the Pact did not stand in their constituencies.

== See also ==
- Third Cabinet of Donald Tusk
- 15 October Coalition
