= Pietrykowski =

Pietrykowski, feminine: Pietrykowska is a Polish surname. The Russified variant is Petrikovsky. Notable people with the surname include:

- Norbert Pietrykowski (born 1973), Polish politician
- Tadeusz Pietrzykowski (1917–1991), Polish boxer
- Zbigniew Pietrzykowski (1934–2014), Polish boxer
