= Marcin Skonieczka =

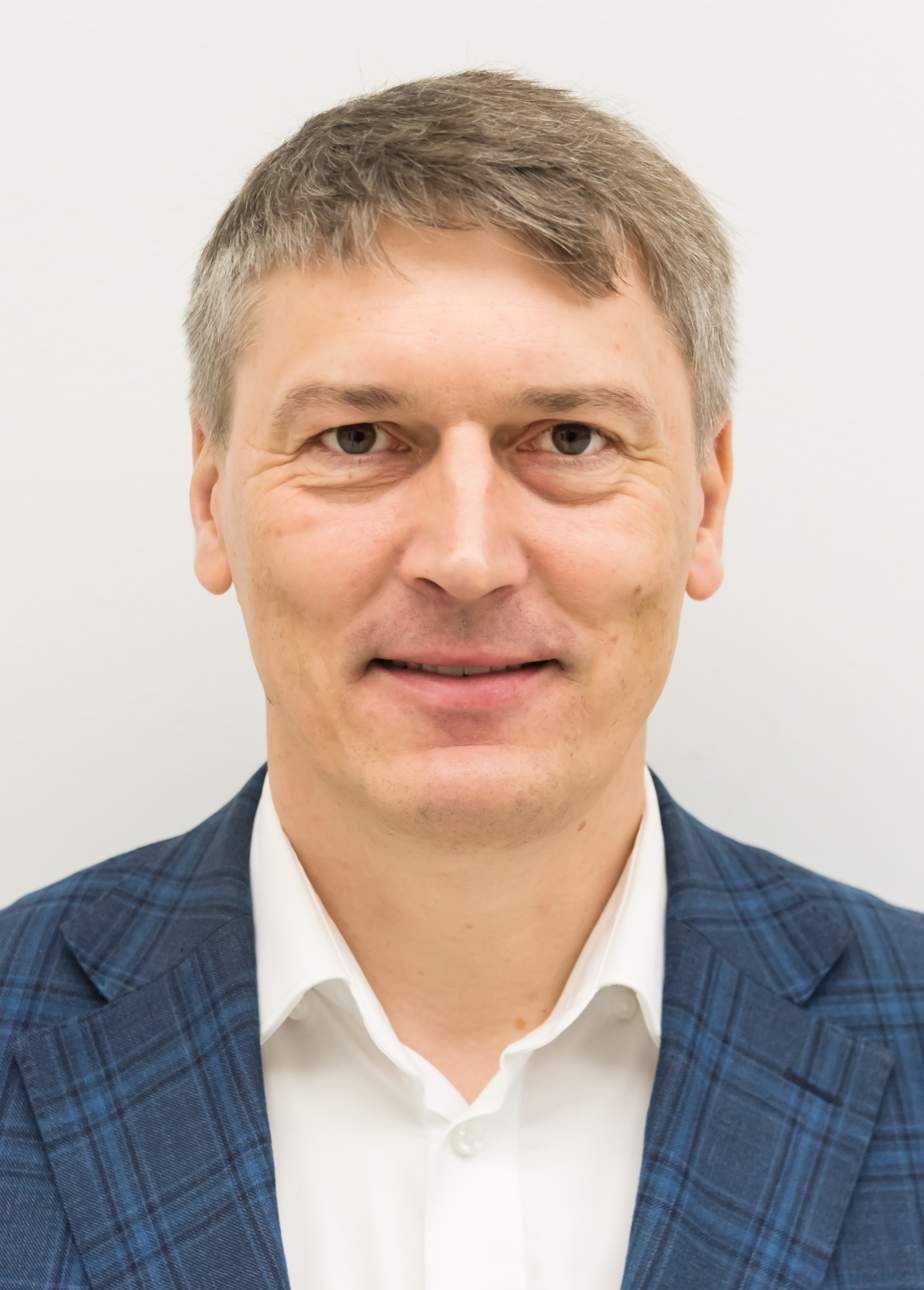
- Skonieczka in 2023

Member of the Sejm
- Incumbent
- Assumed office 13 November 2023
- Constituency: No. 5

Personal details
- Born: 9 November 1978 (age 47) Chełmno, Poland
- Party: Centre (currently)

Marcin Seweryn Skonieczka (born 9 November 1978 in Chełmno) is a Polish politician, former wójt of gmina Płużnica (2010–2023) and a poseł for the 10th term Sejm (od 2023).

== Biography ==
He is a graduate of the Poznań University of Economics. He co-founded and led a local association engaged in development of his native gmina Płużnica.

In 2006 he unsuccessfully ran to become the wójt of Płużnica, losing in the second round. However, he was victorious in the elections for the position in 2010. He was reelected in 2014 and 2018. In 2019 he unsuccessfully ran for a seat in the Sejm on the list of the Civic Coalition in the Toruń district, earning 3983 votes.

He later joined Poland 2050 of Szymon Hołownia, becoming a secretary of the party in the Kujawsko-Pomorskie region. In 2023 he was elected as a poseł in the Toruń district, starting on the list of the Third Way (Poland 2050's electoral bloc), earning 11,864 votes. In the Sejm, he served on the Commission for Local Government and Regional Policy and the Commission for Agriculture and Rural Development. In 2024, he unsuccessfully ran for a seat in the European Parliament in the 2nd district.

In February 2026, together with several other parliamentarians, he chose to leave Poland 2050 and form the Centrum parliamentary group.

== Election results ==
=== Nationwide elections ===
Year	Electoral committee	Election	District	Result
2019	Civic Coalition	9th term Sejm	5	3,983 (0.88%) ✗
2023	Third Way	10th term Sejm	5	11,864 (2.21%) ✓
2024	Third Way	10th term European Parliament	2	3,959 (0.73%) ✗
