= Grzegorz Fedorowicz =

Polish politician and prison service colonel (born 1967)

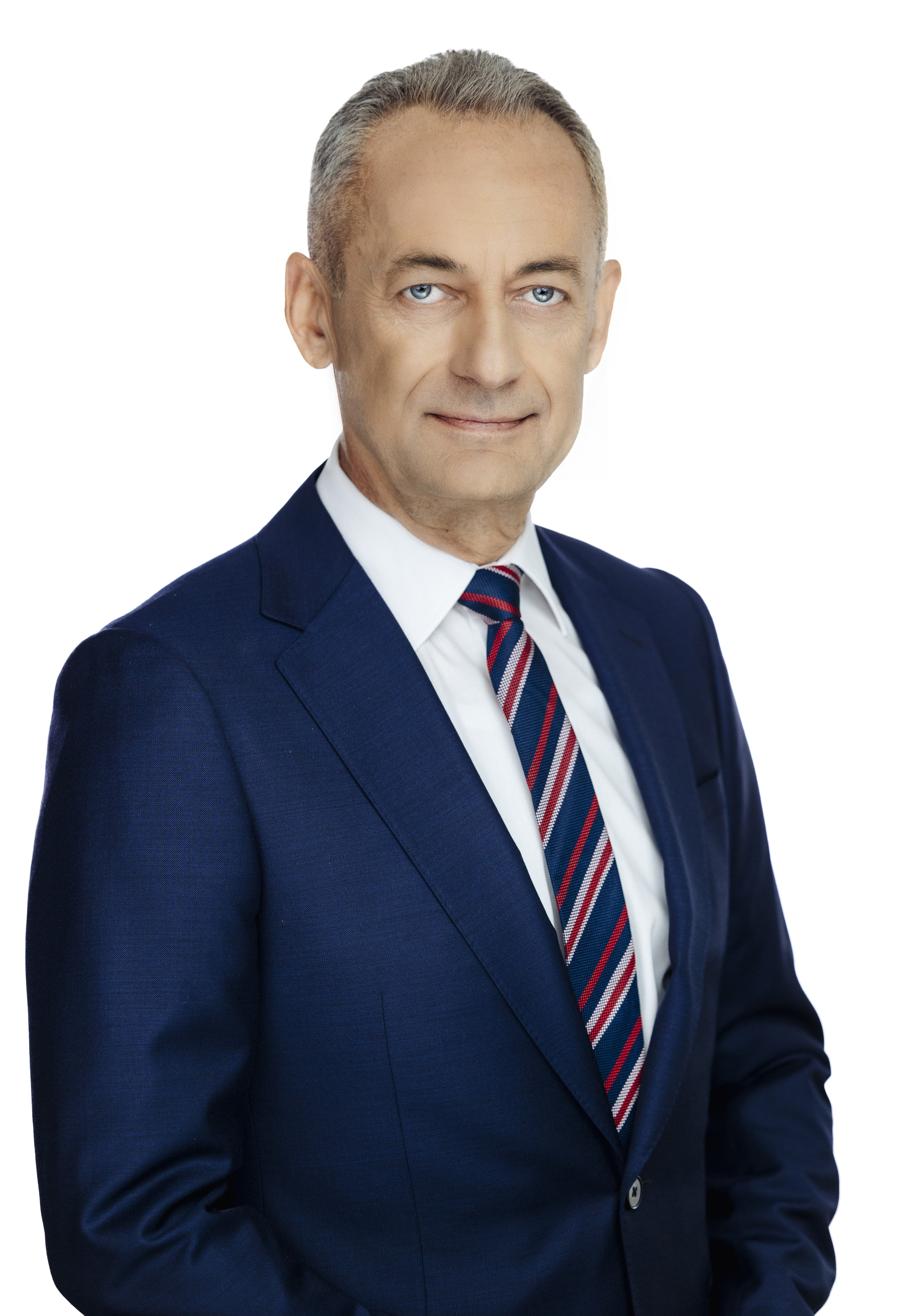
- Grzegorz Fedorowicz in 2023

Member of the Senate
- Incumbent
- Assumed office 12 November 2023
- Constituency: Constituency no. 92

Personal details
- Born: Grzegorz Fedorowicz; 26 March 1967 (age 59) Środa Wielkopolska, Poland
- Party: Poland 2050 (2023-2026); Centre (since 2026)
- Education: Warsaw University
- Alma mater: Adam Mickiewicz University in Poznań
- Occupation: Prison Service Colonel (1993-2020); Prison Service Deputy Director General (2017–2020)

Grzegorz Fedorowicz (born 26 March 1967 in Środa Wielkopolska) is a Polish Prison Service colonel and politician. He served as the Deputy Director General of Prison Service between 2017 and 2020, and he is a member of the 11th term of the Polish Senate.

== Biography ==
Grzegorz Fedorowicz was born to Eugeniusz and Stefania. He graduated from the Academy of Physical Education in Poznań and completed postgraduate studies in penitentiary science at the Adam Mickiewicz University in Poznań. In April 1993, he began working for the Prison Service as a junior educator at the Remand Centre in Poznań. In March 2000, he became director of the Remand Centre in Środa Wielkopolska. In March 2013, the Minister of Justice appointed him to the position of regional director of the Prison Service in Poznań. In July 2017, he took up the position of Deputy Director General of the Prison Service; he was dismissed from this position in February 2020.

He organised two solo cycling expeditions, which were charity events for sick and disabled children. He described the first one (from London to Września) in 2022 in his book A Thousand Miles to Września (Polish: Tysiąc mil do Wrześni). The second one took place in 2023 and covered the route from Lisbon to Września.

He joined Poland 2050 of Szymon Hołownia in 2023. In the 2023 Polish parliamentary election, he was a candidate of Senate Pact 2023 on behalf of the Third Way coalition in constituency no. 92. He won a seat in the 11th term of the Senate with 111,128 votes. He became deputy chairman of the Human Rights and Rule of Law Committee and a member of the Sports Committee. In February 2026, together with 17 other MPs of Poland 2050, he decided to leave the party and form a new parliamentary club, Centrum.

== Awards ==
- Medal of Merit for the Border Guard;
- Bronze Medal for Merit to the Border Guard (2014);
- Badge ‘For Merit in Prison Service’;
- Silver Medal for Merit to the Police;
- Honorary badge ‘For services to the Wielkopolska Province’.
