= Tomasz Lenz =

Polish politician (born 1968)

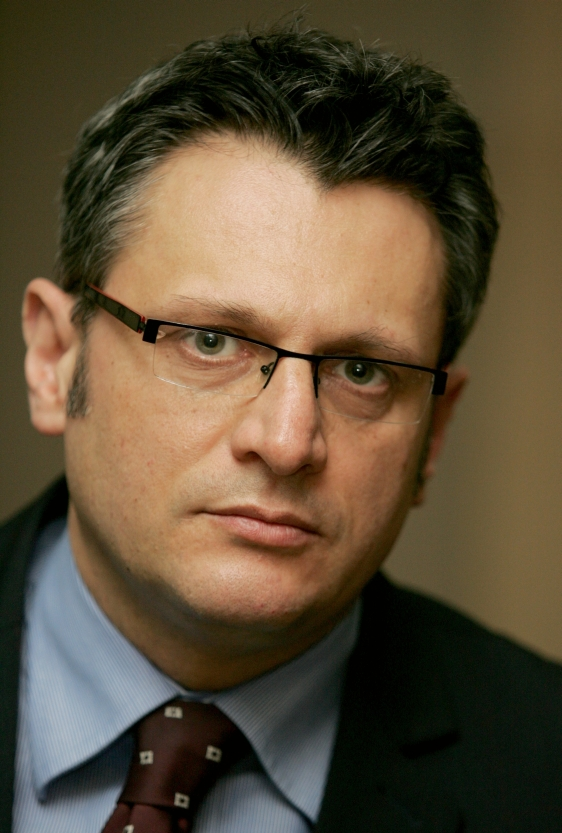

Member of the Senate
- Incumbent
- Assumed office 13 November 2023
- Constituency: 11 – Toruń

Member of the Sejm
- In office 25 September 2005 - 12 November 2023
- Constituency: 5 – Toruń

Personal details
- Born: 8 December 1968 (age 57) Mogilno, Mogilno County, Kuyavian-Pomeranian Voivodeship, Polish People's Republic
- Party: Civic Platform

Tomasz Lenz (born 8 December 1968 in Mogilno) is a Polish politician who currently serves as a Senator for the Toruń senate constituency and previously served as a Member of the Sejm for the Toruń parliamentary constituency from 2005 to 2023.

== See also ==
- Members of Polish Sejm 2005-2007
