= Izabela Bodnar =

Polish politician

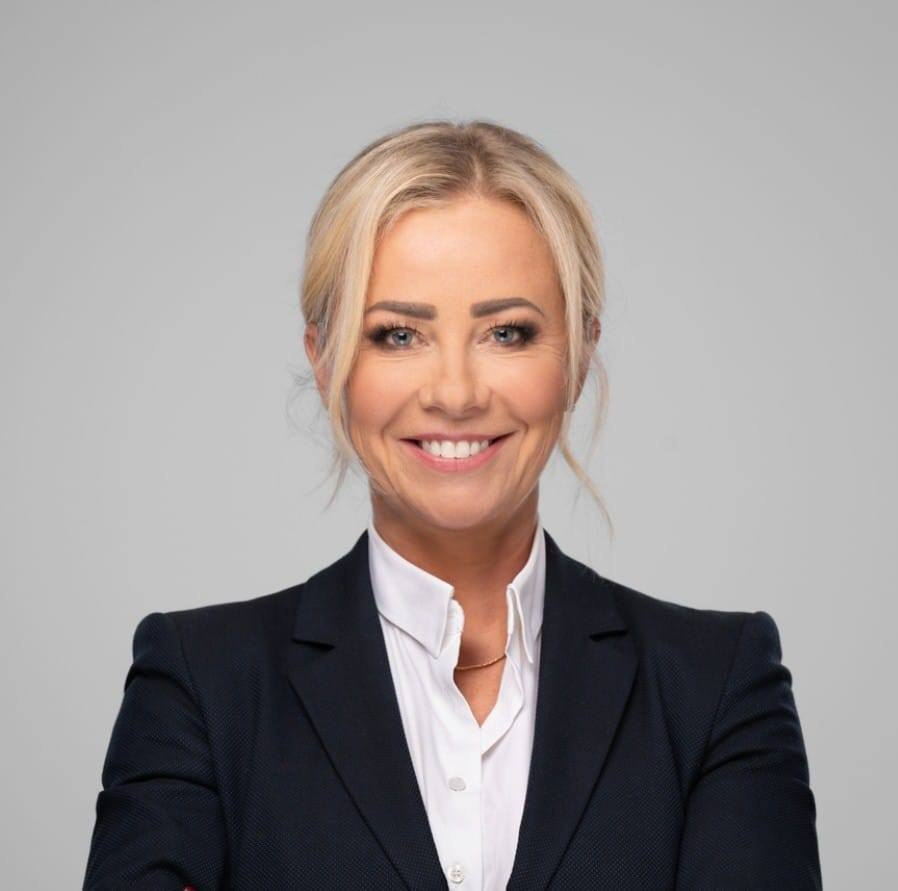
- Bodnar in 2024

Member of the Sejm
- Incumbent
- Assumed office 13 November 2023
- Constituency: 3 – Wrocław

Personal details
- Born: 13 February 1975 (age 51) Lubliniec, Poland
- Party: Poland 2050 (2020–2025) Independent (2025–2026) Centre (2026-present)
- Children: 2
- Education: Wrocław University of Economics
- Occupation: Politician; economist

Izabela Anna Bodnar (born 13 February 1975 in Lubliniec) is a Polish politician economist and member of the Sejm.

== Biography ==
She studied piano at the Academy of Music in Wrocław. In 2000, she graduated from the WSB Merito University in Wrocław with a bachelor's degree in banking and finance. She obtained her master's degree in corporate finance in 2002 at Wrocław Academy of Economics.

She joined Poland 2050 led by Szymon Hołownia. In the 2023 parliamentary elections, she was elected to the Sejm from the Wrocław constituency, finishing second on the Third Way coalition list and receiving 26,404 votes.
