= Ewa Szymanowska =

Polish politician (born 1978)

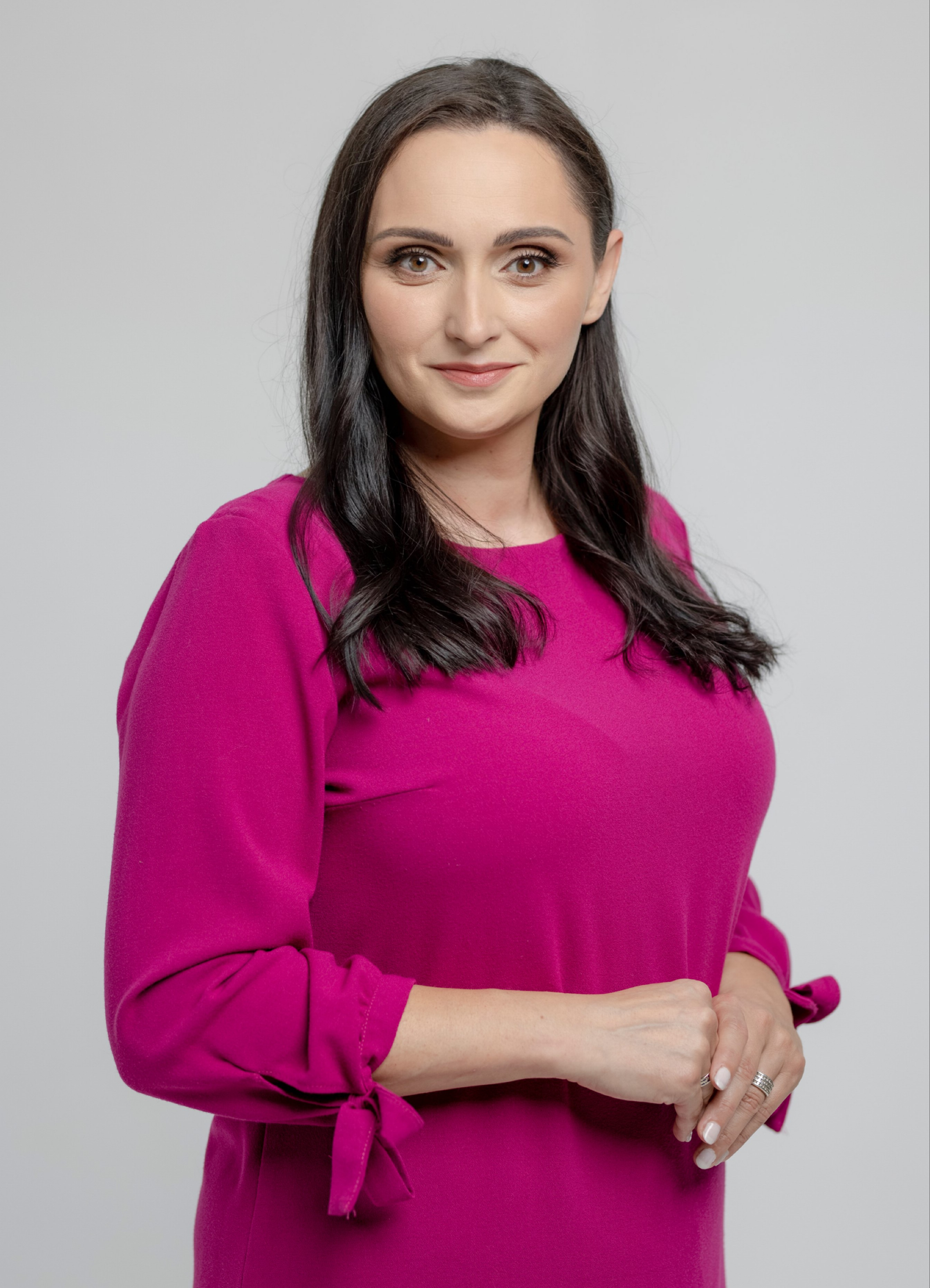

Member of the Sejm
- Incumbent
- Assumed office 13 November 2023
- Constituency: Łódź

Personal details
- Born: 30 May 1978 (age 48) Łódź
- Party: Poland 2050 (2021-2026); Centre (since 2026)

Ewa Joanna Szymanowska (born 30 May 1978 in Łódź) is a Polish politician, entrepreneur, and a poseł for the 10th term of the Sejm.

== Biography ==
She graduated from the Faculty of Management at the University of Łódź with a bachelor's degree in marketing (2000) and a master's degree in marketing and human resource management (2002). In 2009–2010, she completed postgraduate studies in public relations at the Faculty of Economics and Sociology of the same university.

Since 2001, she has run her own business. She has also worked in various positions in the banking and financial sector. She was also vice-president of the management board of the commercial law company Partnerzy w Biznesie. In 2019, she taught at the Academy of Humanities and Economics in Łódź, and in 2019–2020, she held a managerial position at that university. In 2020, she took up a position as a specialist at the Łódź Tourist Organization.

She became involved in politics as part of Szymon Hołownia's Poland 2050. In December 2022, she became chair of the party's Łódź region board and also took on the role of chair of the district circles in Piotrków Trybunalski and Sieradz. She ran in the 2023 Polish parliamentary election for the Sejm from the first place of the Third Way electoral list in the Łódź district. She won a seat in the 10th term with 26,185 votes.

In the 2024 Polish local elections, she ran unsuccessfully for the office of mayor of Łódź on behalf of Third Way. In the same year, she also ran unsuccessfully on behalf of Third Way in the 2024 European Parliament election in Poland from constituency No. 6, winning received 6,101 votes.

In February 2026, together with a dozen or so other parliamentarians, she decided to leave Polska 2050 and form a new parliamentary club, Centre.

== Election history ==
Election	Party	Chamber	Constituency	Result	Won?
2023	Third Way	10th term Sejm	no. 9	26 185 (5.74%)	Yes
2024	Third Way	Mayor of Łódź	—N/a	22,487 (9.27%)	No
2024	Third Way	European Parliament for Poland, 2024–2029	no. 6	6101 (0.80%)	No

== Personal life ==
She was born to Zbysław and Danuta Rymanowska. Together with her partner, she started a foster family.
