= Aleksandra Leo =

Polish politician and lawyer (born 1981)

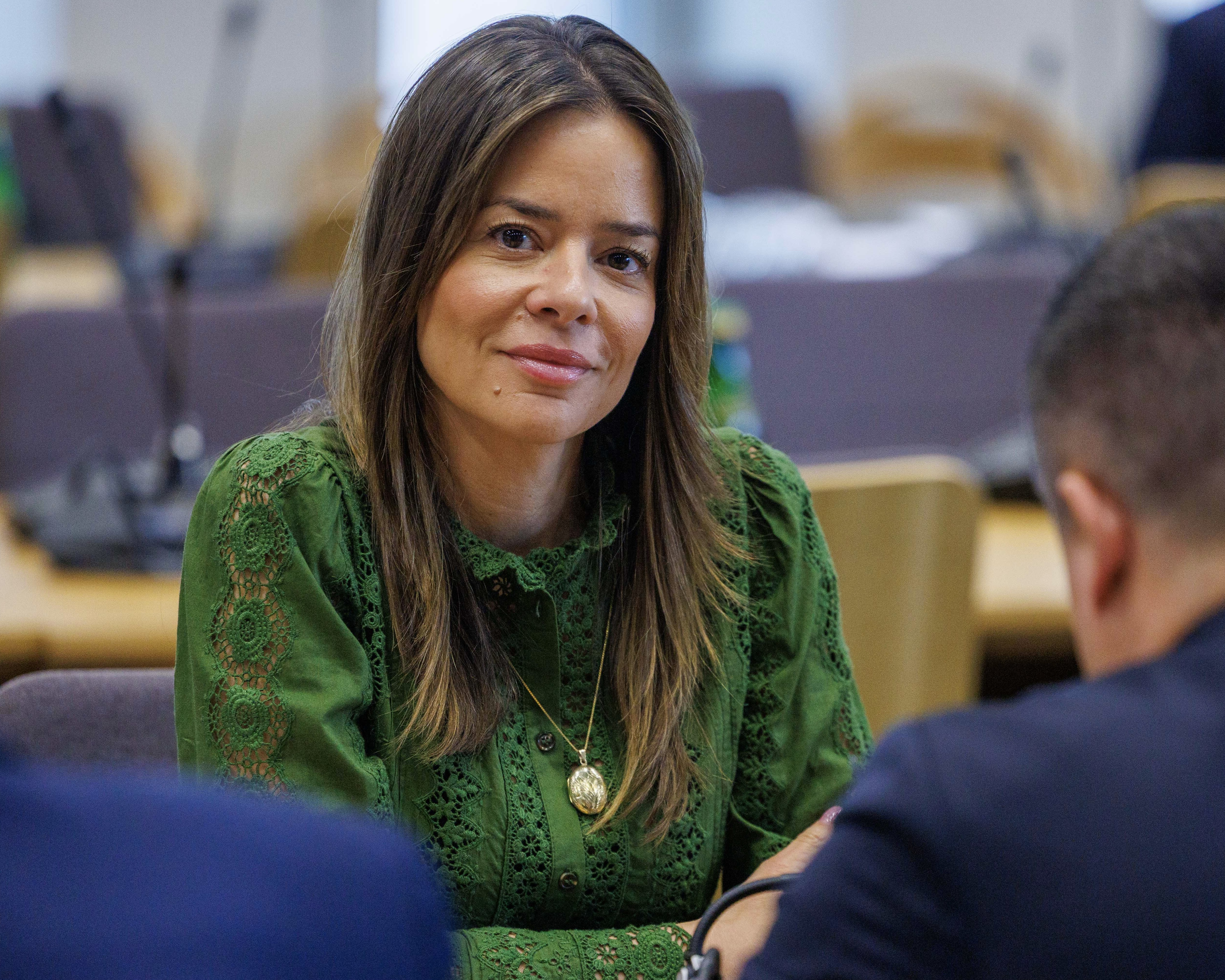
- Leo in 2026.

Member of the Sejm of Poland
- Incumbent
- Assumed office 13 November 2023
- Constituency: No. 9

Personal details
- Born: 28 March 1981 (age 45) Warsaw, Poland
- Party: Centre Union (since 2026)
- Other political affiliations: Centre (2026); Poland 2050 (2020–2026)
- Education: University of Warsaw; Collegium Civitas
- Occupation: Politician; lawyer

Aleksandra Maria Leo (Polish: [a.lɛkˈsan.dra ˈma.rja ˈlɛ.ɔ]; born 28 March 1981) is a Polish lawyer and politician. Since 2023, she is a member of the Sejm of Poland, representing the constituency no. 2 in Lower Silesian Voivodeship. Since 2026, Leo is a member of the party Centre Union. From 2020 to 2026, she was a member of the party Poland 2050.

== Biography ==
Aleksandra Leo was born on 28 March 1981 in Warsaw, Poland. She is a granddaughter of Włodzimierz Leo, and grandniece of Zbigniew Leo, soldiers of the Home Army, who fought in the Warsaw Uprising during the Second World War.

In 2005, she has graduated from the University of Warsaw with a degree in the commercial law, and later, also received degree in the history of modern art from the Collegium Civitas in Warsaw. She worked for RMF FM and TVN, where she was an editorial office manager for series Good Morning TVN. She is a member of the Society for the Encouragement of Fine Arts.

In 2010, she helped organize campaign for Bronisław Komorowski for the Polish presidential election. From 2010 to 2015, she worked in the Chancellery of the President, where she was a deputy chief of the presidential office, and the director of the first lady office. Later, she worked as an advisor and in helping organize outreach campaigns. From 2016 to 2017, she was a deputy director of the chairperson's office of the Bank Guarantee Fund. In 2018, she became office director in the Bronisław Komorowski Institute.

In 2020, she joined the Poland 2050, and in 2022, she became director of party leader's office. In 2013, she was elected to the Sejm of Poland, running from the constituency no. 2 in Lower Silesian Voivodeship, receiving 16,661 votes. In the parliament, she became member of the Culture and Media Committee, Legislative Committee, and Visa Affair Investigation Committee, as well as the deputy chairperson of the Women's Rights Parliamentary Team and the Capital City of Warsaw Parliamentary Team. In 2026, together with several other members of the parliament, she left the Poland 2050 party, creating the Centre parliamentary group. In May 2026, the political association Centre Poland was established, being represented by the parliamentary group. In July of the same year, it merged with the Union of European Democrats, forming the Centre Union political party. Leo also became its spokesperson.

== Personal life ==
She has a husband and two children.

== Electoral results ==
Year	Office		Party	Constituency	Votes			Result	Ref.
Year	Office		Party	Constituency	Total	%	P.	Result	Ref.
2023	Sejm of Poland	10th	Third Way	No. 2	16,661	5.15%	4th	Won	

== Awards and decorations ==
- Gold Cross of Merit (2015)
