= Elżbieta Burkiewicz =

Polish politician (born 1964)

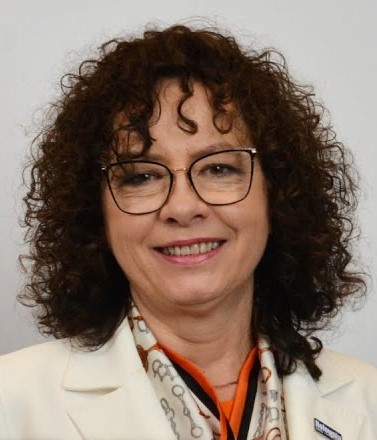
- Burkiewicz in 2025

Member of the Sejm
- Incumbent
- Assumed office 12 November 2023
- Constituency: Rzeszów

Personal details
- Born: 17 October 1964 (age 61)
- Party: Poland 2050 (2020-2026) Centre (2026-present)
- Other political affiliations: Third Way

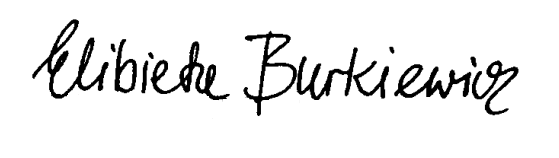
Elżbieta Burkiewicz

Elżbieta Burkiewicz (born 17 October 1964) is a Polish politician of Poland 2050. She has been a member of the Sejm since 2023, and was the lead candidate of the Third Way in Subcarpathia in the 2024 European Parliament election.
