= Mirosław Suchoń =

Polish politician (born 1976)

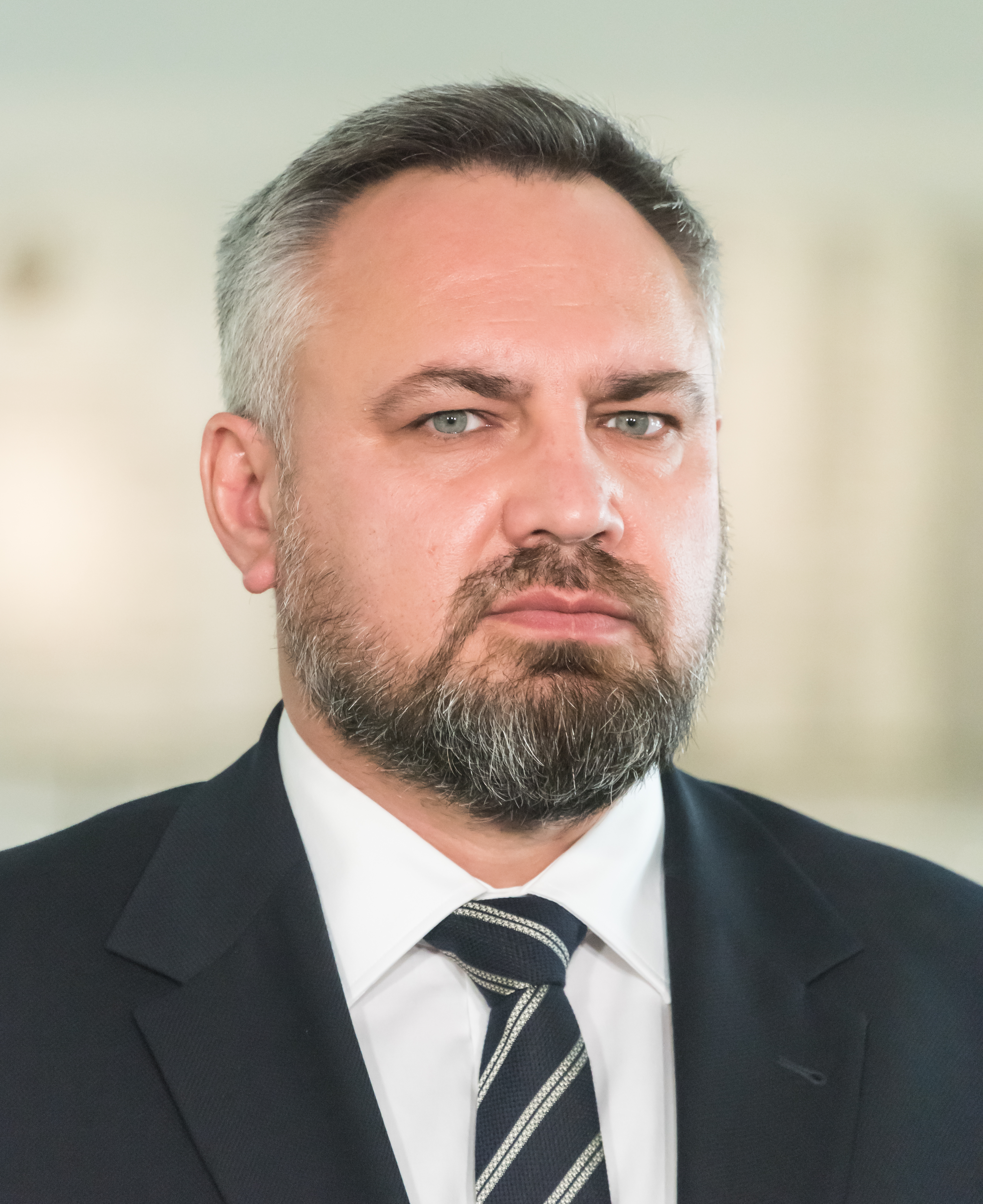
- Suchoń in 2022

Member of the Sejm
- Incumbent
- Assumed office 12 November 2015
- Constituency: Bielsko-Biała I

Personal details
- Born: 10 January 1976 (age 50)
- Party: Poland 2050 (2021-2026) Centre (2026-present)

Mirosław Suchoń (born 10 January 1976) is a Polish politician serving as a member of the Sejm since 2015. From 2023 to 2024, he served as group leader of Poland 2050.
