= Piotr Masłowski (politician) =

Polish politician

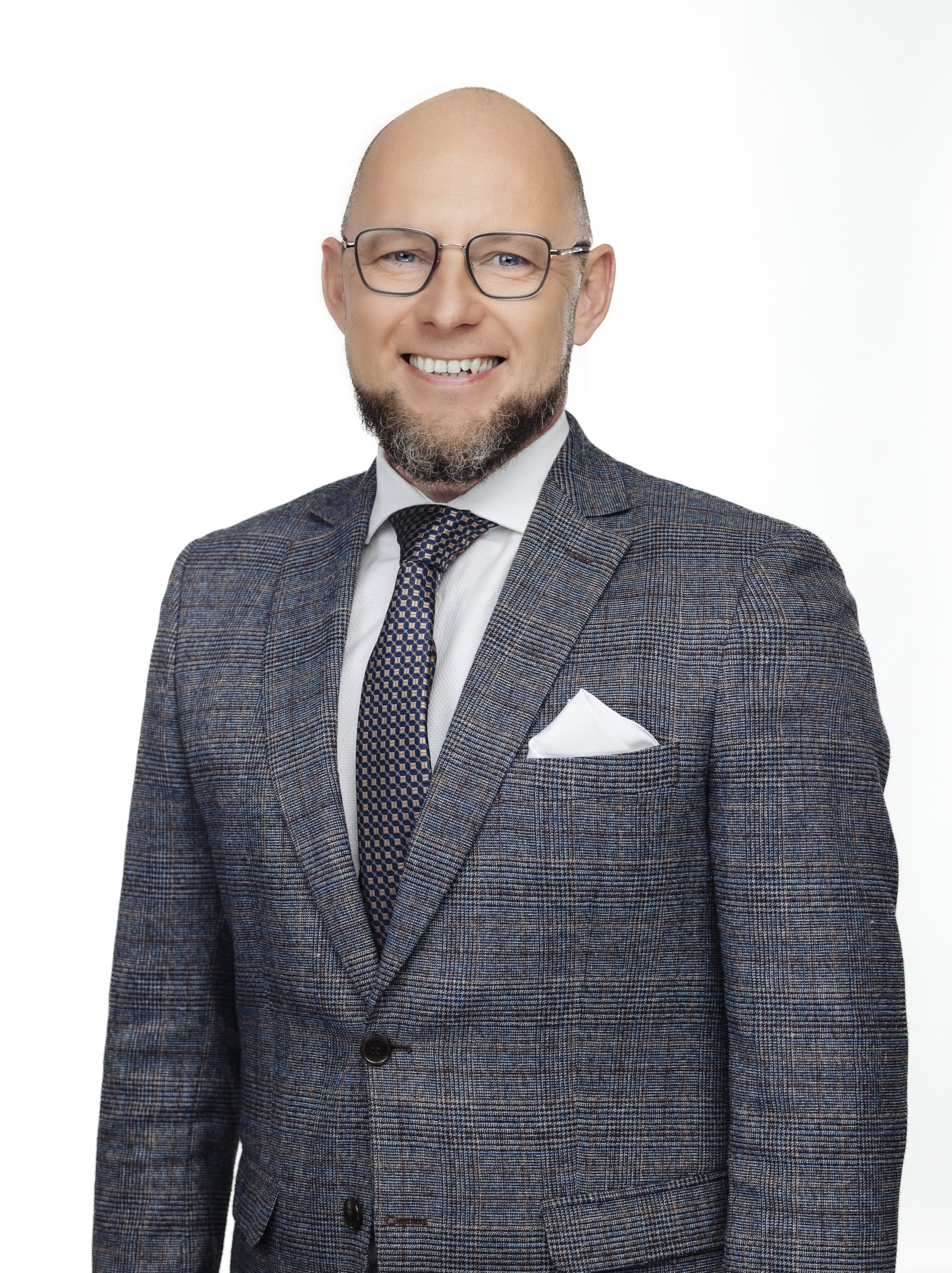
- Masłowski in 2023
- Born: 1 August 1977 (age 49); Wodzisław Śląski, Poland
- Political party: Centre

Piotr Paweł Masłowski (born 1 August 1977 in Wodzisław Śląski) is a Polish politician, political scientist and local government official, in 2014–2023 he served as the deputy mayor of Rybnik, becoming a senator of the 11th term Senate in 2023.

== Biography ==
Son of Zbigniew and Halina, born in Rydułtowy, which was then a district of Wodzisław Śląski. He graduated the University of Silesia in Katowice in 2001, earning a master's degree in political science with a specialization in local government. He worked as a railway signalman for PKP, for TUiR „Warta”, in the city office of Radlin and in Rybnik. He coordinated the project Sieć Wspierania Organizacji Pozarządowych SPLOT, he worked also in several positions in the Centrum Rozwoju Inicjatyw Społecznych CRIS in Rybnik.

In 1998 he unsuccessfully ran for office in the Rydułtów local elections from the list of the Freedom Union. In a 2013 by-election he unsuccessfully ran for Senator. In 2014 he ran unsuccessfully for mayor of Rybnik. In the first round, he lost with 5,485 votes (12,74%). He endorsed Piotr Kuczera who made Masłowski his deputy mayor. In 2018 he was elected to the Rybnik city council with 977 votes. He later joined Poland 2050 of Szymon Hołownia.

In elections to the Senate in 2023, he was a candidate of the Third Way; he was elected to the Senate, gaining 69,713 votes. In February 2026, along with other MPs, he defected Poland 2050 to found Centre.
