= Sejm Constituency no. 5 =

Parliamentary constituency in Poland

Toruń
- Polish: Okręg wyborczy Toruń
- Constituency for the National Assembly of the Republic of Poland
- Boundary of the Toruń Constituency in Poland for the 2011 general election.
- Counties in Kuyavian-Pomeranian Voivodeship: Aleksandrów, Brodnica, Chełmno, Golub-Dobrzyń, Grudziądz, Lipno, Radziejów, Rypin, Toruń, Wąbrzeźno, and Włocławek
- City Counties in Kuyavian-Pomeranian Voivodeship: Grudziądz, Toruń, and Włocławek

Current constituency
- Sejm Deputies: 13
- Sejm District: 5
- European Parliament constituency: Kuyavian-Pomeranian
- Voivodeship sejmik: Kuyavian-Pomeranian Regional Assembly

Toruń is a Polish parliamentary constituency in the Kuyavian-Pomeranian Voivodeship. It elects thirteen members of the Sejm.

The district has the number '5' and is named after the city of Toruń. It includes the counties of Aleksandrów, Brodnica, Chełmno, Golub-Dobrzyń, Grudziądz, Lipno, Radziejów, Rypin, Toruń, Wąbrzeźno, and Włocławek, and the city counties of Grudziądz, Toruń, and Włocławek.

== List of deputies ==
Deputies for the 10th Sejm (2023–2027)
Deputies	Party	Parliamentary group
Jan Ardanowski	Law and Justice	Law and Justice
Joanna Borowiak	Law and Justice	Law and Justice
Anna Gembicka	Law and Justice	Law and Justice
Krzysztof Szczucki	Law and Justice	Law and Justice
Mariusz Kałużny	Sovereign Poland	Law and Justice
Krystian Łuczak	Civic Platform	Civic Coalition
Arkadiusz Myrcha	Civic Platform	Civic Coalition
Tomasz Szymański	Civic Platform	Civic Coalition
Iwona Hartwich	Independent	Civic Coalition
Joanna Scheuring-Wielgus	New Left	The Left
Marcin Skonieczka	Poland 2050	Poland 2050
Zbigniew Sosnowski	Polish People's Party	Polish People's Party
Przemysław Wipler	New Hope	Confederation
