= Norbert Pietrykowski =

Polish politician (born 1973)

Norbert Jerzy Pietrykowski
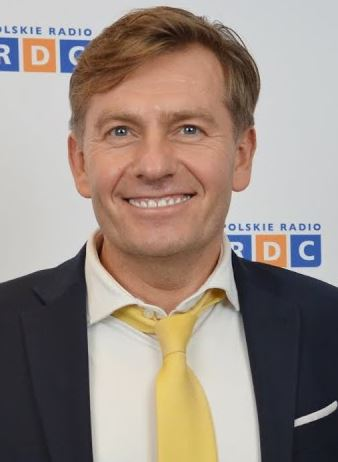

Member of the Sejm
- Incumbent
- Assumed office 13 November 2023
- Constituency: Bydgoszcz

Personal details
- Born: 17 December 1973 (age 52) Mława
- Party: Poland 2050 (2023-2026); Centre (since 2026)
- Education: Ludwik Rydygier Collegium Medicum in Bydgoszcz

Norbert Jerzy Pietrykowski (born 17 December 1973 in Mława) is a Polish politician, entrepreneur, and a poseł for the 10th term of the Sejm.

== Biography ==
With a master's degree in medical analytics, he graduated in this field in 1998 from the Medical Academy in Bydgoszcz. In 2011, he obtained a PhD in humanities at the Nicolaus Copernicus University in Toruń, writing a dissertation titled “The concept of aesthetic experience in the works of 20th-century Polish aestheticians”. He started his own business as part of the Vitalabo network of medical laboratories, which he co-founded.

He joined Poland 2050 of Szymon Hołownia. In the 2023 Polish parliamentary election, he won a seat in the 10th term of the Bydgoszcz constituency, running first on the list of the Third Way coalition list and receiving 27 596 votes. In 2024, he ran in the 2024 European Parliament election in Poland on behalf of the Third Way from constituency no. 2.

In February 2026, together with 17 other MPs of Polan 2050, he decided to leave the party and form a new parliamentary club, Centrum. On 24 February, he was elected the disciplinary officer of Centrum.

== Election history ==
Election	Party	Chamber	Constituency	Result	Won?
2023	Third Way	10th term Sejm	no. 4	27 596 (5.17%)	Yes
2024	Third Way	European Parliament for Poland, 2024–2029	no. 2	5666 (1.04%)	No
