= Prison Service (Poland) =

National prison service of Poland

- Służba Więzienna

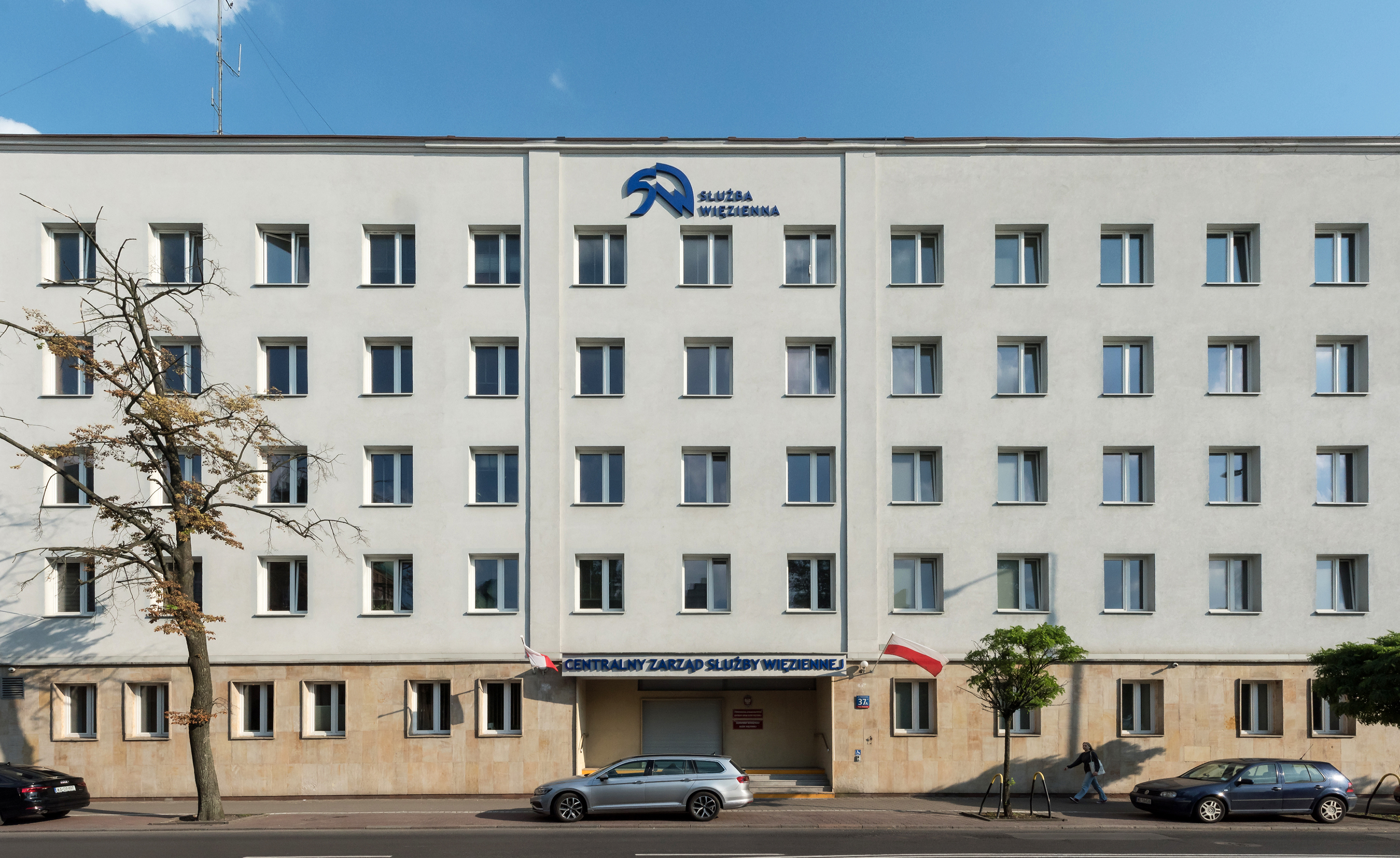

Executive Agency overview
- Formed: February 8, 1919
- Jurisdiction: Poland
- Headquarters: Rakowiecka 37a, Warsaw; 52°12′27″N 21°00′38″E
- Parent Executive Agency: Ministry of Justice
- Website: www.sw.gov.pl

Prison Service (Polish: Służba Więzienna) is the Polish uniformed, armed and apolitical formation performing tasks in the scope of executing sentences of imprisonment and temporary detention. It reports to the Minister of Justice and has its own organizational structure.

== History ==
The issue of prison organization was first raised shortly after the fall of the Republic of Poland in the Duchy of Warsaw and later in the Congress Poland. In 1807, Julian Ursyn Niemcewicz, after returning from the United States, presented a project for the organization of prisons based on the principles of isolation. In 1819, the "Project for the general and detailed improvement of the condition and administration of prisons in the Kingdom of Poland" was presented. In this project, the equivalents of today's officers are called caretakers (caretaker, economic caretaker, works caretaker).

Preparations for taking over the prisons located in the so-called Congress Poland from the hands of the occupiers were already undertaken in March 1918. This was a consequence of the transfer of the judiciary to the Provisional Council of State in 1917, and later to the Regency Council. However, the occupiers did not agree to this, wishing to retain control over the punishments imposed by Polish courts. On May 1, 1918, the Prison Department was established, later transformed into the Prison Section, with 24 people. A search for people who would later organize prisons in free Poland began. Those willing were placed among the prison staff of the occupying powers (34 people in officer positions, 117 in non-commissioned officers). Evening classes were organized for candidates for officers, a draft law, regulations, internal regulations, staffing and budget for the future Polish prison system were prepared. The takeover of prisons by Polish authorities took place from November 1, 1918 (territories occupied by Austria) to November 11, when a spontaneous, although long-prepared action took place on that day. On the night of November 12, all prisons in the territory of the Congress Poland were already in Polish hands. The next units were taken over as the borders of the independent Republic of Poland were formed:

- December 27, 1918 – the area covered by the Greater Poland Uprising
- December 27, 1920 – the areas occupied as a result of the Polish–Soviet War
- April 6, 1922 – Vilnius Region
- November 1, 1922 – the area granted to Poland after the plebiscite in Upper Silesia and the Third Silesian Uprising.

In 1921, the Prison Section was transformed into the Prison Department of the Ministry of Justice. Due to the lack of officers of Polish nationality (the occupiers did not employ Poles in state service), training of new officers began. Persons of Polish nationality with military experience were accepted, and exceptionally also civilian specialists. Each newly accepted had to complete a six-month internship. Officers and officials received a uniform once a year, and a coat once every 3 years. Prisons began to be renovated, food rations for convicts were increased (2,400 cal, for working people 3,000 cal and for sick people 4,000 cal), central purchases were launched to provide appropriate textile materials, clothing and footwear for prisoners and officers. With the aim of resocialization and developing the habit of work in prisoners, workshops and farms were organized at prisons. Part of the earnings, after deducting the costs of additional food, dues to the State Treasury and administrative costs, constituted the so-called prisoner's profit paid upon release or enabling him to make purchases in the prison canteen (the so-called iron cash register, discharge papers). Prison hospitals, schools and a chapel were also established. The army transferred more facilities, and new prisons were built, including the prison in Tarnów, which was modern for those times. On April 22, 1923, the first prison officers Antoni Łapiński, Józef Kurowski and Henryk Ruciński, died while on duty, murdered during the escape of four convicts.

=== 1944-1956 ===
On October 4, 1944, the Head of the Public Security Department, in Circular No. 1, established the Prison Service. This day was the prisoner holiday throughout the duration of the Polish People's Republic. In the initial period of rebuilding administrative structures, pre-war regulations were adopted, including the Penal Code of 1932, prison regulations of 1931, and regulations from the draft of the new regulations of 1939. Since the pre-war regulations were insufficient in the new political situation, in 1945 instructions were issued on the treatment of prisoners. From the beginning of its existence, the Prison Service was subordinated to the VI Department of the Ministry of Public Security. Its officers took an active part in the activities conducted by the Investigative Department of the UBP, including the persecution and torture of prisoners for political reasons.

In the camps and prisons, the same methods of treatment were used against convicts as in the Soviet Union at that time. A network of 204 forced labor camps was created in the country, in which about 25,000 people died. The largest camp of this type operated in Jaworzno, a former branch of the German concentration camp in Oświęcim – KL Auschwitz S-Lager Dachsgrube. Its first commandant was NKVD captain Mordasow, followed by Salomon Morel.

In July 1954, the Decree on the Prison Service was issued. The name of this formation was changed and certain elements were added aimed at corrective action towards convicts. On December 7, the Ministry of Public Security was dissolved, the service was subordinated to the newly established Ministry of the Internal Affairs. It was not until November 1955 that the pre-war prison regulations were repealed by introducing new regulations. However, they quickly lost their relevance due to the political changes of 1956 and the transfer of the Prison Service to the Ministry of Justice on November 1, 1956.

=== 1956-1989 ===
Ranks of the Prison Service from 1956 to 1989

The tasks of the Prison Service changed after the transformation of 1956. The previous regulations, despite containing certain corrective elements, were outdated. In previous years, no one dealt with the rehabilitation of convicts due to the lack of funds, facilities, appropriate staff, and above all the political climate. A 10-year period of issuing a number of orders, directives and letters began, modified and verified in practice, ending with the issuance of new regulations. The repressive model dominated by political, ideological and military content was transformed into a repressive and formative model, and the dominant politics and ideology began to be abandoned in favor of psychosocial content and legal disciplines.

In 1966, a system of free progression was introduced in rehabilitation activities, including the introduction of semi-open and open prisons. In the years 1969–1981 (with difficulties after martial law), prisoner education was developed, various variants of alcohol treatment were implemented, experiences with the pass system were developed and ways of cooperation with society were sought, and cooperation with families was expanded in many prisons. From 1969, the prison administration became the body of executive proceedings. From 1981, during the Martial law in Poland the prisons were used to intern the Solidarity movement. Throughout this period, the prison system did not escape the political role assigned to it by the totalitarian state. Along with criminal prisoners, prisoners of conscience were also held in prisons.

On December 10, 1959, the Prison Service Act was issued, which regulated the functioning of prison officers for 37 years. This act was modified several times, and the most serious changes were the introduction of the military nomenclature of ranks in 1975, the expansion of the training system, and in 1983 the introduction of the ensign corps.

== Functions ==
The Prison Service performs its tasks according to the principles specified in the Penal Code. These include:

- Executing temporary detention in a manner that secures the proper course of criminal proceedings
- Protecting society from perpetrators of crimes held in prisons and detention centers
- Ensuring order and security in prisons and detention centers
- Executing detentions applied on the basis of other regulations and legal assistance under international agreements
- Conducting rehabilitation activities towards persons sentenced to imprisonment, primarily by organizing work that facilitates the acquisition of professional qualifications, teaching and cultural and educational activities
- Ensuring that persons sentenced to imprisonment or temporarily detained have their rights respected, and in particular humanitarian conditions, respect for dignity, health care and religious care.

== Weapons ==
The SW currently has Mossberg 500 ATP series bolt-action shotguns, Mosberg Flex 500 12-gauge shotguns, Mosberg model 53693 12-gauge bolt-action shotguns, B&T GL-06 40 mm incapacitating projectile launchers with Aimpoint Micro T-1 collimator sights, the Walther P-99 AS pistol, and the 9 mm PM-06 Glauberyt submachine gun. Since 2018, the SW also has had the Beretta ARX 160 automatic rifle.
