= Jacek Trela =

Polish economist (born 1956)

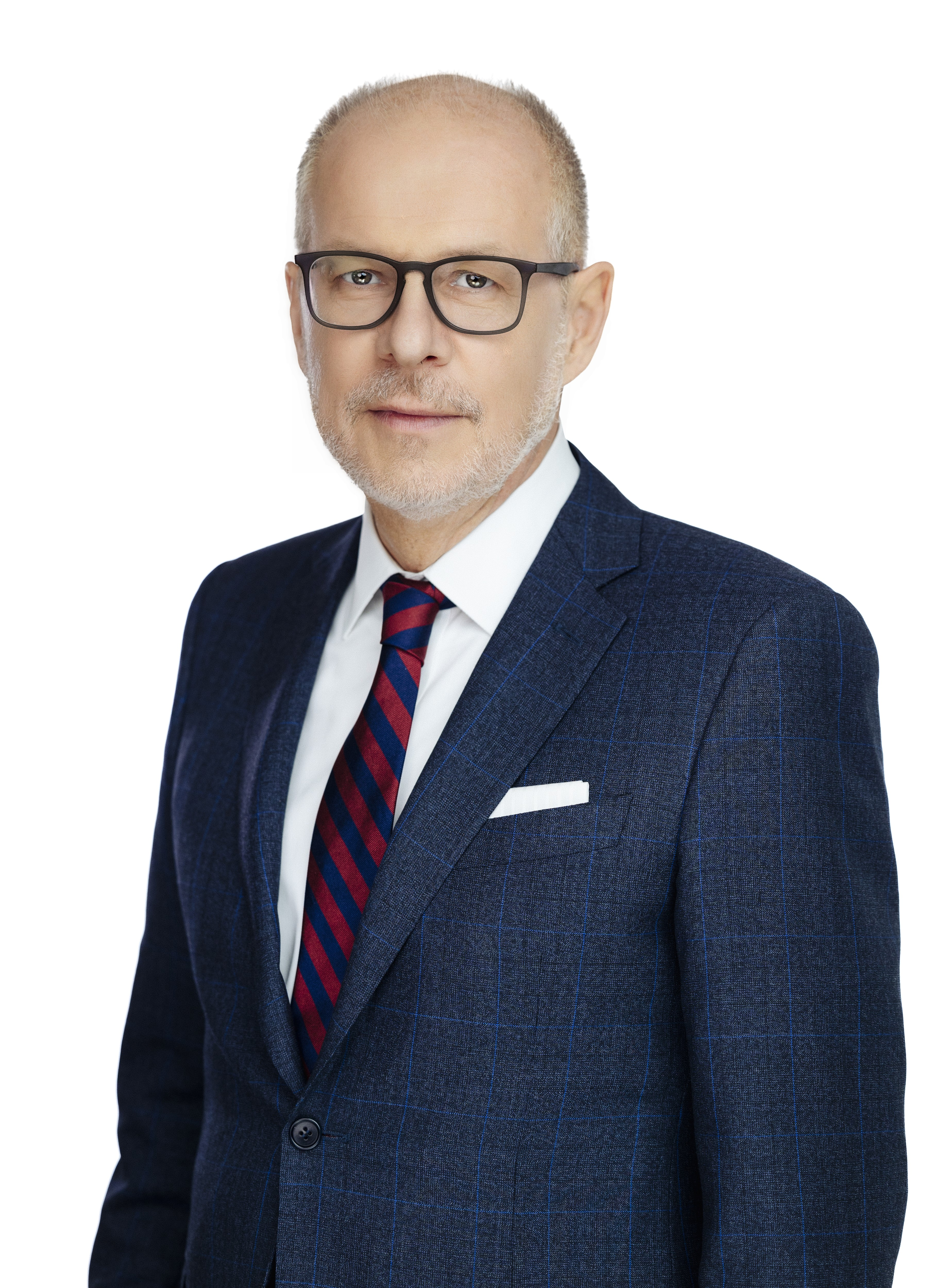
- Jacek Trela in 2023

Member of the Senate
- Incumbent
- Assumed office 12 November 2023
- Constituency: Constituency no. 16

Personal details
- Born: Jacek Trela; 30 August 1956 (age 69) Warsaw, Poland
- Party: Poland 2050 (2023-2026); Centre (since 2026)
- Education: Warsaw University

Jacek Szczęsny Trela (born 30 August 1956 in Warsaw) is a Polish lawyer, politician, and member of the 11th term of the Polish Senate. Between 2016 and 2021, he was the chairman of the Supreme Bar Council.

== Biography ==
He was born to Zdzisław and Maria Trela. In 1975–1979, he studied law at the Faculty of Law and Administration of the University of Warsaw. He worked as an arbitrator at the Regional Arbitration Commission in Warsaw. In 1982–1983, he was active in the Primate's Committee for Assistance to Persons Deprived of Liberty and Their Families. In 1986, he completed his legal training in Warsaw and was entered on the list of attorneys, beginning his professional practice in the same year.

He was a member of the District Bar Council in Warsaw and served as chairman of its Ethics Committee. In 2001 and 2004, he was elected dean of the District Bar Council in Warsaw, and from 2004 to 2007, he headed the Arbitration Court at the District Bar Council in Warsaw. In November 2016, during the 12th National Bar Convention in Krakow, he was elected president of the Supreme Bar Council. He held this position until March 2021.

In 2017, he became a member of the Social Codification Commission. In July 2021, he joined Szymon Hołownia's Poland 2050 party. In the parliamentary election in 2023, he was a candidate of the Third Way for the Senate in constituency No. 16. He won a seat in the 11th term of the Senate, receiving 93,316 votes (48.48%).

During the presidential elections in Poland in 2025, he was the election representative of Szymon Hołownia. In February 2026, together with 17 other Poland 2050 parliamentarians, he decided to leave Poland 2050 and form a new parliamentary club, Centre.

== Awards ==
In 2006, he was awarded the Distinguished Advocate badge, and in 2017, the Medal for Merit to Justice – Bene Merentibus Iustitiae.
