= Mirosław Różański =

Polish politician and lieutenant general (1962–2026)

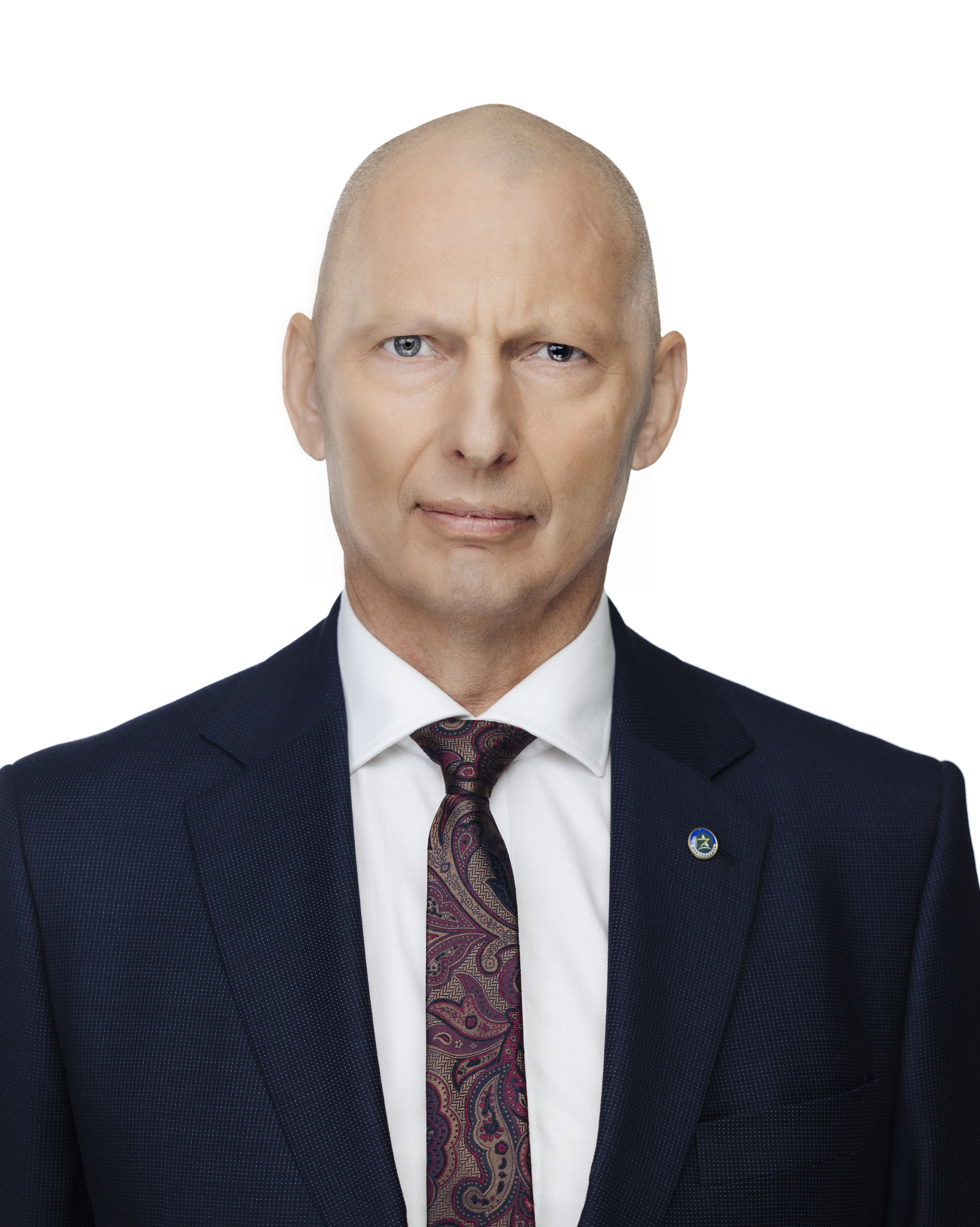
- Różański in 2023
- Born: 1 December 1962; Głogów, Poland
- Died: 24 August 2026 (aged 63)
- Children: 3
- Military career
- Allegiance: Poland
- Branch: Land Forces
- Service years: 1982 –2017
- Rank: Generał broni
- Commands: 42nd Mechanized Regiment; 34th Armoured Cavalry Brigade (chief of staff); 17th Wielkopolska Mechanized Brigade (commander, twice); Brigade Combat Group (VIII rotation, PKW Iraq); 11th Armoured Cavalry Division (commander); Commander General of the Branches of the Armed Forces
- Conflicts: Iraq War
- Awards: Order of Polonia Restituta; Cross of Merit; Military Cross of Merit with Swords; Medal of the Armed Forces in the Service of the Fatherland; Medal of Merit for National Defence; Medal of Merit for Fire Protection; Star of Iraq; Badge of Honour of the Bundeswehr
- Other work: Politician; Senator; Stratpoints Foundation President

Mirosław Różański (1 December 1962 – 24 August 2026) was a Polish military officer and politician. He served as a Lieutenant general of the Polish Armed Forces, was a doctor of defence sciences, and was the Commander General of the Branches of the Armed Forces in 2015–2017. From 2023, Różański was a member of the 11th term of the Polish Senate.

== Early life and career ==
=== Education ===
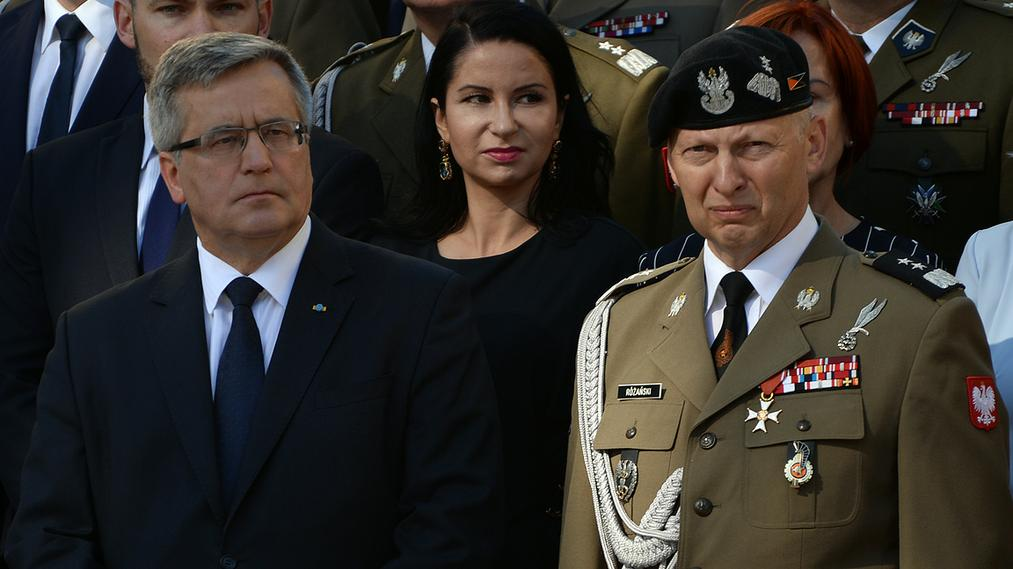
President of the Republic of Poland Bronisław Komorowski and Mirosław Różański during the ceremony of inaugurating the members of the Armed Forces General Command in 2015

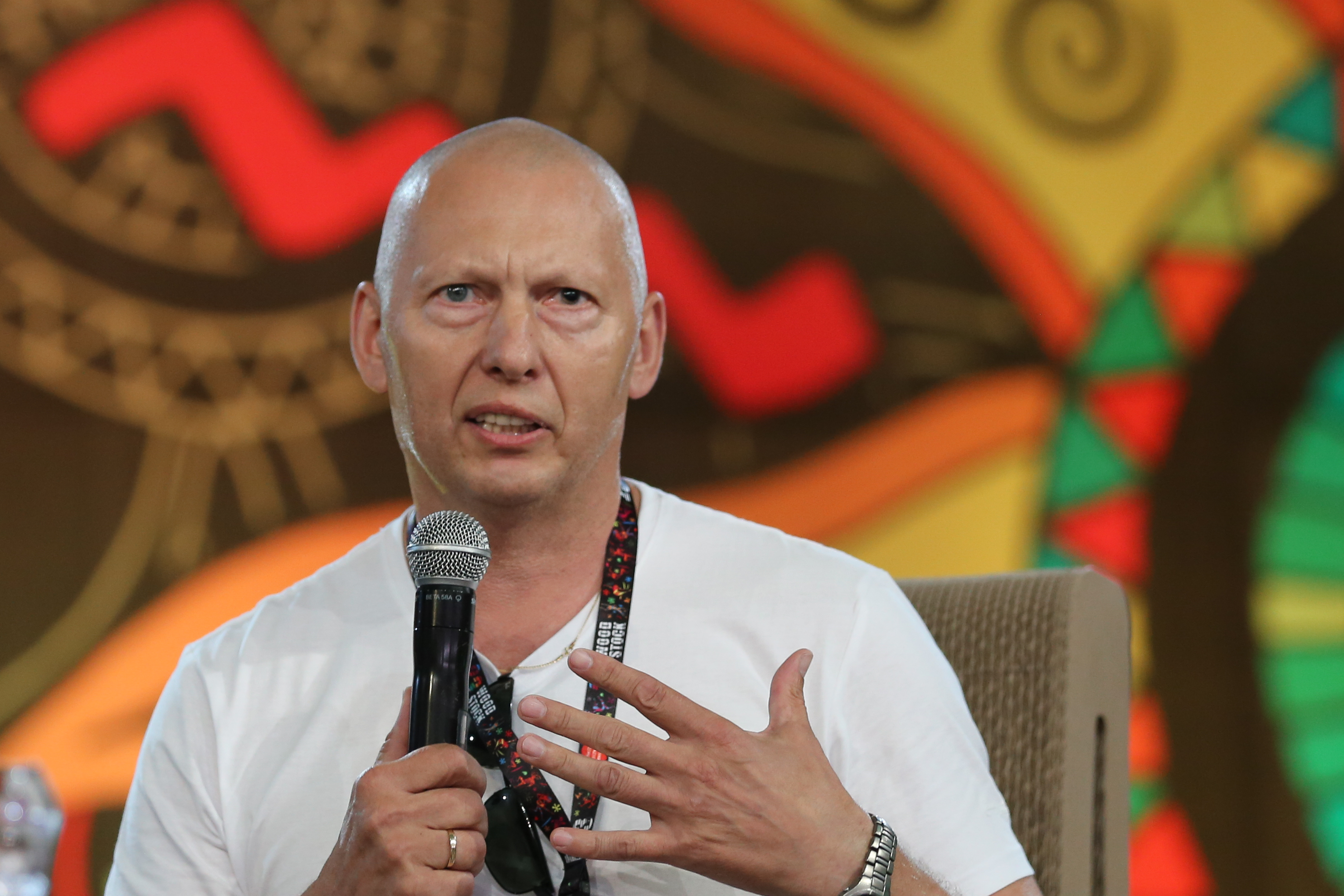
Mirosław Różański at the Pol'and'Rock Festival in 2017

Różański graduated from the Higher Officers' School of Mechanized Forces with distinction in 1986. In 1989 he completed the battalion commanders' course at the Centre for Officer Improvement. In the years 1992–1993 he completed second-degree studies at the National Defence University of Warsaw. At the same university in 1998 he completed a tactical-operational course, and in 2000 he graduated from the Postgraduate Study of Defence Policy (presenting a thesis entitled Professional armed forces as the basic factor of national security). In 2011, at the Faculty of Management and Command of the National Defence University, he obtained a doctoral degree in the field of defence sciences based on a dissertation entitled Effectiveness of operations of Polish military contingents formed from regular units in expeditionary operations.

=== Military service career ===
Różański began his military service in the 42nd Mechanized Regiment in Żary as a platoon commander. In 1987 he took the position of commander of a training company, and in 1989 he became commander of a mechanized company, with which he took part in the "Przyjaźń 1989" exercises – the first exercises in Poland observed by NATO representatives. In 1990 he became chief of staff of the training battalion, then was appointed commander of the 2nd mechanized battalion in the 42nd Mechanized Regiment. Later he became senior operations officer in the staff of the 42nd Mechanized Regiment. In 1994 he was sent for an internship to the combat training branch of the Silesian Military District. After completing it, he took the position of chief of training of the 34th Armoured Cavalry Brigade in Żagań. In 1996, in the same brigade, he became its chief of staff. In 1999 he was appointed commander of the 17th Wielkopolska Mechanized Brigade in Międzyrzecz, and in 2003 chief of staff of the 11th Armoured Cavalry Division in Żagań.

In August 2005 he received nomination to the rank of Brigadier general. In the same year he again took over the duties of commander of the 17th Wielkopolska Mechanized Brigade. He initiated and introduced a new model of sniper training in the land forces. He implemented the KTO Rosomak armoured personnel carrier into the armed forces and was responsible for the formation of the first fully professional motorized battalion (which took part in the 1st and 2nd rotations of the Task Force White Eagle). In 2007, as commander of the brigade combat group together with soldiers of his brigade, he participated in the 8th rotation of the Polish Military Contingent in Iraq. The group commanded by him was stationed at the base in Kut, took part in several operations against rebels, and also participated in humanitarian actions in Wasit Governorate. During the period of command by Różański, the brigade was three times (2006, 2007 and 2008) distinguished with the Honorary Badge of the Polish Armed Forces. In 2008 President of the Republic of Poland Lech Kaczyński awarded the general the national Flag in recognition of his merits. During the mission in Iraq he was decorated by the President of El Salvador.

In 2008 Różański took the position of deputy head of the Strategic Planning Department P-5 of the General Staff of the Polish Armed Forces in Warsaw. In August 2009 he moved to the position of commander of the 11th Armoured Cavalry Division. In the same month he was promoted to the rank of Major general. He formed, on the basis of the 17th Mechanized Brigade and division units, a European Union Battlegroup, which in 2010 became the first combat unit declared by Poland for the forces of the European Union. In the years 2010–2011 the 11th Armoured Cavalry Division commanded by him prepared the 8th and 9th rotations of the Polish Military Contingent in Afghanistan. In the years 2012–2013 he was director of the Department of Defence Strategy and Planning of the Ministry of National Defence. He worked in an international coordination team at the Ministry of Regional Development, and also served as plenipotentiary of the Minister of National Defence for the reform of the system of management, direction and command of the Polish Armed Forces. In the department managed by him, the Strategy for the Development of the National Security System of the Republic of Poland was developed and approved by the Council of Ministers. In 2013 he became commander of the Organizational Group of the Armed Forces General Command, which dealt with creating conditions for the establishment of the General Command from January 2014. He was then coordinating advisor to the secretary of state in the defence ministry.

On 9 June 2015, the President of the Republic of Poland Bronisław Komorowski appointed him to the position of Commander General of the Branches of the Armed Forces (from 30 June 2015), and in August of the same year promoted him to the rank of Lieutenant general. On 12 December 2016, Różański submitted a request for release from professional military service. On 31 January 2017, he ended his service as Commander General of the Branches of the Armed Forces and retired from active military service.

In July 2022 he was charged with failure to perform duties and exceeding powers in the matter of organizing the Radom Air Show air shows in 2015. The general did not admit to these acts, considering them politically motivated.

=== Social and political activity ===
In the years 1982–1990 he was a member of the Polish United Workers' Party.

In 2017 he founded the Stratpoints Foundation for Security and Development, in which he assumed the position of president. In 2020 he joined the staff of the candidate for President of the Republic of Poland Szymon Hołownia. He also became a member of the college of experts of the think tank Instytut Strategie 2050, associated with the Poland 2050 movement of Szymon Hołownia.

In the 2023 Polish parliamentary election he was a candidate of the Senate Pact 2023 on behalf of Third Way for the Senate in Senate constituency no. 20. He won the mandate of senator of the 11th term, receiving 104,047 votes (59.15%). In February 2026 he resigned from representing Poland 2050 in the Senate. In March 2026 he co-founded the Senate group New Poland – Centre.

== Personal life and death ==
Mirosław Różański was born to Bogusław and Helena Różański. He was married, and had three children.

In his later years, Różański was diagnosed with myeloma. He died on 24 August 2026, at the age of 63.

== Military service ==
=== Positions ===
- 1986–1987 – platoon commander in the 42nd Mechanized Regiment in Żary
- 1987–1989 – commander of a training company preparing platoon and section leaders and combat vehicle operators for the needs of the Silesian Military District in the 42nd Mechanized Regiment in Żary
- 1989–1990 – commander of a mechanized company in the 42nd Mechanized Regiment in Żary
- 1990–1991 – chief of staff of the training battalion in the 42nd Mechanized Regiment in Żary
- 1991–1992 – commander of the 2nd mechanized battalion in the 42nd Mechanized Regiment in Żary
- 1993–1994 – senior operations officer in the staff of the 42nd Mechanized Regiment in Żary
- 1994–1995 – internship in the combat training branch of the Silesian Military District in Wrocław
- 1995–1996 – chief of training in the 34th Armoured Cavalry Brigade in Żagań
- 1996–1999 – chief of staff in the 34th Armoured Cavalry Brigade in Żagań
- 1999–2003 – commander of the 17th Wielkopolska Mechanized Brigade in Międzyrzecz
- 2003–2005 – chief of staff in the command of the 11th Armoured Cavalry Division in Żagań
- 2005–2008 – commander of the 17th Wielkopolska Mechanized Brigade in Międzyrzecz
- 2007 – commander of the brigade combat group within the 8th rotation of the Polish Military Contingent in Iraq
- 2008–2009 – deputy head of the Strategic Planning Department P-5 in the General Staff of the Polish Armed Forces in Warsaw
- 2009–2011 – commander of the 11th Armoured Cavalry Division in Żagań
- 2012–2013 – director of the Department of Defence Strategy and Planning of the Ministry of National Defence
- 2013–2015 – commander of the Organizational Group of the Commander General of the Branches of the Armed Forces in Warsaw
- from 30 June 2015 to 31 January 2017 – Commander General of the Branches of the Armed Forces

=== General promotions ===
- Brigadier general – 2005
- Major general – 2009
- Lieutenant general – 2015

== Decorations and distinctions ==
=== Orders and decorations ===
- Knight's Cross of the Order of Polonia Restituta – 2011
- Bronze Cross of Merit
- Military Cross of Merit with Swords – 2008
- Silver Medal of the Armed Forces in the Service of the Fatherland
- Bronze Medal of the Armed Forces in the Service of the Fatherland
- Gold Medal of Merit for National Defence
- Silver Medal of Merit for National Defence
- Bronze Medal of Merit for National Defence
- Gold Medal of Merit for Fire Protection
- Star of Iraq
- Badge of Honour of the Bundeswehr – Germany, 2012
- Badge of National Honour "For International Cooperation" – Ukraine, 2023

=== Awards and distinctions ===
- Buzdygan, award of the magazine Polska Zbrojna
- Multinational Division Central-South Commemorative Badge
- Title of "Ambassador of the City of Żagań"
- Honorary citizen of the Gmina Grębocice
- Commemorative badge of the General Command of the Branches of the Armed Forces
- Honorary badge of the 10th Armoured Cavalry Brigade

== Publications ==
- Dlaczego przegramy wojnę z Rosją (co-author with Juliusz Ćwieluch), „Znak”, Kraków 2018, ISBN 978-83-240-5506-7.

== Bibliography ==
- "Mirosław Różański". stratpoints.pl. Archived from the original on 2 November 2023.
- "Dowódca 11 Lubuskiej Dywizji Kawalerii Pancernej: gen. dyw. Mirosław Różański". 11ldkpanc.mil.pl. 3 August 2009. Archived from the original on 25 July 2011.
- "Prezydent wręczył awanse generalskie oraz odznaczenia". bbn.gov.pl (in Polish). 1 August 2015.
- "Dowódca Generalny RSZ: gen. broni Mirosław Różański". dgrsz.mon.gov.pl. Archived from the original on 2 October 2015.
