= Zygmunt Frankiewicz =

Polish politician (born 1955)

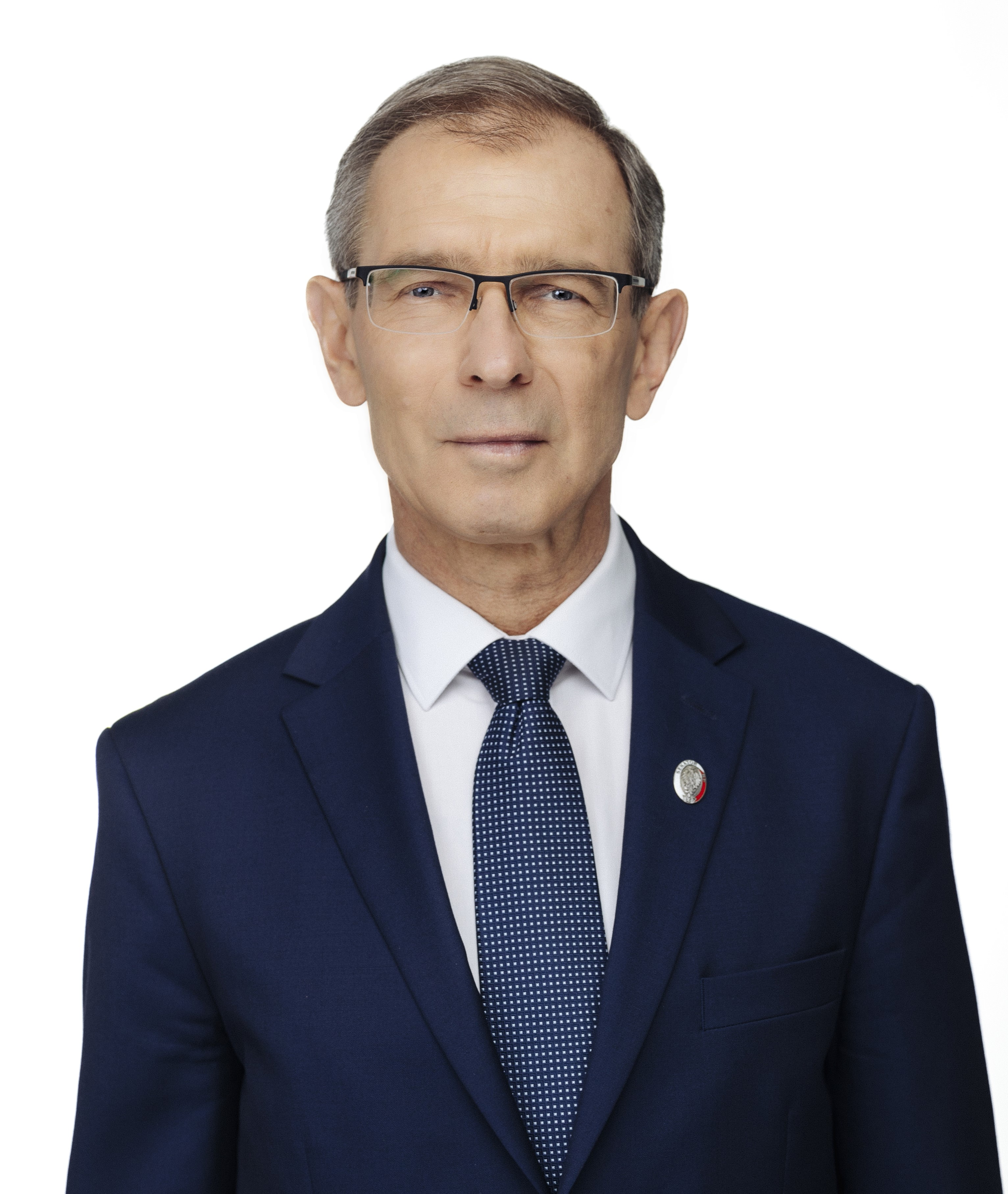

Member of the Senate of Poland

Personal details
- Born: 19 June 1955 (age 70)

Zygmunt Frankiewicz (born 19 June 1955) is a Polish politician. He was elected to the Senate of Poland (10th term) representing the constituency of Katowice. He was also elected to the 11th term. He is the chairman of the party New Poland.
