= Opinion polling on the incumbent Tusk government =

Surveying on government of Poland since 2023

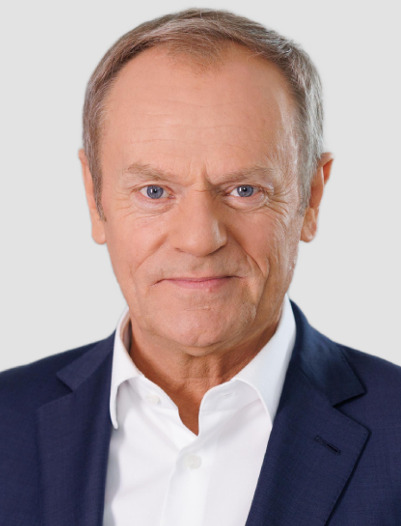
PM Donald Tusk in 2023.

The incumbent Tusk government came to power in 2023, elected in the 2023 Polish parliamentary election, succeeding the short-lived third Morawiecki cabinet. Throughout its period in governance, several polling agencies conducted opinion polls researching support for issues regarding its time in power.

== Prime Ministerial approval polls ==
=== Prime Minister Donald Tusk ===
Graphical summary of approval polls

Date(s) conducted	Polling firm/Link	Sample size	Approve	Disapprove	Neither	Don't know/Neutral	Net approval
1–11 Oct 2026	CBOS	1,028	33	54		13	–21
6–7 Oct 2026	SW Research / Wprost	820	38.4	46.1		15.5	–7.7
14–27 Sep 2026	CBOS	956	33	55		11	–22
21–22 Sep 2026	Pollster / "SE.pl"	1,029	33	53	13	1	–20
4–6 Sep 2026	United Surveys / WP.pl	1,000	37.4	54.3		8.3	–16.9
20–30 Aug 2026	CBOS	935	36	51		13	–15
2–12 Jul 2026	CBOS	938	31	58		11	–27
11–21 Jun 2026	CBOS	991	35	54		11	–19
7–17 May 2026	CBOS	1,041	35	52		12	–17
9–19 Apr 2026	CBOS	944	37	49		14	–12
27–28 Mar 2026	IBRiS / PAP	1,067	37	57		6	–20
5–15 Mar 2026	CBOS	1,012	37	53		10	–16
9 Mar 2026	IBRiS / Onet	1,000	38.2	60.3		1.5	–22.1
5–16 Feb 2026	CBOS	967	35	54		12	–19
8–20 Jan 2026	CBOS	938	36	53		11	–17
5–9 Dec 2025	Ipsos / Radio ZET (Note: Question wording: "How do you rate ... as a politician?")	1,000	27	51	19		–24
27 Nov – 8 Dec 2025	CBOS	948	36	54		10	–18
25–26 Nov 2025	UCE Research / Onet	1,021	33.1	42.6		24.6	–9.5
6–17 Nov 2025	CBOS	992	36	52		12	–16
2–13 Oct 2025	CBOS	901	33	57		10	–24
11–22 Sep 2025	CBOS	969	32	55		12	–23
19–20 Sep 2025	IBRiS / Onet	1,100	39.7	53.3		7.1	–13.6
13–15 Sep 2025	United Surveys / WP.pl	1,000	48.4	47.6		4.0	0.8
21 Aug – 1 Sep 2025	CBOS	917	32	58		10	–26
3–13 Jul 2025	CBOS	970	31	58		10	–27
5–15 Jun 2025	CBOS	971	32	58		10	–26
6–7 Jun 2025	IBRiS / Rz	1,069	35.1	57.8		7.0	–22.7
5–14 May 2025	CBOS	1,080	35	53		12	–18
5–8 May 2025	AtlasIntel	5,071	36.4	55.7		7.9	–19.3
3–13 Apr 2025	CBOS	1,030	37	51		12	–14
6–16 Mar 2025	CBOS	1,047	38	50		12	–12
6–16 Feb 2025	CBOS	965	37	51		12	–14
9–19 Jan 2025	CBOS	972	35	52		13	–17
20–22 Dec 2024	United Surveys / WP.pl	1,000	47.1	48.7		4.2	–1.6
28 Nov–8 Dec 2024	CBOS	915	36	54		10	–18
8–21 Nov 2024	CBOS	981	37	51		12	–14
3–13 Oct 2024	CBOS	1,025	36	50		14	–14
12–22 Sep 2024	CBOS	941	38	50		12	–12
14–25 Aug 2024	CBOS	939	35	53		13	–18
4–14 Jul 2024	CBOS	1,076	37	53		10	–16
10–20 Jun 2024	CBOS	1,055	40	47		13	–7
18–19 Jun 2024	IBRiS / Rz	1,100	41.6	40.9	11.3		0.7
20 May–2 Jun 2024	CBOS	1,015	40	48		12	–8
8–18 Apr 2024	CBOS	1,079	41	48		11	–7
7–17 Mar 2024	CBOS	1,089	40	49		11	–11
8–18 Feb 2024	CBOS	994	43	47		10	–4
11–21 Jan 2024	CBOS	1,015	41	49		10	–8

=== Will Tusk be a good prime minister? ===
Date(s) conducted	Polling firm/Link	Sample size	Good	Decent	Bad	Don't know/Neutral	Net approval
1–2 Dec 2023	IBRiS / Rz	1,067	31.2	22.1	41.8	4.9	–10.6

== Governmental approval polls ==
=== Third Tusk government ===
Graphical summary of approval polls

Date(s) conducted	Polling firm/Link	Sample size	Approve	Disapprove	Neither	Don't know	Net approval	Notes
2–5 Nov 2026	OGB	1,000	28.95	50.47	20.58		–21.52	Tusk's government
1–11 Oct 2026	CBOS	1,028	31	43	22	4	–12	Tusk's government
1–7 Oct 2026	OGB	1,000	26.7	53.6	19.7		–26.9	Tusk's government
2–3 Oct 2026	IBRiS / Radio ZET	1,072	42.1	49.3		8.6	–7.2	Does Tusk's government serve Poland well?
14–27 Sep 2026	CBOS	956	33	45	20	3	–22	Tusk's government
Sep 2026	Pollster / "SE.pl"	–	19	53	16	2	–34	Tusk's government since its inauguration
18–22 Sep 2026	OGB	1,000	27.8	49.2	23.0		–21.4	Tusk's government
20–30 Aug 2026	CBOS	935	32	40	24	4	–8	Tusk's government
5–12 Aug 2026	OGB	1,000	26.91	53.16	19.93		–26.25	Tusk's government
28–29 Jul 2026	SW Research / Zero.pl	806	33.6	49.9		17.0	–16.3	Tusk's government
24–25 Jul 2026	United Surveys / WP.pl	1,000	35.9	58.0		6.1	–19.6	Tusk's government
2–12 Jul 2026	CBOS	938	29	48	21	2	–19	Tusk's government
8 Jul 2026	SW Research / Onet	809	27.4	51.0		21.6	–23.6	Tusk's government
11–21 Jun 2026	CBOS	991	32	42	23	3	–10	Tusk's government
28–29 May 2026	Pollster / "SE.pl"	1,057	33	54		13	–21	Tusk's government
7–17 May 2026	CBOS	1,041	33	42	21	4	–9	Tusk's government
28 Apr – 11 May 2026	OGB	1,000	30.1	45.8	24.1		–15.7	Tusk's government
16–27 Apr 2026	OGB	1,000	29.4	51.1	19.5		–21.7	Tusk's government
9–19 Apr 2026	CBOS	944	35	39	22	4	–4	Tusk's government
8–13 Apr 2026	IBRiS / Polsat News	1,000	41.1	52.6		6.4	–11.5	Tusk's government
11–16 Mar 2026	OGB	1,000	31.14	49.03	19.83		–17.89	Tusk's government
5–15 Mar 2026	CBOS	1,012	33	42	21	4	–9	Tusk's government
5–16 Feb 2026	CBOS	967	34	41	22	3	–7	Tusk's government
9–14 Feb 2026	OGB	1,000	30.0	47.2	22.8		–17.2	Tusk's government
8–20 Jan 2026	CBOS	938	33	42	22	3	–9	Tusk's government
12–19 Jan 2026	OGB	1,000	32.4	49.0	18.5		–16.6	Tusk's government
Dec 2025	Social Changes / wPolsce24	1,000	33	57		10	–24	The government
9–15 Dec 2025	OGB	1,000	30.37	53.09	16.54		–22.72	Tusk's government
7–11 Dec 2025	IBRiS / Polsat News	1,000	40.9	51.8		7.4	–8.5	Tusk's government
5–8 Dec 2025	United Surveys / WP.pl	1,000	42.0	50.5		7.5	–8.5	PM and his cabinet
27 Nov – 8 Dec 2025	CBOS	948	33	42	23	2	–9	Tusk's government
25–28 Nov 2025	OGB	1,000	34.2	49.0	16.8		–14.8	Tusk's government
25–26 Nov 2025	SW Research / Wprost	844	27.9	39.2	25.1	7.8	–11.3	Tusk's government
6–17 Nov 2025	CBOS	992	34	41	22	3	–7	Tusk's government
10–13 Oct 2025	United Surveys / WP.pl	1,000	35.5	52.8		11.7	–17.3	Tusk's government
8–13 Oct 2025	OGB	1,000	24.5	51.8	23.7		–27.3	Tusk's government
2–13 Oct 2025	CBOS	901	31	45	20	3	–14	Tusk's government
11–22 Sep 2025	CBOS	969	29	46	20	4	–17	Tusk's government
2–9 Sep 2025	OGB	1,000	28.2	50.6	21.2		–22.4	Tusk's government
21 Aug–1 Sep 2025	CBOS	917	30	46	22	2	–16	Tusk's government
6–13 Aug 2025	OGB	1,000	23.5	55.6	20.9		–32.1	Tusk's government
3–13 Jul 2025	CBOS	970	32	48	17	3	–16	Tusk's government
4–11 Jul 2025	OGB	1,000	27.0	50.4	22.6		–23.4	Tusk's government
5–15 Jun 2025	CBOS	971	32	47	19	2	–15	Tusk's government
22–24 May 2025	OGB	800	33.18	46.76	20.06		–13.58	Tusk's government
5–14 May 2025	CBOS	1,080	32	44	20	4	–12	Tusk's government
5–8 May 2025	AtlasIntel	5,071	35.9	55.2		8.8	–19.3	
3–13 Apr 2025	CBOS	1,030	34	40	22	4	–6	Tusk's government
6–16 Mar 2025	CBOS	1,047	36	38	23	3	–2	Tusk's government
17–21 Feb 2025	Opinia24 / RMF FM	972	31	57		12	–26	Tusk's government
6–16 Feb 2025	CBOS	965	36	39	21	3	–3	Tusk's government
9–19 Jan 2025	CBOS	972	31	43	23	3	–12	Tusk's government
6–8 Dec 2024	United Surveys / DGP, RMF	1,000	39.6	51.4		8.9	–11.8	Tusk's government
6–8 Dec 2024	United Surveys / WP.pl	1,000	39.3	51.8		8.9	–12.5	Tusk's government after a year
28 Nov–8 Dec 2024	CBOS	915	32	40	24	4	–8	Tusk's government
8–21 Nov 2024	CBOS	981	34	40	24	2	–6	Tusk's government
Oct 2024	United Surveys / DGP, RMF	–	38.1	32.5	27.6	1.8	5.6	Tusk's government
3–13 Oct 2024	CBOS	1,025	34	39	24	3	–5	Tusk's government
11–12 Oct 2024	IBRiS / Onet	1,071	42.8	53.4		3.8	–10.6	The government
12–22 Sep 2024	CBOS	941	35	38	23	4	–3	Tusk's government
10–20 Sep 2024	IPSOS / More in Common Polska	1,504	27	39	34		–12	Government of KO, TD and The Left
14–25 Aug 2024	CBOS	939	32	40	25	3	–8	Tusk's government
4–14 Jul 2024	CBOS	1,076	33	40	24	3	–7	Tusk's government
10–20 Jun 2024	CBOS	1,055	36	36	26	3	Tie	Tusk's government
7–9 Jun 2024	United Surveys / DGP, RMF	1,000	34.5	32.5	32.2	0.9	2.0	Tusk's government
20 May–2 Jun 2024	CBOS	1,015	37	37	24	2	Tie	Tusk's government
10–12 May 2024	United Surveys / WP.pl	1,000	50.1	46.2		3.7	3.9	Tusk's government
8–18 Apr 2024	CBOS	1,079	35	37	25	3	–2	Tusk's government
19–20 Mar 2024	SW Research / Wprost	800	37.2	34.4	28.3		2.8	First 100 days of Tusk's government
7–17 Mar 2024	CBOS	1,089	37	38	22	3	–1	Tusk's government
8–18 Feb 2024	CBOS	994	41	34	22	3	7	Tusk's government
11–21 Jan 2024	CBOS	1,015	39	39	19	3	Tie	Tusk's government
12–14 Jan 2024	United Surveys / WP.pl	1,000	54.5	40.3		5.2	14.2	Tusk's government
12–13 Jan 2024	IBRiS / Rz	1,067	56.3	36.9		6.8	19.4	Tusk's government

== Ministerial opinion polling ==
=== Minister of National Education Barbara Nowacka ===
Date(s) conducted	Polling firm/Link	Sample size	Approve	Disapprove	Neither	Don't know/Neutral	Net approval
26–28 Sep 2025	United Surveys / WP.pl	1,000	39.1	47.6		13.3	–8.5
18–19 Jun 2024	IBRiS / Rz	1,100	30.9	37.7	17.9		–6.8

=== Minister of Minister of Funds and Regional Policy Katarzyna Pełczyńska-Nałęcz ===
Date(s) conducted	Polling firm/Link	Sample size	Approve	Disapprove	Neither	Don't know/Neutral	Net approval
27–28 Oct 2026	SW Research / Onet	800	19.2	31.2	34.2	15.4	–12.0
5–9 Dec 2025	Ipsos / Radio ZET	1,000	10	26			–16
18–19 Jun 2024	IBRiS / Rz	1,100	21.0	27.9			–6.9

=== Minister of Climate Paulina Hennig-Kloska ===
Date(s) conducted	Polling firm/Link	Sample size	Approve	Disapprove	Neither	Don't know/Neutral	Net approval
7–8 Mar 2025	SW Research / Zero.pl	833	24.3	34.7		41.0	–10.4
18–19 Jun 2024	IBRiS / Rz	1,100	20.0	40.2	22.1		–20.2

=== Minister of National Defence Władysław Kosiniak-Kamysz ===
Date(s) conducted	Polling firm/Link	Sample size	Approve	Disapprove	Neither	Don't know/Neutral	Net approval
22–23 Jul 2026	Pollster / "SE.pl"	1,061	41	31		28	10
15–17 Jul 2026	UCE Research / Onet	1,013	39.5	28.1	21.0	11.5	11.4
Jun 2026	SW Research / Wprost	–	42.4	34.8		22.8	7.6
10–11 Mar 2026	Pollster / "SE.pl"	1,013	63	37			26
5–9 Dec 2025	Ipsos / Radio ZET	1,000	24	35			–11
25–26 Nov 2025	UCE Research / Onet	1,021	39.1	27.8		33.1	11.3
4–5 Nov 2025	SW Research / Wprost	828	31.9	36.4		31.8	–4.5
18–19 Jun 2024	IBRiS / Rz	1,100	28.9	41.0	19.8		–12.1

=== Minister of Justice Waldemar Żurek ===
Date(s) conducted	Polling firm/Link	Sample size	Approve	Disapprove	Neither	Don't know/Neutral	Net approval
24–25 Feb 2026	SW Research / Zero.pl	800	36.1	27.8		36.1	8.3
25–26 Nov 2025	UCE Research / Onet	1,021	34.0	32.3		33.7	1.7
10–13 Oct 2025	United Surveys / WP.pl	1,000	34.8	44.5		20.6	–9.7
7–8 Oct 2025	SW Research / Onet	844	35.0	25.1		39.9	9.9

A United Surveys poll for Wirtualna Polska conducted on 25–27 July 2025 found that 36.0% of respondents believed Waldemar Żurek would be a better Minister of Justice than his predecessor, Adam Bodnar, while 26.3% believed he would be worse. A year later, an SW Research poll for Onet conducted on 18–19 May 2026 asked if respondents asked if they ranked Bodnar or Żurek better as a minister: 11.4% preferred Bodnar, and 23.6% preferred Żurek. 37.1% rated both the same.

A Pollster poll for Super Express conducted on 25–28 July, asking for what the minister should prioritize, found that 31% of respondents saw improving the efficiency of courts as the most important task, 26% — persecuting Law and Justice politicians, 16% — increasing punishments for criminals, 12% — separating the Ministry of Justice from the role of Attorney General, 5% — changing the penal code, 4% — procuratorial reform, 3% — changing civil law, 2% — increasing the efficiency of prisons and 1% — advocatory reform.

An SW Research poll for Onet conducted on 5–6 August 2025 found that 34.9% of Poles approved of Żurek's first actions as Minister of Justice, whereas 17.9% disapproved.

An IBRiS poll for Rzeczpospolita conducted on 7–8 November 2025, 32.4% of respondents approved of Żurek's persecution of Law and Justice, whereas 45.1% disapproved. A United Surveys poll for Wirtualna Polska conducted on 2–4 October 2026 found that 48.9% of respondents believed the pace and results of Żurek's settling of irregularities from the Law and Justice governments were his failure, while 39.8% believed otherwise and 11.3% had no opinion.

An SW Research poll for Onet conducted on 28 January 2026 found that 33.2% of Poles thought the judicial situation was better under Żurek than under the United Right governments, whereas 39.6% thought otherwise.

Another SW Research poll for Onet conducted on 18 March 2026 found that 31.3% of respondents approved of Żurek's reforms of the judicial system, whereas 27.5% disapproved.

In August 2026, the government coalition under Donald Tusk appointed its minister, Maciej Berek, to the Constitutional Tribunal. An SW Research poll for Rzeczpospolita found that 59.7% of Poles believed the nomination ran against judicial independence and contributed to the politicization of the judiciary, while only 16.3% believed otherwise.

=== Minister of Internal Affairs and Administration Marcin Kierwiński ===
Date(s) conducted	Polling firm/Link	Sample size	Approve	Disapprove	Neither	Don't know/Neutral	Net approval
26–27 May 2026	SW Research / Onet	800	26.3	29.1		44.7	–2.8

=== Minister of Foreign Affairs Radosław Sikorski ===
Date(s) conducted	Polling firm/Link	Sample size	Approve	Disapprove	Neither	Don't know/Neutral	Net approval
15–17 Jul 2026	UCE Research / Onet	1,013	41.6	23.0	22.6	12.8	18.6
Jun 2026	SW Research / Wprost	1,000	47.0	35.7		17.3	11.3
31 Jan – 1 Feb 2026	United Surveys / WP.pl	1,000	44.8	40.7		14.5	4.1
5–9 Dec 2025	Ipsos / Radio ZET	1,000	30	36	22		–6
25–26 Nov 2025	UCE Research / Onet	1,021	38.0	29.5		32.5	8.5
18–19 Jun 2024	IBRiS / Rz	1,100	41.1	34.3	13.9		6.8
22–23 Mar 2024	United Surveys / WP.pl	1,000	43.8	38.3		17.9	5.5

A United Surveys poll for Wirtualna Polska conducted on 30 January – 1 February 2026 found that 25.1% of Poles rated Sikorski's Twitter interactions positively, whereas 43.4% disapproved of them.

An UCE Research poll for Onet conducted on 10–12 April 2026 showed 33.7% of respondents professed trust for Sikorski, and 33.4% distrusted him.

=== Minister of Health Jolanta Sobierańska-Grenda ===
==== Should Jolanta Sobierańska-Grenda be replaced as Minister of Health? ====
Date(s) conducted	Polling firm/Link	Sample size	Question wording	Remain	Replace	Don't know/Neutral	Net approval
14–15 Jul 2026	SW Research / DGP	804	[Should Jolanta Sobierańska-Grenda be replaced as Minister of Health in relation to the Southern Warsaw Hospital affair?]	18.9	49.5	31.7 (Note: 23.1 — don't know, 8.6 — don't know the affair)	–30.6
16–17 Jun 2026	SW Research / Rz	800	Do you believe Minister of Health Jolanta Sobierańska-Grenda lose her position in relation to [the Southern Warsaw Hospital affair]?	18.5	57.5	24.1	–39.0
19–20 Jun 2026	United Surveys / WP.pl	1,000	Should Minister of Health Jolanta Sobierańska-Grenda resign in relation to the [Southern Warsaw Hospital] affair and the general healthcare situation?	41.4	50.0	8.6	–8.6
28–29 Apr 2026	SW Research / Rz	800	Do you believe Minister of Health Jolanta Sobierańska-Grenda lose her position?	18.0	43.1	38.9	–25.1
Apr 2026	SW Research / Wprost		[Should Jolanta Sobierańska-Grenda be replaced as Minister of Health?]	15.3	41.0	43.7	–25.7

=== Matchups between ministers ===
Date(s) conducted	Polling firm/Link	Sample size	Question	WB	MB	AB	MC	MCz	AD	ADB	KG	JG	PHK	JJ	MK	DK	WKK	KK	SK	MK	IL	MM	SN	BN	MOD	KP	KPN	AP	JR	CzS	TS	RS	JSG	ASz	HW	WŻ	Neither	Don't know/Neutral
Oct 2026	SW Research / Wprost	–	Which minister in the government works worst?	1.4	–	–	3.8	–	2.6	1.5	1.2	0.7	4.1	–	2.4	0.4	3.3	–	1.5	1.9	–	1.7	–	12.5	–	–	4.4	–	0.8	–	1.6	2.8	7.0	–	–	6.6		37.9
14–16 Aug 2026	UCE Research / Onet	1,011	Should Donald Tusk make changes in his cabinet? If so, then who should be dismissed first of all?	–	–	–	–	–	–	–	–	–	–	–	10.7	–	8.6	–	–	–	–	–	–	11.9	–	–	–	–	–	–	–	–	9.2	–	–	8.2	19.9	42.3 (Note: 32.0 – don't know whether there should be changes, 5.8 – don't know who should be dismissed, 4.5 – don't know ministers)
24–25 Mar 2026	SW Research / Wprost	811	Which minister in the government works worst?	0.9	0.6	–	1.8	–	3.0	2.5	1.2	1.6	5.9	–	2.6	1.8	4.5	–	1.1	1.4	–	1.9	–	10.3	–	–	3.6	–	0.6	–	1.2	6.9	5.1	–	–	6.9		34.3
17–18 Jun 2025	SW Research / Wprost	831	Which minister in the government works worst?	–	–	6.3	–	1.1	2.5	1.5	0.9	–	5.5	1.2	–	0.9	4.1	4.1	–	1.2	6.3	–	3.1	8.9	1.3	1.2	1.4	1.1	–	2.1	1.3	3.0	–	0.8	0.8	–		40.7
13–14 Jun 2025	UCE Research / Onet	1,017	Which minister in the government works best?	–	–	7.2	–	1.9	5.6	5.7	4.0	–	2.9	1.7	1.8	2.2	9.4	–	3.0	2.2	3.3	–	4.2	3.9	2.4	3.6	3.0	2.2	–	2.3	4.7	14.4	–	3.0	2.1	–		
13–14 Jun 2025	UCE Research / Onet	1,017	Which minister in the government works worst?	–	–	9.8	–	3.6	4.9	5.1	2.5	–	10.4	2.6	5.8	1.8	6.0	–	7.1	3.0	12.8	–	5.5	13.6	3.4	2.3	2.2	4.1	–	5.0	3.8	4.9	–	3.1	2.6	–		

=== Ratings of ministers ===
Date(s) conducted	Polling firm/Link	Sample size	Rating	WB	MB	ABo	ABu	MC	MCz	AD	ADB	KG	JG	PHK	JJ	MK	DK	WKK	KK	SK	MK	IL	MM	SN	BN	MOD	KP	KPN	AP	JR	CzS	TS	RS	JSG	ASz	DW	HW	WŻ
18–19 Jun 2024	IBRiS / Rz	1,100	Approve	–	–	41.1	9.1	–	10.9	23.3	26.8	23.3	–	20.0	16.8	–	16.6	28.9	28.6	–	–	29.5	–	22.9	30.9	10.6	14.8	21.0	–	–	18.9	29.7	41.1	–	23.5	19.6	16.0	–
18–19 Jun 2024	IBRiS / Rz	1,100	Disapprove	–	–	34.9	21.3	–	24.6	31.6	33.9	31.1	–	40.2	22.7	–	26.5	41.0	34.6	–	–	37.1	–	31.8	37.7	22.9	22.9	27.9	–	–	31.8	36.4	34.3	–	32.4	26.5	24.9	–

=== Other ministerial polls ===
An Opinia24 poll for RMF FM conducted on 4–6 May 2026 found 45% of respondents desired a government reconstruction before that year's summer, and 22% believed otherwise.

== Other polls ==
=== Government actions regarding 2024 floods ===
Date(s) conducted	Polling firm/Link	Sample size	Question wording	Positively	Negatively	Don't know/Neutral	Net approval
Dec 2024	Opinia24 / RMF FM	1,000	How [well] did the government deal with removing the effects of the floods and helping people affected?	38	49	13	–11
29–30 Sep 2024	Pollster / "19:30"	1,047	How do you assess the government's action during the floods?	48	40	12	8
Sep 2024	UCE Research / Onet	–	Is the government doing a good job of tackling the extreme flooding in southern Poland?	44.7	42.8	12.5	1.9
20–21 Sep 2024	United Surveys / WP.pl	1,000	How do you assess the government's actions regarding the flood and removing its effects?	53.3	38.2	8.5	15.1

=== Should Donald Tusk be replaced as Prime Minister? ===
Date(s) conducted	Polling firm/Link	Sample size	Question wording	Remain	Replace	Don't know/Neutral	Net approval
24–25 Feb 2026	SW Research / Rz	800	Would you want Donald Tusk to remain as Prime Minister after the 2027 parliamentary election?	36.8	50.6	12.8	–13.8
25–26 Nov 2025	UCE Research / Onet	1,021	Do you believe that Donald Tusk should remain as Prime Minister until the end of the current government's term?	40.5	45.7	13.8	–5.2
14–16 Nov 2025	United Surveys / WP.pl	1,000	Do you agree that Donald Tusk should resign as Prime Minister before the 2027 parliamentary election?	45.0	47.6	7.4	–2.6
13 Oct 2025 (Note: Date of release)	Opinia24 / RMF FM	1,000	Do you believe that Donald Tusk should be replaced as Prime Minister?	32	46	21	–14
11–12 Oct 2025	Pollster / "SE.pl"	1,002	Should Donald Tusk step down as Prime Minister?	34	52	14	–18
25–27 Jul 2025	United Surveys / WP.pl	1,000	Do you believe that Donald Tusk should resign and stop functioning as Prime Minister?	48.6	43.8	7.6	4.8
22–23 Jul 2025	SW Research / Rz	800	Would the coalition government function better if it was led by someone other than Donald Tusk?	30.8	37.9	31.3	–7.1
1–2 Jul 2025	SW Research / Rz	800	Do you believe that as part of the cabinet reconstruction the coalition should replace the Prime Minister?	32.3	45.4	22.4	–13.1
27–29 Jun 2025	United Surveys / WP.pl	1,000	Do you believe Donald Tusk should... resign/remain as Prime Minister	41.2	41.5	17.3	–0.3
6–8 Jun 2025	United Surveys / WP.pl	1,000	Do you agree with the statement that Donald Tusk should resign as Prime Minister?	44.8	43.3	11.9	1.5

A United Surveys poll for Wirtualna Polska conducted on 7–9 August 2026 showed 72.9% of respondents believed Tusk would remain as Prime Minister for the remaining year of his term, while 13.0% believed the Prime Minister would change before 2027.

=== Who could replace Donald Tusk as Prime Minister? ===
Date(s) conducted	Polling firm/Link	Sample size	Question wording	Tusk (KO) remains	New Left politicians	Hołownia (PL2050)	Kosiniak-Kamysz (PSL)	Sikorski (KO)	Trzaskowski (KO)	Other option	Nobody from the coalition	Don't know/Neutral
12 Aug 2026	SW Research / Zero.pl	801	Who do you believe could replace Donald Tusk as Prime Minister in the future?	—	—	6.0	8.0	24.7	—	30.3 (Note: Others – 23.0, Magdalena Sobkowiak-Czarnecka – 4.4, Adam Szłapka – 2.9)	—	31.0
7–8 Aug 2026	Pollster / "SE.pl"	1,022	Who do you believe would be the best candidate for Prime Minister from the Civic Coalition?	29	—	—	—	35	16	20 (Note: Others – 11, Andrzej Domański – 5, Tomasz Siemoniak – 4)	—	—
21–22 Jul 2026	SW Research / Rz	800	If the Civic Coalition were to form a government after the 2027 elections, who, in your opinion, would be the better candidate for prime minister from that party?	17.1	—	—	—	25.2	—	32.6 (Note: "I rate both equally")	—	25.1
17–18 Mar 2026	SW Research / Zero.pl	800	Who do you believe would be the best candidate for Prime Minister from the Civic Coalition?	19.0	—	—	—	15.2	10.7	20.0 (Note: Others – 13.5, Witold Zembaczyński – 2.8, Adam Szłapka – 2.4, Michał Szczerba – 1.3)	—	35.0
13–15 Feb 2026	United Surveys / WP.pl	1,000	Would Władysław Kosiniak-Kamysz be a better Prime Minister than Donald Tusk?	52.6	—	—	27.6	—	—	—	—	19.8
5–9 Dec 2025	Ipsos / Radio ZET	1,000	Would Radosław Sikorski be a better Prime Minister than Donald Tusk?	43	—	—	—	25	—	—	—	32
24–26 Oct 2025	United Surveys / WP.pl	1,000	Do you believe Radosław Sikorski should replace Donald Tusk as Prime Minister?	44.6	—	—	—	33.1	—	—	—	22.3
27–28 Sep 2025	Pollster / "SE.pl"	1,026	If Tusk decided to resign, who should be the Prime Minister of the government?	—	5 (Note: Krzysztof Gawkowski – 3, Włodzimierz Czarzasty – 2)	13	10	41	13	18	—	—
2–3 Sep 2025	SW Research / Rz	800	Which of these politicians is the best candidate for Prime Minister?	16.9	1.6 (Note: Agnieszka Dziemianowicz-Bąk – 1.6)	3.9	2.9	14.5	—	47.1		13.1
13–14 Aug 2025	IBRiS / Radio ZET	1,607	Would Radosław Sikorski be a better Prime Minister than Donald Tusk?	40.6	—	—	—	34.7	—	—	—	24.8
5–6 Aug 2025	SW Research / Rz	800	In your opinion, would Radosław Sikorski be a better Prime Minister than Donald Tusk?	15.5	—	—	—	26.8	—	—	—	57.7
25–28 Jul 2025	Pollster / "SE.pl"	1,047	Who should be the Prime Minister of the government?	38	4 (Note: Włodzimierz Czarzasty – 2, Krzysztof Gawkowski – 2)	11	11	17	13	6	—	—
8–9 Jul 2025	SW Research / Onet	816	Would Radosław Sikorski be a better Prime Minister than Donald Tusk?	31.4	—	—	—	33.3	—	—	—	35.3
1–2 Jul 2025	SW Research / Rz	800	If the ruling coalition decided to change the Prime Minister, who should replace Donald Tusk?	—	8.4 (Note: Magdalena Biejat – 5.4, Włodzimierz Czarzasty – 3.0)	7.3	6.7	17.6	12.6	12.2	19.7	15.5

== See also ==
- 2023 Polish parliamentary election
