= Third Tusk cabinet =

Government of Poland since 2023

Third Cabinet of Donald Tusk
- 22nd Cabinet of Poland
- 2023–present
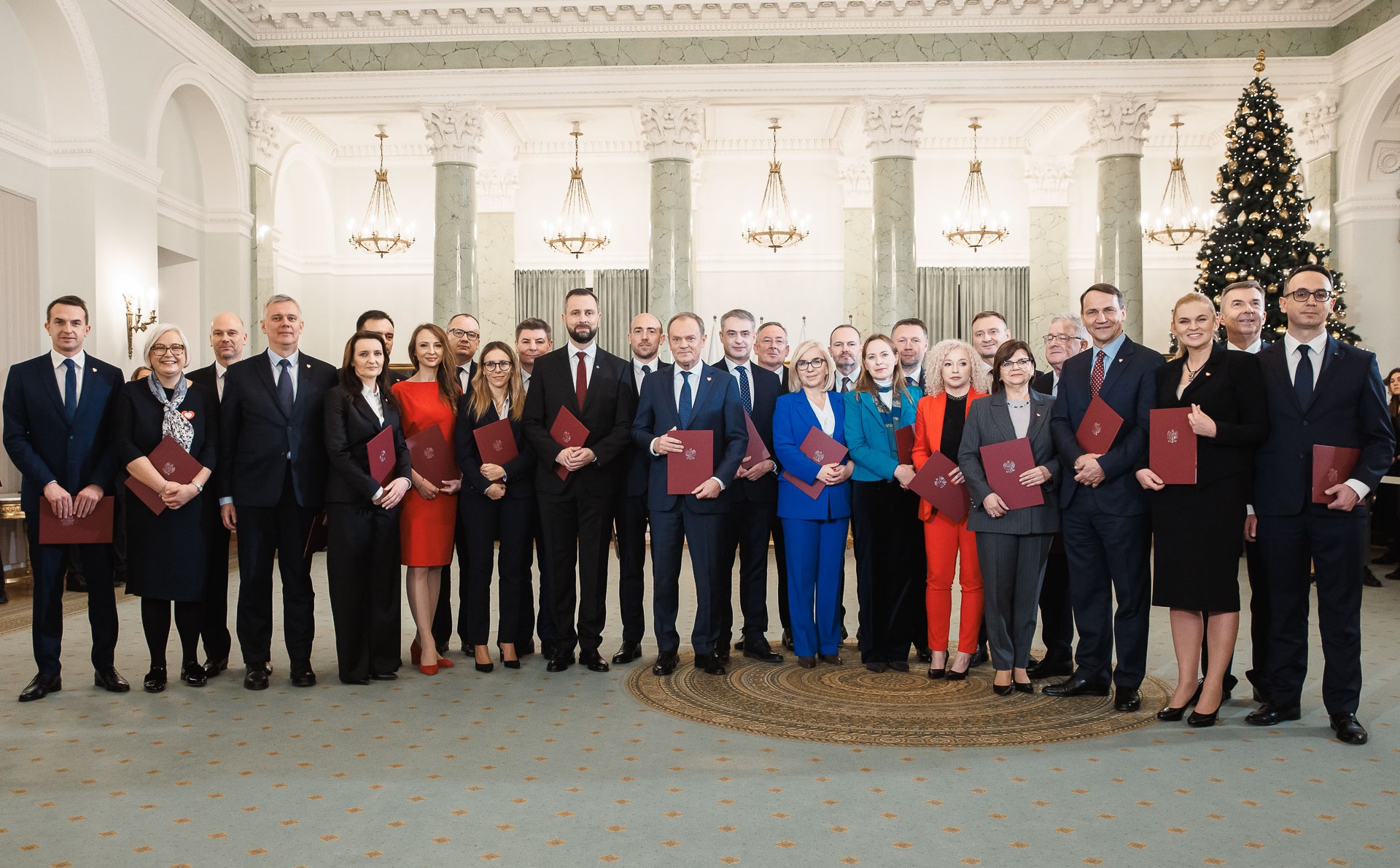
- Ministers pictured after their swearing-in, 13 December (2023)
- Date formed: 13 December 2023

People and organizations
- President: Andrzej Duda; Karol Nawrocki
- Prime Minister: Donald Tusk
- Prime Minister's history: 2007–2014 2023–present
- Deputy Prime Ministers: Władysław Kosiniak-Kamysz; Krzysztof Gawkowski; Radosław Sikorski
- No. of ministers: 21
- Member parties: Civic Coalition; Polish Coalition; New Left; Centre Union (created 2026); Poland 2050; Supported by: Independents (Note: Joanna Mucha, Paweł Zalewski and Tomasz Zimoch former MPs of Poland 2050 and Marcin Józefaciuk former MP of Civic Coalition)
- Status in legislature: Majority (coalition)
- Opposition parties: Law and Justice; Development Plus; Confederation; Razem (confidence 2023–2024); Direct Democracy; The Crown
- Opposition leader: Jarosław Kaczyński

History
- Election: 2023 parliamentary election
- Legislature term: 10th Sejm & 11th Senate
- Predecessor: Morawiecki III

The Third Cabinet of Donald Tusk is the coalition government of Poland headed by Donald Tusk who was officially nominated and confirmed as the Prime Minister of Poland on 11 December 2023 by the members of the Sejm following the failure of Mateusz Morawiecki's Third Cabinet to secure a vote of confidence. On 12 December, Tusk addressed the parliament and announced members of his cabinet, later that day Tusk's cabinet successfully obtained a vote of confidence with 248 of the 460 MPs voting in the affirmative. He and his cabinet were officially sworn in by president Andrzej Duda on 13 December 2023.

Tusk previously served as Prime Minister of Poland between 2007 and 2014, president of the European Council between 2014 and 2019, and the president of the European People's Party (EPP) from 2019 to 2022. The opposition's victory in the 2023 Polish parliamentary election and Tusk's return to power in Poland were mostly positively received by the international community, with multiple news outlets pointing to the erosion of certain democratic structures in Poland and the worsening of the country's relationship with the European Union under the former right-wing government led by Law and Justice.

== Background ==
=== 2023 parliamentary election ===
Tusk's cabinet was formed following the dissolution of Morawiecki's caretaker government originally established as the result of 2023 Polish parliamentary election, which took place on Sunday, 15 October 2023. The United Right won a plurality of seats but fell short of a Sejm majority. The opposition, including the Civic Coalition, Poland 2050, Polish Coalition, and The Left, secured a Senate majority.

Although the United Right would be unable to govern on its own, the Polish president Andrzej Duda stated his intention to re-appoint the incumbent Mateusz Morawiecki as Prime Minister due to the existing albeit unofficial convention of nominating a member of the winning party. The four opposition parties criticized Duda's decision as a delay tactic. The opposition parties subsequently signed a coalition agreement on 10 November, de facto taking over control of the Sejm, and agreed to nominate former Prime Minister and European Council President Donald Tusk as their candidate. Morawiecki's new cabinet, dubbed "two-week government" and "zombie government" by the media due to its anticipated short-livedness, was sworn in on 27 November 2023.

=== Nomination of Donald Tusk ===
As expected, the Morawiecki government was defeated in the Sejm on 11 December 2023, effectively ending its tenure. Immediately following the vote, the four-party opposition coalition nominated Tusk as prime minister. Partia Razem, although part of The Left coalition and therefore entitled to cabinet seats, opted not to enter the government due to a number of key issues being left out of the coalition agreement, but has also vowed to support Tusk's government in votes of confidence. The nomination was subsequently confirmed by absolute majority vote, with 248 members of the Sejm voting in favor. Also on 11 December, president Andrzej Duda accepted Morawiecki's resignation, while designating him as acting Prime Minister of a caretaker government until Tusk's swearing-in ceremony, which took place on 13 December 2023.

Election of the Prime Minister; Donald Tusk (PO)
Ballot →	11 December 2023
Required majority →	225 out of 449
Votes in favour: • KO (157); • KP (33); • PL2050 (32); • Lewica (26)	248 / 449
Votes against: • PiS (181); • KWiN (17); • Kukiz'15 (3)	201 / 449
Absent: • PiS (9); • KWiN (1)	10 / 460

=== Confirmation of the cabinet ===
On 12 December 2023 Tusk addressed the parliament and announced members of his cabinet. Following his two hour speech 254 MPs signed up to ask questions about his upcoming government. Due to an antisemitic incident perpetuated by MP Grzegorz Braun in the Sejm Complex, the vote of confidence was delayed by several hours. At 9:53 pm, Tusk's cabinet secured the vote of confidence with 248 of the 460 MPs voting in the affirmative. He and his cabinet were officially sworn in by president Andrzej Duda on 13 December 2023.

Vote of confidence Third Cabinet of Donald Tusk
Ballot →	12 December 2023
Required majority →	225 out of 449
Votes in favour: • KO (157); • KP (33); • PL2050 (32); • Lewica (26)	248 / 449
Votes against: • PiS (182); • KWiN (16); • Kukiz'15 (3)	201 / 449
Absent: • PiS (8); • KWiN (2)	10 / 460

== Cabinet ==
On 12 December, members of the Cabinet presented by Donald Tusk were elected by Sejm. The ministers assumed their offices on 13 December, upon their appointment and swearing-in by the President.

Order (Note: Ministries sorted by alphabetical order (in Polish), excluding Deputy PMs)	Office	Portrait	Name	Party	Coalition	In office	
Order	Office	Portrait	Name	Party	Coalition	From	To
Prime Minister and Deputy Prime Ministers
1	Prime Minister		Donald Tusk	Civic Coalition	Civic Coalition	13 December 2023	Incumbent
2	Deputy Prime Minister & Minister of Digital Affairs		Krzysztof Gawkowski	New Left	The Left	13 December 2023	Incumbent
3	Deputy Prime Minister & Minister of National Defence		Władysław Kosiniak-Kamysz	PSL	Polish Coalition	13 December 2023	Incumbent
4	Minister of Foreign Affairs		Radosław Sikorski	Civic Coalition	Civic Coalition	13 December 2023	Incumbent
4	Deputy Prime Minister		Radosław Sikorski	Civic Coalition	Civic Coalition	24 July 2025	Incumbent
5	Minister of Finance and Economy (Note: As Minister of Finance until 25 July 2025)		Andrzej Domański	Civic Coalition	Civic Coalition	13 December 2023	Incumbent
5	Deputy Prime Minister		Andrzej Domański	Civic Coalition	Civic Coalition	20 November 2026	Incumbent
Constitutional ministers (Note: Ministers in charge of government administration departments)
6	Minister of State Assets		Borys Budka	Civic Coalition	Civic Coalition	13 December 2023	13 May 2024
6	Minister of State Assets		Jakub Jaworowski	Independent	Civic Coalition	13 May 2024	24 July 2025
6	Minister of State Assets		Wojciech Balczun	Independent	Civic Coalition	24 July 2025	Incumbent
7	Minister of Education		Barbara Nowacka	Civic Coalition	Civic Coalition	13 December 2023	Incumbent
8	Minister of Energy		Miłosz Motyka	PSL	Polish Coalition	24 July 2025	Incumbent
9	Minister of Funding and Regional Policy		Katarzyna Pełczyńska-Nałęcz	Poland 2050		13 December 2023	20 November 2026
9	Minister of Funding and Regional Policy		Agnieszka Bartol	Independent		20 November 2026	Incumbent
10	Minister of Infrastructure		Dariusz Klimczak	PSL	Polish Coalition	13 December 2023	Incumbent
11	Minister of Climate and Environment		Paulina Hennig-Kloska	Centre		13 December 2023	Incumbent
12	Minister of Culture and National Heritage		Bartłomiej Sienkiewicz	Civic Coalition	Civic Coalition	13 December 2023	13 May 2024
12	Minister of Culture and National Heritage		Hanna Wróblewska	Independent	Civic Coalition	13 May 2024	24 July 2025
12	Minister of Culture and National Heritage		Marta Cienkowska	Poland 2050		24 July 2025	Incumbent
13	Minister of Science and Higher Education		Dariusz Wieczorek	New Left	The Left	13 December 2023	17 January 2025
13	Minister of Science and Higher Education		Marcin Kulasek	New Left	The Left	17 January 2025	Incumbent
14	Minister of Industry		Marzena Czarnecka	Independent	Civic Coalition	13 December 2023	24 July 2025
15	Minister of Family, Labour and Social Policy		Agnieszka Dziemianowicz-Bąk	New Left	The Left	13 December 2023	Incumbent
16	Minister of Agriculture and Rural Development		Czesław Siekierski	Polish People's Party		13 December 2023	24 July 2025
16	Minister of Agriculture and Rural Development		Stefan Krajewski	PSL	Polish Coalition	24 July 2025	Incumbent
17	Minister of Development and Technology		Krzysztof Hetman	PSL	Polish Coalition	13 December 2023	13 May 2024
17	Minister of Development and Technology		Krzysztof Paszyk	PSL	Polish Coalition	13 May 2024	24 July 2025
18	Minister of Sport and Tourism		Sławomir Nitras	Civic Coalition	Civic Coalition	13 December 2023	24 July 2025
18	Minister of Sport and Tourism		Jakub Rutnicki	Civic Coalition	Civic Coalition	24 July 2025	Incumbent
19	Minister of Justice		Adam Bodnar	Independent	Civic Coalition	13 December 2023	24 July 2025
19	Minister of Justice		Waldemar Żurek	Independent	Civic Coalition	24 July 2025	Incumbent
20	Minister of the Interior and Administration		Marcin Kierwiński	Civic Coalition	Civic Coalition	13 December 2023	13 May 2024
20	Minister of the Interior and Administration		Tomasz Siemoniak	Civic Coalition	Civic Coalition	13 May 2024	24 July 2025
20	Minister of the Interior and Administration		Marcin Kierwiński	Civic Coalition	Civic Coalition	24 July 2025	Incumbent
21	Minister of Health		Izabela Leszczyna	Civic Coalition	Civic Coalition	13 December 2023	24 July 2025
21	Minister of Health		Jolanta Sobierańska-Grenda	Independent	Civic Coalition	24 July 2025	Incumbent
22	Minister for the European Union		Adam Szłapka	Civic Coalition	Civic Coalition	13 December 2023	24 July 2025
Other cabinet ministers
23	Minister Coordinator of the Secret Services		Tomasz Siemoniak	Civic Coalition	Civic Coalition	13 December 2023	Incumbent
24	Minister for Civil Society & Chair of The Public Benefit Committee		Agnieszka Buczyńska	Poland 2050		13 December 2023	16 October 2024
24	Minister for Civil Society & Chair of The Public Benefit Committee		Adriana Porowska	Poland 2050		16 October 2024	24 July 2025
25	Minister for Equality		Katarzyna Kotula	New Left	The Left	13 December 2023	24 July 2025
26	Minister for Senior Citizens Affairs		Marzena Okła-Drewnowicz	Civic Coalition	Civic Coalition	13 December 2023	24 July 2025
27	Minister without portfolio & Chief of the Chancellery of the Prime Minister		Jan Grabiec	Civic Coalition	Civic Coalition	13 December 2023	Incumbent
28	Minister without portfolio		Maciej Berek	Independent	Civic Coalition	13 December 2023	14 August 2026
29	Minister without portfolio		Marcin Kierwiński	Civic Coalition	Civic Coalition	26 September 2024	24 July 2025

== Supporting parties ==
Election Coalition (2023)	Leader	Party	Ideology	Sejm Deputies	Senators	Ministers
Civic Coalition	Donald Tusk	Civic Coalition	Liberal conservatism	156 / 460 (Note: KO (137); Greens (3); T!DPL (2); Au (1); Independent (14))	43 / 100 (Note: KO (38); T!DPL (1); Independent (4))	8 / 22
Third Way; Defunct	Władysław Kosiniak-Kamysz	Polish People's Party (Polish Coalition)	Christian democracy	33 / 460 (Note: PSL (28); CdP (3); Independent (1))	9 / 100 (Note: PSL (4); PL2050 (2); UED (1); CdP (1); Independent (1))	4 / 22
Third Way; Defunct	Katarzyna Pełczyńska-Nałęcz	Poland 2050	Christian democracy	15 / 460	9 / 100	2 / 22
Third Way; Defunct	Paulina Hennig-Kloska	Centre	Liberalism	15 / 460	3 / 100	1 / 22
The Left	Włodzimierz Czarzasty Robert Biedroń	New Left	Social democracy	21 / 460 (Note: NL (18); Independent (3) (Note: Dorota Olko, Joanna Wicha, Daria Gosek-Popiołek))	8 / 100 (Note: NL (4); UP (1); PPS (1); Independent (2) (Note: Magdalena Biejat, Anna Górska))	3 / 22
Independents						4 / 22
Government				239 / 460	63 / 100	22
Support				4 / 460	0 / 100	22
Total				243 / 460	63 / 100	22

== Votes of confidence ==
=== 2025 ===
Following the defeat of the government-backed Rafał Trzaskowski in the 2025 Polish presidential election, Prime Minister Tusk called for a new vote of confidence in his government, held on 11 June 2025. Despite speculation of a possible breakdown of the coalition, Tusk survived after gaining the support of all 243 MPs that made up his coalition.

Vote of confidence Third Cabinet of Donald Tusk
Ballot →	11 June 2025
Required majority →	227 out of 453
Votes in favour: • KO (157); • KP (32); • PL2050 (32); • Lewica (21); • Independent (1)	243 / 453
Votes against: • PiS (182); • KWiN (16); • Razem (5); • Free Republicans (4); • KKP (3)	210 / 453
Absent: • PiS (7)	7 / 460

=== 2026 ===
Following the 2026 Polish Constitutional Tribunal crisis, opposition MPs, mainly from Development Plus and Confederation, filed a motion for a constructive vote of no confidence, nominating right-wing politician Marek Jurek as a candidate for Prime Minister. The motion was rejected on 17 November 2026.

Vote of no confidence Third Cabinet of Donald Tusk
Ballot →	17 November 2026
Required majority →	231 out of 460
Votes in favour: • PiS (137); • R+ (40); • KWiN (14); • DB (3); • KKP (3); • Independent (3)	200 / 460
Votes against: • KO (153); • PSL (32); • Left (21); • PL2050 (14); • Centre Union (14); • Razem (4); • Independent (4)	242 / 460
Absent: • PiS (10); • KWiN (3); • KO (2); • Centre Union (1); • PL2050 (1); • Independent (1)	18 / 460

== Popular mandate ==
Support for governing parties according to the popular vote in the 2023 election.

Member party	Popular vote (Sejm)	Percentage (Sejm)	MPs	Ministers	Popular vote (Senate)	Percentage (Senate)	Senators	Leader
Civic Coalition	6,629,402	30.70%	157	12	6,187,295	28.91%	41	Donald Tusk
Third Way	3,110,670	14.41%	65	7	2,462,360	11.50%	11	Władysław Kosiniak-Kamysz Szymon Hołownia
The Left	1,859,018	8.61%	26	4	1,131,639	5.29%	9	Włodzimierz Czarzasty Robert Biedroń
Independents	—	—	—	4	540,974 (Note: Independent candidates supported by Senate Pact 2023)	2.53%	4	
Gov.+Supp.	11,599,090	53.72%	248	27	10,354,354	48.38%	65	Donald Tusk
Poland	21,593,295	100%	460	—	21,402,998	100%	100	

== See also ==
- 2023 Polish public media crisis
