= Ministry of Industry (Poland) =

Government ministry of Poland

- Ministerstwo Przemysłu
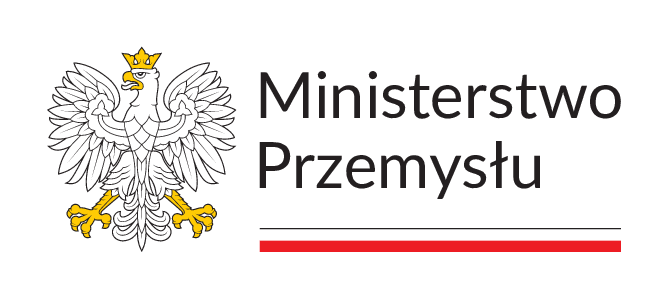

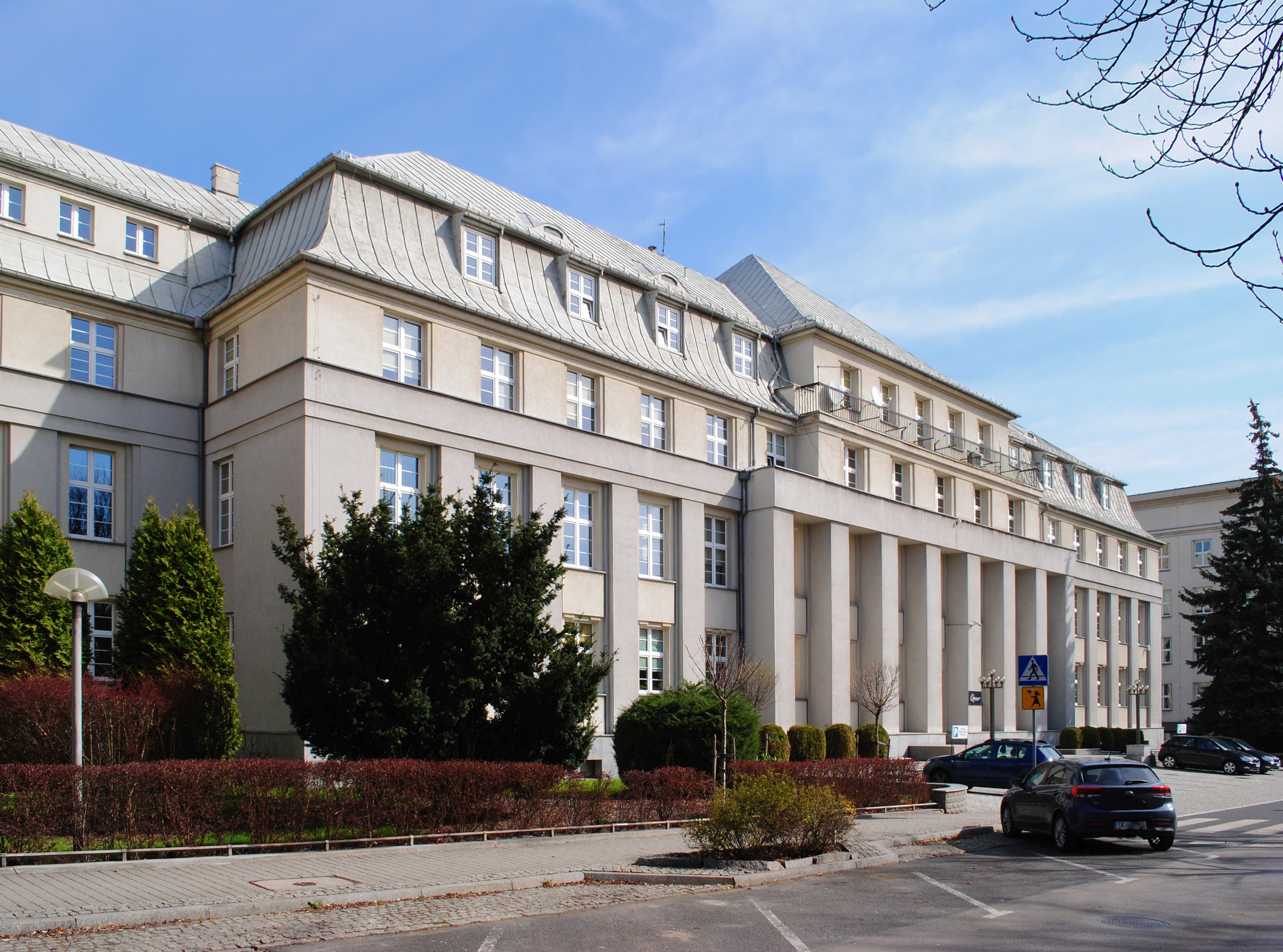
- Headquarters of the Ministry of Industry (Budynek Dyrekcji Kopalń Księcia Pszczyńskiego)

Agency overview
- Formed: 1 March 2024
- Dissolved: 24 July 2025
- Headquarters: ul. Powstańców 30, 40-039 Katowice
- Website: gov.pl/web/przemysl

The Ministry of Industry (Polish: Ministerstwo Przemysłu) was a Polish government administration body which was responsible for overseeing the minister in charge of the government administration sector related to the management of mineral deposits. The ministry was established on March 1, 2024 and dissolved on July 24, 2025. The ministry under the same name (with a partially different scope of activities) also existed from 1987 to 1991. The competences of the Ministry of Industry will be taken over by newly established Ministry of Energy.

== History ==
On December 13, 2023, the Sejm of the Republic of Poland selected the Minister of Industry as part of the Council of Ministers. According to the attribution regulation, the minister was to oversee the government administration sector related to the management of mineral deposits. Initially, the administrative support for this role was provided by the Ministry of State Assets and the Silesian Voivodeship Office in Katowice.

An independent Ministry of Industry was established by the regulation of the Council of Ministers on February 20, 2024, by transforming the Ministry of State Assets, involving the separation of organizational units handling the affairs of the aforementioned government administration sector and the employees handling those affairs. This regulation came into force on March 1, 2024 and from that day, the newly established ministry took over the organizational support of the Minister of Industry.

== Organizational structure ==
The ministry included the Political Cabinet of the Minister and the following organizational units:

- Department of Analysis
- Department of Audit and Control
- Department of Budget and Finance
- Department of Digitization and Security
- Department of European Funds and Foreign Affairs
- Department of Mining and Metallurgy
- Department of Communication
- Legal Department
- Office of the Director General and Administration
- Minister's Office

Bodies supervised by the minister:

- President of the Higher Mining Office

Organizational units supervised by the minister:

- Central Mining Institute – National Research Institute in Katowice
- KOMAG Institute of Mining Technology in Gliwice
- Institute of Fuel and Energy Technology in Zabrze
- "Poltegor-Institute" Institute of Opencast Mining in Wrocław

== List of ministers ==
Image	Name	Political Party	Term of Office		Prime Minister (Government)
	Marzena Czarnecka	Independent	December 13, 2023	July 25, 2025	Donald Tusk (Tusk III)

== See also ==
- Ministries of the Republic of Poland
