= Ministry of Science and Higher Education (Poland) =

Polish government ministry

- Ministerstwo Nauki i Szkolnictwa Wyższego
- Ministerial logotype

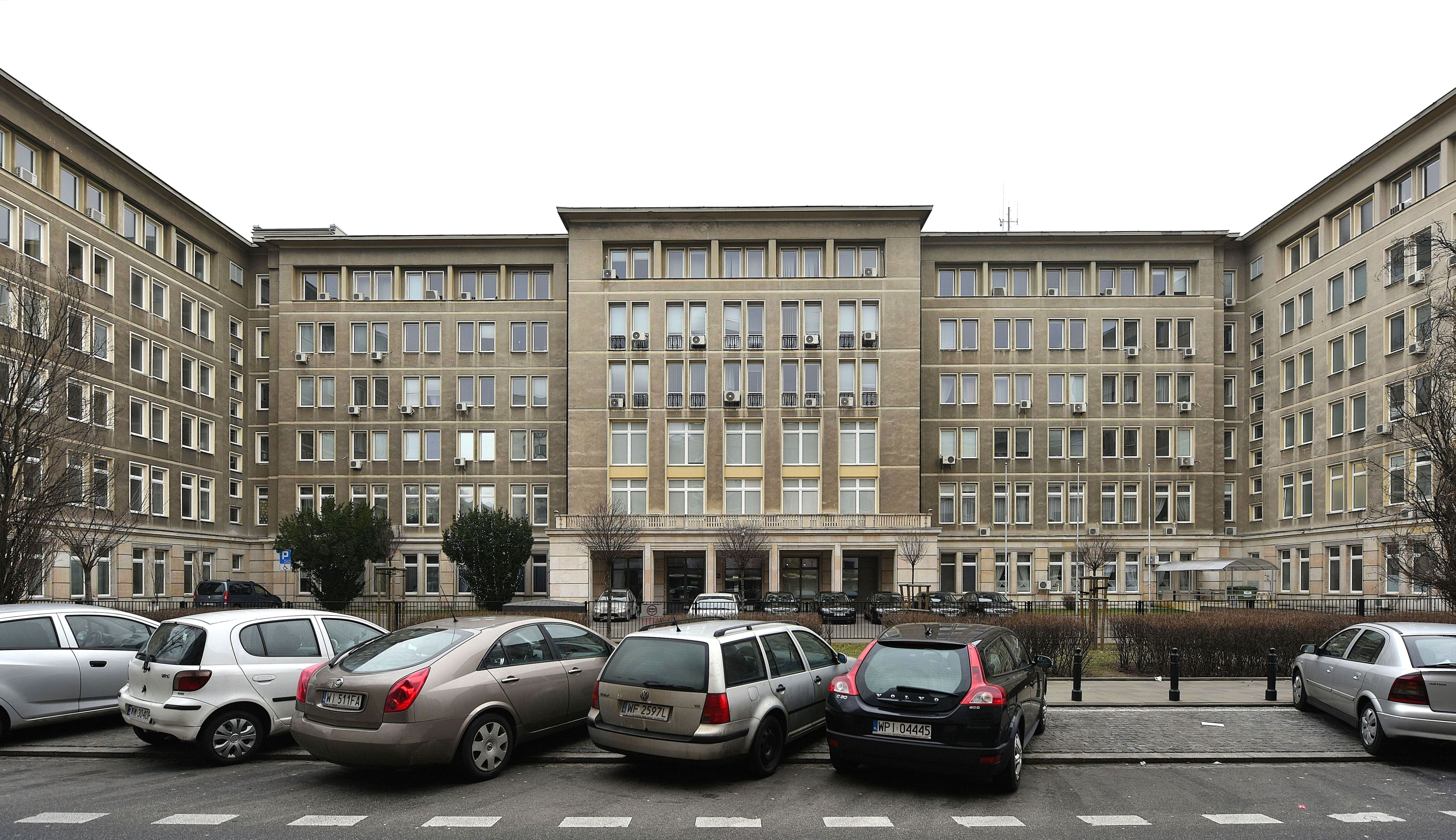

Agency overview
- Formed: 5 May 2006; 1 January 2024
- Headquarters: ul. Wspólna 1/3, Warsaw
- Agency executive: Marcin Kulasek, Minister of Science and Higher Education; First Deputy Minister
- Parent agency: Council of Ministers
- Website: www.gov.pl/web/science

The Ministry of Science and Higher Education (Polish: Ministerstwo Nauki i Szkolnictwa Wyższego) in Poland was opened on 5 May 2006 by the Minister of Science and Higher Education, in replacement of several parts of the Ministry of Education and Science. The Minister of Science and Higher Education administers governmental activities in science and higher education and has a budget for scientific research provided by State funds. The Rada Nauki (Science Council) acts together with the Minister, in replacement of the Komitet Badań Naukowych (Science Research Council) which was closed in 2005. The headquarters of the ministry are located at ulica Wspólna 1/3, Warsaw.

As of 2025, the current Minister of Science and Higher Education is Marcin Kulasek.

== List of ministers ==
=== Ministers of Education and Science ===
Portrait	Name	Party	Term of Office		Cabinet (Prime minister)
	Michał Seweryński	Law and Justice	31 October 2005	5 May 2006	Kazimierz Marcinkiewicz (Marcinkiewicz)
{{
	Michał Seweryński	Law and Justice	5 May 2006	7 September 2007	Kazimierz Marcinkiewicz (Marcinkiewicz), Jarosław Kaczyński (Kaczyński)
	Jarosław Kaczyński	Law and Justice	7 September 2007	11 September 2007	Jarosław Kaczyński (Kaczyński)
	Michał Seweryński	Law and Justice	11 September 2007	16 November 2007	Jarosław Kaczyński (Kaczyński)
	Barbara Kudrycka	Civic Platform	16 November 2007	27 November 2013	Donald Tusk (Tusk I), (Tusk II)
	Lena Kolarska-Bobińska	Civic Platform	27 November 2013	16 November 2015	Donald Tusk (Tusk II) Ewa Kopacz (Kopacz)
	Jarosław Gowin	Agreement	16 November 2015	9 April 2020	Beata Szydło (Szydło) Mateusz Morawiecki (Morawiecki I), (Morawiecki II)
	vacancy		9 April 2020	16 April 2020	Mateusz Morawiecki (Morawiecki II)
	Wojciech Murdzek	Agreement	16 April 2020	19 October 2020	Mateusz Morawiecki (Morawiecki II)
Ministers of Education and Science
	Przemysław Czarnek	Law and Justice	19 October 2020	27 November 2023	Mateusz Morawiecki (Morawiecki II)
	Krzysztof Szczucki	Law and Justice	27 November 2023	13 December 2023	Mateusz Morawiecki (Morawiecki III)
Ministers of Science and Higher Education
	Dariusz Wieczorek	New Left	13 December 2023	17 January 2025	Donald Tusk (Tusk III)
	Marcin Kulasek	New Left	17 January 2025	present	Donald Tusk (Tusk III)
