= Robert Kropiwnicki =

Polish politician (born 1974)

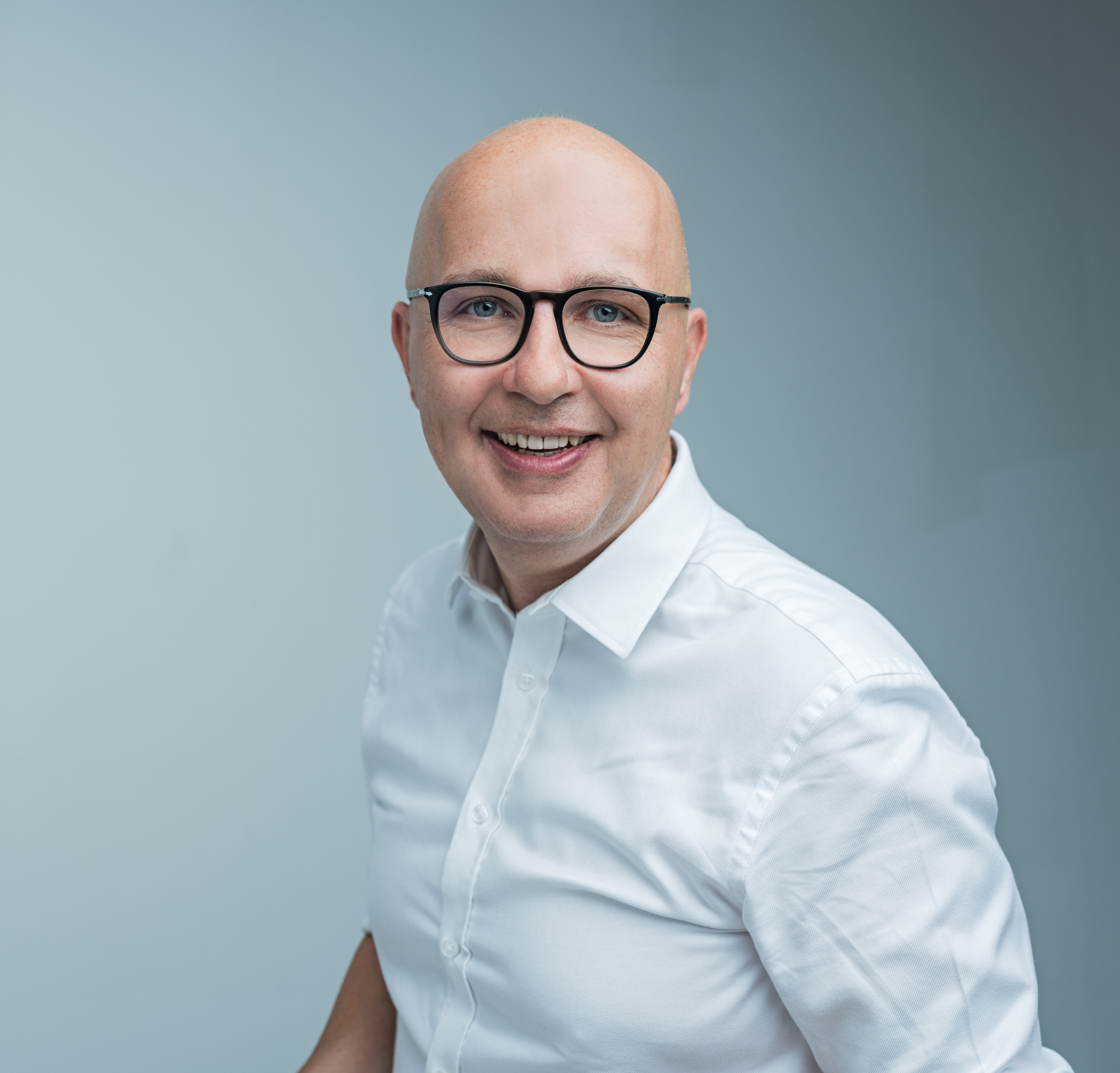

Member of the Sejm
- Incumbent
- Assumed office 16 December 2010

Deputy Ministry of State Assets
- In office 13 December 2023

Personal details
- Born: 23 July 1974 (age 51) Legnica, Poland
- Party: Civic Platform

Robert Kropiwnicki (born 23 July 1974) is a Polish politician. He has been a member of the Sejm since 2010 representing the constituency of Legnica. In 2010, he replaced Janusz Mikulicz in the Sejm (6th term) and Kropiwnicki was re-elected in 2011 and in 2015 (7th and 8th term of the Sejm respectively). In 2019 parliamentary election, he was again elected to the Sejm (9th term). He is affiliated with the Civic Platform party. In 2023 parliamentary election he was reelected to the Sejm with 31,838 votes. In the same year he was elected by the Sejm to the National Council of the Judiciary.

He was born in Legnica, Poland.
