= Ministry of State Assets (Poland) =

Polish government administration office

- Ministerstwo Aktywów Państwowych
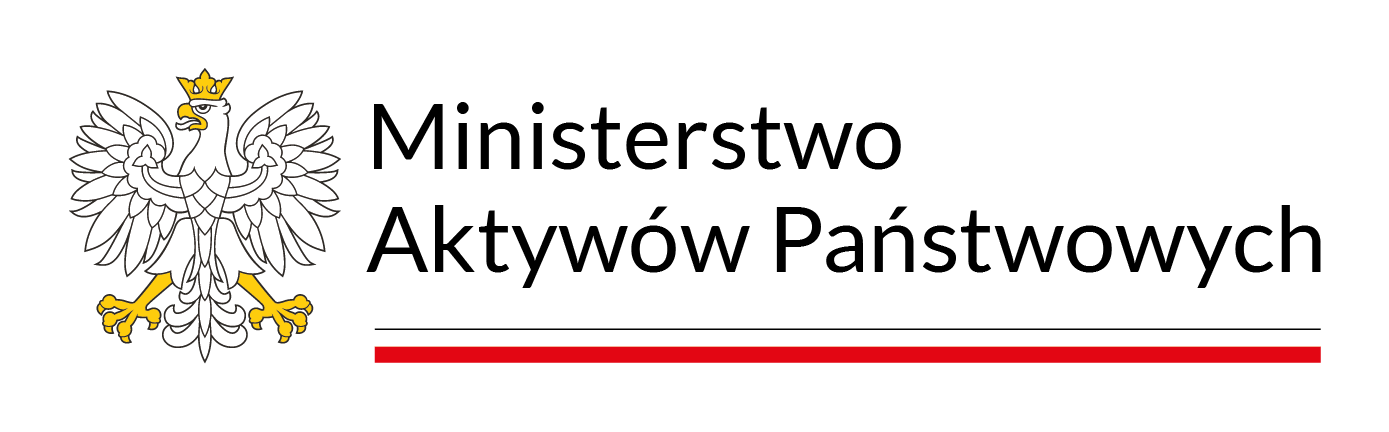

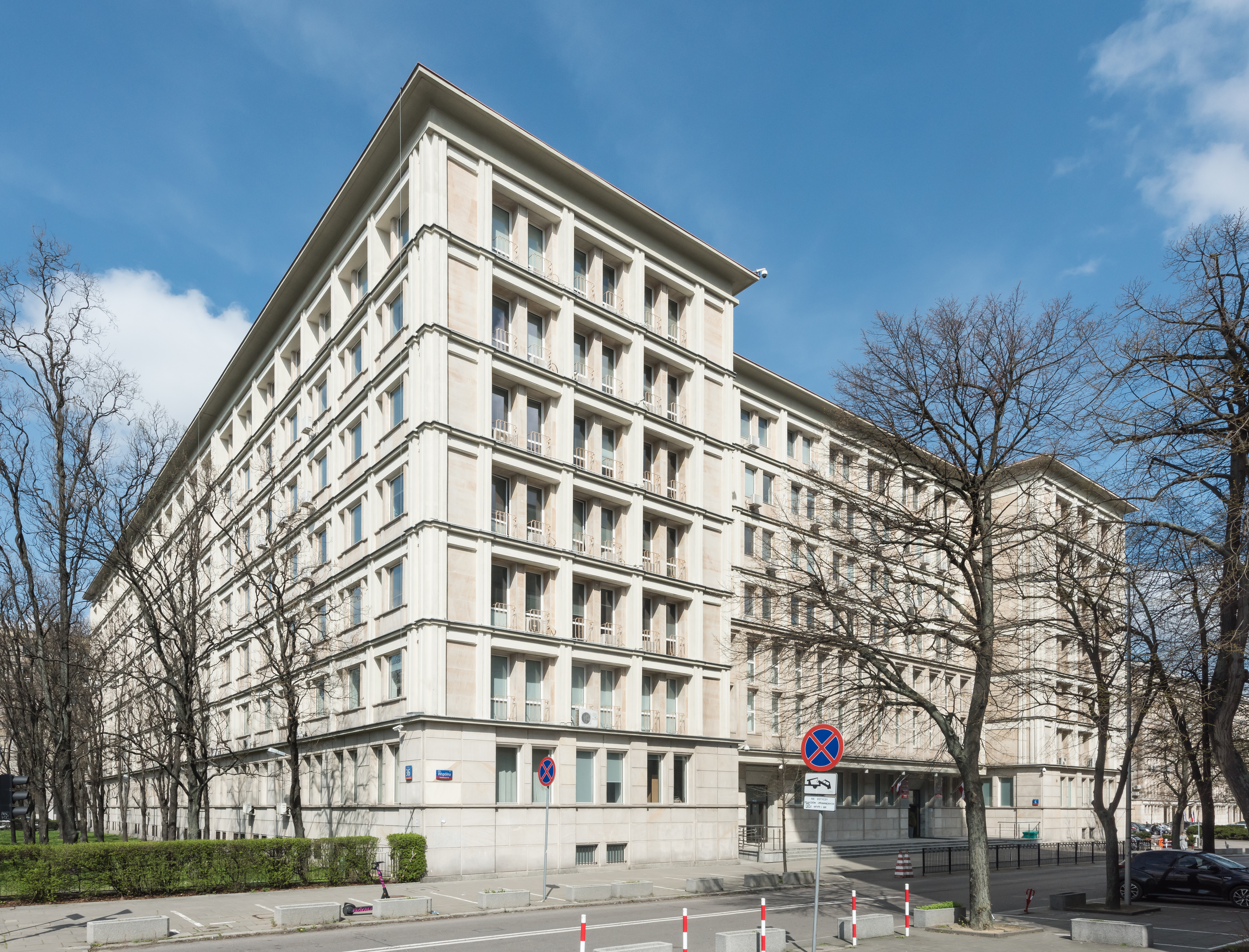
- Headquarters building in Warsaw

Agency overview
- Formed: 15 November 2019 (6 years ago)
- Preceding agency: Ministry of State Treasury
- Jurisdiction: Government of Poland
- Minister responsible: Wojciech Balczun, Minister of State Assets
- Parent agency: Council of Ministers
- Website: www.gov.pl/web/aktywa-panstwowe

The Ministry of State Assets (MAP) (Polish: Ministerstwo Aktywów Państwowych) is a Polish government administration office currently serving the minister responsible for two departments of government administration: state assets and communications. The ministry was established on November 15, 2019, following the transformation of the Ministry of Energy, and has undergone several reorganizations in subsequent years. The competency equivalent of the office before 2017 was the Ministry of State Treasury.

== History ==
The Ministry of State Assets was established on November 15, 2019, on the day the second Mateusz Morawiecki government was formed. The head of the new office became the then Deputy Prime Minister Jacek Sasin. The ministry began operations on November 19, 2019. The legal basis for its establishment was a regulation of the Council of Ministers issued on that day, which amended the regulation on the establishment of the Ministry of Energy. Initially, the minister's scope of activities remained unchanged and included managing two departments of government administration: energy and the economy of mineral deposits.

Transformations in the ministry occurred after the Act of January 23, 2020, amending the Act on Government Administration Departments came into force, which, among other things, created the new department of state assets. This amendment was essentially a return to solutions used before January 1, 2017, when the Treasury Department existed within the government administration, covering matters of a similar nature. Appropriate changes in the scope of ministers' activities and the structures serving their offices were made by regulations of the Prime Minister and the Council of Ministers of March 20, 2020. Since then, the Minister of State Assets has managed two departments of state administration: state assets and the economy of mineral deposits, while the matters of the energy department were transferred to the newly created Ministry of Climate.

Further changes were made under the Prime Minister's regulations of October 8, 2020, and the Council of Ministers' regulations of October 9, 2020, involving the transfer of the communications department to the Minister of State Assets, previously managed by the Minister of Infrastructure.

Following the formation of the third Donald Tusk government on December 13, 2023, the management of the mineral deposits economy department was removed from the Minister of State Assets' scope and transferred to the newly appointed Minister of Industry. The matters of handling this department were carried out by the Ministry of State Assets until March 1, 2024, when, based on a regulation of the Council of Ministers of February 20, 2024, the Ministry of Industry was established (with headquarters in Katowice in the former Directorate of the Prince of Pszczyna Mines building) by separating part of MAP's structures.

== Scope of activities ==
According to the provisions of the Act on Government Administration Departments, the scope of activities of the minister responsible for the departments of state assets and communications includes:

- Matters of managing state property, including exercising property and personal rights vested in the State Treasury, as well as protecting the interests of the State Treasury (excluding matters assigned to other departments by separate regulations);
- Matters of representing the State Treasury within the scope specified above;
- Matters of initiating state policy regarding the use of state property to ensure its rational and effective use, increase its value, and implement the state's economic policy;
- Matters of postal services.

== Management ==
- Wojciech Balczun – Minister of State Assets (since 24 July, 2024)
- Robert Kropiwnicki (PO) – Secretary of State (since December 13, 2023)
- Konrad Gołota (NL) – Undersecretary of State (since February 3, 2025)
- vacat – Director General
