= Dariusz Klimczak =

Polish minister of infrastructure

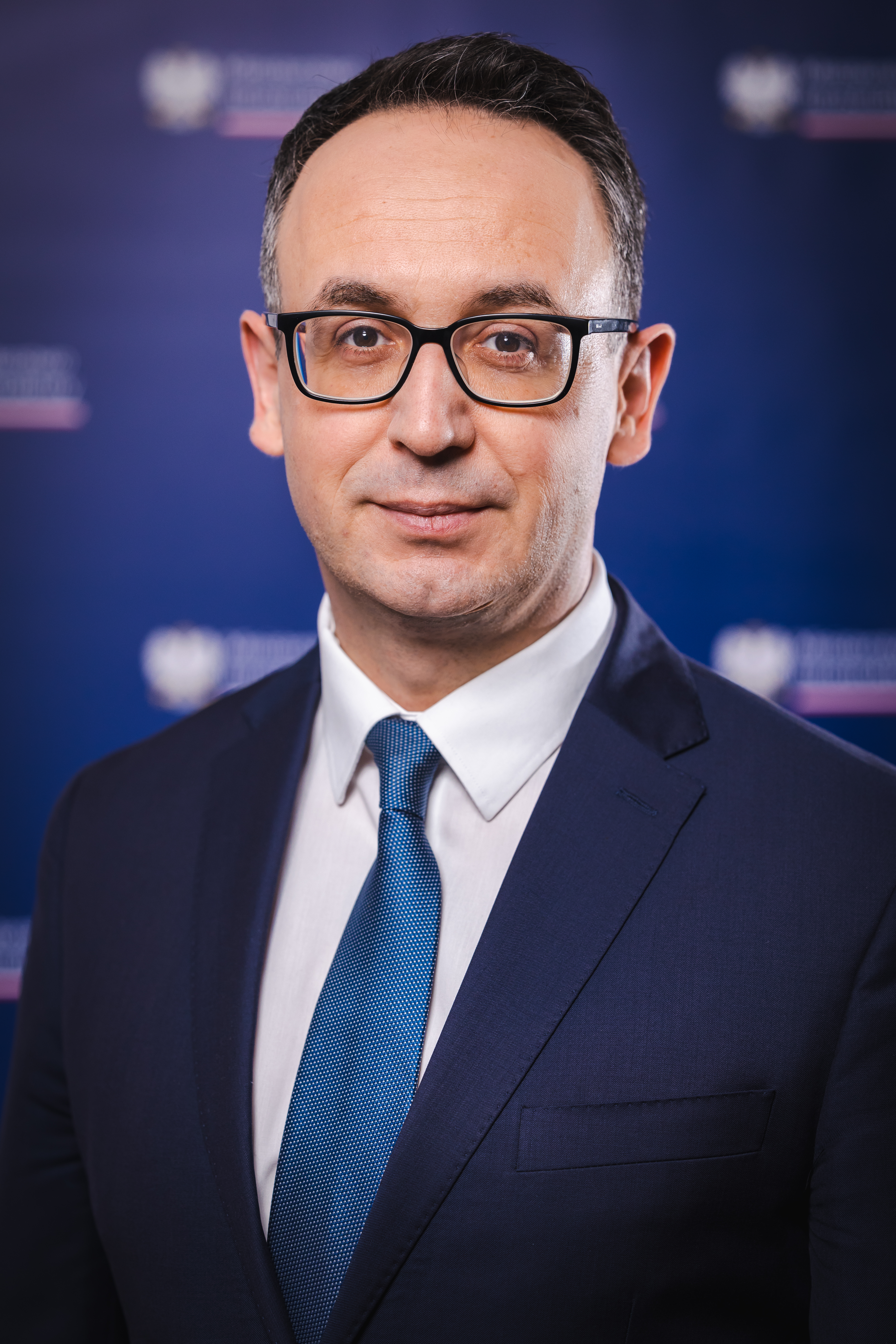
- Official portrait, 2024

Minister of Infrastructure
- Incumbent
- Assumed office 13 December 2023
- Prime Minister: Donald Tusk
- Preceded by: Alvin Gajadhur

Member of the Sejm
- Incumbent
- Assumed office 9 August 2019
- Constituency: Nr. 10

Personal details
- Born: 17 June 1980 (age 46) Rawa Mazowiecka, Poland
- Party: Polish People's Party (2002–present)
- Children: 2
- Education: Jagiellonian University; University of Warsaw

Dariusz Klimczak (born 17 June 1980) is a Polish politician who has been serving as Minister of Infrastructure under Prime Minister Donald Tusk in his third cabinet since 13 December 2023. He has also been the vice president of the Polish People's Party since 2015, and a member of the Sejm since 2019.

== Early life and education ==
Klimczak earned a magister degree from the faculty of history at Jagiellonian University in 2005. He earned a doctorate in political science from the University of Warsaw in 2008.

== Personal life ==
Klimczak is married and has two children. He is a volunteer firefighter.
