= Jakub Jaworowski =

Polish politician (born 1981)

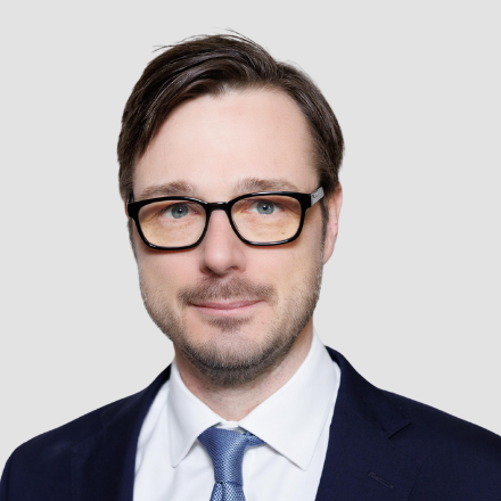
- Official portrait, 2024

Minister of State Assets
- In office 13 May 2024 – 23 July 2025
- Prime Minister: Donald Tusk
- Preceded by: Borys Budka
- Succeeded by: Wojciech Balczun

Personal details
- Born: 26 September 1981 (age 45)
- Education: SGH Warsaw School of Economics

Jakub Jaworowski (born 26 September 1981) is a Polish politician serving as minister of state assets from 2024 to 2025. In 2015, he served as secretary of state of the Chancellery of the Prime Minister.
