= Marzena Czarnecka =

Polish scholar, lawyer and Minister of Industry

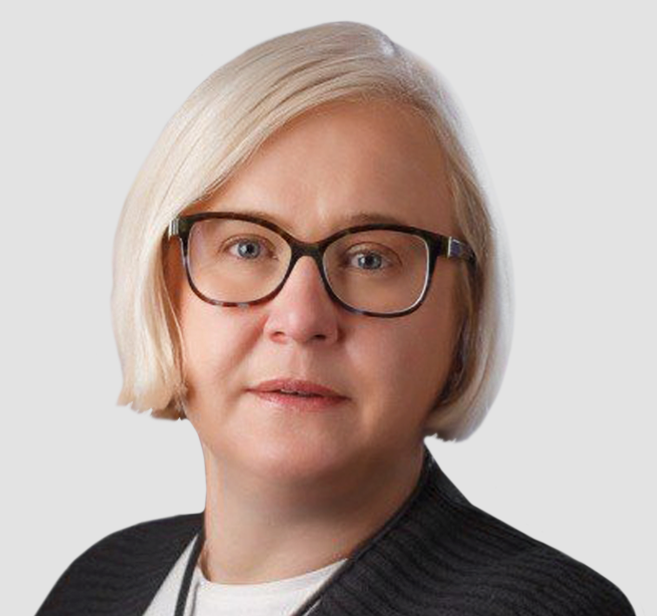
- Czarnecka in 2023

Minister of Industry
- In office 13 December 2023 – 23 July 2025
- Prime Minister: Donald Tusk
- Preceded by: Office established

Personal details
- Born: 17 November 1969 (age 56) Zabrze, Poland
- Education: University of Economics in Katowice

Marzena Czarnecka (born 17 November 1969) is a Polish professor at the University of Economics in Katowice, where she heads the Department of Energy Transformation.

Czarnecka has served as a minister of industry since 13 December 2023 in the Third Cabinet of Donald Tusk.

== Education ==
Czarnecka earned a magister degree from the faculty of law and administration at the University of Silesia in Katowice, and a doctorate from the University of Economics in Katowice.

Czarnecka was awarded her habilitation from the University of Economics in Katowice on 26 September 2019. Her thesis was titled Obowiązki informacyjne a zachowania konsumentów na rynku energii elektrycznej ('Informational duties and consumer behaviour on the electricity market'). Her work won her a Wielki Orzeł ('Big eagle') award from the University of Warsaw's Centre for Antitrust and Regulatory Studies.

== Career ==
In 1999, Czarnecka founded a law firm with Tomasz Ogłódek. From 2012 to 2017, she was the director of the legal department at Tauron Polska.

Since 2007, Czarnecka has served as a judge of the District Disciplinary Court at Katowice's District Chamber of Legal Advisors. In 2020, she was appointed a professor at the University of Economics in Katowice, where she heads the Department of Energy Transformation.

On 8 December 2023, Civic Platform leader and former prime minister Donald Tusk announced that he intended to appoint Czarnecka as the head of a new Ministry of Industry, to be based in Katowice. She would be responsible for the creation of the ministry, which would focus on coal mining, before the commercial availability of nuclear power in Poland.
