= Andrzej Domański =

Polish politician (born 1981)

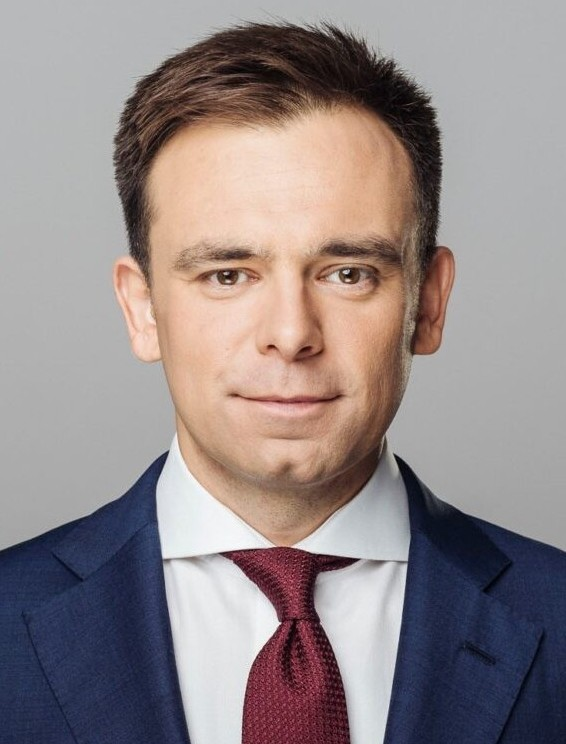
- Official portrait, 2023

Deputy Prime Minister of Poland
- Incumbent
- Assumed office 20 November 2026
- President: Karol Nawrocki
- Prime Minister: Donald Tusk

Minister of Finance and Economy (Note: Until 24 July 2025 as Minister of Finance)
- Incumbent
- Assumed office 13 December 2023
- President: Andrzej Duda; Karol Nawrocki
- Prime Minister: Donald Tusk
- Preceded by: Andrzej Kosztowniak

Member of the Sejm
- Incumbent
- Assumed office 13 November 2023
- Constituency: 19 (Warsaw)

Personal details
- Born: Andrzej Jan Domański; 27 August 1981 (age 45) Kraków, Poland
- Party: Civic Coalition
- Other political affiliations: Civic Coalition (political alliance)
- Education: Cracow University of Economics

Andrzej Domański (born 27 August 1981) is a Polish economist and politician. He has served as the Minister of Finance and Economy in the Cabinet of Donald Tusk since 13 December 2023, as well as the Deputy Prime Minister of Poland since 20 November 2026.

== Early life and education ==
Domański studied economics at the Kraków University of Economics. He later became a lecturer at both Łazarski University and SWPS University.

== Political career ==
Formerly a fund manager Domański stood for the Sejm in 2019 but was not elected after garnering just 1,329 votes.

Domański ran in the 2023 elections under the slogan Człowiek od gospodarki (transl. the economy guy). Despite being a new candidate for Civic Platform he was responsible for authoring their economic programme. In his election statement Domański noted that he had become involved in politics in part due to his daughter. He also stated his belief that investment in Poland's energy sector and economic growth are solutions to the climate crisis.

In April 2024, Domański expressed opposition to Poland joining the eurozone, saying that its retention of the złoty had helped the country avoid recession during the 2008 financial crisis.

Domański has been described as a Keynesian or a Neo-Keynesean, during his tenure.

== Other activities ==
- European Bank for Reconstruction and Development (EBRD), Ex-Officio Member of the Board of Governors (since 2023)
- European Investment Bank (EIB), Ex-Officio Member of the Board of Governors (since 2023)
- International Monetary Fund (IMF), Ex-Officio Member of the Board of Governors (since 2023)
