= Tomasz Siemoniak =

Polish politician

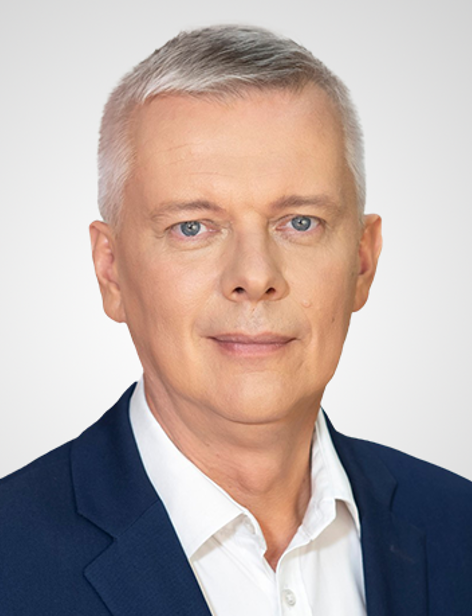
- Official portrait, 2024

Minister of the Interior and Administration
- In office 13 May 2024 – 24 July 2025
- Prime Minister: Donald Tusk
- Preceded by: Marcin Kierwiński
- Succeeded by: Marcin Kierwiński

Deputy Prime Minister of Poland
- In office 22 September 2014 – 16 November 2015
- Prime Minister: Ewa Kopacz
- Alongside: Janusz Piechociński
- Preceded by: Elżbieta Bieńkowska
- Succeeded by: Piotr Gliński; Jarosław Gowin; Mateusz Morawiecki

Minister of National Defence
- In office 2 August 2011 – 16 November 2015
- Prime Minister: Donald Tusk; Ewa Kopacz
- Preceded by: Bogdan Klich
- Succeeded by: Antoni Macierewicz

Member of Sejm
- Incumbent
- Assumed office 11 November 2015

Personal details
- Born: 2 July 1967 (age 59) Wałbrzych, Poland
- Party: Civic Coalition
- Education: Warsaw School of Economics
- Website: tomaszsiemoniak.com

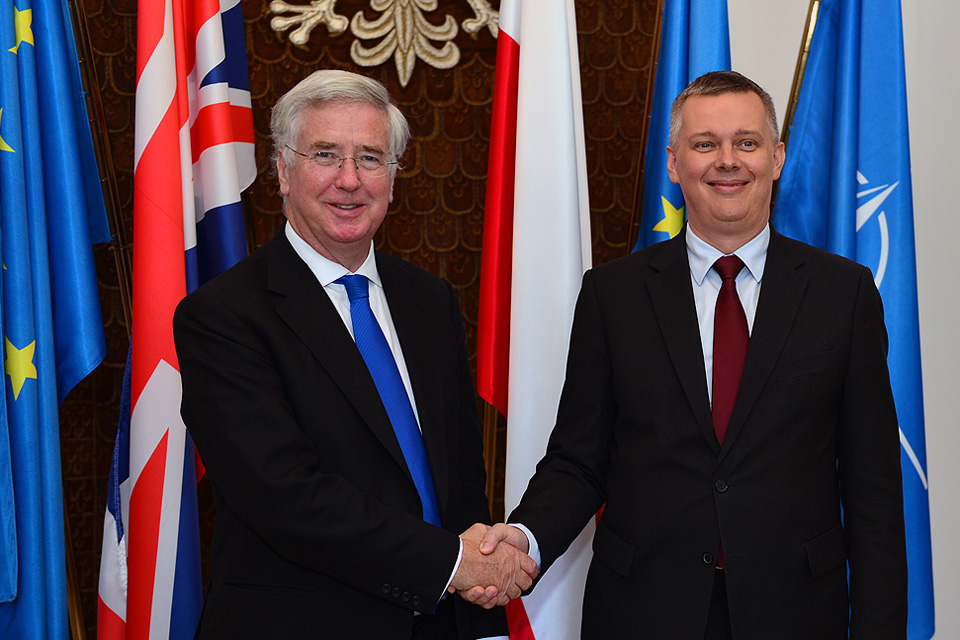
Siemoniak with Michael Fallon in 2014

Tomasz Siemoniak (Note: Polish pronunciation: ['tɔmaʂ ɕɛˈmɔɲak]) (born 2 July 1967) is a Polish politician of the Civic Platform (PO) who served as Minister of the Interior and Administration in the government of Donald Tusk from May 2024 to July 2025. He also served as Minister of National Defence in the governments of Prime Ministers Donald Tusk and Ewa Kopacz from 2 August 2011 to 16 November 2015 and as Deputy Prime Minister of Poland under Kopacz from 22 September 2014 to 16 November 2015.

== Early life and education ==
Siemoniak was born on 2 July 1967. He graduated from the Foreign Trade Faculty of the Warsaw School of Economics. He also studied at the University of Duisburg, where he went on a scholarship. During his university education, he was the head of the Independent Students' Association (NZS).

== Early career ==
Siemoniak began his career at the Polish public broadcasting unit, Telewizja Polska, as the director of the office for field branches and general director of TVP1. His tenure lasted from 1994 to 1996. He served as the director of the press and information office at the Ministry of National Defense from 1998 to 2000.

== Political career ==
=== Early beginnings ===
During his time at the Ministry of National Defense, Siemoniak was also a member of the Warsaw city centre district council and deputy chairman of the culture committee of the council. In this capacity, he was appointed deputy chairman of the supervisory board of the Polish News Agency in 1998, and his tenure ended in 2002. From December 2000 to July 2002 he was also deputy mayor of Warsaw. He was named as a board member of public radio company Polskie Radio SA in 2002 and served there until 2006.

Siemoniak later served as deputy marshal in the marshal's office of the Mazowieckie Voivodeship from November 2006 to November 2007.

=== Career in government ===
From November 2007 to August 2011, Siemoniak held the post of secretary of state in the Ministry of Interior and Administration under the leadership of successive ministers Grzegorz Schetyna and Jerzy Miller.

=== Minister of Defense, 2011–2015 ===
On 2 August 2011, Siemoniak was appointed Minister of National Defense in the cabinet led by Prime Minister Donald Tusk. Siemoniak replaced Bogdan Klich in the post. After the elections in October 2011, Tusk reshuffled his cabinet and Siemoniak retained his post as defense minister.

In December 2013, on Tusk's initiative, Siemoniak became a member of Civic Platform's board.

During his time in office as Minister of Defense, Siemoniak declared in August 2012 that Poland is planning to form its own missile defense system with an estimated budget of between $3 billion and $6 billion. By 2013, he oversaw Poland's biggest-ever increase in military equipment spending, with plans of investing $43 billion over the course of a decade in a procurement programme.

Also under Siemoniak's leadership, Poland accelerated the withdrawal of its troops from the International Security Assistance Force (ISAF) in Afghanistan over the course of 2014. Instead, Siemoniak called on NATO to station significant numbers of troops in eastern Europe after Russia's military intervention in Ukraine's Crimea peninsula. In 2015, he announced that Poland stood ready to assist the US should U.S. President Barack Obama decide to send arms to the Ukrainian military in its war against pro-Russian separatists.

=== Later career ===
In the 2019 elections, Siemoniak successfully ran for parliamentary re-election on behalf of the Civic Platform, receiving 45,395 votes.

In January 2020, Siemoniak announced his intention to run for the position as chairman of the Civic Platform, with the endorsement of outgoing leader Grzegorz Schetyna. As a result of the vote in the same month, he came in second place among four candidates with about 11% of the vote, losing to Borys Budka.

On 13 December 2023, he became minister-member of the Council of Minister (so called minister without portfolio). On 13 May 2024, he was nominated Minister of Internal Affairs and Administration. He was replaced by his predeccesor, Marcin Kierwiński on 24 July 2025 and now coordinates the secret services.

== Political positions ==
In 2015, Siemoniak criticized the government of Beata Szydło when it replaced the head of a NATO-affiliated Counter Intelligence Centre of Excellence in Warsaw and defence ministry officials and military police staged a night-time raid on its office; he denounced the raid as "unprecedented" and "probably the first time in NATO's history that an alliance member has attacked a NATO facility."

When the Szydło government revived discussions in 2017 on whether Poland could demand reparations from Germany for the damage and loss of life it suffered during World War II, Siemoniak told reporters that while Poland does have the right to seek compensation, the government's effort was a "propaganda game" that would worsen relations with Germany and end up helping Russia.

Ahead of the 2020 presidential elections, Siemoniak endorsed Małgorzata Kidawa-Błońska as the Civic Platform's candidate for President of Poland.

== Personal life ==
Siemoniak is married with two children.

Political offices
Preceded by Bogdan Klich	Minister of National Defence; 2011–2015	Succeeded by Antoni Macierewicz
Preceded by Elżbieta Bieńkowska	Deputy Prime Minister of Poland; 2014–2015	Succeeded by Piotr Gliński
