= Marta Cienkowska =

Polish politician (born 1987)

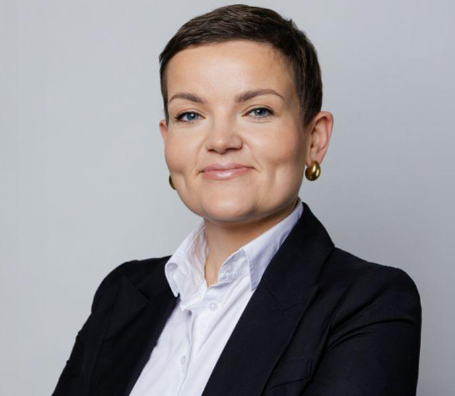
- Cienkowska in 2025

Minister of Culture and National Heritage
- Incumbent
- Assumed office 24 July 2025
- Prime Minister: Donald Tusk
- Preceded by: Hanna Wróblewska

Personal details
- Born: 14 November 1987 (age 38) Ciechanów, Polish People's Republic
- Party: Poland 2050
- Education: University of Warsaw

Marta Cienkowska (born 14 November 1987) is a Polish politician serving as Minister of Culture and National Heritage since July 2025, she also previously served as an Undersecretary of State in the Ministry of Culture and National Heritage from 2023 to 2025.

== Early life ==
Cienkowska was born in Ciechanów on 14 November 1987. She attended the University of Warsaw, where she studied political science and graduated in 2011 with a specialisation in European management.

Following her graduation from the University of Warsaw she received a diploma in 2014 from the Polish Academy of Sciences in the field of cultural management in the structures of the European Union. Later she also received a High Performance Leadership certificate from the Institute of Business Development.

== Political career ==
In the 2023 parliamentary election she ran on the Third Way ticket from the Poland 2050 party in the Płock constituency where she obtained 6528 votes. Though she has not managed to gain a seat in the Sejm due to only obtaining 1,48% of the vote in the constituency. She was appointed in December 2023 the Undersecretary of State in the Ministry of Culture and National Heritage a position which she held until 23 July 2025

On 23 July 2025 Prime Minister Donald Tusk announced the changes in the cabinet as a result of the cabinet reshuffle in which he announced that Marta Cienkowska would become the new Minister of Culture and National Heritage. She was officially inaugurated the next day by President Andrzej Duda.

In January 2026, Cienkowska oversaw the successful repatriation of the 12th century Polish manuscript the Collectarium of Ląd from the Beinecke Rare Book and Manuscript Library, Yale University. The repatriation process started in May 2024, and is part of an initiative that finalized 25 restitutions, and 200 pending cases across 18 nations to recover cultural assets lost and stolen during World War II.
