= Miłosz Motyka =

Polish politician (born 1992)

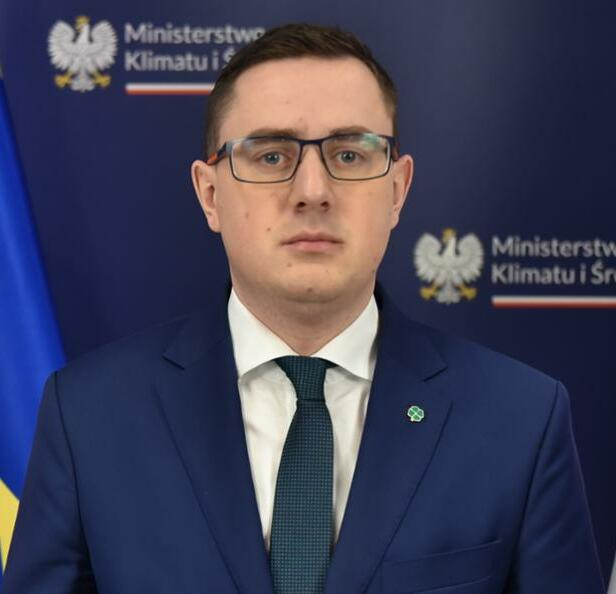
- Motyka in 2024

Minister of Energy
- Incumbent
- Assumed office 24 July 2025
- Prime Minister: Donald Tusk
- Preceded by: Office established

Personal details
- Born: 30 September 1992 (age 33) Myślenice, Poland
- Party: Polish People's Party

Miłosz Maksymilian Motyka (born 30 September 1992) is a Polish politician serving as minister of energy since 2025. From 2023 to 2025, he served as deputy minister of climate and environment.

Before heading the Ministry of Energy, he served as Undersecretary of State at the Ministry of Climate and Environment starting in December 2023, where he managed renewable energy policies and grid integration. In 2026, he oversees grid modernization, which is aimed at replacing aging overhead lines and supporting low-carbon generation. He advocates a multi-pillar approach anchored by nuclear power, offshore and onshore wind, photovoltaics, and temporary gas usage to bridge coal phase-outs.
