= Ministry of Energy (Poland) =

Government ministry of Poland

- Ministerstwo Energii
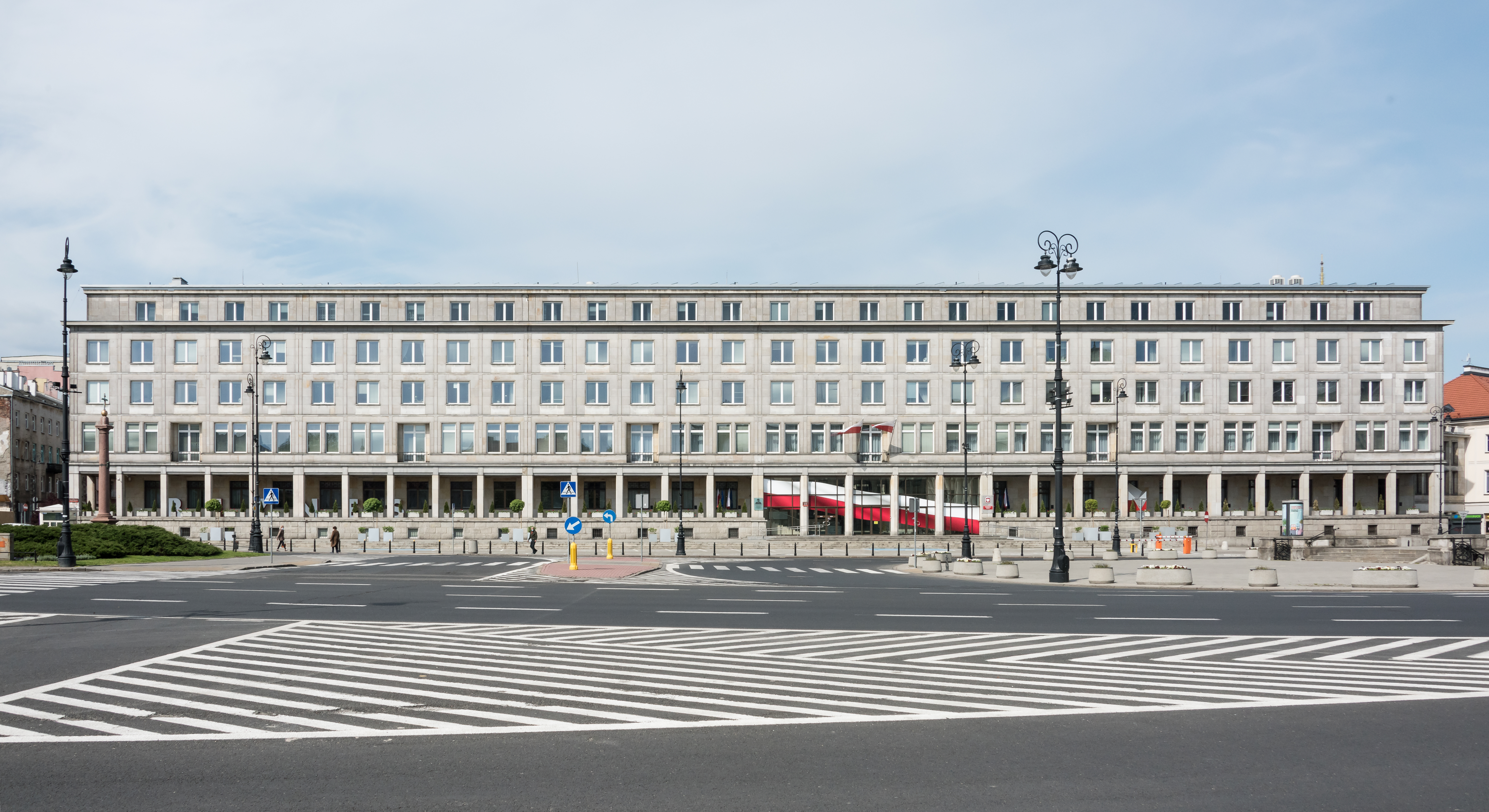

Agency overview
- Formed: 24 July 2025
- Headquarters: ul. Krucza 36/Wspólna 6, Warsaw
- Minister responsible: Miłosz Motyka, Minister of Energy
- Website: gov.pl

Ministry of Energy (Polish: Ministerstwo Energii) is the office of government in Poland responsible for energy policy and the management of mineral deposits. It was formed in late 2015 from the split of the Ministry of Infrastructure and Development and dissolved in 2019. It was re-established on July 24, 2025, after the reshuffle of Donald Tusk's government.
