= Wojciech Balczun =

Polish politician (born 1970)

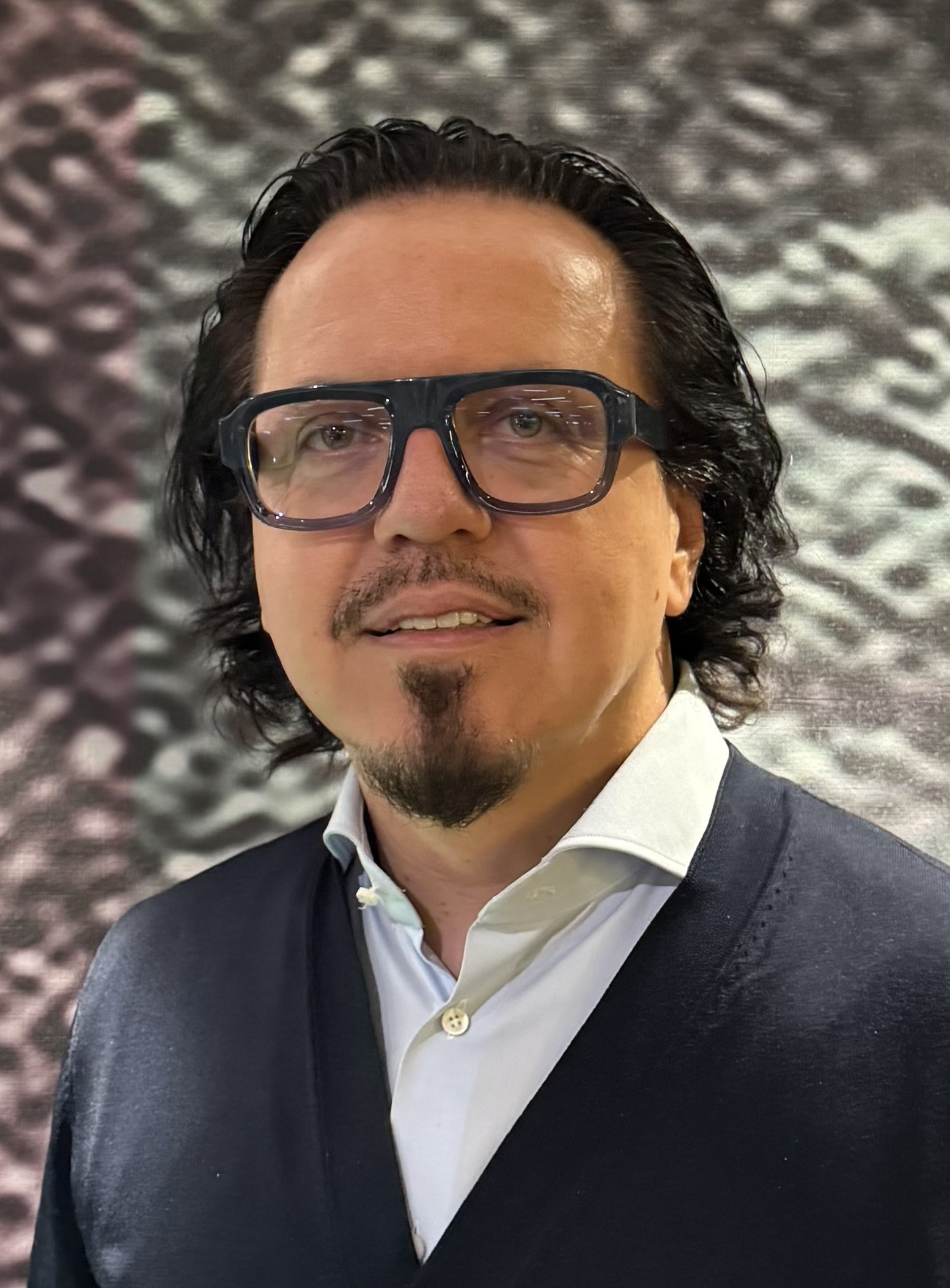
- Balczun in 2025

Minister of State Assets
- Incumbent
- Assumed office 23 July 2025
- Prime Minister: Donald Tusk
- Preceded by: Jakub Jaworowski

Personal details
- Born: 19 June 1970 (age 55)

Wojciech Balczun (born 19 June 1970) is a Polish politician serving as minister of state assets since 2025. From 2016 to 2017, he served as chairman of Ukrainian Railways. From 2008 to 2013, he served as president of PKP Cargo.
