= New Left (Poland) =

Polish centre-left political party

New Left Nowa Lewica
- Leader: Włodzimierz Czarzasty
- General Secretary: Marcin Kulasek
- Founded: 9 October 2021
- Registered: 27 January 2020
- Merger of: Democratic Left Alliance; Spring
- Headquarters: Złota 9, lok. 4; 00-019 Warsaw
- Youth wing: Młoda Lewica
- Membership (2025): ~25,000
- Ideology: Social democracy Social liberalism
- Political position: Centre-left (Note: One source describes the party as centrist.)
- National affiliation: The Left; Senate Pact 2023 (for 2023 Senate election)
- European affiliation: Party of European Socialists
- European Parliament group: Progressive Alliance of Socialists and Democrats
- International affiliation: Progressive Alliance
- Colours: Purple; Bordeaux; Red
- Slogan: Serce mam po lewej 'My heart is on the left'
- Sejm: 18 / 460
- Senate: 7 / 100
- European Parliament: 3 / 53
- Regional assemblies: 8 / 552
- City Presidents: 9 / 107

Website
- lewica.org.pl

The New Left (Polish: Nowa Lewica [ˈnɔva lɛˈvi.t͡sa], NL) is a social democratic political party in Poland. Positioned on the centre-left of the political spectrum, its leader is Włodzimierz Czarzasty.

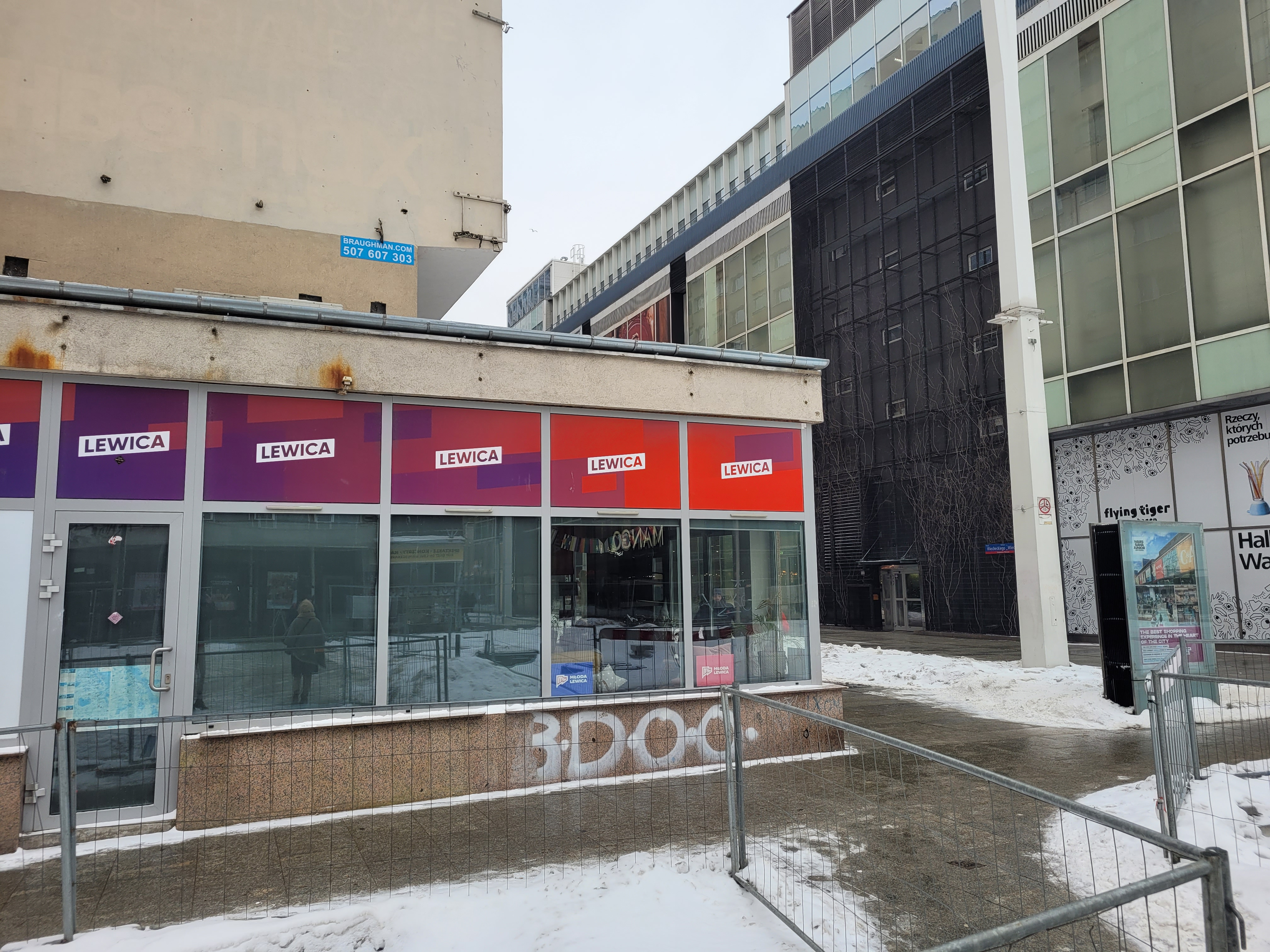
Lewica party office, Warsaw city center, Złota street 94

It was formed in 2021 with the unification of the Democratic Left Alliance (SLD) and Spring, although the plans for the merger began in 2019. It is a part of The Left coalition. It holds pro-European views. The New Left is the main party representing Poland's historical left, being the direct legal successor of the SLD, Social Democracy of the Republic of Poland and the Polish United Worker's Party.

== History ==
Spring and the Democratic Left Alliance (SLD) initially cooperated in 2019 during the October 2019 parliamentary election, as part of The Left alliance. After the election, the plan to merge the two parties was announced. As a consequence, in 2020, SLD changed its name to the New Left as the new party was to be based on the structures of the alliance. However, further plans concerning merger were postponed due to the COVID-19 pandemic.

On 11 June 2021, the Spring's general assembly voted in favour of dissolving the party in order to merge with the SLD.

In the 2023 Polish parliamentary election, The Left coalition technically participated as the New Left party, whose list included representatives of Left Together, Labour Union, Polish Socialist Party and Social Democracy of Poland. It joined the four-party coalition that nominated Donald Tusk as its candidate for prime minister. It received four seats in Tusk's cabinet, with Krzysztof Gawkowski as a deputy premier. It is the first time a left-wing party has been in government since the SLD's last government was defeated in 2005.

== Leadership ==
=== Party leaders ===
№	Leader(s)		Tenure
1			9 October 2021 – 14 December 2025
1	Włodzimierz Czarzasty	Robert Biedroń	9 October 2021 – 14 December 2025
Dual internal party organisation and dual leadership abolished.
2		Włodzimierz Czarzasty	14 December 2025 – present

=== Deputy leaders ===
The incumbent deputy leaders elected in December 2025 are:

- Krzysztof Gawkowski (first deputy chairperson)
- Agnieszka Dziemianowicz-Bąk
- Katarzyna Kotula
- Joanna Scheuring-Wielgus
- Wiesław Szczepański
- Dariusz Wieczorek
- Karolina Zioło-Pużuk
- Aneta Złocka
- Anna Maria Żukowska

== Election results ==
=== Sejm ===
Election	Leader	Popular vote	% of votes	Seats	+/−	Government	Ref
2023	Włodzimierz Czarzasty, Robert Biedroń	1,859,018 (#4)	8.61	19 / 460	New	PiS Minority (2023)	
2023	Włodzimierz Czarzasty, Robert Biedroń	1,859,018 (#4)	8.61	19 / 460	New	KO–PL2050–PSL–NL (2023–2026)	
2023	Włodzimierz Czarzasty, Robert Biedroń	1,859,018 (#4)	8.61	19 / 460	New	KO–PSL–NL–PL2050–C (2026–present)	
2023	As part of The Left coalition, which won 26 seats in total. (Note: The officially registered as Nowa Lewica (New Left) party list also included candidates of other The Left coalition parties. The list belong to the wider Senate Pact for the Senate election.)						

=== Senate ===
Election	Leader	Popular vote	% of votes	Seats	+/−	Majority	Ref
2023	Włodzimierz Czarzasty, Robert Biedroń	1,131,639 (#4)	5.29	7 / 100	New	KO–TD–L	
2023	As part of The Left coalition, which won 9 seats in total.						

=== European Parliament ===
Election	Leader	Popular vote	% of votes	Seats	+/−	Ref
2024	Włodzimierz Czarzasty, Robert Biedroń	741,071 (#5)	6.30	3 / 53	New	
2024	As part of The Left coalition, which won 3 seats in total.					

=== Regional Assemblies ===
Election	Leader	Popular vote	% of votes	Seats	+/−	Ref
2024	Włodzimierz Czarzasty, Robert Biedroń	911,430 (#5)	6.32	7 / 552	New	
2024	As part of The Left coalition, which won 8 seats in total.					
