= Katarzyna Kotula =

Polish politician, teacher and social activist (born 1977)

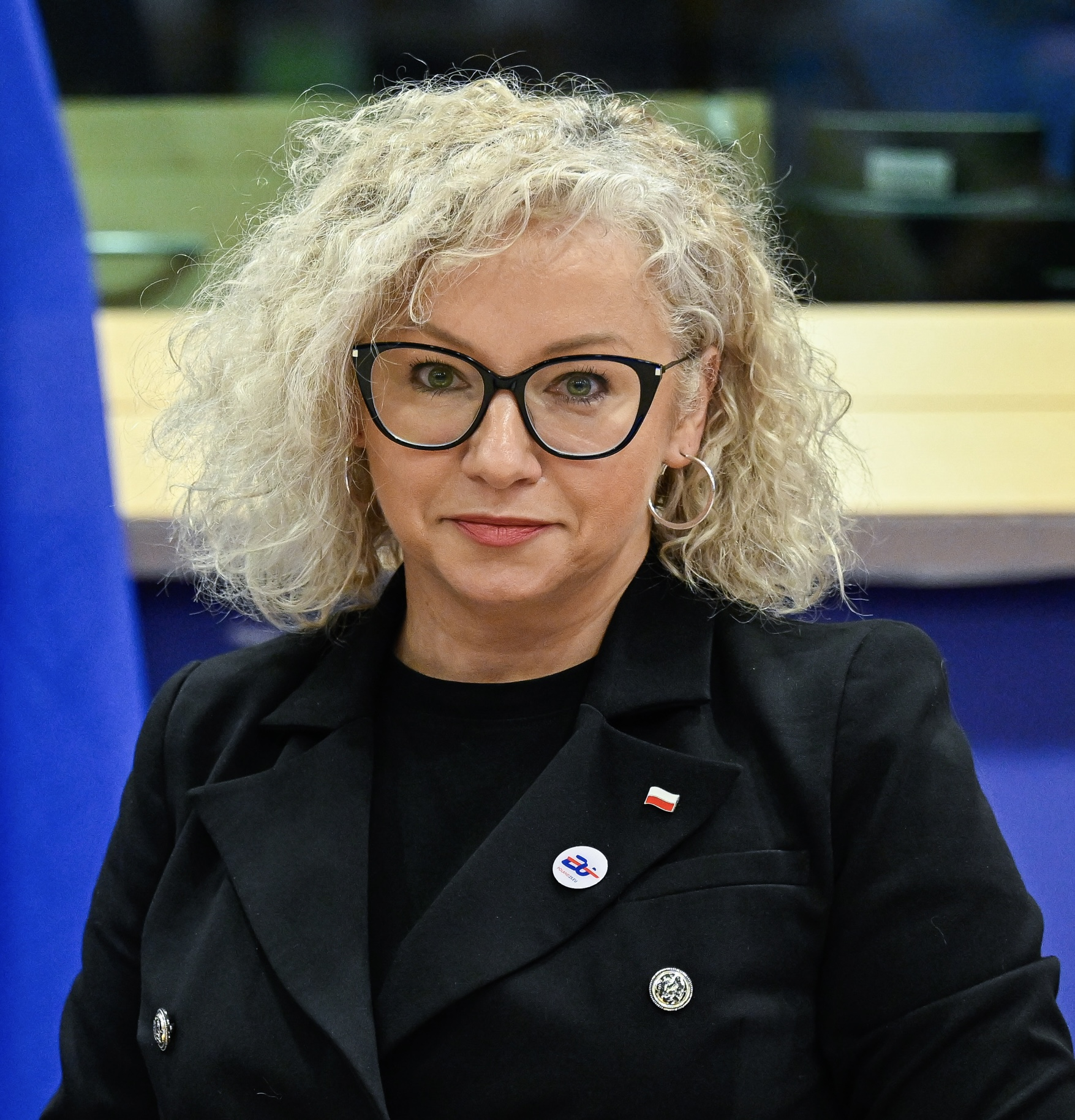
- Kotula in 2025

Secretary of State in the Chancellery of the Prime Minister of Poland
- Incumbent
- Assumed office 25 July 2025
- Prime Minister: Donald Tusk

Member of the Sejm of Poland
- Incumbent
- Assumed office 12 November 2019
- Constituency: Gdańsk (2023–present); Szczecin (2019–2023)

Minister for Equality of Poland
- In office 13 December 2023 – 24 July 2025
- Prime Minister: Donald Tusk
- Preceded by: Office established
- Succeeded by: Office abolished

Personal details
- Born: 1 February 1977 (age 49) Gryfino, Poland
- Party: New Left (2021–present); Spring (2019–2021)
- Education: Collegium Balticum
- Occupation: Politician; teacher; social activist

Katarzyna Agata Kotula (Polish: [ka.taˈʐɘ̟.na aˈɡa.ta kɔˈtu.la]; born 1 February 1977) is a Polish politician, teacher, and social activist. Since 2019, she is a member of Sejm of Poland, from 2023 to 2025, she was the Minister of Equality of Poland. She is a member of the New Left party, and one of the leaders of the All-Poland Women's Strike movement.

== Biography ==
Katarzyna Kotula was born on 1 February 1977 in Gryfino, Poland. Her father moved to Berlin in 1980, with the rest of the family following him later on. She returned to Poland with her mother and brother in 1986. Years later, her family moved back to Germany.

As a child, she played tennis, and by the age of 13, she began training in the club Energetyk Gryfino. As stated in 2022, there she was sexually molested by her trainer, Mirosław Skrzypczyński, member and future chairperson of the Polish Tennis Association. Later, for a few years Kotula has lived in Utah, United States, where she attended highschool, and was hosted by a local family.

From 2019 Kotula's official parliamentary website profile stated that she had achieved a master's degree in English studies at the Adam Mickiewicz University in Poznań in 2016. In January 2025 it was revealed by the university that she had not obtained such diploma, however studied there between 2013 and 2017. In response Kotula claimed that the untrue information must have been a result of an error and that she graduated with bachelor's degree from the Collegium Balticum, a private university in Szczecin. In 2019 she reportedly told the press that she is writing her doctorate work.

For about 20 years, she was a teacher and an owner of a private school of English in Gryfino. She was also a teacher in a public school.

She has participated in the Women's Congress, political and social movement for women's rights, and took part in the founding of the Jesteśmy social committee of the caretakes of disabled people. Kotula is one of the leaders of the All-Poland Women's Strike movement, and its activist in Grifino. She is also a member of the association Spójnik.

In 2019, she was involved in the formation of the Spring left-wing party, and became its local coordinator in Grifino. She has unsuccessfully candidated in the 2019 European Parliament elections from the Lubusz and West Pomeranian constituency, in which she had received 3,143 votes.

In the 2019 parliamentary election, Kotula had successfully candidated to be a member of the Sejm of Poland. She run from the mandate of the Democratic Left Alliance in the constituency no. 41 consisting of the western portion of the West Pomeranian Voivodeship. She had received 7,557 votes. She became deputy chairperson of the Commission of the Member of Parliament Matters and Immunity, and a member of the Commission of Social and Family Politics. In October 2020, she became spokesperson of the Spring. In June 2021, her party was incorporated into then-established New Left, and in November of that year, she became the co-chairperson of the party division in the West Pomeranian Voivodeship. She was re-elected for the Sejm in the 2023 election, this time running from the constituency no. 25 consisting of the eastern portion of the Pomeranian Voivodeship. She had received 33,122 votes. She became chairperson of the Commission of Social and Family Politics.

On 12 December 2023, Prime Minister Donald Tusk had nominated her to the office of the Minister for Equality. She was appointed the next day by President Andrzej Duda. In January 2024, she became member of the Social Dialogue Council. She was dismissed as minister as a result of a government reconstruction following the 2025 Polish presidential election.

== Private life ==
Kotula is in a relationship with a male partner with whom she has one daughter.
