= Hanna Wróblewska =

Polish politician (born 1968)

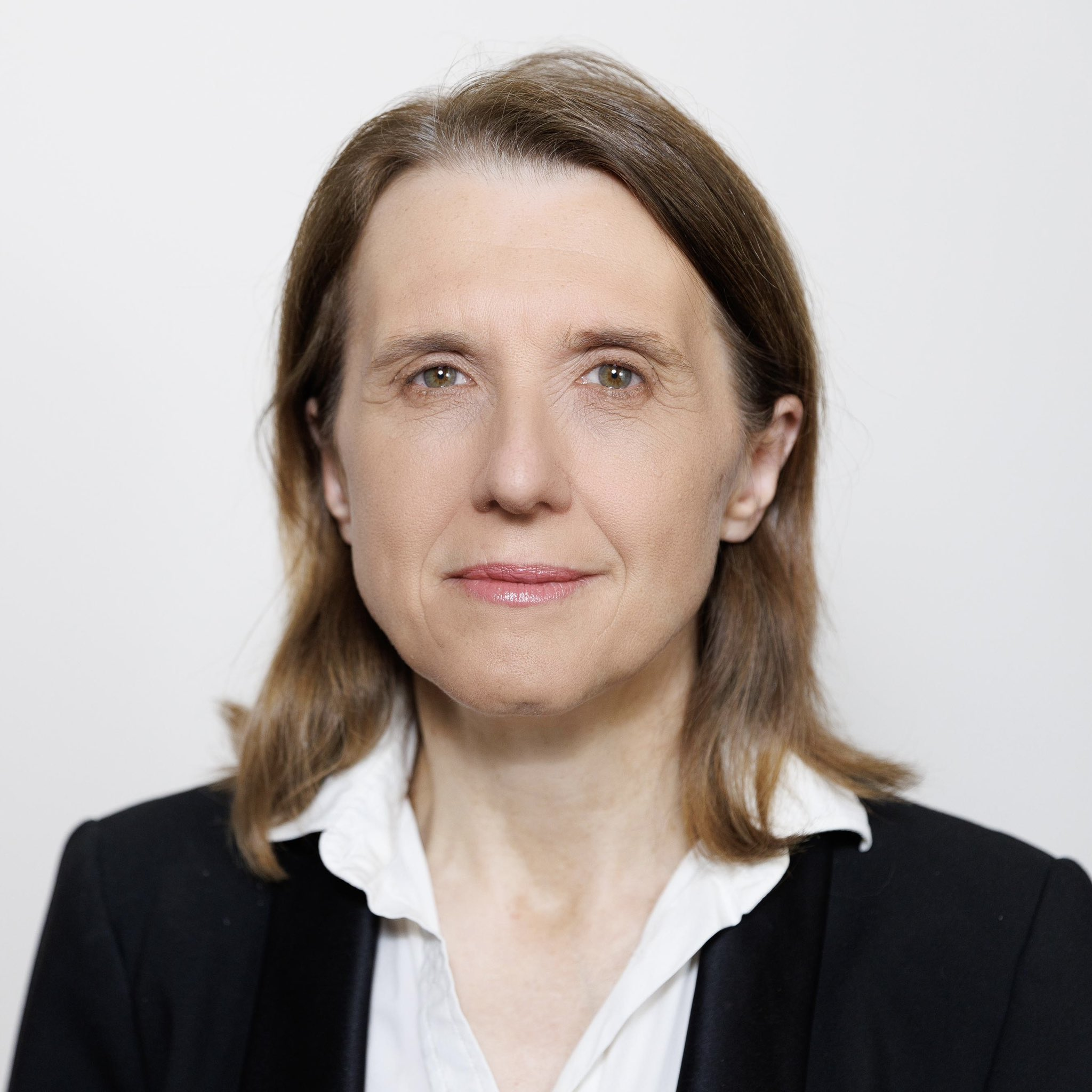
- Wróblewska in 2024

Minister of Culture and National Heritage
- In office 13 May 2024 – 24 July 2025
- Prime Minister: Donald Tusk
- Preceded by: Bartłomiej Sienkiewicz
- Succeeded by: Marta Cienkowska

Personal details
- Born: 5 June 1968 (age 58)
- Party: Independent
- Education: University of Warsaw

Hanna Wróblewska (born 5 June 1968) is a Polish art historian and politician who served as minister of culture and national heritage from 2024, until 2025. From 2010 to 2021, she served as director of the Zachęta – National Gallery of Art.
