= Marzena Okła-Drewnowicz =

Polish politician (born 1972)

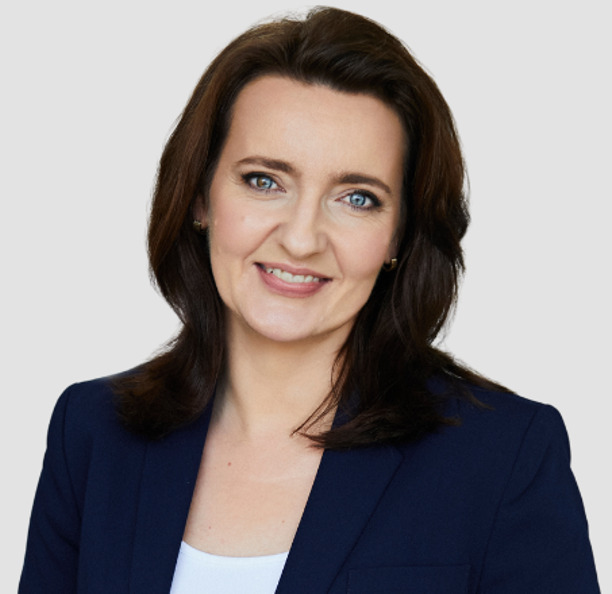
- Okła-Drewnowicz in 2023

Secretary of State in the Chancellery of the Prime Minister of Poland
- Incumbent
- Assumed office 25 July 2025

Minister for Senior Citizens Affairs
- In office 13 December 2023 – 24 July 2025
- Prime Minister: Donald Tusk
- Preceded by: Office established

Member of the Sejm
- Incumbent
- Assumed office 5 November 2007
- Constituency: Kielce

Personal details
- Born: 20 May 1972 (age 53)
- Party: Civic Platform

Marzena Okła-Drewnowicz (born 20 May 1972) is a Polish politician, from 2023 to 2025, she held the office of the Minister of Senior Citizens Affairs She has been a member of the Sejm since 2007.
