= Marcin Kierwiński =

Polish politician (born 1976)

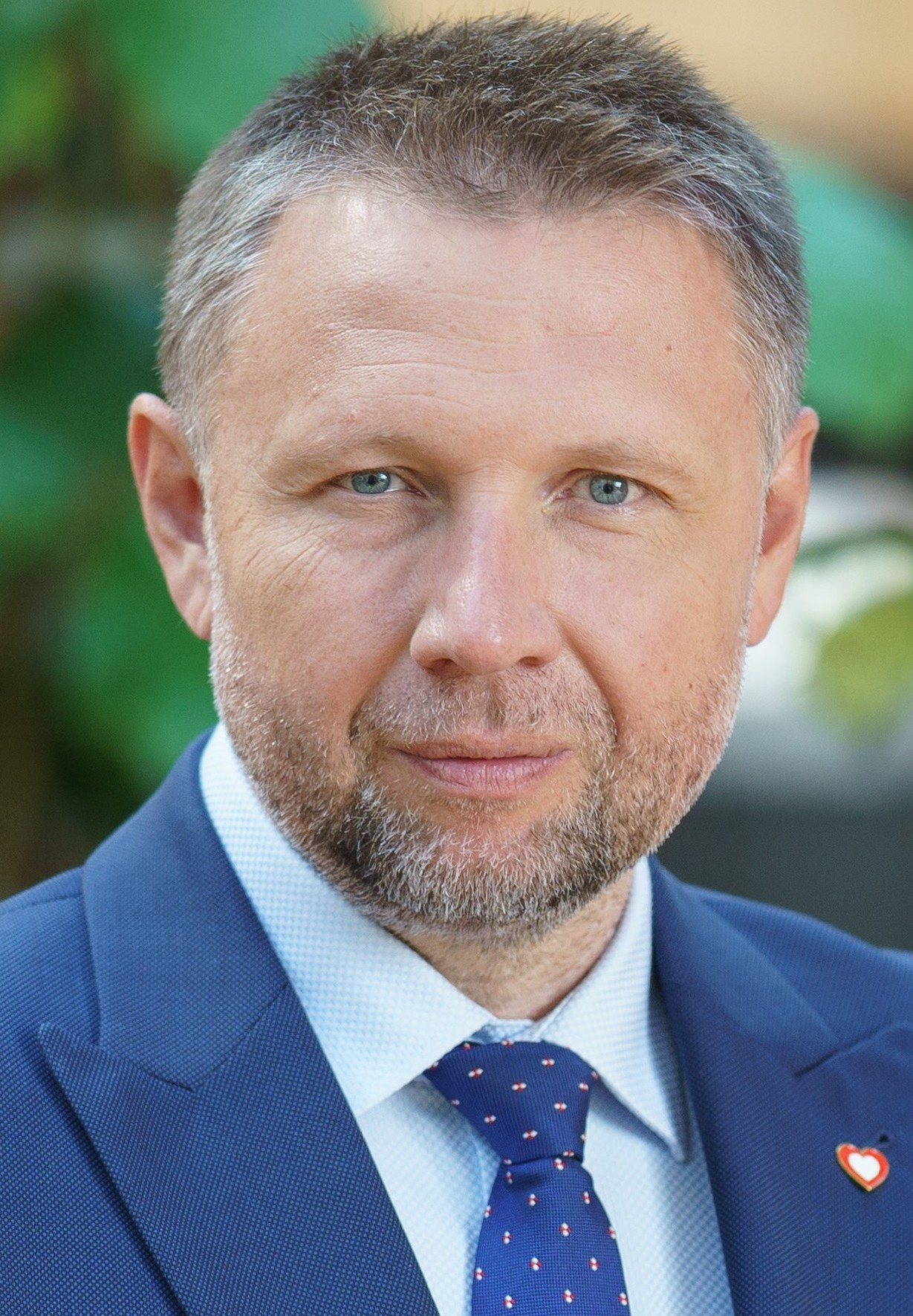
- Kierwiński in 2024

Minister of Internal Affairs and Administration
- Incumbent
- Assumed office 24 July 2025
- Prime Minister: Donald Tusk
- Preceded by: Tomasz Siemoniak
- In office 13 December 2023 – 13 May 2024
- Prime Minister: Donald Tusk
- Preceded by: Paweł Szefernaker
- Succeeded by: Tomasz Siemoniak

Member of the European Parliament for Warsaw
- In office 16 July 2024 – 26 September 2024
- Succeeded by: Hanna Gronkiewicz-Waltz

Head of the Political Cabinet of the Prime Minister
- In office 3 February 2015 – 16 November 2015
- Preceded by: Jolanta Gruszka
- Succeeded by: Elżbieta Witek

Member of the Sejm
- In office 8 November 2011 – 10 June 2024
- Succeeded by: Maria Koźlakiewicz

Personal details
- Born: 22 August 1976 (age 50) Warsaw, Poland
- Party: Civic Platform (2001–present)
- Education: Warsaw University of Technology

Marcin Piotr Kierwiński (Note: Polish pronunciation: [ˈmart͡ɕin kʲɛrˈvij̃skʲi]) (born 22 August 1976) is a Polish politician, local government official, who is currently serving as the Minister of Internal Affairs and Administration since 2025 for the second time, having previously held that office from December 2023 to May 2024.

== Early life and education ==
Marcin Piotr Kierwiński was born on 22 August 1976 in Warsaw. In 2001, he graduated from the Warsaw University of Technology with a master's degree in biomedical electronics engineering. In 2002, he earned a second master's degree in management and marketing from the same university. In 2003, he completed a postgraduate course in IT infrastructure management at the ORGMASZ Institute of Organisation and Management in Industry.

== Managerial career ==
Kierwiński worked at Optimus, a Polish electronics company, and at the Military Institute of Aviation Medicine. From 2000 to 2007, he was an employee of PZL Warszawa-Okęcie, an aviation company. In 2007, he became vice president of the executive board of IF Max-Film, a local cinema chain. From 2007 to 2010, he also served as vice president of the executive board of Warsaw Modlin Airport.

== Political career ==
He served as the Deputy Marshal of the 3rd and 4th term of Masovia from 2010 to 2011, Member of Sejm of the 7th, 8th, 9th and 10th term, secretary of state in the Prime Minister's Chancellery and head of the political cabinet of Prime Minister Ewa Kopacz in 2015 and general secretary of the Civic Platform from 2020.

He was elected as a Member of the European Parliament in May 2024. He subsequently resigned to re-enter the Council of Ministers in September to coordinate activities related to the reconstruction of flood-affected areas after the 2024 European floods.
