= Marcin Kulasek =

Polish politician (born 1976)

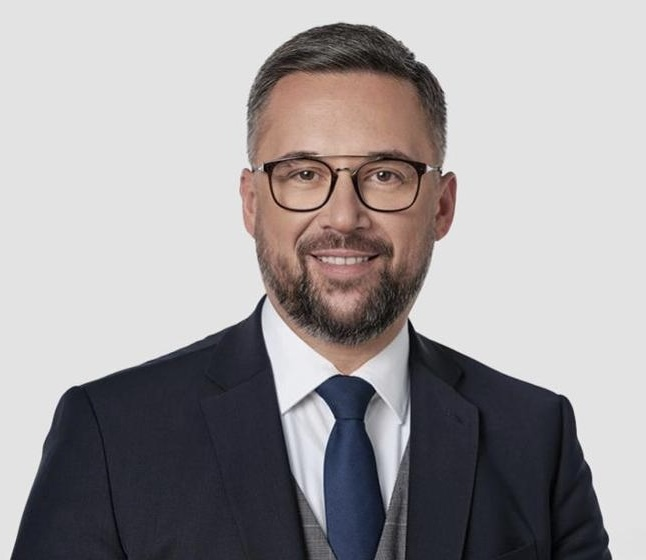
- Kulasek in 2025

Minister of Science and Higher Education
- Incumbent
- Assumed office 17 January 2025
- Prime Minister: Donald Tusk
- Preceded by: Dariusz Wieczorek

Member of the Sejm
- Incumbent
- Assumed office 12 November 2019
- Constituency: Olsztyn

Personal details
- Born: 4 April 1976 (age 50)
- Party: New Left (since 2021)
- Other political affiliations: Democratic Left Alliance (until 2021)

Marcin Kulasek (born 4 April 1976) is a Polish politician serving as minister of science and higher education since 2025. He has been a member of the Sejm since 2019. He served as secretary general of the Democratic Left Alliance from 2016 to 2021, and has served as secretary general of the New Left since 2021.
