= Dariusz Wieczorek =

Polish politician

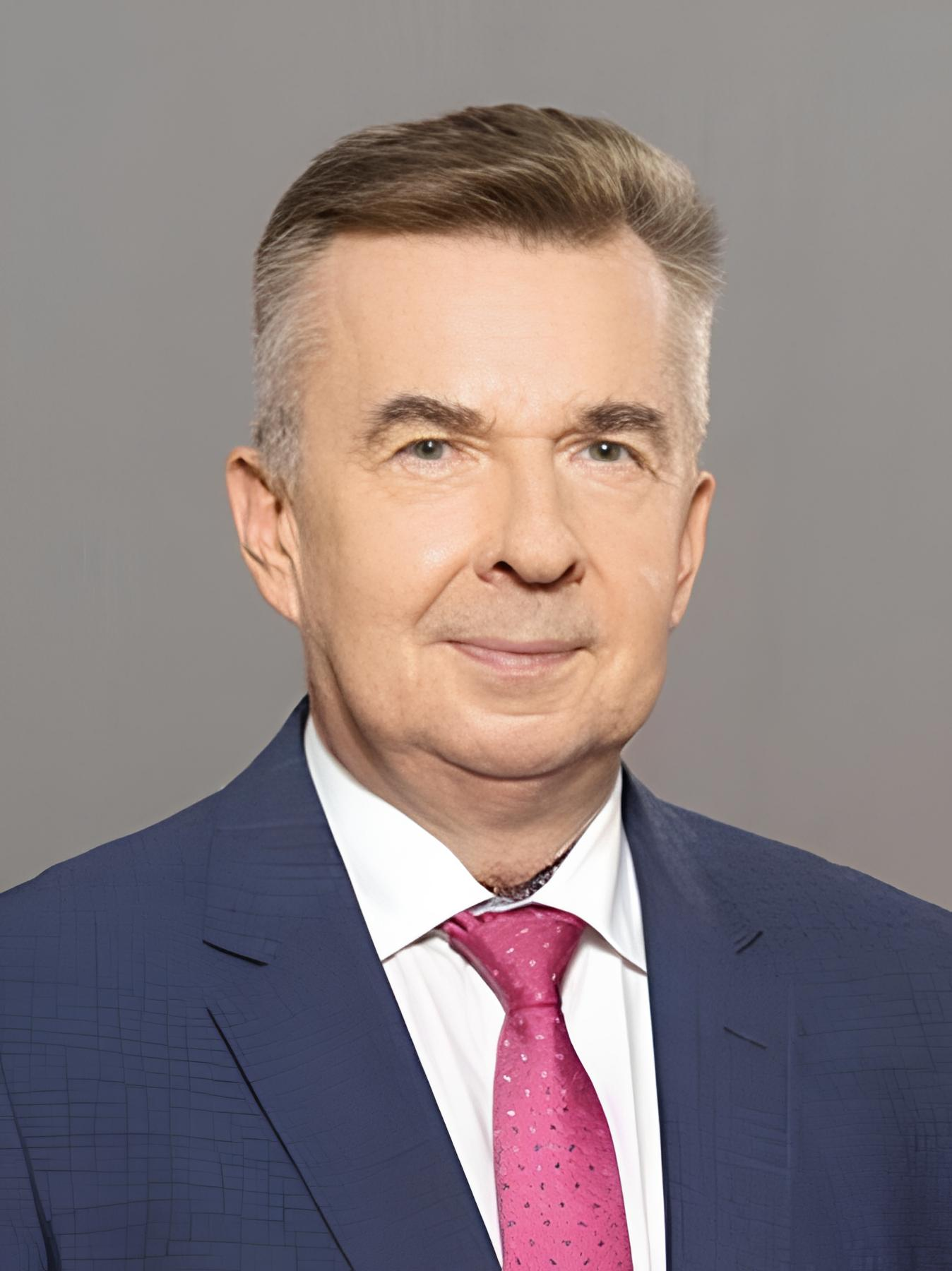
- Wieczorek in 2024.

Minister of Science
- In office 13 December 2023 – 17 January 2025
- Prime Minister: Donald Tusk
- Preceded by: Krzysztof Szczucki
- Succeeded by: Marcin Kulasek

Member of the Sejm of Poland
- Incumbent
- Assumed office 12 November 2019
- Constituency: No. 41

Member of the West Pomeranian Voivodeship Sejmik
- In office 2010–2018
- In office 2002–2006
- Constituency: No. 1

Deputy mayor of Szczecin
- In office 1998–2001

Member of the City Council of Szczecin
- In office 1994–2002

Personal details
- Born: 23 May 1965 (age 61) Szczecin, Poland
- Party: New Left (2021–present)
- Other political affiliations: Democratic Left Alliance (1999–2021)
- Children: 1
- Education: Szczecin University of Technology; Poznań University of Economics and Business; University of Szczecin
- Occupation: Politician, Electrical engineer; Tourist industry manager; Musician

Dariusz Krzysztof Wieczorek (Note: Polish pronunciation: [ˈda.rjuʂ ˈkʂɘʂ.tɔf vjɛˈt͡ʂɔ.rɛk]) (born 23 May 1965) is a politician, electrical engineer, local government official, and tourism activist. Since 2019, he has been a member of the Sejm of Poland from constituency no. 41, which consists of the western portion of the West Pomeranian Voivodeship, and was a Minister of Science from 2023 to 2025. Since 2021, he is one of the vice-chairpeople of the New Left party, and previously he was a vice-chairperson of the Democratic Left Alliance from 2016 to 2020. From 2002 to 2006, and from 2010 to 2018, he was a member of the West Pomeranian Voivodeship Sejmik, from 1998 to 2001, a deputy mayor of Szczecin, and from 1994 to 2002, a member of the City Council of Szczecin.

== Biography ==
Dariusz Wieczorek was born on 23 May 1965 in Szczecin, Poland. He graduated the Maria Skłodowska-Curie 1st High School in Szczecin. He studied energetics at the Szczecin University of Technology, from which he graduated in 1989 as the Master of Engineering. At the time, he was a member of the Polish Students' Association. Later, he also studied the organization and management of tourist economics at the Poznań University of Economics and Business, from which he graduated in 1994, and the administrative and local government law at the University of Szczecin, from which he graduated in 2001.

He worked in various tourist institutions, including as the section director of the Almatur foundation, and in the Main Centre of Tourist Information (Polish: Centralny Ośrodek Informacji Turystycznej), as well as the general director of the Regional Agency of Tourist Promotion (Polish: Regionalna Agencja Promocji Turystyki). He was a chairperson of the Szczecińska Energetyka Cieplna (Szczecin Thermal Energetics), a member of the management of Enea company, and a director of the business section of the ENEA Operator.

He joined the Democratic Left Alliance, and became a chairperson of its structures in the West Pomeranian Voivodeship. From 1994 to 2002, he was a member of the City Council of Szczecin, and from 1998 to 2001, he was the deputy mayor of Szczecin. In 2000, he was awarded the Golden Cross of Merit for his involvement in the student movement.

On 31 December 1998, the local government of Szczecin, led by mayor Marian Jurczyk, canceled a contract with Euroinvest Saller to build a hypermarket in the city, that was agreed upon with a previous government. As such, the investor was returned 5 million Polish złoty with interest, which it originally paid to the city as a down payment. In 2005, Jurczyk, as well as six other members of the city government, including Wieczorek, were charged with failure to fulfill their obligations, and endangering the city for significant financial losses. On 5 July 2007, the district court in Szczecin sentenced Jurczyk and Wieczorek to two years of imprisonment with the suspended sentence with five years of the trial period. Additionally, they were fined and prohibited from occupying specific positions in the public administration, and obligated them to fix caused damages. In 2008, the appellate court repealed the previous court decision, and remanded the case. In December 2009, all seven people charged in the case were acquitted by the court.

From 2002 to 2006, and from 2010 to 2018, he was a member of the West Pomeranian Voivodeship Sejmik from constituency no. 1, which consists of the city of Szczecin and Police County. In 2011 and 2015, he unsuccessfully ran for the office of a member of the Seym of Poland from constituency no. 41, which consists of the western portion of the West Pomeranian Voivodeship. In 2016, he became the vice-chairperson of the Democratic Left Alliance.

On 19 July 2019, the Democratic Left Alliance became a part of The Left political alliance. Wieczorek was elected in the 2019 parliamentary election to be a member of the Seym of Poland, from constituency no. 41. His term of office began on 12 November 2019. He gained 24 924 votes in the election. While in office, he became a member of the Maritime Economy and Inland Shipping Committee and the Energy, Climate, and State Assets Committee, as well as the secretary of The Left parliamentary group. On 9 October 2021, the Democratic Left Alliance united with the Spring, forming the New Left party. Upon the creation of the party, he was elected to be one of 14 co-vice-chairpeople of the New Left.

He was re-elected in the 2023 parliamentary election to be a member of the Seym, from constituency no. 41.

On December 12, 2023, the 10th Sejm elected him as the Minister of Science in Donald Tusk's third government. The following day, he was appointed to the position by President Andrzej Duda. In January 2024, he was also appointed to the Social Dialogue Council by the president.

His tenure at the Ministry of Science and Higher Education sparked numerous controversies due to a series of irregularities widely reported in the media:

- Allegations of Favoritism (5 December 2024): Journalists from Wirtualna Polska accused Dariusz Wieczorek of using his position to secure professional benefits for his wife, an academic at the University of Szczecin. The allegations included amending university regulations and facilitating payments to the university rector’s account. Minister Wieczorek dismissed the claims, stating that the article was an attack on his family and that the regulatory changes were unrelated to the accusations.
- Whistleblower Data Disclosure (12 December 2024): Another article by Wirtualna Polska detailed allegations of the unauthorized disclosure of a whistleblower’s personal data despite her objections. Minister Wieczorek defended the ministry's actions, asserting that they were lawful and unrelated to whistleblower protections, as the relevant legislation had not yet come into effect. He described the ministry's approach as "absolutely pro-union" and denied any intention to resign. Following the controversy, the ministry's spokesperson resigned on December 16, 2024. The parliamentary club of Law and Justice announced plans to file a motion of no confidence against the minister.
- Asset Declaration Inaccuracies (16 December 2024): Wirtualna Polska revealed inaccuracies in Minister Wieczorek’s asset declaration. Journalists reported that he had incorrectly listed a two-hectare plot of land using square meters instead of hectares and omitted a parking space valued at tens of thousands of złoty. Previous declarations had used the correct units. Minister Wieczorek apologized for the errors. In response, Prime Minister Donald Tusk promised to take action regarding the matter.

On 19 December 2024, Wieczorek resigned from his position.

== Personal life ==
Dariusz Wieczorek has a wife and a son. He is a drummer of a rock and heavy metal band Vinders, founded in 1979.

== Orders and decorations ==
- Golden Cross of Merit (2000)
