= Next Polish parliamentary election =

- By 11 November 2027

All 460 seats in the Sejm 231 seats needed for a majority
- Opinion polls
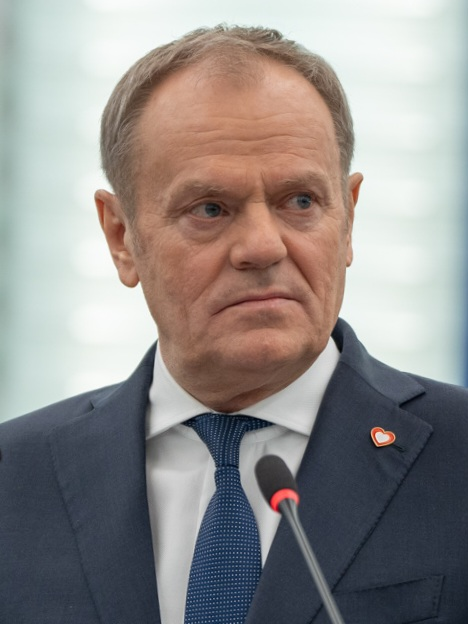

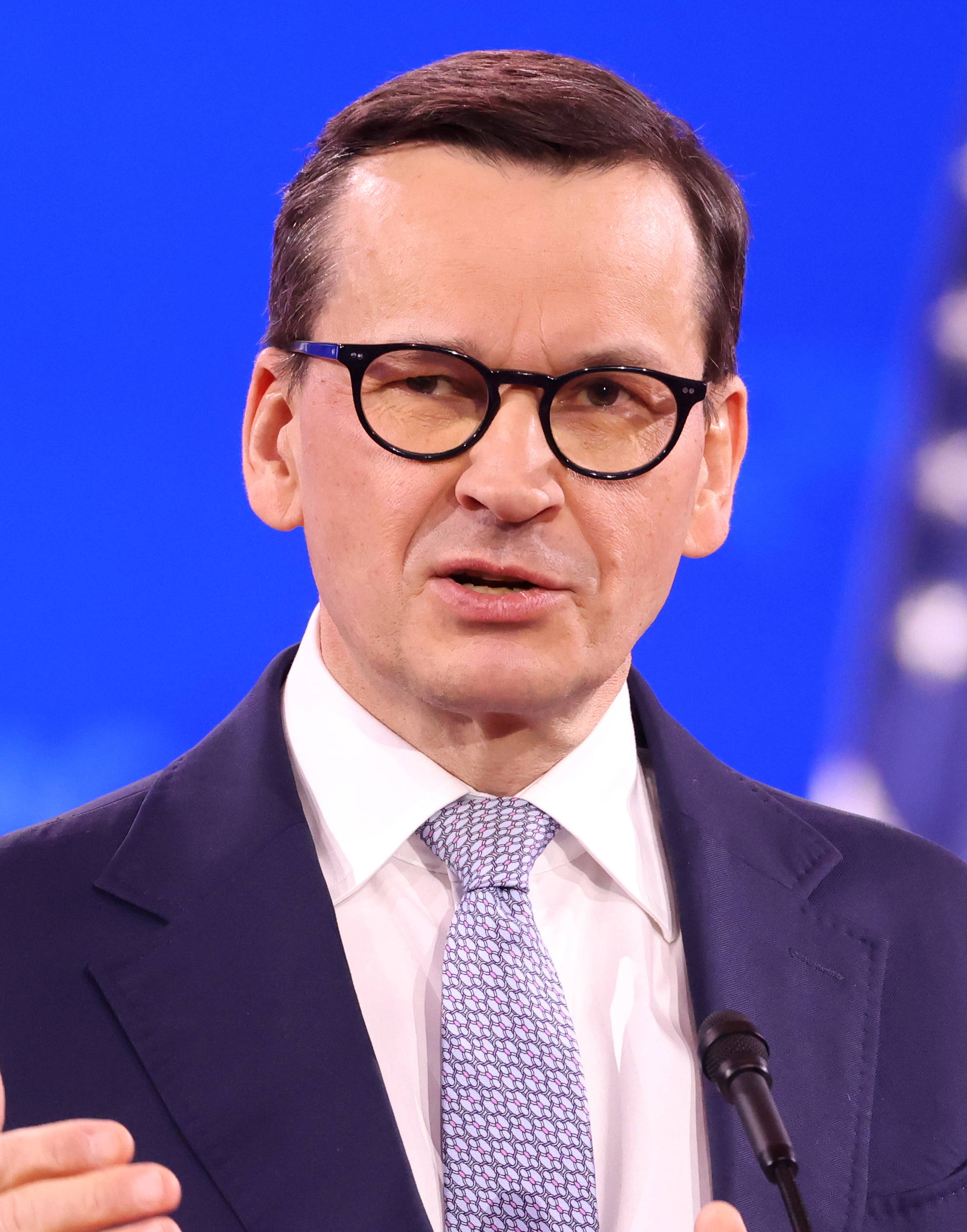

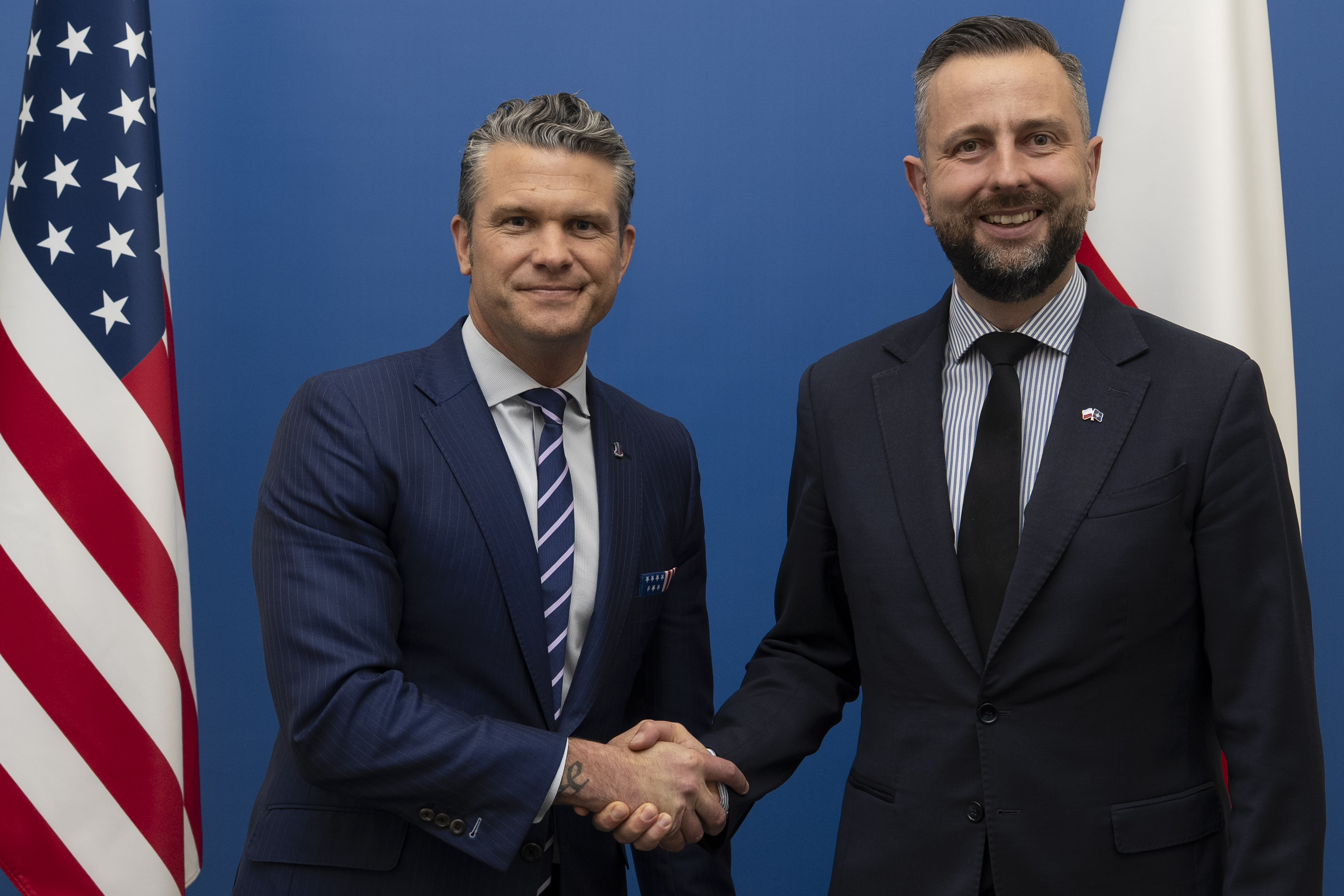

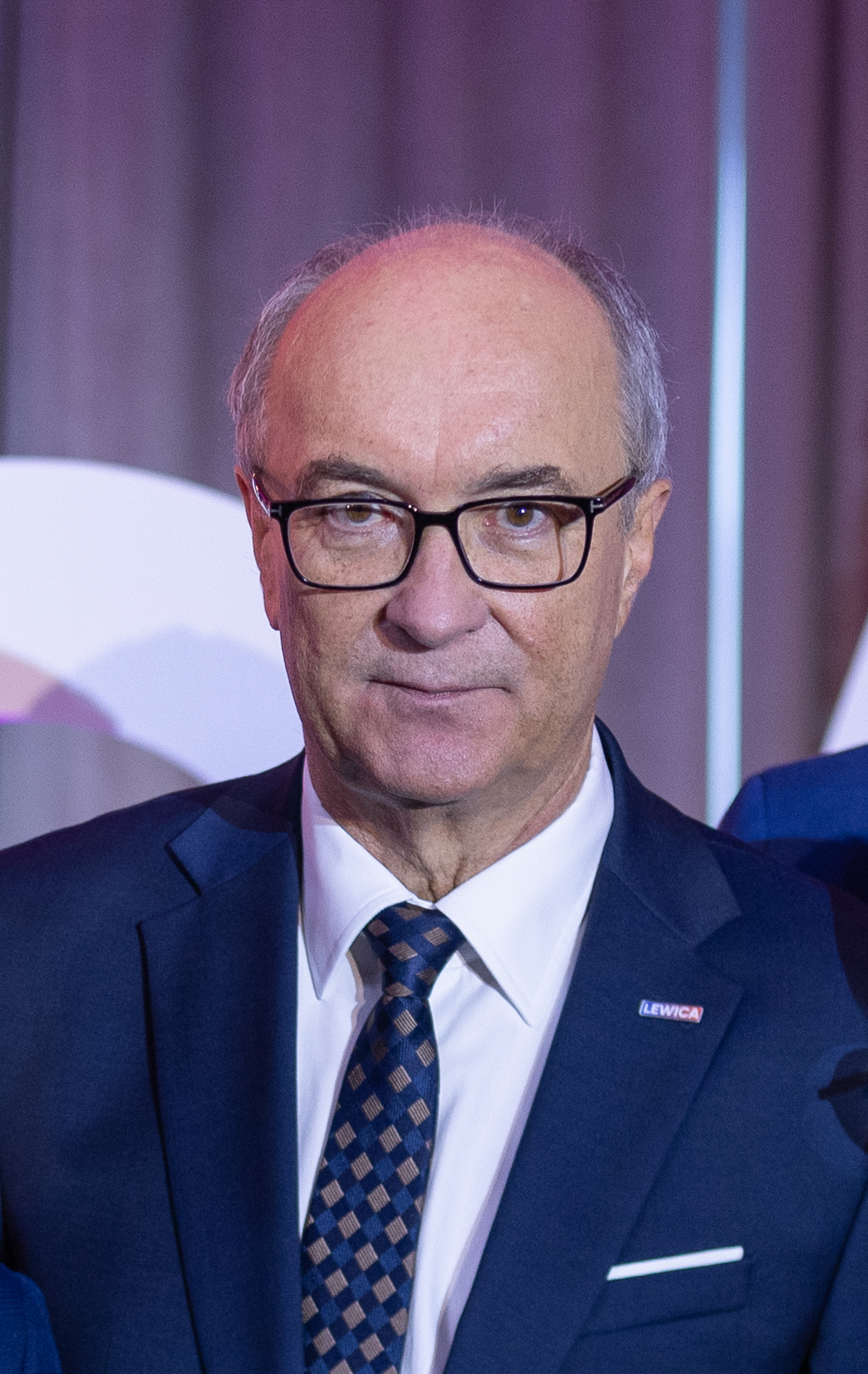

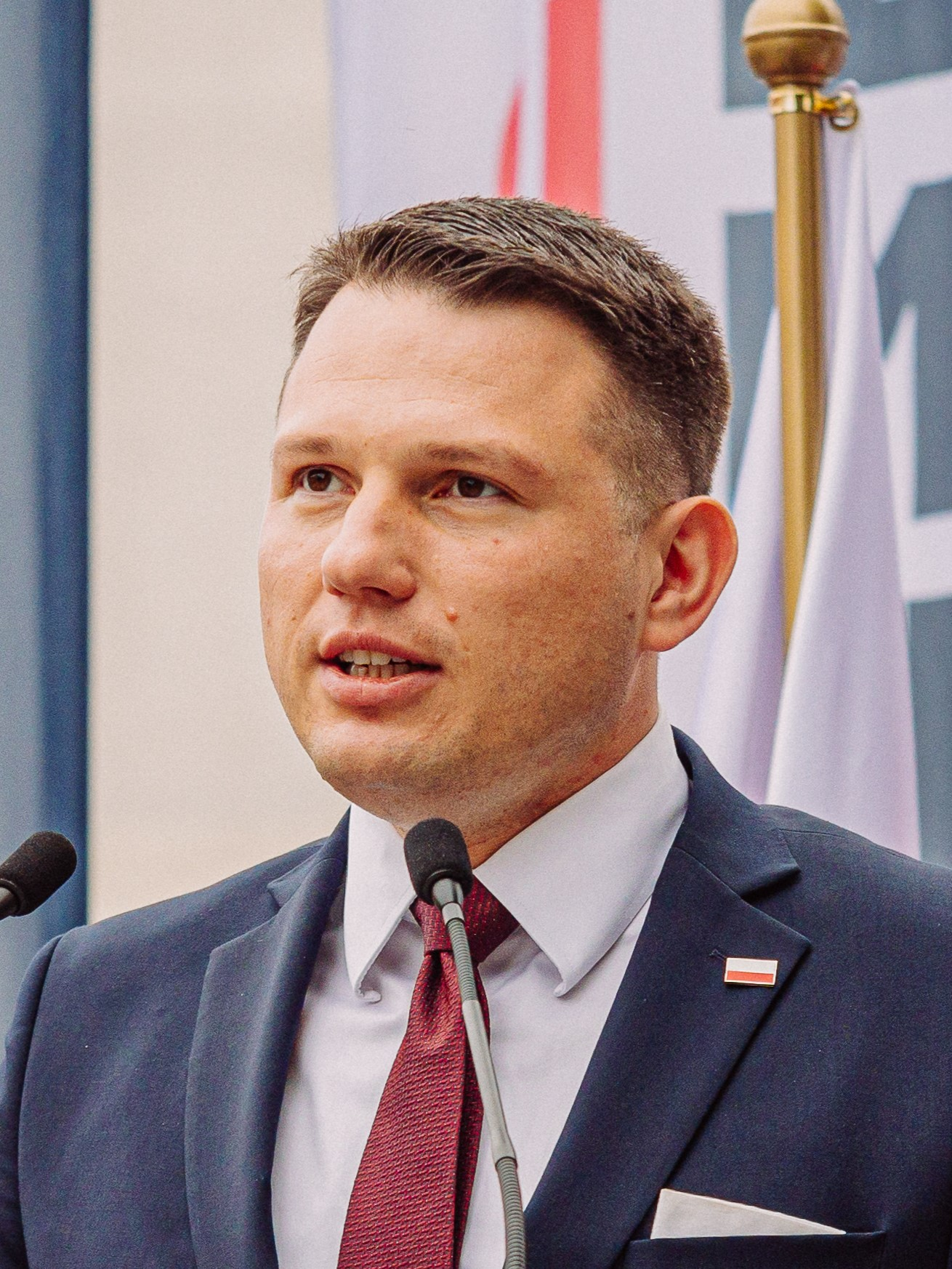

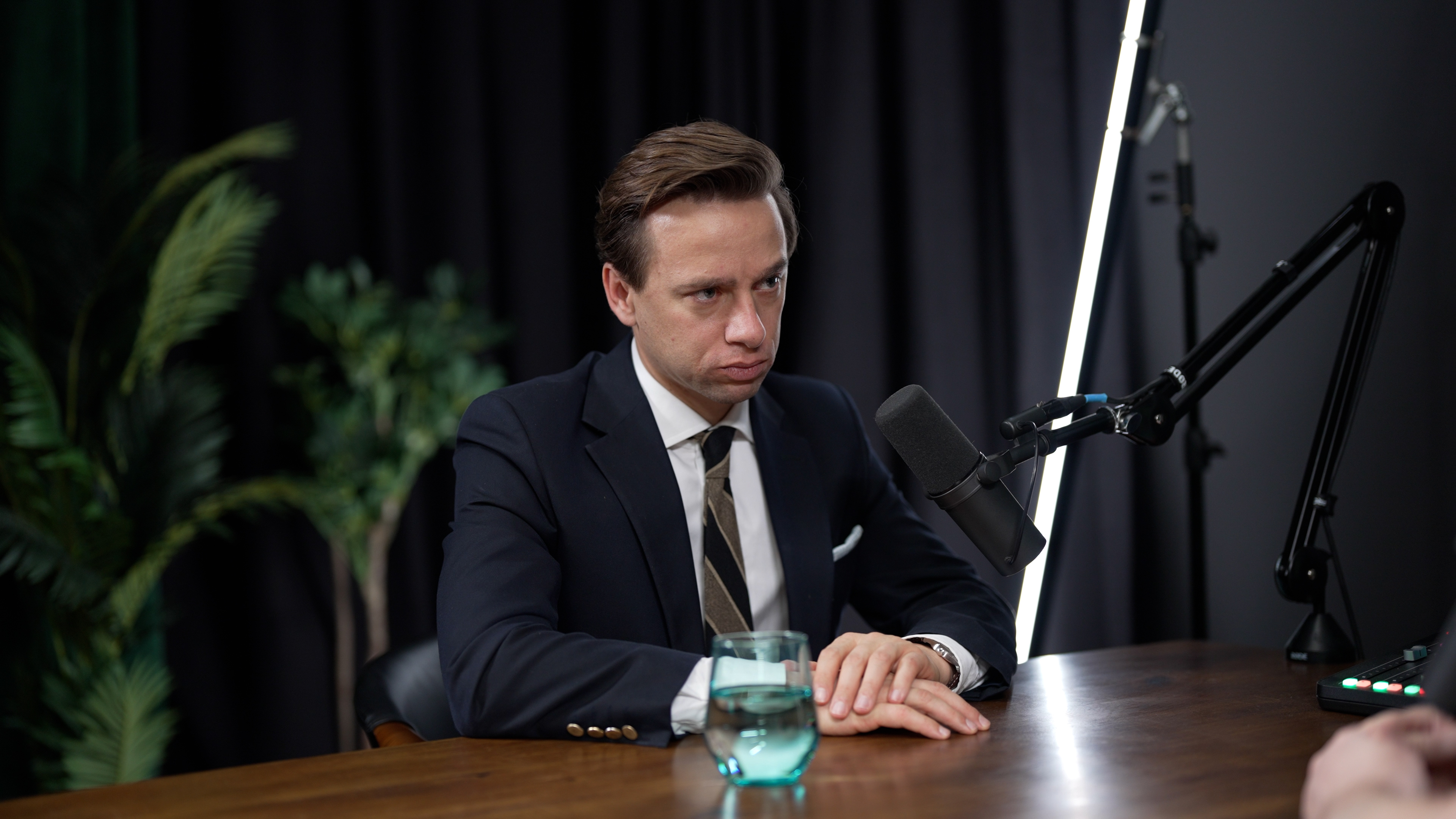

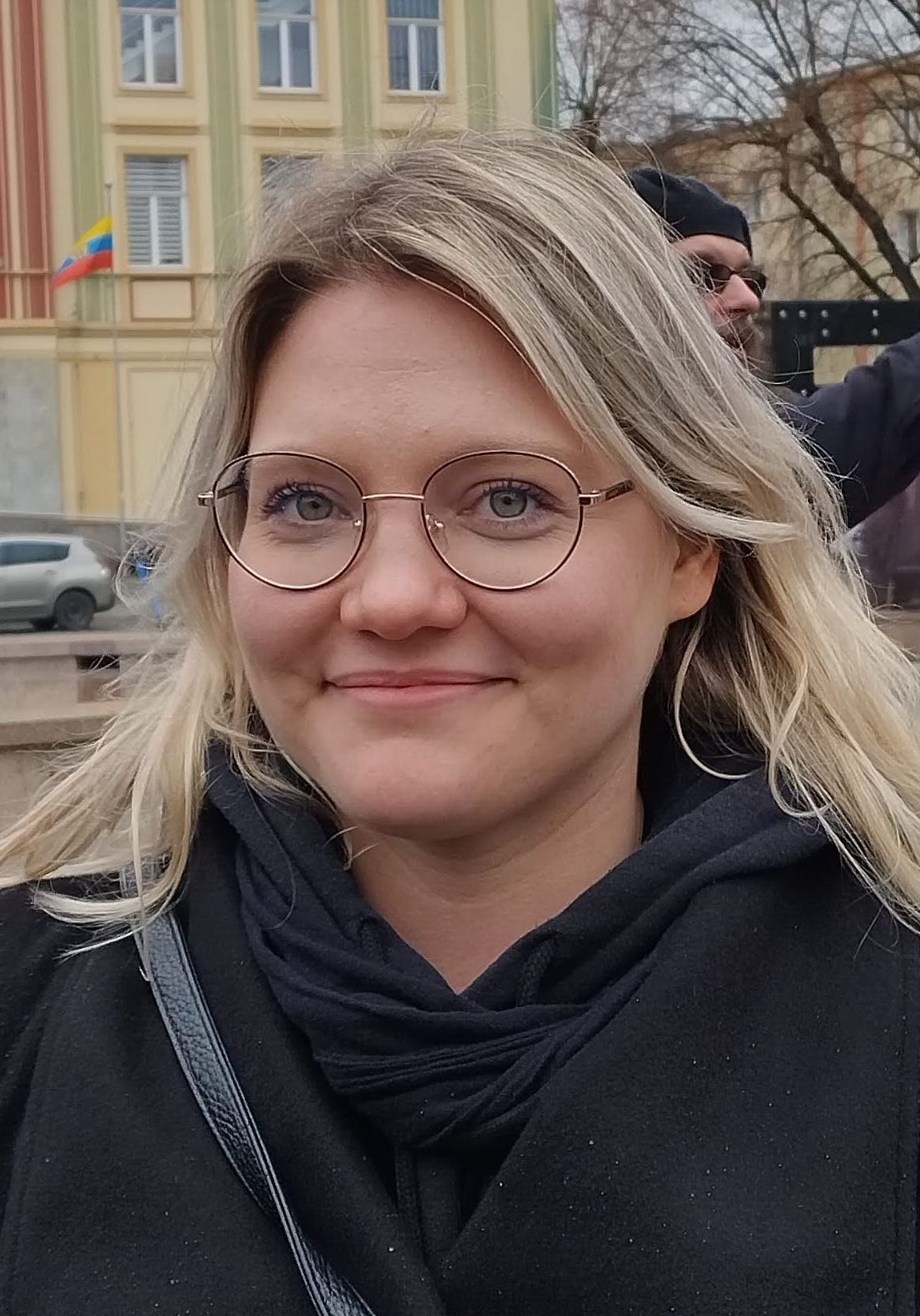

Leader	Donald Tusk	Przemysław Czarnek (Note: Jarosław Kaczyński, the leader of the Law and Justice party, named Przemysław Czarnek as prime ministerial candidate.)	Mateusz Morawiecki
Party	KO	PiS	R+
Leader since	8 March 2026 (Note: Donald Tusk previously also served as chairman of the Civic Platform between 3 July 2021–25 October 2025 before its consolidation into the Civic Coalition, and as the interim leader of the Civic Coalition party between 25 October 2025–8 March 2026.)	7 March 2026	15 April 2026
Last election	30.7%, 157 seats	35.4%, 194 seats	New (Note: As part of Law and Justice. Together, R+ deputies gained approximately 6% of the vote in the last election.)
Current seats	155	147	40
Leader	Władysław Kosiniak-Kamysz	Włodzimierz Czarzasty	Sławomir Mentzen; Krzysztof Bosak
Party	PSL	NL	Confederation (Note: Party list with the participation of NN and RN.)
Leader since	7 November 2015	9 October 2021 (Note: Włodzimierz Czarzasty previously also served as chairman of the Democratic Left Alliance between 23 January 2016–9 October 2021 before its consolidation into the New Left, as co-leader of the New Left with Robert Biedroń between 9 October 2021–14 December 2025, and as the sole leader of the New Left since 14 December 2025.)	15 October 2022; 12 May 2023
Last election	5.9%, 32 seats (Note: As part of the Third Way coalition, which won 14.4% of the vote and 65 seats in total.)	6.5%, 19 seats (Note: As part of The Left, which won 8.6% of the vote and 26 seats in total.)	6.3%, 16 seats (Note: As part of Confederation, which won 7.2% of the vote and 18 seats in total.)
Current seats	32	21	16
Leader	Vacant (Note: Since 24 October 2026, the party's chairmanship position has been vacant. Szymon Hołownia is currently serving as the chairman of the party's parliamentary club, while Ewa Schädler and Adam Rudawski sit as main vice-chairs of the party's national board.)	Adrian Zandberg; Aleksandra Owca	Grzegorz Braun
Party	PL2050	Razem	KKP
Leader since	—	27 November 2022; 3 December 2024	7 September 2019
Last election	7.2%, 33 seats	2.1%, 7 seats	0.9%, 2 seats
Current seats	15	4	3
Incumbent Government
Third Tusk cabinet
KO—PSL—PL2050—NL

Parliamentary elections will be held in Poland by 11 November 2027 at the latest to elect members of the Sejm and Senate, although they can be held sooner if a snap election is called. The last snap election was in 2007. The previous elections in 2023 saw the Law and Justice party win the most seats but fail to form a governing coalition, with a coalition government led by Civic Platform's Donald Tusk formed.

== Background ==
The election follows a declining vote share for the Law and Justice (PiS) party since the 2023 parliamentary election and the 2025 presidential election, where the party's candidate, Karol Nawrocki, scored a major upset victory against Rafał Trzaskowski of the Civic Coalition.

Following a warming of relations between PiS, led by Jarosław Kaczyński, and the far-right Confederation (KWiN), led by libertarian Sławomir Mentzen and nationalist Krzysztof Bosak, during the 2025 presidential election, PiS changed course to clash with the Confederation. The turn of relations began with PiS issuing and asking the Confederation to sign onto the "Polish declaration" (Polish: Deklaracja polska), which included points such as "housing as a right, not a commodity" that conflicted with KWiN's economically liberal policies, as well as promises to never form a coalition with the ruling Civic Coalition. On 12 September 2025, Kaczyński condemned the inclusion of Mentzen in a possible coalition, comparing the worldview promoted by the Confederation to Pinochetism.

In late 2025, Law and Justice saw reignition of its internal conflict between the moderate faction of former prime minister Mateusz Morawiecki and the radical faction of Przemysław Czarnek. Despite attempts by Morawiecki to regain his power, the party shifted further to the right, and Morawiecki's faction became increasingly marginalized. The radical faction of the party led by Czarnek (Note: In the initial announcement, aside from Czarnek, Mariusz Błaszczak, Tobiasz Bocheński, Patryk Jaki and Jacek Sasin were made the primary politicians responsible for the party's program, with all but Błaszczak being considered part of Czarnek's faction) was given initiative over the party's electoral program for the upcoming parliamentary election. On 7 March 2026, Czarnek was named as Law and Justice's candidate for the office of Prime Minister. On 15 April, Morawiecki created an association separate from PiS structures—Development Plus—aiming to coalesce people dissatisfied with existing right-wing parties. Despite affirmation of loyalty to Law and Justice, Morawiecki's allies formally split from PiS at the end of July following a rejected ultimatum from the party leadership to disband the association. During the split, Morawiecki would himself resign from presidency in the ECR Party.

Following the 2025 presidential election, the four coalition parties entered a season of internal leadership elections and reorganization, beginning with the Civic Coalition (KO) alliance uniting its three main member parties into a party of the same name at the Civic Coalition unification congress as a beginning step of their 2027 campaign, followed by upcoming leadership elections in the Polish People's Party, New Left, KO and Poland 2050 — the Poland 2050 leadership election, scheduled for January, was the most prominent, with leader Szymon Hołownia retiring amid poor performances of the party. The Polish People's Party, New Left and Civic Coalition reelected their leaders unanimously, meanwhile Poland 2050's election was controversial, polarizing and competitive. Despite Katarzyna Pełczyńska-Nałęcz narrowly emerging victorious over Paulina Hennig-Kloska, the latter and her supporters split off to form Centre.

A single electoral list of some of the coalition parties was hypothesized as a way to maximize the seat share of the incumbent government. According to media reports in late 2026, Prime Minister Tusk was attempting to create such a list, although possibly excluding the New Left. New Left chairman Czarzasty expressed his support for a joint list of the NL, Razem and New Wave, although Razem leader Adrian Zandberg rejected such a proposal.

== Electoral system ==
The Sejm is elected by party-list proportional representation with seats allocated via the d'Hondt method in 41 multi-seat constituencies, with a 5% threshold for single parties and 8% threshold for coalitions (requirements waived for national minorities).

The Senate is elected using first-past-the-post method in 100 single-member constituencies.

The date of the election will be set by the President of Poland. If the election is not called early, it has to take place within 30 days before the expiration of the current term and fall on a non-working day. The possible dates are:

- 17 October 2027 (Sunday)
- 24 October 2027 (Sunday)
- 31 October 2027 (Sunday)
- 1 November 2027 (All Saints' Day)
- 7 November 2027 (Sunday)
- 11 November 2027 (National Independence Day)

== Political parties ==
The Civic Coalition is a coalition made up of Civic Coalition (merger of Civic Platform, Modern, and Polish Initiative) and the Greens. The PO had been Poland's second largest party in the Sejm since 2015, and earned the largest number of votes in the 2024 EP election. They were the leading party of government from 2007 to 2015 and were members of the European People's Party Group (EPP Group). In October 2025, PO and its minor partners within the Civic Coalition merged into a single party of the same name, while the Greens opted to remain separate.

Law and Justice is a right-wing populist party that governed Poland following its electoral list alone gaining a majority of seats between 2015 and 2023 and was also the leading party of a minority and later coalition government from 2005 to 2007. It is a member of the European Conservatives and Reformists Group.

Development Plus is a Christian-democratic political association led by the former Prime Minister Mateusz Morawiecki. Initially created as a think-tank to represent the moderate, centre-right faction within Law and Justice known as the Scouts (Polish: Harcerze), it split from the party in July 2026. Since then, Development Plus has become an independent political association and registered its own parliamentary group, represented by Morawiecki and MPs that previously represented the Scouts.

Poland 2050 is a centre-right party led by Katarzyna Pełczyńska-Nałęcz who was elected in January 2026 to replace outgoing Szymon Hołownia, a longtime party leader who was a journalist and presenter before entering politics in 2020. It is a Christian democratic party with socially conservative, liberal-conservative and pro-European views. In the 2023 election, it ran together with the Polish People's Party in the Third Way alliance, which was dissolved in June 2025. It represents the conservative faction of the ruling coalition.

The Polish People's Party is the oldest still functioning party in Poland. Originally founded in 1895 as an agrarian peasant movement, its identity constantly shifted over time. From 1990 to late 2000s, it acted as a left-wing, agrarian socialist but socially conservative post-communist party; after forming a coalition with the Civic Platform in 2007, it shifted towards the centre and embraced economic liberalism, and it subsequently became a right-wing party in the 2010s. The shift solidified with the election of Władysław Kosiniak-Kamysz as leader in 2015. It entered the government coalition in 2023 where it acted as a right-wing force, blocking socially liberal reforms.

The New Left is composed of social liberals and social democrats. The alliance's main predecessor, Democratic Left Alliance has been in government coalitions twice, in 1993–1997 and 2001–2005. NL is a member of the Socialists and Democrats (S&D) group.

Confederation is a de jure party but de facto coalition of New Hope and the National Movement. They hold a mixture of right-libertarian, right-wing populist and nationalist views. They are members of Europe of Sovereign Nations Group (New Hope) and Patriots for Europe (National Movement).

Razem is a social democratic and progressive party, with democratic socialist and social liberal elements. It was elected as part of The Left alliance together with New Left and became a part of the ruling coalition, but it left the government and moved to opposition in October 2024 in protest of the ruling parties' austerity economic policy. The party fielded its own candidate in the 2025 Polish presidential election, and is considered likely to run independently in the next parliamentary election as well.

Confederation of the Polish Crown is a Catholic fundamentalist and monarchist political party led by Grzegorz Braun. It was part of the Confederation coalition until January 2025, when Braun was expelled from the alliance. In the 2025 Polish presidential election, Braun won 6.34% of the popular vote, gaining fourth place, even though he was only seventh in the polls. Following this unexpected success, Braun announced the creation of a "broad fire extinguisher front" to contest the next parliamentary election, which would represent "the right that is truly anti-systemic, not drifting towards the centre" and which is "truly national and Catholic". In 2025, it formed an electoral alliance to the Senate with Bezpartyjni Samorządowcy, which received 1.86% of the vote to the Sejm and 4.91% to the Senate in 2023.

Direct Democracy is a small right-wing parliamentary group based on the previous party of Paweł Kukiz and Marek Jakubiak, Kukiz'15. Its 4 MPs were elected in the 2023 election from the electoral lists of Law and Justice and then formed its own independent parliamentary group. The party ran in the 2025 presidential election, where its leader Jakubiak won 0.77% of the popular vote in the first round, and subsequently endorsed Karol Nawrocki, the candidate of PiS, for the second. The party seeks to present a right-wing alternative based on uniting patriotic movements as well as those disappointed with the agricultural policies of PiS. The circle removed Jakubiak on 27 January 2026, renaming itself to Direct Democracy, and Jarosław Sachajko becoming its new leader.

=== Parties in Parliament ===
Party/Alliance	Leader(s)	Ideology	2023 result		Current seats		Status
Party/Alliance	Leader(s)	Ideology	Sejm	Senate	Sejm	Senate	Status
Law and Justice; Prawo i Sprawiedliwość List: Law and Justice (PiS); Renewal of the Republic of Poland (ON RP)	Jarosław Kaczyński	National conservatism; Right-wing populism	United Right 194 / 460	United Right 34 / 100	147 / 460	33 / 100	Opposition
Development Plus; Rozwój Plus List: Free Republicans (WR)	Mateusz Morawiecki	Christian democracy; Conservatism	United Right 194 / 460	United Right 34 / 100	40 / 460	1 / 100	Opposition
Direct Democracy; Demokracja Bezpośrednia List: Kukiz'15 (K'15); Freedom and Prosperity (WiD)	Jarosław Sachajko	Conservatism; Right-wing populism	United Right 194 / 460	United Right 34 / 100	4 / 460	0 / 100	Opposition
Civic Coalition; Koalicja Obywatelska List: Civic Coalition (party) (KO); The Greens (Z); AGROunia (AU); Yes! For Poland (T!DP)	Donald Tusk	Liberal conservatism; Pro-Europeanism	Civic Coalition 157 / 460	Senate Pact 41 / 100	155 / 460	42 / 100	Governing coalition
Polish Coalition; Koalicja Polska List: Polish People's Party (PSL); Centre for Poland (CdP)	Władysław Kosiniak-Kamysz	Christian democracy; Conservatism	Third Way 65 / 460	Senate Pact 11 / 100	32 / 460	7 / 100	Governing coalition
Poland 2050; Polska 2050	Katarzyna Pełczyńska-Nałęcz	Christian democracy; Social conservatism	Third Way 65 / 460	Senate Pact 11 / 100	15 / 460	1 / 100	Governing coalition
Centre Union; Unia Centrum	Paulina Hennig-Kloska	Liberalism; Centrism	Third Way 65 / 460	Senate Pact 11 / 100	15 / 460	3 / 100	Governing coalition
The Left; Lewica List: New Left (NL); Polish Socialist Party (PPS); Labour Union (UP)	Włodzimierz Czarzasty	Social democracy; Social liberalism	The Left 26 / 460	Senate Pact 9 / 100	21 / 460	8 / 100	Governing coalition
Together Party; Partia Razem	Aleksandra Owca; Adrian Zandberg	Social democracy; Democratic socialism	The Left 26 / 460	Senate Pact 9 / 100	4 / 460	0 / 100	Opposition (Government support 2023–2024)
Confederation; Konfederacja List: National Movement (RN); New Hope (NN)	Sławomir Mentzen; Krzysztof Bosak	Right-wing populism; Polish nationalism	Confederation 18 / 460	Confederation 0 / 100	16 / 460	0 / 100	Opposition
The Crown; Korona	Grzegorz Braun	Enthronement; Ultranationalism	Confederation 18 / 460	Confederation 0 / 100	3 / 460	0 / 100	Opposition
New Poland; Nowa Polska	Zygmunt Frankiewicz	Conservative liberalism; Centrism	—	Part of Senate Pact 2023	0 / 460	3 / 100	—
Independents (government supporters)			0 / 460	5 / 100	5 / 460	2 / 100	Government support
Independents (government opponents)			0 / 460	5 / 100	3 / 460	2 / 100	Opposition

== Campaign ==
The upset victory of Law and Justice (PiS)-endorsed Karol Nawrocki at the country's 2025 presidential election revealed a change in the Polish political landscape. Following the presidential election, right-wing parties overtook the governing coalition in opinion polls. However, the shift favoured the far-right rather than the mainstream PiS which saw an increasingly widening polling deficit between it and the Civic Coalition (KO), despite the victory of Nawrocki. Furthermore, in July 2026, Mateusz Morawiecki's Development Plus (R+) association split off from PiS, further fragmenting the vote of the right, as the group started with approximately 7% voting intention in opinion polls.

The far-right Confederation Liberty and Independence (KWiN) and Confederation of the Polish Crown (KKP) surged in popularity after their candidates, Sławomir Mentzen and Grzegorz Braun, respectively, overperformed in the presidential election — with Mentzen earning 15% of the vote, and Braun 6%. Braun's party became a significant political factor as the most anti-establishment party, and polls in November and December showed a quarter of Poles wanted Braun to enter the next cabinet. In late 2025, PiS scored its worst polling results in years, with polls suggesting many of their voters defecting to KKP and KWiN, although especially the former — a December 2025 Onet report estimated that 64% of KKP voters had voted for PiS in the previous election, whereas only 30% of KWiN's supporters voted for PiS two years prior. As the two Confederations grew in support, a February 2026 poll showed that most voters for right-wing parties overwhelmingly supported a broad right-wing coalition including PiS, KWiN and KKP. With its newfound popularity, the KKP identified itself around the "broad fire extinguisher front", coalescing anti-establishment forces.

PiS began its post-presidential election campaign by issuing "Polish declaration" (Polish: Deklaracja polska) outlining basic stances of the party in July 2025. On 24–25 October 2025, the party held a programmatic convention in Katowice titled "Myśląc: Polska" (English: Thinking: Poland). During the convention, chairman Kaczyński commented on the situation in the country, highlighting economic matters, healthcare and security as Poland's most important issues. He condemned European integration, describing it as German imperialism and erosion of Polish statehood. The convention included 128 panels discussing a wide range of topics and conceptual ideas such as a universal basic income of 500 PLN, a voucher for home-buying families or automatic tax payment by AI.

In November 2025, Law and Justice gave initiative over the party's electoral program for the upcoming parliamentary election to Przemysław Czarnek, Mariusz Błaszczak, Tobiasz Bocheński, Patryk Jaki and Jacek Sasin. On 7 March 2026, PiS held another convention in Kraków, where Czarnek was named as the party's candidate for the office of Prime Minister, shifting the party in an ideological and right-wing direction, seeking to pursue Confederation and KKP voters in a "Czarnek effect". However, early opinion polls showed Czarnek to be a largely unpopular choice, with him seeing approval of only around a quarter of Polish society.

Nearing the halfway point of the parliament's term, the Civic Coalition (KO)'s governmental coalition partners—the Third Way alliance (PL2050, PSL) and the New Left—declined in support, with their voters defecting in large part to KO. As the topic of persecuting PiS declined in importance outside of its core electorate, KO oriented its campaign message on the rise of Grzegorz Braun's KKP and alarming about the prospect of a Polish withdrawal from the European Union. In relation to the government's laws being vetoed by president Karol Nawrocki, KO engaged on a media campaign titling the president a "vetomat" (Polish: wetomat). In April, Tusk selected ten party members to prepare the party for the upcoming parliamentary election: Aleksandra Gajewska, Monika Rosa, Małgorzata Gromadzka, Cezary Tomczyk, Paweł Bliźniuk, Maciej Wróbel, Maciej Tomczykiewicz, Arkadiusz Marchewka, Andrzej Domański and Adam Szłapka.

Following the 2025 presidential election, the ruling coalition was involved in two major financial or corruption affairs. In August 2025, the affair regarding the misappropriation of KPO funds known as the "KPO affair", involving the misappropriation of a section of European Union COVID-19 relief funds worth 1,2 billion PLN designated for investment into the hospitality industry. A portion of the funds were misappropriated to purchase personal luxuries or embezzled by politicians—according to the Supreme Audit Office, around 90% of funds were misappropriated for liquidity rather than investment. A second affair occurred in June 2026, involving the corruption in the Southern Warsaw Hospital, where Civic Coalition politicians and their families were allowed an informal "VIP" fast-track for medical attention. The affair centered on doctor Dawid Kacprzyk who earned 1,6 million PLN coordinating the operation. Mayor of Warsaw and former presidential candidate Rafał Trzaskowski was accused of covering up the incident. Expert analysis speculated that the latter affair could lead to a slight decline of KO and rise of support for anti-establishment parties such as KWiN, KKP or Razem, although due to the dominance of KO among liberal voters, its decline would not be significant.

As part of the election campaign, opposition parties supported referendums to recall city presidents from the governing coalition. The referendums successfully recalled the city presidents of Zabrze (2025), Kraków (2026) and Częstochowa (2026), as well as the city councils of Częstochowa (2026).

== Opinion polls ==
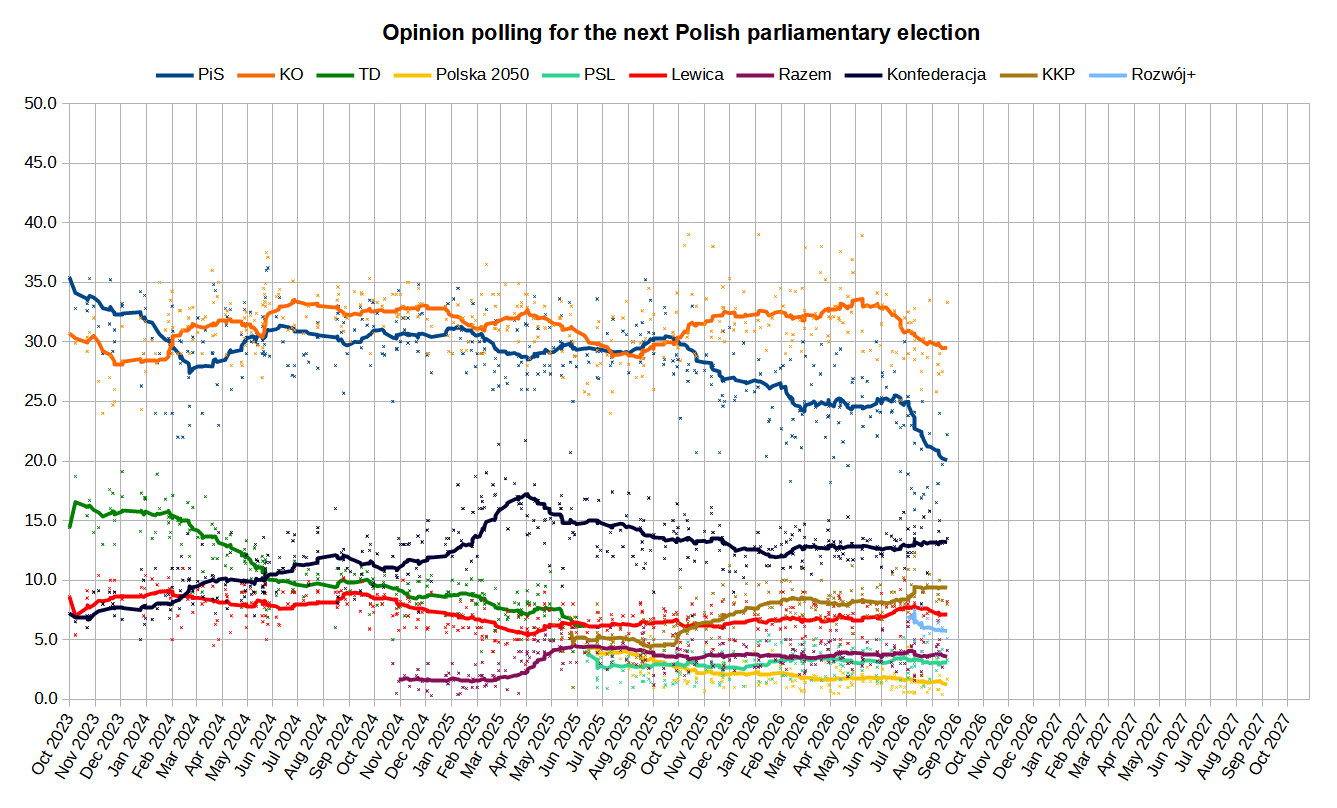
