= 2016 Democratic Left Alliance leadership election =

Polish election

- 16 January 2016 (first round); 23 January 2016 (second round)
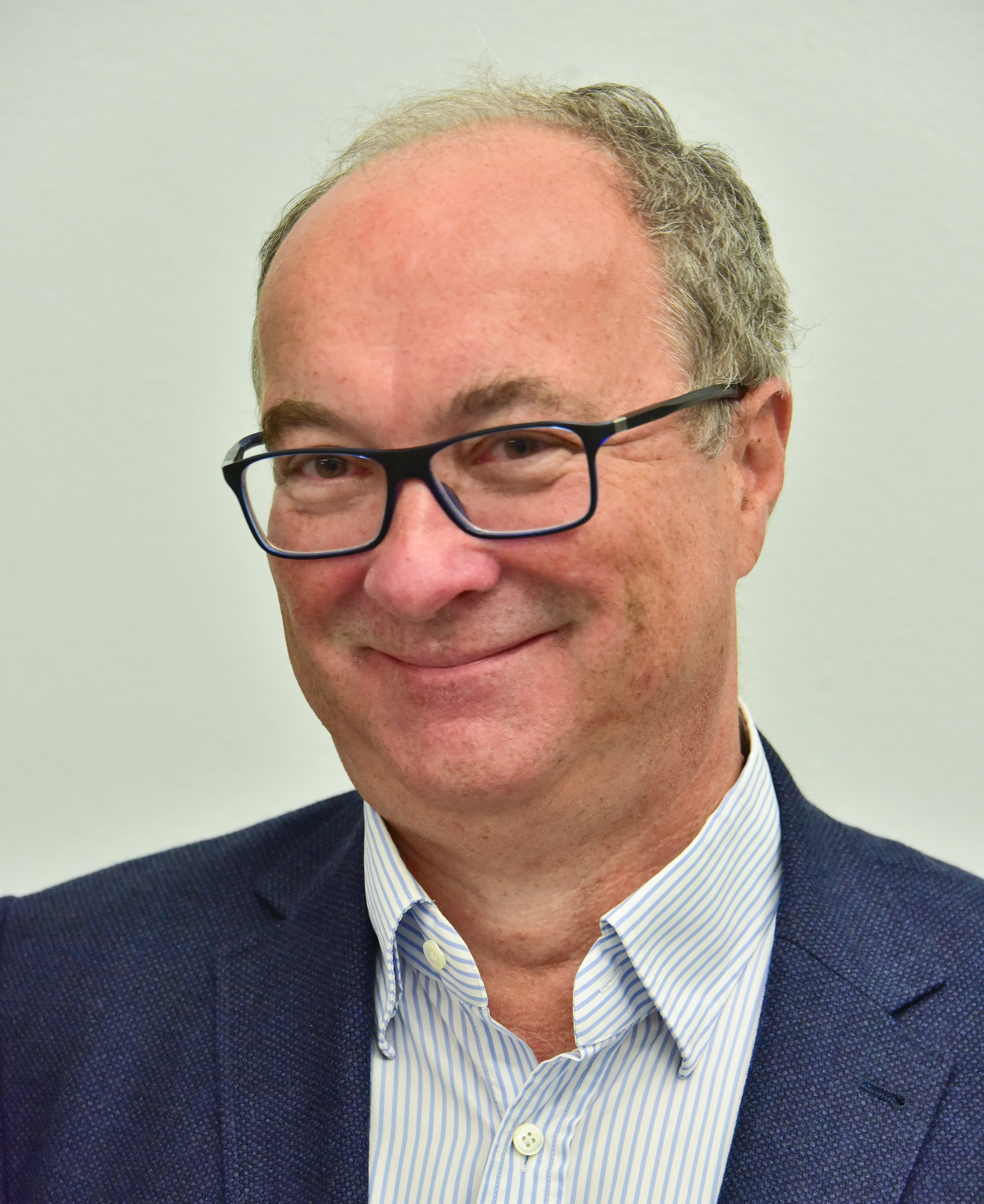

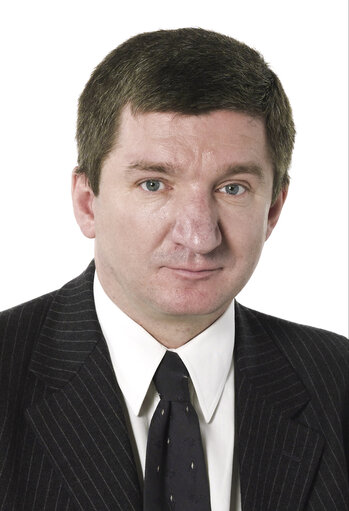
Candidate	Włodzimierz Czarzasty	Jerzy Wenderlich
Popular vote	428	305
Percentage	58.39%	41.61%
Leader before election
Leszek Miller
Elected Leader
Włodzimierz Czarzasty

The 2016 Democratic Left Alliance leadership election was held in January 2016 to elect the leader of the Democratic Left Alliance. Włodzimierz Czarzasty was elected as the new leader of the party, defeating Jerzy Wenderlich by a margin of 17%. Following the election, the party began a process of transformation into the New Left party together with Robert Biedroń's Spring.

== Procedure ==
The leadership election took place on 16 January (10:00 to 15:00 CET) with a runoff on 23 January 2016. In the first round, all party members were eligible to vote, and turnout reached almost 63%. The second round was held at the Party Congress, where 733 cast their vote.

== Background ==
The election took place after the poor showing of the party in the 2015 presidential election, where its candidate, Magdalena Ogórek, came fifth with 2.38% of the vote, and the defeat of the party with its electoral alliance in the 2015 parliamentary election, where the alliance fell under the 8% threshold, losing all of its seats. The incumbent leader, Leszek Miller, did not stand for re-election following the defeat. The defeat also caused turmoil within the party, with a group in the party (politicians such as Krzysztof Gawkowski, Dariusz Joński, Marek Balt, Tomasz Trela) calling for Miller's resignation from politics.

== Candidates ==
=== Candidates in the second round ===
Candidate	Born	Political office
Włodzimierz Czarzasty	3 May 1960; Warsaw, Poland	Member of the National Broadcasting Council (1999–2005)
Jerzy Wenderlich	22 April 1954; Toruń, Poland	Deputy Marshal of the Sejm (2010–2015); Member of the Sejm (1993–2015)

== Results ==
=== Party leader ===
Candidate	1st round		2nd round	
Candidate	Vote	%	Vote	%
Włodzimierz Czarzasty ✓	5,541	37.97	428	58.39
Jerzy Wenderlich	3,619	24.80	305	41.61
Krzysztof Gawkowski	3,294	22.57	Eliminated	
Zbyszek Zaborowski	837	5.74	Eliminated	
Joanna Senyszyn	417	2.86	Eliminated	
Michał Huzarski	385	2.64	Eliminated	
Tomasz Nesterowicz	253	1.73	Eliminated	
Dariusz Szczotkowski	134	0.92	Eliminated	
Adam Kępiński	77	0.53	Eliminated	
Piotr Rączkowski	35	0.24	Eliminated	
Total	14,592	100.00	733	100.00
Source: Dziennik Gazeta Prawna, Polish Press Agency

== Aftermath ==
Following the election, the party began a process of transformation into the broader Left alliance and later the New Left party together with the Spring party of Robert Biedroń. In 2019, the SLD returned to the Sejm, earning 4.7% of the vote and 23 seats as part of the Left alliance, which got 12.6% of the vote and 49 seats.
