= Aleksandra Uznańska-Wiśniewska =

Polish politician and activist

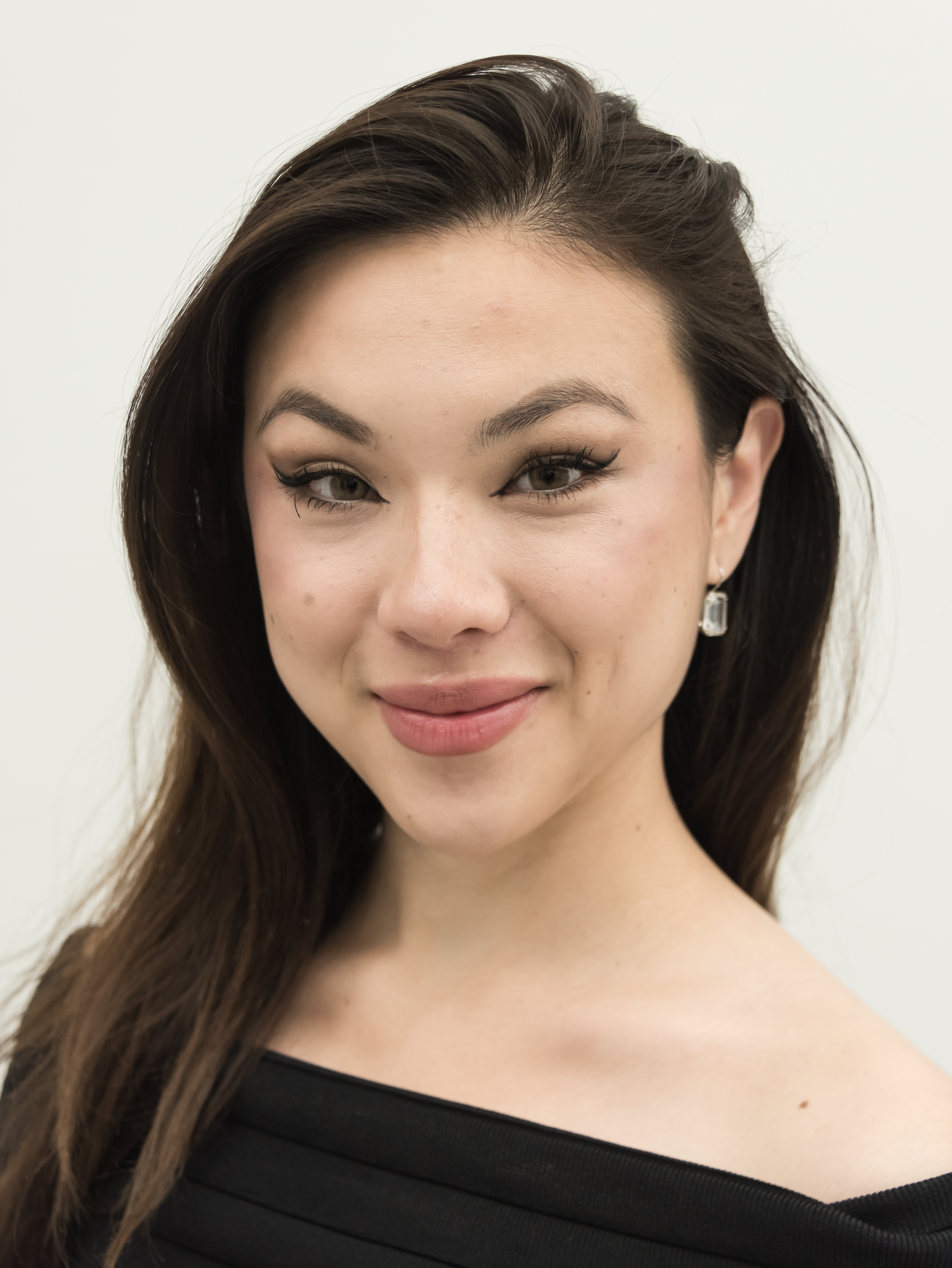
- Uznańska-Wiśniewska in 2023

Member of the Sejm of Poland
- Incumbent
- Assumed office 13 November 2023
- Constituency: No. 9

Personal details
- Born: Aleksandra Karolina Wiśniewska; 27 May 1994 (age 32) Łódź, Poland
- Citizenship: Poland; Thailand
- Party: Civic Coalition (party; since 2025)
- Other political affiliations: Civic Platform (2024–2025); Civic Coalition (political alliance; 2023–2024); Independent (2023–2024)
- Spouse: Sławosz Uznański (m. 2025)
- Children: 1
- Education: London School of Economics; University of Oxford
- Occupation: Politician, political scientist, humanitarian

Aleksandra Karolina Uznańska-Wiśniewska (Note: Polish pronunciation: [a.lɛkˈsan.dra ka.rɔˈli.na uzˈnaɲ.ska viɕˈɲɛf.ska]) (born 27 May 1994) is a Polish politician, political scientist, humanitarian, and social activist. Since 2023, she has been a member of the Sejm of Poland. Uznańska-Wiśniewska is a member of the Civic Coalition party.

== Early life and education ==
Aleksandra Uznańska-Wiśniewska was born on 27 May 1994 in Łódź, Poland. Her father, Radosław Wiśniewski, is a businessperson, and founder and chairperson of the company Redan. He is Polish. Her mother, Piengjai Wiśniewska, is of Chinese and Thai descent, and comes from Bangkok, Thailand. Aleksandra also has a brother.

Uznańska-Wiśniewska attended the Emilia Sczaniecka 4th High School in Łódź. At the age of 17, she received the scholarship of the United World Colleges, moving to Italy, where she finished her education. Uznańska-Wiśniewska graduated from the London School of Economics with bachelor's degrees in political science and philosophy, and from the Blavatnik School of Government of the University of Oxford, with a master's degree in public policy. While studying at the London School of Economics, she was a chairperson of the Polish Business Society, and an organiser of the Polish Economic Forum. In 2018, the business magazine Forbes placed her on the Poland-based edition its annual list "30 Under 30", which recognizes thirty notable people under the age of 30 in various industries.

== Humanitarian work ==
In December 2015, during the European migrant crisis, Uznańska-Wiśniewska volunteered at the refugee camp on Lesbos island in Greece. She also conducted the field research of the human rights violations in the refugee camps in Calais and Dunkirk, located in France. Later, Uznańska-Wiśniewska also worked for the United Nations Development Programme agency on developing strategy for distribution of the humanitarian aid in Jordan and Turkey, in response to the Syrian civil war.

In 2019, Uznańska-Wiśniewska became a coordinator of the Polish Humanitarian Action mission to Yemen led by Paula Gierak. The mission was aimed at giving humanitarian aid in the cholera epidemic during the Yemeni civil war. Following the outbreak of the COVID-19 pandemic, she continued to work for the mission, helping to rebuild destroyed clinics, and to re-establish the national healthcare system, which were affected by the conflict.

In 2022 and 2023, following the Russian invasion of Ukraine, Uznańska-Wiśniewska worked in the county for the Children's Aid Foundation helping to evacuate orphanages. She later became the head of an Intersos mission in Ukraine. In 2025, Uznańska-Wiśniewska became a member of the council of the Jan Olszewski Aid to Poles in the East Foundation.

== Political career ==
In 2019, Uznańska-Wiśniewska worked for the campaign team of Janina Ochojska, who was a candidate for a member of the European Parliament in the Polish election. In 2023, she became the plenipotentiary for citizen participation of the mayor of Łódź, Hanna Zdanowska. The same year, Uznańska-Wiśniewska also became the face of the campaign "Will You Dare?" (Polish: Odważysz się?), aimed at promoting participation in the election among young people.

In 2023, Uznańska-Wiśniewska was elected as a member of the Sejm of Poland in the parliamentary election, receiving 25,436 votes (5.57%). She was a nonpartisan candidate of the Civic Coalition political alliance, in the constituency no. 9, which consists of the city of Łódź, and counties of Brzeziny and Łódź East. Uznańska-Wiśniewska became the secretary of the Sejm, and a member of the Communications with Poles Abroad Committee, the Foreign Affairs Committee, and the National Defense Committee. Later, in 2024, she became member of the Civic Platform party, which following a merger, was transformed into the Civic Coalition in 2025.

== Personal life ==
In 2025, Uznańska-Wiśniewska married Sławosz Uznański-Wiśniewski, an engineer and astronaut who became the second Polish national to go to space. Together they have a son, born in 2026. She holds citizenship of Poland and Thailand, and declares herself as both Polish and Thai.

== Electoral history ==
Electoral history of Agnieszka Kłopotek
Year	Office		Party	Constituency	Votes			Result	Ref.
Year	Office		Party	Constituency	Total	%	P.	Result	Ref.
2023	Sejm of Poland	10th	Civic Coalition	No. 9	25,436	5.57	6th	Won	

== Awards and decorations ==
- Karski2020 Award by the Jan Karski Educational Fundation (2020)
- Green Hero Award by BNP Paribas Bank Polska (2022)
- Medal for the 600th anniversary of Łódź (2023)
