= 2025 New Left leadership election =

Polish election

- 14 December 2025
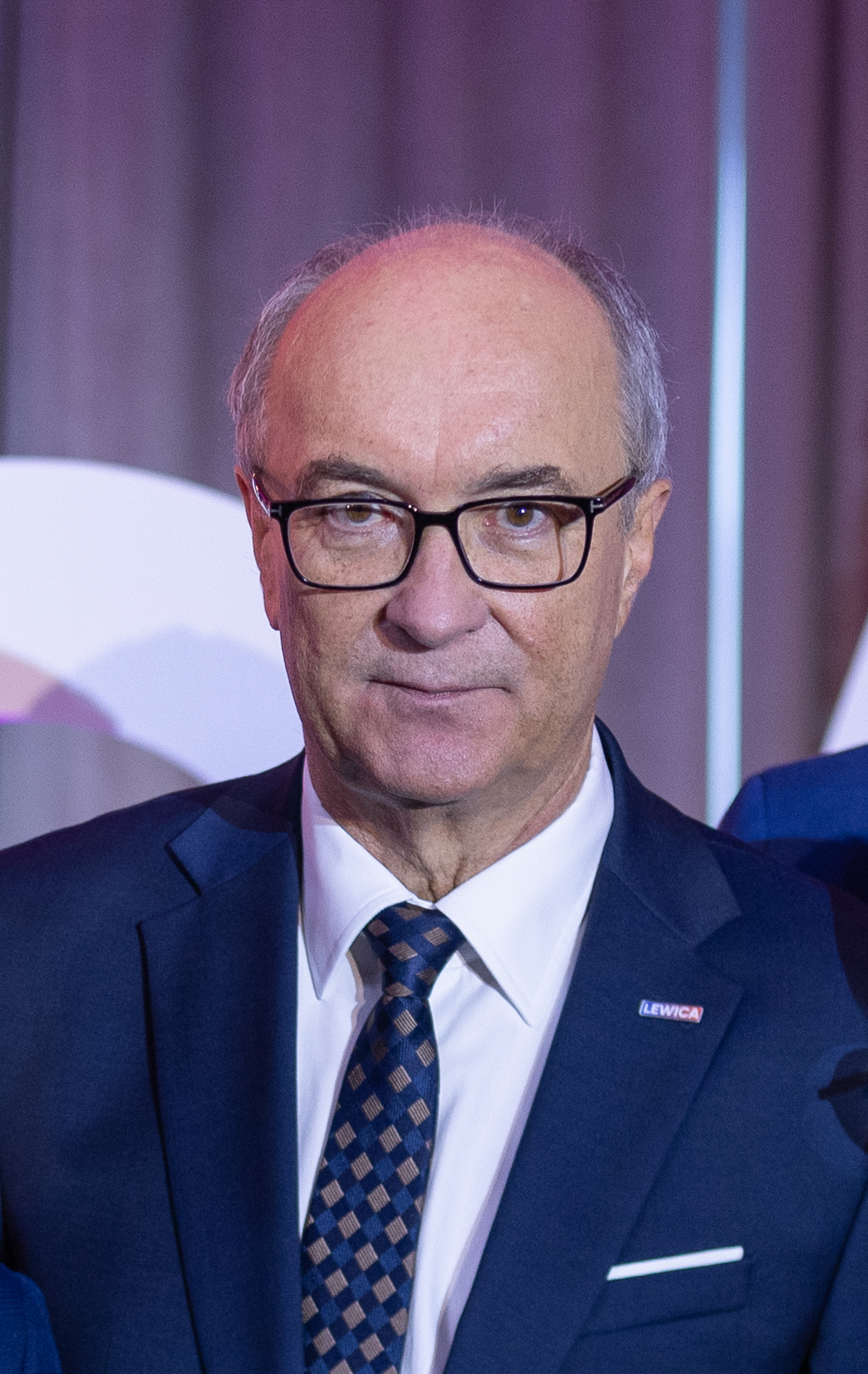
Candidate	Włodzimierz Czarzasty
Leader before election
Włodzimierz Czarzasty
Robert Biedroń
Elected Leader
Włodzimierz Czarzasty (as sole leader)

The 2025 New Left leadership election was held on 14 December 2025 at the 2025 New Left Congress in Warsaw to elect the leader of the party. Incumbent leader Włodzimierz Czarzasty was re-elected to the position unopposed, as all other candidates withdrew following the announcement of his re-election bid for the position on 11 December.

== Background ==
The election took place following an underperformance of the party's presidential candidate, Magdalena Biejat, in the 2025 Polish presidential election, where she fell behind left-wing challenger Adrian Zandberg. The underperformance led to calls for a change in leadership to empower the younger generation in the party. Despite this, Czarzasty's position remained strong, especially after succeeding Szymon Hołownia as Marshal of the Sejm.

== Procedure ==
The term of the party leadership lasts 4 years. The leadership election took place on 14 December 2025 at the 2025 New Left Congress in Warsaw.

The leadership election succeeded an Extraordinary Congress of the New Left held on 24 May, where the party agreed to abolish its factional system (the Democratic Left Alliance faction led by Czarzasty and Spring faction led by Robert Biedroń) and co-leadership structure (with Czarzasty and Biedroń as co-leaders) at the next Congress. Therefore, in this election, the New Left elected a singular leader, rather than two co-leaders, as it had in the previous one.

== Campaign ==
=== Włodzimierz Czarzasty ===
Włodzimierz Czarzasty declared his candidacy on 11 December 2025, asking all other candidates to endorse his candidacy. Czarzasty began his political career in the Polish United Workers' Party, which later transformed into the Democratic Left Alliance. He became its leader in 2016 and led the party to unify with Robert Biedroń's Spring, first in the form of an electoral alliance — The Left — and then into a single party, the New Left. He became the Marshal of the Sejm in 2025.

Czarzasty's entry shortly before the election led to the withdrawal of all other candidates. He was elected with no opposition three days later at the party's congress.

=== Other candidates ===
Agnieszka Dziemianowicz-Bąk, Krzysztof Gawkowski and Tomasz Trela all announced their candidacies before the entry of Czarzasty. Marcin Kulasek was also considered a possible candidate. Dziemianowicz-Bąk and Gawkowski were considered the most serious candidates, with Dziemianowicz-Bąk seen as the more left-wing choice and Gawkowski seen as more conciliatory towards Prime Minister Donald Tusk. In the end, all of the candidates ended up withdrawing following Czarzasty's declaration.

== Candidates ==
Candidate	Born	Political office	Announced
Włodzimierz Czarzasty	3 May 1960; Warsaw, Poland	Leader of the New Left (Note: Czarzasty also served as leader of the Democratic Left Alliance between 2016–2021.) (2021–present); Marshal of the Sejm (Note: Czarzasty also served as Deputy Marshal of the Sejm between 2023–2025.) (2025–present); Member of the Sejm (2019–present)	11 December 2025

=== Withdrawn candidates ===
Candidate	Born	Political office	Announced	Withdrew
Agnieszka Dziemianowicz-Bąk	20 January 1984; Wrocław, Poland	Minister of Family, Labour and Social Policy (2023–present); Member of the Sejm (2019–present)	1 May 2025	11 December 2025 (Note: Agnieszka Dziemianowicz-Bąk, Krzysztof Gawkowski and Tomasz Trela withdrew after the entry of Włodzimierz Czarzasty into the election.)
Krzysztof Gawkowski	11 April 1980; Warsaw, Poland	Deputy Prime Minister of Poland (2023–present); Minister of Digital Affairs (2023–present); Member of the Sejm (2019–present)		11 December 2025
Tomasz Trela	30 December 1979; Łódź, Poland	Member of the Sejm (2019–present)		11 December 2025

== Results ==
=== Party leader ===
Candidate	Vote	%
Włodzimierz Czarzasty ✓	?	?
Source: Polish Press Agency
