= Sejm Constituency no. 9 =

Polish parliamentary constituency

Sejm Constituency no. 9 Łódź
- Okręg wyborczy nr 1 Łódź
- Constituency for the Sejm
- Location within Poland.
- Counties: Brzeziny, Łódź, Łódź East
- Voivodeship: Łódź
- Population: 763,051 (June 2023)
- Electorate: 581,567 (2023)
- Area: 1,151.61 km^{2} (444.64 sq mi)

Current constituency
- Created: 2001
- Members: 10

Sejm Constituency no. 9 (Polish: Okręg wyborczy nr 9 do Sejmu) is a Polish constituency represented in the Sejm, lower house of Polish parliament, by ten members. It is located in the Łódź Voivodeship and comprises the city of Łódź, Brzeziny and Łódź East counties.

Corresponding constituencies for the Senate are numbered 23 and 24.

== List of members ==
Members of the 10th Sejm (2023–2027)
Member	Party
Paweł Bliźniuk	Civic Platform (KO)
Dariusz Joński	Polish Initiative (KO)
Marcin Józefaciuk	Independent politician (KO)
Małgorzata Niemczyk	Civic Platform (KO)
Aleksandra Uznańska-Wiśniewska	Independent politician (KO)
Ewa Szymanowska	Poland 2050 (PL2050)
Tomasz Trela	New Left (L)
Zbigniew Rau	Law and Justice (PiS)
Waldemar Buda	Law and Justice (PiS)
Agnieszka Wojciechowska van Heukelom	Independent politician (PiS)

== Elections ==
=== 2023 ===
2023 parliamentary election: Łódź
Party	Votes	%	Seats
Civic Coalition	187,527	41.07	5
Law and Justice	122,433	26.82	3
New Left	55,770	12.22	1
Third Way	54,283	11.89	1
Confederation	25,428	5.57	–
Nonpartisan Local Government Activists	5,624	1.23	–
There is One Poland	5,487	1.20	–
Total	456,552	100.00	10
Valid votes	456,552	99.09	
Invalid/blank votes	4,184	0.91	
Total votes	460,736	100.00	
Registered voters/turnout	581,567	79.22	
Source: National Electoral Commission
