= 2021 New Left leadership elections =

Polish election

- 9 October 2021
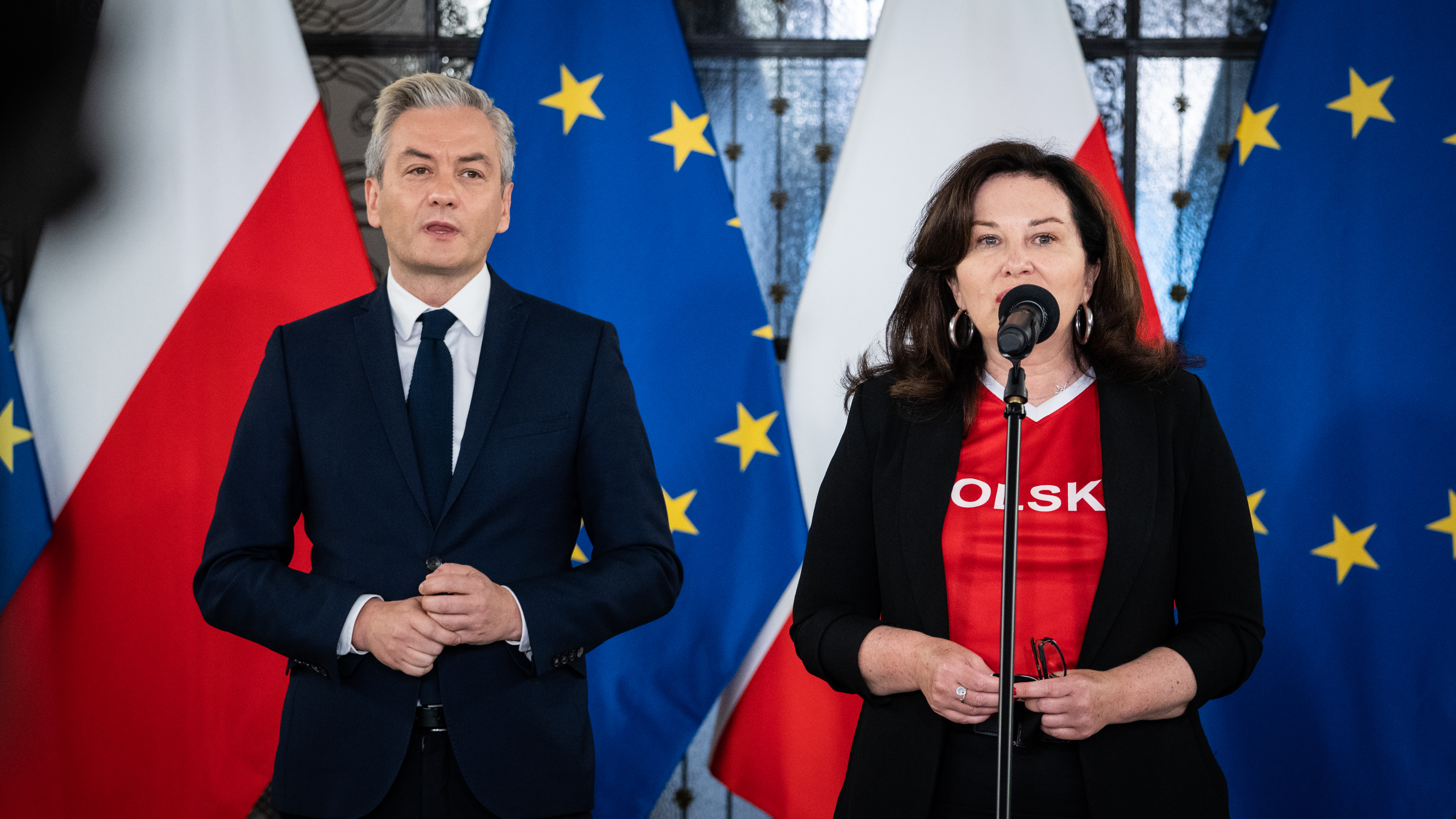

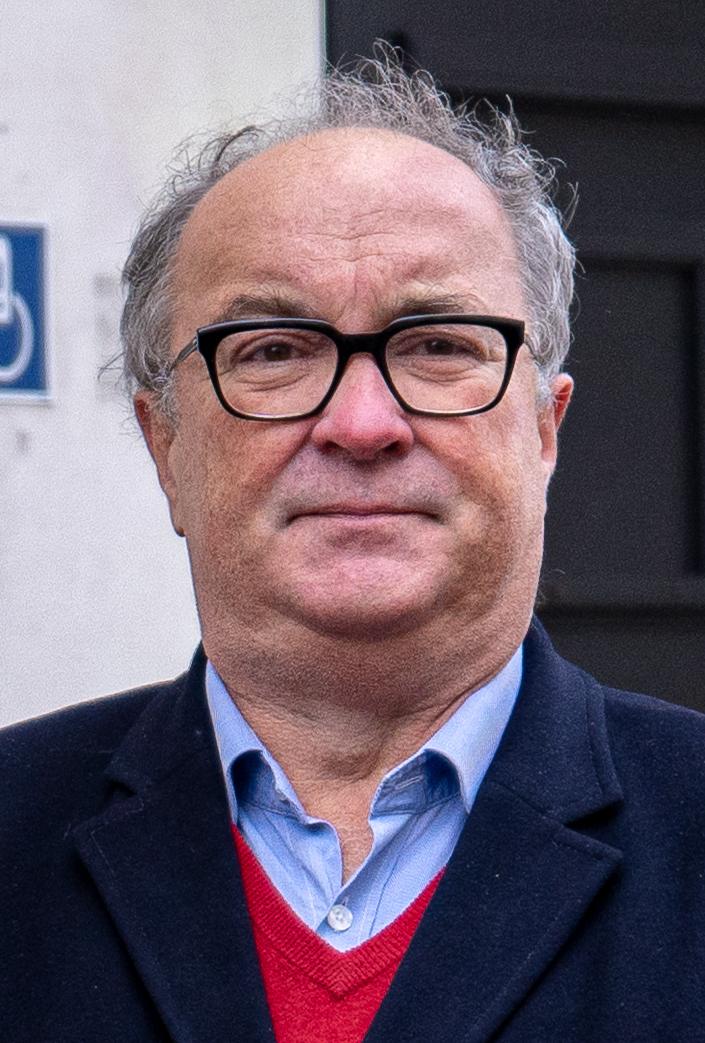

Candidate	Robert Biedroń	Włodzimierz Czarzasty	Piotr Rączkowski
Popular vote	936 (W)	887 (SLD)	152 (SLD)
Percentage	100.00%	85.37%	14.63%
Co-leaders before election
Włodzimierz Czarzasty (as SLD leader)
Robert Biedroń (as Spring leader)
Elected Co-leaders
Włodzimierz Czarzasty
Robert Biedroń

The 2021 New Left leadership elections were held on 9 October 2021 at the New Left Unification Congress in Warsaw to elect the leader of the party. Robert Biedroń and Włodzimierz Czarzasty were elected as party co-leaders and served their terms for the next 4 years.

== Background ==
The elections took place during the New Left's Unification Congress. The two parties formally coordinated in The Left alliance since 2019, and the Unification Congress completed the process of unification between the two parties.

== Procedure ==
The term of the party leadership lasts 4 years. The leadership elections took place on 9 October 2021 at the 2025 New Left Unification Congress in Warsaw. Delegates for the party's two internal factions — the Democratic Left Alliance (SLD) and Spring — elected leaders for their faction, which would also serve as the party's co-leaders. These were the only leadership elections in the New Left where the faction system was used — for the next election, the faction system was abolished alongside the co-leadership system, with Włodzimierz Czarzasty becoming the party's sole leader.

== Elections ==
Both factions re-elected their incumbent leaders, Robert Biedroń and Włodzimierz Czarzasty. However, Czarzasty faced a challenge from Piotr Rączkowski, a minor SLD politician, who entered the race to protest the "undemocratic" way in which the New Left party was founded. Despite remaining on the ballot, Rączkowski was removed from the conference by security with the pretext that he was not a delegate to the Congress, despite being a member of the SLD.

== Results ==
=== Party co-leaders ===
Democratic Left Alliance faction			Spring faction		
Candidate	Vote	%	Candidate	Vote	%
Włodzimierz Czarzasty ✓	887	85.37	Robert Biedroń ✓	936	100.00
Piotr Rączkowski	152	14.63			
Total	1,039	100.00		936	100.00
Source: New Left
