= Civic Coalition unification congress =

2025 meeting of Polish political parties

A unification congress between three parties of the Civic Coalition alliance, the Civic Platform, Modern and Polish Initiative was held on 25–26 October 2025 in Warsaw. The congress united the three parties into the Civic Coalition party based on the Civic Platform.

== Background ==
The Civic Coalition (KO) alliance was founded on 7 March 2018, coalescing the liberal-conservative Civic Platform (PO), the neoliberal Modern (.N), and the social-liberal Polish Initiative (iPL) political parties for the 2018 Polish local elections. Later, The Greens and AGROunia would also join the alliance. The alliance would be in the opposition after the 2019 parliamentary election, but enter a government with the New Left and Third Way (later Polish People's Party and Poland 2050 independently) following a 2023 parliamentary election victory.

== Organization ==
A two-hour organizational meeting of the PO leadership, attended also by .N leader Adam Szłapka and iPL leader Barbara Nowacka was held on 16 October. According to the PO spokesman, Jan Grabiec, the two leaders feuded with PO over regional representation. The unification congress united the three main parties of the KO coalition, PO, .N and iPL, into a singular party. It was planned to occur shortly after the formal dissolution of .N and iPL, with a new party, also taking in the members of the former two parties, being founded on the basis of the Civic Platform. However, iPL only dissolved on 15 November. After the unification, the new party scheduled new elections for regional leadership, culminating in an 8 March 2026 election for national party leader. Representatives from the former .N and iPL were also set to become vice-chairmen of the new party. The Greens were not invited to participate in the new party, though they expressed unwillingness to join regardless.

Modern and iPL formally dissolved 24 October and 15 November, respectively.

== Congress ==
The Civic Coalition unification congress took place on 25–26 October 2025 in Warsaw, coinciding with a political convention of the rival Law and Justice. During the congress, it was decided to form a new Civic Coalition party formally distinct from the Civic Coalition alliance. Party leader Donald Tusk justified the decision stating that "we are called the Civic Coalition, because as KO we won the last election and we will win the next."

== Leadership election ==
2026 Civic Coalition leadership election
- 8 March 2026
- Registered: ~21,000
- Turnout: ~17,000 (78%)
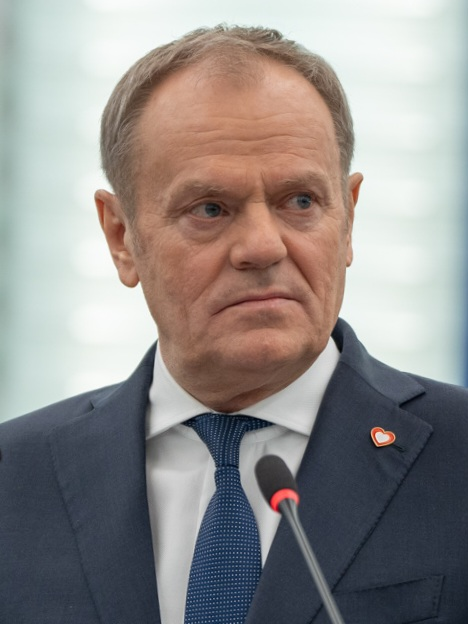
| Candidate | Donald Tusk |
| Popular vote | 16,316 |
| Percentage | 97.73% |
Leader before election
Donald Tusk (interim)
Elected Leader
Donald Tusk

A leadership election was held on 8 March 2026 to elect the new leader of the Coalition. As the registration deadline passed on 17 January, and only Donald Tusk registered to run in the election, he was elected with no opposition, winning with 98% votes for him and 2% against.

=== Results ===
| Candidate | Vote | % |
|---|---|---|
| Donald Tusk ✓ | 16,316 | 97.73 |
| Against | 379 | 2.27 |
| Total | 16,695 | 100.00 |
Source: Telewizja Polska

=== Deputy leaders ===
On 11 April 2026, the party's National Council selected 15 deputy leaders: Bartosz Arłukowicz, Borys Budka, Andrzej Domański, Rafał Grupiński, Małgorzata Kidawa-Błońska, Ewa Kopacz, Izabela Leszczyna, Dorota Niedziela, Barbara Nowacka, Marzena Okła-Drewnowicz, Tomasz Siemoniak, Radosław Sikorski, Adam Szłapka, Cezary Tomczyk and Rafał Trzaskowski. Of the 15, only 2 were not members of the Civic Platform prior to the unification of the parties — Nowacka and Szłapka. Besides 10 re-elected deputy leaders, 5 new ones were chosen: Domański, Grupiński, Nowacka, Sikorski and Szłapka.
