= Paweł Bliźniuk =

Polish politician (born 1986)

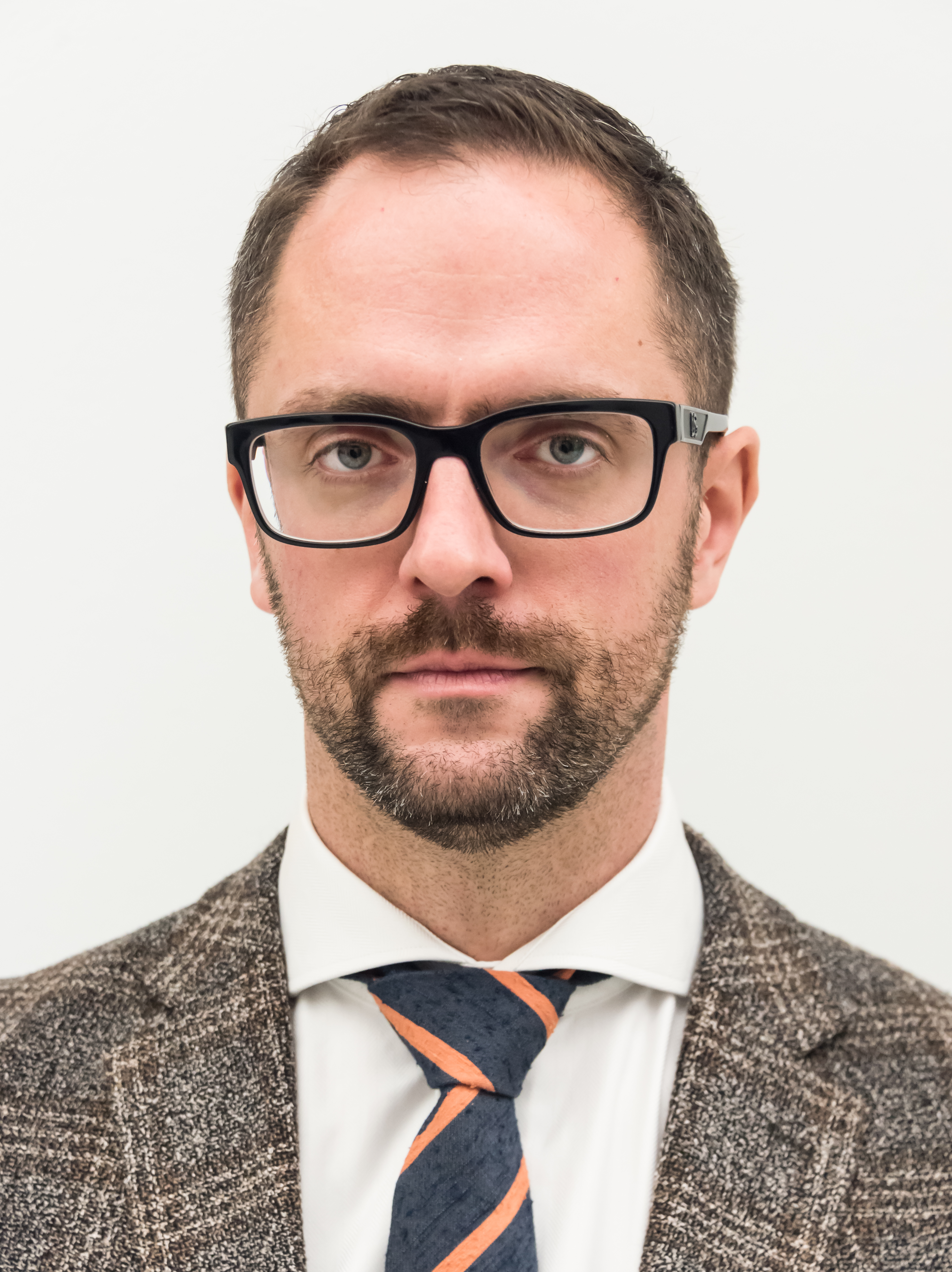
- Bliźniuk in 2023

Member of the Sejm
- Incumbent
- Assumed office 13 November 2023
- Constituency: Łódź

Personal details
- Born: 11 October 1986 (age 39)
- Party: Civic Coalition (since 2025)
- Other political affiliations: Civic Platform (until 2025)

Paweł Bliźniuk (born 11 October 1986) is a Polish politician serving as a member of the Sejm since 2023. From 2018 to 2023, he was a member of the Łódź Voivodeship Sejmik. From 2010 to 2018, he was a member of the Łódź City Council.
