= Dariusz Joński =

Polish politician (born 1979)

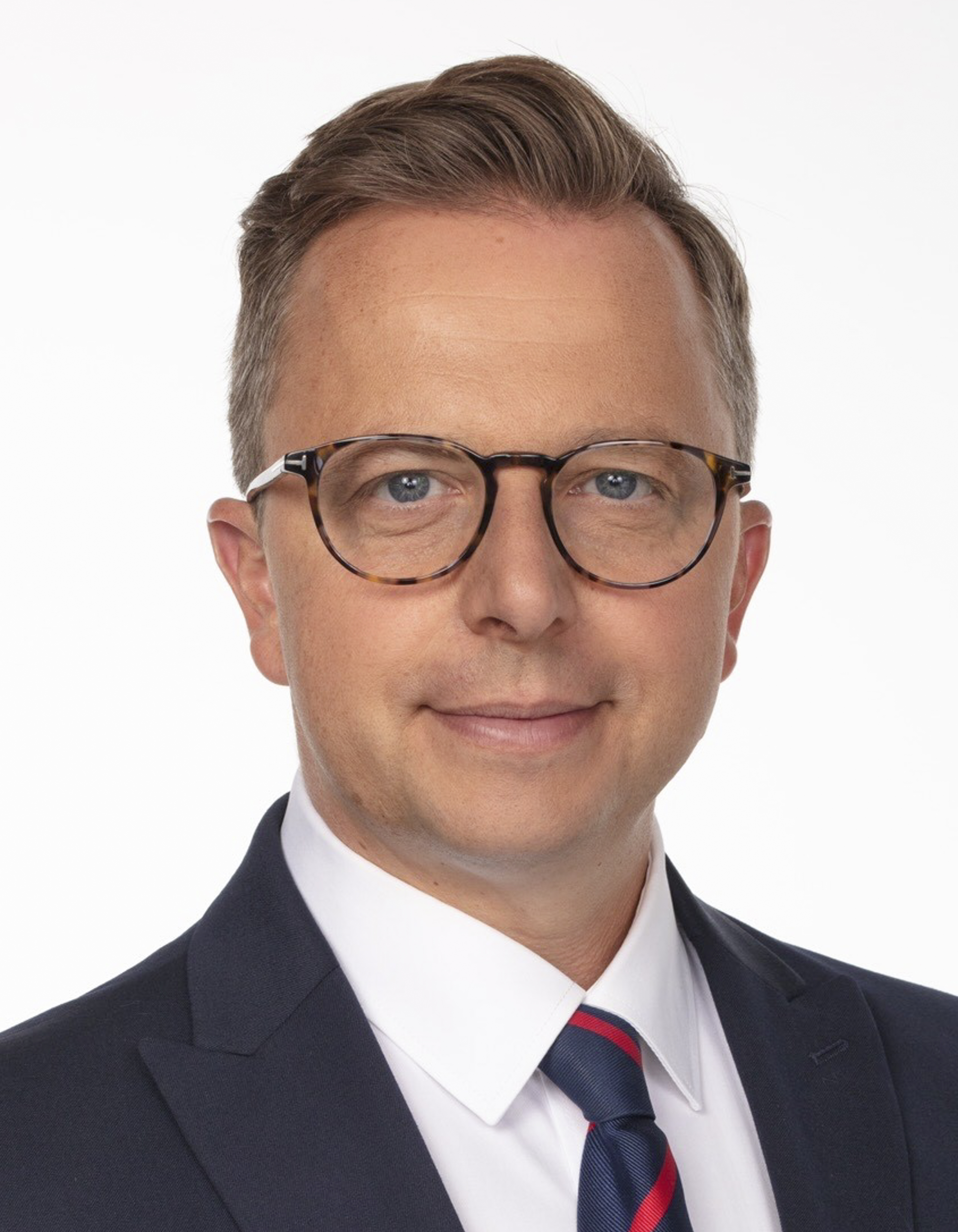
- Joński in 2024

Member of the European Parliament for Poland
- Incumbent
- Assumed office 16 July 2024
- Constituency: 6 – Łódź

Member of the Sejm
- In office 12 November 2019 – 10 June 2024
- Constituency: 9 – Łódź
- In office 25 November 2011 – 31 May 2015
- Constituency: 9 – Łódź

Personal details
- Born: 12 January 1979 (age 47) Łódź, Łódź Voivodeship, Polish People’s Republic
- Party: Democratic Left Alliance (2000–2017); Polish Initiative (from 2019)

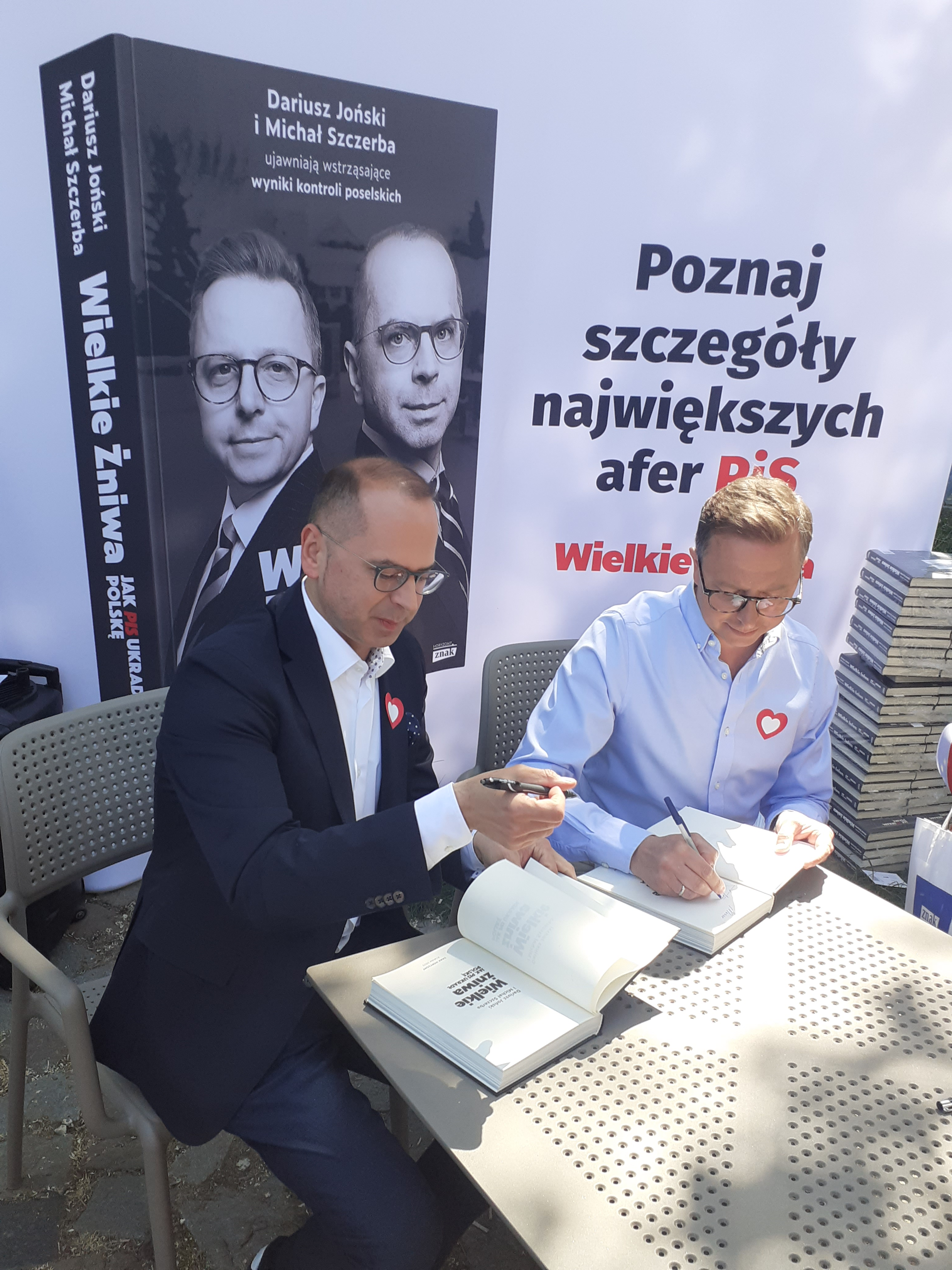
Dariusz Joński and Michał Szczerba promoting their book Wielkie żniwa. Jak PiS ukradł Polskę during the 4 June March in Warsaw

Dariusz Joński (born 12 January 1979 in Łódź) is a Polish politician and local government official who has been serving as a member of the Sejm since 2019. Elected as a Member of the European Parliament in 2024.

== Biography ==
He was born in Łódź. He graduated economics from the Łódź University of Technology. He completed postgraduate studies in law and administration at the University of Łódź. In 2000, he joined the Democratic Left Alliance (SLD). In 2002, he unsuccessfully ran for the Łódź City Council. From 2003 to 2006, he was the chairman of the Federation of Young Social Democrats in Łódź. In the 2006 elections, he was elected a councilor of Łódź, receiving 1508 votes.

Until 2007, he worked at the Łódź Tourist Enterprise, where he became the chief development specialist. Then, he worked as a specialist at the Voivodeship Fund for Environmental Protection and Water Management in Łódź for several months. From June 2007 to February 2010, he served as deputy director at the Voivodeship Labor Office in Łódź.

He was one of the initiators of the local referendum to recall Jerzy Kropiwnicki from the position of Mayor of Łódź. After the successful referendum in February 2010, he became the chairman of the regional council of the Democratic Left Alliance in Łódź Voivodeship. In the same month, he was appointed deputy mayor of Łódź, serving until December 2010. In the 2010 Polish local elections, he was the SLD candidate for mayor of Łódź. In the first round of the election on 22 November 2010, he received 49,101 votes (24.01%), placing second among the candidates. In the second round, he received 51,426 votes (39.35%), losing to Hanna Zdanowska, the candidate of the Civic Platform. In the same elections, he won a seat in the Łódź Voivodeship Sejmik IV term, with 18,275 votes.

In the 2011 Polish parliamentary election, he ran for the Sejm from the SLD list in the Łódź electoral district. He received 15,164 votes and won a seat as the only representative from this list. On 7 November 2011, he was elected spokesperson for the SLD parliamentary club, and on 10 December of the same year, he became the party's spokesperson. From 30 May 2015 to 23 January 2016, he served as vice-chairman of the SLD. In the 2015 Polish parliamentary election, he did not win re-election. In January 2016, he returned to the position of deputy director at the Voivodeship Labor Office in Łódź.

On 1 February 2016, he resigned as the party's spokesperson. In February 2016, he co-founded the Polish Initiative association. On 8 April 2017, he resigned from SLD membership. In the 2018 Polish local elections, he was the Civic Coalition candidate for the Łódź regional assembly; he won the seat in the VI term with 18,275 votes. In June 2019, after registering Polish Initiative as a political party, he joined its board.

In January 2019, he became vice president of the Łódź Aquapark Fala. In the 2019 Polish parliamentary election, he won a seat in the Sejm, running from the Civic Coalition list, receiving 11,999 votes.

In 2023, together with Michał Szczerba, he published a book titled Wielkie żniwa. Jak PiS ukradł Polskę, based on widely commented parliamentary inspections conducted during the IX term of the Sejm. In the 2023 Polish parliamentary election, he led the KO list in the Łódź district; he received 87,470 votes, securing a seat in the Sejm X term. On 19 December 2023, he was elected chairman of the Sejm committee regarding Law and Justice's insistence of the 2020 Polish presidential election to be held by post, viewed by a non-binding declaration of the Polish Supreme Court to be illegal.
