= 2027 Częstochowa mayoral election =

- City president
- 24 January 2027

- City council
- 24 January 2027
- All 25 seats in the Kraków City Council; 13 seats needed for a majority
President before
Łukasz Pabiś (Acting)

The 2027 Częstochowa mayoral election will be held on 24 January 2027 in Częstochowa to fill a vacancy left after the recall of Krzysztof Matyjaszczyk and the Częstochowa City Council on 25 October 2026.

== Electoral system ==
Snap mayoral elections are held earlier if the office becomes vacant due to the death, resignation, or removal of the incumbent. In this case, they are held within 90 days of the premature end of a mayoral term. The Prime Minister of Poland is responsible for setting the date of a snap mayoral election. However, the election may also take place after the 90-day deadline due to legal protests against the election filed with a court. In the time between the recall and snap election, the commissar—acting president of the city president—fulfills the office's administrative roles for the period of the vacancy. The office of commissar is appointed by the Prime Minister. Ultimately, elections for city president and to the Częstochowa City Council were scheduled to be held on 24 January 2027.

The city president is elected for using the two-round system; if no candidate receives a majority of the vote in the first round, a run-off is held between the top two candidates. The city president-elect takes the oath of office before the City Council.

In order to be registered to contest the election, a candidate must be a Polish citizen, be at least 25 years old on the day of the first round of the election, a candidate must have collected at least 3,000 voters' signatures. However, there is no formal requirement to be a permanent resident of the city.

== Recall referendum ==
=== Mayoral recall referendum ===
Choice	Votes	%
For	49,952	96.97
Against	1,563	3.03
Total	51,515	100.00
Valid votes	51,515	99.33
Invalid/blank votes	348	0.67
Total votes	51,863	100.00
Registered voters/turnout	158,273	32.77

=== City council recall referendum ===
Choice	Votes	%
For	49,449	96.24
Against	1,933	3.76
Total	51,382	100.00
Valid votes	51,382	99.11
Invalid/blank votes	462	0.89
Total votes	51,844	100.00
Registered voters/turnout	158,273	32.76

== Timeline ==
The official electoral calendar was:

Timeline of the 2027 Częstochowa mayoral election

Date	Event description
On the date the ordinance enters into force	Providing public information in the form of a notice by the Silesian Voivode, the ordinance of the Prime Minister regarding early elections of the City president of Częstochowa in the Silesian Voivodeship
Until 30 November 2026	Providing public information in the form of a notice about the designated seat of the Municipal Electoral Commission in Częstochowa
Until 30 November 2026	Notification of the Electoral Commissioner in Częstochowa I about the establishment of an electoral committee and the intention to nominate candidates for the City president of Częstochowa
Until 10 December 2026	Submitting to the Electoral Commissioner in Częstochowa I candidates for members of the Municipal Electoral Commission in Częstochowa
Until 15 December 2026	Appointment of the Municipal Electoral Commission in Częstochowa by the Electoral Commissioner in Częstochowa I
Until 21 December 2026	Establishment of polling districts in medical facilities, social welfare facilities, penal institutions and detention centers, as well as in extramural departments of these establishments, as well as determination of their boundaries, consecutive number, as well as their locations
Until 28 December 2026	Providing public information in the form of a notice on the numbers and boundaries of polling districts, as well as location of district electoral commissions, including premises adapted to the needs of disabled persons, as well as the possibility of postal voting and proxy voting
Until 28 December 2026	Nomination to the Electoral Commissioner in Częstochowa I of candidates to district electoral commissions

Date	Event description
Until 31 December 2026 at 16:00 CET	Submitting to the Municipal Electoral Commission in Częstochowa candidates for the City president of Częstochowa
Until 4 January 2027	Establishment by the Electoral Commissioner in Częstochowa I of district electoral commissions
From 9 January 2027 until 22 January 2027 at 24:00 CET	Broadcast without payment of the election programmes, prepared by election committees by means of public radio and television broadcasters
Until 11 January 2027	Providing public information in the form of a notice, by means of posting the announcement of the Municipal Electoral Commission in Częstochowa about the registered candidates for the City president of Częstochowa
Until 11 January 2027	Notice to the Electoral Commissioner in Częstochowa I of the intention to vote by correspondence by disabled voters, including by means of overlays on ballot papers in Braille alphabet, and by voters who are 60 years of age or older on the day of voting
Until 15 January 2027	Submission of requests to draw up a certificate of proxy voting by disabled voters and by voters who are 60 years of age or older on the day of voting
On 22 January 2027 at 24:00 CET	The electoral campaign formally concludes; Election silence commences: no political broadcasts, social media posts, or issuing of new physical advertising materials is allowed
On 24 January 2027	The vote takes place between 7:00–21:00 CET

== Opinion polls ==
=== First round ===
Polling firm/Link	Fieldwork date	Sample size	Ruksza PiS	Pabiś KO	Stala KWiN	Kot NL	Strach PL2050	Others	Don't know	Lead
OGB / nawylot.tv (Note: Speculative list of candidates put forward by the polling firm)	25 Oct 2026		21.95	19.08	11.33	5.82	2.84	38.98		2.87
