= Jan Olszewski Aid to Poles in the East Foundation =

Polish foundation

The Jan Olszewski Foundation for Aid to Poles in the East (Polish: Fundacja Pomoc Polakom na Wschodzie im. Jana Olszewskiego) is a foundation created by Polish government (State Treasury) in order to facilitate the cooperation between Polish government and Polonia in the East (primarily, former Soviet Union). Among the goals of the foundation is to provide support for Polish cultural and educational institutions abroad.

== See also ==
- Association "Polish Community"
