= Ewa Schädler =

Polish theologian and politician (born 1968)

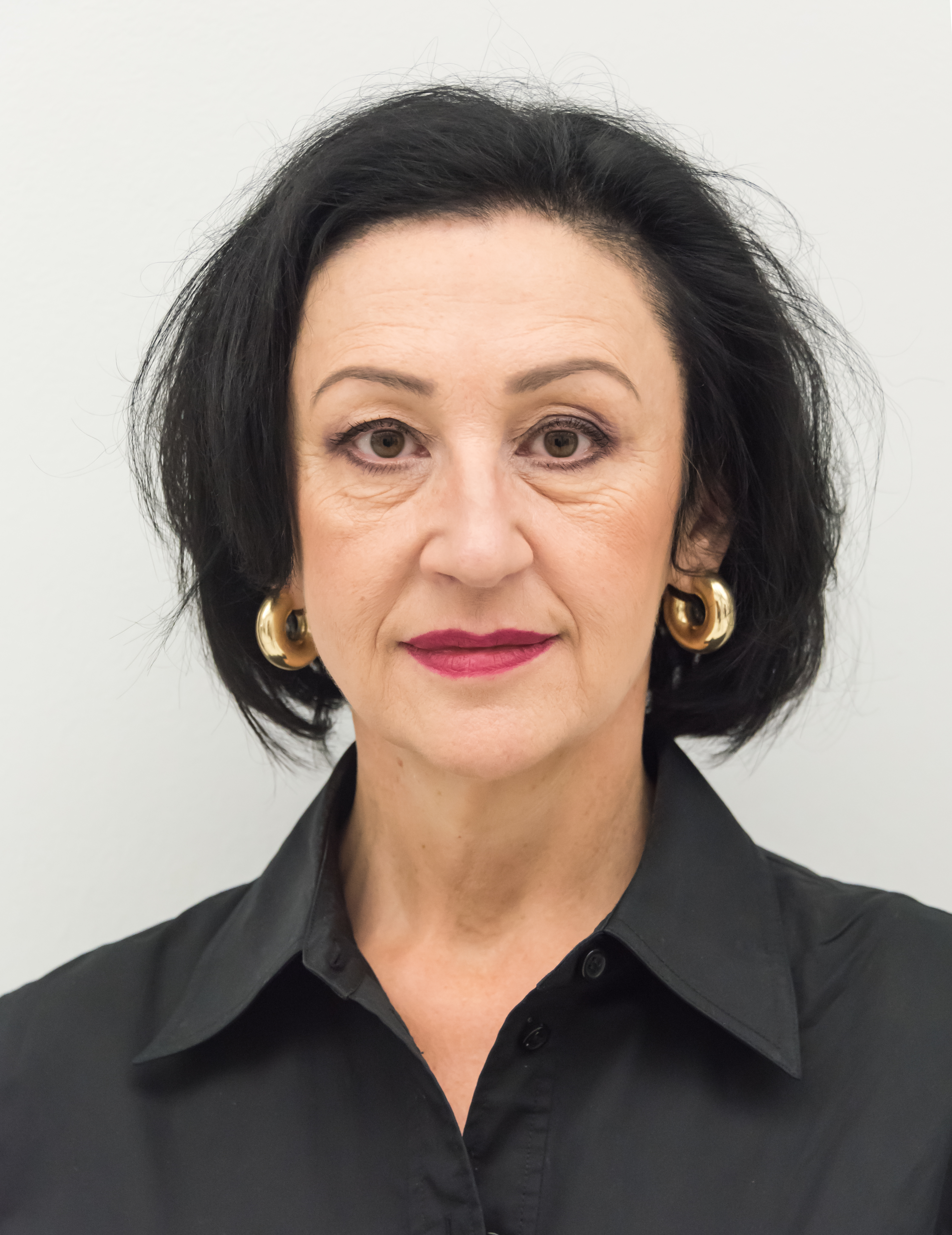
- Schädler in 2023

Member of the Sejm
- Incumbent
- Assumed office 13 November 2023
- Constituency: No. 39 (Poznań)

Personal details
- Born: 13 September 1968 (age 57)
- Party: Poland 2050
- Other political affiliations: Third Way (until 2025)

Ewa Katarzyna Schädler (née Niemczal) (born 13 September 1968 in Poznań) is a Polish theologian, entrepreneur and politician, member of parliament in the 10th term Sejm.

== Biography ==
She graduated high school in Środa Wielkopolska, later studying fundamental theology at the Catholic University of Lublin (KUL). She studied also at Internationale Akademie für Philosophie in Liechtenstein in the domain of phenomenology. In 2014 at KUL she became a doctor of theology based on her work, Chrystologia fundamentalna w świetle pism Josepha Ratzingera – Benedykta XVI. She worked as a hotel manager in Liechtenstein, owned a restaurant in Środa Wielkopolska, and worked also in the branch of real estate. She also led an agritourist holding in Środa powiat.

In 2020 she engaged herself in the presidential campaign of Szymon Hołownia. She joined his party, Poland 2050, becoming the regional party leader in the Greater Polish voivodeship and in Poznań. In the 2023 parliamentary election, she was elected to the Sejm with 33,815 votes, running from the electoral list of the Third Way in Sejm Constituency 39 in Poznań. In 2026, she became the vice-chair of the party following the victory of Katarzyna Pełczyńska-Nałęcz in the 2026 leadership election.

== Private life ==
She is the daughter of Edmund and Teresa. She is married to Hans-Walter Schädler, an olympic alpine skier from Liechtenstein.
