= 2025 Polish People's Party leadership election =

Polish election 2025

- 15 November 2025
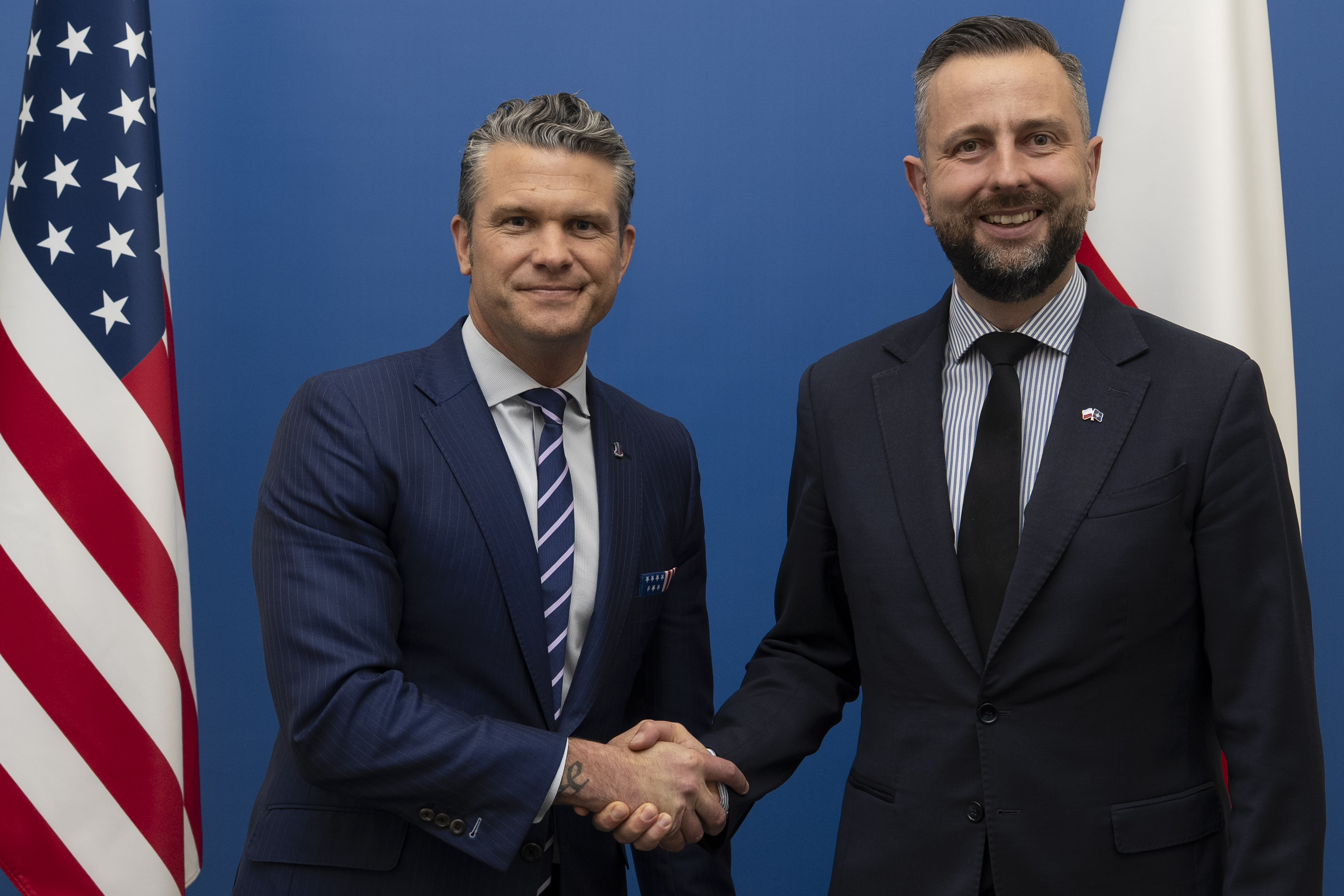
| Candidate | Władysław Kosiniak-Kamysz |
| Popular vote | 946 |
| Percentage | 98.85% |
Chairman before election
Władysław Kosiniak-Kamysz
Elected Chairman
Władysław Kosiniak-Kamysz

The 2025 Polish People's Party leadership election was held on 15 November 2025 at the 14th Polish People's Party Congress in Warsaw. Incumbent leader Władysław Kosiniak-Kamysz was unopposed for the position, and re-elected to the position almost unanimously, winning the vote of all but 11 delegates.

== Election ==
The election was held on 15 November 2025 at the 14th Polish People's Party Congress in Warsaw. Incumbent chairman Władysław Kosiniak-Kamysz was re-elected with 99% of delegates supporting him. In the election for the Head of the Supreme Council, incumbent Waldemar Pawlak was resoundingly defeated by Piotr Zgorzelski, with Zgorzelski supported by 77% of delegates against Pawlak's 23%.

== Results ==
=== Party chairman ===
| Candidate | Vote | % |
|---|---|---|
| Władysław Kosiniak-Kamysz ✓ | 946 | 98.85 |
| Against | 10 | 1.04 |
| Total | 956 | 99.90 |
| Abstain | 1 | 0.10 |
| Blank/Invalid | 0 | — |
| Total votes | 957 | 100.00 |
Source: Rzeczpospolita

=== Head of the Supreme Council ===
| Candidate | Vote | % |
|---|---|---|
| Piotr Zgorzelski ✓ | 678 | 77.40 |
| Waldemar Pawlak | 198 | 22.60 |
| Total | 876 | 100.00 |
| Abstain | 0 | — |
| Blank/Invalid | 0 | — |
| Total votes | 876 | 100.00 |
Source: Onet
