= Jerzy Wenderlich =

Polish politician (born 1954)

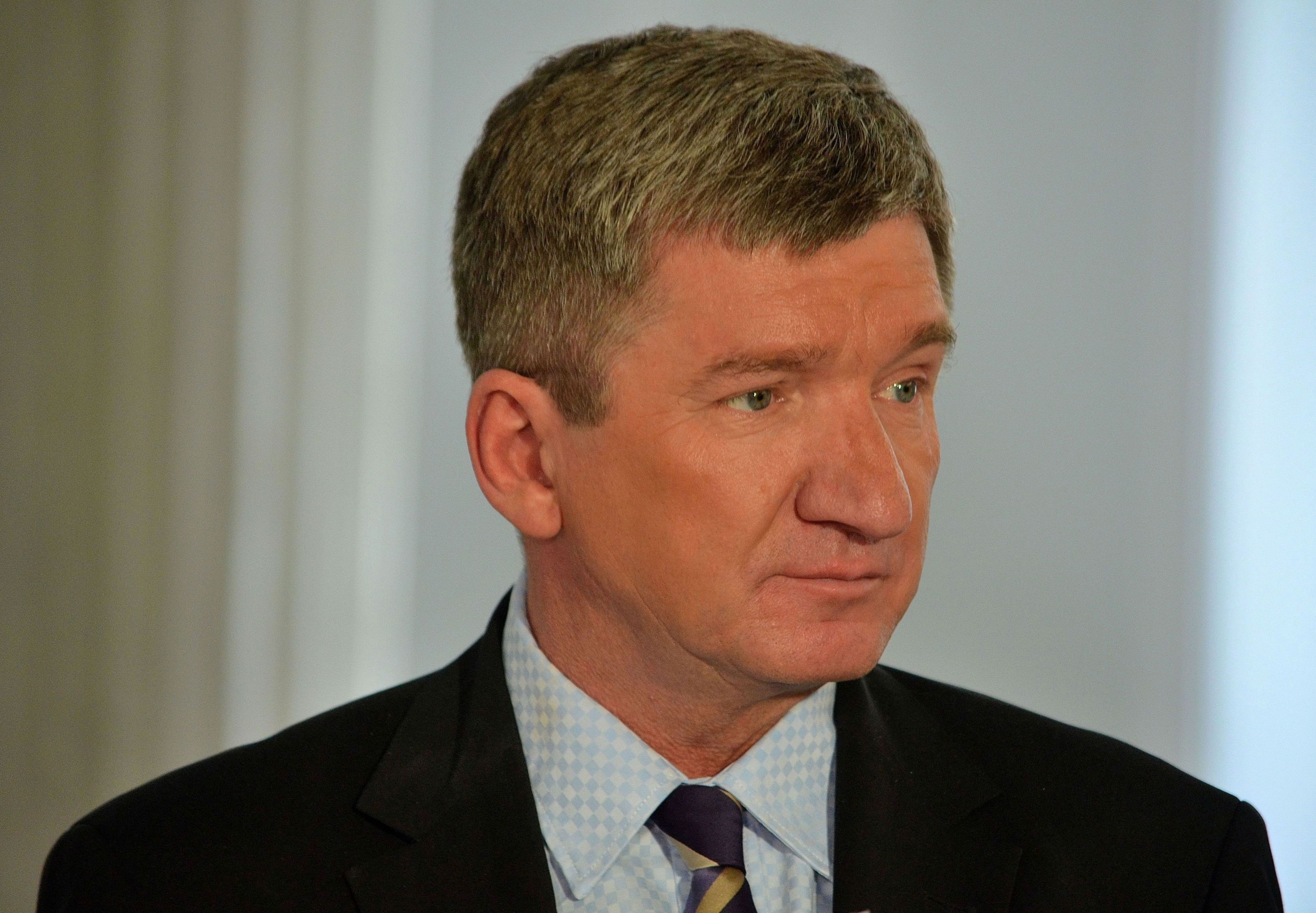

Marshal of the Sejm
- In office 23 June 2015 – 25 June 2015; Acting
- Preceded by: Radosław Sikorski
- Succeeded by: Małgorzata Kidawa-Błońska
- In office 22 September 2014 – 24 September 2014; Acting
- Preceded by: Ewa Kopacz
- Succeeded by: Radosław Sikorski

Deputy Marshal of Sejm
- In office 8 July 2010 – 11 November 2015

Member of the Sejm
- In office 14 October 1993 – 11 November 2015
- Constituency: 5 – Toruń

Personal details
- Born: 22 April 1954 (age 72) Toruń, Poland
- Party: Democratic Left Alliance

Jerzy Jan Wenderlich (pronounced [ˈjɛʐɨ ˈvɛndɛrlix]; born 22 April 1954 in Toruń) is a Polish politician. He was initially elected to Sejm in 1993, representing the Democratic Left Alliance, and was reelected in 1997, 2001, 2005 and 2007.

In the 2004 European Parliament elections he was a candidate of Democratic Left Alliance-Labor Union from Kuyavian-Pomeranian constituency. He polled 17,885 votes and was not elected.

He recontested the elections to the Sejm, on 25 September 2005, getting 10,761 votes in 5 Toruń district as a candidate from the Democratic Left Alliance list. He was reelected again at the 2007 parliamentary elections.

== See also ==
- Members of Polish Sejm 2005-2007
