= Włodzimierz Czarzasty =

Polish politician (born 1960)

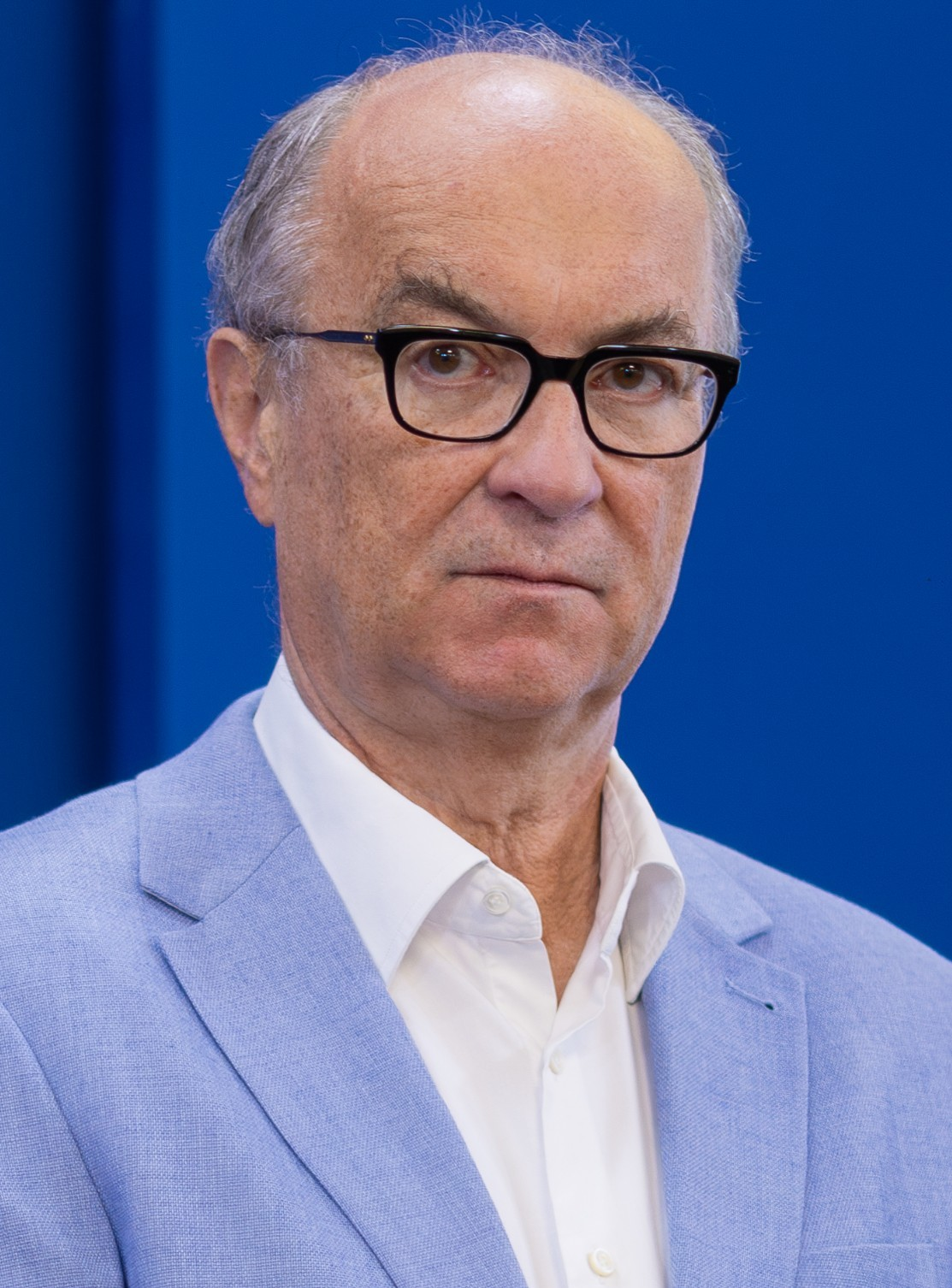
- Czarzasty in 2025

Marshal of the Sejm
- Incumbent
- Assumed office 18 November 2025
- President: Karol Nawrocki
- Preceded by: Szymon Hołownia

Deputy Marshal of the Sejm
- In office 12 November 2019 – 18 November 2025
- Marshal: Elżbieta Witek; Szymon Hołownia

Member of the Sejm
- Incumbent
- Assumed office 12 November 2019
- Constituency: 32-Sosnowiec

Leader of New Left
- Incumbent
- Assumed office 9 October 2021 Serving with Robert Biedroń (until 14 December 2025)
- Preceded by: Position established Himself (as Leader of the Democratic Left Alliance)

Leader of the Democratic Left Alliance
- In office 23 January 2016 – 9 October 2021
- Preceded by: Leszek Miller
- Succeeded by: Position abolished Himself (as Leader of New Left)

Personal details
- Born: 3 May 1960 (age 66) Warsaw, Poland
- Party: Polish United Workers' Party (1983–1990); Democratic Left Alliance/New Left (since 1990)
- Other political affiliations: United Left (2015–2016); The Left (since 2019)
- Education: University of Warsaw
- Occupation: Politician

Włodzimierz Czarzasty (born 3 May 1960) is a Polish politician who serves as the chairperson of the New Left party (Nowa Lewica). He has served as the marshal of the Sejm (Speaker) since 18 November 2025. He also served as a deputy marshal of the Sejm from 2019 to 2025.

== Biography ==
Born in Warsaw, Poland. Czarzasty graduated with degrees in journalism and political science from the University of Warsaw in the 1980s. Simultaneously, he was a member of Polish Students' Association (ZSP), leader of association Ordynacka, and a member of the communist Polish United Workers' Party (PZPR) from 1983 to 1990.

Following the fall of Communism, Czarzasty became a member of SLD, the successor of PZPR. In the 1997 general election, he ran for the SLD but lost. In May 1999, he was appointed to the National Broadcasting Council by the President Aleksander Kwasniewski. He became a point of controversy during the Rywin corruption scandal, but he was not formally charged with any crime.

After a long extra-parliamentary career, Czarzasty ran as part of United Left (ZL) party in the 2015 election. Since ZL did not pass the 8% threshold required to hold seats in the Sejm, none of the candidates, including Czarzasty, won.

During the party leadership election in January 2016, Czarzasty defeated former MP Jerzy Wenderlich and was elected as the new president of Democratic Left Alliance, replacing the incumbent leader and former Prime Minister Leszek Miller. He was a candidate for the Masovian Regional Assembly during the local elections in 2018, but lost.

=== Sejm ===
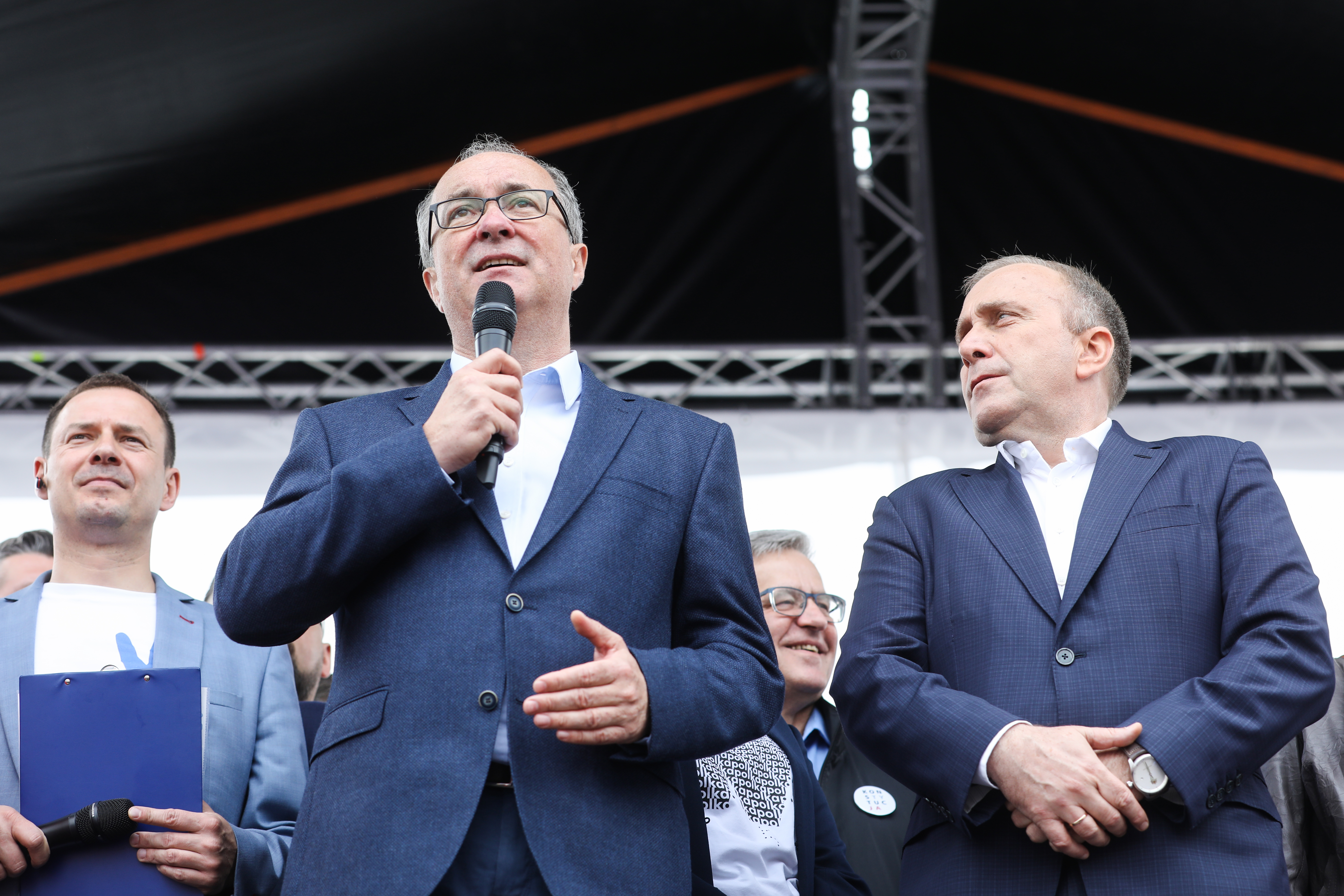
Włodzimierz Czarzasty and Grzegorz Schetyna at the European Coalition rally

In the 2019 parliamentary election, Czarzasty co-led the Lewica coalition, together with Adrian Zandberg and Robert Biedroń, and was elected to the Sejm. He was a candidate from Sosnowiec constituency. On 12 November 2019, Czarzasty was elected Deputy Marshal of the Sejm in representation of Lewica.

In July 2021, Czarzasty suspended the party member rights of Karolina Pawliczak and five other New Left MPs after they disagreed with him and made their disagreement public. The suspended politicians sent a letter to Czarzasty in which they questioned the fact that certain political commitments were made on behalf of the party, and allowed their letter to be public. Czarzasty accused them of an action grossly violating the obligation to care for the good name of the party. Pawliczak said: "Democracy, not bullying; talking, not suspending and expelling from the party ... I want to continue building such a democratic party with my friends."

In the 2023 elections, he successfully ran for parliamentary re-election, winning 22,332 votes. On 13 November of that year, he was elected Deputy Marshal of the Sejm under Szymon Hołownia.

On 5 February 2026, US ambassador to Poland Tom Rose announced that the United States would have “no further dealings, contacts, or communications” with Czarzasty in response to what Rose said were “outrageous and unprovoked insults directed against President Trump.

== Electoral history ==
Sejm
Year	Electoral list	Constituency	Votes received			Result	Ref
Year	Electoral list	Constituency	Total	%	+/−	Result	Ref
1997	Democratic Left Alliance	No. 51 (Zamość)	4,890	3.05	—	Not elected	
2015	United Left	No. 16 (Płock)	13,156	4.38	+1.33	Not elected	
2019	The Left (Note: Officially registered as Democratic Left Alliance party list, which also included candidates from other The Left coalition parties.)	No. 32 (Katowice III)	31,244	9.31	+4.93	Elected	
2023	The Left (Note: Officially registered as New Left party list, which also included candidates from other The Left coalition parties.)	No. 32 (Katowice III)	22,332	5.91	−3.40	Elected	

Masovian Voivodeship Sejmik
Year	Electoral list	Constituency	Votes received			Result	Ref
Year	Electoral list	Constituency	Total	%	+/−	Result	Ref
2018	SLD Left Together	No. 4	11,792	3.22	—	Not elected	

== Notes ==
Political offices
Preceded by Szymon Hołownia	Marshal of the Sejm; 2025–present	Incumbent
Order of precedence
Preceded by Karol Nawrocki as President	Order of precedence of Poland; Marshal of the Sejm	Succeeded by Małgorzata Kidawa-Błońska as Marshal of the Senate
