= Tomasz Trela =

Polish politician (born 1979)

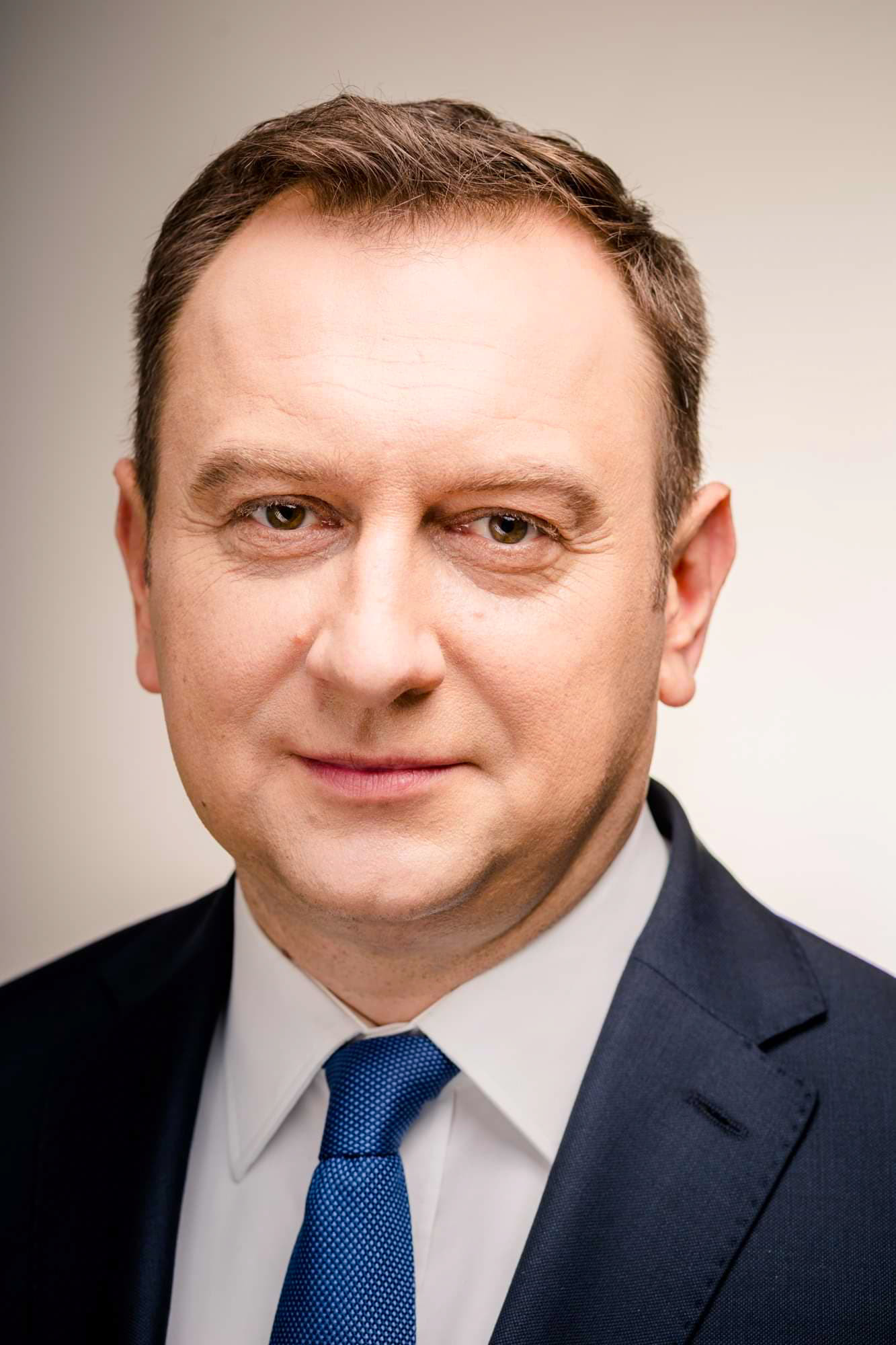
- Trela in 2020

Member of the Sejm
- Incumbent
- Assumed office 12 November 2019
- Constituency: Łódź

Personal details
- Born: 30 December 1979 (age 46)
- Party: New Left

Tomasz Trela (born 30 December 1979) is a Polish politician serving as a member of the Sejm since 2019. From 2014 to 2019, he served as deputy mayor of Łódź.
