= List of Sejm members (2019–2023) =

9th term of the Sejm

The 9th term of the Sejm, the lower house of the parliament of Poland, convened from 12 November 2019 to 12 November 2023. The house was elected at the 2019 Polish parliamentary election.

== Officers ==
Name		Party	
Antoni Macierewicz	Senior Marshal	Prawo i Sprawiedliwość	12 November 2023
Elżbieta Witek	Marshal	Prawo i Sprawiedliwość	12 November 2023
Włodzimierz Czarzasty	Deputy Marshals	Lewica (Razem, Sojusz Lewicy Demokratycznej, Wiosna Roberta Biedronia)	12 November 2023
Małgorzata Gosiewska	Deputy Marshals	Prawo i Sprawiedliwość	12 November 2023
Małgorzata Kidawa-Błońska	Deputy Marshals	Koalicja Obywatelska – Platforma Obywatelska, Nowoczesna, Inicjatywa Polska, Zieloni	12 November 2023
Ryszard Terlecki	Deputy Marshals	Prawo i Sprawiedliwość	12 November 2023
Piotr Zgorzelski	Deputy Marshals	Koalicja Polska – PSL, UED, Conservatives	12 November 2023

== Members of Sejm ==
Prawo i Sprawiedliwość
Andrzej Adamczyk; Adam Andruszkiewicz; Waldemar Andzel; Jan Ardanowski; Iwona Arent; Marek Ast; Zbigniew Babalski; Piotr Babinetz; Ryszard Bartosik; Barbara Bartuś; Mieczysław Baszko; Dariusz Bąk; Mariusz Błaszczak; Rafał Bochenek; Joanna Borowiak; Kamil Bortniczuk; Bożena Borys-Szopa; Waldemar Buda; Lidia Burzyńska; Zbigniew Chmielowiec; Kazimierz Choma; Dominika Chorosińska; Tadeusz Chrzan; Anna Cicholska; Michał Cieślak; Tadeusz Cymański; Krzysztof Czarnecki; Przemysław Czarnecki; Witold Czarnecki; Przemysław Czarnek; Arkadiusz Czartoryski; Anita Czerwińska; Katarzyna Czochara; Anna Dąbrowska-Banaszek; Leszek Dobrzyński; Zbigniew Dolata; Bartłomiej Dorywalski; Przemysław Drabek; Elżbieta Duda; Jan Duda; Marcin Duszek; Michał Dworczyk; Jan Dziedziczak; Barbara Dziuk; Jadwiga Emilewicz; Ewa Filipiak; Radosław Fogiel; Leszek Galemba; Adam Gawęda; Andrzej Gawron; Grzegorz Gaża; Anna Gembicka; Szymon Giżyński; Teresa Glenc; Piotr Gliński; Małgorzata Golińska; Kazimierz Gołojuch	Jarosław Gonciarz; Robert Gontarz; Mariusz Gosek; Małgorzata Gosiewska; Agnieszka Górska; Maciej Górski; Marek Gróbarczyk; Andrzej Gut-Mostowy; Kazimierz Gwiazdowski; Marcin Gwóźdź; Teresa Hałas; Czesław Hoc; Zbigniew Hoffmann; Marcin Horała; Paweł Hreniak; Michał Jach; Małgorzata Janowska; Norbert Kaczmarczyk; Filip Kaczyński; Jarosław Kaczyński; Piotr Kaleta; Sebastian Kaleta; Mariusz Kałużny; Mariusz Kamiński; Jan Kanthak; Fryderyk Kapinos; Wojciech Kossakowski; Andrzej Kosztowniak; Henryk Kowalczyk; Janusz Kowalski; Bartosz Kownacki; Ewa Kozanecka; Krzysztof Kozik; Jarosław Krajewski; Wiesław Krajewski; Leonard Krasulski; Piotr Król; Anna Krupka; Andrzej Kryj; Marta Kubiak; Krzysztof Kubów; Marek Kuchciński; Maria Kurowska; Władysław Kurowski; Jacek Kurzępa; Anna Kwiecień; Marek Kwitek; Tomasz Latos; Joanna Lichocka; Krzysztof Lipiec; Paweł Lisiecki; Grzegorz Lorek; Tomasz Ławniczak; Marzena Machałek; Antoni Macierewicz; Rafał Romanowski; Marlena Maląg; Ewa Malik	Jerzy Małecki; Maciej Małecki; Krzysztof Głuchowski; Jerzy Materna; Beata Mateusiak-Pielucha; Grzegorz Matusiak; Marek Matuszewski; Kazimierz Matuszny; Anna Milczanowska; Daniel Milewski; Mateusz Morawiecki; Jan Mosiński; Kazimierz Moskal; Aleksander Mrówczyński; Arkadiusz Mularczyk; Piotr Müller; Wojciech Murdzek; Danuta Nowicka; Marcin Ociepa; Waldemar Olejniczak; Dariusz Olszewski; Jacek Osuch; Jacek Ozdoba; Anna Paluch; Teresa Pamuła; Jerzy Paul; Bolesław Piecha; Grzegorz Piechowiak; Anna Pieczarka; Dariusz Piontkowski; Kacper Płażyński; Elżbieta Płonka; Szymon Pogoda; Jerzy Polaczek; Marek Polak; Piotr Polak; Violetta Porowska; Marcin Porzucek; Grzegorz Puda; Zbigniew Rau; Urszula Rusecka; Paweł Rychlik; Tomasz Rzymkowski; Piotr Sak; Jacek Sasin; Anna Schmidt; Łukasz Schreiber; Jarosław Sellin; Edward Siarka; Anna Siarkowska; Zdzisław Sipiera; Sławomir Skwarek; Kazimierz Smoliński; Krzysztof Sobolewski; Artur Soboń; Agnieszka Soin; Katarzyna Sójka; Mirosława Stachowiak-Różecka	Dariusz Stefaniuk; Beata Strzałka; Marek Suski; Artur Szałabawka; Wojciech Szarama; Aleksandra Szczudło; Józefa Szczurek-Żelazko; Paweł Szefernaker; Andrzej Szlachta; Krzysztof Szulowski; Stanisław Szwed; Ewa Szymańska; Szymon Szynkowski vel Sęk; Janusz Śniadek; Adam Śnieżek; Lech Kołakowski; Jacek Świat; Krzysztof Tchórzewski; Robert Telus; Ryszard Terlecki; Włodzimierz Tomaszewski; Mariusz Trepka; Sylwester Tułajew; Piotr Uruski; Piotr Uściński; Marcin Warchoł; Teresa Wargocka; Robert Warwas; Jan Warzecha; Monika Pawłowska; Małgorzata Wassermann; Piotr Wawrzyk; Maciej Wąsik; Rafał Weber; Marek Wesoły; Patryk Wicher; Adam Ołdakowski; Elżbieta Witek; Grzegorz Wojciechowski; Agata Wojtyszek; Michał Woś; Elżbieta Zielińska; Grzegorz Woźniak; Tadeusz Woźniak; Michał Wójcik; Bartłomiej Wróblewski; Sławomir Zawiślak; Jarosław Zieliński; Tomasz Zieliński; Zbigniew Ziobro; Wojciech Zubowski; Ireneusz Zyska; Jacek Żalek; Leszek Kowalczyk; Iwona Kurowska
Koalicja Obywatelska – Platforma Obywatelska, Nowoczesna, Inicjatywa Polska, Zieloni
Piotr Adamowicz; Tomasz Aniśko; Urszula Augustyn; Tadeusz Aziewicz; Mateusz Bochenek; Jerzy Borowczak; Piotr Borys; Borys Budka; Małgorzata Chmiel; Janusz Cichoń; Adam Cyrański; Zofia Czernow; Eugeniusz Czykwin; Barbara Dolniak; Waldy Dzikowski; Joanna Fabisiak; Magdalena Filiks; Joanna Frydrych; Konrad Frysztak; Krzysztof Gadowski; Aleksandra Gajewska; Kinga Gajewska; Elżbieta Gapińska; Kamila Gasiuk-Pihowicz; Elżbieta Gelert; Tomasz Głogowski; Marta Golbik; Cezary Grabarczyk; Krzysztof Grabczuk; Jan Grabiec; Rafał Grupiński; Agnieszka Hanajczyk	Jerzy Hardie-Douglas; Iwona Hartwich; Marek Hok; Klaudia Jachira; Maria Janyska; Michał Jaros; Joanna Jaśkowiak; Dariusz Joński; Małgorzata Kidawa-Błońska; Marcin Kierwiński; Joanna Kluzik-Rostkowska; Ewa Kołodziej; Zbigniew Konwiński; Tomasz Kostuś; Paweł Kowal; Iwona Kozłowska; Michał Krawczyk; Robert Kropiwnicki; Wojciech Król; Marek Krząkała; Henryka Krzywonos-Strycharska; Maciej Lasek; Gabriela Lenartowicz; Tomasz Lenz; Izabela Leszczyna; Katarzyna Lubnauer; Artur Łącki; Magdalena Łośko; Arkadiusz Marchewka; Jagna Marczułajtis-Walczak; Krzysztof Mieszkowski; Rajmund Miller	Aleksander Miszalski; Czesław Mroczek; Izabela Mrzygłocka; Arkadiusz Myrcha; Grzegorz Napieralski; Sławomir Neumann; Dorota Niedziela; Małgorzata Niemczyk; Sławomir Nitras; Barbara Nowacka; Tomasz Nowak; Mirosława Nykiel; Marzena Okła-Drewnowicz; Tomasz Olichwer; Paweł Olszewski; Katarzyna Osos; Paweł Papke; Małgorzata Pępek; Krzysztof Piątkowski; Sławomir Piechota; Katarzyna Piekarska; Kazimierz Plocke; Agnieszka Pomaska; Paweł Poncyljusz; Jacek Protas; Monika Rosa; Dariusz Rosati; Grzegorz Rusiecki; Jakub Rutnicki; Marek Rząsa; Wojciech Saługa; Grzegorz Schetyna	Krystyna Sibińska; Tomasz Siemoniak; Bartłomiej Sienkiewicz; Krystyna Skowrońska; Waldemar Sługocki; Marek Sowa; Karolina Pawliczak; Franciszek Sterczewski; Michał Szczerba; Andrzej Szewiński; Hanna Gill-Piątek; Adam Szłapka; Krystyna Szumilas; Tomasz Szymański; Michał Wypij; Iwona Śledzińska-Katarasińska; Cezary Tomczyk; Małgorzata Tracz; Krzysztof Truskolaski; Robert Tyszkiewicz; Jarosław Urbaniak; Jarosław Wałęsa; Anna Wojciechowska; Marta Wcisło; Monika Wielichowska; Ryszard Wilczyński; Mariusz Witczak; Witold Zembaczyński; Urszula Zielińska; Piotr Zientarski; Tadeusz Zwiefka; Stanisław Żmijan
Left (Razem, Sojusz Lewicy Demokratycznej, Wiosna Roberta Biedronia)
Rafał Adamczyk; Romuald Ajchler; Magdalena Biejat; Wiesław Buż; Włodzimierz Czarzasty; Jacek Czerniak; Marek Dyduch; Agnieszka Dziemianowicz-Bąk; Monika Falej; Krzysztof Gawkowski; Maciej Gdula; Daria Gosek-Popiołek	Arkadiusz Iwaniak; Maciej Konieczny; Przemysław Koperski; Maciej Kopiec; Katarzyna Kotula; Katarzyna Kretkowska; Paweł Krutul; Anita Kucharska-Dziedzic; Marcin Kulasek; Beata Maciejewska; Paulina Matysiak; Wanda Nowicka	Robert Obaz; Małgorzata Prokop-Paczkowska; Marek Rutka; Joanna Scheuring-Wielgus; Małgorzata Sekuła-Szmajdzińska; Anita Sowińska; Wiesław Szczepański; Andrzej Szejna; Jan Szopiński; Krzysztof Śmiszek; Tadeusz Tomaszewski	Tomasz Trela; Katarzyna Ueberhan; Dariusz Wieczorek; Zdzisław Wolski; Bogusław Wontor; Adrian Zandberg; Marcelina Zawisza; Anna Żukowska
Koalicja Polska – PSL, UED
Władysław Bartoszewski; Paweł Bejda; Marek Biernacki; Bożena Żelazowska; Andrzej Grzyb; Mieczysław Kasprzak; Dariusz Klimczak; Władysław Kosiniak-Kamysz	Stefan Krajewski; Radosław Lubczyk; Jan Łopata; Mirosław Maliszewski; Urszula Nowogórska; Urszula Pasławska; Krzysztof Paszyk; Jacek Protasiewicz	Jarosław Rzepa; Marek Sawicki; Czesław Siekierski; Jacek Tomczak; Ireneusz Raś; Zbigniew Ziejewski; Piotr Zgorzelski	Stanisław Bukowiec; Magdalena Sroka; Iwona Michałek
Confederation Liberty and Independence
Konrad Berkowicz; Stanisław Tyszka; Grzegorz Braun	Krystian Kamiński; Janusz Korwin-Mikke; Anna Siarkowska	Krzysztof Tuduj; Krzysztof Bosak; Dobromir Sośnierz	Robert Winnicki; Michał Urbaniak
Poland 2050
Paweł Zalewski; Michał Gramatyka	Tomasz Zimoch; Joanna Mucha	Mirosław Suchoń	Paulina Hennig-Kloska
Polish Affairs
Agnieszka Ścigaj	Andrzej Sośnierz	Zbigniew Girzyński	
Kukiz'15
Stanisław Żuk	Jarosław Sachajko	Paweł Kukiz	
Polish Socialist party
Joanna Senyszyn	Robert Kwiatkowski	Andrzej Rozenek	
Independent
Bogusław Sonik; Wojciech Maksymowicz; Ryszard Galla	Jarosław Gowin; Łukasz Mejza	Zbigniew Ajchler; Jakub Kulesza	Paweł Szramka; Artur Dziambor

=== mandates expired during the term of office ===
member	expiry date	resignation	next
Marek Opioła	27 November 2019	appointment of the Vice President of the Supreme Audit Office	Waldemar Olejniczak
Władysław Dajczak	15 January 2020	appointment of the Lubuskie voivode	Jacek Kurzępa
Ewa Leniart	15 January 2020	appointment of the Podkarpackie voivode	Andrzej Szlachta
Dominik Tarczyński	1 February 2020	taking over the released mandate of a Member of the European Parliament	Mariusz Gosek
Adam Lipiński	4 November 2020	appointment as a member of the Management Board and vice-president of the National Bank of Poland	Szymon Pogoda
Jolanta Fedak	31 December 2020	Death	Łukasz Mejza
Anna Wasilewska	6 April 2021	Death	Anna Wojciechowska
Jerzy Wilk	16 May 2021	Death	Adam Ołdakowski
Killion Munyama	11 June 2021	waiver of the mandate	Zbigniew Ajchler
Łukasz Szumowski	1 February 2022	waiver of the mandate	Rafał Romanowski
Wiesław Janczyk	9 February 2022	election as a member of the Monetary Policy Council	Elżbieta Zielińska
Gabriela Masłowska	6 October 2022	election as a member of the Monetary Policy Council	Krzysztof Głuchowski
Jerzy Bielecki	24 November 2022	waiver of the mandate	Leszek Kowalczyk
Marek Zagórski	31 March 2023	waiver of the mandate	Iwona Kurowska
Riad Haidar	25 May 2023	Death	Stanisław Żmijan
Dariusz Kurzawa	23 October 2023	election as Vice-Marshal of the Kuyavian-Pomeranian Voivodeship	the seat remained vacant

== See also ==
- 2019 Polish parliamentary election
- List of Polish senators (2019–23)
