= Sejm Constituency no. 33 =

Polish parliamentary constituency

Sejm Constituency no. 33 Kielce
- Okręg wyborczy nr 33; Kielce
- Constituency for the Sejm
- Location within Poland.
- Voivodeship: Świętokrzyskie
- Population: 1,178,164 (June 2023)
- Electorate: 946,053 (2023)

Current constituency
- Created: 2001
- Deputies: 16
- Regional assembly: Świętokrzyskie Voivodeship Sejmik
- Senate constituencies: 81, 82 and 83
- EP constituency: Lesser Poland and Świętokrzyskie

Sejm Constituency no. 33 (Polish: Okręg wyborczy nr 33) is a constituency of the Sejm encompassing entire Świętokrzyskie Voivodeship and electing sixteen deputies. Constituency seat is voivodeship's capital Kielce.

== List of deputies ==
Deputies of the 9th Sejm (2019–2023)
| Deputy | Party |
|---|---|
| Bartłomiej Dorywalski | Law and Justice |
| Anna Krupka | Law and Justice |
| Andrzej Kryj | Law and Justice |
| Marek Kwitek | Law and Justice |
| Krzysztof Lipiec | Law and Justice |
| Piotr Wawrzyk | Law and Justice |
| Agata Katarzyna Wojtyszek | Law and Justice |
| Dominik Tarczyński (Note: Dominik Tarczyński was seated as a member of the 9th European Parliament on 1 February 2020 therefore his Sejm mandate expired same day. Mariusz Gosek assumed his seat in the Sejm on 12 February 2020.) | Law and Justice |
| Mariusz Gosek | Sovereign Poland (Note: Member of the Law and Justice parliamentary group.) |
| Zbigniew Ziobro | Sovereign Poland |
| Michał Cieślak | The Republicans |
| Marzena Okła-Drewnowicz | Civic Platform (Note: Member of the Civic Coalition parliamentary group.) |
| Bartłomiej Sienkiewicz | Civic Platform |
| Adam Cyrański | not sure |
| Czesław Siekierski | Polish People's Party (Note: Member of the Polish Coalition parliamentary group) |
| Krzysztof Bosak | Confederation Liberty and Independence |
| Andrzej Szejna | New Left (Note: Member of The Left parliamentary group.) |
