= Krzysztof Lisek =

Polish politician (born 1967)

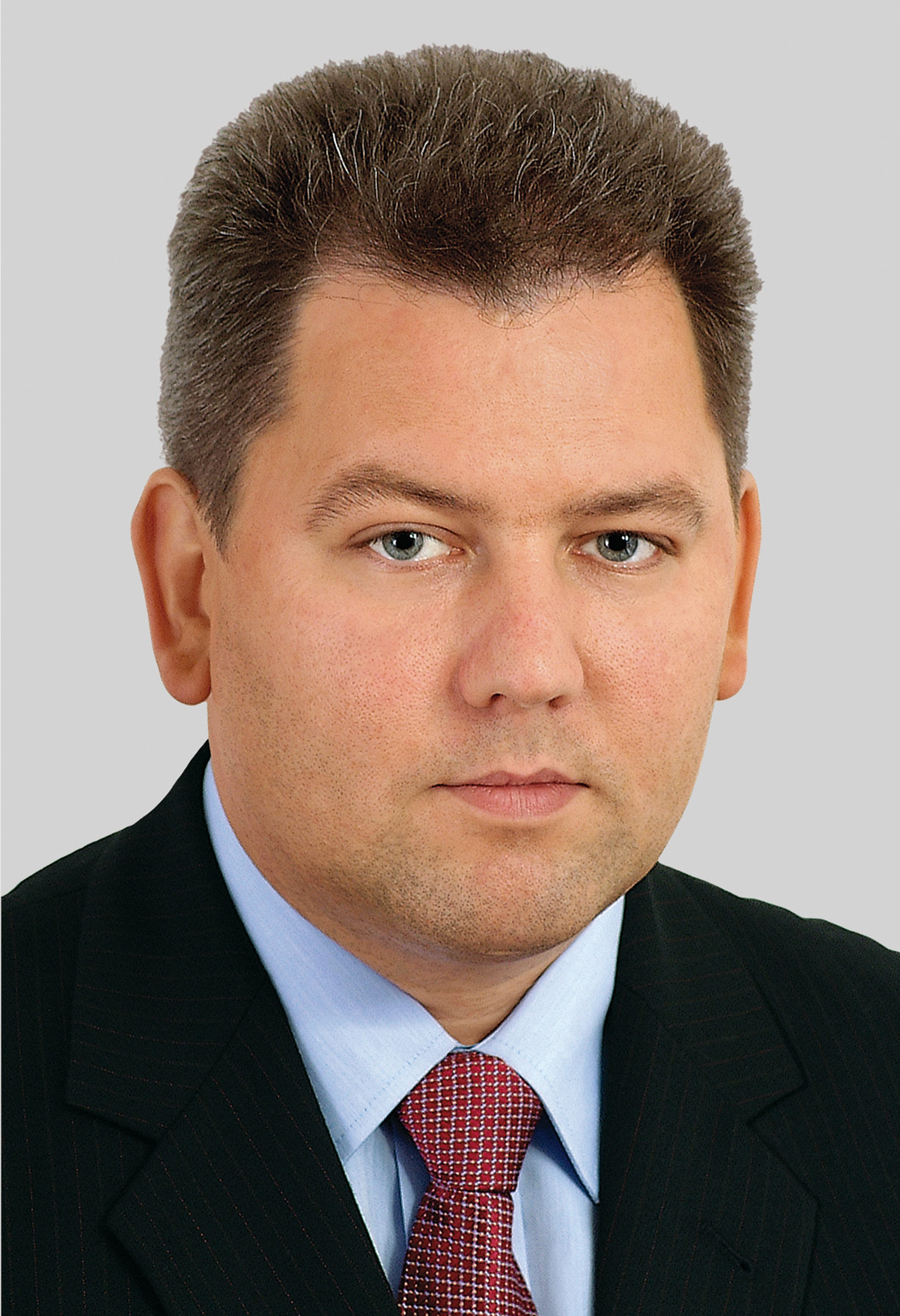

Member of the Sejm
- In office 25 September 2005 – 10 June 2009
- Constituency: 34 – Elbląg

Personal details
- Born: 28 May 1967 (age 58) Gdańsk
- Party: Civic Platform

Krzysztof Lisek (born May 28, 1967 in Gdańsk) is a Polish politician. He was elected to the Sejm on 25 September 2005 getting 10,731 votes in 34 – Elbląg for Civic Platform. He served until 2009 when he was elected as a Member of the European Parliament, serving until 2014.

== See also ==
- Members of Polish Sejm 2005-2007
