= WSEI =

WSEI may refer to:

- University of Economics and Innovation (Wyższa Szkoła Ekonomii i Innowacjii) in Lubin, Poland
- WSEI (FM) 92.9 in Olney, Illinois
