= Małgorzata Prokop-Paczkowska =

Polish politician (born 1960)

Małgorzata Barbara Prokop-Paczkowska
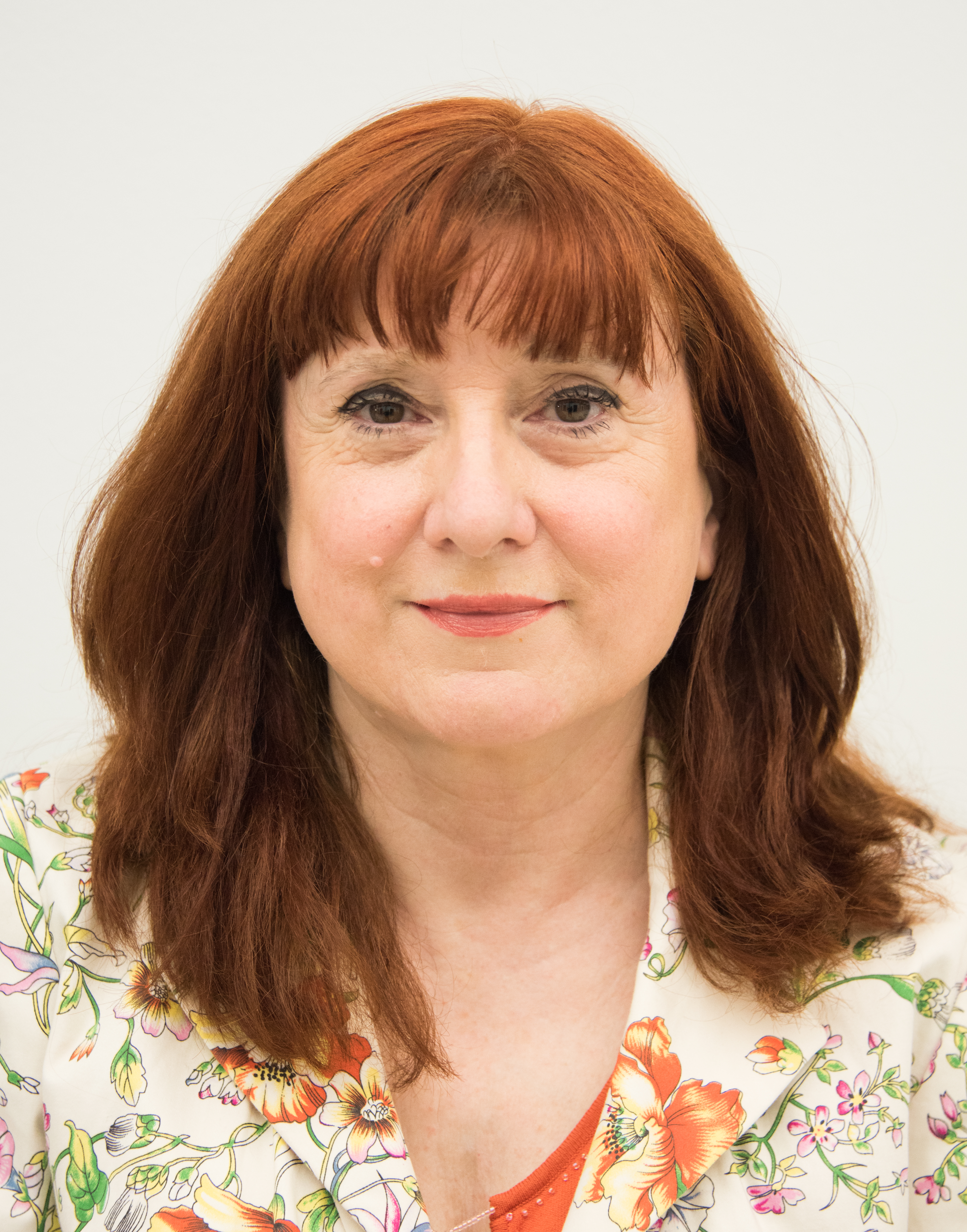

Member of the Sejm
- In office 12 November 2019 – 12 November 2023

Personal details
- Born: 27 August 1960 (age 65) Krotoszyn, Poland
- Party: New Left
- Other political affiliations: Your Movement (till 2018)

Małgorzata Prokop-Paczkowska (born 27 August 1960) is a Polish journalist, television producer and politician. Member of the Sejm representing the New Left.

== Electoral history ==
Sejm
| Election | Party | Votes | % | Constituency | Elected? |
| 2011 | Palikot's Movement | 6,432 | 1.69 | Szczecin | No |
| 2015 | United Left | 4,210 | 2.10 | Elbląg | No |
| 2019 | Democratic Left Alliance | 15,300 | 5.63 | Koszalin | Yes |

European Parliament
| Election | Party | Votes | % | Constituency | Elected? |
| 2014 | Europa Plus | 2,810 | 0.66 | Lubusz and West Pomerania | No |
| 2019 | Spring | 4,550 | 0.52 | Lubusz and West Pomerania | No |
