= Sejm Constituency no. 34 =

Polish parliamentary constituency

- Okręg wyborczy nr 34
- Constituency for the Sejm
- Counties: Bartoszyce, Braniewo, Działdowo, Elbląg (land county), Elbląg (city county), Iława, Lidzbark, Nowe Miasto and Ostróda
- Voivodeship: Warmian-Masurian

Current constituency
- Created: 2001
- Seats: 8
- Regional assembly: Warmian–Masurian Voivodeship Sejmik
- Senate constituency: no. 84 and 85
- EP constituency: Podlaskie and Warmian-Masurian

Elbląg is a Polish parliamentary constituency in the Warmian-Masurian Voivodeship. It elects eight members of the Sejm.

The district has the number '34' for elections to the Sejm and is named after the city of Elbląg. It includes the counties of Bartoszyce, Braniewo, Działdowo, Elbląg, Iława, Lidzbark, Nowe Miasto, and Ostróda, and the city county of Elbląg.

== List of deputies ==
Deputies of the 9th Sejm (2019–2023)
Deputy	Party
Zbigniew Babalski	Law and Justice
Robert Gontarz	Law and Justice
Leonard Krasulski	Law and Justice
Adam Ołdakowski (Note: Jerzy Wilk died on 16 May 2021. Adam Ołdakowski replaced him on 28 May 2021.)	Law and Justice
Jerzy Wilk	Law and Justice
Elżbieta Gelert	Civic Coalition
Jacek Protas	Civic Coalition
Monika Falej	The Left
Zbigniew Ziejewski	Polish People's Party (Note: Polish Coalition in parlament.)
