= Mariusz Gosek =

Polish politician (born 1982)

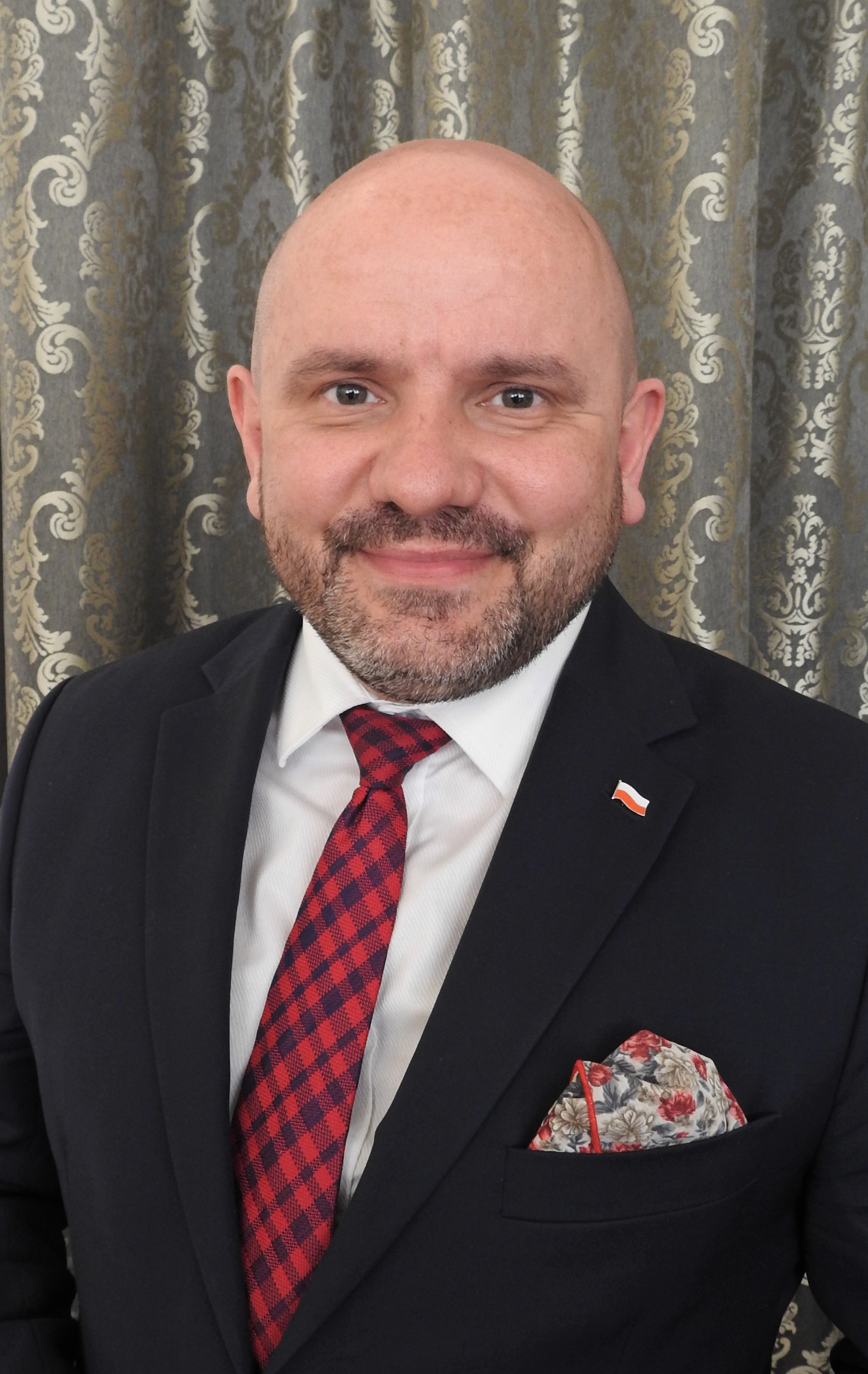
- Gosek in 2023

Member of the Sejm
- Incumbent
- Assumed office 12 February 2020
- Preceded by: Dominik Tarczyński
- Constituency: Kielce

Personal details
- Born: 20 August 1982 (age 43)
- Party: Law and Justice (since 2024)
- Other political affiliations: Sovereign Poland (until 2024)

Mariusz Gosek (born 20 August 1982) is a Polish politician serving as a member of the Sejm since 2020. From 2018 to 2020, he was a member of the Świętokrzyskie Voivodeship Sejmik.
