= Stanisław Żuk =

Polish engineer and politician

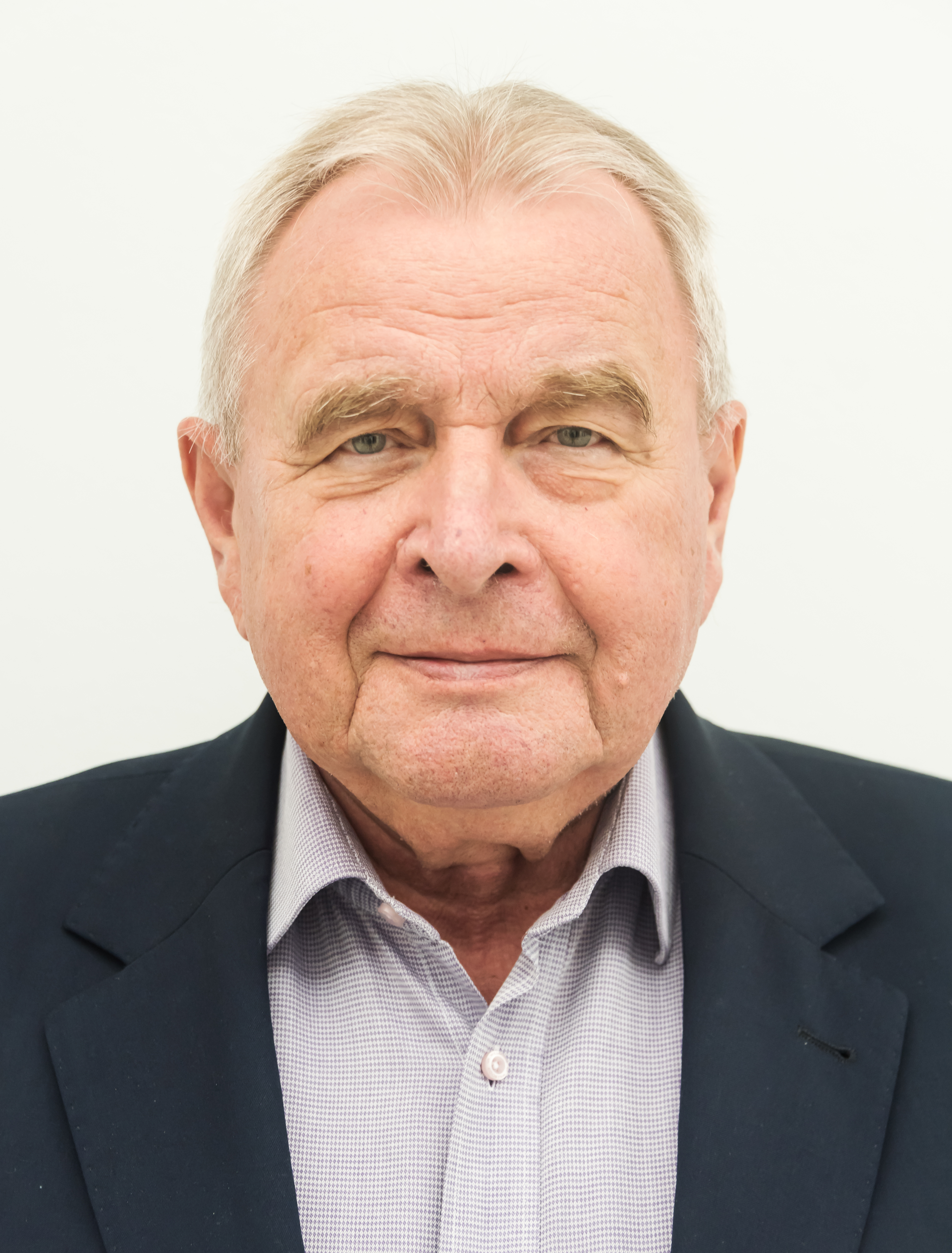

Member of the Sejm of the ninth parliamentary term
- Incumbent
- Assumed office 2019

Personal details
- Born: October 1, 1954 (age 71) Plinkajmy, Poland
- Education: AGH University of Krakow
- Occupation: Engineer, manager, politician

Stanisław Adam Żuk (born 1 October 1954 in Plinkajmy, Poland) is a Polish engineer, manager in the mining and energy industry, local government officer and politician, MP for the Sejm of the 9th parliamentary term.

== Biography ==
He holds a master's degree in mining engineering and graduated from the AGH University of Science and Technology in Kraków. He also completed postgraduate studies in management. In 1974, he started working at Kopalnia Węgla Brunatnego Turów in Bogatynia, initially as a labourer. He was gradually promoted and became interim manager of the mine in 1999. From 2000 to 2010, he was president of the board of directors, later becoming branch manager until 2013. From 2004 to 2018, he headed the Employers' Association of the Lignite Producers Agreement. He also became vice-president of the management board of PGE Mining and Conventional Power Generation.

He has been involved in local government since the 1990s. Between 1994 and 1998, he was a municipal councillor in Zawidów and a delegate to the Jeleniogórskie Voivodeship Local Government Assembly. In 1998, he was elected as a councillor of the Lower Silesian Voivodeship Sejmik of the first term on behalf of the Solidarity Electoral Action, in which he sat until 2002. From 2002 to 2018, he was a councillor in the Zgorzelec County and served as Chairman of the Poviat Council. He was elected a councillor successively on behalf of KWW Porozumienie Prawicy (2002), Law and Justice (2006) and Civic Platform (2010, 2014). In 2015, he re-affiliated with the Law and Justice party. In 2018, he did not stand as a candidate in the local elections.

In the 2019 parliamentary elections, he ran for the Sejm from constituency 1 (Legnica) as a representative of the Kukiz'15 movement on the list of the Polish People's Party. He was elected as an MP for the ninth term, receiving 7694 votes. In December 2020, together with other Kukiz'15 MPs, he found himself outside the Polish Coalition parliamentary club, becoming an unaffiliated MP. In February 2021, he became a member of the newly established Kukiz'15 parliamentary club, Demokracja Bezpośrednia.

== Awards ==
- Knight's Cross of the Order of Polonia Restituta (2012)
- Gold Cross of Merit (2001)
- Silver Cross of Merit (1997)
- Medal of the 100th Anniversary of Regaining Independence
- Title of honorary citizen of Zawidów

== Private life ==
Son of Wacław and Jadwiga. Married, has three children: a daughter and two sons. Lives in Zawidów.
