= Polish cash-for-visa scandal =

2023 political scandal

The Polish cash-for-visa scandal (Polish: afera wizowa, lit. 'visa affair', also called: Polish: mafia wizowa, lit. 'visa mafia') was a political scandal concerning alleged corruption in the granting of travel visas by officials of the Polish Ministry of Foreign Affairs and the Polish consular service. The majority of recipients left Poland for other Schengen Area countries or for North America. According to critics, up to 350,000 visas may have been illegally issued in return for bribes.

== The scheme ==
The alleged scheme, which was uncovered through investigative reporting, involves potential migrants paying an intermediary and then being granted visas more quickly than usual and with only cursory checks. As Poland is a member of the Schengen Area, a recipient of a Polish visa can move on to other Schengen Area countries.

Polish consulates are alleged to have received from the Ministry of Foreign Affairs lists of names who were to be issued entry visas to Poland without further checks. Immigrants with visas issued in this way travelled first to Poland before moving on to other Schengen Area countries, the United States, or other countries of the global north, posing as tourist groups or Bollywood film crews. People reportedly paid up to $45,000 for a Polish visa and transfer to the United States.

Statisticians estimated that up to 350,000 visas may have been illegally issued in return for bribes since 2021 in India, The Philippines, Singapore, Hong Kong, Taiwan, UAE, Qatar, and elsewhere. The visas were openly advertised on social media platforms such as TikTok.

On 19 September 2023, Civic Platform opposition MP Michał Szczerba revealed alleged documents from the Ministry of Foreign Affairs indicating that the Polish embassy in Minsk issued 784,173 visas to individuals from 65 countries (including 1,481 visas issued to people from countries other than Belarus, Russia and Ukraine) with the assistance of a Moscow-based company. Szczerba further claimed that those issued visas include people who were previously pushed back from the border during the Belarus–European Union border crisis.

== Work visas ==
In 2022, Poland gave out the largest amount of "initial stay" visas within the entire European Union, officially almost 700,000 in total. Work visas accounted for almost 3/5 of all visas given out by Poland, and Poland gave out every third work visa in the entire European Union.

According to calculations from the Lewiatan Confederation (Konfederacji Lewiatan) and Wyborcza Magazine and based in data from Poland's state Social Insurance Institution (ZUS) (Zakładu Ubezpieczeń Społecznych) and the Eurostat (Europejskiego Urzędu Statystycznego), by late 2022 approximately 80,000 Polish beneficiary visa recipients were not currently working nor conducting business practices within Poland. In 2021, almost 150,000 of these visa-holders were not registered with the ZUS, despite having a valid work visa.

== Arrests ==
Seven people were initially charged, with three being placed under temporary detention. None of them were state officials. Edgar K., one of former Deputy Minister of Foreign Affairs Piotr Wawrzyk's aides and one of the key persons in the scheme, decided to testify against his colleagues in return for a reduced sentence.

== Consequences ==
The right wing nationalist Law and Justice ruling party has long espoused a strong anti-immigrant rhetoric, frequently claiming that Poland would be overrun by illegal immigrants if the opposition came to power. The scandal at the time was said by political scientists to have hurt its chances in the upcoming election in November 2023, as opposition parties had said that the Law and Justice party was complicit. The lost votes for its United Right coalition was said to potentially transfer even further to the far-right to the Confederation party.

Former Deputy Minister of Foreign Affairs Piotr Wawrzyk, dismissed by Mateusz Morawiecki on 31 August, has been accused of playing a key role in the scheme, with his dismissal believed to be related to the scandal. Foreign Minister Zbigniew Rau was also claimed by opposition members to have given his consent to the scheme.

On 14 September, Wawrzyk was hospitalized in a life-threatening condition after what was believed to be a suicide attempt. He reportedly mentioned the scandal in a suicide note, claiming that "[he] did nothing wrong, he wanted to help people regardless of their political affiliation and paid the highest price for it" and that "he is not a briber".

The Polish government cancelled its contracts with private companies for visa processing and fired the head of its legal and compliance department.

On 17 January 2024 the Central Anticorruption Bureau detained Wawrzyk and charged him with accepting bribes. He was released on a 100,000 PLN bail, denying involvement in the scandal.

== Reactions ==
The Polish prosecutor's office, headed by Justice Minister Zbigniew Ziobro, responded in a statement blaming the leader of the opposition and Civic Platform Donald Tusk accusing him of "falsehoods" and "unrelated findings". President Andrzej Duda said he was awaiting the results of an investigation before commenting but that "at least some of the information in the media is untrue". Zbigniew Rau responded that he thought the claims were "vastly exaggerated".

Polish state media (such as Telewizja Polska, Polskie Radio, and Orlen-owned print media), which had become a de facto mouthpiece for the ruling party since controversial media legislation was passed shortly after they took power, focused on other issues, such as the spike in migrant arrivals on the Italian island of Lampedusa, or avoided reporting the news altogether.

The German Ministry of Foreign Affairs demanded an explanation from the Polish government. German chancellor Olaf Scholz blamed Poland for the increased immigration to Germany and has threatened to reinstate border controls at the border between the two Schengen zone countries.

The European Commission demanded an explanation from the Polish government concerning the granting of Schengen visas by Poland and stated that they expect a response to be given within two weeks. The initial response from the Polish Ministry of Foreign Affairs was deemed inadequate and to have not answered all the requested questions.

Locals in Kampala, Uganda protested in front of the Polish consulate due to not receiving visas they previously had paid for.
