= Riad Haidar =

Polish politician and activist

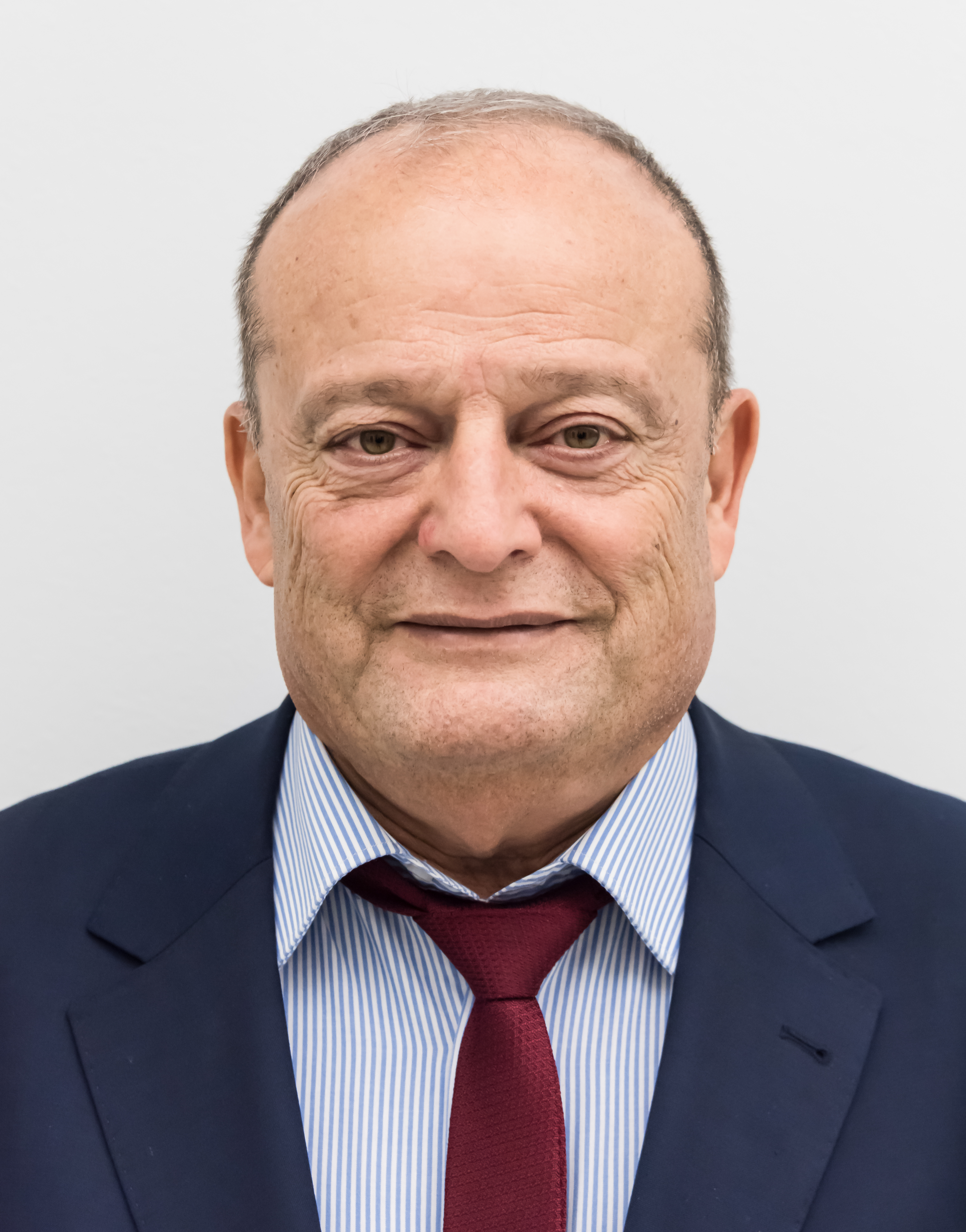
- Riad Haidar in 2020.

Member of the Sejm of Poland
- In office 12 November 2019 – 25 May 2023
- Constituency: No. 7

Member of the Lublin Voivodeship Sejmik
- In office 2010–2019
- Constituency: No. 3

Member of the City Council of Biała Podlaska
- In office 2002–2010

Personal details
- Born: 1 August 1951 Sweida, Syria
- Died: 25 May 2023 (aged 72) Lublin, Poland
- Resting place: Biała Podlaska, Poland
- Citizenship: Poland • Syria
- Party: Democratic Left Alliance (2000–2019)
- Other political affiliations: Nonpartisan (2019–2023)
- Education: Medical University of Lublin; Maria Curie-Skłodowska University; University of Economics and Innovation
- Occupation: Politician, Physician

Riad Haidar (Polish: [ˈrjat xaˈi.dar]; Arabic: رياض حيدر, romanized: Riyāḍ Ḥaydar [riːˈɑːdˤ ħaj.dar]; 1 August 1951 – 25 May 2023) was a Polish-Syrian politician, physician, and social activist. From 2019 to 2023 he was a member of the Sejm of Poland, and from 2010 to 2019 he was a member of the Lublin Voivodeship Sejmik. From 1998 to 2019 he was the medical director of the Neonatology Ward of the Voivodeship Specialist Hospital in Biała Podlaska. From 2000 to 2019 he was a member of the Democratic Left Alliance, and later was the nonpartisan politician aligned with the Civic Coalition electoral alliance, and informally aligned with the Polish Initiative.

== Biography ==
Riad Haidar was born on 1 August 1951 in Sweida, Syria, and was of Syrian descent. He received there, the bachelor degree in physics and mathematics. In 1972, he moved to Lublin, Poland. In 1981, Haidar graduated from the Medical University of Lublin (then known as the Lublin Medical Academy), becoming a pediatrist. Following graduation, he moved to Syria for a short period, and later worked in a hospital in Bayda, Libya. Eventually he returned to Poland, and was granted the Polish citizenship in 1989. In 1991, he worked at the Neonatology Ward of the Voivodeship Specialist Hospital in Biała Podlaska, and in 1999, he became the ward's medical director. While working there, he became specialised in neonatology. In 2003, he finished postgraduate studies at the Maria Curie-Skłodowska University in Lublin with a degree in healthcare project management, and in 2008, he graduated from the University of Economics and Innovation in Lublin, with a degree in the healthcare service management and administration.

For many years he was a regional chief of staff of the Biała Podlaska branch of the Great Orchestra of Christmas Charity. The ward of which he was the director of was named in his honour, the Great Orchestra of Christmas Charity Neonatology Ward.

From 2000 to 2019, Haidar was a member of the Democratic Left Alliance. From 2002 to 2010, he was a member of the City Council of Biała Podlaska. In 2010 he was elected as a member of the Lublin Voivodeship Sejmik from the constituency no. 3. He received 13,982 votes (9.57% in the constituency). He was re-elected in 2014, with 13,133 votes (9.51% in the constituency), and in 2018, with 18,826 głosów (11.93% in the constituency).

In 2019, he unsuccessfully ran for office of the member of the European Parliament from the Polish constituency no. 8 as the candidate of the European Coalition. He received 16,858 votes (2.28% in the constituency). Later, after the 2023 Polish parliamentary election, he received the seat left by Krzysztof Hetman, who resigned to become a member of the Sejm of Poland.

In 2019, Haidar left the Democratic Left Alliance, and run for office of a member of the Sejm of Poland in the 2019 parliamentary election as a nonpartisan politician, as part of the Civic Coalition electoral alliance. He run in the constituency no. 7, which consists of the eastern half of the Lublin Voivodeship. He received the mandate in the election, with 21,483 votes (5.35% in the constituency).

On 31 December 2019, Haidar's contract with his hospital came to an end. Adam Chodziński, who was appointed as the hospital director in 2019, and who was a local councilor and a member of the rival Law and Justice party, offered Haidar to continue working in the hospital as the physician, but without remaining in the office of the ward director. Haidar refused the offer, as he believed the decision of the hospital director was motivated politically. On 2 January 2020, people organised a protest in front of the hospital in Biała Podlaska, in support of Haidar. His case was supported by, among others, senator and human rights activist Adam Bodnar, and journalist and social campaigner Jerzy Owsiak. The matter became a widely-commented controversy in the Polish-language media.

In November 2020, Haidar became involved in the organisation of the local structures of the Polish Initiative party, while never formally joining it.

Haidar died on 25 May 2023 in Lublin, Poland, due to leukemia. The funeral was held in the Polish Orthodox Saint Cyril and Methodius Church in Biała Podlaska, and organised like a state funeral. He was buried in the cemetery in Biała Podlaska. On 1 June 2023, he was posthumously awarded the Knight's Cross of the Order of Polonia Restituta by the president of Poland Andrzej Duda.
