= Anna Siarkowska =

Polish politician (born 1982)

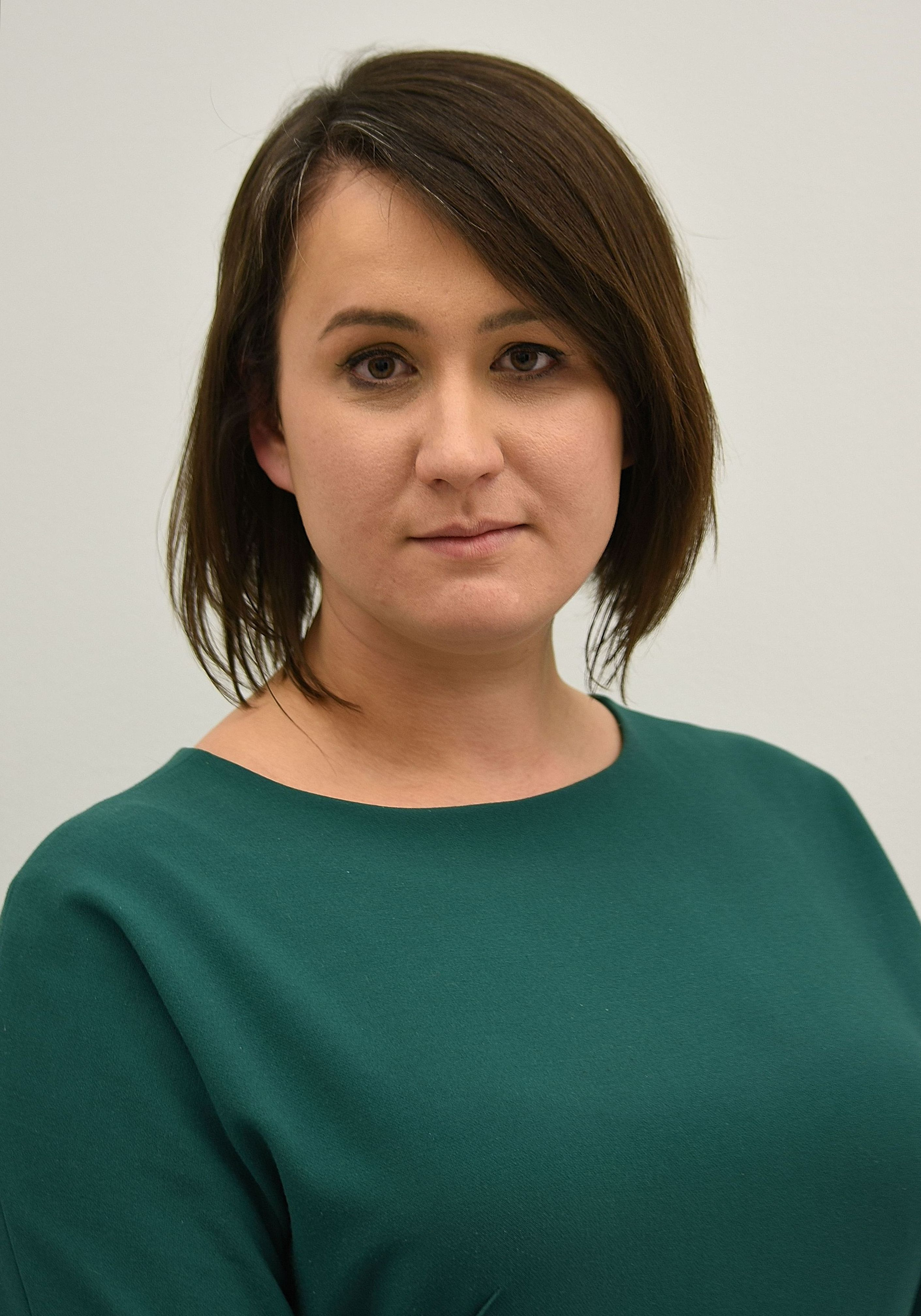
Anna Siarkowska in 2016

Anna Maria Siarkowska (née Jabłońska; born 1982 in Warsaw, Warsaw Voivodeship, Poland) is a Polish politician who was a member of the eighth and ninth terms of the Sejm. She was one of the founders of the Republican Party, and later, its leader.
