= Magdalena Filiks =

Polish politician (born 1978)

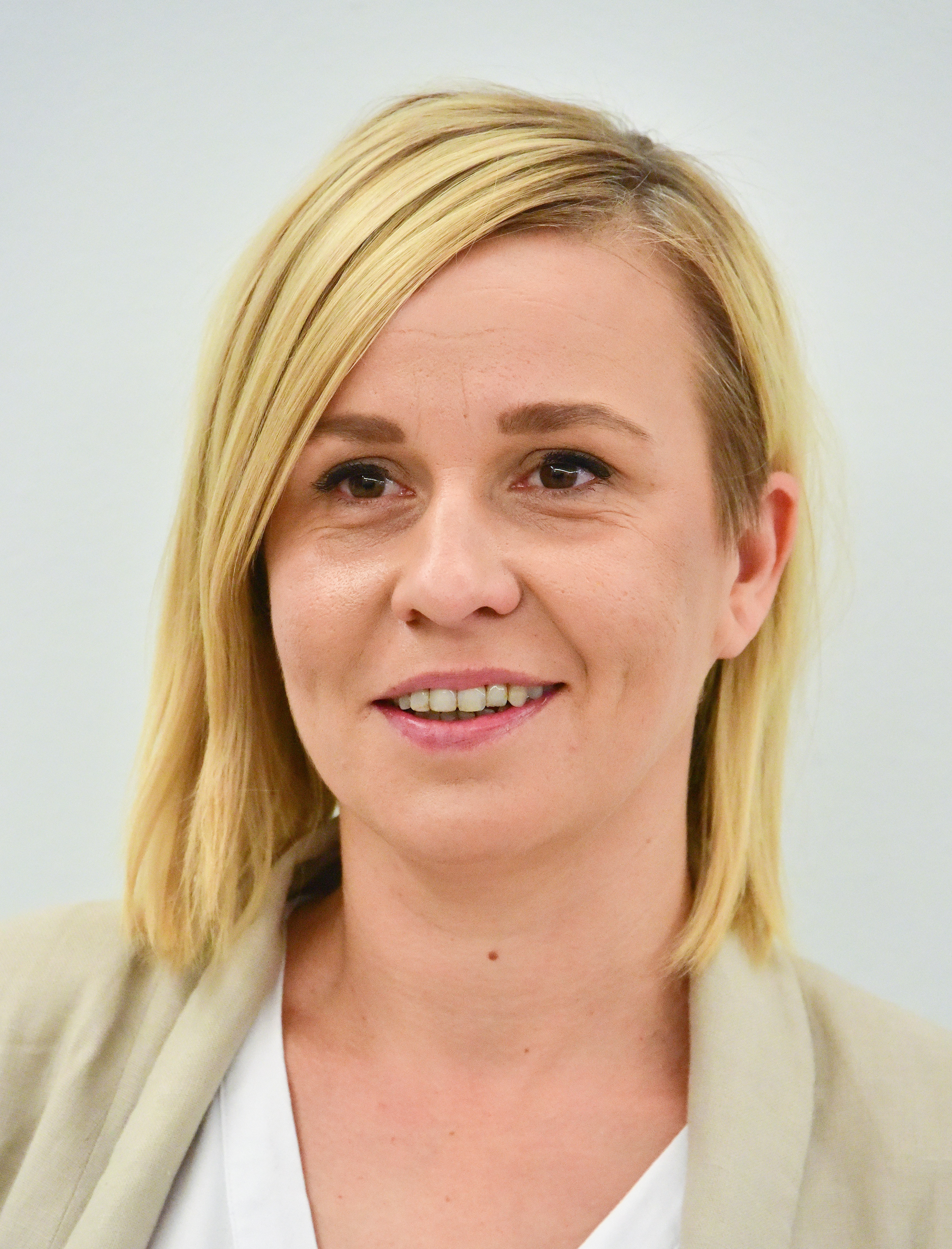

Member of Sejm 2019-2023
- Incumbent
- Assumed office 2019
- Constituency: Szczecin

Personal details
- Born: 8 December 1978 (age 47)
- Party: Civic Platform
- Children: 3 (Mikołaj, deceased; Aleksandra; Maja)
- Education: University of Szczecin (BA, MA)
- Occupation: Politician

Magdalena Filiks (born 8 December 1978) is a Polish politician. She was elected to the Sejm (9th term) representing the constituency of Szczecin in 2019.

== Personal life and education ==
Filiks was born in Barlinek in 1978. She studied at the University of Szczecin for a Bachelor of Arts (Management and Marketing), graduating in 2001, and for Masters of Arts (Management and Marketing), graduating in 2003.

== Suicide of Mikolaj Filiks ==
Her son Mikolaj, aged 15, committed suicide in February 2023 after Radio Szczecin, part of the state-run broadcaster Polskie Radio network, released a report that led to his identification as a victim of pedophile. In an ensuing controversy, the ruling Law and Justice Party was accused by the opposition of releasing the report to obtain political gain as the convicted man was a former Civic Platform member, election candidate, and an LGBT activist. Law and Justice supporters in turn have responded with accusations that the Civic Platform deliberately covered up the conviction and that the suicide was being used by the opposition for political gain. Poland's National Broadcasting Council launched an inquiry to examine if the broadcast endangered the child's welfare.
