= Piotr Wawrzyk =

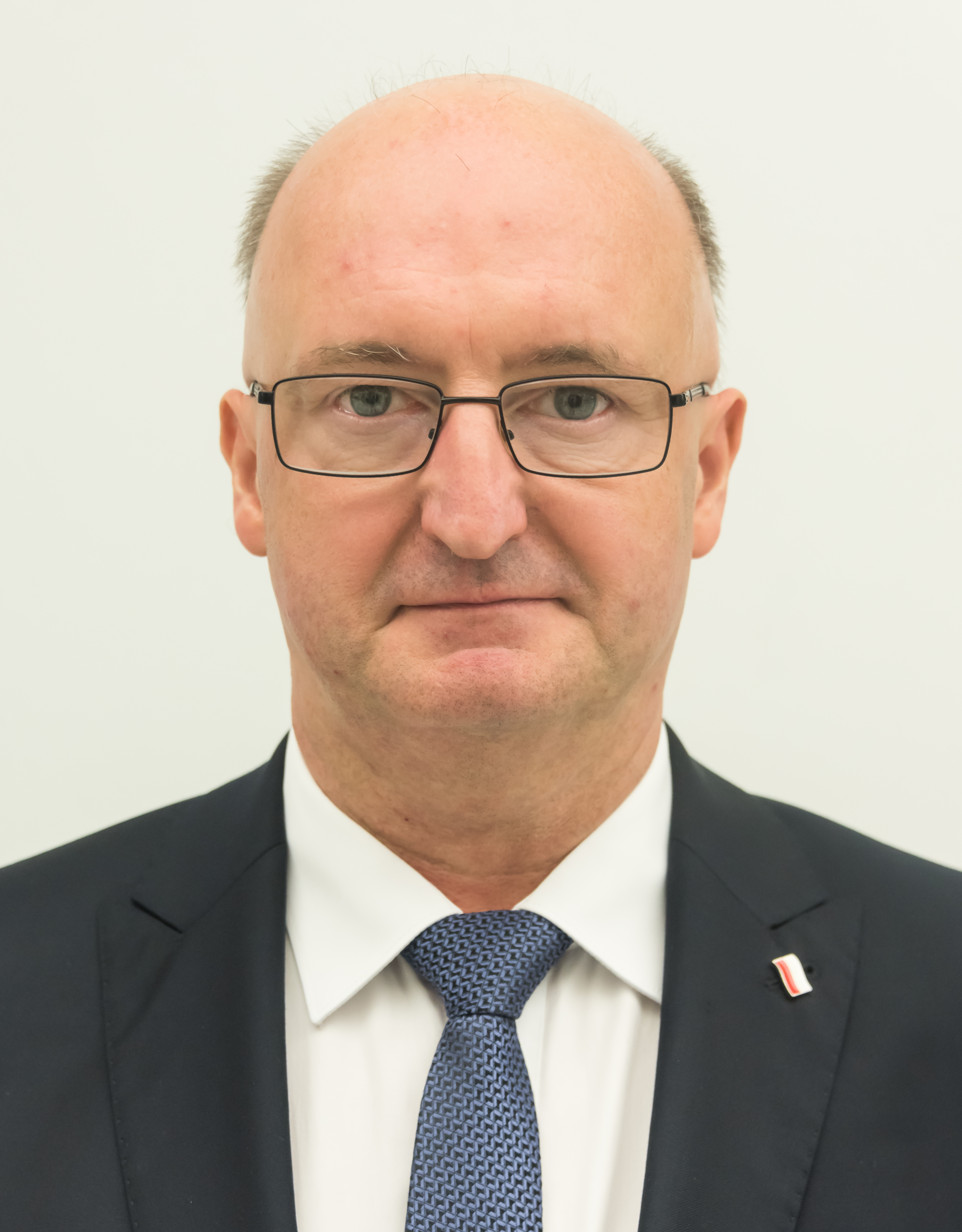
- Wawrzyk in 2022

Deputy Minister of Foreign Affairs
- In office 21 January 2021 – 31 August 2023

Deputy of the IX Sejm
- In office 2019 – 2023
- Constituency: 33 Kielce

Personal details
- Born: Piotr Sylwester Wawrzyk; 31 December 1967 (age 58) Kielce, Polish People's Republic
- Party: Law and Justice
- Other political affiliations: Polish People's Party

Piotr Sylwester Wawrzyk (born 31 December 1967) is a Polish government official. He was the Deputy Foreign Minister until 31 August 2023 when he and seven others were removed from office for accepting bribes in return for issuing official visas.

== Biography ==
Wawrzyk graduated in international relations and law from the University of Warsaw. In 2006, he became a doctor of humanities based on his thesis titled Polityka wewnętrzna Unii Europejskiej (Internal Policy of the European Union) from the Pułtusk Academy of Humanities.

=== Political activities ===
Wawrzyk was in the Polish People's Party for several years. On 2 February 2018, he became Undersecretary of State at the Ministry of Foreign Affairs, responsible for parliamentary, legal, treaty, consular, United Nations and human rights matters. In the 2019 Polish parliamentary elections, he was elected as an MP of the 9th term from the Law and Justice Party list in the Kielce district, receiving 6,570 votes. He then resigned from his position at the Ministry of Foreign Affairs. On 27 November 2019, he returned to the Ministry of Foreign Affairs as Secretary of State. He was entrusted with matters related to Poland's membership in the EU, legal, legal and treaty matters, matters relating to the United Nations, as well as consular and parliamentary matters.

In December 2020, he became a candidate for the position of Ombudsman on the recommendation of Law and Justice. On 21 January 2021, his candidacy was accepted by the Sejm (233 MPs for, 219 against, 1 abstained), but the Senate rejected his candidacy (51 against, 48 for, 1 abstained). In March 2021, he joined Law and Justice.

Visa scandal

On 31 August 2023, Prime Minister Mateusz Morawiecki dismissed him from the position of Deputy Minister of Foreign Affairs. The official reason for his dismissal was "lack of satisfactory cooperation", although media outlets say that it was because of the Polish cash-for-visa scandal. On 14 September 2023, he was reportedly hospitalized in a critical condition after what is believed to be a suicide attempt. The suicide note left mentioned the scandal. On 17 January 2024, the Central Anticorruption Bureau announced that an individual, named only as "Piotr W." in accordance with Polish privacy law, had been arrested on corruption charges relating to the scandal; a statement issued by Wawrzyk later confirmed that he had been the subject of the arrest.

== See also ==
- Polish cash-for-visa scandal
