= Sejm Constituency no. 17 =

Polish parliamentary constituency

Coordinates: 51°24′00″N 21°10′00″E

Radom
- Polish: Okręg wyborczy Radom
- Constituency for the National Assembly of the Republic of Poland
- Boundary of the Radom Constituency in Poland for the 2011 general election.
- Counties in Masovian Voivodeship: Białobrzegi, Grójec, Kozienice, Lipsko, Przysucha, Radom, Szydłowiec, and Zwoleń
- City Counties in Masovian Voivodeship: Radom

Current constituency
- Sejm Deputies: 9
- Sejm District: 17
- European Parliament constituency: Masovian
- Voivodeship sejmik: Masovian Regional Assembly

Radom is a Polish parliamentary constituency in the Masovian Voivodeship. It elects nine members of the Sejm.

The district has the number '17' for elections to the Sejm and is named after the city of Radom. It includes the counties of Białobrzegi, Grójec, Kozienice, Lipsko, Przysucha, Radom, Szydłowiec, and Zwoleń, and the city county of Radom.

== List of members ==
=== 2019-2023 ===
Member	Party
Dariusz Bąk	Law and Justice
Radosław Fogiel	Law and Justice
Konrad Frysztak	Civic Coalition
Agnieszka Górska	Law and Justice
Joanna Kluzik-Rostkowska	Civic Coalition
Andrzej Kosztowniak	Law and Justice
Anna Kwiecień	Law and Justice
Mirosław Maliszewski	Polish People's Party
Marek Suski	Law and Justice
