= Michał Cieślak (politician) =

Polish politician (born 1974)

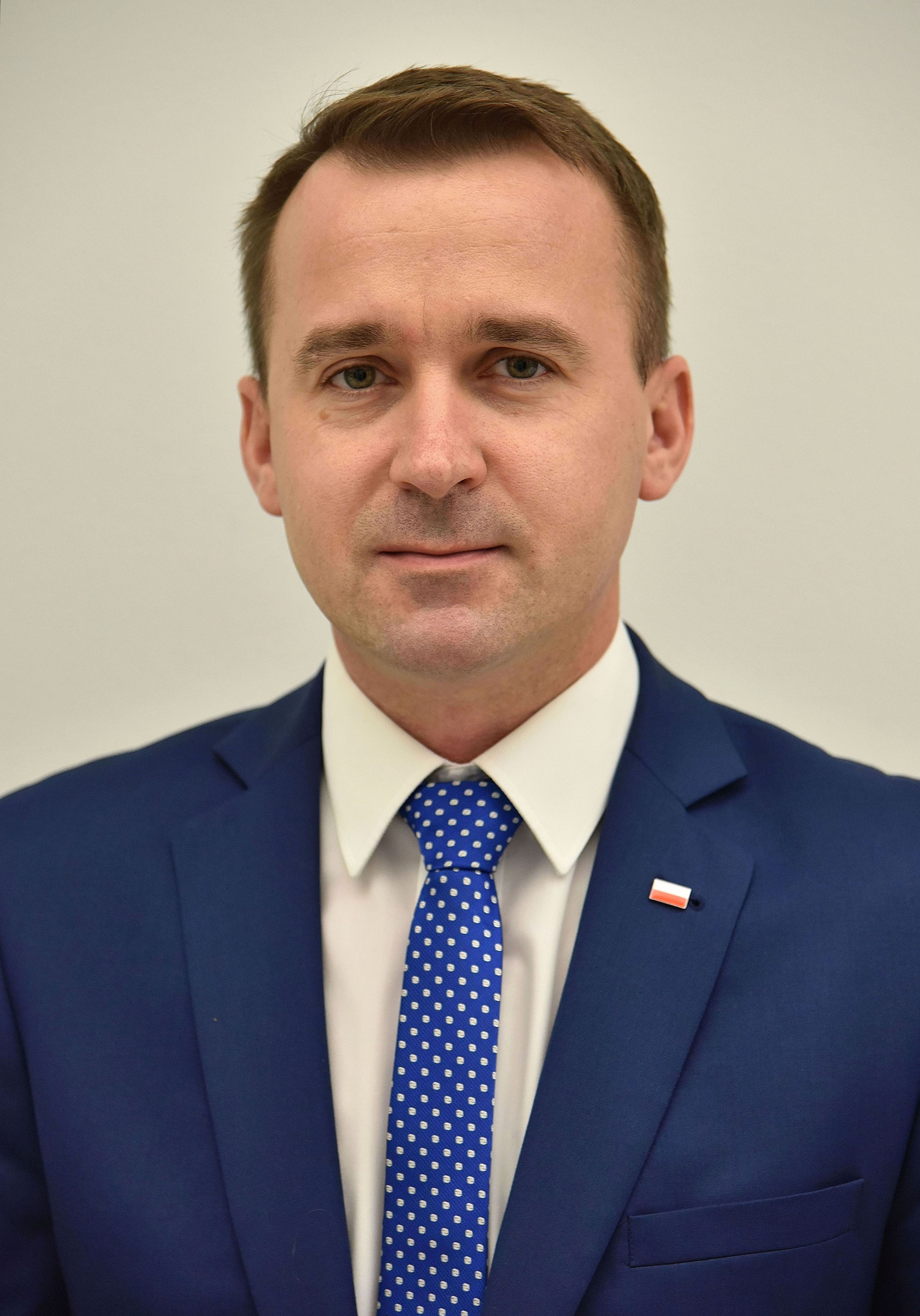
Michał Cieślak

Michał Cieślak (born 9 December 1974 in Dąbrowa Tarnowska) is a Polish politician who is a member of the VIII and IX Sejm. He is a member of Agreement. He represents the Nr. 33 (Kielce) constituency.

Since 6 October 2020 he is a Minister without portfolio responsible for Local Government Affairs.
