= Andrzej Szlachta =

Polish politician (born 1947)

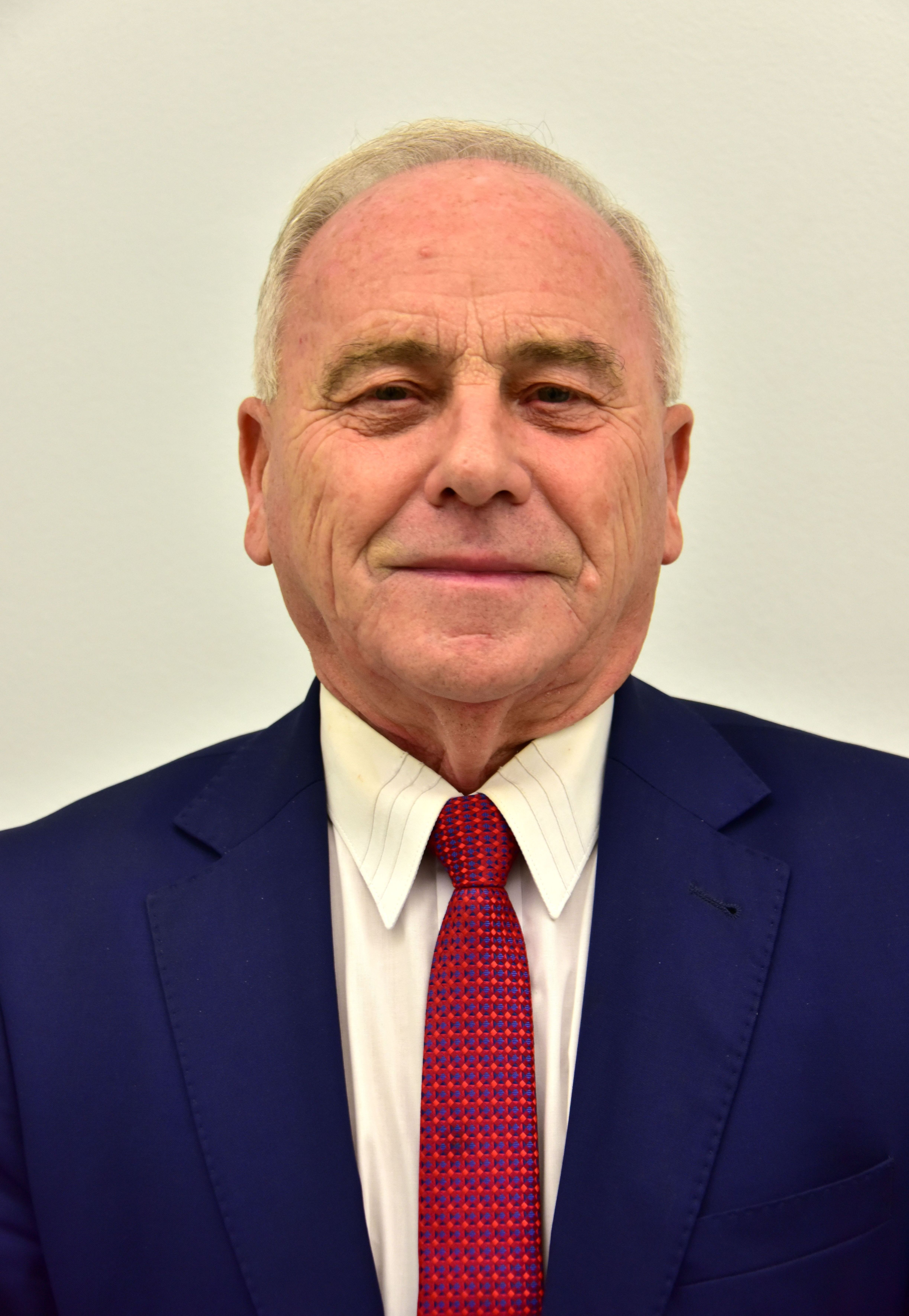

member of Sejm 2005-2007
- Incumbent
- Assumed office 25 September 2005

Personal details
- Born: 19 January 1947 (age 79) Rzeszów
- Party: Law and Justice

Andrzej Szlachta (born 19 January 1947) is a Polish politician. He was elected to the Sejm on 25 September 2005, getting 13,824 votes in 23 Rzeszów district as a candidate from the Law and Justice list.

== See also ==
- Members of Polish Sejm 2005-2007
