= Anna Kwiecień =

Polish politician (born 1964)

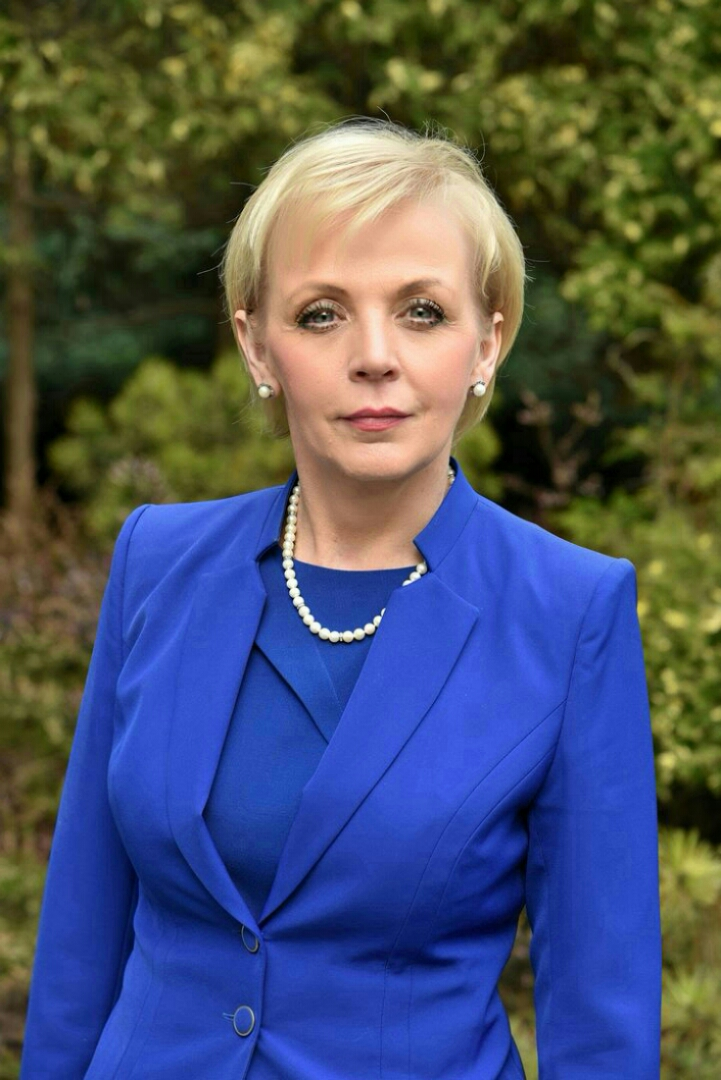

Member of the Sejm

Personal details
- Born: 30 September 1964 (age 61)

Anna Kwiecień (born 30 September 1964) is a Polish politician. She was elected to the Sejm (9th term) representing the constituency of Radom. She previously also served in the 8th term of the Sejm (2015–2019).
