= Michał Urbaniak (politician) =

Polish politician

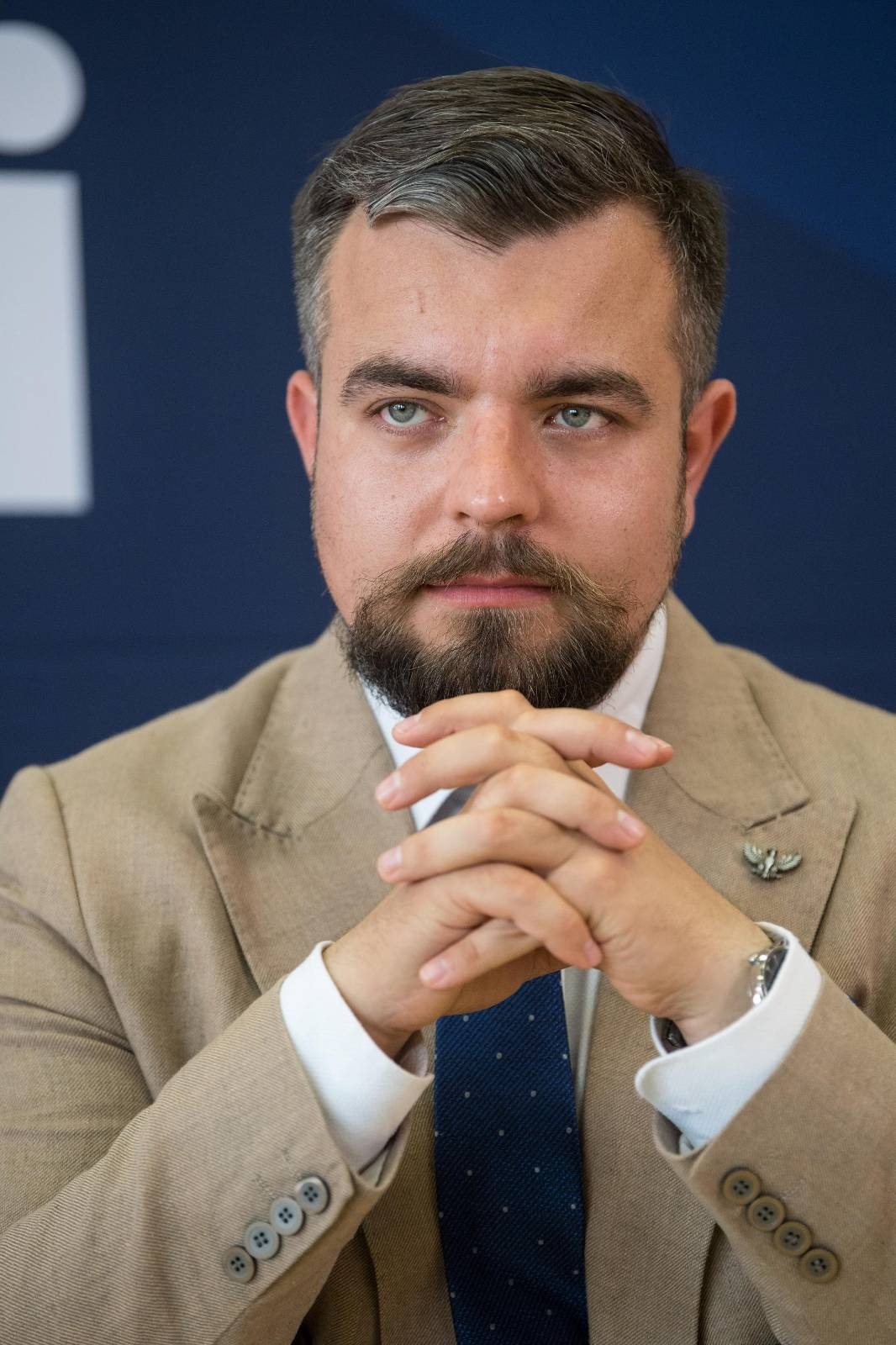
- Urbaniak in 2022
- Born: November 24, 1990 (age 35); Gdynia
- Education: Polish Naval Academy
- Occupations: Politician, entrepreneur
- Political party: National Movement, Confederation Liberty and Independence

Michał Piotr Urbaniak (born November 24, 1990, in Gdynia) is a Polish politician and entrepreneur, Member of the Sejm IX term.

== Biography ==
He graduated with a bachelor's degree in national security from the Polish Naval Academy, and also completed postgraduate studies in project management at the Eugeniusz Kwiatkowski University of Administration and Business in Gdynia and in agriculture at the International School of Agribusiness in Łomża. He became an entrepreneur and IT industry analyst.

In 2009, he joined All-Polish Youth. In 2014, he became a member of the National Movement, within which he assumed the position of president of the Pomeranian district. Unsuccessfully, he ran for the position of councilor of the Pomeranian regional council in the local elections in 2014 and 2018 from the National Movement's list, as well as for the position of Member of the European Parliament in the 2019 elections from the list of the Confederation of KORWiN Braun Liroy Nationalists.

In the 2019 national elections, he won a seat in the Sejm IX term. He ran as a candidate from the Confederation Liberty and Independence in the constituency No. 25 and received 14,918 votes. He was elected as one of the 20 secretaries of the lower chamber of the parliament. In the 2023 elections, he did not win reelection to the parliament.

In 2024, he ran for the position of Mayor of Gdańsk as a candidate of the electoral committee formed by the Confederation and the party There Is Only One Poland. He lost in the first round of voting with a result of 4.33% of the votes.
