= Agnieszka Górska =

Polish politician (born 1976)

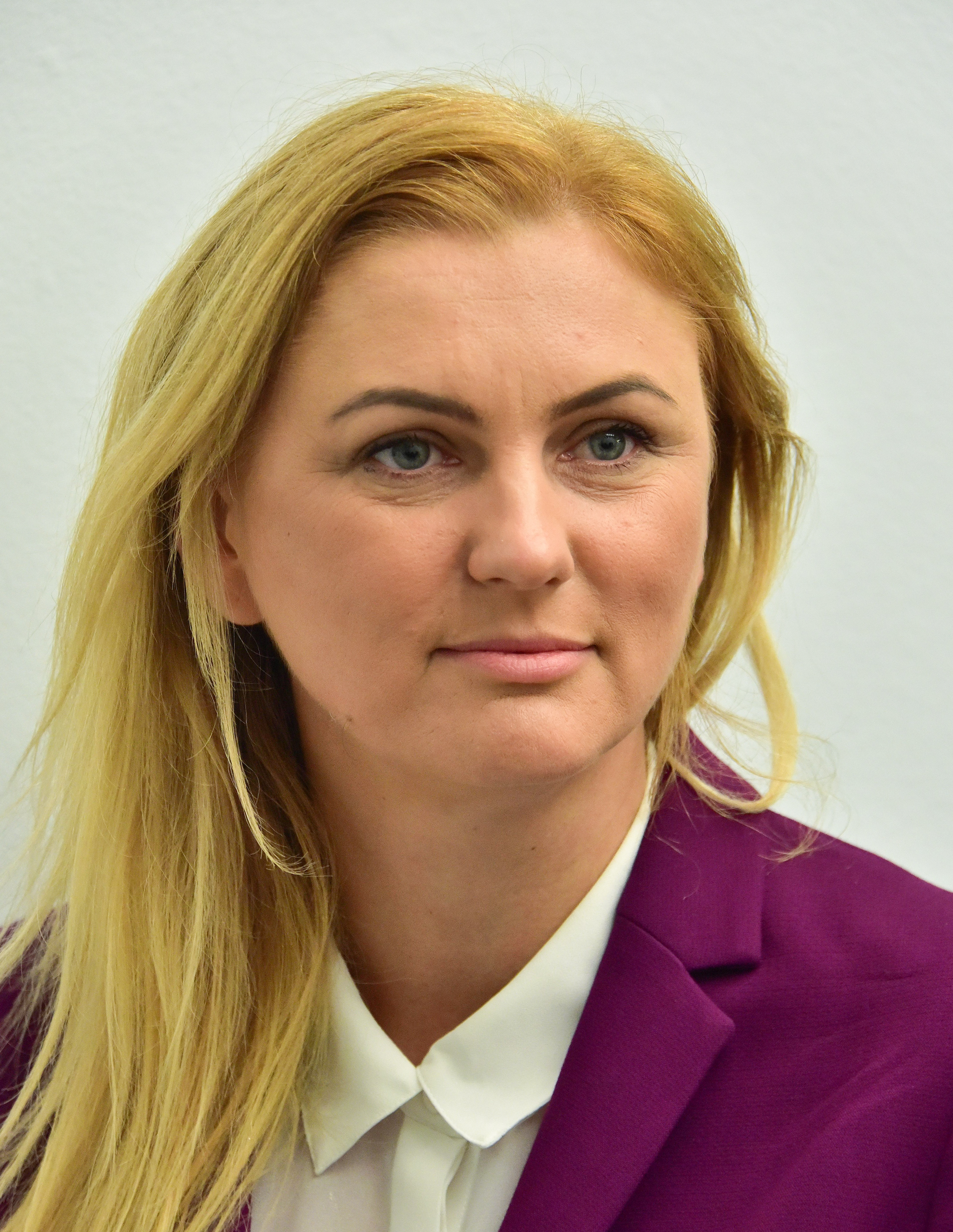

Member of the Sejm

Personal details
- Born: 1 January 1976 (age 50)

Agnieszka Beata Górska (born 1 January 1976) is a Polish politician. She was elected to the Sejm (9th term) representing the constituency of Radom.
