= Przemysław Koperski =

Polish politician (born 1974)

Przemysław Adam Koperski
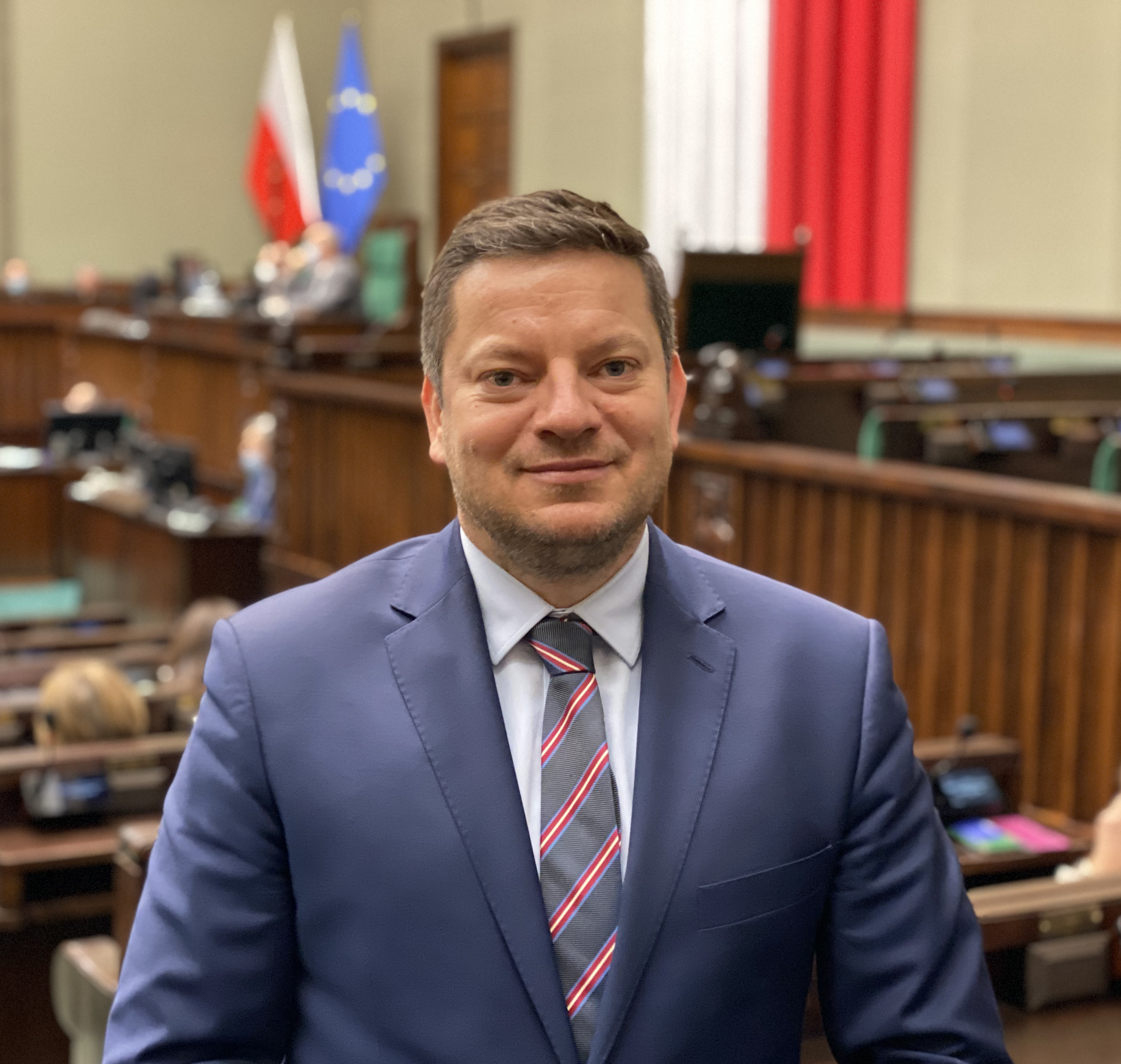
- In office 12 November 2019 – 12 November 2023

Member of the Sejm

Personal details
- Born: 22 November 1974 (age 51) Opole, Poland
- Party: New Left

Przemysław Koperski (born 22 November 1974) is a Polish politician and lawyer. Former deputy mayor of Częstochowa (2010–2014).

== Electoral history ==
Sejm
Election	Party	Votes	%	Constituency	Elected?
2007	Left and Democrats	4,670	1.35	Bielsko-Biała	No
2015	United Left	8,752	2.59	Bielsko-Biała	No
2019	Democratic Left Alliance	22,055	5.67	Bialsko-Biała	Yes
2023	The Left	12,981	2.91	Bialsko-Biała	No
