= Stanisław Żmijan =

Polish politician

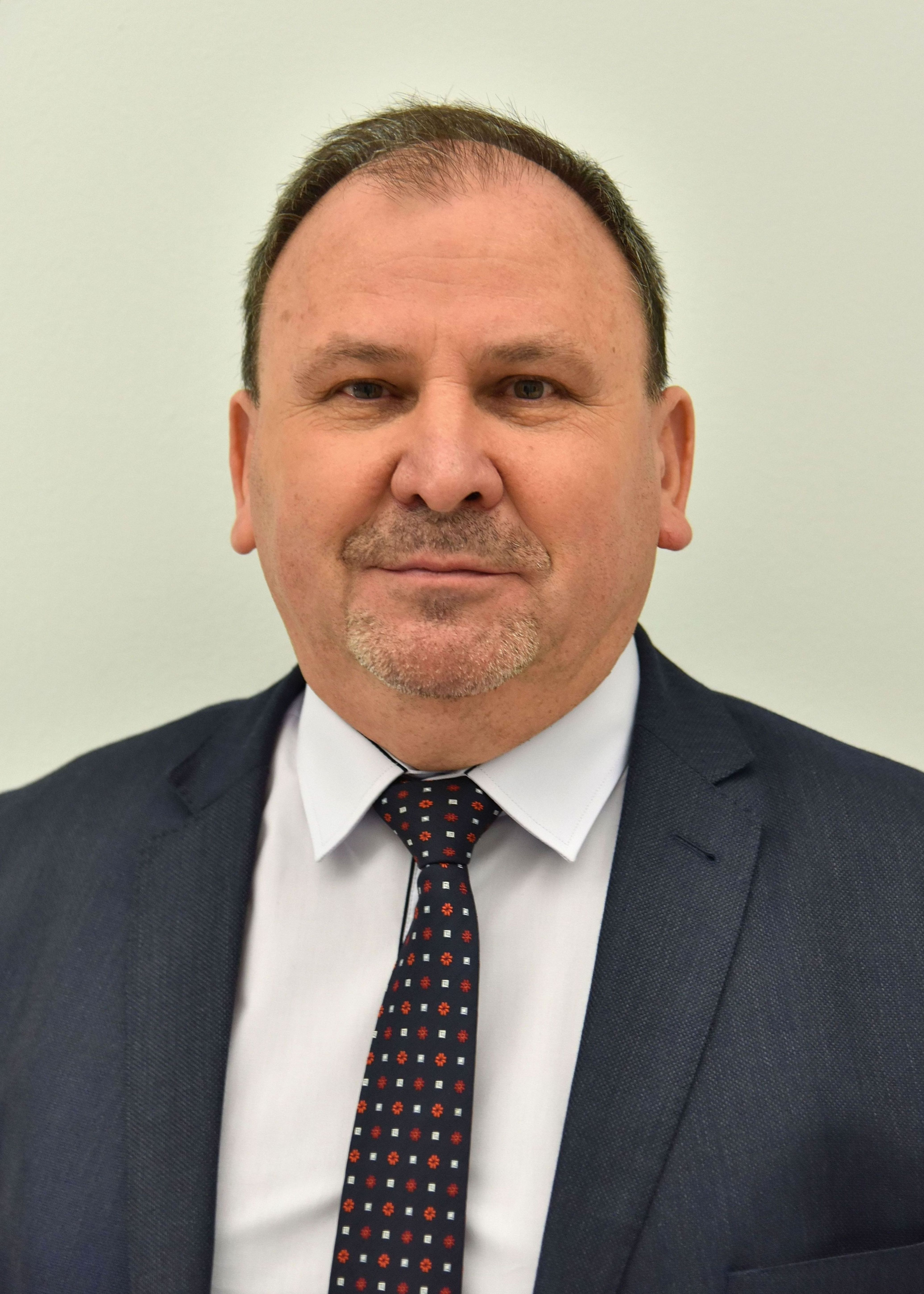

Member of Sejm
- In office 2001–2019

Personal details
- Born: 1956 (age 69–70) Tarnogród
- Party: Civic Platform

Stanisław Żmijan (born 13 December 1956) is a Polish politician. He was elected to the Sejm on 25 September 2005, getting 7708 votes in 7 Chełm district as a candidate from the Civic Platform list.

He was a member of the Sejm from 2001 to 2019. In 2021, he was named head of the Civic Platform in Lublin Voivodeship.
