= Andrzej Szejna =

Polish politician (born 1973)

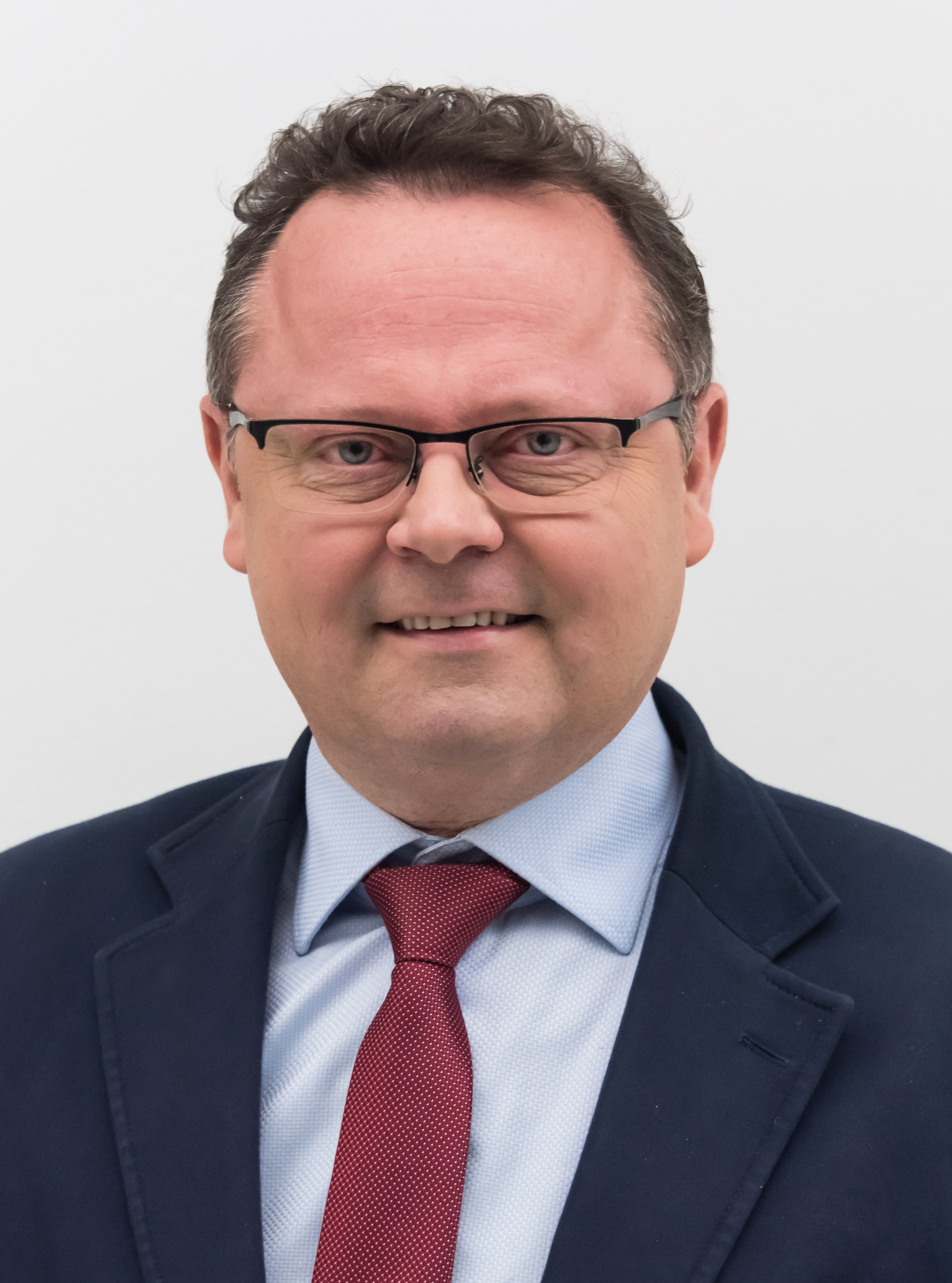

Deputy Minister of Foreign Affairs
- In office 13 December 2023 – 31 July 2025 Serving with Władysław Teofil Bartoszewski
- Prime Minister: Donald Tusk
- Minister: Radosław Sikorski

Member of the Sejm
- Incumbent
- Assumed office 12 November 2019
- Constituency: 33-Kielce

Member of the European Parliament
- In office 20 July 2004 – 14 July 2009

Personal details
- Born: Andrzej Jan Szejna; April 28, 1973 (age 52) Końskie, Poland
- Party: Democratic Left Alliance (until 2021); New Left (since 2021)

Andrzej Jan Szejna (pronounced [ˈandʐɛj jan ˈʂɛjna]; born 28 April 1973, in Końskie) is a Polish politician and Member of the European Parliament (MEP) for the Lesser Poland Voivodeship & Świętokrzyskie Voivodeship with the Democratic Left Alliance-Labor Union, part of the Socialist Group and is vice-chair of the European Parliament's Committee on Legal Affairs.

Szejna is a substitute for the Committee on Budgets, a member of the Delegation for relations with Belarus and a substitute for the Delegation for relations with the Korean Peninsula, Taiwan and the Philippines.

== Education ==
- 1999: Master of Economics at the Warsaw School of Economics (1998) and Masters of Law University of Warsaw

== Career ==
- since 2001: Articled clerk at the Regional Chamber of Legal Counsellors in Warsaw
- since 2001: Lecturer (since 1999), Vice-Dean of the Department of International Relations at the University of Insurance and Banking (WSUiB)
- since 2014: Teacher of law at the Academy of Finances and Business Vistula in Warsaw
- 2001-2003: Advisor to the Secretary of State at the Ministry of Finance
- 2003-2004: Under-secretary of State at the Ministries of Economy, and Labour and Social Policy, then Vice-Chairman of PAIiZ S.A.(Państwowa Agencja Informacji i Inwestycji Zagranicznych, Spółka Akcyjna), responsible for overseas investments and the promotion of exports, subsequently Deputy minister for European Affairs at the Office of the Committee on European Integration
- 2002-2003: Secretary of the Team on European Integration of the National Council of the Democratic Left Alliance (SLD) (2000-2002), member of the National Executive Committee (SLD)
- since 2002: National plenipotentiary of the Coalition Election Committee of the SLD-UP
- Member of the National Council of the SLD (2003)
- 1997-1999: President of the Students' Parliament of the Republic of Poland
- 1997-1999: Officer of the Chief Council of Higher Education of the Republic of Poland

== See also ==
- 2004 European Parliament election in Poland
