= Krzysztof Lipiec =

Polish politician (born 1959)

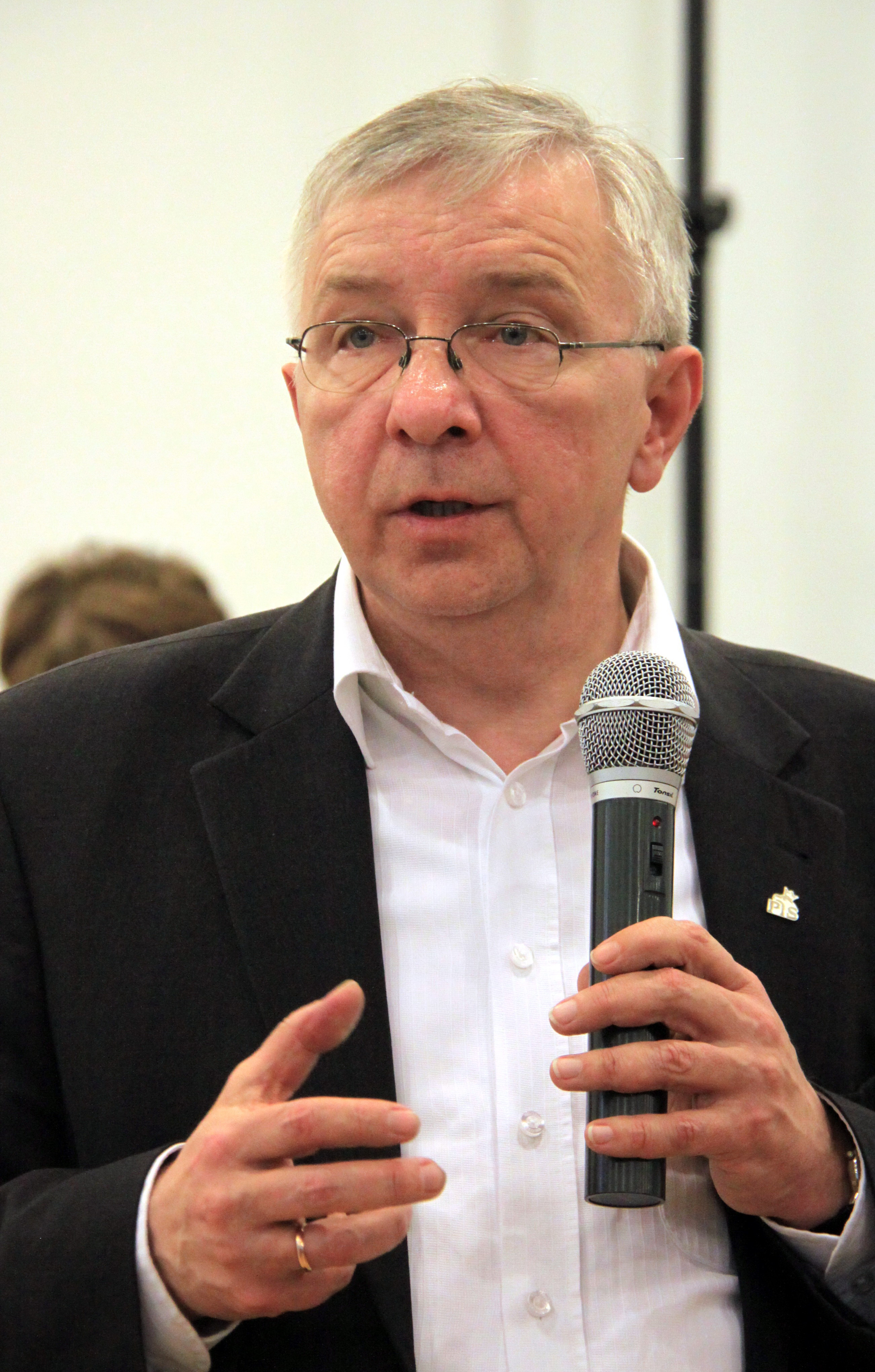

Member of the Sejm
- Incumbent
- Assumed office 25 September 2005
- Constituency: 33 – Kielce

Personal details
- Born: 11 October 1959 (age 66)
- Party: Law and Justice

Krzysztof Bogdan Lipiec (born 11 October 1959 in Starachowice) is a Polish politician. He was elected to the Sejm on 25 September 2005, getting 4697 votes in 33 Kielce district as a candidate from Law and Justice list.

He was also a member of Senate of Poland from 1997 to 2001.

== See also ==
- Members of Polish Sejm 2005-2007
