= Konrad Frysztak =

Polish politician (born 1986)

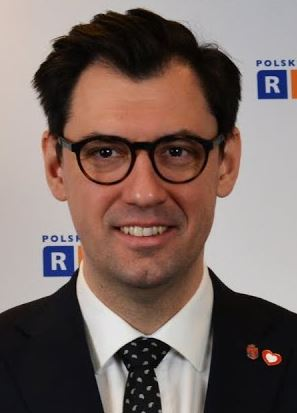

Member of the Sejm
- Incumbent
- Assumed office 12 November 2019
- Constituency: Radom

Personal details
- Born: 15 February 1986 (age 40)
- Party: Civic Platform

Konrad Frysztak (born 15 February 1986) is a Polish politician serving as a member of the Sejm since 2019. From 2014 to 2019, he served as deputy mayor of Radom. He has been a substitute member of the Parliamentary Assembly of the Council of Europe since 2024.
