= Leonard Krasulski =

Polish politician (born 1950)

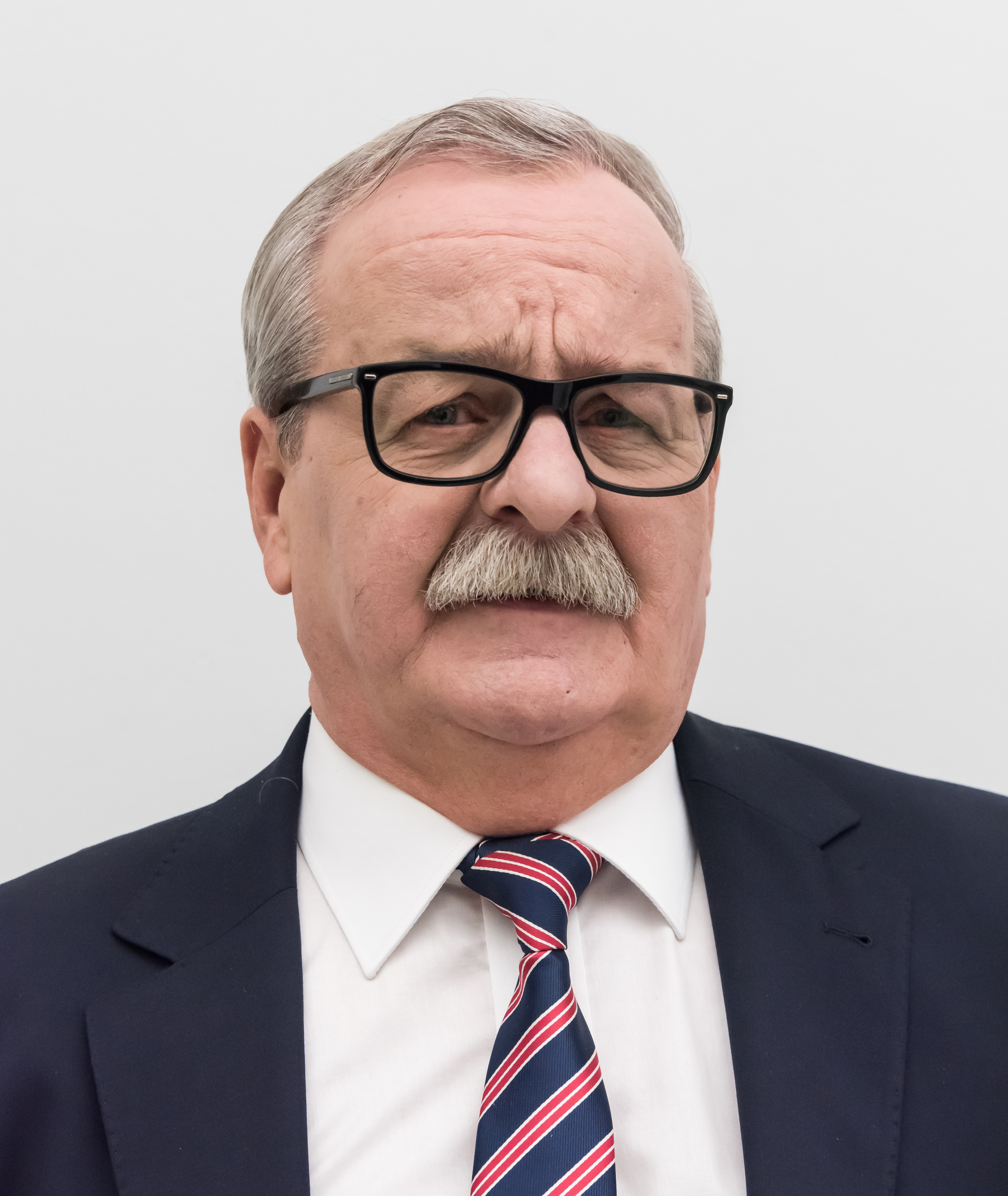

Member of the Sejm
- Incumbent
- Assumed office 25 September 2005
- Constituency: 34 – Elbląg

Personal details
- Born: 8 November 1950 (age 75)
- Party: Law and Justice

Leonard Seweryn Krasulski (born 8 November 1950 in Sopot) is a Polish politician. He was elected to the Sejm on 25 September 2005, getting 7777 votes in 34 Elbląg district as a candidate from the Law and Justice list.

== Biography ==
Active in the anti-communist opposition, he was arrested in 1982 and pardoned a year later.

== See also ==
- Members of Polish Sejm 2005-2007
