= Wiesław Buż =

Polish politician (born 1957)

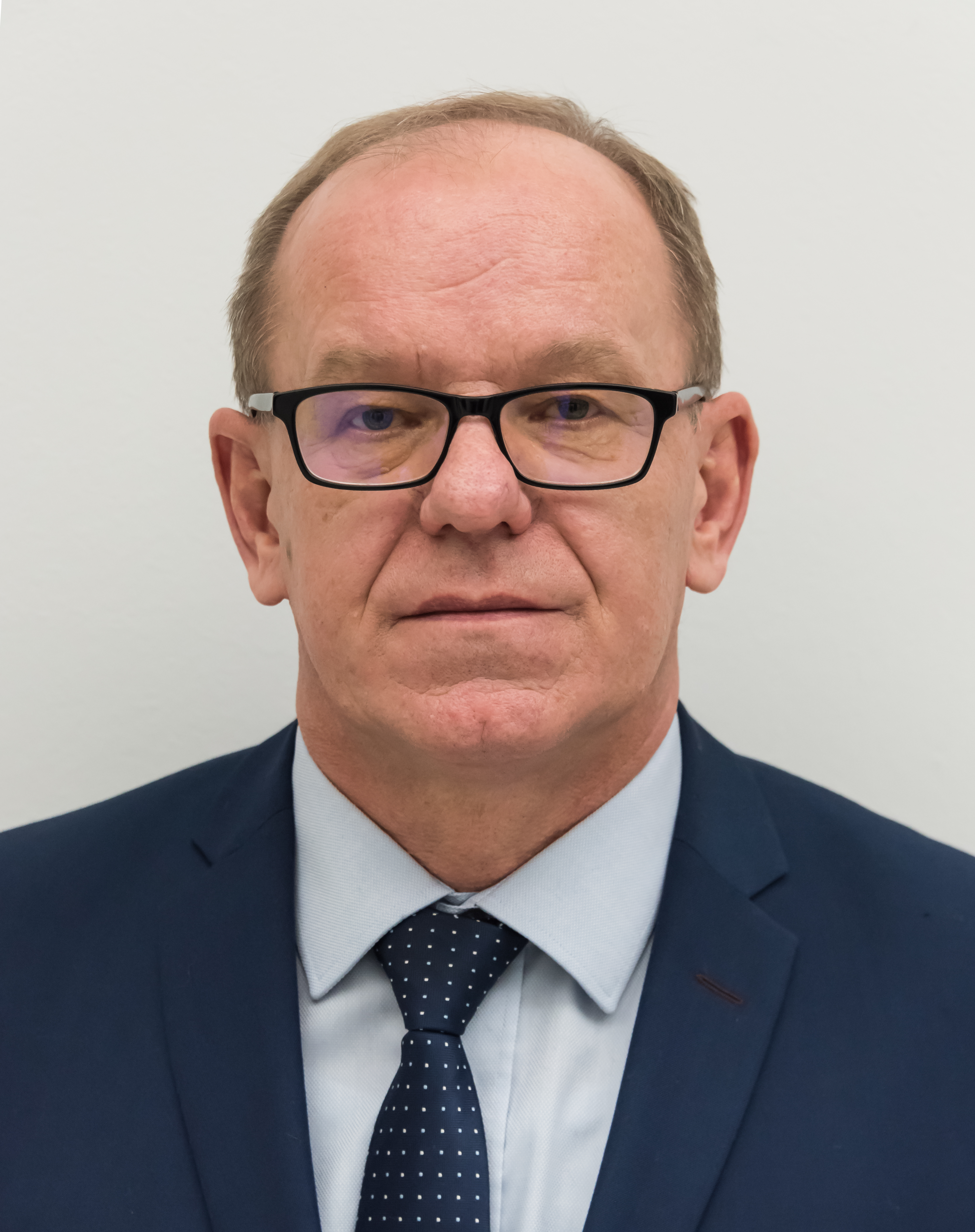
- In office 12 November 2019 – 12 November 2023

Member of the Sejm

Personal details
- Born: 27 September 1957 (age 68) Rzeszów, Poland
- Party: New Left

Wiesław Buż (born 27 September 1957) is a Polish politician and sociologist. Member of the Sejm representing Democratic Left Alliance (SLD) and the New Left (after SLD merged with Spring into a new party in 2021).

== Electoral history ==
Sejm
Election	Party	Votes	%	Constituency	Elected?
2005	Social Democracy of Poland	536	0.13	Rzeszów	No
2007	Left and Democrats	703	0.14	Rzeszów	No
2015	United Left	1,820	0.36	Rzeszów	No
2019	Democratic Left Alliance	15,605	2.65	Rzeszów	Yes
2023	New Left	8,844	1.31	Rzeszów	No
