= Agata Wojtyszek =

Polish politician

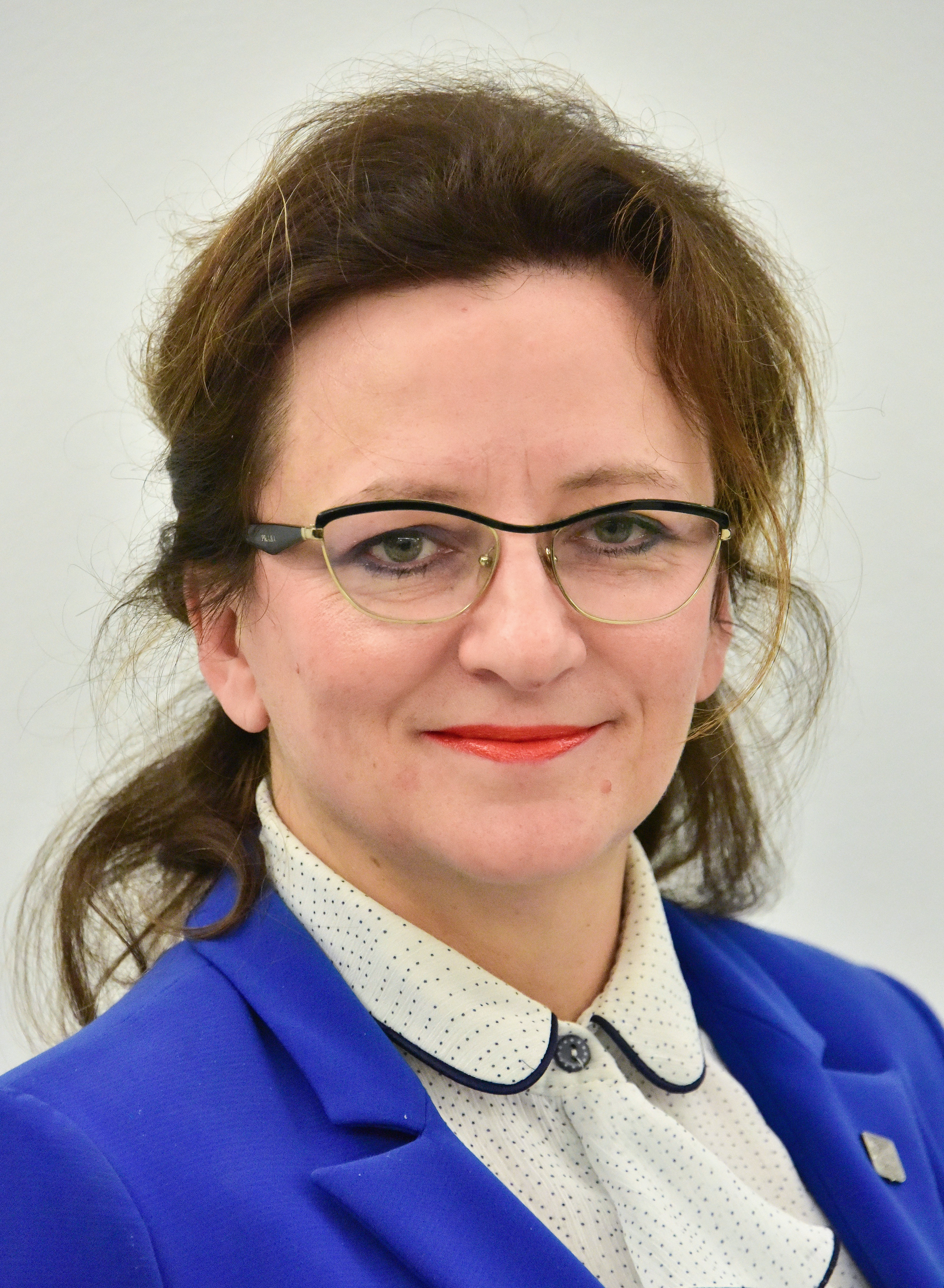

Member of the Sejm

Personal details
- Born: 23 October 1967 (age 58)

Agata Katarzyna Wojtyszek (born 23 October 1967) is a Polish politician. She was elected to the Sejm (9th and 10th term) representing the constituency of Kielce.
