= University of Economics and Innovation =

Private higher education institution in Lublin, Poland

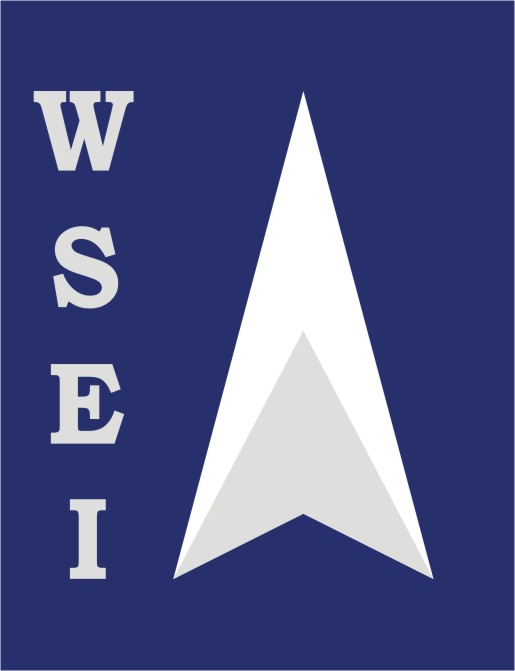
- Type: Private
- Established: 2000
- Affiliations: SOCRATES/ERASMUS, ECTS,
- Endowment: 8,281 (12.2023)
- Chancellor: Teresa Bogacka
- Rector: prof. dr hab. Marek Żmigrodzki
- Students: 200
- Location: 4 Projektowa St., Lublin, 20-209, Lublin, Poland
- Colours: Blue Silver
- Website: www.wsei.lublin.pl

The University of Economics and Innovation (also called: 'Higher School of Economics and Innovation of Lublin' in Polish: 'Wyższa Szkoła Ekonomii i Innowacji w Lublinie', commonly shortened to WSEI) was founded on October 24, 2000 in Lublin. Its name unveils the mission of the school: regional development and improvement of regional socio-economic situation.

Currently the number of students is almost 12,000. To meet the growing demand for higher education and rapid growth of the number of students, the college has recently invested in expansion and buildings.

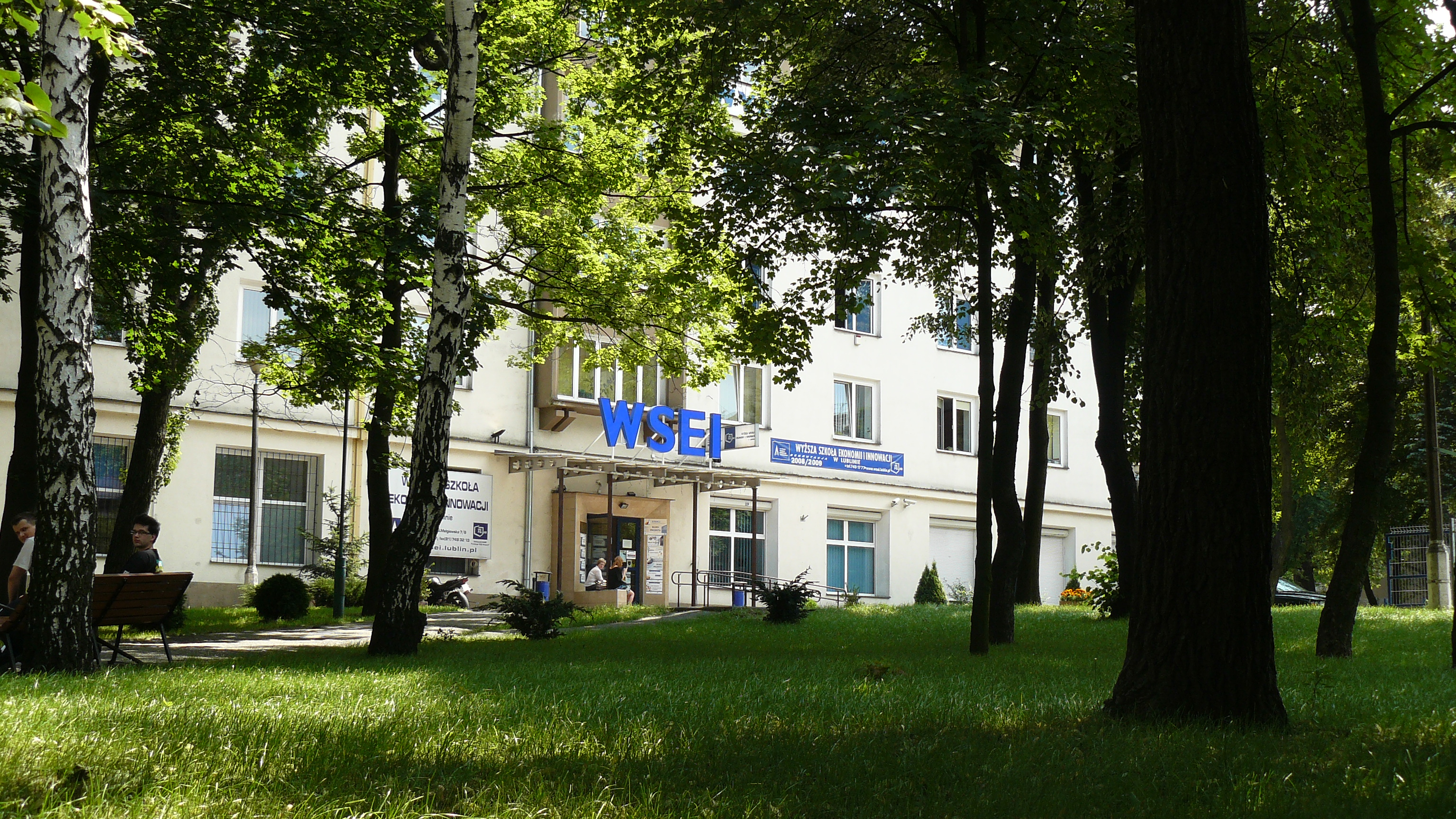
Main entrance to WSEI

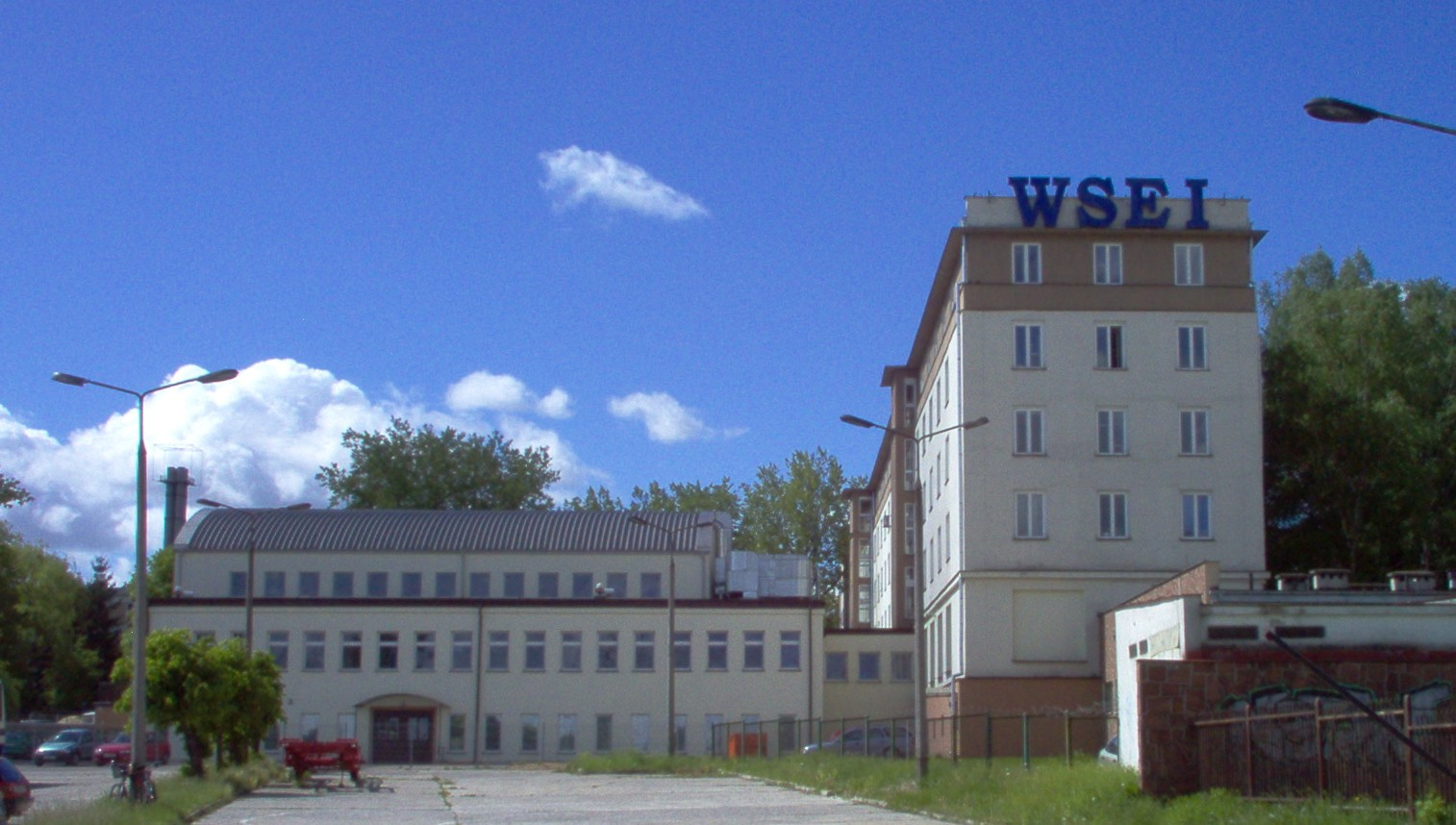
The main building of Higher School of Economics and Innovation as viewed from Mełgiewska St.

== Faculties ==
- Economics
- Computer Science
- Logistic
- Nursing
- Management

Majority of faculties and its specialisations are able under undergraduate, postgraduate and lifelong learning level.

== History ==
WSEI is a public school (in UK meaning) of tertiary education, established by Polish Foundation of Economic Development Succouring Centres "OIC Poland", with permission of Polish Ministry of Education. Inscribed into the Polish Higher Schools Registry on the position 57. WSEI is non-commercial college, the main assumption which ensue from memorandum purposes of the establishing foundation "OIC Poland" is preparing well-educated cadre for local corporations, local community institutions and non-governmental organisations, and for accelerating regions which are still delayed in socio-economic area.

== Building ==
Lectures mainly take place in the headquarters at 4 Projektowa St., which WSEI bought from Daewoo Motor Polska sp. z o.o. in 2000 and adapted to education purposes. There are five assembly halls (auditoriums with enough room for 216, 200, 200, 200 and 300 people); there are five computer science laboratories and 35 lecture rooms.

In 2005, an elevator was built inside, to meet disabled community expectations. In 2007 a new sports hall was built; it has 310.8 m^{2} (3,345.42 sq ft) of surface.

=== Library ===
Library is located in the cellar. The number of volumes is still rapidly increasing.

== Student life ==
Lublin is the biggest academic city in the eastern half of Poland, with approximately 100,000 students, which means that about one-third of the city's population is students. There's number of universities, higher schools and colleges, and student's associations, i.e., Association of Animators and Culture Managers, or Computing Science Students Association. The college has plenty of room for much more students organisations, but it depends on students. There's an independent Students' Union in this school. The city offers number of culture events; the school's Animators and Culture Managers Association takes part in efforts to get the title of European Capital of Culture in 2016 for Lublin.

Many academic conferences, especially in the subject of economics and regional development, are organised in WSEI.

School has a sports hall and gym; students can get free tickets for municipal swimming pool, sauna, jacuzzi and in winter for ice-skating.

== Transportation ==
Headquarters of University of Economics and Innovations is at 4 Projektowa St. in Lublin.
