= Adam Ołdakowski =

Polish politician

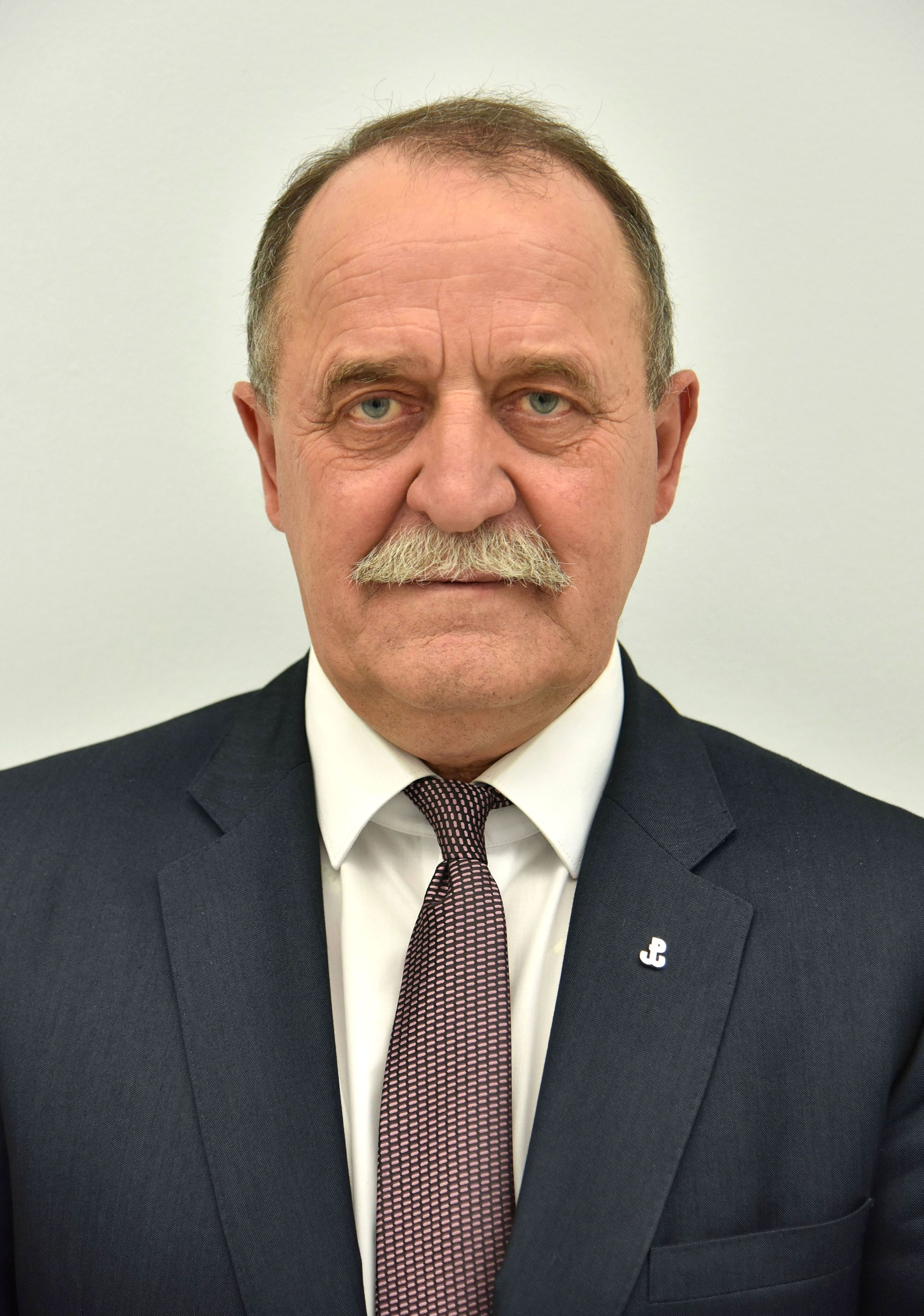

member of Sejm 2005-2007
- Incumbent
- Assumed office 25 September 2005

Personal details
- Born: 1955 (age 70–71)
- Party: Samoobrona

Adam Ołdakowski (born 25 December 1955 in Giżycko) is a Polish politician. He was elected to Sejm on 25 September 2005, getting 7488 votes in 34 Elbląg district as a candidate from the Samoobrona Rzeczpospolitej Polskiej list. He was also a member of Sejm 2001-2005.

In 2010, Adam became the representative of the European Social Support Center Helper in Olsztyn. He joined the District Employment Council in Bartoszyce. He was awarded the honour of "Meritorious for Warmia and Mazury".

== See also ==
- Members of Polish Sejm 2005-2007
