= Anna Krupka =

Polish politician (born 1981)

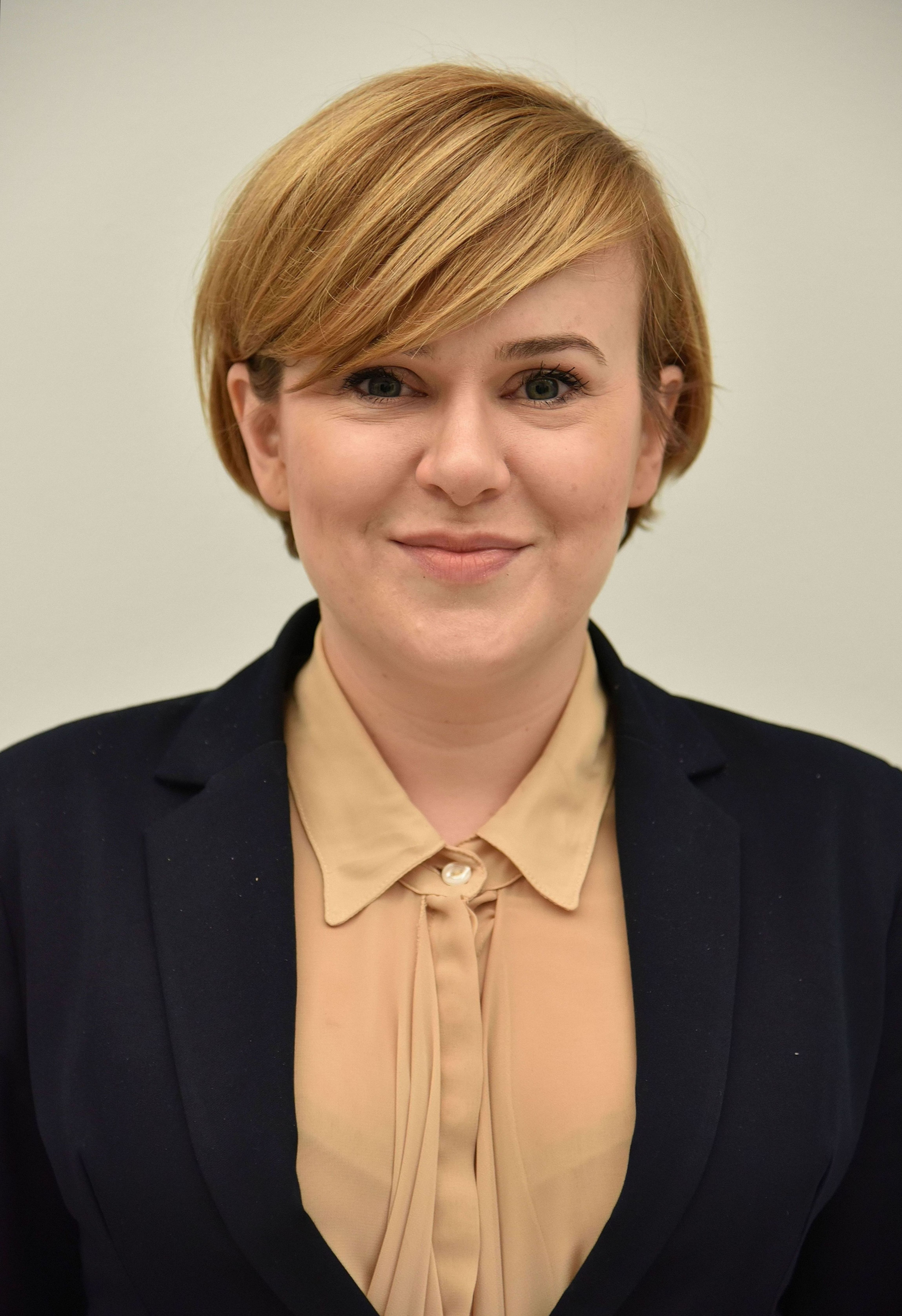
- Anna Krupka in 2016

Member of the Sejm
- Incumbent
- Assumed office 25 October 2015

Personal details
- Born: 30 October 1981 (age 44) Warsaw, Poland
- Party: Law and Justice
- Education: University of Warsaw
- Profession: Politician

Anna Maria Krupka (born 30 October 1981) is a Polish politician who is a Member of the Sejm.

== Biography ==
Krupka graduated at the Institute of Sociology of the University of Warsaw. She engaged in political activities within the framework of Law and Justice, becoming a full-time employee of the party. In 2014 Krupka was elected to the Masovian Regional Assembly. In the parliamentary elections in 2015, Krupka ran for the Sejm in the Kielce district. She was elected with 27 568 votes.

Krupka, a state secretary for sports and culture, got into a debate with Konrad Berkowicz and Dawid Lewick, both members of the far-right Confederation Liberty and Independence party. During the debate over proposed restitution for Jewish Holocaust victims and their families, Berkowicz and Lewick said Krupka and her party represented "Poland, not Polin," the latter being the country's name in Hebrew. While Krupka was speaking Lewick placed a Kippah on her head, saying that he party "kneel before the Jews, they sell the country for $300 billion."
