= Dominik Tarczyński =

Polish politician (born 1979)

Dominik Tarczyński MEP
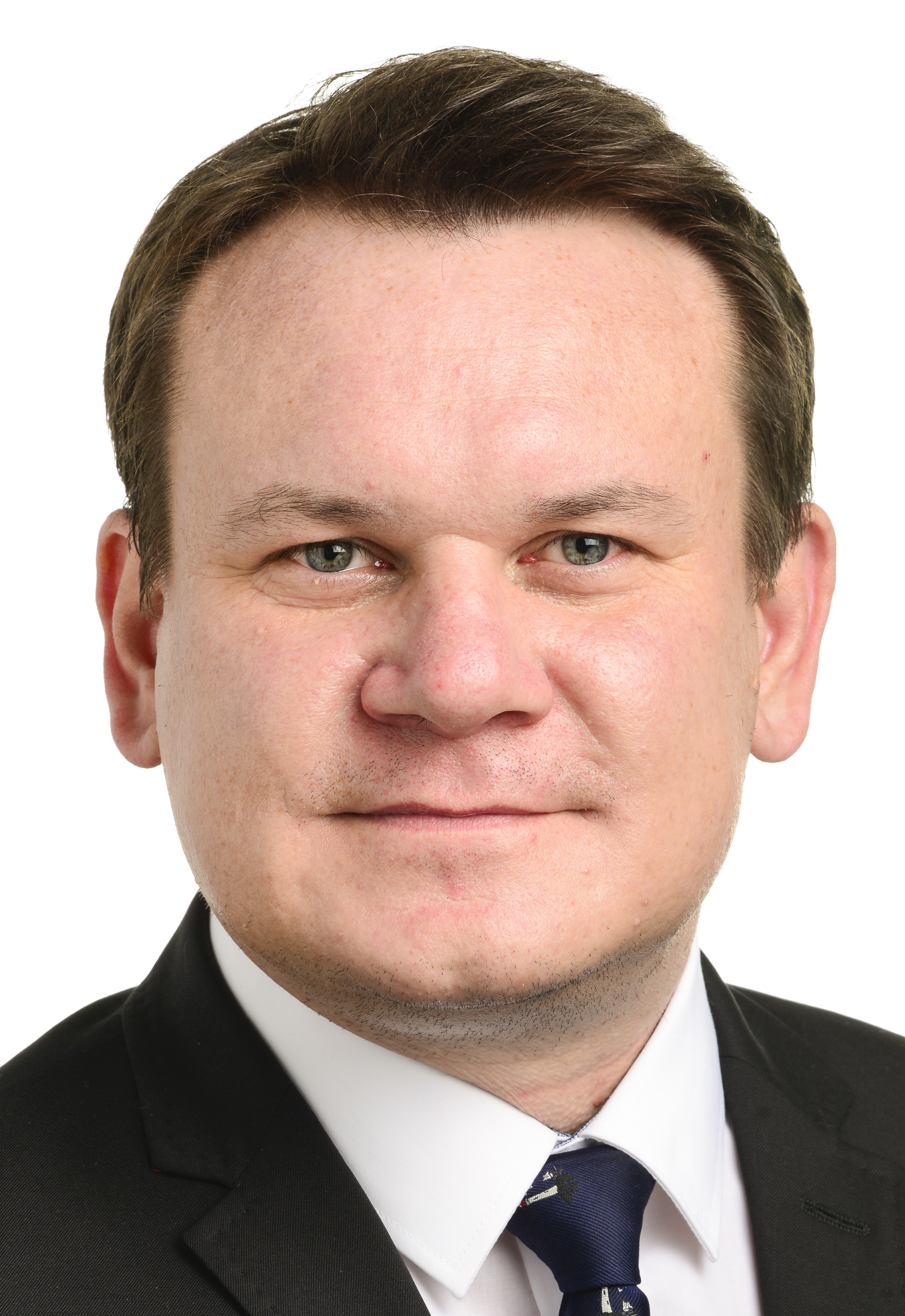
- Official portrait, 2020

Member of the European Parliament
- Incumbent
- Assumed office 1 February 2020
- Constituency: Lesser Poland and Świętokrzyskie

Member of the Sejm
- In office 2015 – 30 January 2020
- Constituency: Lublin

Personal details
- Born: 27 March 1979 (age 47) Lublin, Poland
- Party: ECR Group (EP); PiS (Sejm)
- Education: John Paul II Catholic University of Lublin: Magister, Law
- Occupation: Politician; journalist

Dominik Tarczyński (born 27 March 1979) is a Polish politician who has served as a Member of the European Parliament (MEP) since 2020 and was a member of the Sejm (MP) from 2015 to 2020.

== Early life and career ==
Tarczyński was born on 27 March 1979 in Lublin, Polish People's Republic.

In 2006, Tarczyński graduated with a magister degree in Law from the Faculty of Law and Administration at the John Paul II Catholic University of Lublin.

From 2003 to 2008, he was a community organizer at London's Westminster Cathedral, and hosted a radio broadcast of Christian music. He was a lay assistant to one of the British exorcists. From January 23, 2009, to February 1, 2010, he was the director of TVP3 Kielce; later, he was employed as the deputy director for operation in the IT and Telecommunications Centre of TVP.

He also took up journalistic activity in the pages of Gazeta Polska and created documentary films devoted to Christian topics. He directed the documentary film Colombia - Testimony to the World, with the participation of the then-president of Colombia, Álvaro Uribe, which received an award at the Sixteenth International Catholic Film and Multimedia Festival in Niepokalanów. He was the founder of the Association of Catholics Charismatics.

== Political career ==
In 2010, he unsuccessfully ran for the Świętokrzyskie Voivodeship Sejmik from the Law and Justice (PiS) list. He then organised the structures of the Poland Is Most Important Association in Kielce, but after a few weeks he left it. In 2011, he co-founded Sovereign Poland, which he left at the beginning of April 2014. In the same year, on the recommendation of the Right Wing of the Republic, he again stood for election to the regional council on the PiS list. In the parliamentary elections in 2015, he stood for the Sejm as an independent candidate from the eleventh place on the PiS list in the Kielce district. He was elected MEP for the eighth term of office, receiving 7,475 votes. After the elections, he became a member of PiS.

In the 2019 European Parliament elections, he was elected deputy of the ninth term. He received an additional mandate in the EU's Parliament, granted to Poland as part of the distribution of some of the mandates previously filled by the United Kingdom. However, due to the delay in the procedure, this mandate was suspended. In the Polish parliamentary election of the same year, he was again elected to the Sejm, receiving 8,186 votes. On February 1, 2020, after the UK's exit from the EU took effect, he gained his seat as a member of the ninth European Parliament.

In the 2024 European Parliament elections, he was again elected to European Parliament for its tenth term, receiving 210,942 votes.

== Political views ==
=== Polish history and antisemitism ===
In 2023, Tarczyński called for the criminal prosecution of Holocaust historian Barbara Engelking following comments she made about Polish attitudes toward Jews during the Holocaust. He had previously made headlines in 2019 when he told CNN that antisemitism did not exist in Poland.

=== Immigration ===
In September 2025, Tarczyński attended far-right activist Tommy Robinson's Unite the Kingdom rally in London, where he spoke from the main stage and called for a “very radical” approach to immigration, including leading a “Send them back” chant. The rally attracted an estimated 110,000 to 150,000 people, according to police estimates.

In January 2026, Tarczyński praised United States Immigration and Customs Enforcement agents after they killed Renée Good in Minneapolis, United States.

In May 2026 Tarczyński intended to travel to the United Kingdom in order to address a far-right rally being held in London. However, he had his Electronic Travel Authorisation revoked by the Home Secretary, Shabana Mahmood. In response, Tarczyński described the revocation as “what communism looks like in the 21st century” and stated on X (formerly known as Twitter) that he would personally sue the UK's Prime Minister, Keir Starmer.

Tarczyński has denied being an Islamophobe, claiming that his perspective is not a form of phobia but drawn from what he claims is a rational fear of muslims.

=== Social and religious views ===
Tarczyński is socially conservative and has emphasised Poland’s Christian identity and traditional values. In a 2020 interview with Tim Sebastian, he claimed his party was "trying to keep Poland great and Christian." In response to the apprehensions of Poland's LGBTQ community over LGBT-free zones being implemented, he has dismissed their concerns as “LGBT ideology”, while claiming that Poland remains a free country.

=== Support for Iran War ===
Tarczyński has expressed public support for the Iran War.
