= Maria Stromberger =

Austrian nurse (1898–1957)

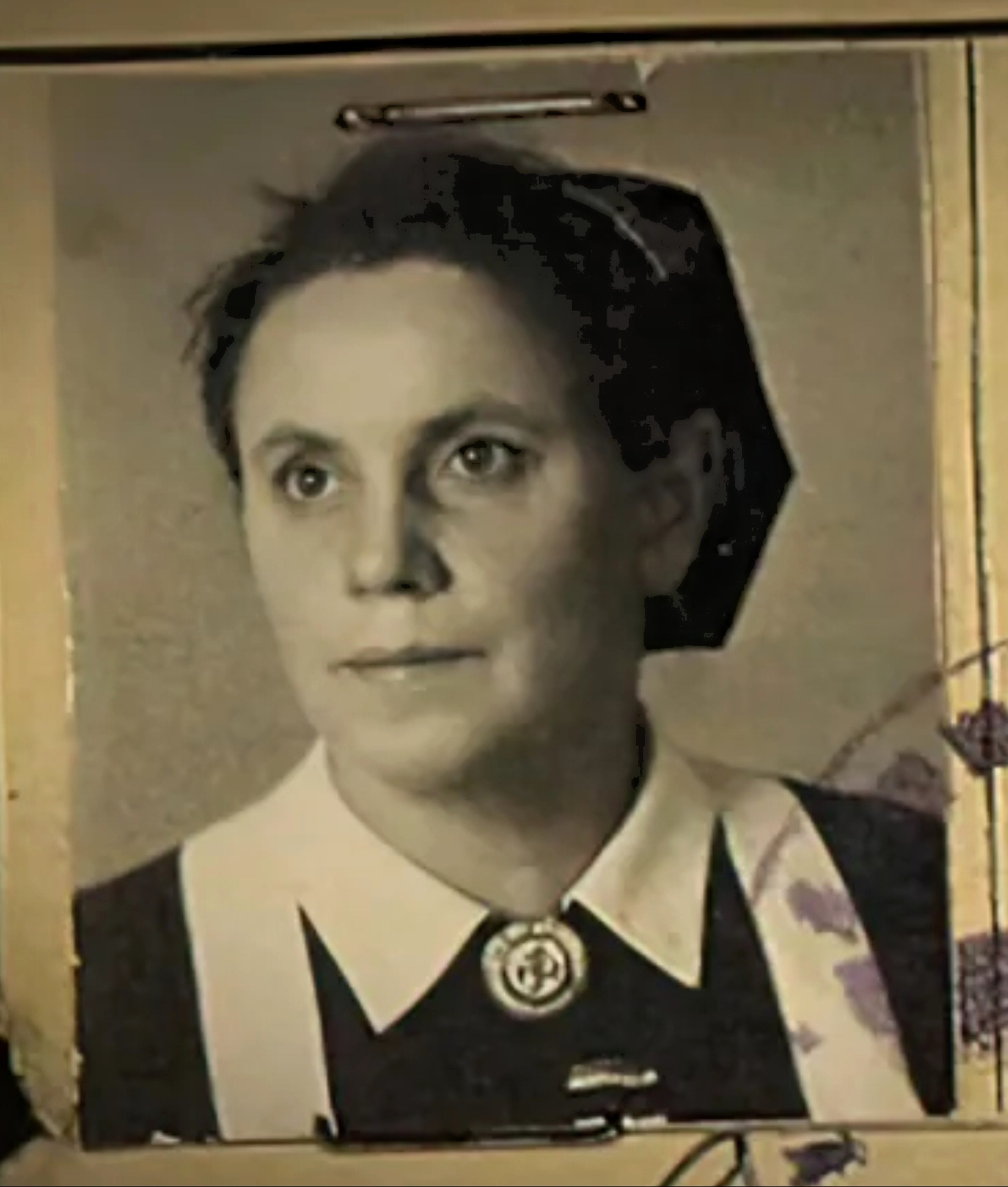
- Stromberger's photograph on her Auschwitz identity card issued in 1942
- Born: 16 March 1898; Metnitz, Austria-Hungary
- Died: 18 May 1957 (aged 59); Bregenz, Austria
- Occupations: Nurse, textile factory worker

Signature
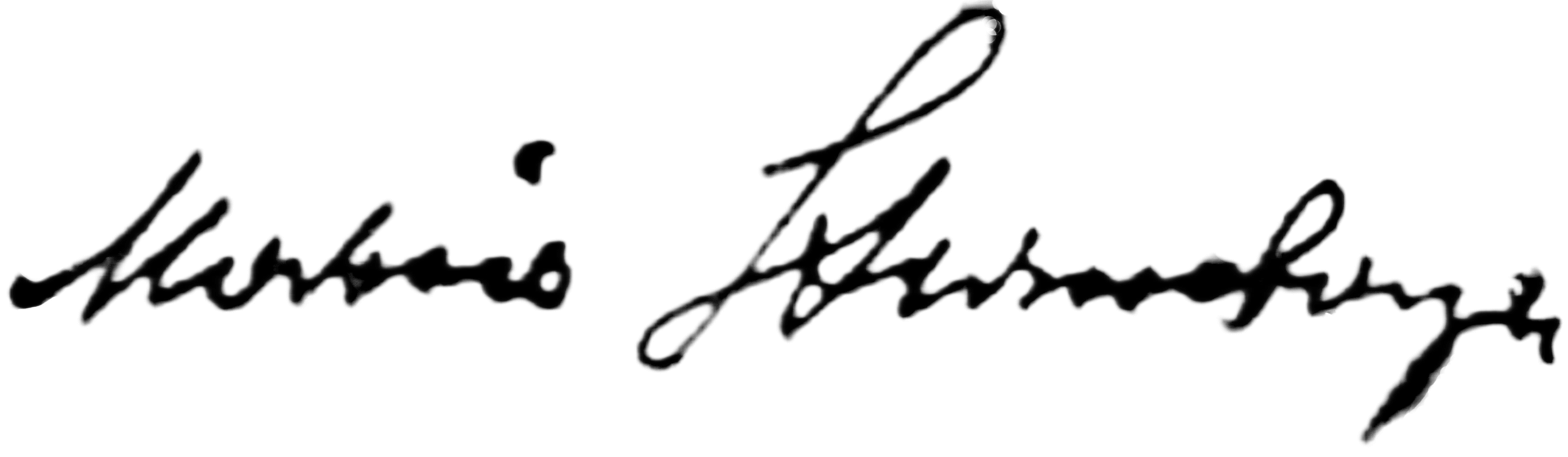

Maria Stromberger (16 March 1898 – 18 May 1957) was an Austrian nurse who is best known for supporting the inmates and their resistance movement at the Auschwitz concentration camp during The Holocaust. After training as a nurse in the late 1930s, she learned of the mistreatment of Jewish people and others in Nazi-occupied Poland. Wishing to help the persecuted, she requested a transfer to Poland. After meeting former inmates of Auschwitz, she took a position as the camp's head nurse for Schutzstaffel (SS) officers to assist the inmates.

After she gained the trust of the inmates, the Auschwitz Combat Group recruited her for resistance activities. For two and a half years, Stromberger smuggled food, medicine, weapons, and information to Auschwitz inmates and delivered information about the camp and its prisoners to the public. Her kind demeanour toward the inmates raised suspicions among SS guards, but her supervisor Eduard Wirths favoured her and overlooked any questionable behaviour. Her service at Auschwitz ended when an irregularity in her medical history led to her reassignment.

Following the Allied victory and liberation of the concentration camps, Stromberger was arrested along with other Auschwitz staff members. She was released after inmates came forward to testify on her behalf. She later provided testimony against Nazi commandant Rudolf Höss and lived in relative obscurity in Austria until her death from a heart attack in 1957.

== Early life ==
Maria Stromberger was born on 16 March 1898 in Metnitz, Carinthia, Austria–Hungary, to Maria Lapeiner and Franz Seraphin Stromberger. The youngest of nine children, including three who died in infancy, she was raised in a Catholic family. Her mother owned and operated an inn, whilst her father worked as a clerk for a merchant. The family held a privileged position among the few property owners in the town, having inherited houses through both parental lines. The Strombergers left Metnitz in 1899 and relocated to Emmersdorf, where Franz became an estate manager. Stromberger fell ill at age six and was not expected to survive, but recovered. The family later moved to Kappel am Krappfeld. After completing her compulsory education, Stromberger took a course to become certified as a kindergarten teacher shortly before World War I, though she never pursued a teaching career.

Stromberger moved to Graz when she was 16, where she lived sporadically for the next 22 years. According to a friend she had later in life, Edek Pys, she mentioned experiencing a tragic love when she was young. While in Graz, Stromberger worked in the Grand Hotel Steirerhof, a high-class hotel owned by her cousin Therese Leeb and her cousin's husband Gatten Karl. She left the job in 1916 to care for her ailing mother, who died the following year. By early 1920, Stromberger resided at Pestalozzistrasse 77, sharing the building with Vinzenz Zotter, who became her brother-in-law in December of that year. In early 1921, she returned to Carinthia. Although she registered as a kindergarten teacher during this period, records do not indicate whether she pursued employment in education. Stromberger stayed in Bregenz for a time in the 1920s with her sister, Karoline Gräbnerm, before returning to Graz in 1926 to continue working at the Grand Hotel Steirerhof as a kitchen assistant. She later moved to work at another inn, where she worked with minimal pay until the owner's death in 1937. During this period, she also served as caretaker for her father following his stroke, continuing until his death in July of that year.

== Nursing career ==
Stromberger expressed interest in nursing since childhood, but she only began studying on 13 November 1937 at age 39. She began her studies at the Sanatorium Bregenz-Mehrerau before training for a year in the Mehrerau Sanitarium. It was during this time that Austria was annexed by Nazi Germany. It is unknown whether Stromberger's training included the more abbreviated Nazi curriculum that included teachings on the Nazi conception of race and genetics. She then attended a nursing school in Heilbronn from 1939 to 1940. Stromberger started her first nursing job at the Klagenfurt District Hospital in Klagenfurt am Wörthersee on 10 October 1940.

She left Klagenfurt to work in Amlach at the Lienz District Hospital on 10 September 1941, where she tended to soldiers of the Wehrmacht (the armed forces of Nazi Germany). Here she heard stories about the poor conditions in Nazi-occupied Poland. Feeling compelled by her religious beliefs to help, she requested a transfer to Poland, which was accepted on 1 May 1942.

Stromberger began her service at an infectious disease hospital in Królewska Huta (present-day Chorzów), southern Poland, on 1 July 1942. Her initial patients included two typhus-afflicted former inmates of the Auschwitz concentration camp. They were violently distressed for several weeks and kept in isolation, where, in states of delirium, they spoke about the camp. Upon recovery, they told Stromberger what they had endured at Auschwitz and begged her to keep it a secret, as all three of their lives would be at risk otherwise. When the men mentioned that there were nurses at Auschwitz wearing the same uniform as hers, it occurred to her that she could request a transfer to Auschwitz. The physician at her hospital asked if she had "lost all [her] reasoning" when she said she was transferring to the camp, and Karoline strongly opposed the idea when Stromberger wrote to her. Stromberger travelled to the neighbouring city of Katowice, where she could formally request a transfer. The nursing administration, perceiving her motivation as an ideological devotion to National Socialism, approved her request. No effort was made to verify whether she was a member of the Nazi Party, and no evidence exists that she ever was.

== Auschwitz concentration camp ==
=== Arrival at Auschwitz in October 1942 ===
Stromberger arrived at Auschwitz on 1 October 1942, in the capacity of a German Red Cross nurse. Robert Mulka, a Hauptsturmführer (a mid-level commander), welcomed her to the camp and briefed her on its operations, stressing the importance of secrecy. She was required to sign two documents affirming her silence, including one that forbade her from having conversations with inmates or carry messages outside of the camp on their behalf. Mulka warned her that she would "pay with her head" if she leaked information about the camp. The affair nearly caused her to leave the camp.

Stromberger began her duties on 30 October, serving as head nurse for Schutzstaffel (SS) officers. Although she had intended to care for the inmates, they were permitted to receive treatment only from inmate physicians. Stromberger was assigned to the SS infirmary as Oberschwester (matron), reporting directly to Eduard Wirths, head of the camp's medical department. In addition to about a dozen nurses who staffed the infirmary, some inmates were forced to work there. She held authority over both the nurses and the inmates. Stromberger was allegedly a strict supervisor, maintaining a reserved demeanour and demanding a great deal of work from those under her authority. She arrived in the midst of a typhus outbreak at Auschwitz, and the severity of the epidemic, coupled with the staff's lack of expertise in infectious disease, quickly made her one of the camp's most valuable medical personnel. Her work kept her in the main facility, Auschwitz I. From the infirmary, she could see inmates being trucked to the gas chambers and the SS on the roof with the poisonous Zyclon B to execute them. She heard the inmates scream as they were taken away.

=== Gaining trust ===
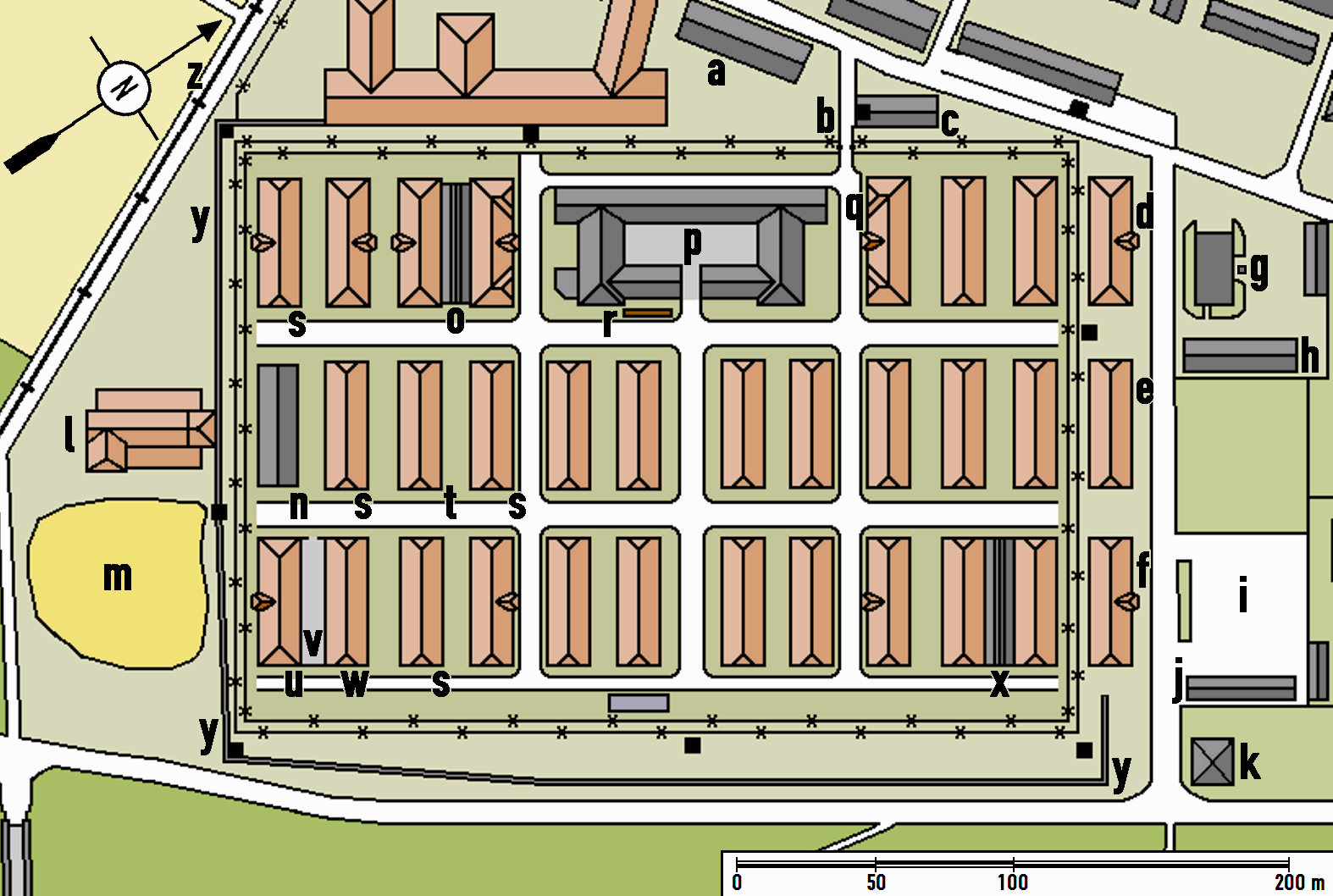
The Auschwitz facility; the SS infirmary (d) is directly across from the gas chamber (g) in the upper right corner.

Although she was not permitted to treat inmates, Stromberger came into contact with those forced to work in the SS infirmary. They were initially wary of her. She first gained the trust of Edek Pys, who worked in the infirmary's kitchen. On one occasion, as she stood by a window, Stromberger saw an inmate run into an electric fence while being shot at, an incident that caused her to faint. Pys ran down the hall to get assistance from another nurse. She later asked Pys why the inmate did this, so he explained the conditions of the camp and why so many inmates killed themselves. He also told her about his own experiences and why he was imprisoned.

Pys encouraged Stromberger to observe the evening roll call, as most inmates were in worse condition than the ones she worked with in the infirmary. Here she saw visibly starved inmates and the bodies of those who had died working that day. Another inmate had Stromberger observe as members of the SS beat and mutilated Jewish children. Her mental health was severely affected by the sight, and she took several days of sick leave. The inmates came to trust her as they came to understand that she felt horror toward the SS. In an act of defiance, she deliberately used her Austrian dialect despite the Nazi expectation that Austrians integrate as Germans.

The inmates' trust in Stromberger was ascertained when Pys was accused of smuggling contraband. He had been pilfering some of the milk that he was supposed to deliver to the SS. When the SS officer Geiger discovered an inmate with the milk, the inmate identified Pys as the source. Geiger attacked Pys, only to be chastised by Stromberger. She gave Geiger a false story, saying that it was spoiled milk that had been given to SS officers with typhus and venereal disease. She then invited Geiger to drink it; he declined the offer. Without intervention, Pys and the inmate found with the milk would have faced execution. Through word of mouth, Stromberger developed a positive reputation among inmates throughout the facility and became a source of morale, seen by the prisoners as a mother figure. Stromberger gained further credit among the inmates when she provided assistance to Zbigniew Raynoch, whose frail health when entering the camp gave him a low chance of survival.

=== Early assistance ===
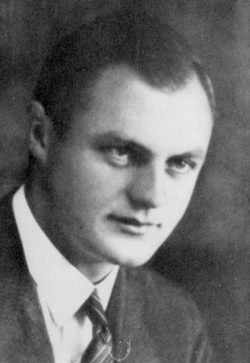
Eduard Wirths was Stromberger's supervisor in Auschwitz.

Pys became Stromberger's main contact among the inmates, and through him she made contact with several more who were forced to work in the SS officers' quarters. Among others, Stromberger worked in secret with Artur Radvanský, Kazimierz Albin, Hermann Langbein, Tadeusz Pietrzykowski, and Stanisław Kłodziński. She felt that the notion of Christian charity obligated her to provide for the inmates. Stromberger scheduled her visits to different parts of the camp so they would not coincide with an SS presence, allowing her to provide food, medicine, and information to the inmates as she went about her duties. She worked with Pys and another inmate, Edugeniusz Niedojadlo, to smuggle food meant for the SS officers. This included some of the special allowances reserved for typhus-infected officers, such as chocolate and champagne. When they warned her that she could be killed for what she was doing, she responded that more important people were already being killed. She gave an attic key to Pietrzykowski so he could collect medicine for the others as needed. To protect the infirmary workers from the evening roll call—a demanding hours-long affair—she insisted that she needed help later into the night and retained them until roll call ended.

Pys contracted typhus at the end of 1942; those who were ill were often executed to prevent the disease from spreading. Stromberger hid the condition while she provided him aid, putting him in the SS infirmary bathroom and telling the officers that it was off limits because it was being used to store the infected clothes of typhus patients. He was eventually forced to go to the inmate infirmary, but he was not selected for execution and she then helped fulfill his work responsibilities for him as he recovered his strength.

An Unterscharführer (a junior SS rank), Alfred Kaulfuss, grew suspicious of Stromberger and made it a point to monitor her and try to have her removed. He first reported her to her supervisor, Wirths, in January 1943. Wirths told Stromberger that others had made similar complaints, and he warned her about the possibility of becoming an inmate herself if she was not more careful. Stromberger told him that she was a nurse, not a member of the SS, and that he could report her to the Political Department if this did not satisfy him. She then requested a transfer. Wirths valued Stromberger and wished to retain her as a nurse. He overlooked the reports and promised to protect her from what he described as "any further slander". Kaulfuss pressed the issue with Wirths, so Stromberger requested that she be present to hear accusations made against her. When this took place, she told Kaulfuss and Wirths that Kaulfuss had once drunkenly torn up a photograph of the SS commander Heinrich Himmler and that he was not in a place to question anyone's loyalty. Wirths later nominated Stromberger for an award for her nursing. Pys offered to take abuse from her to avoid suspicion, but she refused.

=== Joining the resistance movement ===
As her work at Auschwitz continued, Stromberger learned that there was an active resistance movement smuggling information out of the camp and disrupting its operations. Their inability to reach the outside world made it difficult to maintain their efforts. One faction of the resistance, the Auschwitz Combat Group, considered Stromberger their best prospect of gaining an ally among the staff. Raynoch, a member of the group's leadership and a beneficiary of Stromberger's actions, collaborated with Pys to recruit her. Pys asked her if she was willing to assist in more dangerous ways, and she agreed. As Stromberger did not speak Polish, she communicated with the group in a code common to the resistance members.

Given Stromberger's importance among the camp's medical staff, she was given significant leeway in her activities. Her position allowed her to travel between the various camps within the Auschwitz complex, further enabling her ability to reach the inmates. Stromberger's position allowed her to collect information as she overheard conversations of officers and guards, and through her interactions with the camp's commandant, Rudolf Höss, who held her in high regard. Her influence also made the infirmary a hub of the resistance movement. She monitored the SS officers who entered the infirmary and found excuses to expel the ones with violent reputations.

Several more incidents turned Stromberger against the SS over the following months and reinforced her desire to help the inmates. She nearly fainted upon seeing a bloodied man following his attempt to escape and the subsequent interrogation—the SS officer laughed when she turned pale. Then in the first days of 1943, Stromberger saw three trucks full of naked, sickly, starved men driving toward the crematorium. Agonising her was that she was wearing her nurse's uniform as she watched the men be taken to their deaths, unable to provide them aid.

=== Resistance activity ===
By early 1943, Stromberger was engaging in activity inside and outside of the camp on behalf of the inmates. Finding excuses to enter the inmates' areas of the camp, where nurses typically were not allowed, she collected some of the earliest evidence of what took place there and smuggled it out. She also carried information detailing more sensitive information about the camp such as lists of those killed, provided to her in reports acquired by Kłodziński and Langbein. Upon receiving one, Stromberger hid it somewhere inconspicuous, such as among ration cards or in a matchbox. She then carried it with her when she left the camp to go to the store in Oświęcim for food. She would meet with a liaison at the train station or a nearby town to hand it off. Resistance members outside of the camp listed her in their records as "Sister" and "S". She also carried deliveries within the camp from the inmates to guards who were on their side.

While outside, she collected information for the inmates and acquired rations and other things, eventually including pistols, ammunition, and explosives. The weapons ultimately went unused, as the camp was liberated before an uprising could take place. In fear of having her items searched, Stromberger smuggled contraband into the camp by hiding it in the waistline of her nurse's uniform or by taping it to her calves. Also among the things she collected was poison, so the inmates could take their own lives if they were to be tortured.

In December 1943, Stromberger smuggled a feast, including wine and champagne, into the infirmary to hold a Christmas party in the attic for the inmates who worked there. Describing his experience, Langbein felt that Stromberger participated as one of their own. The Christmas party was attended by 17 inmates, including Jews and Communists who did not celebrate the holiday. The Jewish inmates took turns standing watch, while everyone inside was ready to disguise the scene as an effort to clean the attic. Stromberger hosted a similar Christmas party in the boiler room the following year.

=== Increased pressure ===
As the mass killings of Jewish people became a larger part of operations in Auschwitz in 1944, members of the staff were required to sign a document that included a pledge of support for the killings and agreement to carry them out. Stromberger refused to sign it, telling Wirths that it violated her responsibility as a medical professional. He allowed her to cross out that provision of the document, in contrast to staff members in other departments who were told they would become inmates if they did not sign.

Stromberger first considered fleeing the camp in early 1944, deciding to flee to Switzerland while on leave. She told Pys of her plan, so he warned the Auschwitz Combat Group and Raynoch convinced Stromberger not to go. She took two weeks off that August, staying in Bregenz with her sister. She ultimately returned and brought with her two of her father's revolvers, giving one to the Auschwitz Combat Group's leader and the other to Pys. She gave Pys his choice between the two.

With the Red Army advancing in Poland, the inmates sought escape, fearing the SS would kill them all if the camp was about to be overtaken. Stromberger began escorting Pys to the plant nursery in Rajsko on trips to obtain flowers for the infirmary. This gave him an opportunity to learn the geography around the camp for a possible escape attempt. When some of the inmates planned an escape attempt on 27 October 1944, Stromberger was one of the few aware of their intentions.

=== Illness and departure ===
In December 1944, Stromberger fell ill with polyarteritis, and Wirths provided her with morphine. She refused to use it and secretly poured it out after receiving it. Her condition left her bedridden with severe joint inflammation. Stromberger's biographer, Harald Walser, attributes the intense stress of her work in Auschwitz as a factor in her illness's severity. Despite her condition, Stromberger was forced to leave her bed when an Allied air raid on the Auschwitz camp destroyed the nurse's facility where she had stashed documents and contraband. Accompanied by an inmate, she recovered the items before they were discovered, which would have implicated her in the resistance movement. These were the final items she gave to the liaison, delivering them on 31 December.

Stromberger was ordered to report to the SS office in Berlin in January 1945. Here she spoke to the Red Cross head army nurse, who sent Stromberger to a neurological hospital in Prague. Arriving at the hospital on 6 January, she had medical history taken by an Oberscharfüher doctor and discovered that Wirths had misdiagnosed her with a morphine addiction. The inmates who had worked with Stromberger, including Pys, Kłodziński, and Langbein, believed Wirths did this deliberately to get her safely away from the camp. She left Prague on 31 January, arriving home in Bregenz on 3 February.

=== Arrest and exoneration ===
In the French occupation zone lives Maria Stromberger, an Austrian, who was a nurse in the SS hospital in the Auschwitz concentration camp. She was arrested and accused of cooperation with SS in the concentration camp. Nurse Maria must be released! She worked with resistance organisations in the camp, smuggled weapons and explosive materials, documents and reports. Her messages saved many thousands of people from the extermination. In the history of this war, there were only a few informants as dedicated and devoted as her.

— Echo Krakowa

Stromberger was physically unwell when she returned home to Bregenz. She was still recovering from her illness, and the stress of her experiences affected her cardiovascular health. On 14 March, she began treatment for inflammation of her shoulder joint. She was lonely in Bregenz, having no one to communicate with beyond her housemates: her sister Karoline and her niece Hedwig. They later took in Józef Nowacki, a former Auschwitz inmate who had worked in the dentist's office next to her infirmary. They did not do so entirely by choice, as he continued visiting until he was effectively a permanent resident, desolate and unable to act independently. They came to resent Nowacki's presence as he began verbally abusing them, and his use of Stromberger's bedroom meant that the sisters were forced to share a room. Stromberger was saddened that Pys was unable to visit or write to her amid the chaos in Austria and Poland that came after the war.

Stromberger's presence at Auschwitz made her a suspect in the mass killings of the inmates. It was believed she had helped execute inmates using injections of phenol. By April, wanted notices for Stromberger appeared in Austrian newspapers. French forces bombarded Bregenz on 30 April and seized the city from German control on 1 May. Stromberger's home was not damaged in the battle. She was arrested and spent several weeks in prison before being transported to an internment camp for Nazis in Brederis, Rankweil. She was allowed a significant level of freedom within the camp, but she was enraged by the Nazi inmates who complained about their treatment. By this time her health had returned, and she spent her days learning French. Nowacki attempted to run the household while Stromberger was imprisoned and made no effort to secure her release. Karoline sent him away after he showed up one day drunk with a woman, and he left with many of Stromberger's possessions. The ordeal left Stromberger feeling deeply betrayed.

Pys eventually received a letter from Stromberger describing her internment, so he contacted influential people who had also been held in Auschwitz. One of them, Tadeusz Holuj, had recently become editor-in-chief of the newspaper Echo Krakowa. The paper ran a front-page article demanding that she be freed. A former resistance leader and future prime minister of communist Poland, Józef Cyrankiewicz, negotiated her release. She was freed on 23 September 1946, after approximately six months of detainment.

Stromberger testified against the commandant of Auschwitz, Rudolf Höss, in 1947. She was greeted with "storming ovations" when she returned to Poland for Höss's trial. Hoss was surprised to hear one of his own employees testify against him. The trial only received major press coverage in Poland, and her testimony received even less attention, but it dispelled the idea that she had ever collaborated with the SS. While in Poland, Stromberger reconnected with the former inmates who lived in the area. Pys travelled to attend her testimony, and she then accompanied him to his hometown of Rzeszów to spend Easter with him and his new wife. She returned to Austria on 18 April, where she submitted documents from the testimony to the French authorities, exonerating her.

== Later life and death ==
Stromberger maintained contact with the former inmates of Auschwitz for the rest of her life. By June 1947, she was renting a room from her nephew, Wilhelm Lapeiner, in Pörtschach am Wörthersee. Here she briefly found comfort, describing herself as living "quite peacefully and contentedly, as far as is possible under today's circumstances". She returned to Bregenz the following month to support Karoline during an eye operation.

Stromberger gave up nursing after her experiences in Auschwitz, abandoning her plan to be a children's nurse. For a time, she considered working as a massage therapist and began studying for the job. She became a cook in Switzerland in October 1948, but she returned to Bregenz by January 1949 where she began working as a supervisor in a textile factory. The former inmates encouraged Stromberger to seek a better job or to join them in Poland, but she had to care for her sister and she did not wish to leave her home country.

Stromberger found herself repulsed by the rehabilitation of former Nazis in Austria and the nation's movement toward ignoring the Holocaust, but she had no interest in getting involved politically. She grew annoyed by Langbein's many attempts to get her involved in the Communist Party of Austria, though she assisted him when he was collecting evidence to arrest the Auschwitz gynaecologist Carl Clauberg in the 1950s. She chose not to attend any meetings with Holocaust survivors' organisations, feeling that the presence of an Auschwitz staff member would be inappropriate.

Stromberger's heart condition prevented her from engaging in strenuous activity, so she devoted all of her time to her day job at the textile factory as well as work as a freelance masseuse. She applied for a disability pension in 1956, but the process to approve it moved slowly. She was saddened by the deaths of her siblings Franz and Adelheid in the early 1950s. Stromberger died of a heart attack in Bregenz on 18 May 1957. This allegedly happened following a dentist appointment in which she had ten teeth pulled, but this was never verified. Karoline had her cremated, doing so in secret as it was against Catholic teachings at the time, and buried her urn in Aeschacher Friedhof on 31 August 1957. Pys speculated that Stromberger wished to be cremated as a demonstration of solidarity with the victims of the Holocaust, as cremation was also forbidden in Judaism. Her pension request was approved the following year.

== Legacy ==
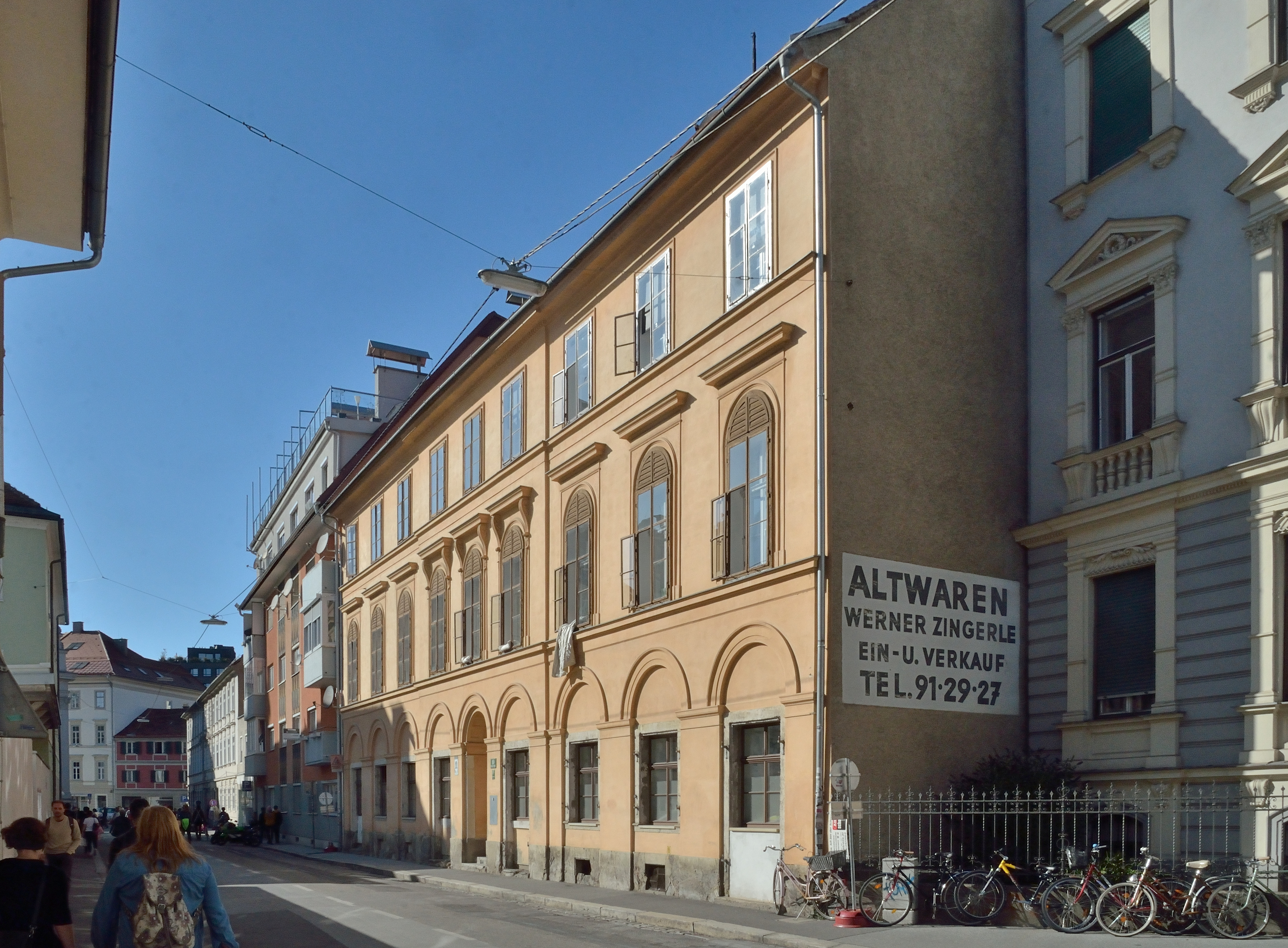
Kernstockgasse 10 in 2019, prior to the street's renaming to Maria-Stromberger-Gasse in 2024

The extent of Stromberger's care for the inmates became known only after she had left Auschwitz. Although regarded as a national hero by the Polish resistance, she lived in relative obscurity in Austria and rejected any idea that she was a hero. Her apolitical stance limited her recognition compared with other resistance figures; she had assisted both nationalists and communists, yet neither considered her fully part of their movement. She accepted this, fearing that any recognition from communists was an attempt to co-opt her story for political purposes.

Obituaries for Stromberger were written in Austrian newspapers such as the communist Volksstimme and Catholic Die Furche, but among Austrians the full extent of her actions in Auschwitz were only known to a few people. Holocaust survivors' organisations sent many letters to Karoline expressing condolences, and Pys said that it was as if his mother had died. Stromberger received more attention over the following decades, including recognition at the Austria exhibition of the Auschwitz-Birkenau State Museum beginning in 1978. She became associated with the moniker "The Angel of Auschwitz", a name she shared with another person from the camp, Angela Maria Autsch.

The Johann August Malin Society began producing articles and lectures about Stromberger in 1983, and the Maximillan Kolbe Foundation featured her in various works in the 1990s. Markus Barnay produced a video about Stromberger in 1995, and Anita Lackenberger produced one in 2016. Her correspondences and other documents related to her actions were preserved by her niece, Hedwig Gerber. Stromberger first received scholarly attention with an article by Andreas Eder in 2007, and more American and German academics wrote about her in the years that followed, including Langbein. The historian and politician Harald Walser wrote a biography about Stromberger in 2021, Ein Engel in der Hölle von Auschwitz ('An Angel in the Hell of Auschwitz'), consulting archives and conducting interviews as an effort to commemorate her.

A depiction of Stromberger appeared as a supporting character in the 2020 film The Champion. A play about her, Stromberger oder Bilder von allem, premiered at Vorarlberger Landestheater in 2024.

=== Honours ===
Stromberger was named an honorary member of the Austrian Union of Former Prisoners of Concentration Camps shortly after the war ended, and in 1955 she was named as an honorary member of the executive committee of the Holocaust survivors' group KZ-Verband. She was honoured at a ceremony celebrating the tenth anniversary of Auschwitz's liberation in January 1955, though she chose not to attend. She was honoured by the nation of Poland in 1956. The Mehrerau monastery unveiled a plaque for Stromberger in May 1995, and the Wernberg monastery created one in 2016. A monument to Stromberger was designed in 2024 for her hometown of Metnitz.

The Malin Society successfully campaigned to have a small road named after Stromberger in the 1980s. A street in Graz was named Maria-Stromberger-Gasse in her honour on 1 February 2024. The name was changed from Kernstockgasse, named for the nationalist poet Ottokar Kernstock, as part of an effort by the town to remove 20 street names deemed "very problematic" by a commission of historians. A street was named for her in Rzeszów in June 2026 and a plaque was designed in her honour to be placed in one of the city's secondary schools.
