= Paweł Szefernaker =

Polish politician

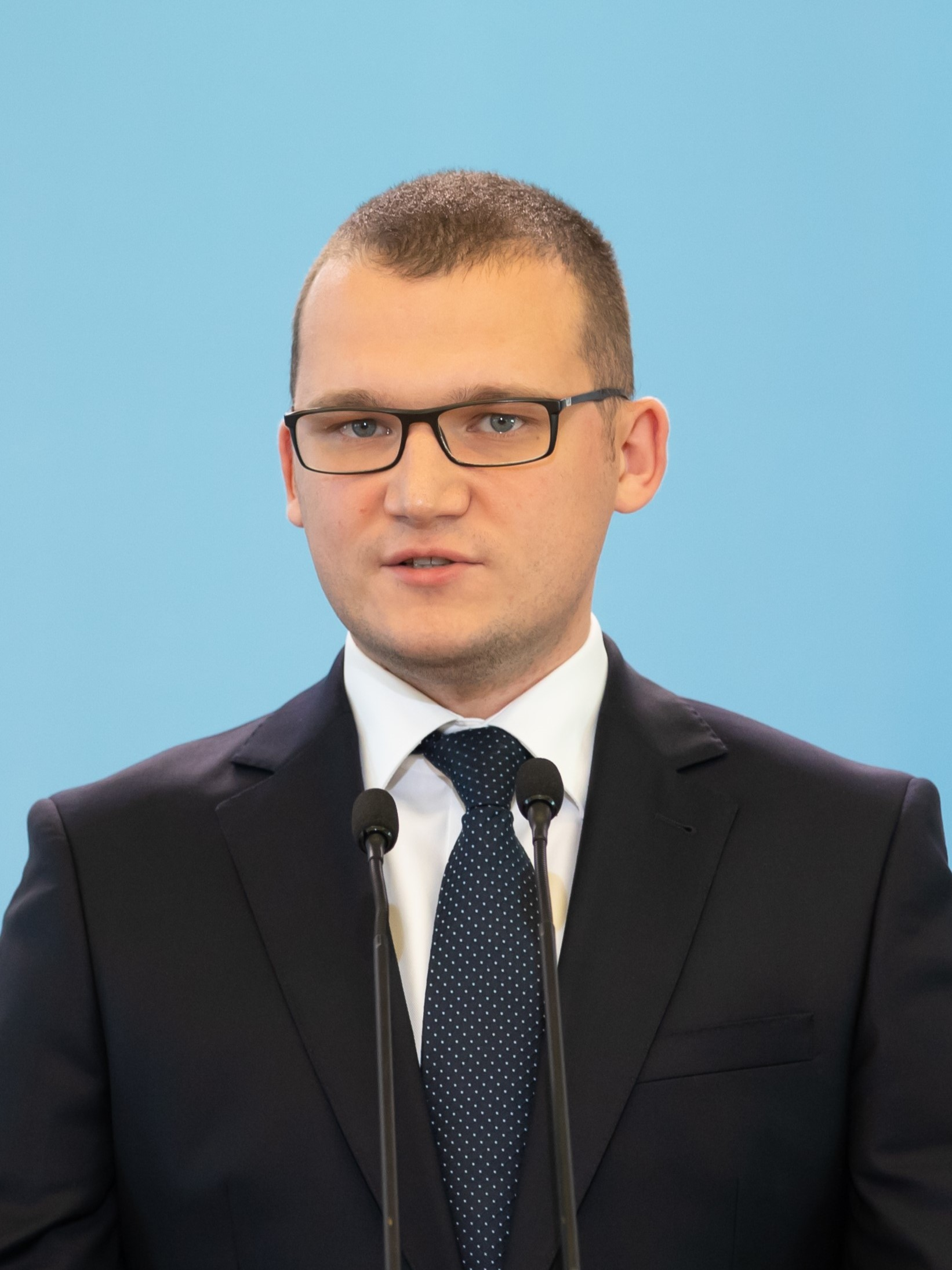
- Szefernaker In 2018

Member of the Sejm
- In office 25 October 2015 – 7 July 2025
- Constituency: 40 Koszalin

Minister of the Interior and Administration
- In office 27 November – 13 December 2023
- Prime Minister: Mateusz Morawiecki
- Preceded by: Mariusz Kamiński
- Succeeded by: Marcin Kierwiński

Personal details
- Born: 27 February 1987 (age 39) Szczecin, Poland
- Party: Law and Justice
- Education: European School of Law and Administration
- Profession: Politician

Paweł Maciej Szefernaker (Note: Polish pronunciation: [ˈpavɛw ʂɛfɛrˈnakɛr]) (born 27 February 1987) is a Polish politician who served as Minister of the Interior and Administration in the Third Cabinet of Mateusz Morawiecki from 27 November to 13 December 2023. He also served as Secretary of State in the Chancellery of the Prime Minister of Poland from 2015 to 2018. He is also a Member of the Sejm, of the VII, IX and X cadency. and used to head the Law and Justice Youth Forum. Szefernaker was included on the New Europe 100 list.

Party political offices
Preceded by Marcin Mastalerek	Chairman of the Law and Justice Youth Forum; 2014–present	Incumbent
