= Rzepecki =

Rzepecki (feminine: Rzepecka; plural: Rzepeccy) is a Polish noble surname (Rzepeccy herbu Białynia), Russified as Rzhepetsky (Ржепецкий) when Poland was part of the Russian Empire. It is a toponymic surname associated with the location Rzepedź. Notable people with the surname include:

- Anton Rzhepetsky (1868–1932), Ukrainian politician, financier, and statesman
- Iza Moszczeńska-Rzepecka (1864–1941), Polish feminist journalist, translator and suffragette
- Jan Rzepecki (1899–1983), Polish soldier and military historian
- Karol Rzepecki (1865–1931), Polish politician
- Łukasz Rzepecki (born 1992), Polish politician
- Michelle Rzepecki (born 1986), Australian goalball player
- Mikhail Rzhepetsky (1853–1914), Russian general
