= Michał Bohun =

Polish philosopher, historian of philosophy, and social thought (born 1970)

- Born: 1970
- Occupations: philosopher, historian of philosophy and social thought

Michał Bohun (born 1970) is a philosopher, historian of philosophy and social thought, professor at the Jagiellonian University.

== Biography ==
In 1994, he completed his master's degree in philosophy at the Jagiellonian University. In 1999, he obtained a doctorate in philosophy at the Jagiellonian University based on his thesis Filozofia społeczna Konstantina Leontjewa (Konstantin Leontiev's Social Philosophy), supervised by Włodzimierz Andrzej Rydzewski. In the same year, he began working at the Jagiellonian University. In 2009, he obtained his habilitation in the humanities in the field of philosophy based on work Oczyszczenie przez burzę. Włodzimierz Ern i moskiewscy neosłowianofile wobec pierwszej wojny światowej (Purification by Storm: Vladimir Ern and the Moscow Neo-Slavophiles and the First World War).

His research interests include the history of Russian thought, the history of 19th-20th century philosophy, the history of ideas, social philosophy, and the history of social and political thought. At the Jagiellonian University, he taught courses on topics including the history of Marxism. He supervised one doctoral dissertation. He was the director of the Institute of Philosophy at the Jagiellonian University. He became a member of the Kuźnica Association.

== Books ==
- Oczyszczenie przez burzę. Włodzimierz Ern i moskiewscy neosłowianofile wobec pierwszej wojny światowej. Jagiellońskie Studia z Filzofii Rosyjskiej. Vol. 15. Wydawnictwo Uniwersytetu Jagiellońskiego. 2008.
