= Łukasz Rzepecki =

Polish politician

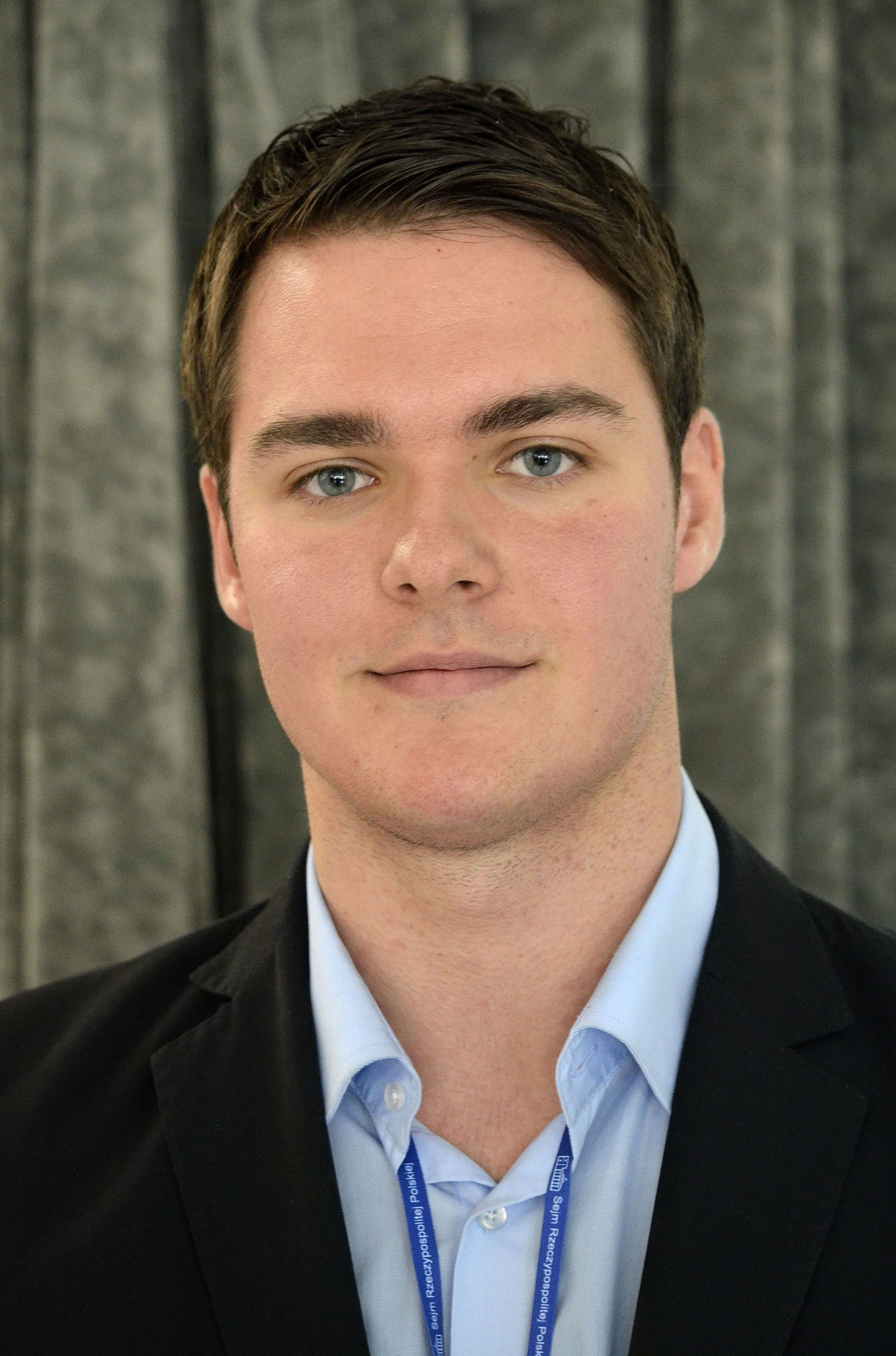

Member of the Sejm
- In office 25 October 2015 – 11 November 2019

Personal details
- Born: 5 September 1992 (age 34) Zgierz, Poland
- Party: Kukiz'15
- Spouse: Kamila Ślązak
- Education: University of Łódź
- Profession: Politician

Łukasz Adrian Rzepecki (born 5 September 1992) is a Polish politician, lawyer, former parliamentarian.

Graduate of the University of Łódź, he was the Chief of Staff to Marcin Mastalerek and a legislative assistant to Janusz Wojciechowski. Subsequently, he was the secretary of the Law and Justice party in the Łódź region and the chairman of the regional structures of the Law and Justice Youth Forum.

In 2010 he was elected a councillor in Ozorków. In 2014 successfully ran for councillor in Łódź. In 2015 Polish parliamentary elections Rzepecki was elected to Sejm, representing Law and Justice party. He was the youngest parliamentarian elected in these elections. On October 13 he joined the Kukiz'15 parliamentary club after being banished from PiS.
