= Auschwitz Combat Group =

Resistance organization within the Auschwitz concentration camp

- Grupa Bojowa Oświęcim; GBO
- Other name: Kampfgruppe Auschwitz
- Leader: Ernst Burger
- Founded: 1943
- Country: Nazi Germany
- Allegiance: Polish Underground State
- Active regions: Gau Upper Silesia
- Ideology: Socialist
- Political position: Anti-Nazi
- Part of: Resistance movement in Auschwitz

The Auschwitz Combat Group (German: Kampfgruppe Auschwitz, Polish: Grupa Bojowa Oświęcim, GBO) was an international left-wing resistance organization in Auschwitz concentration camp.

== History ==
The GBO was founded in 1943. In 1944, together with the Polish Underground State, the group set up an overall Auschwitz Military Council to coordinate resistance.

== Members ==
The majority of members of the group were communists, socialists, captured Polish and Soviet partisans, members of anti-Nazi resistance movements, and former members of International Brigades. The members of the Kampfgruppe Auschwitz were from Austria, Poland, France, Germany, Yugoslavia, Czechoslovakia and the Soviet Union. Among them were also many Jews.

=== Leadership ===
- Ernst Burger (nom de guerre Adam) – political leader of the Kampfgruppe Auschwitz and member of the anti-Nazi Austrian Resistance
- Hermann Langbein (nom de guerre Wiktor)
- Józef Cyrankiewicz (nom de guerre Rot) – responsible for cooperation with resistance groups in other Nazi concentration camps
- Tadeusz Hołuj (nom de guerre Robert) – responsible for cooperation with other resistance groups in Auschwitz
- Heinrich Dürmayer – appointed after Hermann Langbein
- Ludwig Soswinski – was appointed after Tadeusz Hołuj
- Bruno Baum – was appointed after Ernst Burger
- Otto Heller
- Arpad Haasz

=== Other notable members ===
- Alfred Klahr – Austrian communist politician and intellectual
- Karl Lill
- Franz Danimann
- Maria Stromberger

== See also ==
- Resistance movement in Auschwitz
- Austrian Resistance
- Polish resistance movement in World War II
- Jewish resistance under Nazi rule
