= Włodzimierz Rydzewski =

Polish philosopher (1946–2007)

- Born: 28 November 1946
- Died: 3 January 2007 (aged 60)
- Occupation: philosopher

Włodzimierz Rydzewski (28 November 1946 – 3 January 2007) was a philosopher, researcher of Russian thought, professor of the Jagiellonian University, dean of the Faculty of Philosophy of the Jagiellonian University, founder of the Department of Russian Philosophy of the Jagiellonian University, journalist and social activist.

== Biography ==
His research interests included social philosophy, the history of Russian philosophy, the history of contemporary philosophy, and Marxism. He supervised six doctoral dissertations, including those of Michał Bohun, Leszek Augustyn, and Marek Kita. He lectured at the Institute of Philosophy of the Jagiellonian University and at the Faculty of Organization and Management of the Silesian University of Technology, in the Department of Applied Social Sciences. He collaborated with Andrzej Walicki and Marek Siemek, among others. He was a member of the Kuźnica Association and an editor (and for a time, editor-in-chief) of the magazine Zdanie.

He served as the First Secretary of the basic party organization of the Polish United Workers' Party at the Institute of Philosophy and Religious Studies of the Jagiellonian University.

He was buried at the Rakowicki Cemetery in Kraków.

== Books ==
- Kropotkin. 1979.
- Filozofia polityczna rosyjskiego narodnictwa. 1988.
- Powrót Bakunina: szkice o „rosyjskiej idei” i mitach lewicy. 1993.
- Kropotkina pomoc wzajemna. 1997.
- Filozofia rosyjska wobec problemów modernizacyjnych, with Michał Bohun. 1999.
- W kręgu idei Włodzimierza Sołowjowa. 2002.
- Między reformą a rewolucją: rosyjska myśl filozoficzna, polityczna i społeczna na przełomie XIX i XX wieku. 2004.
- Granice Europy – granice filozofii: filozofia a tożsamość Rosji, with Leszek Augustyn. 2007.
- Dylematy rosyjskiej idei. Artykuły, szkice, recenzje, edited by Leszek Augustyn and Michał Bohun
