= Sejm Constituency no. 6 =

Parliamentary constituency in Poland

The Lublin constituency covers the city of Lublin and the surrounding area, in the east of Poland.

Lublin is a Polish parliamentary constituency in the Lublin Voivodeship. It elects fifteen members of the Sejm.

The district has the number '6' and is named after the city of Lublin. It includes the counties of Janów, Kraśnik, Łęczna, Lubartów, Lublin, Łuków, Opole, Puławy, Ryki, and Świdnik and the city county of Lublin.

== List of deputies ==
Deputies for the 10th Sejm (2023–2027)
Deputy	Party	Parliamentary group
Kazimierz Choma	Law and Justice	Law and Justice
Przemysław Czarnek	Law and Justice	Law and Justice
Magdalena Filipek-Sobczak	Law and Justice	Law and Justice
Michał Moskal	Law and Justice	Law and Justice
Sławomir Skwarek	Law and Justice	Law and Justice
Artur Soboń	Law and Justice	Law and Justice
Sylwester Tułajew	Law and Justice	Law and Justice
Jan Kanthak	Sovereign Poland	Law and Justice
Anna Bałuch	Civic Platform	Civic Coalition
Krzysztof Bojarski	Civic Platform	Civic Coalition
Michał Krawczyk	Civic Platform	Civic Coalition
Marta Wcisło	Civic Platform	Civic Coalition
Jacek Czerniak	New Left	The Left
Krzysztof Hetman	Polish People's Party	Polish People's Party
Joanna Mucha	Poland 2050	Poland 2050
Bartłomiej Pejo	Confederation	Confederation
