= Marcin Mastalerek =

Polish politician (born 1984)

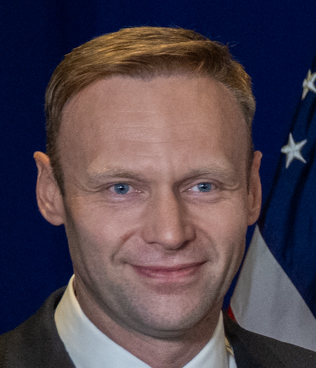
- Marcin Mastalerek (2025)

Member of the Sejm
- In office 8 November 2011 – 11 November 2015
- Constituency: Sieradz

Chairman of Law and Justice Youth Forum
- In office 31 March 2011 – 4 July 2014
- Preceded by: Adam Hofman
- Succeeded by: Paweł Szefernaker

Personal details
- Born: 15 September 1984 (age 41)
- Party: Law and Justice

Marcin Mastalerek (born 15 September 1984) is a Polish politician of Law and Justice. Since 2023, he has served as chief of cabinet of the Chancellery of the President of the Republic of Poland. He was previously a member of the Sejm from 2011 to 2015, and chairman of Law and Justice Youth Forum from 2011 to 2014.
