= Sylwester Tułajew =

Polish politician (born 1981)

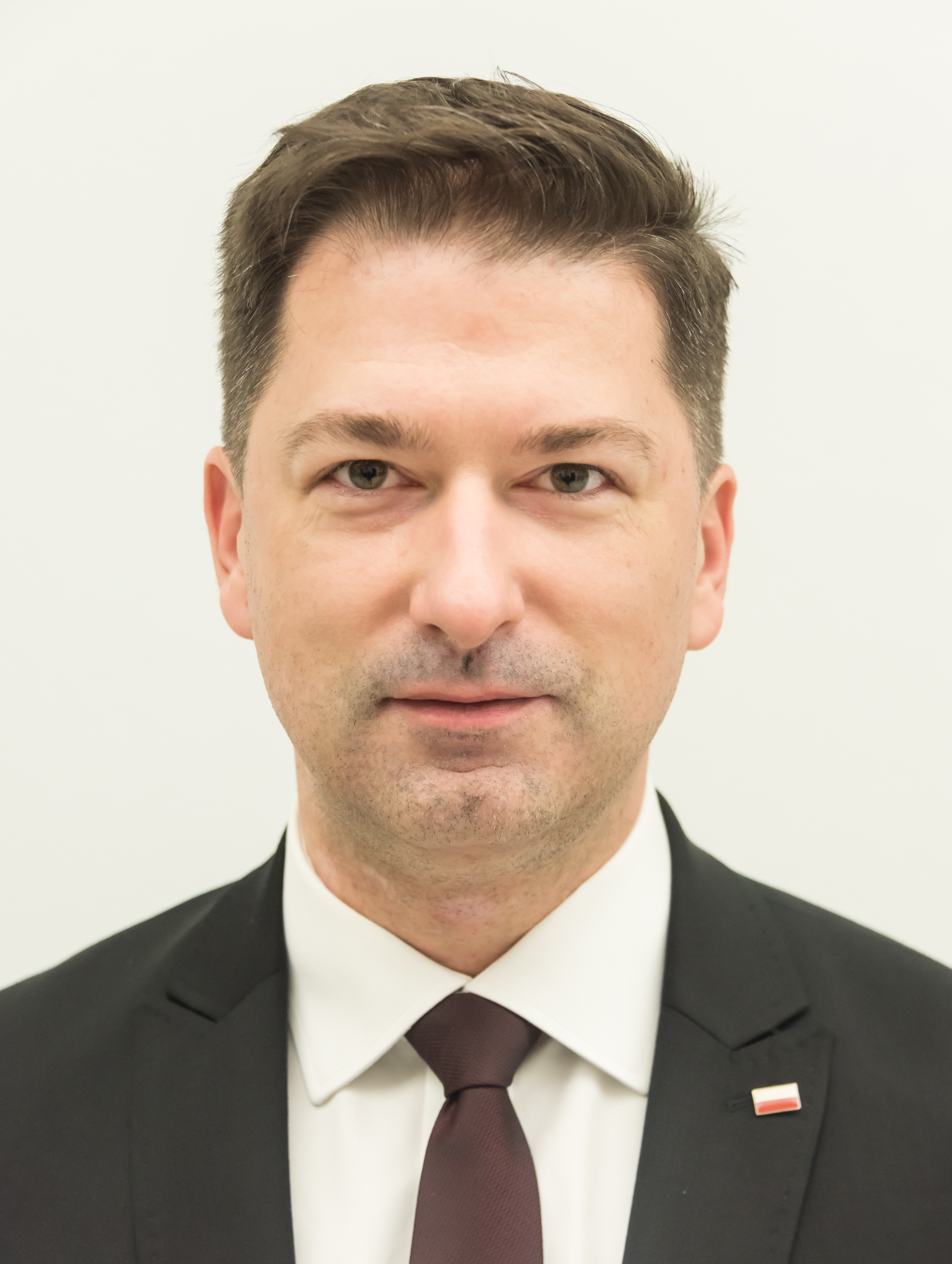
- Tułajew in 2022

Member of the Sejm
- Incumbent
- Assumed office 12 November 2015
- Constituency: Lublin

Personal details
- Born: 30 December 1981 (age 44)
- Party: Law and Justice

Sylwester Tułajew (born 30 December 1981) is a Polish politician serving as a member of the Sejm since 2015. In 2019, he served as deputy minister of the interior and administration.
