= Mariusz Kamiński =

Polish politician (born 1965), member of the Sejm RP

Mariusz Kamiński MEP
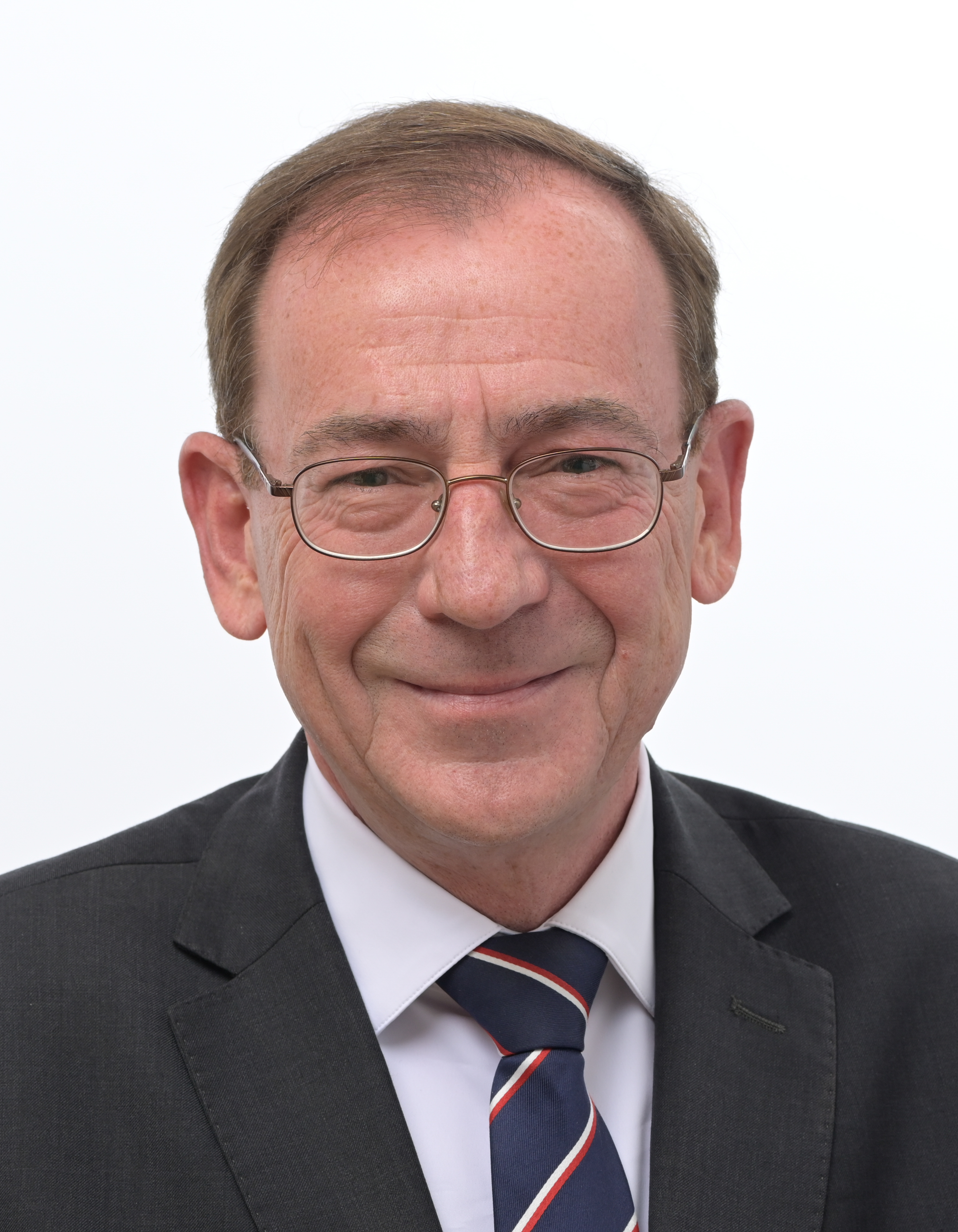
- Kamiński in 2024

Member of the European Parliament
- Incumbent
- Assumed office 16 July 2024

Minister of the Interior and Administration
- In office 14 August 2019 – 27 November 2023
- Prime Minister: Mateusz Morawiecki
- Preceded by: Elżbieta Witek
- Succeeded by: Paweł Szefernaker

Coordinator of Secret Services
- In office 16 November 2015 – 27 November 2023
- Prime Minister: Beata Szydło (2015-2017); Mateusz Morawiecki (2017-2023)
- Preceded by: Marek Biernacki
- Succeeded by: Tomasz Siemoniak

Head of the Central Anticorruption Bureau
- In office 3 August 2006 – 13 October 2009
- Succeeded by: Paweł Wojtunik

Member of the Sejm
- In office 20 October 1997 – 18 October 2001
- Constituency: State list
- In office 19 October 2001 – 12 November 2023
- Constituency: 19 – Warsaw
- In office 13 November 2023 – 21 December 2023
- Constituency: 7 – Chełm

Personal details
- Born: 25 September 1965 (age 61) Sochaczew, Poland
- Party: Law and Justice
- Education: University of Warsaw

Mariusz Kamiński (born 25 September 1965) is a Polish politician who served as the head of the Central Anticorruption Bureau (CBA) from August 2006 to October 2009. He served between 2019 and 2023 as the Minister of the Interior and Administration, in addition to coordinating Polish secret services, which he had done previously as a minister without portfolio. Kamiński also served as a member of the Sejm (1997–2006, 2011–2023).

== Career ==
In 1981, he was sentenced to one year's probation for desecrating the Red Army Gratitude Monument by participating in painting inscriptions on it. On 1 May 1983, during an unauthorized demonstration, he was detained for making "hostile" shouts, resulting in charges under the 1969 Criminal Code for using violence or threats against a public official and insulting a public body or political organization. He was released on 3 May 1983 and faced ongoing legal obligations and school expulsion, yet an amnesty in July 1983 halted these proceedings.

He completed his secondary education at Bolesław Chrobry XX High School in Warsaw and later studied at the University of Warsaw's History Institute, where he was active in underground student organizations and co-founded the Federation of Fighting Youth periodicals. He was also engaged in the Independent Students' Association.

His political career included roles in various governmental and non-governmental organizations. In the 1997 parliamentary elections, he was elected as an MP and subsequently re-elected in 2001 and 2005. He held significant positions within the Law and Justice party and was instrumental in the establishment of the Central Anticorruption Bureau in 2006, which he led until his brief departure from the party.

Rejoining Law and Justice in 2011, he continued to hold influential party and governmental positions, including being re-elected to the parliament multiple times, the last being in 2023. His roles evolved to include significant responsibilities such as Minister of the Interior and Administration and coordinating special services.

Kamiński's political career has also been marked by allegations of abuse of power, particularly in relation to the preparations for the 2020 presidential elections, which led to an investigation by the Supreme Audit Office. His parliamentary mandate expired in December 2023 following a court verdict.

=== Controversies and legal proceedings ===
==== Charges and initial dismissal ====
On 6 October 2009 Mariusz Kamiński faced charges by the Regional Prosecutor's Office in Rzeszów, accused of exceeding his powers and committing offences against the credibility of documents, including falsifications related to a "land scandal." Kamiński denied the allegations. Following these charges, he was dismissed from his position by Prime Minister Donald Tusk on 13 October 2009. In September 2010, following an indictment, Kamiński was also dismissed from service under Article 64 of the amended CBA Act.

==== Court rulings and presidential clemency ====
On 20 June 2012 the Warszawa-Śródmieście District Court dismissed the proceedings against Kamiński, ruling the accusations lacked merit, which was later overturned on 6 December 2012 by a regional court decision.

In March 2015, Kamiński was found guilty and sentenced to three years' imprisonment, but before the appeal was heard, he received a presidential pardon from President Andrzej Duda on 16 November 2015, which led to the discontinuation of proceedings in March 2016.

==== Challenges to presidential clemency ====
The Supreme Court declared the act of clemency ineffective on 31 May 2017. However, on 17 July 2018 the Constitutional Tribunal expanded the interpretation of the constitutional right of clemency. On 2 June 2023 the Constitutional Tribunal ruled that the right of clemency is a prerogative of the President and is beyond judicial review.

==== Legal developments after 2023 elections ====
In December 2023 his mandate expired due to him being sentenced to prison for an intentional crime. In January 2024, Mariusz Kamiński was arrested at Poland's Presidential Palace due to a two-year jail sentence handed down by a Warsaw court in December 2023. On 20 December 2023 he was sentenced to two years' imprisonment and banned from holding public office for five years, with the sentence beginning in January 2024. However, after serving only 13 days and undertaking a hunger strike, he was again pardoned by President Andrzej Duda on 23 January 2024. Subsequent investigations into Kamiński's actions while under a ban from public office led to further charges in April 2024, highlighting ongoing legal and political disputes surrounding his career.

== Personal life ==
He was born in Sochaczew as the son of Arkadiusz and Teresa. Kamiński was previously married to Anna Kasprzyszak, a Polish journalist and opposition activist who also served as an advisor to President Andrzej Duda. His son, Kacper, obtained legal education and was active in local government as a PiS councillor in Otwock. From 2018 to 2023, Kacper was employed at the World Bank, having been recommended for the position by the National Bank of Poland. Kamiński later married Barbara, who graduated in law from Maria Curie-Skłodowska University in Lublin and has been practicing as an advocate in Warsaw since 2004. In 2021, Barbara was appointed as a judge in the Piaseczno District Court by the National Council of the Judiciary.

He is also one of the few members of the conservative Law and Justice Party who is publicly an atheist. Despite this, in 2019, when he was sworn in as the Minister of the Interior and Administration, he added the phrase "so help me God" to the words of his oath.

== Awards ==
Commander's Cross of the Order of Polonia Restituta

== See also ==
- Members of Polish Sejm 2005–2007
