= Tadeusz Hołuj =

Polish poet, writer, publicist and politician

- Image of Hołuj from the Rzeszowska Trybuna Robotnicza newspaper, 1948
- Born: 1916; Kraków, Kingdom of Galicia and Lodomeria, Austria-Hungary
- Died: 1985 (aged 68–69); Kraków, Kraków Voivodeship, Polish People's Republic
- Resting place: Rakowice Cemetery
- Writing career
- Language: Polish
- WWII
- Allegiance: Polish government-in-exile
- Branch: ZWZ; GBO
- Service years: 1939-45
- Battles: Polish Defensive War

Tadeusz Hołuj (Polish pronunciation: [taˈdɛ.uʂ ˈxɔwuj]; 1916 in Kraków – 1985 in Kraków) was a Polish poet, writer, publicist and politician.

== Biography ==
Prioir to World War II, Hołuj published poems, and co-edited a literary magazine. During World War II, he joined the Polish resistance (the Union of Armed Struggle), was arrested by the Germans and imprisoned in the Auschwitz concentration camp, where he subsequently joined the camp's resistance.

After the war, Hołuj joined the Polish United Workers' Party. He was a deputy to the Sejm from 1972 to 1980. From 1965 he was a secretary general of the International Auschwitz Committee. He also wrote novels about the early socialist movement in Poland and about his camp experiences.

He was the first president of the Kuźnica association.
