= Alfred Klahr =

Austrian communist politician and theorist

- Born: 16 September 1904; Vienna, Austria-Hungary
- Died: 1944 (aged 39–40); Warsaw, General Government
- Citizenship: Austria
- Known for: Theory of Austrian Nation
- Political party: Communist Party of Austria
- Parent: Salman Klahr

Alfred Klahr (16 September 1904 – 1944) was an Austrian communist politician, journalist and historian. He was a leading Marxist intellectual and theorist in the First Austrian Republic.

== Biography ==
Alfred Klahr was born on 16 September 1904 in Vienna. His father Salman Klahr worked as hazzan in Israelitische Kultusgemeinde Wien. Becoming a student at the University of Vienna, Alfred Klahr joined the Kommunistischen Jugendverband. From 1930 Klahr lived in Moscow and worked as representative of the Communist Youth Union of Austria. From 1935 to 1937 he taught in Austrian section of International Lenin School. In 1937 Klahr turned to Prague and worked in communist newspaper Weg und Ziel. From 1938 - after Anschluss and annexation of Czechoslovakia - Alfred Klahr was active in anti-Nazi Austrian Resistance. From August 1942 he was detained in Auschwitz concentration camp (as Ludwig Lokmanis, prisoner number 58933). He was member of Kampfgruppe Auschwitz. 15 June 1944 Alfred Klahr (together with Polish communist, PPR member, Stefan Bratkowski) managed to escape, but he died afterward, shot by the SS in Nazi-occupied Warsaw.

== Klahr's theory of the national question in Austria ==
In March and April 1937 Klahr published the series of articles titled Zur nationalen Frage in Österreich. In these texts he explain how the Austria emerged from the German part of Europe to take another political direction.

"The view that the Austrian people are a part of the German nation is theoretically unfounded. A union of the German nation, in which also the Austrians are included, never existed and does not exist today either. The Austrian people have lived under different economic and political conditions than the remaining Germans in the "Reich", and have therefore chosen another national development. How far this process of a national development is, and/or how close the connections from the common descent and common language are, only a concrete investigation of its history can answer that."

— Alfred Klahr (under his pseudonym "Rudolf"), after being asked in 1936 by the communist leadership in exile in Prague if the theoretical notion of an independent Austrian nation separate from Germany existed.

This permitted him to understand the conflict between the clerical Austrofascism and the Pan-German Nazism, each being expression of different social classes.

In Auschwitz Klahr wrote the famous Auschwitz text, as a result of debates by Austrian and German communists detained in Auschwitz.

== See also ==
- Communist Party of Austria
- Marxism and the National Question
- German Question
- German nationalism in Austria
- Austrofascism
