= Jan Kanthak =

Polish politician (born 1991)

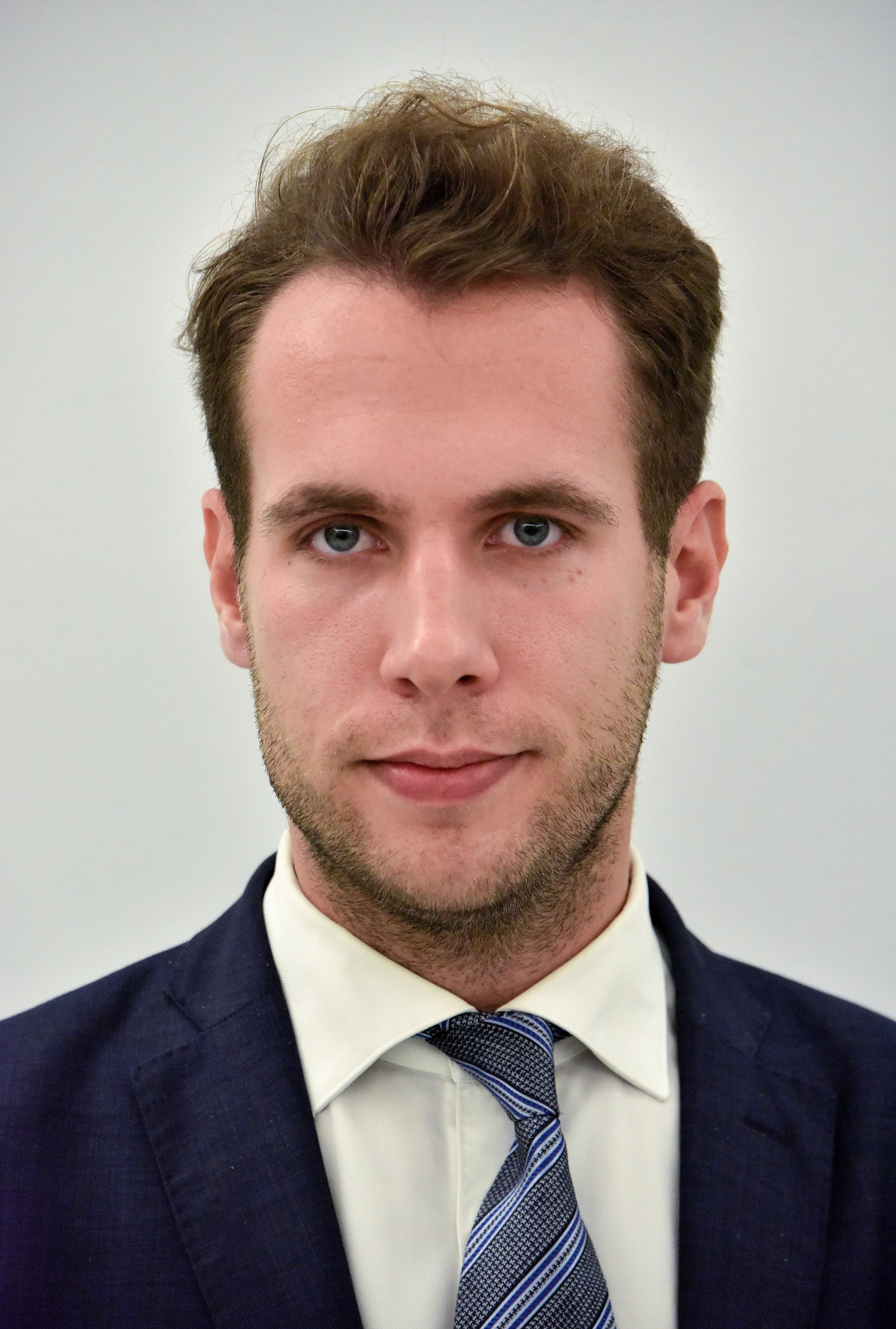
- Kanthak in 2019

Member of the Sejm
- Incumbent
- Assumed office 12 November 2019
- Constituency: Lublin

Personal details
- Born: 20 September 1991 (age 34)
- Party: Law and Justice (since 2024)
- Other political affiliations: Sovereign Poland (2019–2024)
- Parent: Andrzej Kanthak (father)

Jan Kanthak (born 20 September 1991) is a Polish politician serving as a member of the Sejm since 2019. He is the son of Andrzej Kanthak.
