= Jerzy Wiatr =

Polish politician

Jerzy Józef Wiatr (born 17 September 1931 in Warsaw) is a Polish sociologist, political scientist and politician. H has been a professor of the University of Warsaw, He was the rector of the European School of Law and Administration, a private tertiary education institution in Warsaw. A former member of the Polish United Workers' Party, he supported the party's line in communist-era Poland. In the post-communist period, he has been a member of the social democratic party Democratic Left Alliance, and deputy to the Sejm from 1991 to 1997. He was the Minister of National Education from 1996–1997. Received the Commander's Cross with Star of the Polonia Restituta order in 1996.

== Works ==
- Naród i państwo: socjologiczne problemy kwestii narodowej (KiW, 1969)
- Socjologia stosunków politycznych (PWN, 1977)
- Społeczeństwo. Wstęp do socjologii systematycznej (PWN, 1979)
- Drogi do wolności: polityczne mechanizmy rozwoju krajów postkolonialnych (IPM-L KC PZPR, 1982)
- Socjologia wojska (MON, 1982)
- Marksistowska teoria rozwoju społecznego (PWN, 1983)
- Marksizm i polityka (Biblioteka Studiów nad Marksizmem, KiW, 1987)
- Socjologia wielkiej przemiany (KAP, 1999)
- Socjaldemokracja wobec wyzwań XXI wieku (Scholar, 2000)
- Socjologia polityki (Scholar, 2002)
- Refleksje o polskim interesie narodowym (IFiS PAN, 2004)
- Europa pokomunistyczna – przemiany państw i społeczeństw po 1989 roku (Scholar, 2006)

=== Edited works ===
- Between Animosity and Utility. Political Partries and Their Matrix. Warszawa: Wydawnictwo Naukowe Scholar. 2000. Co-edited with Hieronim Kubiak.
