= Jacek Czerniak =

Polish politician

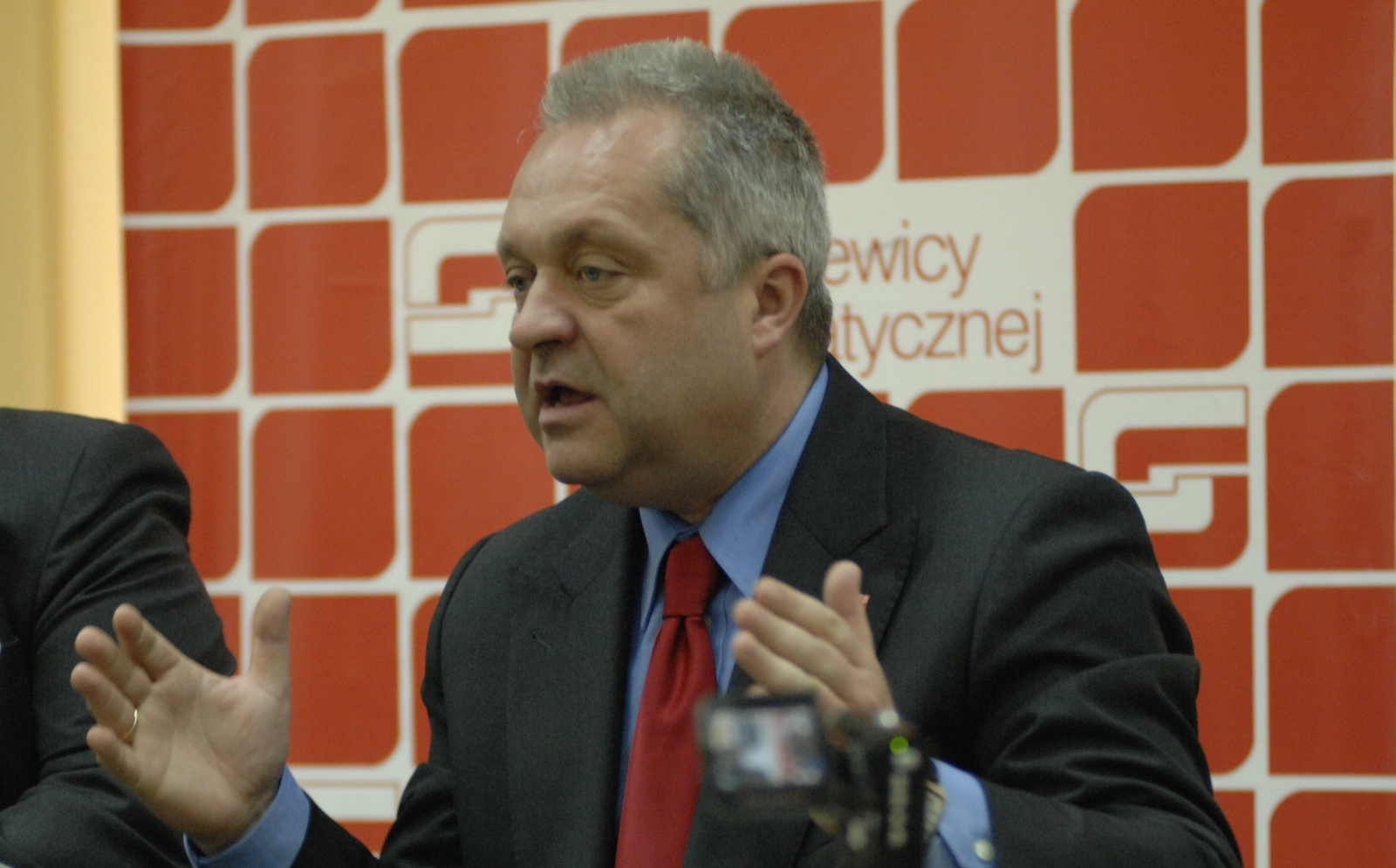

Member of the Sejm, VII, IX, and X terms
- In office 8 November 2011 – 11 November 2015
- Incumbent
- Assumed office 12 November 2019

Personal details
- Born: 30 August 1964 (age 61) Świdnik, Poland
- Party: New Left

Jacek Czerniak (born 30 August 1964) is a Polish politician and political scientist. Member of the Sejm representing Democratic Left Alliance (SLD) and the New Left (after SLD merged with Spring into a new party in 2021).

== Electoral history ==
Sejm
Election	Party	Votes	%	Constituency	Elected?
2011	Democratic Left Alliance	5,965	1.3	Lublin	Yes
2015	United Left	6,017	1.23	Lublin	No
2019	Democratic Left Alliance	17,720	3.13	Lublin	Yes
