= Michał Moskal =

Polish politician (born 1994)

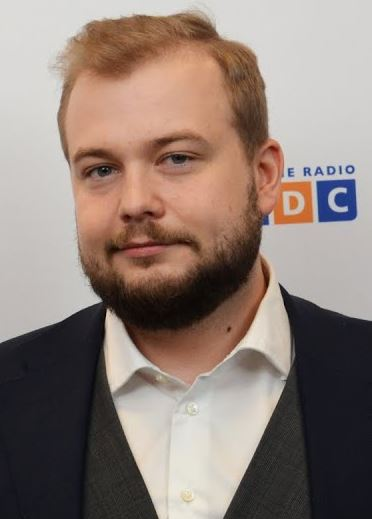

Member of the Sejm
- Incumbent
- Assumed office 13 November 2023
- Constituency: Lublin

Personal details
- Born: 6 May 1994 (age 31)
- Party: Law and Justice

Michał Moskal (born 6 May 1994) is a Polish politician of Law and Justice. In the 2023 parliamentary election, he was elected member of the Sejm. Since 2020, he has served as chairman of the party's youth wing Law and Justice Youth Forum.
