= Bartłomiej Pejo =

Polish politician (born 1985)

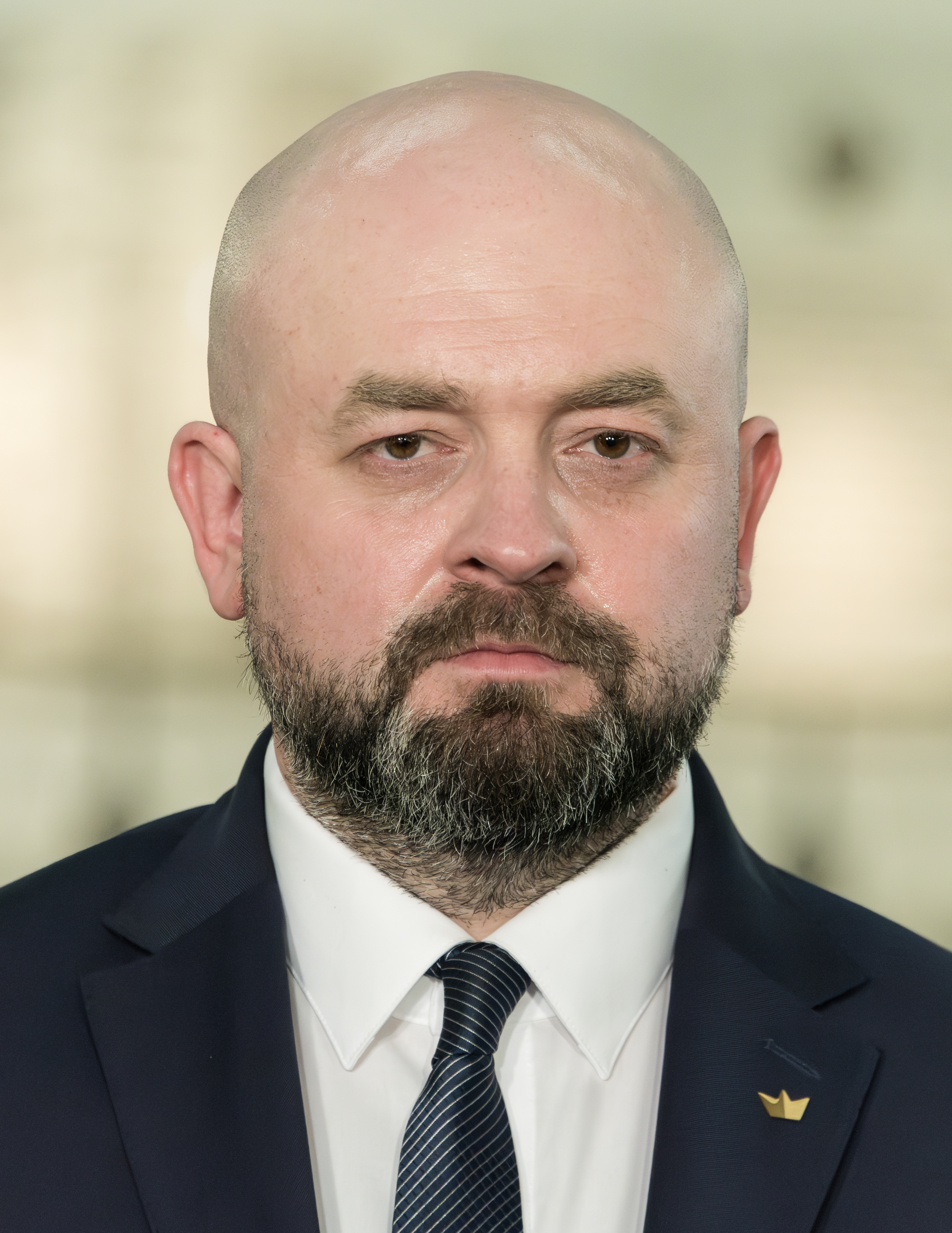
- Pejo in 2023

Member of the Sejm
- Incumbent
- Assumed office 13 November 2023
- Constituency: Lublin

Personal details
- Born: 4 April 1985 (age 41) Świdnik, Poland
- Party: New Hope
- Other political affiliations: Confederation Liberty and Independence
- Relatives: Janusz Korwin-Mikke (father-in-law)

Bartłomiej Pejo (born 4 April 1985) is a Polish politician serving as a member of the Sejm since 2023 representing the Lublin constituency.

== Biography ==
Pejo was born in Świdnik and attended the Stanisław Staszic High School in Lublin. He also attended the Main School of Fire Services in Warsaw from which he first graduated in 2009 with the professional title of engineer and then later in 2011 with a master's degree.

== Personal life ==
He is the son-in-law of Janusz Korwin-Mikke, the founder of the New Hope party through his marriage to Korynna Korwin-Mikke.
