= Paweł Sękowski =

Polish historian (born 1985)

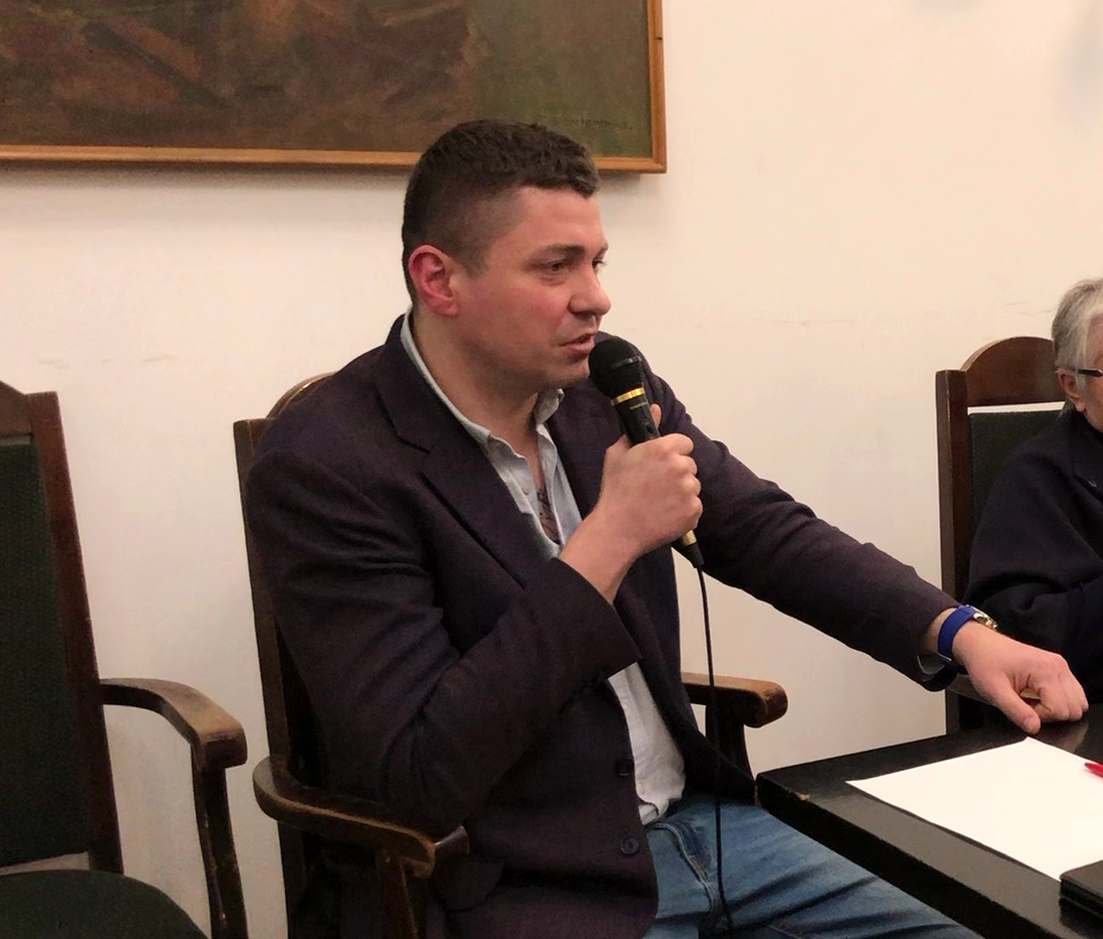
- Born: 1985 (age 40–41); Lublin, Lublin Voivodeship, Poland
- Occupation: Historian

Academic background
- Education: Jagiellonian University; Sorbonne
- Thesis: Polacy we Francji w pierwszych latach po drugiej wojnie światowej (1944-1949) (2015)
- Academic advisors: Wojciech Rojek; Oivier Forcade

Academic work
- Discipline: History
- Sub-discipline: Modern history
- Website: Pawel Sekowski publications on Academia.edu

Paweł Sękowski (born 1985) is a Polish historian specializing in modern history, researcher at the Jagiellonian University, President of the Kuźnica association from January 2018.

== Biography ==
In 2009 he graduated from history studies at the Jagiellonian University. He was a scholarship holder of the Socrates-Erasmus program at the Université Jean Moulin Lyon 3 (2007–2008) and a scholarship holder of the Government of the French Republic (2010–2012).

In 2015, he obtained the degree of doctor of humanities upon the thesis on Polish emigration in France between 1944 and 1949, supervised by Wojciech Rojek and Oivier Forcade. He defended his thesis in French at the Sorbonne, and in Polish at the Jagiellonian University.

His research interests include the social and political history of Poland and France in the 20th century, the history and sociology of immigration, and the history of refugees.

He is a member of the Polish Historical Society, Groupe interdisciplinaire de recherché Allemagne-France, and the Global Studies Research Network.

In 2018, he was elected the President of Kuźnica, replacing Andrzej Kurz in this position. From 2018, he also acts as the vice-chairman of the Polish Teachers' Union at the Jagiellonian University.

== Works ==
- Polskie Stronnictwo Ludowe w Krakowie i powiecie krakowskim w latach 1945–1949, Institute of National Remembrance, 2011;
- Les Polonais en France au lendemain de la Seconde Guerre mondiale (1944–1949). Histoire d’une intégration, Sorbonne Université Presses, 2019;
- Imigranci polscy we Francji, 1939–1949: Historia integracji społeczności osiadłej przed drugą wojną światową we Francji, Institute of National Remembrance, 2019.

== Awards ==
- First Award in the Władysław Pobóg-Malinowski Competition for the best historical debut (masters thesis) awarded by the Institute of History of the Polish Academy of Sciences and the Institute of National Remembrance, 2010;
- Distinction in the Władysław Pobóg-Malinowski Competition for the best historical debut (doctoral thesis) awarded by the Institute of History of the Polish Academy of Sciences and the Institute of National Remembrance, 2016.
