= Adam Burakowski =

Polish politician

Adam W. Burakowski Ph.D.
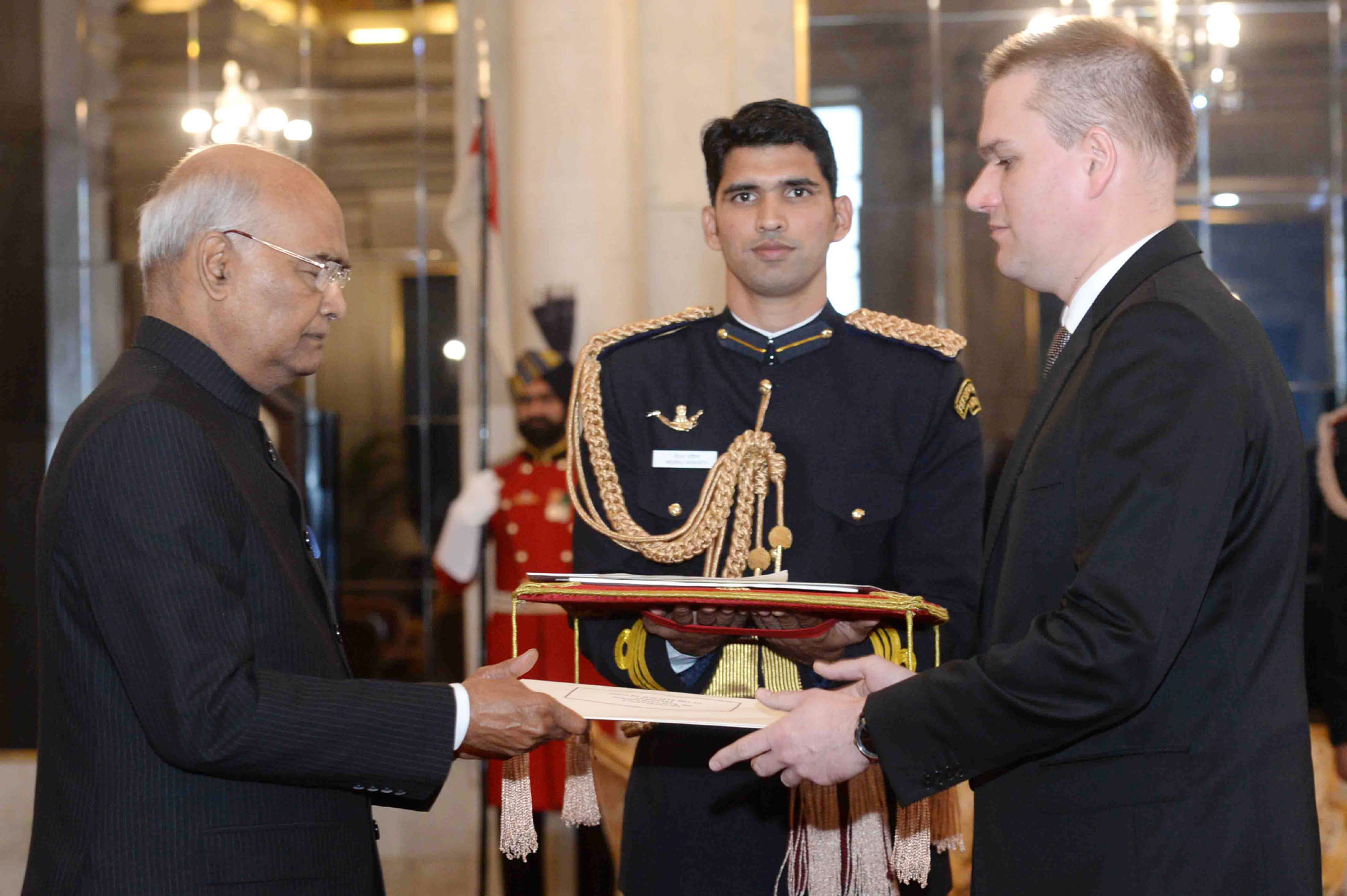
- Ram Nath Kovind and Adam Burakowski

Poland Ambassador to India
- In office December 2017 – 3 April 2023
- Preceded by: Tomasz Łukaszuk
- Succeeded by: Piotr Świtalski

Poland Ambassador to South Africa
- In office April 2023 – December 2024
- Preceded by: Andrzej Kanthak
- Succeeded by: Jacek Chodorowicz

Personal details
- Born: 26 July 1977 (age 49) Warsaw, Poland
- Education: University of Warsaw
- Profession: Diplomat, historian, political scientist

Adam Wojciech Burakowski (born 26 July 1977 in Warsaw) is a Polish diplomat, political scientist and historian, serving as an ambassador of Poland to South Africa (2023–2024) and India (2017–2023).

== Life ==
Adam Burakowski graduated from University of Warsaw Faculty of History (2001). In 2007 he defended his PhD thesis on Nicolae Ceaușescu (supervised by Andrzej Paczkowski) and, in 2015, habilitation on politics of Romania. He is the professor of the Institute of Political Studies of the Polish Academy of Sciences. Graduate of the Maharaja Jam Saheb Digvijay Sinhji High School.

From 2006 to 2017 he worked for the national broadcaster Polskie Radio, holding various positions related to the international affairs. He was a Polish representative to the European Broadcasting Union. Simultaneously, he was involved in the Euranet. At that time he has been cooperating with Centre for European Studies of Jawaharlal Nehru University, Universitatea Babeș-Bolyai Cluj-Napoca, Masaryk University in Brno.

In December 2017 he became the Republic of Poland Ambassador to India. He was accredited to six other countries: Afghanistan, Bangladesh, Bhutan, Maldives, Nepal, Sri Lanka. He ended his term in New Delhi on 31 March 2023.

On 13 April 2023, he took the post of the Ambassador to South Africa, additionally accredited to Botswana, Namibia, Mozambique, Zimbabwe, Zambia, Lesotho and Eswatini. He ended his term in December 2024.

He speaks English, Hindi, Romanian and Russian. He is married and has four children.

== Works ==
- Europeizacja partii politycznych i grup interesu w krajach Partnerstwa Wschodniego i kandydujących do Unii Europejskiej, Warszawa, 2015 (with Jakub Wódka and Agnieszka K. Cianciara).
- System polityczny współczesnej Rumunii, Warszawa 2014
- Indie: od kolonii do mocarstwa 1857–2013, Warszawa, 2013 (with Krzysztof Iwanek)
- Geniusz Karpat. Dyktatura Nicolae Ceaușescu 1965–1989, Warszawa 2009
- 1989 – Jesień Narodów, Warszawa 2010 (with Aleksander Gubrynowicz, Paweł Ukielski)
- Kraj smutny pełen humoru. Dzieje Rumunii po 1989 roku, Warszawa 2012 (with Marius Stan)
- System polityczny współczesnej Rumunii, Warszawa-Kraków 2014
