= Kazimierz Choma =

Polish politician

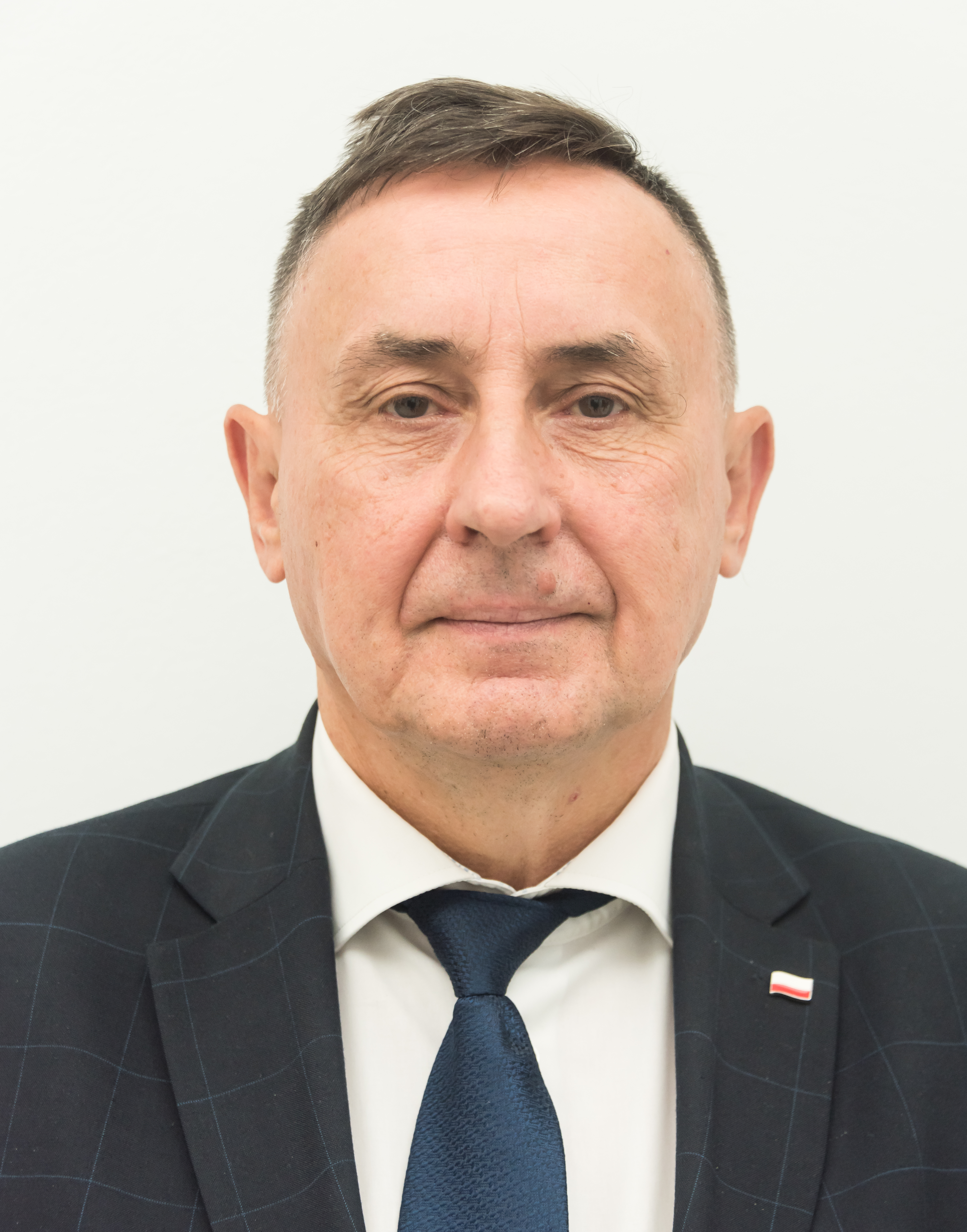
- Kazimierz Choma (2022)

Member of the Sejm (9th and 10th term)

Personal details
- Born: December 16, 1957 (age 68) Kraśnik
- Party: Law and Justice
- Education: AGH University of Science and Technology
- Occupation: Politician, local government official, civil servant

Kazimierz Bogusław Choma (born December 16, 1957, in Kraśnik) is a Polish politician, local government official, and civil servant, a member of parliament (MP) in the 9th and 10th terms of the Sejm.

== Career ==
He graduated in metallurgy from the AGH University of Science and Technology. He also studied business management at the Wyższa Szkoła Biznesu – National-Louis University and real estate appraisal at the Warsaw Management School. He worked for over 20 years at the FŁT-Kraśnik and later operated in private companies. He became the president of the Kraśnik Housing Company. In 2016, he became the director of the Lublin branch of the Agricultural Property Agency (and after its transformation, the director of the branch of the National Support Centre for Agriculture). He became involved in political activities within the Law and Justice party. In 2010, he unsuccessfully ran for the Kraśnik County Council, winning a mandate in the elections four years later. In 2018, he ran for mayor of Kraśnik, losing in the second round to Wojciech Wilk (he received 46.61% of the votes). In these elections, he won a seat in the Kraśnik City Council and became its vice-chairman. In the 2019 parliamentary elections, he was elected to the Sejm in the Lublin district (he received 13,777 votes). In the 2023 elections, he successfully sought re-election (receiving 8,363 votes).
