= Hieronim Kubiak =

Polish sociologist and politician (1934–2024)

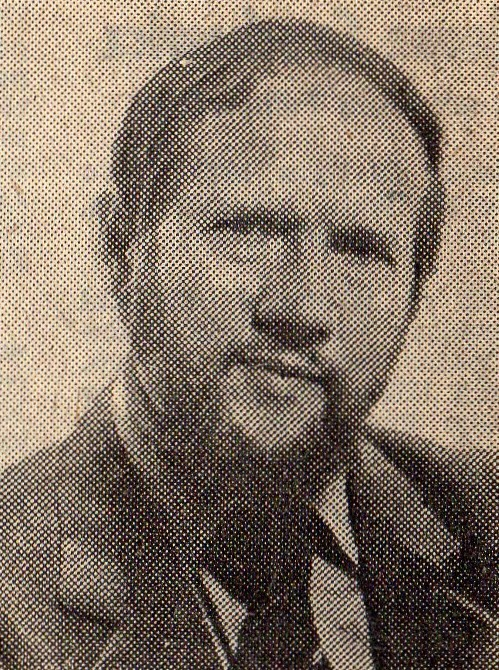
- Born: 30 September 1934; Ruda Pabianicka
- Died: 21 April 2024 (aged 89)
- Occupations: Sociologist, politician

Academic background
- Education: Jagiellonian University
- Doctoral advisor: Kazimierz Dobrowolski

Academic work
- Discipline: Sociology

Hieronim Eugeniusz Kubiak (30 September 1934 – 21 April 2024) was a sociologist, politician and professor at the Jagiellonian University.

== Biography ==
He came from the working class family; he was the son of Marian and Genowefa. In 1953 he joined Polish United Workers' Party (PZPR). He was a graduate of Russian philology (1956) and sociology (1964) from the Jagiellonian University. He was an activist and chairman of the Kraków Branch of the Polish Students' Association (ZSP); later he became its honorary member. He defended his doctoral thesis in 1968 under the supervision of Kazimierz Dobrowolski. In 1972 he obtained habilitation.

From 1971 to 1972 he was an advisor to Deputy Prime Minister Wincenty Kraśko. In the academic year 1976/1977 he stayed in the USA as a scholarship holder of the Fulbright. In 1976 he was the initiator of the Institute for Polish Diaspora Research of the Jagiellonian University in Przegorzały (Instytut Badań Polonijnych UJ w Przegorzałach), and was its director between 1976–1981 and 1987–1991. He was creator and editor of the journal Przegląd Polonijny, issued from 1975.

His research interests included nation, religion, Polish diaspora (including Poles in the United States), as well as peace and conflicts between different groups and political sociology. He supervised 18 doctoral dissertations and more than 500 master's dissertations.

He was a secretary of the Central Committee of the Polish United Workers' Party from 1981 to 1982 and a member of the Central Committee Politburo from 1981 to 1986.

From 1982, he served as Chairman of the Scientific Council of the Institute of Fundamental Problems of Marxism-Leninism.

He took part in the Round Table talks on the government side. He was a co-founder and, from 1989 to 1993, president of the Kuźnica association. He had a dog called Maciuś.

His remainings were buried at the Rakowicki Cemetery.

== Works ==
- Polski Narodowy Kościół Katolicki w Stanach Zjednoczonych Ameryki w latach 1897–1965. Jego społeczne uwarunkowania i społeczne funkcje. Wrocław. 1970.
- Religijność a środowisko społeczne: studium zmian religijności pod wpływem ruchów migracyjnych ze wsi do miasta. Zakład Narodowy imienia Ossolińskich, Wydawnictwo Polskiej Akademii Nauk. 1972.
- "Gazeta Krakowska" w opiniach swych czytelników. Kraków: Uniwersytet Jagielloński. Instytut Socjologii. 1973.
- Oczekiwania i dążenia mieszkańców regionu krakowskiego w świetle listów do "Gazety Krakowskiej": analiza socjologiczna. Kraków. 1974.
- Rodowód narodu amerykańskiego. Kraków: Wydawnictwo Literackie. 1975.
- The Polish National Catholic Church in the United States of America from 1897–1980. Wydawnictwo Naukowe PWN. 1982.
- Poszukiwania. Warszawa: Książka i Wiedza. 1987.
- Zanikające pokrewieństwo. Szkice socjologiczne o Polonii. Wydawnictwo Literackie. 1990.
- U progu ery postwestfalskiej. Szkice z teorii narodu. Universitas. 2007.

=== Edited works ===
- Założenia teorii asymilacji. Polska AN, „Ossolineum”. 1980. Co-edited with Andrzej Paluch.
- Polonia amerykańska. Przeszłość i współczesność. Zakład Narodowy imienia Ossolińskich, Wydawnictwo Naukowe PAN. 1988. Co-edited with Eugeniusz Kusielewicz and Tadeusz Gromada.
- Mniejszości polskie i Polonia w ZSRR. Ossolineum, Wydawnictwo PAN. 1992. Co-edited with Tadeusz Paleczny, Jarosław Rokicki and M. Wawrykiewicz.
- Partie polityczne w wielkim mieście. Kraków: Instytut Socjologii Uniwersytetu Jagiellońskiego. 1998.
- Between Animosity and Utility. Political Partries and Their Matrix. Warszawa: Wydawnictwo Naukowe Scholar. 2000. Co-edited with Jerzy J. Wiatr.

== Awards ==
- Jubilee Medal "Forty Years of Victory in the Great Patriotic War 1941–1945" (1985)
- Commander's Cross with Star of the Order of Polonia Restituta (2002)
- Kowadło, awarded by the Kuźnica association (2012)

== Bibliography ==
- Kto jest kim w Polsce. Informator biograficzny. Warszawa: Wydawnictwo Interpress. 1989. pp. 650–651.
