= Leszek Augustyn =

Polish philosopher, historian of philosophy (born 1971)

- Born: 1971 (age 54–55)
- Occupations: philosopher, historian of philosophy

Leszek Roman Augustyn (born 1971) is a philosopher, historian of philosophy, professor at the Jagiellonian University.

== Biography ==
In 1996, he completed his master's degree in religious studies and in 1998, his master's degree in philosophy at the Jagiellonian University. In 2003, he earned a doctorate in humanities from the Jagiellonian University based on his thesis Projekt realizmu absolutnego. Problematyka ontologicznych podstaw religii i życia społecznego w filozofii Siemiona L. Franka (The Project of Absolute Realism: The Problems of the Ontological Foundations of Religion and Social Life in the Philosophy of Semyon L. Frank), supervised by Włodzimierz Andrzej Rydzewski. In 2013, he earned his habilitation in the humanities based on his thesis Wolność w jedności. Borys Wyszesławcew i rosyjska filozofia sobornosti (Freedom in Unity: Boris Vysheslavtsev and the Russian Philosophy of Sobornost).

His research interests include the history of modern philosophy, the history of ideas, Russian philosophy, Polish philosophy, and the philosophy of religion. At the Jagiellonian University, he taught courses on topics including the history of Marxism. He has published in journals such as Teologia Polityczna.

== Books ==
=== Monography ===
- Wolność w jedności. Borys Wyszesławcew i rosyjska filozofia sobornosti. Jagiellońskie Studia z Filozofii Rosyjskiej. Wydawnictwo Uniwersytetu Jagiellońskiego. 2012.

=== Edition ===
- Granice Europy, granice filozofii. Jagiellońskie Studia z Filozofii Rosyjskiej. Vol. 13. Włodzimierz Rydzewski (co-editor). Wydawnictwo Uniwersytetu Jagiellońskiego. 2007.
