= Andrzej Kanthak =

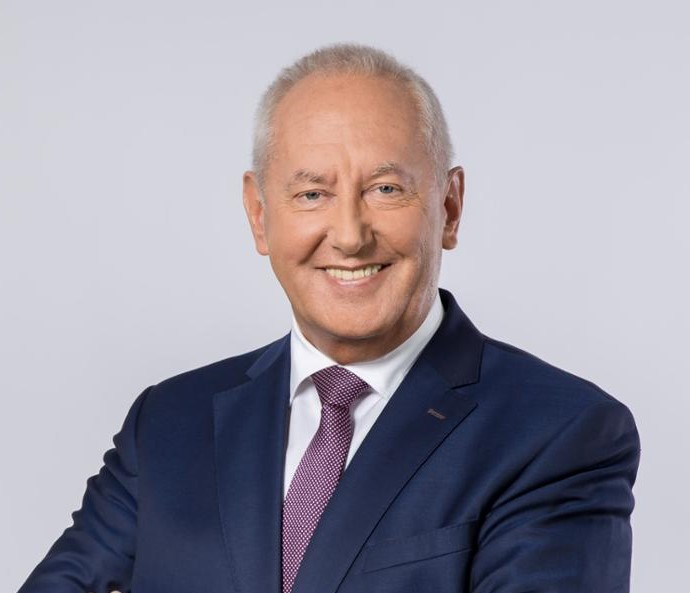

6th Poland Ambassador to South Africa
- In office February 2017 – 31 March 2023
- Preceded by: Anna Raduchowska-Brochwicz
- Succeeded by: Adam Burakowski

Personal details
- Born: 30 November 1953 (age 72) Wąbrzeźno
- Spouse: Hanna Cygler
- Children: Jan Kanthak
- Education: Poznań University of Technology
- Profession: Diplomat Ambassador

Andrzej Józef Kanthak (born 30 November 1953, Wąbrzeźno) is a Polish diplomat and senior executive; Ambassador of Poland to South Africa between 2017 and 2023.

Andrzej Kanthak has graduated from the Faculty of Civil Engineering at the Poznań University of Technology. After graduation he has been living in Gdańsk. He worked for ten years as a shipbuilding engineer in various managerial positions. Since 1991 until February 2017 he served as the CEO of consulting company ABC Consulting Ltd. In 1995-96 he held a position as the president of the National Investment Fund in Poland. He served both as a chairman and as a member of the supervisory boards of several public companies. Since 1991-2016 a board member of the Foundation Theatrum Gedanense, an organisation under the honorary patronage of the Prince of Wales. Between 2006 and 2007 he was the President of the governmental agency Polish Investment and Information Agency (PAIiIZ).

From 1994 until 2016 he served as the honorary consul of the United Kingdom in Gdańsk. Between 2000 and 2010 he served as the president of the Association of Honorary Consuls in Poland. He was also the director of the British Chamber of Commerce in Gdańsk (1995–1998).

From 2017 to 2023 Andrzej Kanthak was serving as Ambassador of Poland to South Africa, Botswana, Lesotho, Mozambique, Namibia, Eswatini, Zambia and Zimbabwe.

He is fluent in English and to some degree, German and Russian language.

He is married to Anna Kanthak (pen-name Hanna Cygler), they have one son Jan Kanthak, MP.
