= Bruno Baum =

German political party official and anti-Nazi resistance fighter (1910–1971)

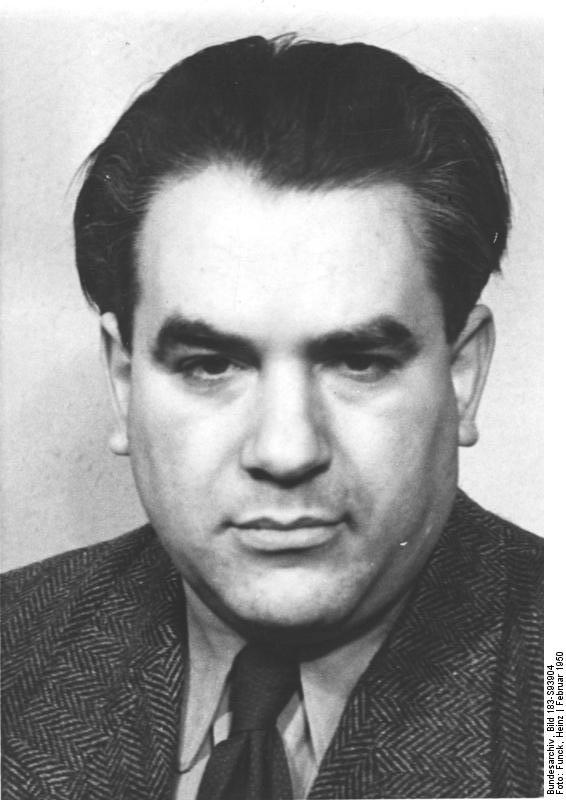
- Baum in 1950
- Born: Bruno Baum; 13 February 1910; Potsdam, German Empire
- Died: 13 December 1971 (aged 61)

Bruno Baum (13 February 1910 – 13 December 1971) was a German official for the Communist Party of Germany and Socialist Unity Party of Germany. He also served as a resistance fighter during World War II.

== Life ==
Baum was born in Potsdam, then part of the German Empire. From 1916 to 1924, he attended a Jewish boys' school in Berlin. In 1926, he joined the Young Communist League of Germany and the Red Youth Front. In 1927 he became a member of the Communist Party of Germany. The following year, he renounced his Jewish faith and attended the Rosa Luxemburg Party School in Dresden. After a brief stint as an electrician, he became a member of the German Metal Workers' Union. In 1929, he became a member of the Roter Frontkämpferbund (RFB) and sub-district manager and head of the Red Youth Front Berlin-Brandenburg. Repeatedly detained, he was sentenced to one month in prison in 1931 for continuing the RFB.

Between 1933 and 1934, he was head of the KJVD-UB Berlin-Friedrichshain and an instructor at Siemens. From the end of 1934, he attended the International Lenin School in Moscow for a year and then worked illegally under the code names Fritz Anders and Walter Schwarz together with Gerhard Rolack, Erich Honecker and Kurt Hager.

== Prison and Resistance ==
On December 4, 1935, Baum was arrested together with Honecker and Edwin Lautenbach. Baum spent 18 months in custody in Plötzensee. He was then sentenced to 13 years in prison for treason. From 1937 to 1943, Baum was imprisoned in Brandenburg-Görden Prison and then transferred to Auschwitz. In the summer of 1944, Baum joined Ernst Burger, who was preparing his escape, to head the so-called Kampfgruppe Auschwitz. Other members included Józef Cyrankiewicz, Heinrich Dürmayer, and Ludwig Soswinski.

Through contact with Poland made by Witold Pilecki, who sent shortwaves from the camp to Kraków and London, the group transmitted messages to the Allied Forces. However, these were only used for propaganda purposes by the Allies when the second front was opened on June 6, 1944 (D-Day). The group formed an "editorial committee" consisting of Arpad Haasz and Otto Heller. Baum edited the articles and passed them onto Cyrankiewicz.

On January 18, 1945, the Auschwitz concentration camp was “evacuated” and Baum was taken to the Mauthausen concentration camp. On May 5, 1945, Baum was liberated by US troops.

== GDR ==
From 1945 to 1949, Baum was secretary for Culture and Education of the KPD and employee of the Council of Ministers of East Germany. From 1946 to 1951, he was a member of the state leadership of the KPD and, after the forced Merger of the KPD and SPD into the Socialist Unity Party of Germany (SED) on April 22, 1946, a member of the Berlin SED state leadership. From 1949, he was city councillor for economy of the city administration of East Berlin. In 1951, he became secretary of the SED district management in Greater Berlin and remained in this position until 1959. As a party official of the German Democratic Republic, Baum was involved in the planning of Karl-Marx-Allee in Berlin in 1952. The jury favored the design Egon Hartmann.

In the spring of 1953, after the death of Josef Stalin and in preparation for Walter Ulbricht's 60th birthday, Baum called for a "voluntary" increase in the labor standard by 10% while reducing real wages by 30%. Although on June 14 Neues Deutschland called for the end of Baum's "mallet methods", the SED complied. Baum classified every protest as “hostile to the working class." Three days later, the East German uprising of 1953 occurred.

In 1957 Baum became a member of the People's Chamber and the following year Socialist Unity Party of Germany Central Committee of the SED. Baum was a member of the Central Committee until his death. From March 1959 to June 1960 he acted as division head in the Ministry for Inner German Trade, Foreign Trade and Material Supply (MAI) and from July 1960 as a member of the SED district management District Potsdam. Until 1963, Baum studied electrical engineering at the engineering college for power engineering in Velten.

In 1964, he became a member of the reorganized International Federation of Resistance Fighters – Association of Anti-Fascists. Baum died in Potsdam at the age of 61.
