= European School of Law and Administration =

Private university in Warsaw, Poland

Coordinates: 52.2592°N 21.0495°E

European University of Law and Administration (EULA University)
- Europejska Wyższa Szkoła; Prawa i Administracji (EWSPA)
- Type: non-public college
- Established: 1997
- Affiliations: Socrates-Erasmus
- Rector: Dariusz Czajka
- Students: 2,300 (November 2005)
- Location: Ogrodowa 58 , 00-876, Warsaw, Poland
- Website: ESLA University website

European University of Law and Administration (EULA) (Polish: Europejska Wyższa Szkoła Prawa i Administracji (EWSPA)) established in Warsaw (Poland, EU) is a private Polish University founded in 1997.

The EULA is affiliated with the Institute of Legal Studies of the Polish Academy of Sciences.

The EULA was founded by the Warsaw Branch Office of the Polish Lawyers Union, in close cooperation with Institute of Legal Studies of the Polish Academy of Sciences, and with the International Development Law Institute (IDLI) of Rome.

== School Authorities ==
- Honorary Rector: Jerzy Wiatr
- Rector: Dariusz Czajka
- Vice-rector: Tadeusz Szymanek
- Dean of the Faculty of Law in Warsaw: Barbara Bajor
- Vice-Dean of the Faculty of Law in Warsaw: Artur Kotowski
- Dean of the Faculty of Law in London: Waldemar Gontarski
- Vice-Dean of the Faculty of Law in London: Jakub Spurek
- Chancellor: Katarzyna Zajac

== Programs in English ==
- 3-year BA in International Relations

== Programs in Polish ==
- 5-year MA in Law
- 3-year BA in Administration
- 3-year BA in International Relations

== Location ==
The school's campus is located in the Wola district of Warsaw. The School also conducts classes in central Warsaw, London, and Brussels.

== Contact ==
- Address: 21/29 Grodzieńska str., Warsaw, Poland
- Phone: + 48 (22) 619 90 11, 619 24 90
- Coordinator of Foreign Student's Affairs: Marzena Kudyba
