= Clinic Klagenfurt am Woerthersee =

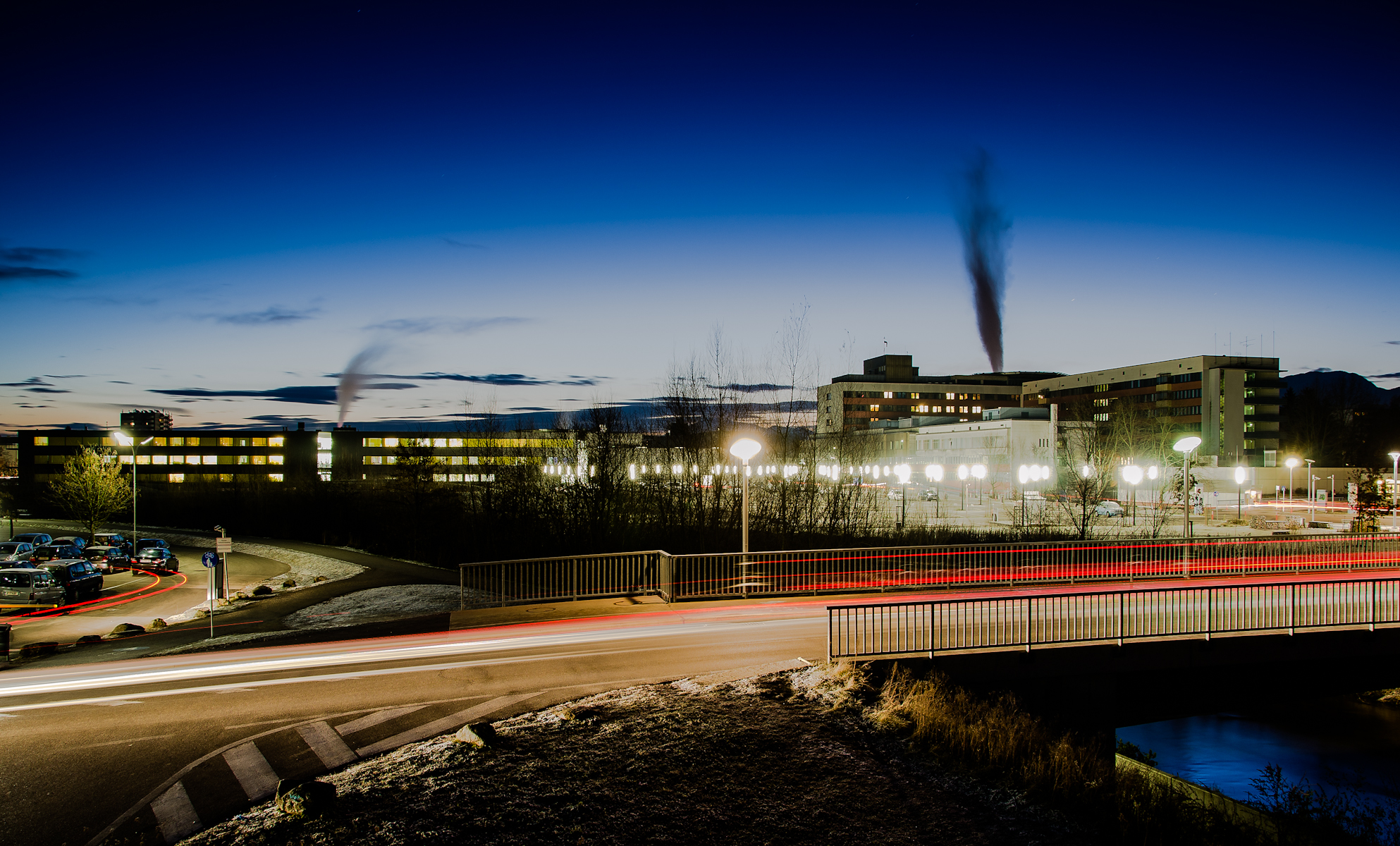

Geography
- Location: Feschnigstraße 11, 9020 Klagenfurt, Carinthia, Austria

Organisation
- Type: Teaching hospital

Services
- Beds: ~1,800

History
- Founded: 9 August 1896

Links
- Website: www.klinikum-klagenfurt.at

Clinic Klagenfurt am Woerthersee (German: Klagenfurt am Wörthersee) formerly LKH Klagenfurt, is a maximum care teaching hospital located in the Carinthian capital, Klagenfurt in Austria. With around 1,800 beds, roughly 62,000 inpatients per year and approximately 527,000 outpatient treatments, it is the third largest hospital in Austria.

The Klagenfurt am Wörthersee Clinic is certified in multiple medical specialities. It offers the range of services of a university clinic with the exception of transplant surgery. It has 25 clinical departments, five institutes and six clinical services. Particular attention is paid to interdisciplinary cooperation. For this purpose, all relevant disciplines can be found in one location.

== History ==
Klagenfurt Hospital was opened on 9 August 1896. State charities were newly built and opened at that time. These included the state hospital in Klagenfurt, the insane asylum, the children's hospital, the state hospital, the deaf and dumb and blind institution, the men's blind home and the state sick house.

During World War II the hospital was used by the Nazis to murder 700 to 900 patients. Antonie Pachner, the head nurse along with other nurses and the primary teacher of the men's department of the State Asylum Institute, Franz Niedermoser, administered lethal doses of sedatives to many patients. Four death transports to the Hartheim killing center between 1940 and 1941 caused the deaths of 733 people, including 25 children.

In 2019, the new medical directors, Dietmar Alberer and Elke Schindler, were focused on the construction of a new psychiatric facility.
