= Kuźnica (association) =

Left-wing organization in Kraków founded in 1975

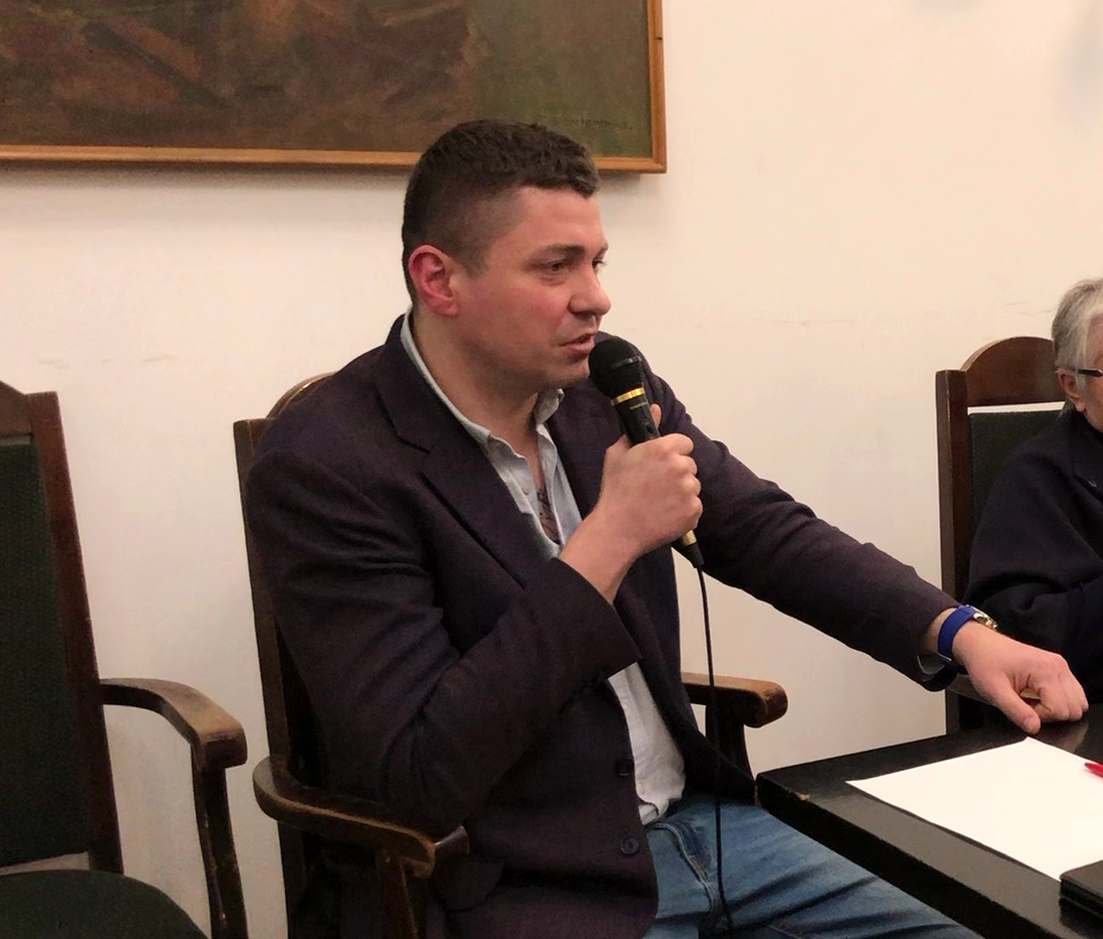
- Paweł Sękowski, the president of Kuźnica since 2018
- Formation: 1975
- Founded at: Kraków
- Type: association
- Headquarters: 44 Juliusz Słowacki Avenue
- Origins: Polish United Workers' Party
- Members: c. 300
- Official language: Polish
- Leader: Paweł Sękowski
- Key people: Ewa Wasil (secretary)
- Main organ: Prezes (President), Rada (Council), Komisja Rewizyjna (Audit Committee)
- Website: kuznica.org.pl
- KRS: 0000303748

Kuźnica is an association founded in 1975 in Kraków, bringing together over three hundred left-wing intellectuals, artists, and politicians. Branches of Kuźnica began operating in Warsaw, Nowy Sącz, Tarnów, Sosnowiec, and Zamość.

The subsequent presidents of Kuźnica were: Tadeusz Hołuj, Hieronim Kubiak, Andrzej Urbańczyk, Andrzej Kurz, Jerzy Hausner, Hieronim Kubiak again, Andrzej Kurz again, Paweł Sękowski (since January 2018). Other activists included Jan Güntner and Włodzimierz Rydzewski.

Since 1976, Kuźnica has been awarding the Kuźnica Anvil Award in recognition of the activities, achievements and works of the award winners. Since 1982, the press organ of Kuźnica, the magazine Zdanie, has been published.

Since 1992, Kuźnica has been based in premises at 41 Miodowa Street in Kazimierz. In 2018, Kuźnica received the Norbert Barlicki Local Government Award granted by the Rzeczpospolita Obywatelska Association.

On 29 May 2025, the fiftieth anniversary of Kuźnica was celebrated in the Krakow City Council Chamber.
