= Resistance movement in Auschwitz =

Underground resistance to the Holocaust in Auschwitz concentration camp

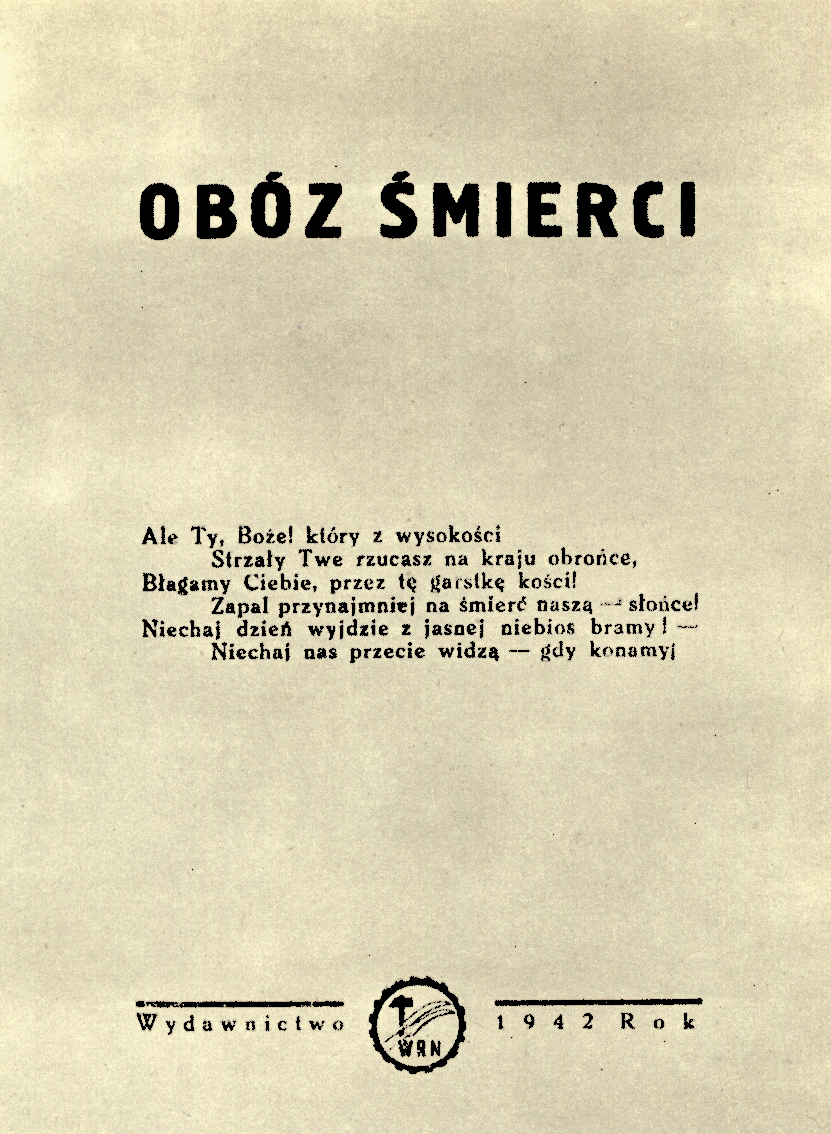
Conspiratorial reportage about Auschwitz "Camp of death" written by Natalia Zarembina in 1942.

The organization of underground resistance movements in Auschwitz concentration camp began in the second half of 1940, shortly after the camp became operational in May that year. In September 1940 Witold Pilecki, a Polish army captain, arrived in the camp. Using the name Tomasz Serafiński (prisoner number 4859), Pilecki had allowed himself to be captured by Germans in a street round up (łapanka) with the goal of having himself sent to Auschwitz to gather information and organize resistance inside. Under Pilecki's direction the Związek Organizacji Wojskowej (Union of Military Organization), ZOW, was formed.

== Background ==
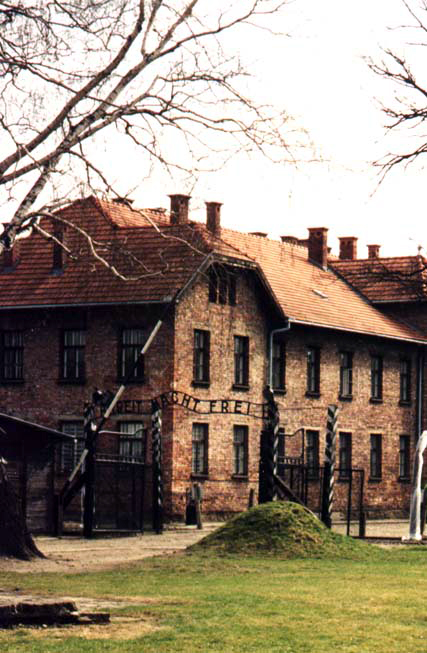
Main gate of Auschwitz I

After the western part of the country was annexed by Nazi Germany during the Nazi-Soviet invasion of Poland, Oświęcim (Auschwitz) was located administratively in the German Province of Upper Silesia, Regierungsbezirk Kattowitz. Auschwitz was first suggested as the location of a concentration camp for Polish nationals by SS-Oberführer Arpad Wigand, an aide to Higher SS and Police Leader for Silesia, Erich von dem Bach-Zelewski. Bach-Zelewski had been searching for a new site to intern people in the Silesia region because the local prisons were filled to capacity. Richard Glücks, head of the Concentration Camps Inspectorate, sent former Sachsenhausen concentration camp commandant Walter Eisfeld to inspect the site, which already held sixteen dilapidated one-story buildings that had once served as an Austrian and later Polish Army barracks.

Reichsführer-SS Heinrich Himmler, head of the Schutzstaffel (SS), approved the site in April 1940, intending to use the facility to house political prisoners. SS-Obersturmbannführer (lieutenant colonel) Rudolf Höss oversaw the development of the camp and served as the first commandant. SS-Obersturmführer (senior lieutenant) Josef Kramer was appointed Höss's deputy. Auschwitz I, the original camp, became the administrative center for the whole complex.

Auschwitz was the first concentration camp in south-western Poland under the German occupation. Similar structures were utilized to form Soldau concentration camp further north in the Province of East Prussia at the same time.

Sigmund Sobolewski 1992 - resistance at Auschwitz

In 1940 the number of former Polish soldiers and civilians sent to Auschwitz gave rise to suspicions about Germany's intent. Pilecki made a decision to place himself there willingly. On 19 September 1940 during a round-up in Żoliborz district of Warsaw, Pilecki was arrested and soon sent off to Auschwitz (prisoner no. 4859). Further proof that he entered the camp voluntarily came in the autumn of 1941 when Pilecki received a promotion to the rank of lieutenant from the Warsaw underground. Initially the resistance organization was composed of the Polish political prisoners and POWs – with former servicemen of the Polish Army playing a prominent role. In February 1942 Col. Kazimierz Heilman-Rawicz (in the camp hiding under the name Jan Hilkner) organized a cell of the Związek Walki Zbrojnej (Union of Armed Struggle), ZWZ.

At about the same time, imprisoned activists of the Polish Socialist Party (PPS), such as Stanisław Dubois, began forming their own organizations (Dubois was executed by the SS in 1942). Additionally, prisoners associated with the pre-war Polish right wing, like Jan Mosdorf and Roman Rybarski, also formed their own group. As the number of prisoners grew and the camp expanded, efforts were undertaken to unite the various Polish resistance movements within Auschwitz. This was achieved in 1942 when ZOW and other smaller groups formed a single organization associated with the Polish Home Army (Armia Krajowa, AK), the successor to ZWZ. The first commander of the larger group was Rawicz, representing ZWZ, who was transferred to Mauthausen concentration camp in 1942. The leadership was then taken over by Juliusz Gilewicz, who was killed in a mass execution in October 1943.

== International resistance ==
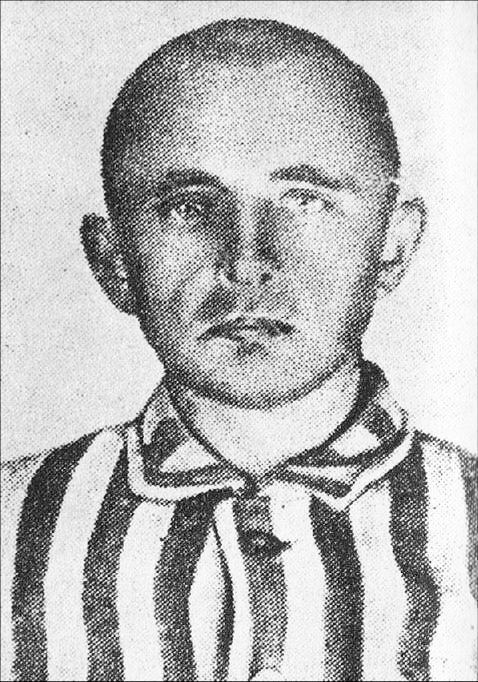
Stanisław Dubois, of the Polish Socialist Party, an organizer of one of the resistance groups in Auschwitz

By the end of 1942, with the camp now housing prisoners from all across Europe, other resistance cells appeared, usually formed along national and ethnic lines. In addition to a Jewish resistance group, there existed Czech, Russian, Yugoslav, French, Austrian and German ones, mostly with a leftist or socialist political bent. An international organization, Kampfgruppe Auschwitz (Auschwitz Combat Group), was created in 1943. In 1944, together with the Home Army, the Kampfgruppe set up an overall Auschwitz Military Council to coordinate resistance.

The main objectives of the resistance movements were to help prisoners survive, to collect intelligence on Nazi atrocities in the camps, to organize escapes, and to prepare for an eventual uprising within the camp. The last of these never materialized, although several mass mutinies occurred, most notably that of the Jewish prisoners of the Sonderkommando in October 1944. The Polish resistance organizations, with help from Poles outside the camp, were also involved in smuggling in medicines for the prisoners.

The role of communist resistance, both Polish and international, has been unduly exaggerated by the communist-era historiography and other works in communist-era USSR and its satellite states such as Poland; further, communist era historiography attempted to suppress the information about the Home Army members inside the camp and their role in the resistance.
