= Law and Justice Youth Forum =

Youth wing of the Polish conservative party

Law and Justice Youth Forum Forum Młodych Prawa i Sprawiedliwości
- Chairman: Michał Moskal
- Founded: 2002
- Headquarters: 84-86 ul. Nowogrodzka; 02-018 Warsaw
- Ideology: National conservatism Christian democracy Christian right Right-wing populism Catholic Integralism
- Mother party: Law and Justice
- European affiliation: European Young Conservatives

Law and Justice Youth Forum (Polish: Forum Młodych Prawa i Sprawiedliwości), abbreviated to FM PiS, is the youth wing of the Polish conservative party Law and Justice.

It was founded in 2002. Its current chairman is Michał Moskal.

FM PiS is a member of the European Young Conservatives, whose congress it hosted in Warsaw in May 2012.

== See also ==
- Politics of Poland
