= Marek Kuchciński =

Polish politician (born 1955)

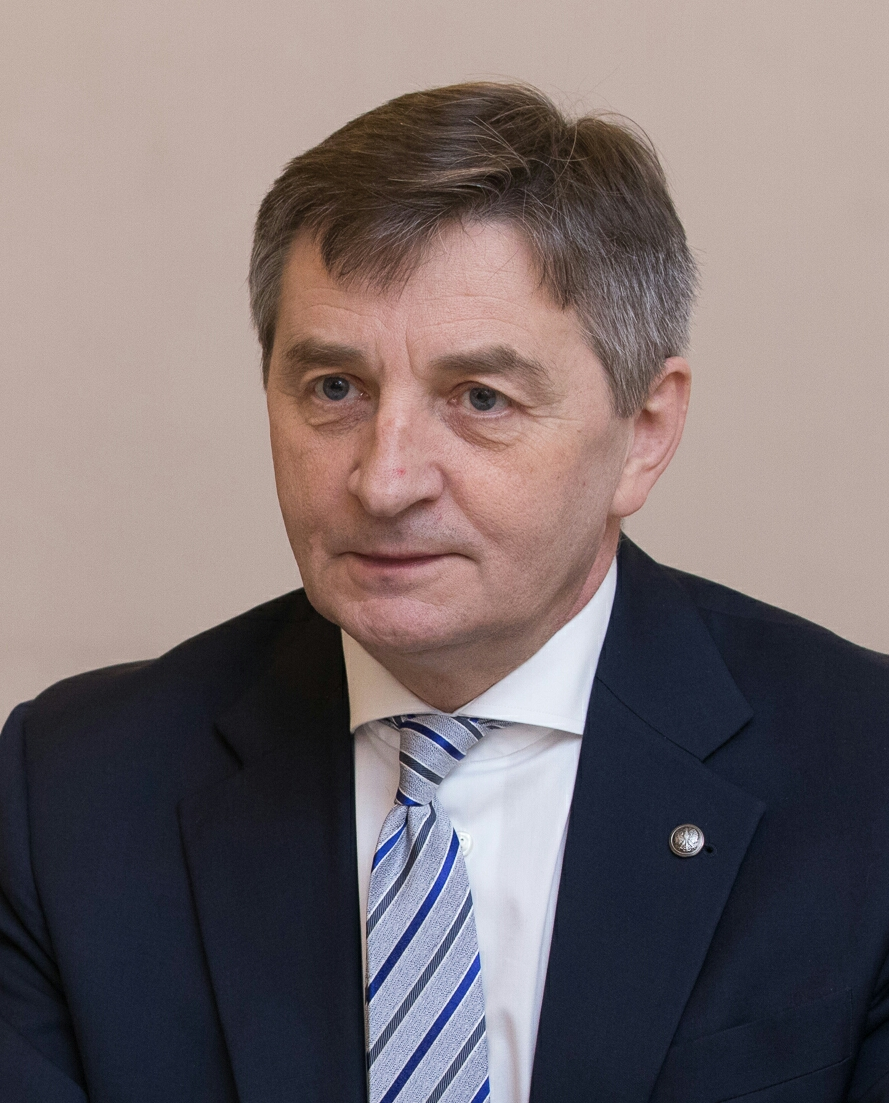
- Kuchciński in 2017

Marshal of the Sejm
- In office 12 November 2015 – 9 August 2019
- President: Andrzej Duda
- Deputy: See list: Małgorzata Gosiewska; Beata Mazurek; Joachim Brudziński; Ryszard Terlecki; Małgorzata Kidawa-Błońska; Stanisław Tyszka; Barbara Dolniak
- Preceded by: Małgorzata Kidawa-Błońska
- Succeeded by: Elżbieta Witek

Chief of the Chancellery of the Prime Minister
- In office 13 October 2022 – 27 November 2023
- Prime Minister: Mateusz Morawiecki
- Preceded by: Michał Dworczyk
- Succeeded by: Izabela Antos

Deputy Marshal of the Sejm
- In office 4 August 2010 – 11 November 2015 Serving with See List
- Marshal: Grzegorz Schetyna; Ewa Kopacz; Radosław Sikorski; Małgorzata Kidawa-Błońska

Parliamentary Caucus Head of Law and Justice
- In office 19 July 2006 – 13 November 2007
- Preceded by: Przemysław Gosiewski
- Succeeded by: Przemysław Gosiewski
- Acting; 10 April 2010 – 3 August 2010
- Preceded by: Grażyna Gęsicka
- Succeeded by: Mariusz Błaszczak

Member of the Sejm
- Incumbent
- Assumed office 19 October 2001

Personal details
- Born: Marek Tadeusz Kuchciński; 9 August 1955 (age 70) Przemyśl, Poland
- Party: Law and Justice
- Children: 3
- Website: Official website

Marek Tadeusz Kuchciński (born 9 August 1955) is a Polish politician and member of the Sejm, first elected in 2001. Prior to 2015, he served as one of the Deputy Marshals of the Sejm, nominated by the Law and Justice (PiS) parliamentary club, and also held the position of head of the party's parliamentary caucus. From 2015 to 2019, during the period when Law and Justice held a majority in both houses of parliament, he served as Marshal of the Sejm.

== Early life ==
Kuchciński studied art history at the John Paul II Catholic University of Lublin but did not complete his degree.

== Political career ==
In 1999, Kuchciński co-founded Europe of the Carpathians, an initiative of the Sejm held in the Subcarpathian Voivodeship, aimed at promoting sustainable development in the broader Carpathian region. The initiative initially focused on cooperation between Poland, Slovakia, and Ukraine, but later expanded to include seven countries: Poland, the Czech Republic, Romania, Serbia, Slovakia, Ukraine, and Hungary. Over time, the initiative became a key platform for dialogue and the exchange of ideas among Central and Eastern European politicians, experts, activists, and representatives of non-governmental organisations. Meetings are held on a cyclical basis.

In the 2005 parliamentary elections, Kuchciński was re-elected to the Sejm and later appointed head of the Law and Justice parliamentary caucus, succeeding Przemysław Gosiewski. From 2005 to 2007, he served as chair of the Administration and Home Affairs Committee. In the 2007 parliamentary elections, he was again re-elected, receiving 35,060 votes in the 22 – Krosno district.

On 12 January 2008, Jarosław Kaczyński appointed Kuchciński as Deputy Chairman of Law and Justice, a position he held until 24 July 2010. Following the Smolensk air disaster on 10 April 2010, in which Grażyna Gęsicka and 95 others, including President Lech Kaczyński, were killed, Kuchciński was appointed acting head of the Law and Justice parliamentary caucus. He was subsequently elected Deputy Marshal of the Sejm on 4 August 2010, replacing Krzysztof Putra, who also died in the Smolensk crash.

In the 2011 parliamentary elections, Kuchciński was re-elected, receiving 23,128 votes while heading the Law and Justice list for the Krosno–Przemyśl constituency. On 8 November 2011, he was again appointed Deputy Marshal of the Sejm under Speaker Ewa Kopacz.

In the 2015 parliamentary elections, Kuchciński was re-elected with 34,558 votes. Following Law and Justice's electoral victory, Małgorzata Kidawa-Błońska resigned as Marshal of the Sejm on 11 November 2015. The next day, Kuchciński was nominated by Law and Justice as a candidate for Marshal of the Sejm and was elected with 409 votes. His opponent, Kornel Morawiecki of the Kukiz'15 parliamentary group, received 42 votes.

== Marshal of the Sejm (2015–2019) ==
=== December 2016 Polish protests ===
On 16 December 2016, during a session of the Sejm, opposition deputy Michał Szczerba of the Civic Platform party approached the podium with a sign reading "#WolneMediawSejmie" (translated as "Free Media in the Sejm") and attempted to attach it to the rostrum. After issuing warnings, Marshal of the Sejm Marek Kuchciński excluded him from the debate for causing a disturbance and announced a break. In response, opposition deputies occupied the podium and plenary chamber. Subsequently, members of the Law and Justice party relocated the session to the Hall of Columns, where they proceeded to vote on several matters, including the 2017 budget. Many opposition MPs, who remained in the plenary chamber, did not participate in the vote, which was conducted by a show of hands.

=== "Air Kuchciński" scandal and resignation ===
On 26 July 2019, Kuchciński faced significant media criticism regarding his use of government flights. He had travelled on numerous occasions with various Law and Justice politicians, including Minister of Infrastructure Andrzej Adamczyk, Marshal of the Subcarpathian Voivodeship Władysław Ortyl, Chairman of the Polish Press Agency, Law and Justice Members of the European Parliament, as well as assistants and directors. The opposition, particularly the Civic Coalition, accused him of misusing state aircraft for private purposes.

On 5 August 2019, Kuchciński issued a statement acknowledging that he had been accompanied by family members on 23 flights, and that on one occasion, his wife had travelled without him. At a press conference, he emphasised that the flights were never for private purposes. In response to public criticism, he apologised and donated a total of 43,000 PLN (approximately US$11,190) to charity as a form of reparation.

Kuchciński maintained that he had not broken any laws. Law and Justice party leader Jarosław Kaczyński stated that the core issue was the absence of clear regulations governing official use of government aircraft. He also noted that former Prime Minister Donald Tusk had taken a greater number of flights during his tenure, travelling between Warsaw and his home city of Gdańsk with his wife 520 times. The reported cost of Tusk's flights amounted to nearly 8 million PLN (approximately US$2 million), while Kuchciński's total flight costs were estimated at 4 million PLN.

== Personal life ==
Kuchciński is married and has three children.

== See also ==
- History of Poland (1989–present)
- List of political parties in Poland
- List of politicians in Poland
- Members of Polish Sejm 2005–2007
- Politics of Poland
- 2005 Polish parliamentary election
- 2007 Polish parliamentary election
- 2011 Polish parliamentary election
- 2015 Polish parliamentary election

Political offices
Preceded by Małgorzata Kidawa-Błońska	Marshal of the Sejm; 2015–2019	Succeeded by Elżbieta Witek
