= Polish Sejm crisis =

2016–2017 stalemate in the Polish legislature

- Part of the Polish rule-of-law crisis
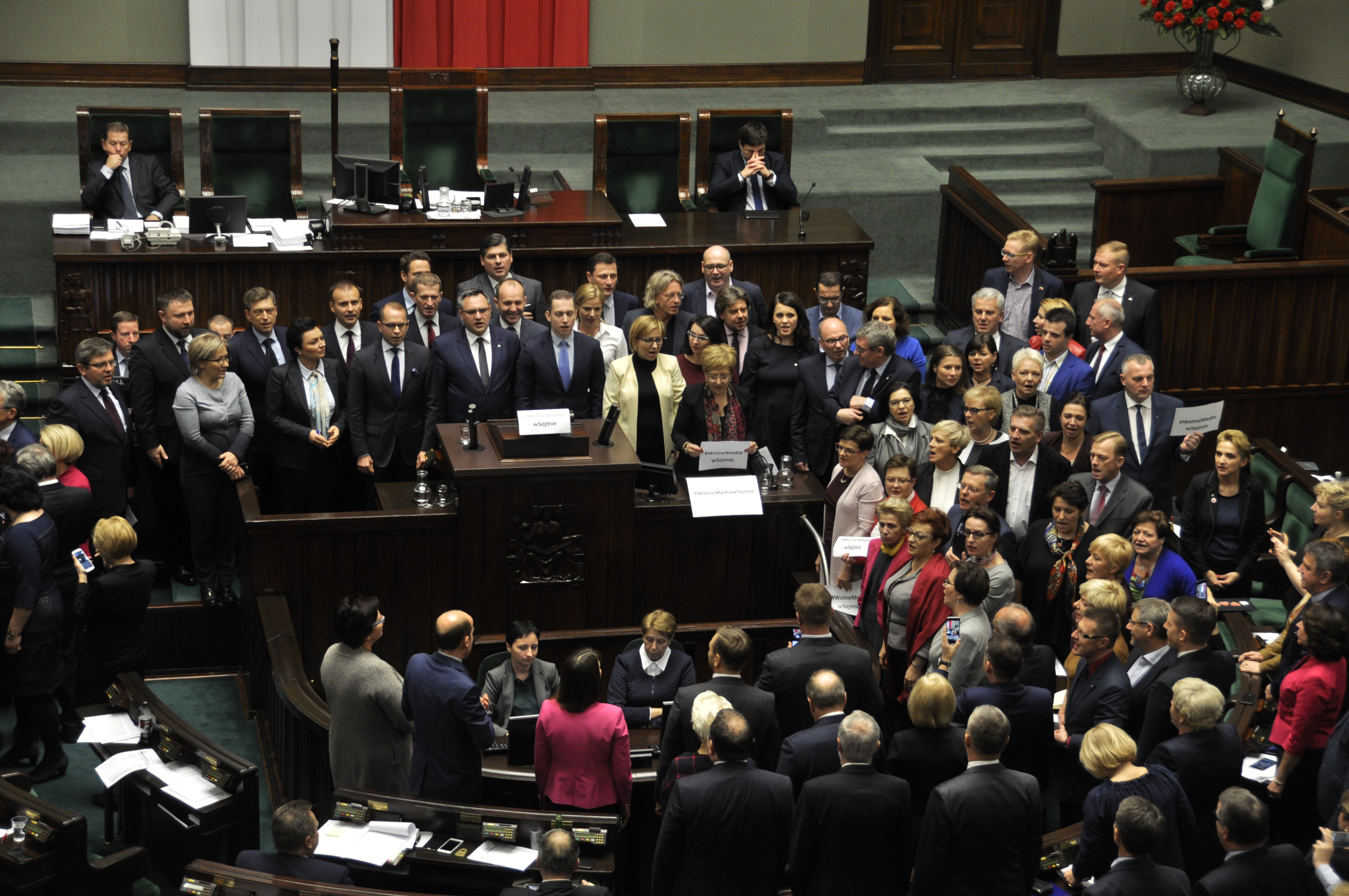
- Date: 16 December 2016 – 12 January 2017
- Location: Poland (biggest cities)
- Caused by: Parliamentarian crisis, regulations limiting the press and media to passage with all media equipment such as cameras on all corridors in Sejm buildings
- Methods: Civil resistance, demonstrations, protest marches, picketing
- Status: Inactive

Parties
Protesters: Committee for the Defence of Democracy; (support parties); Civic Platform; Modern	Polish Government: Polish Police; Guards of Sejm; Law and Justice

Number
17 December 2016; Few thousands	

The Polish Sejm crisis (Polish: Kryzys sejmowy w Polsce) was a period of political stalemate in Poland's national legislature from 16 December 2016 to 12 January 2017, resulting from an attempt to limit freedom of the press at the Sejm buildings in Warsaw, Poland. The attempt to reorganize press access to Sejm members, certain chambers and deliberations led to protests by opposition-party Sejm members, and by pro-opposition citizens of Poland's major cities, including Warsaw.

== Background ==
On 19 November 2016, at the initiative of Press Club Poland, a letter was submitted to the Speaker of the Sejm on plans to limit the presence of journalists in the Sejm. The letter was signed by 28 heads of editorial offices.

On 14 December 2016, the Press Office of the Chancellery of the Sejm published information on changes to the organisation of journalists' work in the Sejm. The changes were to include:

- moving media work to a new Media Centre in Building F, 150 m away from the main Sejm building (journalists would have unlimited access to the Media Centre);
- restricting the recording and photographing of coverage of the Sejm and parliamentary committees' debates to their duration only - prohibiting the recording of parliamentarians before or after the debates;
- the creation of a single space in the Sejm building for television stations to provide 'live' coverage and recording for later broadcast (which journalists would have to reserve);
- limiting the number of parliamentary correspondents to two per newsroom (journalists would have to work in shifts).

The proposals of the Press Office of the Chancellery of the Sejm were criticised by many journalists.

On 16 December 2016 during the session of Polish parliament, the Sejm, opposition deputy Michał Szczerba (from Civic Platform party) came to the stage with the card which read "#WolneMediawSejmie" (hashtag "Free press in Sejm") and attempted to fix it to the rostrum. After warnings, Marshal of the Sejm, Marek Kuchciński, excluded him from debate for disturbance and announced a break. As planned before, opposition deputies started the occupation of the podium and the plenary hall. Subsequently, the MPs of ruling party, Law and Justice, moved the meeting to the Hall of Columns, where the deputies voted on, among other topics, the budget for 2017. A number of MPs from the opposition who still occupied the plenary hall did not participate in the voting, and the vote count was done by show of hands.

== Protests ==
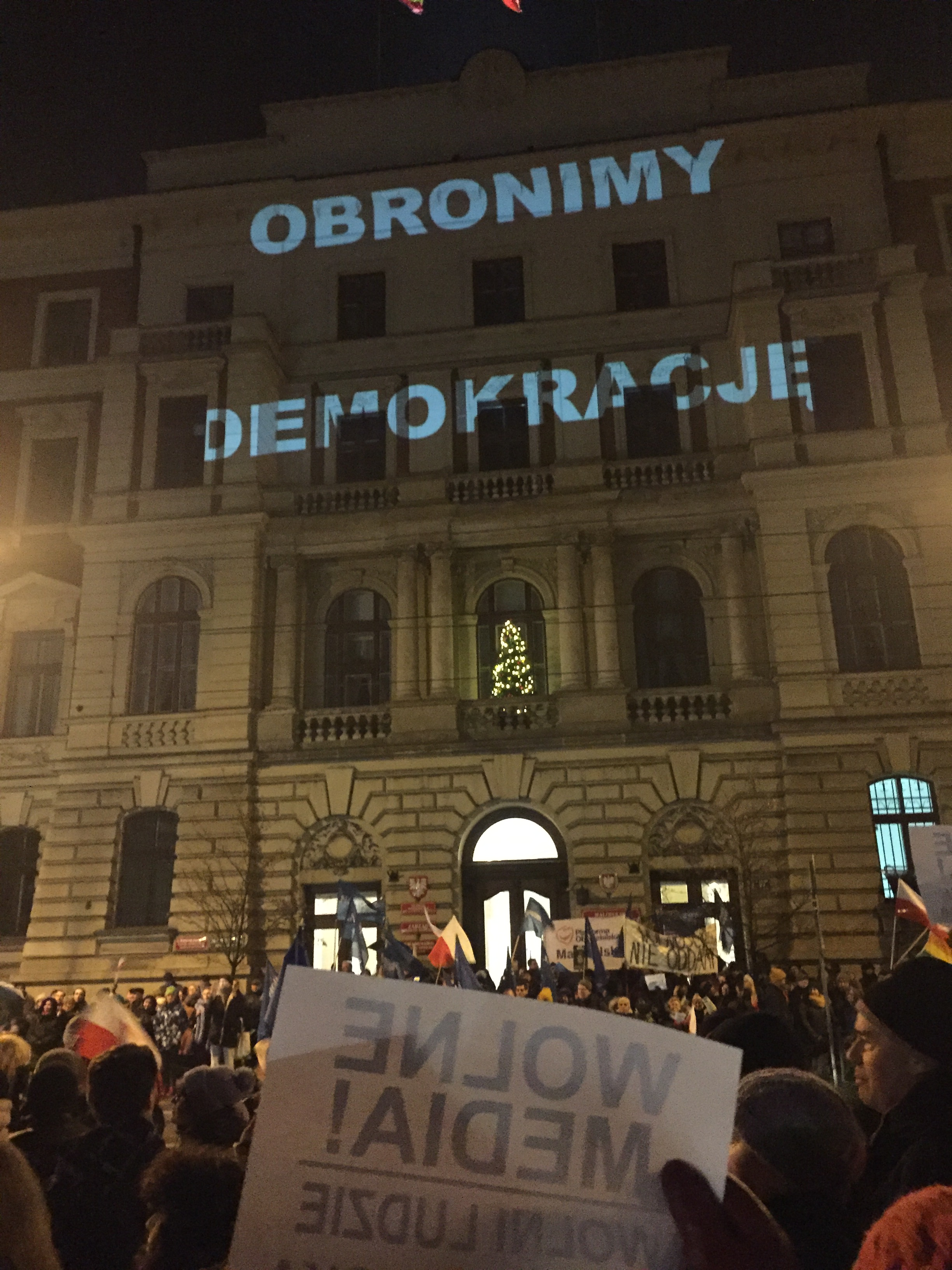
Protest against limiting of freedom of the press, Kraków 16 Dec. 2016

First groups of protesters appeared in front of the parliament before locking the plenary hall in the protest against restrictions for press in Sejm buildings. It included dozens of journalist from mainstream Polish media, including from Gazeta Wyborcza, Newsweek Polska and TVN24. The protest was supported by many people associated with the opposition, including Deputy Marshal of the Sejm Małgorzata Kidawa-Błońska, Civic Platform leader Grzegorz Schetyna, Modern leader Ryszard Petru, Committee for the Defence of Democracy leader Mateusz Kijowski, civic movement Citizens of Poland. During the night of 16 and 17 December protesters blocked street in front of parliament, obstructed work of journalists and tried to clash with police.

On 16 and 17 December protests were held in many of big cities in Poland including Wrocław, Kraków, Gdańsk, Poznań, Szczecin, Katowice, Olsztyn, Białystok, Lublin, Kielce and Płock.
