= Jan Król =

Polish economist and politician

Vice-Marshal of the Senate of the Republic of Poland
- In office October 20, 1997 – October 18, 2001; Served alongside: Marek Borowski, Franciszek Stefaniuk, Stanisław Zając
- Preceded by: Marek Borowski, Olga Krzyżanowska, Aleksander Małachowski
- Succeeded by: Andrzej Lepper, Tomasz Nałęcz, Donald Tusk, Janusz Wojciechowski

Personal details
- Born: June 14, 1950 (age 75) Mielec, Poland
- Party: Solidarity, Democratic Union, Freedom Union
- Profession: Economist

Jan Władysław Król (born June 24, 1950) is a Polish economist and politician, former member of Sejm.

A graduate of Kraków University of Economics, he was elected to Contract Sejm in 1989 from Solidarity. He served following three terms from Democratic Union and Freedom Union. He was a Sejm Member from 1989 to 2001.

Król served as a Sejm Vice-Marshal from 1997 to 2001.

In 2001 parliamentary election he lost his seat.
