= Barbara Dolniak =

Polish politician (born 1960)

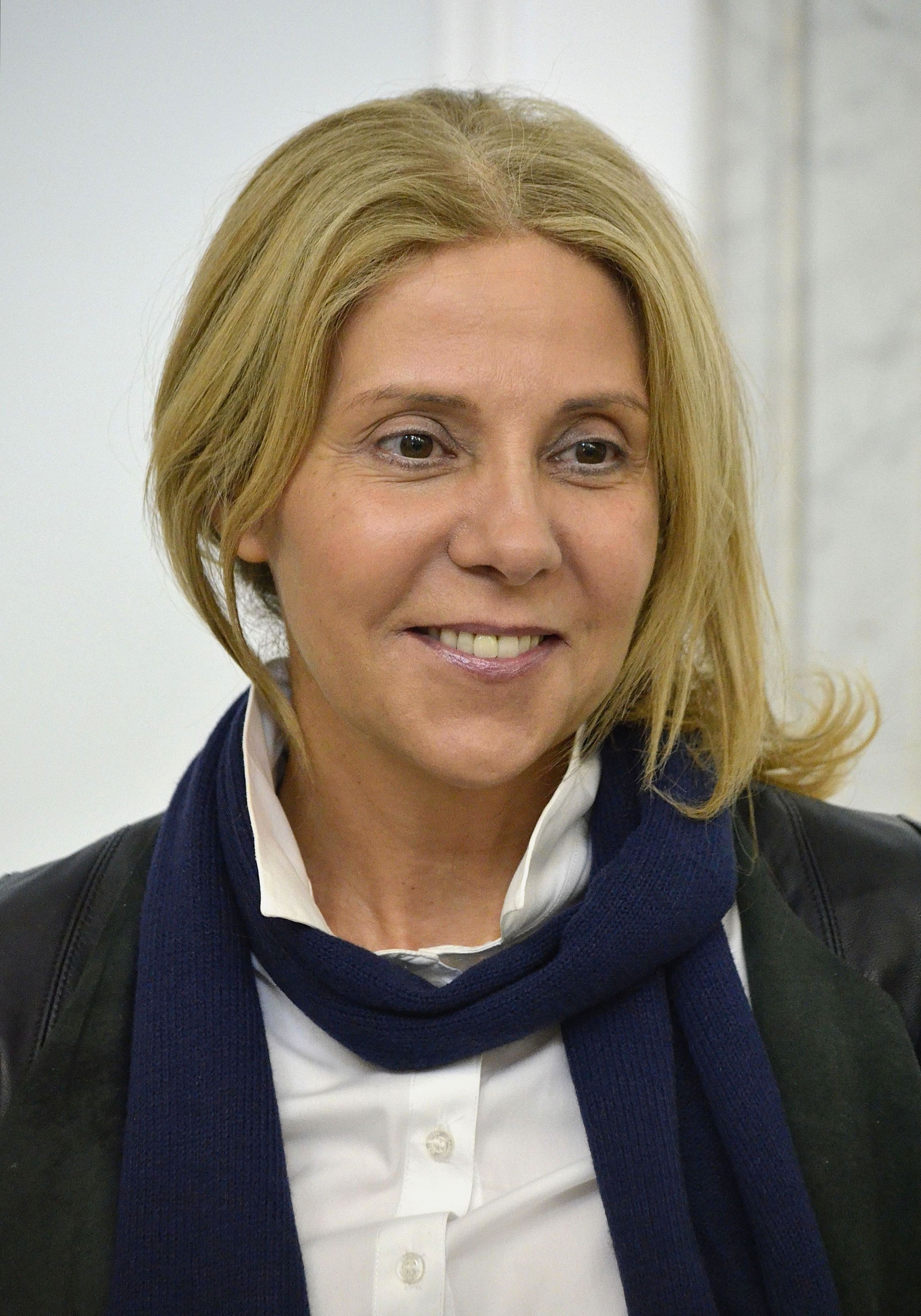

Deputy Marshal of the Sejm
- In office 12 November 2015 – 12 November 2019 Serving with See List
- Marshal: Marek Kuchciński; Elżbieta Witek

Personal details
- Born: 12 September 1960 (age 65) Bytom, Poland
- Party: Modern
- Spouse: Grzegorz Dolniak (until 2010)
- Children: Patrycja
- Website: http://www.dolniak.eu/

Barbara Dolniak (née Przyłucka; born 12 September 1960) is a Polish politician who currently serves as the Deputy Marshal of the Sejm of the Republic of Poland, a position she has held since 2015. She graduated with a law degree from the University of Silesia in Katowice. In her postgraduate studies, she graduated with a focus in European Union Law and Judicial Application. After graduating, Dolniak became a lawyer and a judge in the District Court of Katowice, and served in that role for 30 years.

She married Grzegorz Dolniak, who was a member of the Sejm for five years. He died on 10 April 2010, a casualty of the Tupolev Tu-154 crash. After his death, Barbara started the "Sportowa Szansa" foundation in his honor, which provides scholarships to young athletes of Poland. In 2011, she ran for the Senate of Poland as an independent candidate. She finished second out of eight candidates with 34,890 votes, losing to Zbigniew Meres's 47,820 votes. In 2015, Dolniak ran for the Sejm as a member of the Modern party. She received 15,752 votes in the election, which was enough to earn her a spot on the Sejm.

After being elected to the Sejm, Dolniak was named a Deputy Marshal, and serves on the Committee on Justice and Human Rights. She had spoken out about proposed reforms to the National Council of the Judiciary, stating that while reforms are needed, having politicians choose judges rather than judges themselves is a step in the wrong direction.

In the 2019 and 2023 elections, she successfully ran for re-election to the Sejm on behalf of the Civic Coalition, receiving 39,656 votes and 37,470 votes, respectively. In the 10th term of the Sejm, she took on the role of Chairwoman of the Special Committee on Changes in Codifications and also sat on the Legislative Committee and the Justice and Human Rights Committee.

== Personal life ==
She was the wife of the politician Grzegorz Dolniak who died in 2010 in the crash of the Polish Tu-154 aircraft in Smolensk, Russia. She has a daughter, Patrycja, who works also as lawyer. She lives in Będzin.
