= Grzegorz Dolniak =

Polish politician (1960-2010)

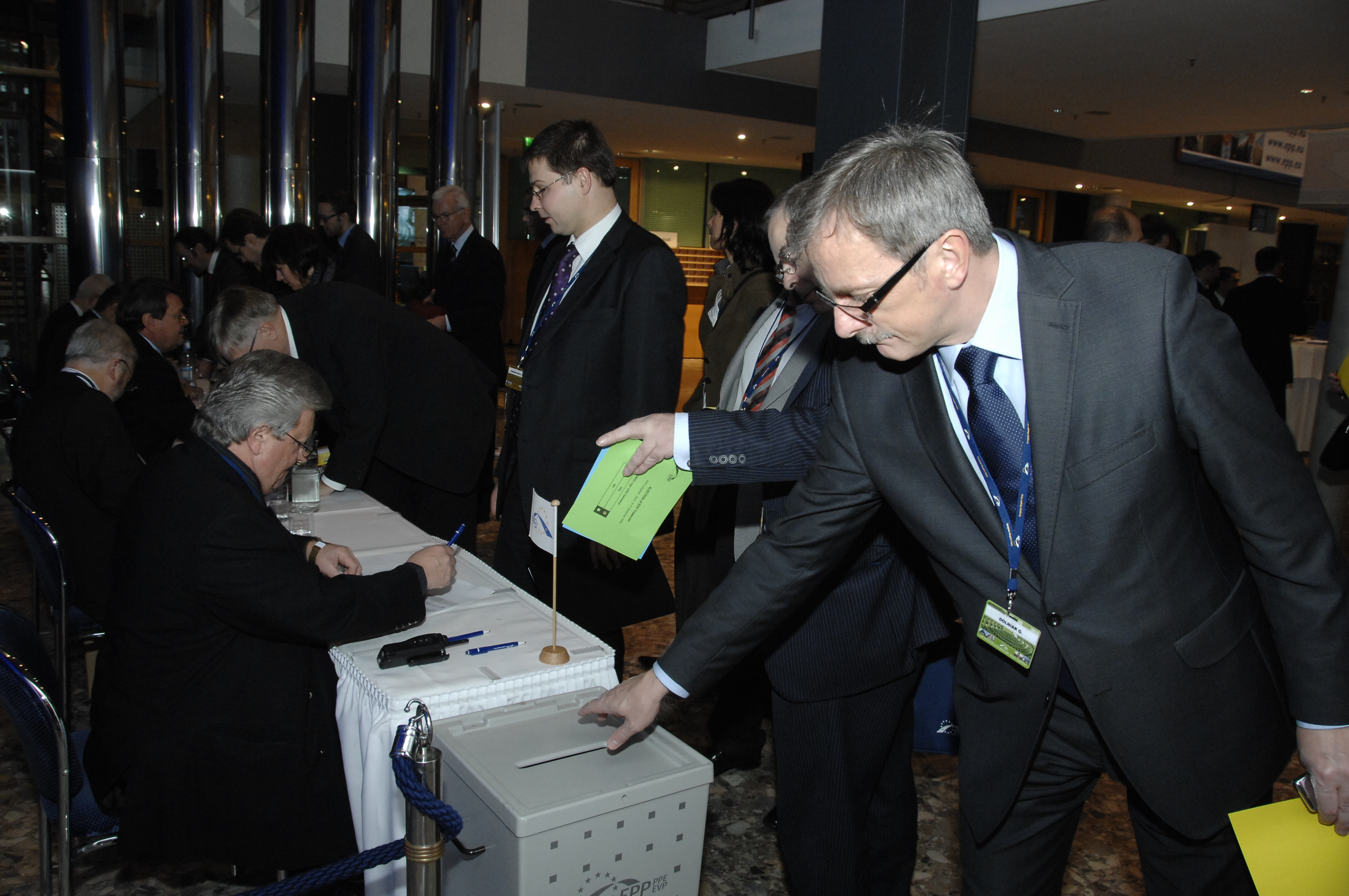

Acting Parliamentary Leader of the Civic Platform Acting Leader of the Civic Platform in the Sejm
- In office October 2–9, 2009
- Leader: Donald Tusk
- Preceded by: Zbigniew Chlebowski
- Succeeded by: Grzegorz Schetyna

Member of the Sejm
- In office 2001–2010
- Constituency: 32-Sosnowiec

Personal details
- Born: 17 February 1960 Będzin, Polish People's Republic
- Died: 10 April 2010 (aged 50) near Smolensk, Russia
- Party: Civic Platform

Grzegorz Maciej Dolniak (Gizh-eh-gozh Dawl-nee-ak; 17 February 1960 in Będzin – 10 April 2010) was a Polish politician. He was elected to the Sejm on 25 September 2005, getting 12,151 votes in the 32nd Sosnowiec district as a candidate from the Civic Platform list. He was also a member of Sejm 2001–05.

He was listed on the flight manifest of the Tupolev Tu-154 of the 36th Special Aviation Regiment carrying the President of Poland Lech Kaczyński which crashed near Smolensk-North airport near Pechersk near Smolensk, Russia, on 10 April 2010, killing all aboard.

On 16 April 2010 Dolniak was decorated posthumously with the Commander's Cross of the Order of Polonia Restituta. On 22 April he was buried in the cemetery at Holy Trinity Parish in Będzin. His wife, Barbara, became a politician as well, serving as Deputy Marshal of the Sejm.

== See also ==
- Members of Polish Sejm 2005–07
