= 2020 Civic Platform leadership election =

Polish election

- 25 January 2020
- Registered: 10,816
- Turnout: 8,266
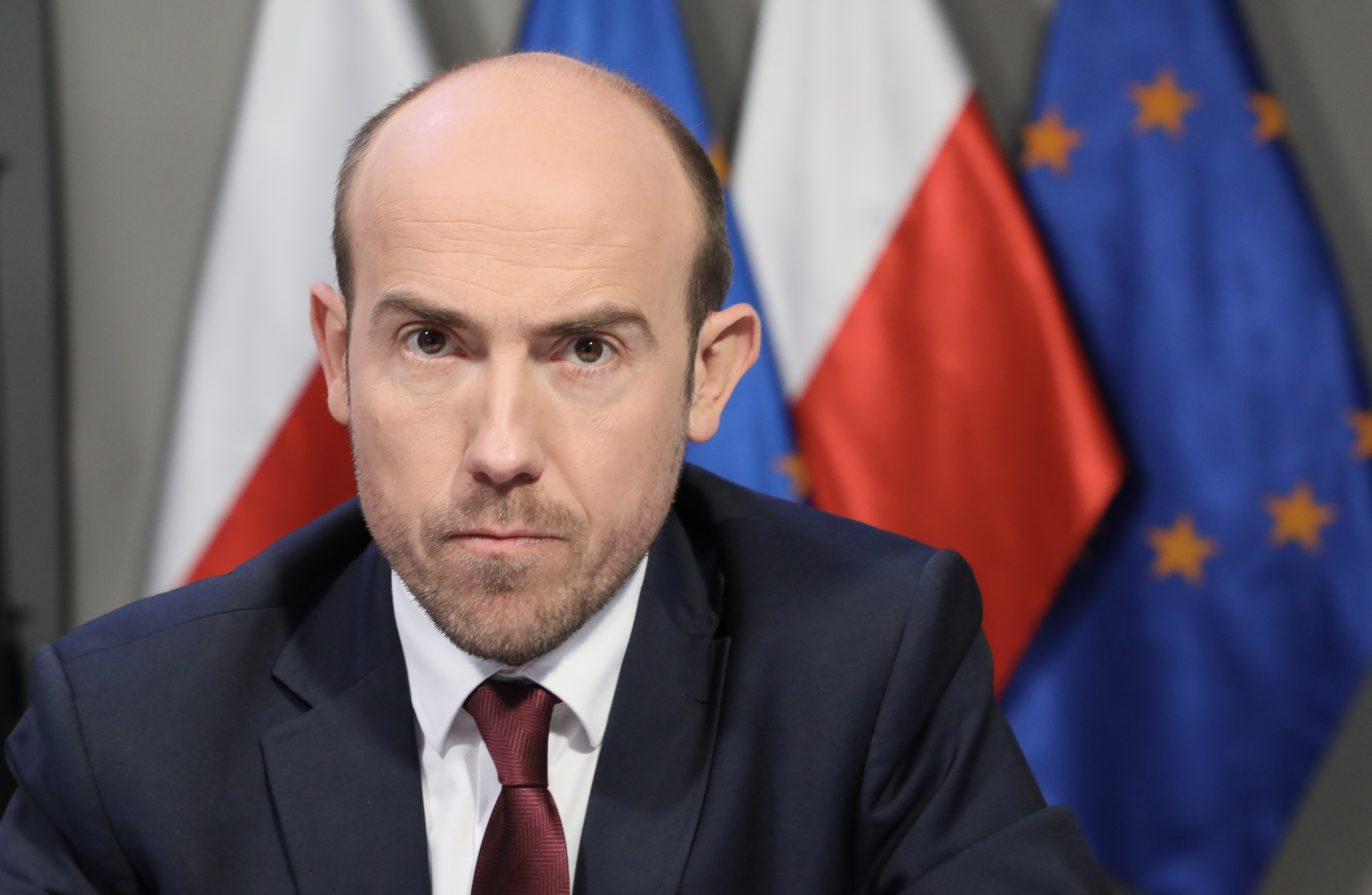

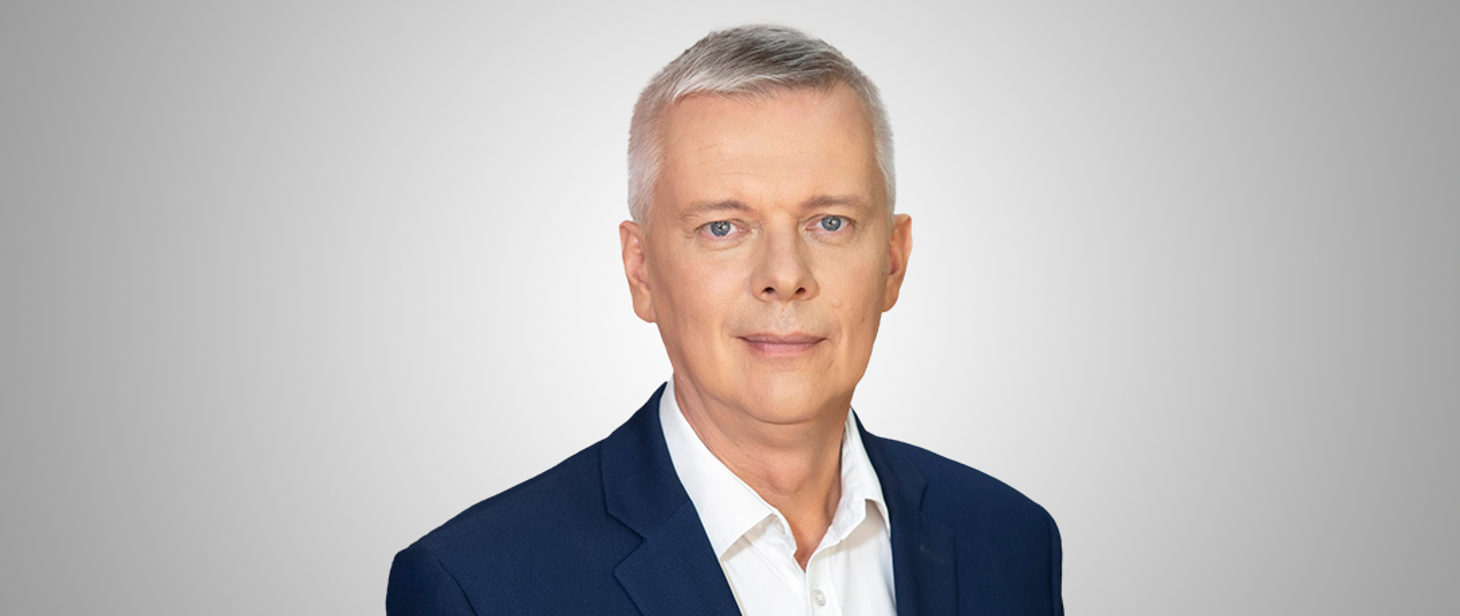

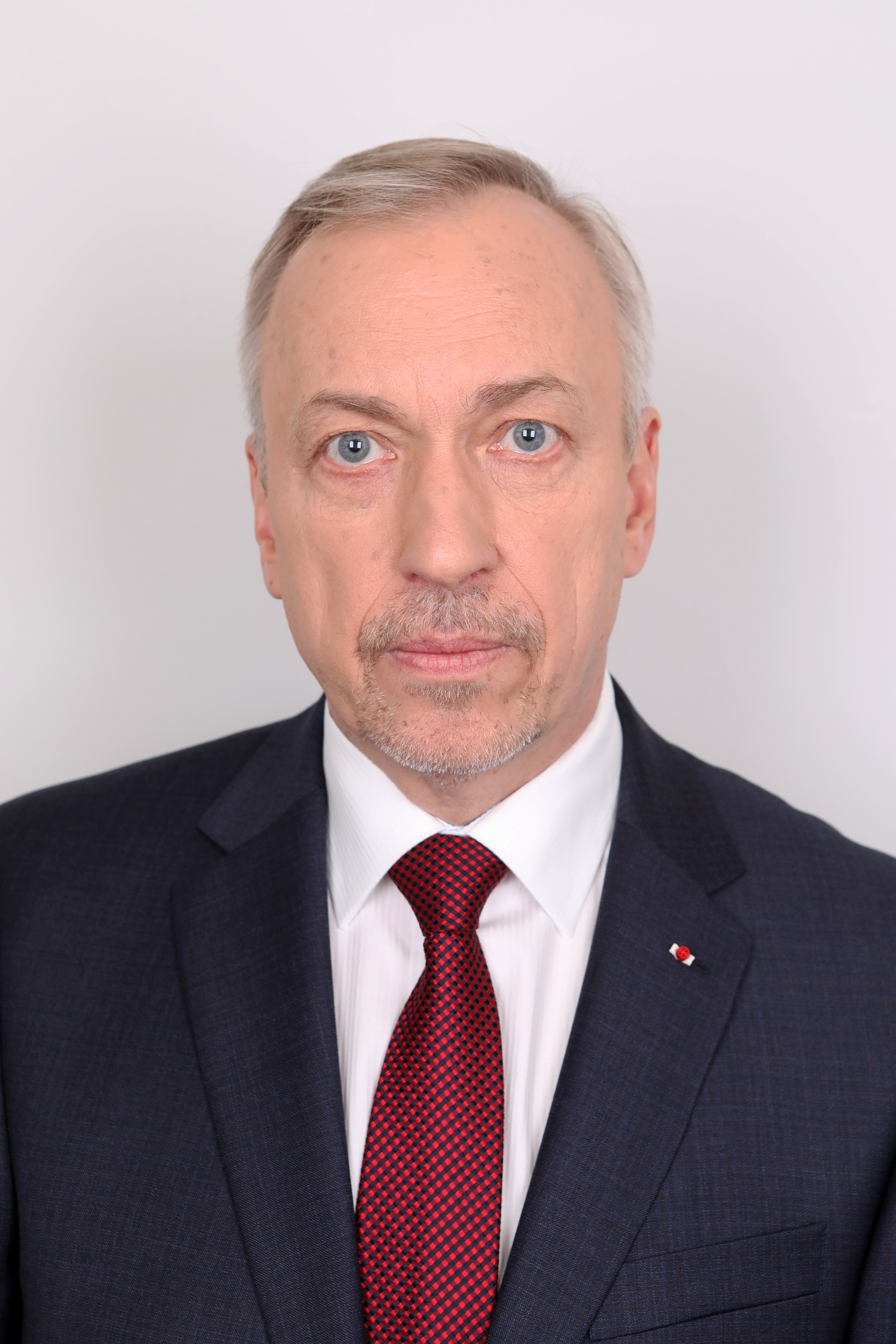
Candidate	Borys Budka	Tomasz Siemoniak	Bogdan Zdrojewski
Popular vote	6,481	920	623
Percentage	78.77% (Note: Official results from 29 January gave Budka 78.49% of the vote.)	11.18%	7.57%
Leader before election
Grzegorz Schetyna
Elected Leader
Borys Budka

The 2020 Civic Platform leadership election was held in January 2020 to elect the leader of the Civic Platform. Borys Budka was elected as the new leader of the party, defeating Tomasz Siemoniak, Bogdan Zdrojewski and Bartłomiej Sienkiewicz in a landslide, earning 78% of the vote. Despite Budka's large mandate, he would not serve his full four year term, as he resigned to allow Donald Tusk's return as party leader in 2021.

== Procedure ==
The leadership election took place on 25 January 2020 with a runoff scheduled for 8 February had the party not selected a leader in the first round. All 10,816 party members were eligible to vote, and turnout reached 76%. The registration period in the party lasted until 3 January.

== Candidates ==
Candidate	Born	Political office
Borys Budka	11 March 1978; Czeladź, Poland	Minister of Justice (2015); Member of the Sejm (2011–present)
Tomasz Siemoniak	2 July 1967; Wałbrzych, Poland	Member of the Sejm (2015–present); Deputy Prime Minister of Poland (2014–2015); Minister of National Defence (2011–2015)
Bartłomiej Sienkiewicz	29 July 1961; Kielce, Poland	Minister of the Interior (2013–2014)
Bogdan Zdrojewski	18 May 1957; Kłodzko, Poland	Senator (2019–present); Minister of Culture and National Heritage (2007–2014); Member of the Sejm (2005–2014); Member of the European Parliament (2014–2019)

=== Withdrawn candidates ===
Candidate	Born	Political office	Withdrawn
Joanna Mucha	12 April 1976; Płońsk, Poland	Member of the Sejm (2007–present); Minister of Sport and Tourism (2011–2013)	22 January 2020
Bartosz Arłukowicz	30 December 1971; Resko, Poland	Member of the Sejm (2005–2019); Minister of Health (2011–2015)	17 January 2020

== Results ==
Preliminary results from 25 January were as follows:

Candidate	Vote	%
Borys Budka ✓	6,481	78.77
Tomasz Siemoniak	920	11.18
Bogdan Zdrojewski	623	7.57
Bartłomiej Sienkiewicz	204	2.48
Total votes	8,266	100.00
Registered voters/turnout	10,816	76.42
Source: Civic Platform

Later official results stated that Budka had won with a slightly smaller 78.49% of the vote, but did not give results for the rest of the election.

== Aftermath ==
Despite the high turnout 8,266 votes, Forbes noted the decline in voters since the party's 2016 and 2013 leadership elections. Budka's four-year term ended short, with him deciding to stand down in mid-2021, inviting former prime minister Donald Tusk to assume the position of party leader. Tusk was elected as party leader with no opposition in 2021 with 11,747 votes for his candidacy, and 252 invalid.
