= Franciszek Stefaniuk =

Polish politician (born 1944)

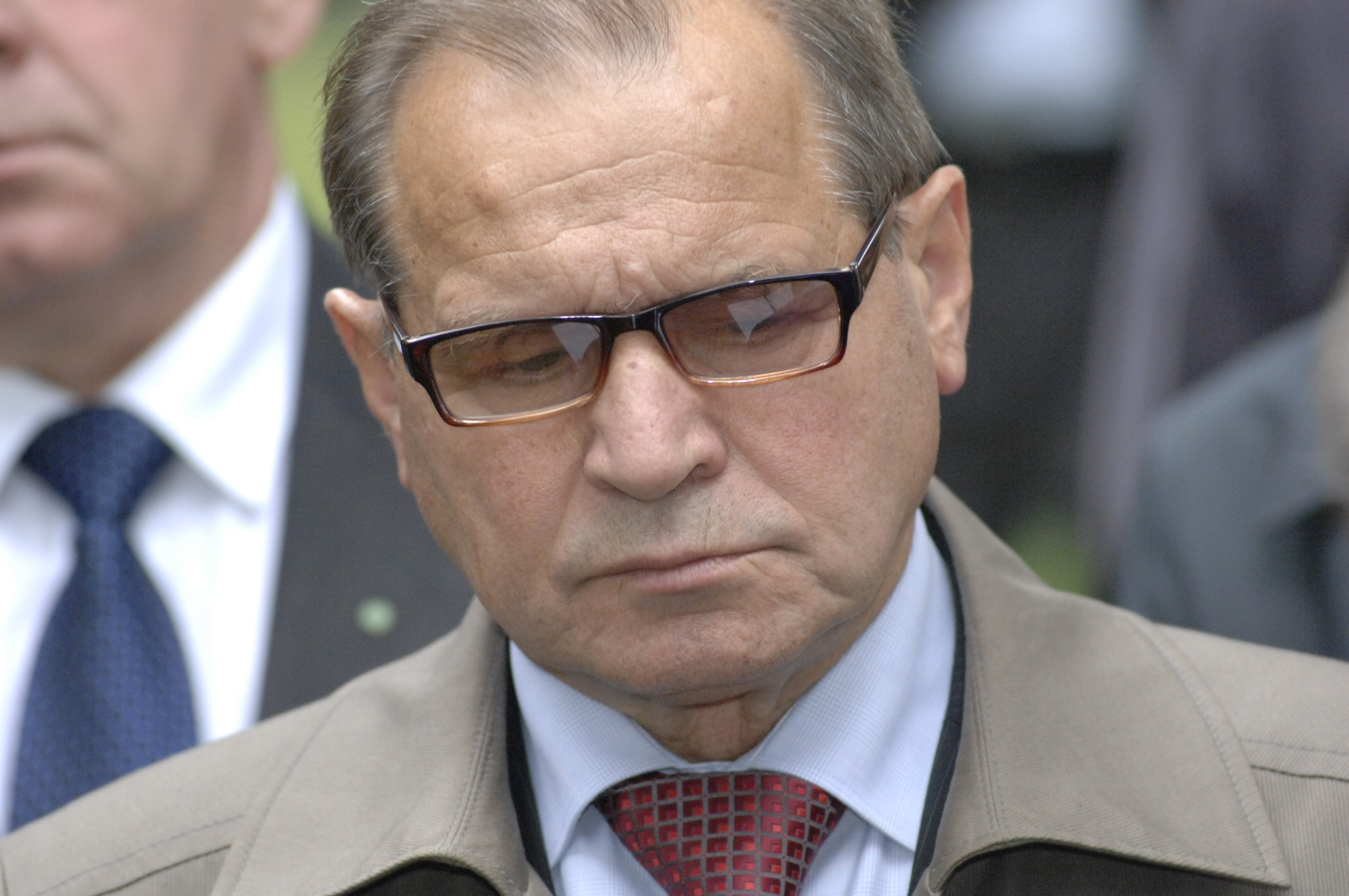

Vice-Marshal of the Sejm of the Republic of Poland
- In office 20 October 1997 – 18 October 2001; Served alongside: Marek Borowski, Jan Król, Stanisław Zając
- Preceded by: Marek Borowski, Włodzimierz Cimoszewicz, Olga Krzyżanowska, Aleksander Małachowski, Józef Zych
- Succeeded by: Andrzej Lepper, Janusz Wojciechowski, Tomasz Nałęcz, Donald Tusk

Sejm Member from 7th District Chełm, Lublin Voivodeship
- In office 28 June 1989 – 18 October 2015

Personal details
- Born: Franciszek Jerzy Stefaniuk; 4 June 1944 (age 81) Drelów, Poland
- Party: Polish People's Party

Franciszek Jerzy Stefaniuk (born 4 June 1944) is a Polish politician of the agrarian Polish People's Party (Polskie Stronnictwo Ludowe), who served as a Sejm member from the Contract Sejm (1989) until 2015, representing Chełm (7th district). He was re-elected for his eight term in October 2011, winning 10,527 votes. Four years later he failed to secure a ninth term.

Known as one of his party's leaders, he served as a Sejm Vice-Marshal from 1997 until 2001 (alongside Marek Borowski of Democratic Left Alliance, Jan Król of Freedom Union and Stanisław Zając of Solidarity Electoral Action.

He was one of the members of commission which issued a project of current constitution. From 2001 to 2005 he was chairman of the Sejm Constitutional Commission.
