= Elżbieta Witek =

Polish politician (born 1957)

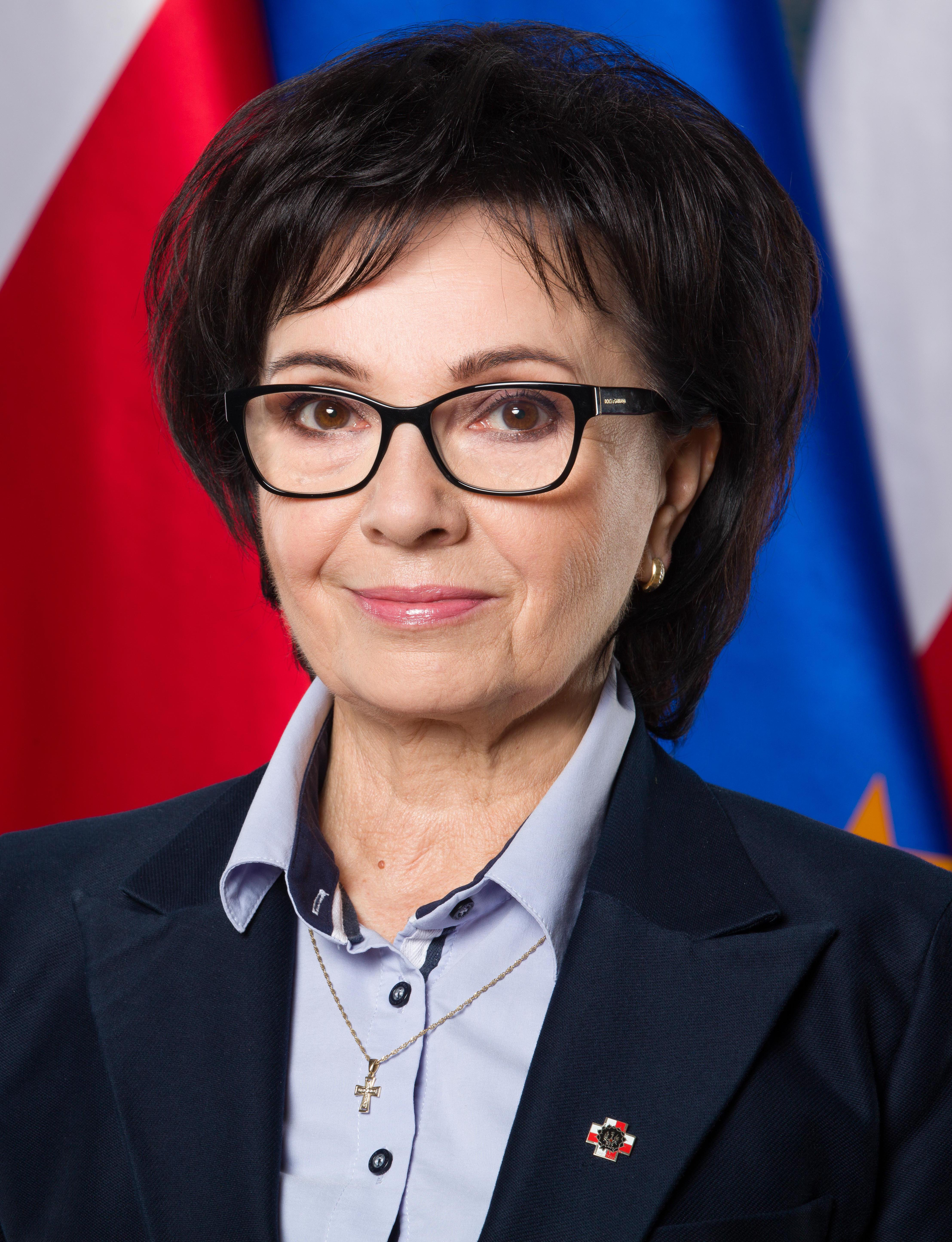
- Official portrait, 2019

Marshal of the Sejm
- In office 9 August 2019 – 12 November 2023
- President: Andrzej Duda
- Deputy: See list: Małgorzata Gosiewska; Ryszard Terlecki; Małgorzata Kidawa-Błońska; Stanisław Tyszka; Barbara Dolniak; Włodzimierz Czarzasty; Piotr Zgorzelski
- Preceded by: Marek Kuchciński
- Succeeded by: Szymon Hołownia

Minister of the Interior and Administration
- In office 4 June 2019 – 9 August 2019
- Prime Minister: Mateusz Morawiecki
- Preceded by: Joachim Brudziński
- Succeeded by: Mariusz Kamiński

Member of the Sejm
- Incumbent
- Assumed office 18 October 2005
- Constituency: 1 – Legnica

Personal details
- Born: 17 December 1957 (age 68) Jawor, Poland
- Party: Law and Justice
- Spouse: Stanisław Witek (m. 1980; died 2024)
- Children: 2
- Education: University of Wrocław

Elżbieta Barbara Witek (Polish pronunciation: [ɛlʐˈbjɛta barˈbara ˈvitɛk]; née Zbanuch; born 17 December 1957) is a Polish conservative politician of the Law and Justice party, A history teacher by profession, she was Marshal of the Sejm of the Republic of Poland for the 8th and 9th parliamentary terms from 2019 to 2023.

Member of the Sejm for the 5th, 6th, 7th, 8th, 9th and 10th terms (since 2005). Government spokeswoman from 2015 to 2016, from 2015 to 2017 Minister-Member of the Council of Ministers and Head of the Prime Minister's Political Cabinet in the governments of Beata Szydło and Mateusz Morawiecki, in 2019 Minister of the Interior and Administration in the first cabinet of Mateusz Morawiecki.

== Early life and education ==
Born in Wrocław, Witek completed her master's degree in history at the Faculty of Philosophy and History of Wrocław University in 1980. She furthered her education by completing post-graduate studies in European Union studies at the Wrocław University Institute of History in 1996.

Her professional career began immediately after her graduation in 1980 when she took up a teaching position in Jawor. She progressed to become the head teacher at Jawor Primary School No. 2 in 1991, and later at the General Secondary School Complex in Jawor. In addition to her educational roles, she served as a lay judge in the labour court for four years. From 2004 to 2008, she held the position of vice-president of the Jawor Sports Club "Olimpia".

== Political career ==
Her political engagement started in 1980 when Witek joined "Solidarity". She faced temporary arrest for three months in 1982 due to her opposition activities. During the early 1990s, she was an active member of the Citizens' Movement for Democratic Action. She served on the Jaworsk municipal council from 2002 to 2005 and made an unsuccessful bid for mayor in 2002.

Witek initially ran for the Sejm on the Law and Justice party list in the 2001 parliamentary elections but was unsuccessful. However, she was elected to the Sejm of the fifth term in the Legnica constituency in the 2005 elections and successfully defended her seat in subsequent elections, including in 2007, receiving 9,666 votes, and in 2011, obtaining 9,381 votes.

In November 2011, she was elected to the political committee of the Law and Justice party. Her roles expanded in 2015 when she became the PiS spokesperson and was re-elected to the Sejm with 22,168 votes. She was appointed minister without portfolio in Beata Szydło's cabinet on 16 November 2015, taking on additional responsibilities as head of the Prime Minister's political cabinet and Council of Ministers spokesperson, a role she held until 8 January 2016. She returned to the ministerial position without portfolio in the cabinet of Mateusz Morawiecki on 11 December 2017, and was dismissed from the Council of Ministers a week later. On 4 June 2019 she was appointed Minister of the Interior and Administration and was also appointed to the Social Dialogue Council.

=== Tenure as Marshal of the Sejm ===
On 9 August 2019, following her resignation from the Council of Ministers, Witek was elected as the Marshal of the Sejm, receiving 245 votes. In the October parliamentary elections of the same year, she was re-elected as an MP with 46,171 votes. On 12 November 2019, at the first sitting of the 9th Sejm, she was elected Marshal of the Sejm, securing 314 votes.

Her tenure as Marshal was marked by significant controversy, particularly surrounding the vote on amendments to the Polish Broadcasting Act, which triggered widespread public protests. Despite initial defeat, she controversially ordered a resumption of the vote on the adjournment of the sitting, a decision that received negative assessments from parts of the journalistic community and some legal experts.

Witek concluded her term as Marshal of the Sejm on 12 November 2023.

=== Political activity since 2023 ===
Following the 2023 elections, Witek was re-elected as an MP, securing 89,172 votes. On 13 November 2023 the Law and Justice (PiS) party nominated her once again for the post of Marshal of the Sejm. However, she was defeated by Szymon Holownia, the candidate from Poland 2050, who was supported by a coalition of the Polish People's Party, the Civic Coalition, the Confederation, and the Left, with a vote count of 193 to 265. On the same day, she was also nominated by her party for the position of Deputy Marshal of the Sejm, but she did not secure the post, receiving 203 votes.

== Personal life ==
She is the daughter of Florian, a baker, and Eleonora, a dressmaker. She was married to Stanislaw Witek, also a historian and history teacher, from 1980 until his death in 2024. Together, they have two daughters: Marta, a gym teacher born in 1983, and Gabriela, a kindergarten teacher born in 1991.

== Orders and honours ==
- 2013: Cross of Freedom and Solidarity
- 2022: Order of Prince Yaroslav the Wise

== See also ==
- Members of Polish Sejm 2005–2007

Political offices
Preceded by Joachim Brudziński	Minister of the Interior and Administration; 2019	Succeeded by Mariusz Kamiński
Preceded by Marek Kuchciński	Marshal of the Sejm; 2019–2023	Succeeded by Szymon Hołownia
