= Deputy Marshal of the Sejm =

Deputy role within the Polish government

Deputy Marshal of the Sejm of the Republic of Poland
- Wicemarszałek Sejmu Rzeczypospolitej Polskiej
- Presidum of the Sejm
- Seat: Sejm and Senate Complex of Poland, Warsaw
- Appointer: The Sejm
- Inaugural holder: Jakub Bojko, Andrzej Maj, Jędrzej Moraczewski, Stanisław Osiecki, Józef Ostachowski, Stanisław Nowicki, Zygmunt Seyda
- Formation: 1919

Deputy Marshal of the Sejm of the Republic of Poland (Polish: Wicemarszałek Sejmu RP) is a person elected to preside over Sejm (Polish lower chamber of parliament) sessions when the Sejm Marshal is not presiding. Throughout the course of the Third Republic, there have always been several Deputy marshals, usually elected from some or all of the various parliamentary caucuses, rather than from the Government majority (although governing parties always have a majority in the Sejm Presidium, which is composed of the Marshal and Deputy Marshals).

== Third Republic ==
=== 10th term (2023–2027) ===
- Krzysztof Bosak (Confederation) since 13 November 2023
- Włodzimierz Czarzasty (New Left) 13 November 2023 – 18 November 2025
- Dorota Niedziela (Civic Platform) since 13 November 2023
- Monika Wielichowska (Civic Platform) since 13 November 2023
- Piotr Zgorzelski (Polish People's Party) since 13 November 2023
- Szymon Hołownia (Polska 2050) since 18 November 2025
- Marcin Horała (Rozwój Plus) since 18 September 2026

Under Marshals Szymon Hołownia and Włodzimierz Czarzasty

=== 9th term (2019–2023) ===
- Włodzimierz Czarzasty (Democratic Left Alliance/New Left)
- Małgorzata Gosiewska (Law and Justice)
- Małgorzata Kidawa-Błońska (Civic Platform)
- Ryszard Terlecki (Law and Justice)
- Piotr Zgorzelski (Polish People's Party)

Under Marshal Elżbieta Witek

=== 8th term (2015–2019) ===
- Małgorzata Gosiewska (Law and Justice) since 12 June 2019
- Beata Mazurek (Law and Justice) 9 January 2018 - 4 June 2019
- Joachim Brudziński (Law and Justice) 12 November 2015 - 9 January 2018
- Ryszard Terlecki (Law and Justice) since 12 November 2015
- Małgorzata Kidawa-Błońska (Civic Platform) since 12 November 2015
- Stanisław Tyszka (Kukiz’15) 12 November 2015 - 12 November 2019
- Barbara Dolniak (Modern) 12 November 2015 - 12 November 2019

Under Marshals Marek Kuchciński and Elżbieta Witek

=== 7th term (2011–2015) ===
- Cezary Grabarczyk (Civic Platform) (until 22 September 2014)
- Elżbieta Radziszewska (Civic Platform) (from 24 September 2014)
- Marek Kuchciński (Law and Justice)
- Wanda Nowicka (Your Movement)
- Eugeniusz Grzeszczak (Polish People's Party)
- Jerzy Wenderlich (Democratic Left Alliance)

Under Marshals Ewa Kopacz, Radosław Sikorski and Małgorzata Kidawa-Błońska

=== 6th term (2007–2011) ===
- Stefan Niesiołowski (Civic Platform)
- Krzysztof Putra (Law and Justice) (until 10 April 2010, death)
- Jerzy Szmajdziński (Left and Democrats) (until 10 April 2010, death)
- Jarosław Kalinowski (Polish People's Party) (until 10 June 2009)
- Ewa Kierzkowska (Polish People's Party) (from 18 June 2009)
- Jerzy Wenderlich (Democratic Left Alliance) (from 8 July 2010)
- Marek Kuchciński (Law and Justice) (from 4 August 2010)

Under Marshals Bronisław Komorowski and Grzegorz Schetyna

=== 5th term (2005–2007) ===
- Janusz Dobrosz (League of Polish Families) - elected to replace Marek Kotlinowski, elected to the Constitutional Tribunal
- Jarosław Kalinowski (Polish People's Party)
- Bronisław Komorowski (Civic Platform)
- Wojciech Olejniczak (Democratic Left Alliance)
- Genowefa Wiśniowska (Samoobrona) - elected to replace Andrzej Lepper, when he became Deputy Prime Minister
- Andrzej Lepper (Samoobrona)
- Marek Kotlinowski (League of Polish Families)

Under Marshals Marek Jurek and Ludwik Dorn

=== 4th term (2001–2005) ===
- Andrzej Lepper (Samoobrona) - removed from office by Sejm
- Tomasz Nałęcz (Labour Union)
- Kazimierz Ujazdowski (Law and Justice) - elected later
- Janusz Wojciechowski (Polish People's Party) - elected later to the European Parliament)
- Józef Zych - elected to replace Wojciechowski
- Donald Tusk

Under Marshals Marek Borowski, Józef Oleksy and Włodzimierz Cimoszewicz

=== 3rd term (1997–2001) ===
- Marek Borowski (Democratic Left Alliance)
- Jan Król (Freedom Union)
- Franciszek Stefaniuk (Polish People's Party)
- Stanisław Zając (Solidarity Electoral Action)

Under Marshal Maciej Płażyński

=== 2nd term (1993–1997) ===
- Marek Borowski (Democratic Left Alliance)
- Włodzimierz Cimoszewicz (Democratic Left Alliance)
- Olga Krzyżanowska (Freedom Union)
- Aleksander Małachowski (Labour Union)
- Józef Zych (Polish People's Party)

Under Marshals Józef Oleksy and Józef Zych

=== 1st term (1991–1993) ===
- Henryk Bąk (Polish People's Party - People's Agreement)
- Andrzej Kern (Centre Agreement)
- Jacek Kurczewski (Democratic Union)
- Dariusz Wójcik (Confederation of Independent Poland)
- Józef Zych (Polish People's Party)

Under Marshal Wiesław Chrzanowski

== See also ==
- Deputy Marshal of the Senate of the Republic of Poland
- Speaker pro tempore
