= Marzena Małek =

Polish politician, civil servant, manager (born 1976)

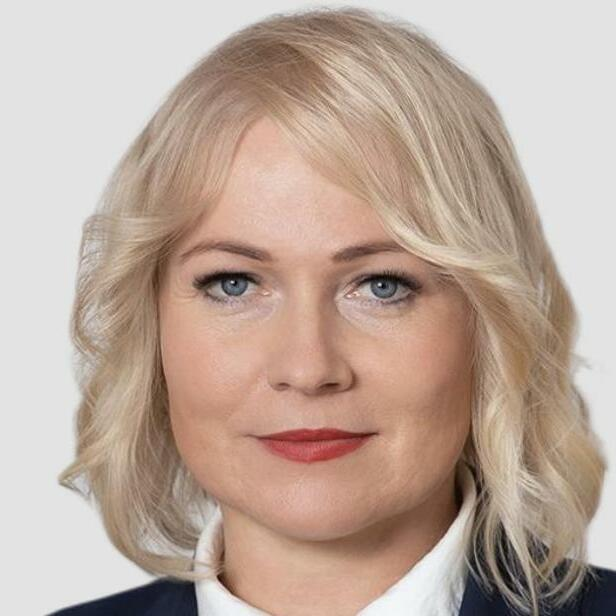
- Official portrait, 2023

Minister of State Assets
- In office 27 November 2023 – 13 December 2023
- Prime Minister: Mateusz Morawiecki
- Preceded by: Jacek Sasin
- Succeeded by: Borys Budka

Personal details
- Born: August 6, 1976 (age 49) Warsaw, Poland
- Party: PiS

Marzena Teresa Małek (Polish pronunciation: [maˈʐɛna ˈmawɛk]; née Dąbrowska; born 6 August 1976) is a Polish civil servant and manager, who briefly served as Minister of State Assets, from 27 November to 13 December 2023 in the Third Cabinet of Mateusz Morawiecki.
