= Małgorzata Gosiewska =

Polish politician (born 1966)

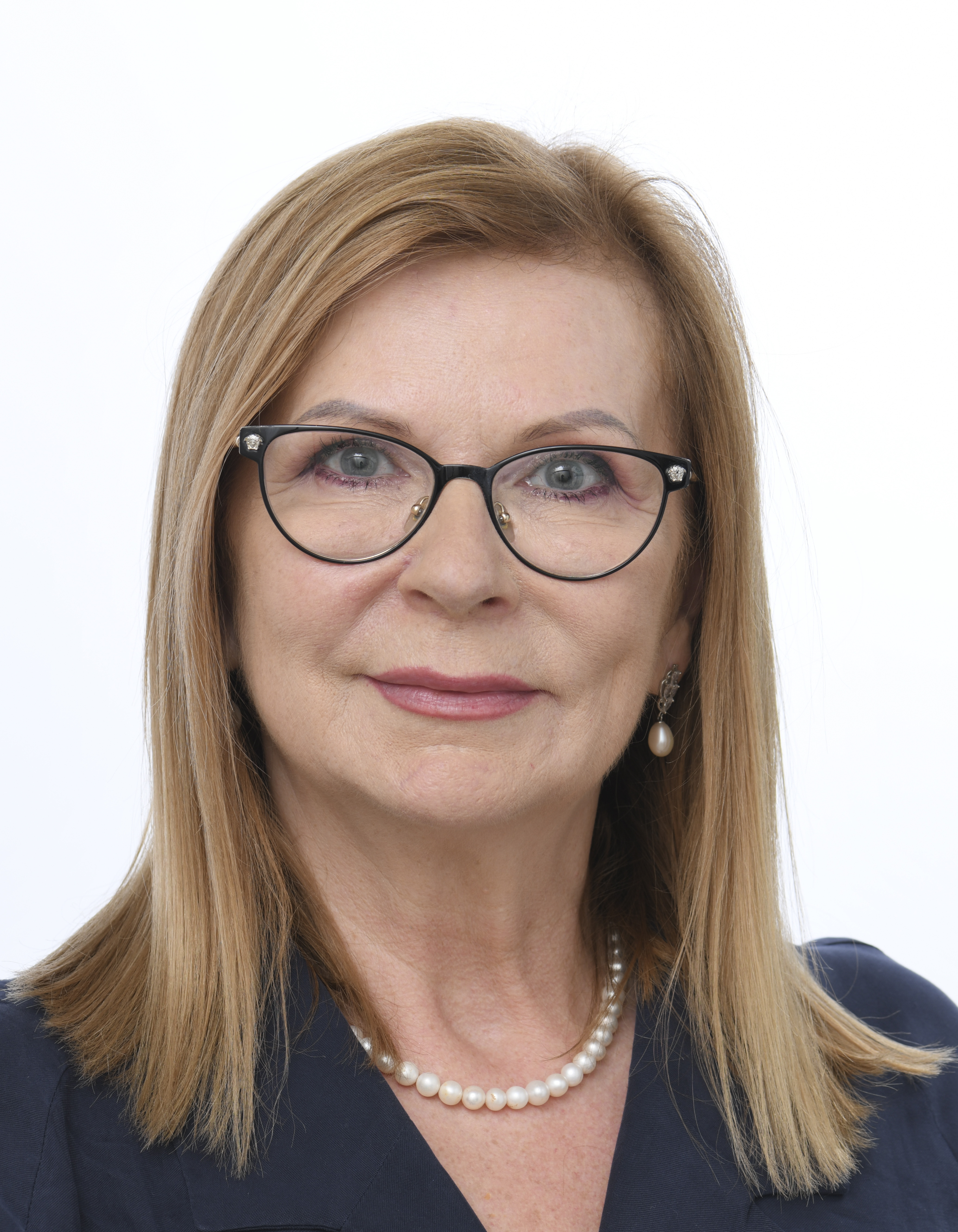
- Official portrait, 2024

Deputy Marshal of the Sejm
- In office 12 June 2019 – 12 November 2023
- Marshal: Marek Kuchciński; Elżbieta Witek

Member of the Sejm
- In office 26 October 2005 – 5 November 2007
- In office 8 November 2011 – 10 June 2024

Member of the European Parliament
- Incumbent
- Assumed office 16 July 2024

Personal details
- Born: 22 July 1966 (age 59) Gdańsk, Poland
- Party: PiS (2001–present)
- Other political affiliations: Solidarity (1990–1991); PC-ZP (1991–2001)
- Spouse: Przemysław Gosiewski (m. 1990, divorced)
- Children: 1

Małgorzata Maria Gosiewska (née Kierat; born 22 July 1966) served as the Deputy Marshal of the Sejm of the Republic of Poland 2019–2023. She was elected to the Sejm on 25 September 2005, getting 4,251 votes in 19 Warsaw district as a candidate from the Law and Justice party list.

Małgorzata Gosiewska was also an expert in the office of President of Poland Lech Kaczyński. Małgorzata Gosiewska was a member of the Masovian Regional Assembly. In 2011, Malgorzata Gosiewska was elected to Polish Sejm - Parliament as MP.

In 2015, team of experts led by Gosiewska published a report on the humanitarian situation during the war in Donbas.

== See also ==
- Members of Polish Sejm 2005-2007
- Members of Polish Sejm 2011-2015
- Members of Polish Sejm 2015-2019
