= Borys Budka =

Polish politician (born 1978)

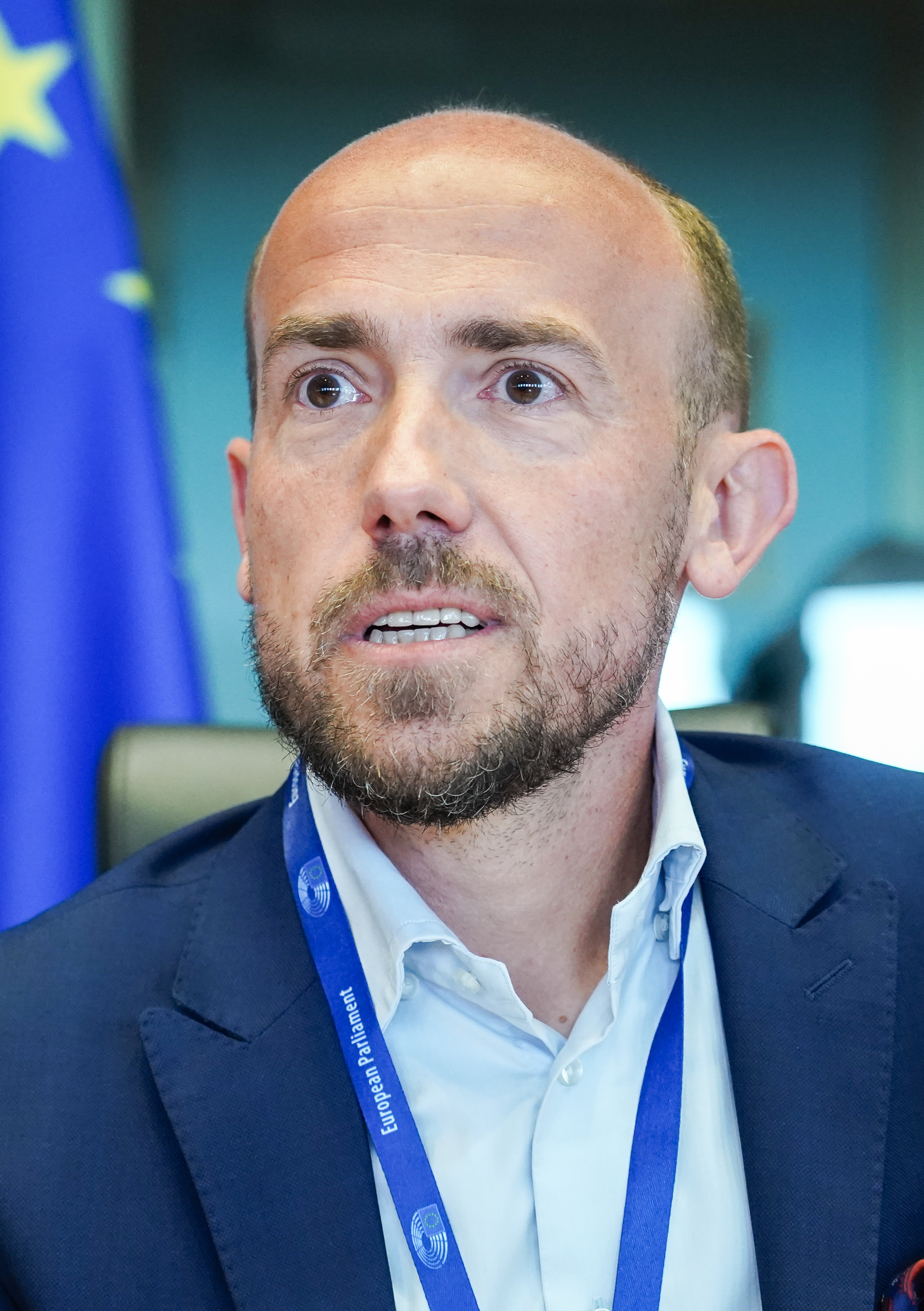
- Budka in 2024

Minister of State Assets
- In office 13 December 2023 – 13 May 2024
- Prime Minister: Donald Tusk
- Preceded by: Marzena Małek
- Succeeded by: Jakub Jaworowski

Chairman of Civic Platform
- In office 29 January 2020 – 3 July 2021
- Deputy: Bartosz Arłukowicz; Ewa Kopacz; Tomasz Siemoniak; Rafał Trzaskowski
- Secretary-General: Robert Tyszkiewicz; Marcin Kierwiński
- Parliamentary Leader: Himself; Cezary Tomczyk
- Preceded by: Grzegorz Schetyna
- Succeeded by: Donald Tusk

Member of The European Parliament for Poland
- Incumbent
- Assumed office 16 July 2024
- Preceded by: Jerzy Buzek
- Constituency: 11 – Silesia

Minister of Justice
- In office 4 May 2015 – 16 November 2015
- Prime Minister: Ewa Kopacz
- Preceded by: Cezary Grabarczyk
- Succeeded by: Zbigniew Ziobro

Member of the Sejm
- In office 8 November 2011 – 10 June 2024
- Succeeded by: Urszula Koszutska
- Constituency: 29 - Gliwice (2011-2019); 31 - Katowice (2019-2024)

Member of the Zabrze City Council
- In office 27 October 2002 – 8 November 2011

Personal details
- Born: 11 March 1978 (age 48) Czeladź, Poland
- Party: Civic Platform
- Other political affiliations: Civic Coalition
- Website: borysbudka.pl

Borys Piotr Budka (Polish pronunciation: [ˈbɔrɨs ˈpjɔtr ˈbutka]; born 11 March 1978) is a Polish politician, member of Sejm of the 7th, 8th and 9th legislature, Minister of Justice in 2015, vice-president of the Civic Platform political party in the 2016–2020 period, leader of the parliamentary political group of Civic Coalition since 2019, leader of the Civic Platform from 2020 to 2021. Elected as a Member of the European Parliament in 2024.

== Life ==
Budka is the son of Józef and Maria Budka. He was born in Czeladź. In 2002, he graduated Faculty of Law and Administration at the University of Silesia in Katowice. In 2007, Budka began practice as Legal Counsel. In 2011, at the University of Economics in Katowice, based on the Kwalifikacje pracownicze w stosunku pracy, he obtained a PhD in economics with a specialization in employment policy. After graduation, he worked as an academic teacher at the Department of Law at the Faculty of Finance and Insurance of the University of Economics.

=== Local Councilor ===
In 2002 he obtained the mandate of a local councilor in Zabrze. In both 2002 and 2010 he was a local councilor belonging to Civic Platform. In 2006 he held the same function again as a member of the local committee. In 2002-2005 he was a vice leader of Gliwice City Council. In 2014, Budka was a candidate for the presidential election of Gliwice. He took third place (6192 votes).

=== Polish Parliament ===
In 2011, Borys Budka obtained a parliamentary mandate (Civic Platform) in Gliwice constituency. He got 10 260 votes. On 30 April 2015, Prime Minister Ewa Kopacz announced his candidacy as Minister of Justice. He held this position on 4 May 2015. In parliament of the 8th term of office, he became a member of the Justice and Human Rights Committee and the Legislative Committee, and also became the co-leader of the Special Committee for Changes in Codifications. He was also appointed by the parliament to the National Council of the Judiciary. On 26 February 2016, Budka held the position of co-leader of Civic Platform's parliamentary club. On 12 November 2019, he became the new leader of the Civic Coalition parliamentary club. On 3 January 2020, he announced his start in the election as leader of the Civic Platform. On 25 January 2020, he was elected chairman of the Civic Platform, defeating Tomasz Siemoniak, Bogdan Zdrojewski and Bartłomiej Sienkiewicz in the first round of elections. He officially took the office on 29 January 2020, when the official election results were announced. He replaced the current party leader Grzegorz Schetyna. In 2020, he officially supported Małgorzata Kidawa-Błońska in the presidential election.

=== European Parliament ===
Elected as a Member of the European Parliament in 2024. He is the Chair

of the Committee on Industry, Research and Energy in the European Parliament.

In November 2026, Budka served as one of the European Parliament's lead negotiators in talks with EU member states that resulted in an agreement to postpone methane emission monitoring and reporting requirements for entity imports until January 2029.

== Private life ==
Budka is married to Katarzyna Kuczyńska-Budka, a local councilor in Gliwice.

He is a long-distance runner, preferring road running. He achieved his lifetime personal best marathon time of 2 hours, 39 minutes, 3 seconds (2:39:03) in the 2009 first edition of the Silesia Marathon.

Party political offices
Preceded by Grzegorz Schetyna	Chairman of the Civic Platform; 2020–2021	Succeeded by Donald Tusk
Political offices
Preceded by Cezary Grabarczyk	Minister of Justice; 2015	Succeeded by Zbigniew Ziobro
