= Zbigniew Chlebowski =

Polish politician (born 1964)

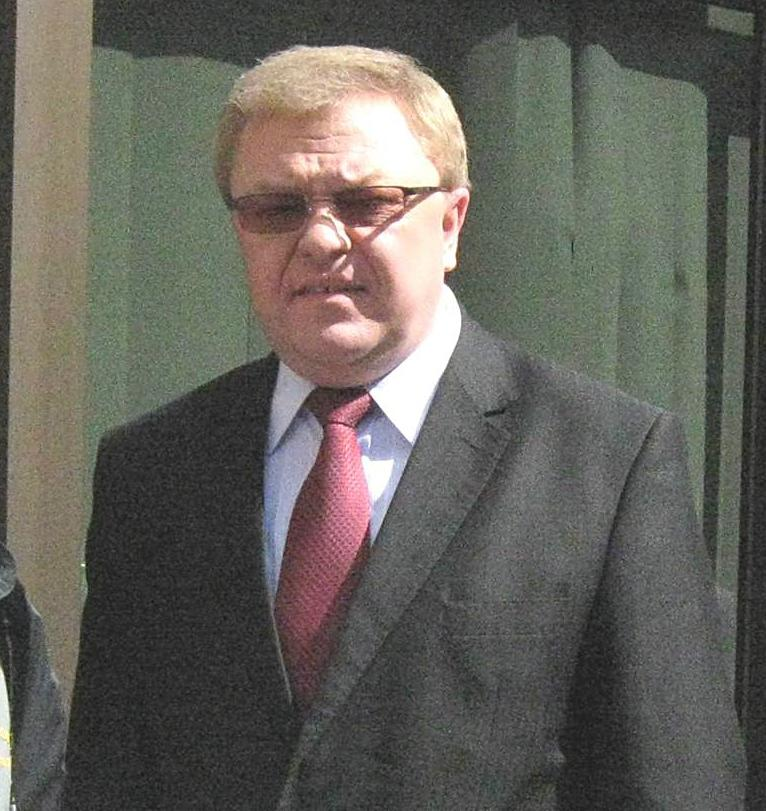

Parliamentary Leader of the Civic Platform 6th Leader of the Civic Platform in the Sejm
- In office 5 November 2007 – 2 October 2009
- Leader: Donald Tusk
- Preceded by: Bogdan Zdrojewski
- Succeeded by: Grzegorz Dolniak (acting)

Member of the Sejm
- In office 19 October 2001 – 7 November 2011
- Constituency: 2 – Wałbrzych

Personal details
- Born: 1964 (age 61–62)
- Party: Independent
- Other political affiliations: Civic Platform (2001–9)

Zbigniew Chlebowski (born 8 March 1964 in Żarów) is a Polish politician. He was elected to the Sejm on 25 September 2005, getting 18,281 votes in 2 Wałbrzych district as a candidate from the Civic Platform list.

He was also a member of Sejm 2001-2005.

== See also ==
- Members of Polish Sejm 2005-2007
