= Przemysław Gosiewski =

Polish politician (1964–2010)

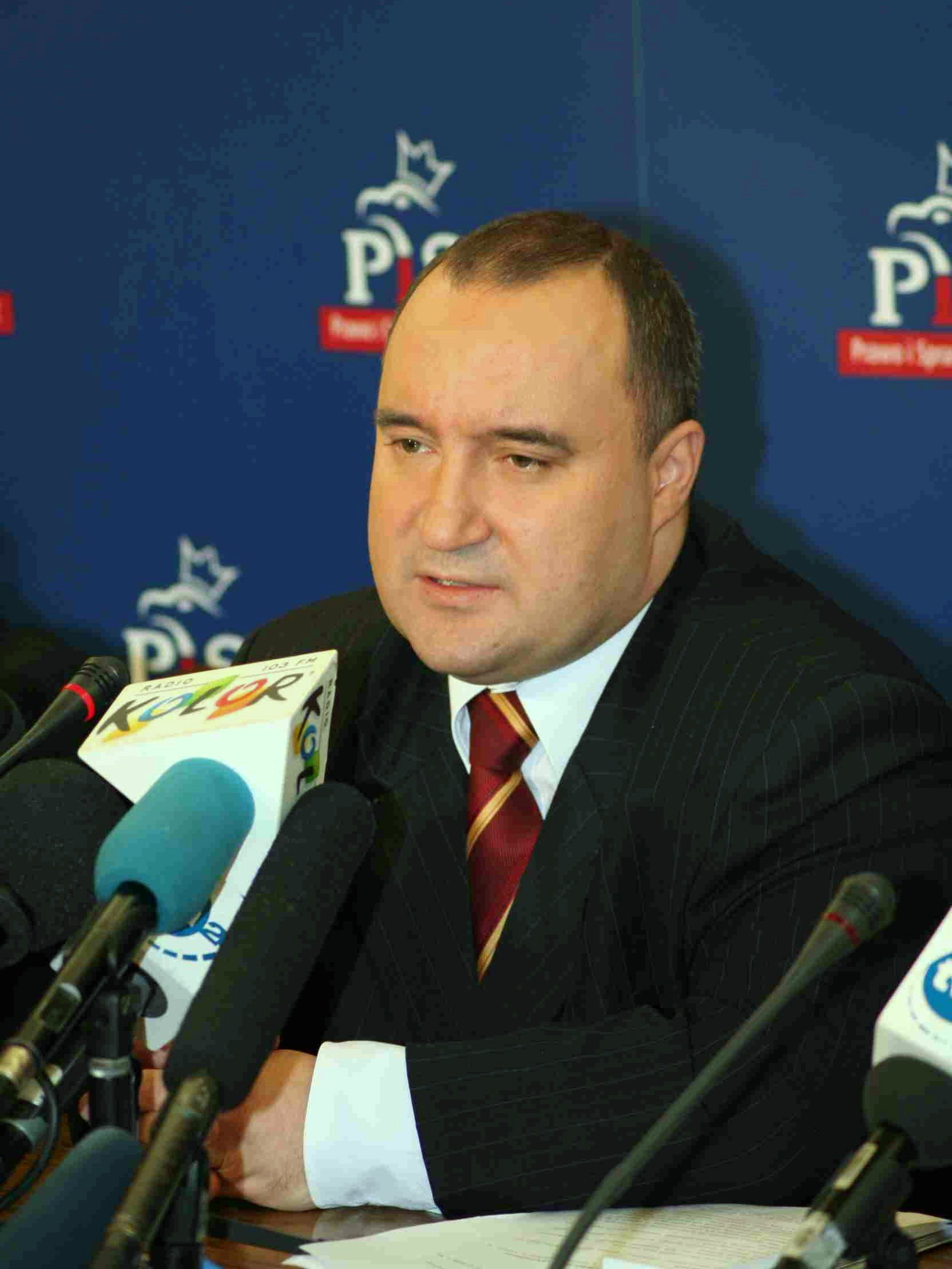

Deputy Prime Minister of Poland
- In office 8 May 2007 – 16 November 2007
- President: Lech Kaczyński
- Prime Minister: Jarosław Kaczyński
- Preceded by: Roman Giertych
- Succeeded by: Waldemar Pawlak; Grzegorz Schetyna

Member of the Sejm
- In office 21 September 2001 – 10 April 2010
- Succeeded by: Bartłomiej Dorywalski
- Constituency: 33 – Kielce

Personal details
- Born: Przemysław Edgar Gosiewski; 12 May 1964 Słupsk, Poland
- Died: 10 April 2010 (aged 45) Smolensk, Russia
- Party: Law and Justice
- Spouse(s): Małgorzata Kierat (divorced) Beata Jabłońska
- Profession: Lawyer

Przemysław Edgar Gosiewski (Note: Polish pronunciation: [pʂɛˈmɨswaf ˈɛdɡar ɡɔˈɕɛfskʲi]) (12 May 1964 – 10 April 2010) was a Polish politician and a deputy chair of Law and Justice (Prawo i Sprawiedliwość) party. In the 1980s he was active in the Solidarity movement. In years 2006-2007 he served as a Deputy Prime Minister of Poland in Jarosław Kaczyński's government.

He was elected to the Sejm in 2001 and reelected on 25 September 2005, receiving 31,253 votes in 33 Kielce district as a candidate on the Law and Justice list.

He was the majority leader between 3 November 2005 and 19 July 2006. He has been a minister (Chairman of the Standing Committee of the Council of Ministers) since 14 July 2006. On 8 May 2007 he became Deputy Prime Minister of Poland and held that position until 11 November 2007.

He was listed on the flight manifest of the Tupolev Tu-154 of the 36th Special Aviation Regiment carrying the President of Poland Lech Kaczyński which crashed near Smolensk-North airport near Pechersk near Smolensk, Russia, on 10 April 2010, killing all aboard.

On 16 April 2010, Gosiewski was posthumously awarded the Commander's Cross with Star of the Order of Polonia Restituta and on 29 April 2010, the City Council in Ostrowiec made him an honorary citizen.

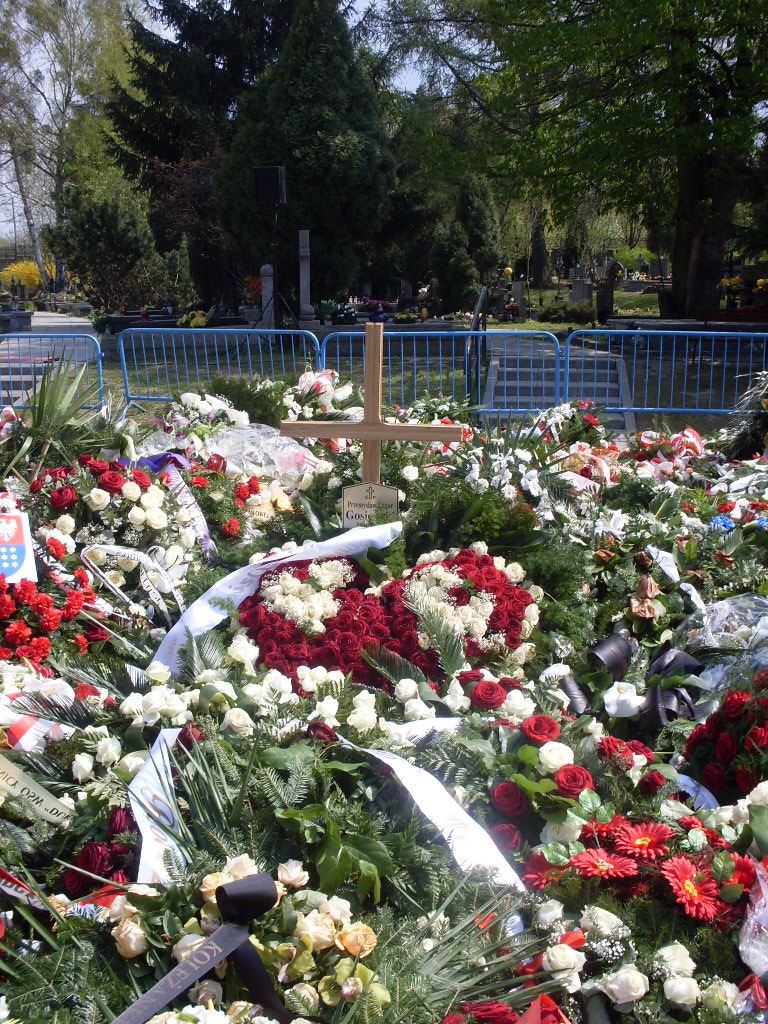
Grave of Przemysław Gosiewski after burial

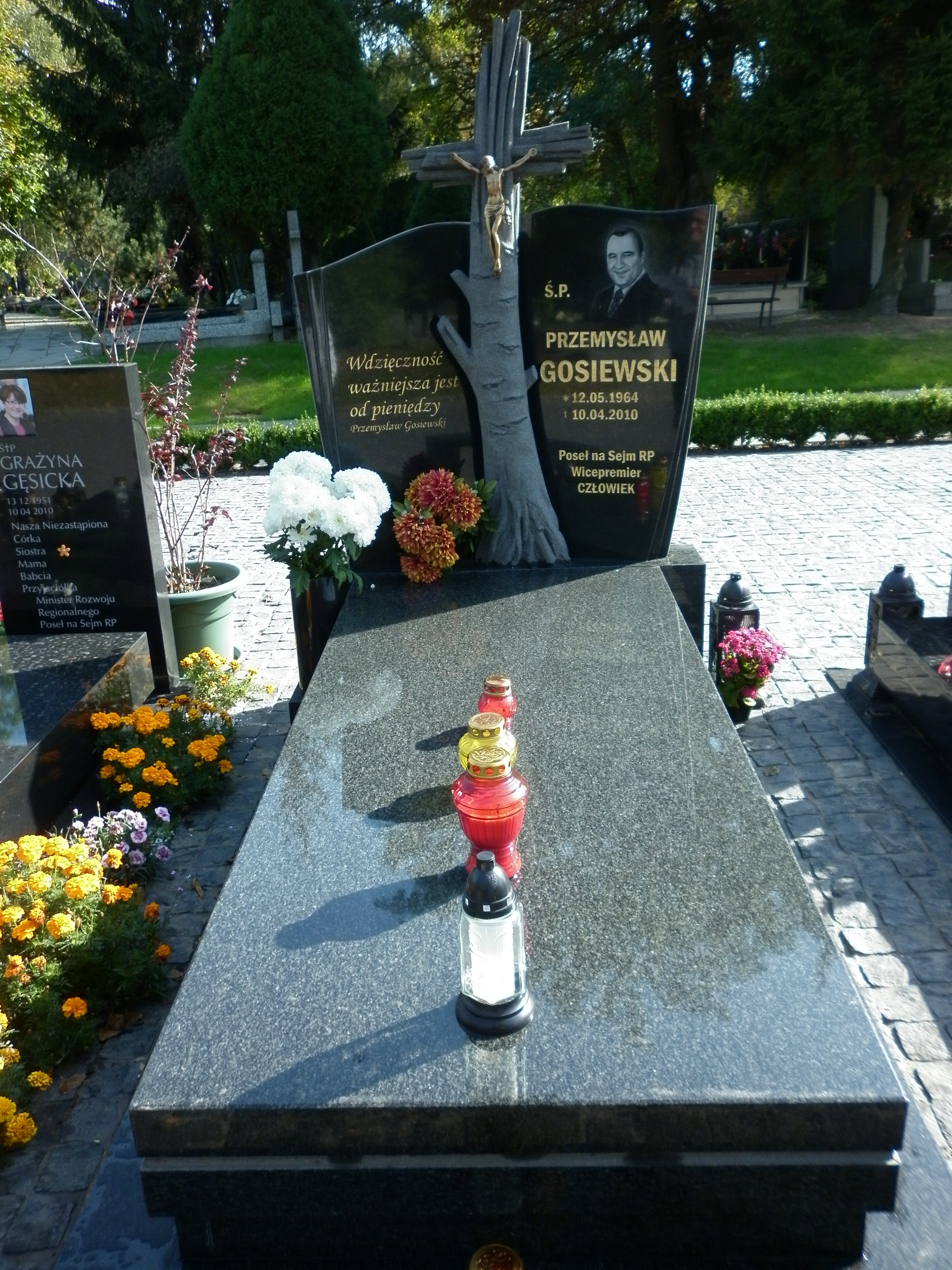
Grave of Przemysław Gosiewski at Military Powązki Cemetery in 2012

== See also ==
- Members of Polish Sejm 2005-2007
- Members of Polish Sejm 2007-2011
