= Joachim Brudziński =

Polish politician (born 1968)

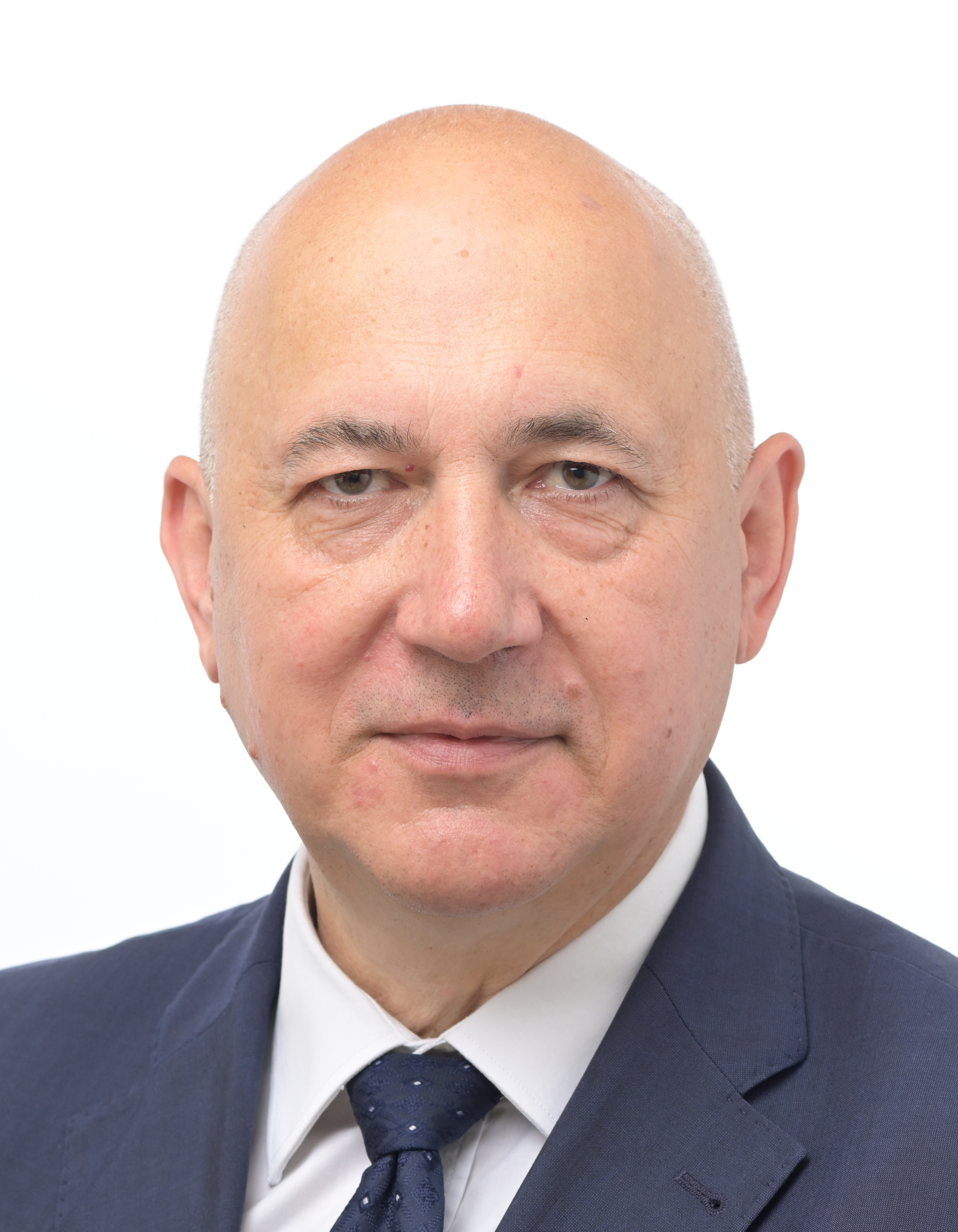

Minister of the Interior
- In office 9 January 2018 – 4 June 2019
- Prime Minister: Mateusz Morawiecki
- Preceded by: Mariusz Błaszczak
- Succeeded by: Elżbieta Witek

Deputy Marshal of the Sejm
- In office 12 November 2015 – 9 January 2018

Personal details
- Born: 4 February 1968 (age 58) Świerklaniec, Poland
- Party: Law and Justice
- Education: University of Szczecin

Joachim Stanisław Brudziński (born 4 February 1968 in Świerklaniec) is a Polish conservative politician. He was elected (first time) to the Sejm on 25 September 2005, getting 14,731 votes in 41 Szczecin district as a candidate from the Prawo i Sprawiedliwość (Law and Justice) list. Brudziński graduated from the political sciences faculty of the University of Szczecin. Sailor, journalist and PhD student of the University of Poznań. Presently president of executive committee (earlier secretary general) of the ruling party Law and Justice, he is well known for his "down to earth" and family oriented perspectives of global politics.

In 2018, Brudziński joined the Polish cabinet as the Minister of the Interior after Mariusz Błaszczak, the previous Interior Minister, became the Minister of National Defence. He is a Member of the European Parliament.

In 2020, Brudziński tweeted that "Poland is the most beautiful without LGBTs".

Brudziński is married with two daughters and a son.

== See also ==
- List of Sejm members (2005–2007)
