= Michał Szczerba =

Polish politician

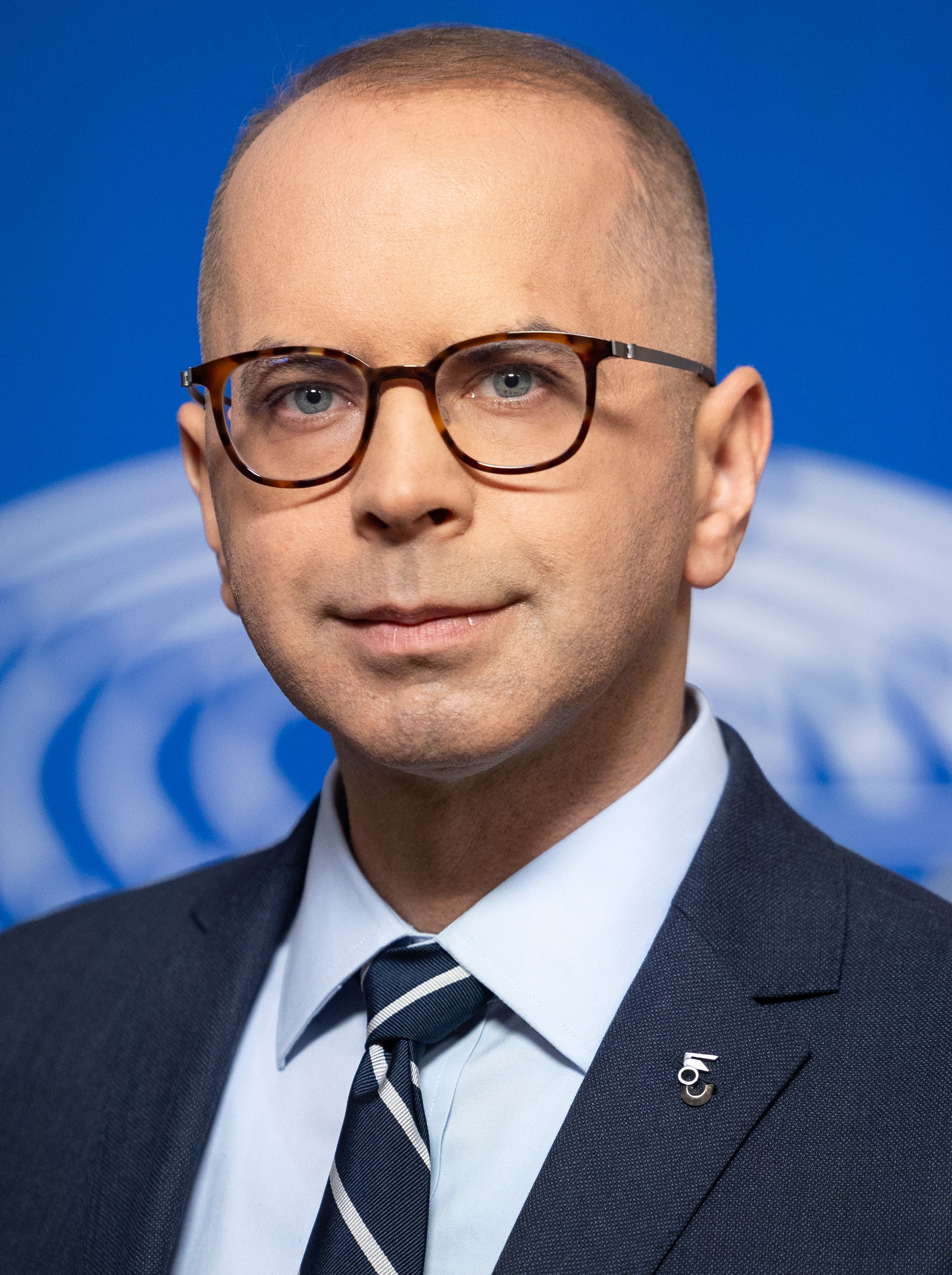
- Official portrait, 2025

Member of the European Parliament
- Incumbent
- Assumed office 16 July 2024

President of the NATO Parliamentary Assembly
- In office 3 October 2023 – 21 June 2024
- Preceded by: Joëlle Garriaud- Maylam
- Succeeded by: Gerry Connolly (acting)

Member of the Sejm
- In office 4 October 2007 – 10 June 2024

Personal details
- Born: Michał Roch Szczerba; 14 December 1977 (age 48) Warsaw, Poland
- Party: Civic Platform (since 2002)
- Other political affiliations: Civic Coalition (2018–present)

Michał Roch Szczerba (born 14 December 1977) is a Polish politician, member of Polish parliament since 2007 (reelected in 2011, 2015, 2019 and 2023) from the Civic Coalition. Elected as a Member of the European Parliament in 2024.

In 2016 his actions were one of the triggers of the December 2016 Polish protests.

In October 2023, he was elected as the President of the NATO Parliamentary Assembly.
