= Zbigniew Meres =

Polish politician (1952–2023)

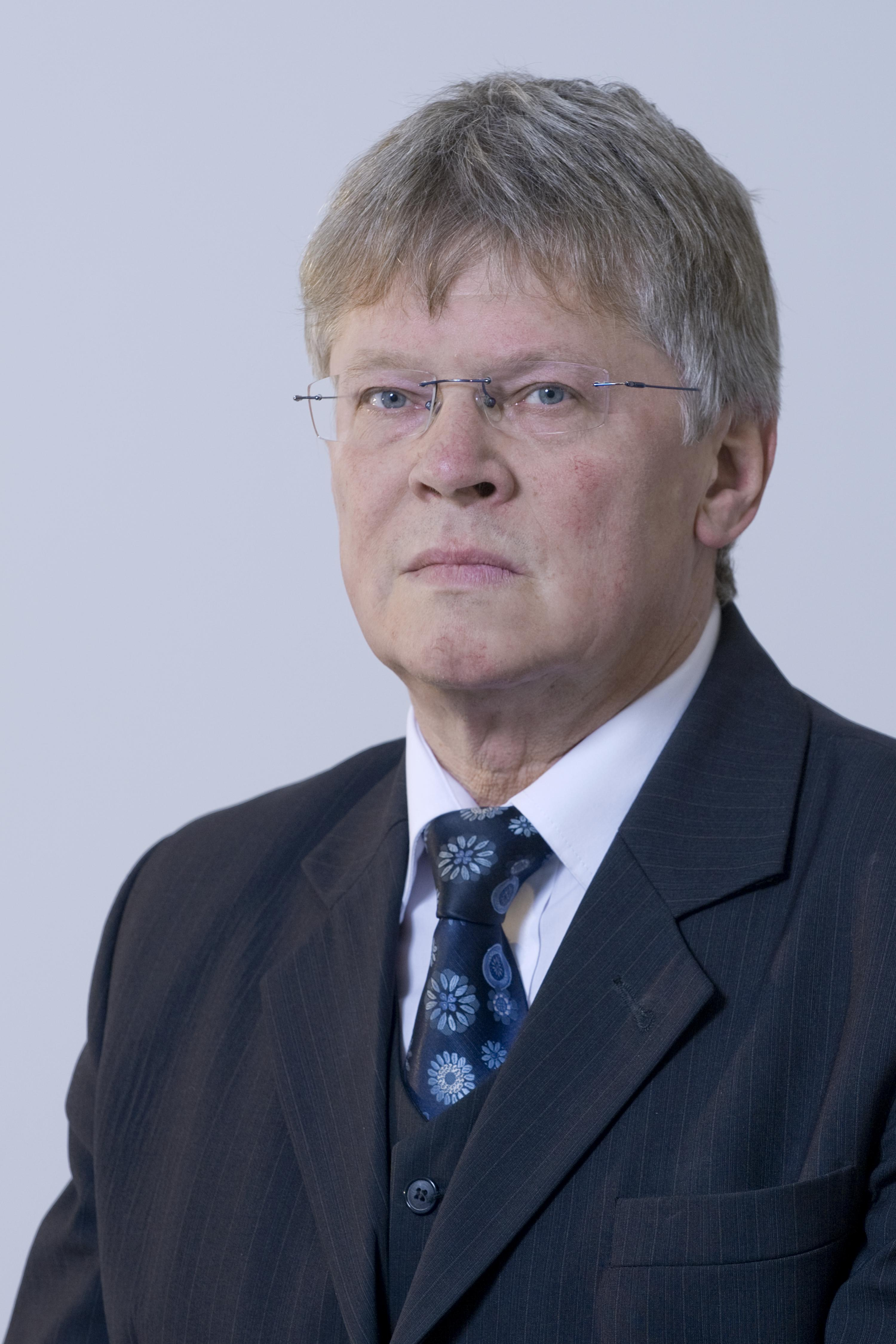
- Meres in 2011

Member of the Senate of Poland
- In office 5 November 2007 – 11 November 2015
- Preceded by: Czesław Żelichowski
- Succeeded by: Arkadiusz Grabowski
- Constituency: Senate district no. 31 (2007–2011); Senate district no. 76 (2011–2015)

Personal details
- Born: Zbigniew Henryk Meres; 18 January 1952 Dąbrowa Górnicza, Poland
- Died: 14 November 2023 (aged 71)
- Party: PO
- Education: Main School of Fire Service
- Occupation: Firefighter

Zibigniew Henryk Meres (18 January 1952 – 14 November 2023) was a Polish firefighter and politician. A member of the Civic Platform, he served in the Senate from 2007 to 2015.

Meres died on 14 November 2023, at the age of 71.
