= Beata Mazurek =

Polish politician (born 1967)

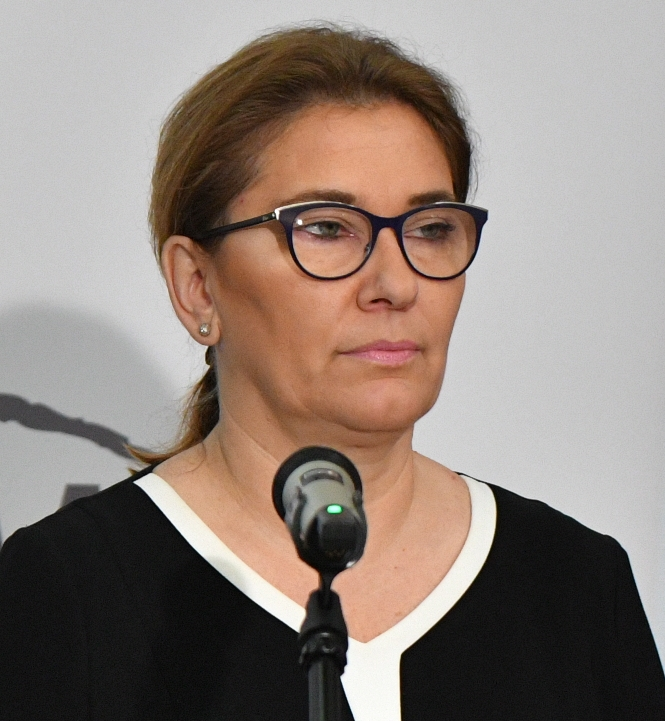

Member of the European Parliament
- In office July 2, 2019 – July 15, 2024

Deputy Marshal of the Sejm
- In office January 9, 2018 – June 4, 2019

Personal details
- Born: 19 October 1967 (age 58) Ostrów Mazowiecka, Poland
- Party: Law and Justice
- Children: 2 (sons)
- Education: John Paul II Catholic University of Lublin; Pułtusk Academy of Humanities
- Website: beatamazurek.pl

Beata Mazurek, née Cieluch (born 19 October 1967 in Ostrów Mazowiecka) is a Polish politician. She was elected to the Sejm on 25 September 2005, getting 7,012 votes in 7 Chełm district as a candidate from the Law and Justice list. After Law and Justice won the parliamentary election in 2015 she became a spokeswoman in December 2015.

== See also ==
- Politics of Poland
