= Stanisław Osiecki =

Polish politician

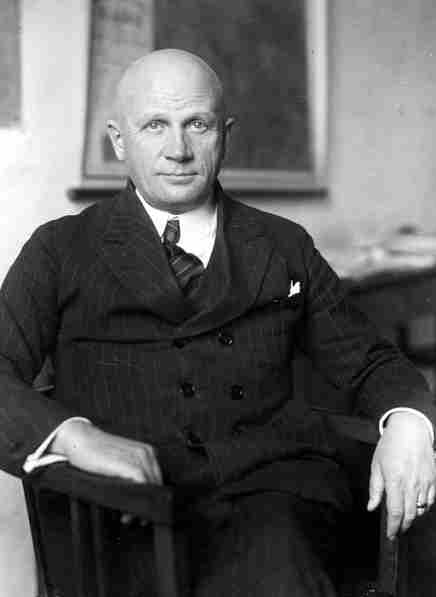
Stanisław Osiecki

Stanisław Osiecki (20 May 1875 in Ciechanów - 12 May 1967 in Warsaw) was a Polish politician. Activist of the peasant movements, member of the Polish People's Party, he was a deputy to Polish Sejm both before and after World War II, and a minister in several cabinets of the Second Polish Republic (minister of agriculture in 1923; minister of trade and industry in 1925–1926).
