= Robert Tyszkiewicz =

Polish politician

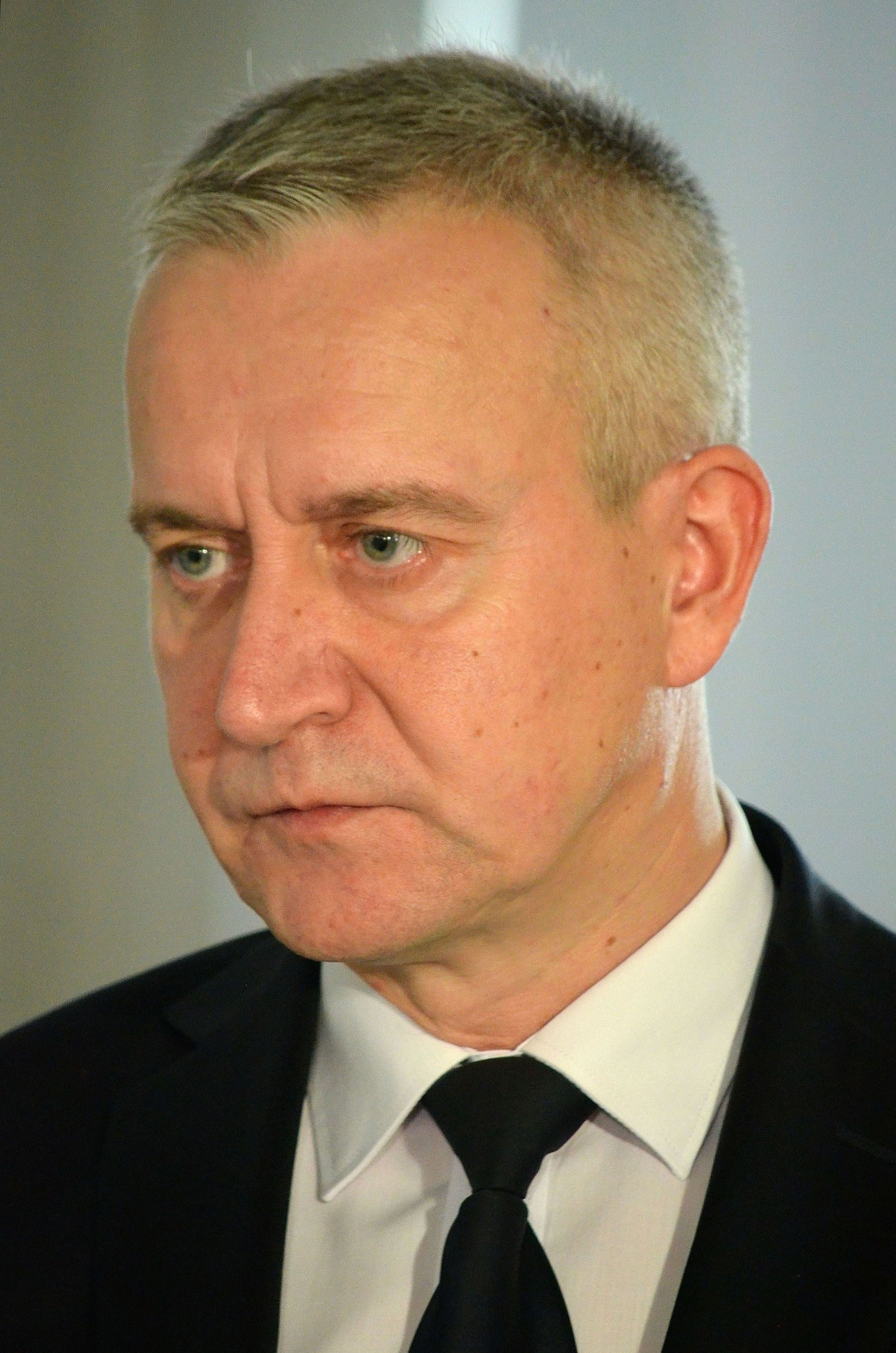

Member of the Sejm
- In office 25 September 2005 – 12 November 2023
- Constituency: 24 – Białystok

Personal details
- Born: 1963 (age 62–63)
- Party: Civic Platform

Robert Tyszkiewicz (born 7 June 1963 in Białystok) is a Polish politician. He was elected to the Sejm on 25 September 2005, receiving 13,232 votes in 24 Białystok district as a candidate from the Civic Platform list and served as the member of the Sejm until 2023.

== See also ==
- Members of Polish Sejm 2005-2007
