= Ryszard Terlecki =

Polish politician

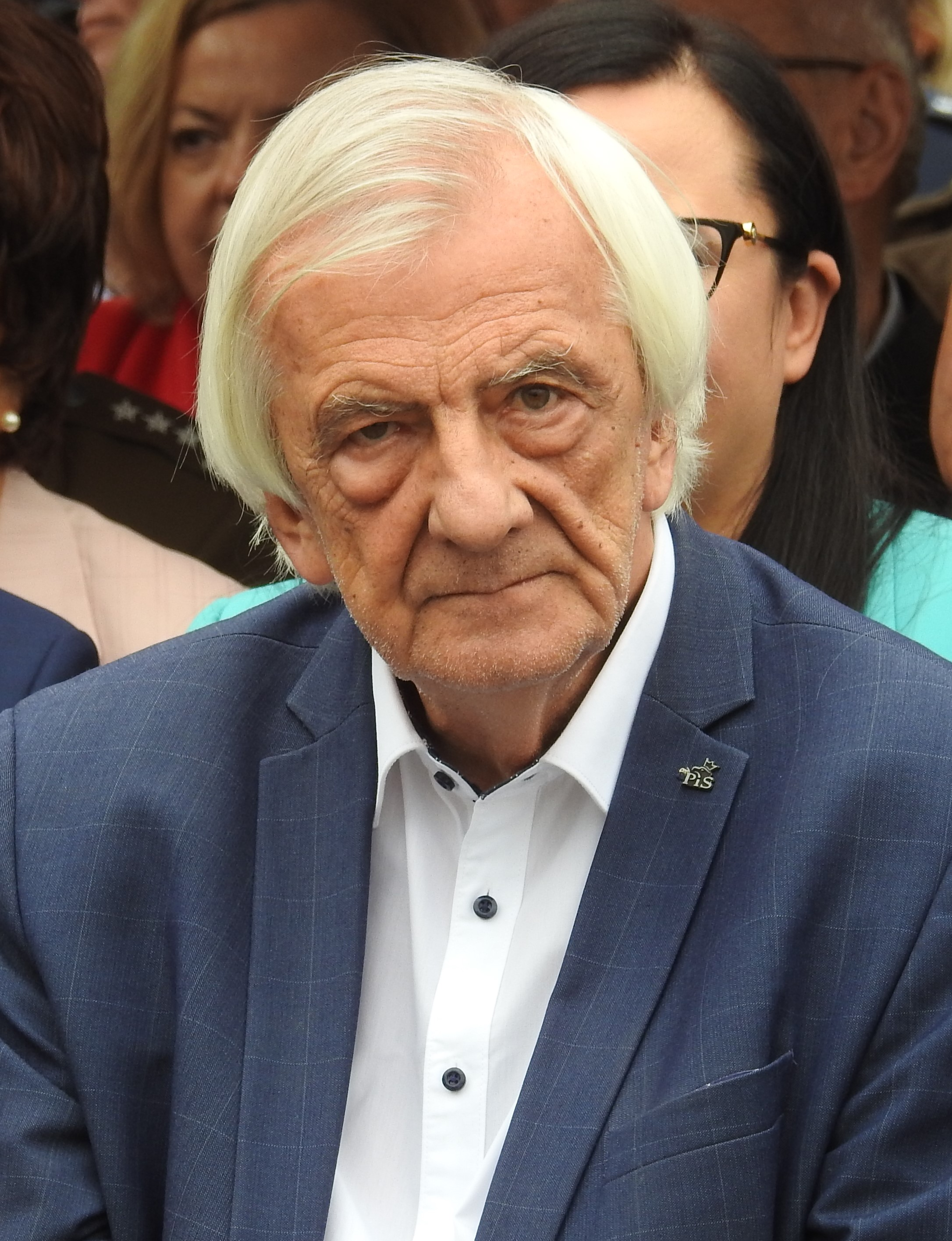

Deputy Marshal of the Sejm
- In office 12 November 2015 – 12 November 2023

Head of the Law and Justice Parliamentary Caucus
- In office 10 November 2015 – 12 November 2023
- Preceded by: Mariusz Błaszczak
- Succeeded by: Mariusz Błaszczak

Personal details
- Born: Ryszard Iwon Terlecki; 2 September 1949 (age 77) Kraków, Poland
- Party: Law and Justice
- Other political affiliations: Development Plus (since 2026)
- Children: 3
- Education: Jagiellonian University
- Profession: Historian
- Website: Official website

Ryszard Iwon Terlecki (born 2 September 1949) is a Polish politician, the Parliamentary Caucus Head of the Law and Justice party between 2015–2023. Terlecki, a historian and professor of humanities, lectures at the Pontifical University of John Paul II. He is a member of the Sejm, serving since 2007. He served as the Deputy Marshal of the Sejm of the Republic of Poland 2015–2023.

== Personal life ==
He is the son of writer and journalist Olgierd Terlecki who was a secret collaborator of the Security Service in PRL for 35 years, and his wife Janina. In his youth, he was a participant in the hippie movement and one of the precursors of this youth subculture in Poland. He was known in the environment under the pseudonym Pies (pol. Dog). Then he took part in opposition movements - as a co-worker of Workers' Defence Committee, member of "Solidarity" independent trade union, and journalist in underground press. He was married twice, and has three children from his first marriage.
