= Olga Krzyżanowska =

Polish politician (1929–2018)

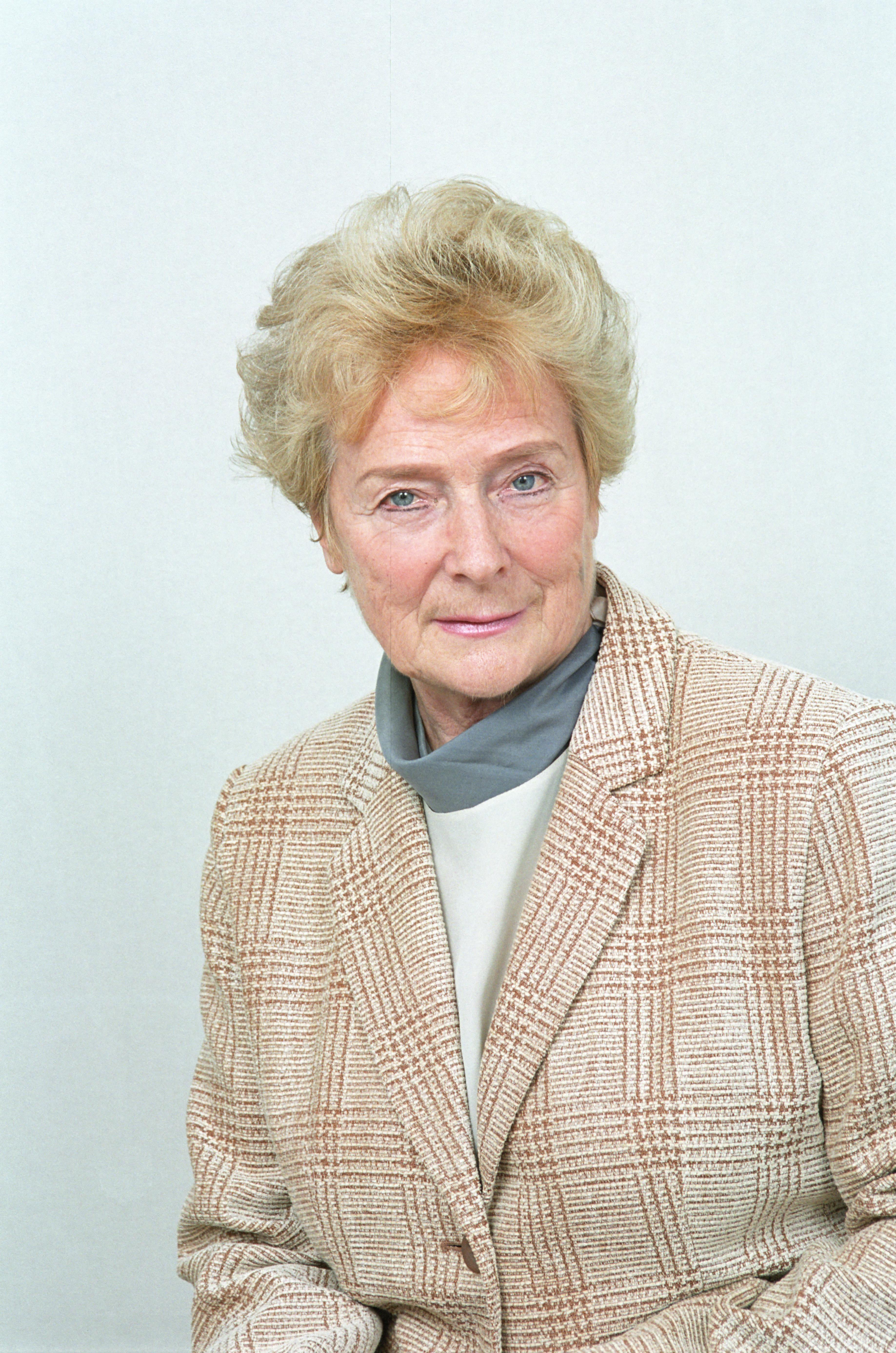

Senator of Poland
- In office 20 October 2001 – 19 October 2005

Deputy Marshal of the Sejm
- In office 19 September 1993 – 20 October 1997

Personal details
- Born: 10 September 1929 Warsaw, Poland
- Died: 22 June 2018 (aged 88) Gdańsk, Poland
- Party: Solidarity Citizens' Committee, Democratic Union, Freedom Union

Olga Teresa Krzyżanowska (10 September 1929 – 22 June 2018) was a Polish politician who served as a Senator of Poland and a Member of the Sejm from 1989 to 2005. During World War II, she was part of the Gray Ranks, which led to her being awarded the Cross of Valour for her efforts. After World War II, she attended Gdańsk Medical University, and graduated from there in 1952 with a focus in internal and occupational diseases. After spending a decade in hospitals, in 1962 Krzyżanowska became head of the Provincial Industrial Hospital in Gdańsk, and remained in that role until 1989.

Krzyżanowska joined the Solidarity movement in the 1980s, and was part of their National Health Commission; working through the commission was what got her into politics. She became a member of the Contract Sejm and was named Deputy Marshal for that term; she found out her nomination to the position from watching television. In 1993 she was again nominated to be a Deputy Marshal, and remained in the Sejm until 2001. During her time in the Sejm, she served as chair of the Ethics Committee and was vice-chair of the Committee on Foreign Affairs, and was also chair of the Rules and Deputies' Affairs Committee.

In 2001, Krzyżanowska ran for Senate in the Gdańsk district on behalf of the Senate 2001 alliance, which she won. She served one term, retiring from politics in 2005. That year she became chairwoman of the National Memory Association, and in 2011 she joined the Congress of Women, a Polish political and social movement, serving as the Minister of Health in the organization's shadow cabinet.
