= Grzegorz Schetyna =

Polish politician (born 1963)

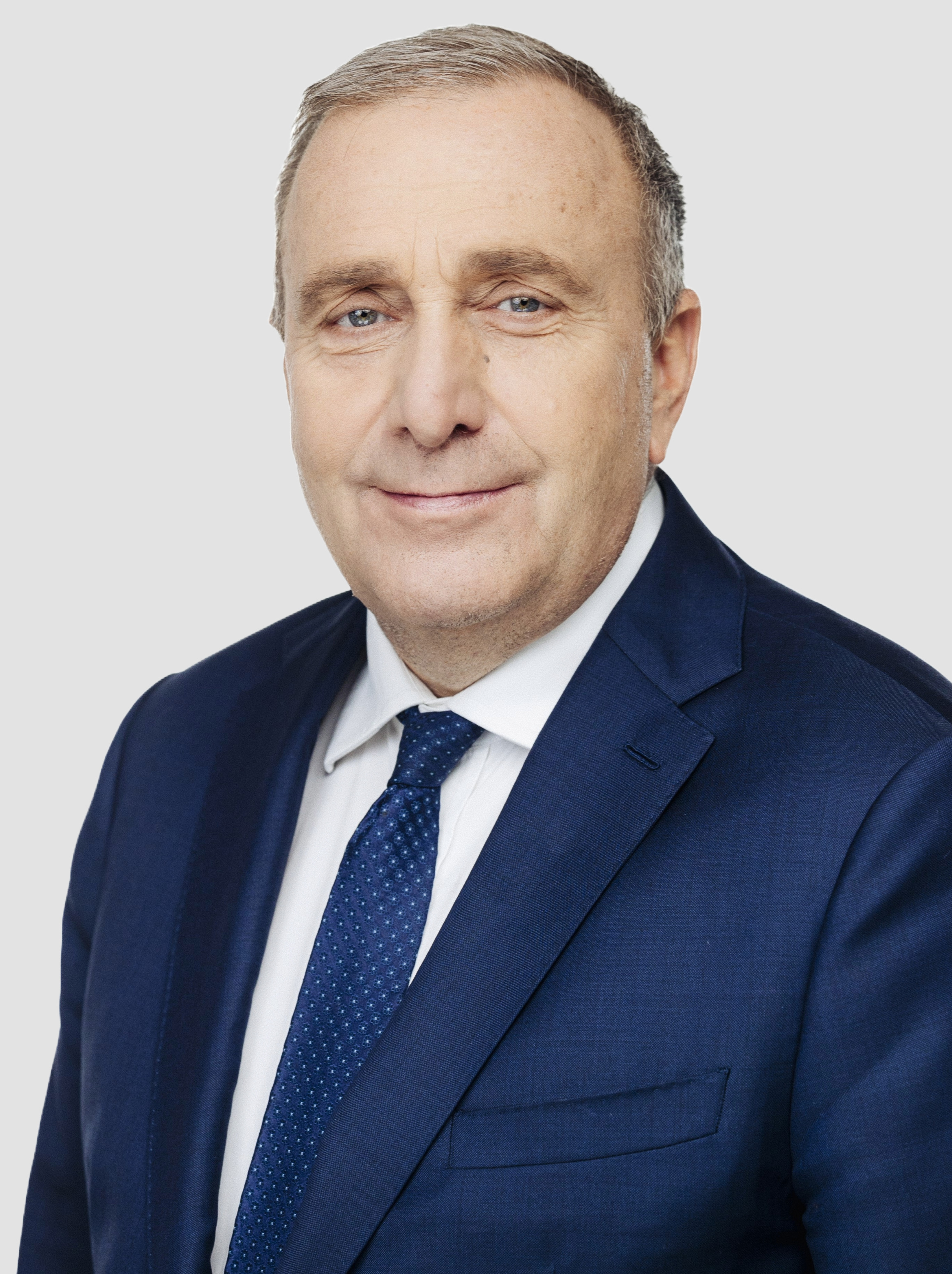
- Grzegorz Schetyna in 2023

Acting President of Poland
- In office 8 July 2010 – 6 August 2010
- Prime Minister: Donald Tusk
- Preceded by: Bogdan Borusewicz (Acting)
- Succeeded by: Bronisław Komorowski

Chairman of Civic Platform
- In office 26 January 2016 – 29 January 2020
- Secretary-General: Stanisław Gawłowski; Robert Tyszkiewicz
- Parliamentary Leader: Sławomir Neumann; Borys Budka
- Preceded by: Ewa Kopacz
- Succeeded by: Borys Budka

Minister of Foreign Affairs
- In office 22 September 2014 – 16 November 2015
- Prime Minister: Ewa Kopacz
- Deputy: Rafał Trzaskowski
- Preceded by: Radosław Sikorski
- Succeeded by: Witold Waszczykowski

Marshal of the Sejm
- In office 8 July 2010 – 8 November 2011
- Preceded by: Bronisław Komorowski
- Succeeded by: Ewa Kopacz

Parliamentary Leader of Civic Platform
- In office 9 October 2009 – 22 July 2010
- Leader: Donald Tusk
- Preceded by: Grzegorz Dolniak (Acting)
- Succeeded by: Tomasz Tomczykiewicz

Deputy Prime Minister of Poland
- In office 16 November 2007 – 13 October 2009
- Prime Minister: Donald Tusk
- Preceded by: Przemysław Gosiewski
- Succeeded by: Waldemar Pawlak

Minister of the Interior and Administration
- In office 16 November 2007 – 13 October 2009
- Prime Minister: Donald Tusk
- Preceded by: Władysław Stasiak
- Succeeded by: Jerzy Miller

Member of the Senate
- Incumbent
- Assumed office 12 November 2023

Member of the Sejm
- In office 19 October 2005 – 12 November 2023

Personal details
- Born: Grzegorz Juliusz Schetyna; 18 February 1963 (age 63) Opole, Poland
- Party: Civic Platform
- Other political affiliations: Liberal Democratic Congress (1991–1994); Freedom Union (1994–2001)
- Spouse: Kalina Rowińska-Schetyna
- Children: 1
- Education: University of Wrocław

Grzegorz Juliusz Schetyna (Polish pronunciation: [ˈɡʐɛɡɔʂ sxɛˈtɨna]; born 18 February 1963) is a Polish politician who was Leader of Civic Platform and Leader of the Opposition from 26 January 2016 to 25 January 2020. He has served as Minister of Foreign Affairs of Poland from 2014 to 2015, Marshal of the Sejm from 2010 to 2011, Acting President of Poland 2010, Deputy Prime Minister of Poland from 2007 to 2009 and Minister of the Interior and Administration 2007 to 2009. He has been a Member of the Sejm from 1997.

== Early career ==
In the early 1990s, Schetyna co-founded a commercial broadcaster, Radio Eska, and chaired the Śląsk Wrocław basketball team in 1994–97.

== Political career ==
=== Early beginnings ===
In the late 1980s, Schetyna headed the University of Wrocław’s branch of the Independent Students’ Union, the student arm of the Solidarność (Solidarity) trade-union movement, before holding a series of posts in the Liberal-Democratic Congress and then the Freedom Union party in the 1990s, along with Donald Tusk and several other key figures in Polish politics. When Tusk co-founded Civic Platform in 2001, Schetyna became secretary-general.

Schetyna was first elected to the Sejm as a candidate of the Freedom Union in the national elections on 21 September 1997 after receiving 13 013 (3,17%) in 50 Wrocław district. Following the 2007 parliamentary election, he served as Deputy Prime Minister and Minister of Internal Affairs and Administration under Prime Minister Donald Tusk. As interior minister, he championed the badly needed renovation of provincial roads in Poland. In a 2009 cabinet reshuffle, he left the government abruptly amid tensions between his faction within the ruling Civic Platform party and Tusk.

Schetyna was also a member of Sejm 1997–2001, Sejm 2001–2005, Sejm 2005–2007, Sejm 2007–2011.

After stepping down, he moved to the post of head of the Civic Platform Sejm caucus.

=== Marshal of the Sejm ===
Following Bronisław Komorowski's victory in the 2010 presidential election, Schetyna was nominated as the Civic Platform's candidate to succeed the President-elect as the Marshal of the Sejm.

On 8 July he was elected Marshal of the Sejm and thus assumed the post of the Acting President of Poland. Schetyna served as the interim head of state until Komorowski's inauguration on 6 August 2010.

Schetyna ceased being Sejm Marshal on 8 November 2011; Ewa Kopacz replaced him and later took his job as the Civic Platform's first deputy leader.

=== Sejm Committee on Foreign Affairs ===
Between 2011 and 2014, Schetyna served as chairman of the Committee on Foreign Affairs. Shortly after the referendum on the status of Crimea held on 16 March 2014, he and his counterparts of the Weimar Triangle parliaments – Elisabeth Guigou of France and Norbert Röttgen of Germany – visited Kyiv to express their countries’ firm support of the territorial integrity and the European integration of Ukraine. This was the first time that parliamentarians of the Weimar Triangle had ever made a joint trip to a third country.

During Tusk's seven years in power, Schetyna tried several times to challenge him but was sidelined. By 2014, news media reported about increased rivalry and tension between him and Tusk.

=== Minister of Foreign Affairs ===
When Tusk stepped down from his position in September 2014 to become the President of the European Council, Schetyna announced he would run for leadership of the Civic Platform. This was widely seen as a direct challenge to incoming Prime Minister Ewa Kopacz, as by tradition the prime minister is also party leader.

For domestic political reasons Kopacz therefore decided to replace Foreign Minister Radosław Sikorski with Schetyna. Unlike his predecessor in the job, Schetyna was unknown outside Poland at the time. Upon taking office, Kopacz ordered him to redraft Poland's foreign policy urgently and present it to parliament.

In February 2015, Schetyna announced that Poland would be the first country to pay damages for participating in the US Central Intelligence Agency’s secret rendition program after it was found to have hosted a facility used for illegal rendition and interrogation. In doing so, Poland followed a ruling of the European Court of Human Rights ordering it to pay former detainees Abd al-Rahim al-Nashiri and Abu Zubaydah.

In September 2015, Schetyna summoned the Russian ambassador to Poland, Sergey Andreyev, after the ambassador, in an interview aired by private broadcaster TVN24, said Poland was partly responsible for Nazi Germany invading in 1939 because it had repeatedly blocked the formation of a coalition against Berlin in the run-up to the conflict.

=== Leader of Civic Platform ===
As Civic Platform chairman, Schetyna and the party’s other lawmakers occupied the main hall in parliament from mid-December 2016 and mid-January 2017 over the ruling PiS party’s plans to limit media access and a vote on the budget which the Civic Platform said was held illegally. He also led the party’s campaign for the 2019 European Parliament election by warning that the ruling eurosceptic PiS party could eventually lead the country out of the EU.

Ahead of the 2019 national elections, Schetyna led his party’s move to join forces with two small, liberal groupings and announced Małgorzata Kidawa-Błońska as their candidate for prime minister.

In January 2020, Schetyna announced that he won't stand in the 2020 Civic Platform leadership election and endorsed Tomasz Siemoniak. On 25 January 2020 his successor, Borys Budka, was elected.

== See also ==
- Members of Polish Sejm 2005–2007
- Members of Polish Sejm 2007–2011

Political offices
Preceded by Władysław Stasiak	Minister of the Interior and Administration; 2007–2009	Succeeded by Jerzy Miller
Preceded by Bogdan Borusewicz; Acting	Acting President of Poland; 2010	Succeeded by Bronisław Komorowski; President
Preceded by Bronisław Komorowski	Marshal of the Sejm; 2010–2011	Succeeded by Ewa Kopacz
Preceded by Radosław Sikorski	Minister of Foreign Affairs; 2014–2015	Succeeded by Witold Waszczykowski
Party political offices
Preceded by Grzegorz Dolniak; Acting	Leader of the Civic Platform in the Sejm; 2009–2010	Succeeded by Tomasz Tomczykiewicz
Preceded by Ewa Kopacz	Leader of the Civic Platform; 2016-2020	Succeeded by Borys Budka
