= COVID-19 pandemic in Poland =

- Disease: COVID-19
- Pathogen: SARS-CoV-2
- Location: Poland
- First outbreak: Wuhan, Hubei, China
- Index case: Zielona Góra, Lubusz Voivodeship
- Arrival date: 4 March 2020 (6 years and 7 months)
- Confirmed cases: 6,843,989
- Recovered: 6,398,305 (updated 23 July 2023)
- Deaths: 121,221
- Fatality rate: 1.77%
- Vaccinations: 22,984,544 (total vaccinated); 22,705,868 (fully vaccinated); 58,634,590 (doses administered)

The COVID-19 pandemic in Poland was part of the COVID-19 pandemic. COVID-19 is caused by SARS-CoV-2. As of 8 June 2025, Poland had a cumulative total of 6,780,272 confirmed cases (17,862 per 100,000 population), and 120,980 deaths (319 per 100,000 population) due to COVID-19.

The first COVID-19 vaccine product was introduced on 23 December 2020. Since then, a total of 58.63 million vaccine doses have been administered, with 60% of the population having received a complete primary series and 34% having received at least one booster dose as of 31 December 2023.

In February and March 2020, health authorities in Poland carried out laboratory testing of suspected cases of infection by SARS-CoV-2, as well as home quarantine and monitoring. On 4 March 2020, the first laboratory-confirmed case in Poland was announced in a man hospitalised in Zielona Góra. On 10 March 2020, the World Health Organization declared the local transmission phase of SARS-CoV-2 in Poland. On 12 March 2020, the first death from coronavirus disease 2019 (COVID-19) in Poland was that of a 57-year-old woman.

Polish authorities opted into the European Union's tender procedure for purchasing COVID-19 pandemic-related medical equipment on 17 March 2020.

On 10–12 March 2020 lockdown-type control measures were implemented, closing school and university classes, offices, and cancelling mass events, and were strengthened on 25 March, limiting non-family gatherings to two people and religious gatherings to six and forbidding non-essential travel. On 20 March 2020, the Ministry of Health officially declared an epidemic and on the same day tried to prevent medical personnel from commenting on the pandemic. The Polish Ombudsman Adam Bodnar defended medical personnel's right to speak publicly about the epidemic on constitutional grounds of freedom of speech and the right of the public to information. Doctors opposed the self-censorship orders.

Lockdown restrictions were tightened on 31 March 2020 by a government regulation, requiring individuals walking in streets to be separated by two metres, closing parks, boulevards, beaches, hairdressers and beauty salons, and forbidding unaccompanied minors from leaving their homes. Restrictions were relaxed starting 20 April, allowing religious gatherings and funerals to be held for up to a maximum of 50 people. Starting on 1 April 2020, fatalities which were clinically or epidemiologically diagnosed as COVID-19 (U07.2) were also considered as COVID-19 deaths by NIPH–NIH.

== Timeline ==
=== Monitoring, February 2020 ===
During January 2020, Warsaw Chopin Airport carried out special screening measures for passengers arriving from China. In February and March 2020, health authorities in Poland carried out laboratory testing of suspected cases of infection by SARS-CoV-2, as well as home quarantine and monitoring. In February 2020, four-member teams at the National Institute of Public Health – National Institute of Hygiene (NIPH–NIH) together with the Berlin hospital Charité carried out 307 genetic tests of samples from suspected SARS-CoV-2 carriers. NIPH–NIH carried out the tests in its Warsaw laboratory and in the Wojewódzki Szpital Zakaźny in Warsaw. Diagnostic laboratories in eight other towns were being prepared to make similar analyses. The Ministry of Health refused to state how many test kits were available in Polish laboratories. On 19 February 2020, twelve people remained hospitalised "in connection with the coronavirus", 13 were under home quarantine and 1,000 were being monitored by health services. On 27 February 47 people remained hospitalised with suspected SARS-CoV-2 infection, 55 were under home quarantine and 1,570 were being monitored by health services. Polish Minister of Health Łukasz Szumowski stated on 27 February that he expected laboratory-confirmed positive SARS-CoV-2 cases in the following days.

=== March 2020 ===
==== New law: "specustawa", March 1, 2020 ====
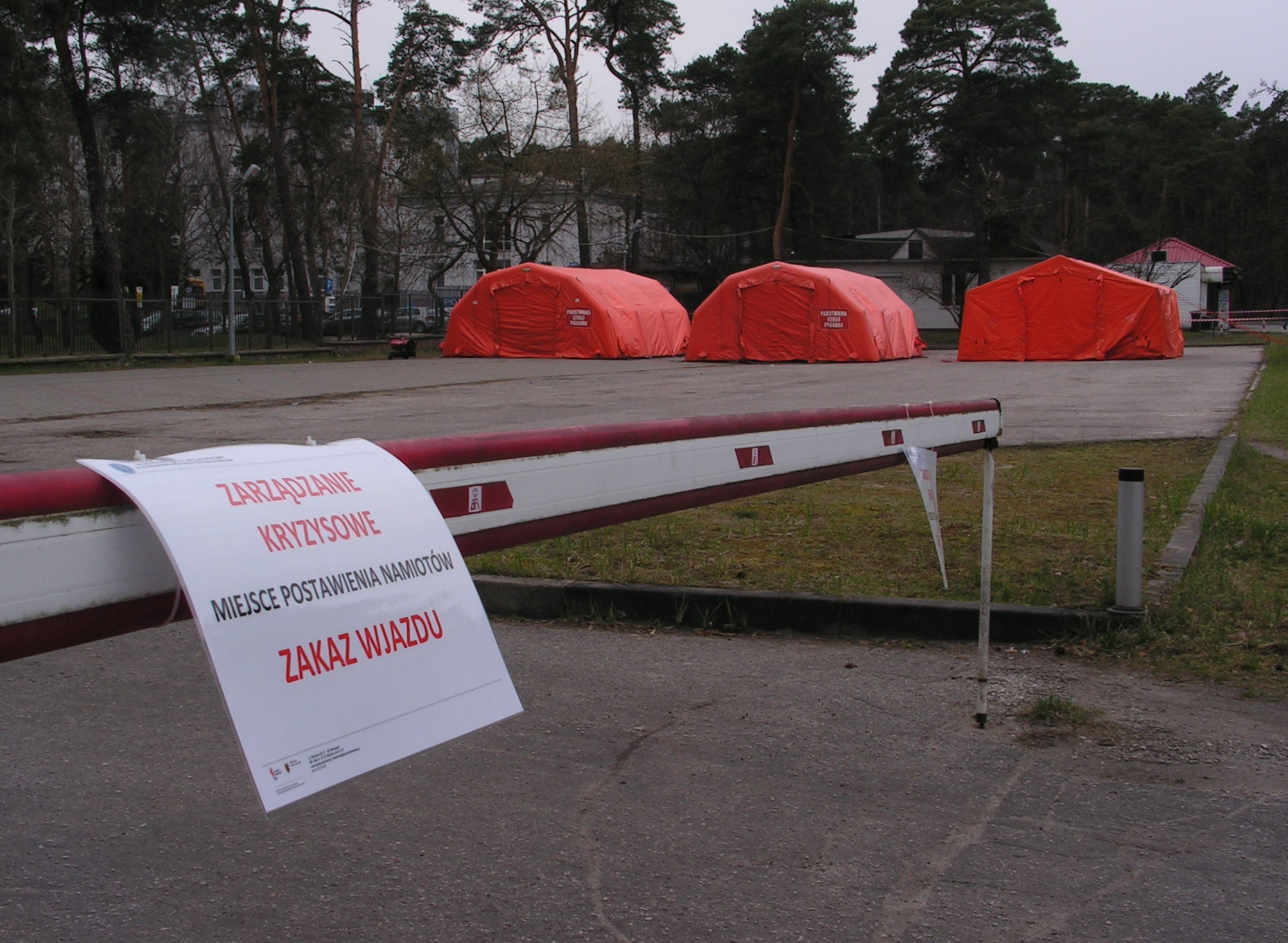
Medical tents in front of a hospital in Włocławek for examining patients suspected of SARS-CoV-2 infection (March 2020).

On 1 and 2 March 2020 new law (nicknamed Polish: specustawa, lit. special law) to manage a possible epidemic of COVID-19 or other infectious diseases in Poland via administrative, budgetary and epidemiological measures passed through a first reading by a parliamentary committee and through second and third readings by the Polish lower house of parliament, the Sejm, with 400 votes out of 418 in favour in the third reading. Konfederacja was the only parliamentary club which voted against the measure. Philosopher and law professor Jerzy Zajadło praised the discussion of the bill in the Sejm, in that the Speaker allowed members of parliament to discuss the bill under the principles of deliberative democracy, which he judged rare for the parliament dominated by PiS. Zajadło criticised the bill as establishing vague powers with little chance of checks and balances, which he saw as being in the spirit of the approach of the political party in power; he saw the bill as establishing a permanent state of emergency for COVID-19 and all other contagious diseases; he criticised the wide array of changes implied in the law as having consequences difficult to predict; and he judged the law to be unnecessary given that laws covering the situation already existed. Ewa Łętowska, a former judge in the Polish Constitutional Tribunal, also criticised the law as effectively creating a new, 180-day long state of emergency, in addition to the state of emergency rules defined in the Polish Constitution for a maximum of 90 days. She interpreted the law as giving the authorities arbitrary power without control by administrative courts.

==== First cases ====
On 3 March 2020 a total of 559 SARS-CoV-2 tests had been run for people in Poland suspected of SARS-CoV-2 infection, all with negative results, while the numbers of people home quarantined and monitored increased and the number of hospitalised, suspected cases dropped.

On 4 March 2020 the Minister of Health claimed that nine laboratories were carrying out SARS-CoV-2 testing (NIPH–NIH and Voivodeship Infectious Disease Hospital in Warsaw, and laboratories in Olsztyn, Wrocław, Poznań, Katowice, Rzeszów, Gdańsk and Kielce), while OKO.press claimed that only four laboratories were carrying out the testing. The Minister claimed that "sanitary–epidemiological stations" in Lublin, Łódź and Poznań would start SARS-CoV-2 tests the following day. On 6 March, the Minister stated that 13 laboratories were running SARS-CoV-2 tests.

The first lab-confirmed case of SARS-CoV-2 in Poland was announced on 4 March 2020, out of 584 tests in total. The patient, a 66-year-old man, returned from a visit to Westphalia in Germany by bus to Świecko and from there by private car to Cybinka. He telephoned a general practitioner. He was taken by ambulance to a hospital in Zielona Góra, where he arrived around midday 2 March. On the evening of 2 March, a sample from the patient was sent for analysis to Warsaw. The result was known to be positive during the night of 3 to 4 March, and announced by the Minister of Health at 8:00 local time on 4 March. OKO.press criticised the delay of 44 hours from the patient's arrival at the hospital to the announcement of the positive test result as excessive. Close contacts of the patient were home quarantined. The Minister of Health requested the media to respect the patient's privacy.

On 6 March 2020 Polish Minister of Health Łukasz Szumowski announced the confirmation of four new cases: one hospitalised in Ostróda, linked to "patient zero" from Cybinka (the two had travelled in the same bus); two patients in Szczecin who had returned by car from Italy; and one patient in Wrocław who had returned from the United Kingdom (UK). On 7 March, another SARS-CoV-2 case, of another person who had travelled in the bus together with "patient-zero", was announced by the Minister of Health as lab-confirmed.

On 8 March 2020 the Ministry of Health reported two new cases of SARS-CoV-2 infection. One person was hospitalised in Warsaw and another in Racibórz (Silesian Voivodeship). Both were in good condition. In the evening, the Ministry confirmed another three positive test results, increasing the daily case count to five new cases. The patients were hospitalised in Warsaw, Wrocław and Racibórz: one elderly person, one middle-aged and one young. The elderly person (hospitalised in Wrocław) was in serious condition.

On 9 March 2020 Polish Minister of Health Łukasz Szumowski announced the confirmation of five new cases. Three cases were confirmed in Racibórz, one in Kraków, one in Wrocław and one in Poznań, bringing the total number of confirmed SARS-CoV-2 cases in Poland to 17.

==== Local transmission, 10 – 27 March 2020 ====
On 10 March 2020, the mode of SARS-CoV-2 transmission in Poland was officially declared by the World Health Organization as having shifted from imported cases only to local transmission. and the same day, Armed Forces General Commander gen. Jarosław Mika was diagnosed and the eighteenth confirmed SARS-CoV-2 infection was announced in the Masovian Voivodeship. The two SARS-CoV-2 patients earlier announced in Warsaw were both seriously ill with COVID-19.

On 16 March 2020, the number of confirmed cases increased to 177 and the death toll to 4. One of those infected was Minister of the Environment Michał Woś.

On 17 March 2020, "patient zero", at Zielona Góra hospital, tested negative for SARS-CoV-2 for the second time, and was considered to have recovered. On 20 March 2020, the Ministry of Health officially declared an epidemic. As of 29 March 2020, there were 269,307 people under quarantine for suspected SARS-CoV-2 infection and 42,783 SARS-CoV-2 tests had been made since the beginning of testing.

==== Nursing home and hospital clusters, March 2020 ====
On 17 March 2020 a doctor at a hospital in Grójec, "Z.", had a dry cough and fever and had a sample taken for SARS-CoV-2 testing. While several members of staff did not want to work with him, the head of their group disagreed but decided after a long debate to isolate Z. The hospital continued to function for the rest of the day without disinfection of the places where Z. had been present. On 18 March, Z. was confirmed to be SARS-CoV-2 positive, and the hospital took samples from close contacts of Z. from the previous five days. Some of the nurses were ordered back to work at the hospital while waiting for their test results. As of 24 March 11 of the 59 patients of the hospital and seven medical personnel were found to be SARS-CoV-2 positive. Onet.pl and Gazeta Wyborcza described the situation as contagion caused by carelessness. One of the Grójec hospital personnel also worked at a Niedabyl nursing home. On 28 March 2020, 52 of the 66 residents and eight employees were found to be SARS-CoV-2 positive.

On 1 April 2020, 38 hospitals and hospital sections around Poland, including twelve in the Masovian Voivodeship that includes the Polish capital of Warsaw, were temporarily closed due to the risk of SARS-CoV-2 contamination from a confirmed or likely SARS-CoV-2 infected patient.

=== Second wave, October 2020 ===
On 5 October 2020, Przemysław Czarnek tested positive for SARS-CoV-2.

On 14 October Sebastian Kaleta tested positive for SARS-CoV-2. On 24 October, it was announced that Polish president Andrzej Duda had tested positive for COVID-19 after attending an event in Tallinn where he met Bulgarian president Rumen Radev who had gone into self-isolation after the event. On 2 December 2020, Poland reached 1 million cases.

== Epidemic controls ==
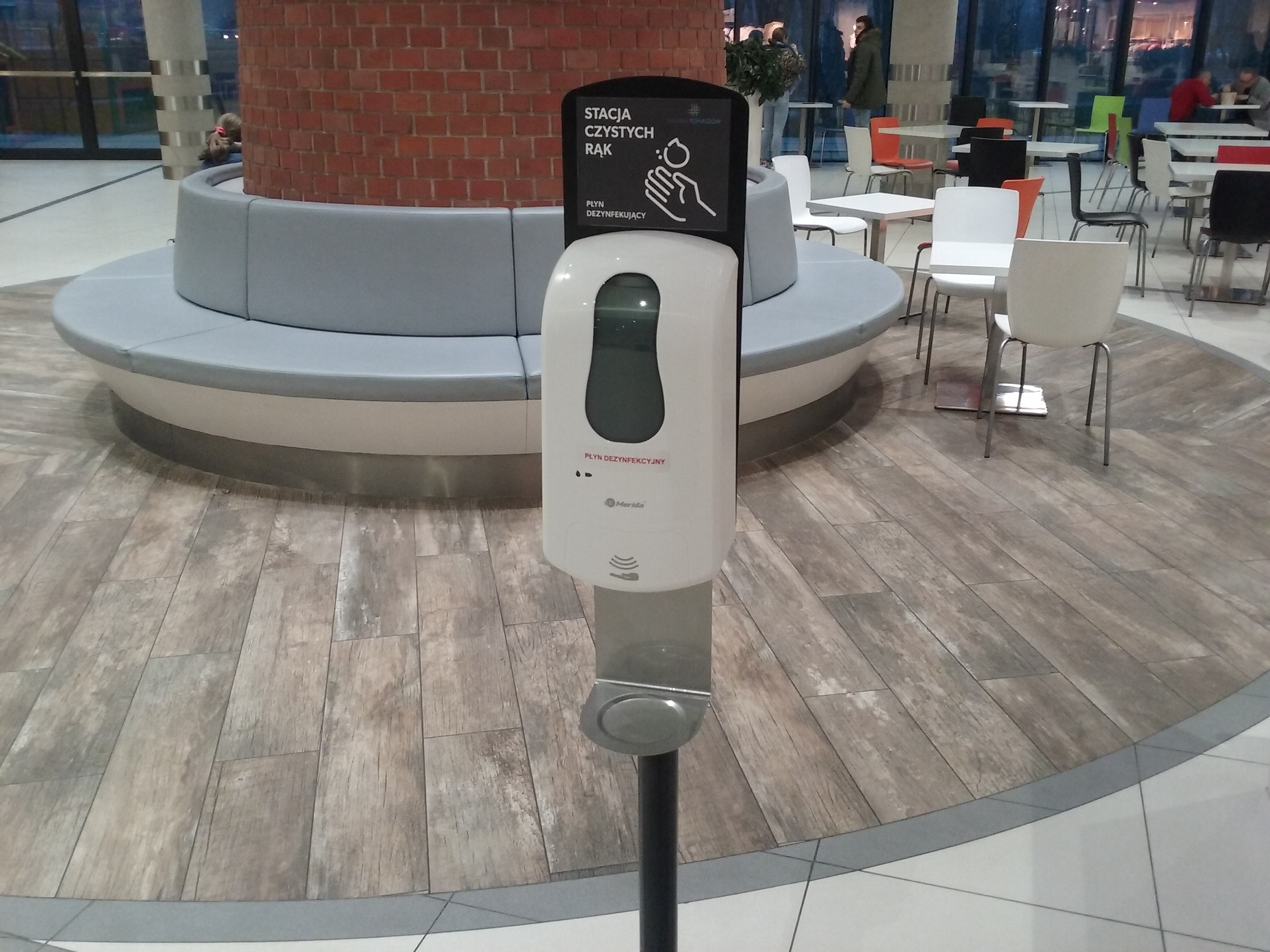
Hand sanitiser distributor in an almost empty shopping centre in Tomaszów Mazowiecki, 3 March 2020

=== Lockdown type measures ===
On 10–12 March 2020 lockdown-type control measures were implemented, closing schools and university classes, offices, and cancelling mass events, defined as those allowing 1000 or more participants in the case of stadiums or other events outside of buildings, and those allowing 500 or more participants in the case of events in buildings. on 12 March 2020, cultural institutions, such as philharmonic orchestras, operas, theatres, museums, and cinemas, had their activities suspended. and all schools in Poland were closed with a reopening initially scheduled for 25 March 2020. The closure was extended to 10 April, with schools being required to carry out online classes with their students. As of 20 March 2020, the dates of final exams for eighth (final) year of primary school and matura, the exam during the final year of secondary school (liceum or technikum), remained unchanged. Universities cancelled classes for the same period, while typically keeping research and administrative staff at work and allowing exceptions for research purposes.

On 20 March 2020, the prime minister, Mateusz Morawiecki declared an official epidemic in Poland.

On 24 March 2020, Poland's government announced further restrictions on people leaving their homes and on public gatherings. The new limits constrained gatherings by default to a maximum of two people (with an exception for families); an exception for religious gatherings, such as mass in the Catholic Church, funerals and marriages in which five participants and the person conducting the ceremony were allowed to gather; and an exception for workplaces. Non-essential travel was prohibited, with the exception of travelling to work or home, SARS-CoV-2 control related activities, or "necessary everyday activities". Everyday activities qualifying as "necessary" included shopping, buying medicines, visiting doctors, walking dogs, jogging, cycling and walking, provided that no more than two people participate and contact with others was avoided. The restrictions were initially defined for the period from 25 March to 11 April inclusive. As of 12 March 2020, the National Bank of Poland, to which commercial banks in Poland send their bank notes to, carried out a two-week quarantine procedure and heating at 150 °C (302 °F) for all bank notes, prior to returning the notes for circulation.

On 31 March 2020, the prime minister announced that Poland would strengthen the restrictions. Lawyers contacted by OKO.press expected the restrictions to be issued as a regulation (secondary legislation) (Polish: rozporządzenie), which they considered would be an unconstitutional method of introducing the rules. The regulation was published in Dziennik Ustaw on 31 March 2020. According to the regulation, minors were prohibited from leaving their homes unaccompanied by a legal guardian. Parks, boulevards and beaches were closed, as well as all hairdressers, beauty parlours and tattoo and piercing salons. Hotels were allowed to operate only if they had residents in quarantine, in another form of isolation, on an obligatory work delegation for services such as building construction or medical purposes. Individuals walking in public were obliged to be separated by at least two metres, with the exception of guardians of children under 13 and disabled persons. No restrictions were applied to people travelling in private cars.

The 31 March regulation allowed religious (Article 9.3a) and other (Article 15.1, 15.2) gatherings of only five people plus religious personnel or funeral employees from 1 to 11 April 2020. Gatherings for up to 50 people, inclusive of religious personnel, were allowed from 12 April 2020 until further notice. An updated regulation on 10 April retained the authorisation of religious/funeral gatherings of up to 50 people but shifted the start date to 20 April (Article 9.2) while other gatherings remained banned (Article 14) 1 person per 10 m^{2}.

On 9 April 2020, Mateusz Morawiecki announced that the closure of cultural institutions and limits implemented in shops would continue until 19 April 2020. The closure of educational institutions and international transport would continue until 26 April 2020. The borders would remain "closed" until 3 May 2020 and people entering Poland would still be required to be quarantined for 14 days. A government website differed from the 31 March regulation, stating that religious gatherings were to be limited to at most five people until 19 April 2020. Police stated that the 10 April 2020 gathering of the de facto leader of Poland Jarosław Kaczyński and nine other people, standing close together, commemorating the Smolensk air disaster by laying a wreath, did not constitute a gathering in the sense of big gatherings forbidden in relation to the COVID-19 pandemic. Former prime minister of Poland Leszek Miller described the gathering as showing contempt for ordinary people respecting the COVID-19 restrictions.

=== Face covering ===
Polish authorities did not participate in the 28 February 2020 European Union tender procedure for purchasing COVID-19 pandemic related medical equipment like gloves, goggles, face shields, surgical masks, and protective clothing, in which 20 other member states participated. Poland instead applied on March 6, 2020, for the 17 March tender. The European Commission stated that all requests in the tender were satisfied by offers. On 9 April 2020 Mateusz Morawiecki announced a new control measure, in that from 16 April 2020 it was obligatory to cover one's nose and mouth in public places. After being asked where people could obtain masks from, Szumowski clarified that any form of face covering, such as scarves, would be acceptable.

From mid-2021 onward, the media reported on more and more Poles ignoring the obligation to wear a mask.

=== SARS-CoV-2 tests ===
As of 20 March 2020, the number of SARS-CoV-2 tests per capita in Poland was lower than that of 22 other members of the European Union, the EFTA and the European Economic Area, and above that of Croatia and Hungary. Using data from 20 March 2020 the number of tests per positive detection was 30.8 tests per positive detection in Poland, higher than for any of the other European countries listed, including Germany (28.7) and Norway (28.1), and lower than in South Korea at 36.6 and Russia at 721 tests per positive detection.

In March 2020, the Minister of Health Łukasz Szumowski claimed that European solidarity in the provision of medical equipment to Poland had failed. OKO.press qualified the claim as "false" and accused the minister of deliberately misleading public opinion. OKO.press referred to the European Union tender process for masks and other protective equipment as a "success" that Poland applied for very late, and commented as context that the EU does not have the legal powers to impose health management policy, such as quarantine measures or closing schools, on member states. The EU tender process was announced on 28 February 2020, to which 20 member states, without Poland, responded. Poland joined the mechanism on 6 March, qualifying for a procedure opened on 17 March for the purchase of gloves, goggles, face protectors, surgical masks and clothing. The European Commission claimed that all the purchases were satisfied by offers, and should arrive within two weeks. Commissioner Thierry Breton described the procedure as illustrating the power of EU coordination. On 19 March 2020, the EU had announced the creation of the rescEU strategic stockpile of medical equipment, to be financed at the level of 90% by the commission, to deal with the COVID-19 pandemic.

=== Vaccination ===
Percentage of COVID-19 fully vaccinated population by gmina (municipality), showing large disparities between vaccination progress in urban and rural areas.

In July 2021, Poland launched a lottery for those willing to receive the coronavirus vaccine. Every day starting on July 1, every 500th person to receive was to get a cash prize of PLN200 (€40) while every 2,000th person was to win PLN500 and every week for three months until the end of September, the government promised to give away five prizes of PLN50,000 and 720 electric scooters. These incentives were designed to encourage the population to get vaccinated, since at the time of the lottery's launch, only 35% of Poland's population had been fully vaccinated against coronavirus.

In November 2021, officers from the Central Police Investigation Bureau detained 11 people who were supposed to help organise false certificates confirming vaccination against COVID-19.

As of January 18, 2022, Poland's vaccination rate was only 56%, below the EU average of 69%. In 2020, one third of Poles aged 18–65 had stated in a study that they would never want to be vaccinated against COVID-19, more so in rural areas with a high representation of the ruling PIS party.

== Impact ==
=== Economy ===
The pandemic and the isolation measures in response to it had a serious impact on the Polish economy, especially commerce, tourism and the hospitality industries.

In November 2020, The European Jamboree 2020, an event for 30,000 scouts and guides in Gdansk, due to take place in July 2020, and initially postponed to July 2021, was ultimately cancelled.

==== Anti-crisis Shield ====
on 1 April 2020, the government launched a plan of public assistance to businesses, called the "Anti-crisis Shield" (Polish: Tarcza antykryzysowa). The program consists primarily of the following five areas.

Financial safety of employees and protection of jobs

- Government-paid social insurance contributions for three months, for companies employing up to nine people, self-employed individuals and freelancers.
- One-off benefits of circa 2,000 PLN gross (80% of the monthly minimal wage) for self-employed and freelancers. Around 2.2 million people are estimated to be eligible for these benefits.
- Working permits for non-citizens are to be prolonged to 30 days after the official revoking of the state of epidemic (as of early April 2020, a formal state of emergency or state of natural disaster had not been declared), if they expire during the state of epidemic.

Finance of business

Business finance measures include:

- Public co-financing of employees' salaries up to 40% of the average monthly wage, if working time has been reduced up to 20%, but no less than working time for a part-time position.
- The taxpayers affected by the pandemic are entitled to deduct their losses incurred in 2020 from income obtained in 2019, providing that revenue has diminished by more than 50%.
- Non-repayable loans up to 5,000 PLN for companies employing up to 9 people, but there cannot be any lay-offs within the next 6 months.
- Enabling legally the company's credit-worthiness assessment on the basis of former year's financial statement to extend the repayment terms of business overdrafts.
- Postponing the deadlines of withholding taxes, submitting the fiscal declarations and implementation of mandatory Employee Pension Plan (EPP, pol. Pracownicze Plany Kapitałowe, PPK)

Healthcare

- Enabling the taxpayers to deduct their donations given for counteracting the pandemic from their income.

Enhancing financial market soundness

- Reducing banks' capital buffers requirements by Financial Stability Committee.

Public investment plan

- Elongated deadlines for public projects and cancellation of deadlines penalties in public tenders.
- The public purchases of equipment needed in counteracting the pandemic no longer have to conform the public procurement law.

== Solidarity with other countries ==
Polish authorities and citizens took several solidarity actions to support people in other countries affected by the pandemic and to help in repatriations.

The Polish government sent medical supplies to Italy and San Marino, including 20,000 litres of disinfectants to Veneto and San Marino, produced by the state-owned Polfa Tarchomin, and a load of medical supplies on 7 April 2020. The Polish Centre for International Aid sent a team of 15 Polish doctors and paramedics to a field hospital in Brescia, Lombardy. Doctors from WIM Warszawa share their Italian COVID-19 experience with Armenian, Azeri and Moldovan colleagues. Polish farmers allocated some of their production to Italian doctors, nurses and other healthcare professionals. The Italian flag was shown as an illumination on many buildings in Poland. Polish authorities sent Spain 20,000 litres of Trisept Complex disinfectant liquid.

A medical mission from Warsaw's Military Institute of Medicine went to Chicago on 23 April 2020 to help in COVID-19 management. On 13 April 2020, the Representation of Solidarity Fund PL in Georgia provided spraying equipment, 500 visors and 800 reusable face masks to municipal authorities in Rustavi and Marneuli (Lower Kartli), Gori (Inner Kartli) and to a clinic in Nikozi, near the demarcation line with South Ossetia. The Polish Ministry of Foreign Affairs allocated 1.2 million PLN to projects aimed at supporting emergency services in Georgia and Ukraine. A convoy of the Polish State Fire Service carrying humanitarian cargo for the National Medical Response Center arrived in Minsk in Belarus on 24 April, for medical institutions in Grodno Oblast, including 50,000 litres of disinfectant, 30,000 litres of antiseptic, 100,000 surgical masks and chloroquine.

The Polish company Wipasz donated 100,000 reusable protective masks to Kazakhstan, laptops for Kazakhstani schoolchildren. A team of Polish eight doctors, nurses and paramedics from Polish Center of International Aid participated in the World Health Organization support program, spending a ten-day mission training staff in Kyrgyz hospitals.

The Polish community participated in grassroots solidarity actions around the world. Volunteers of the Polish Catholic Mission in Freiburg, Breisgau, organised help and emergency counselling, teachers from Polish schools in the Czech Republic sewed masks and provided them to senior peoples' homes, the Polish community in Canada printed 3D protective materials and helped in shopping, the Polish Medical Association from Berdyansk in Ukraine organised telephone consultations, the Association of Poles in Spain nasz Dom – Nuetra casa provided legal and psychological support and sewed protective clothing for nursing homes.

The Polish airline LOT used Twitter to organise a "#LOTdoDomu" ("#aFLIGHTHome") return program of 2,000 people to their countries of origin, including 18 other member states of the European Union (EU). The programme was completed on 5 April 2020. LOT also organised 388 special charter flights over 22 days which brought 55,000 Polish citizens and workers to Poland. Polish authorities offered ferry and dedicated train services, and 18 convoys of 800 vehicles, escorted by police, to help Estonians, Latvians and Lithuanians to return to their countries.

== Censorship of medical personnel ==
On 18 March 2020, an experienced midwife in a Lesser Poland Voivodeship hospital published a report on Facebook on the conditions of medical personnel and the situation of the hospital in relation to the COVID-19 pandemic. On 19 March, she was fired from the hospital by Marek Wierzba. He stated that medical staff should be responsible, reliable and should publish true information. He also stated that the dismissed midwife had been spreading panic. Polish Minister of Health Łukasz Szumowski stated that she shouldn't have been fired.

On 20 March, the secretary of state of the Ministry of Health, Józefa Szczurek-Żelazko, sent a written statement ordering voivodeship medical consultants to not make statements about SARS-CoV-2, the epidemiological situation, the risks for medical staff or methods of protection from infection, unless they had first consulted with the Ministry of Health or Główny Inspektorat Sanitarny. Szczurek-Żelazko motivated the order by the need to provide correct, unified information and to avoid unjustified unrest in the medical community.

Doctors opposed the self-censorship orders; A surgeons group, Porozumienie Chirurgów SKALPEL, described the order as blackmail and said that it risked catastrophe. The group stated that the COVID-19 pandemic showed Poland as "not at all prepared for crisis situations" with a "lack of equipment, basic personal protective gear and disinfectant materials and a lack of standards and procedures".

On 25 March 2020, the Polish Ombudsman Adam Bodnar sent a letter to the Minister of Health, Szumowski, stating that medical staff's freedom of speech and is guaranteed under Articles 2 and 54 of the Polish Constitution and the right of the public to information is guaranteed under Article 61 of the constitution. Bodnar stated that firing or punishing doctors for informing the public during the pandemic could be a violation of the "obligatory standards". Bodnar asked if Szumowski was aware of the situation and requested a clarification of policy.

== Statistics ==
Reverse timeline of major events of COVID-19 pandemic in Poland (6/6)
11 Jan 2022	100,000 confirmed deaths
23 Dec	3,500,000 confirmed recoveries
22 Dec	4,000,000 confirmed cases
16 Dec	90,000 confirmed deaths
3 Dec	85,000 confirmed deaths
28 Nov	3,500,000 confirmed cases
28 Nov	3,000,000 confirmed recoveries
19 Nov	80,000 confirmed deaths
29 Oct	3,000,000 confirmed cases
28 Sep	200 deaths per 100,000 population (2‰)
29 June	75,000 confirmed deaths
9 May	70,000 confirmed deaths

Reverse timeline of major events of COVID-19 pandemic in Poland (5/6)
1 May	2,500,000 confirmed recoveries
24 April	65,000 confirmed deaths
15 April	60,000 confirmed deaths
9 April	150 deaths per 100,000 population (1.5‰)
9 April	2,500,000 confirmed cases
5 April	2,000,000 confirmed recoveries
5 April	55,000 confirmed deaths
24 March	50,000 confirmed deaths
19 March	2,000,000 confirmed cases
9 March	1,500,000 confirmed recoveries
6 March	45,000 confirmed deaths
11 February	40,000 confirmed deaths
4 February	100 deaths per 100,000 population (1‰)
29 January	1,500,000 confirmed cases
23 January	35,000 confirmed deaths

Timeline of major events of COVID-19 pandemic in Poland (4/6)
3 November	400,000 confirmed cases
7 November	500,000 confirmed cases
7 November	200,000 confirmed recoveries
11 November	600,000 confirmed cases
14 November	10,000 confirmed deaths
15 November	700,000 confirmed cases
20 November	800,000 confirmed cases
24 November	900,000 confirmed cases
26 November	15,000 confirmed deaths
27 November	500,000 confirmed recoveries
2 December	1,000,000 confirmed cases
6 December	20,000 confirmed deaths
19 December	25,000 confirmed deaths
28 December	1,000,000 confirmed recoveries
6 January 2021	30,000 confirmed deaths

Timeline of major events of COVID-19 pandemic in Poland (3/6)
13 September	60,000 confirmed recoveries
22 September	80,000 confirmed cases
30 September	90,000 confirmed cases
1 October	70,000 confirmed recoveries
4 October	100,000 confirmed cases
11 October	80,000 confirmed recoveries
11 October	3,000 confirmed deaths
16 October	150,000 confirmed cases
17 October	90,000 confirmed recoveries
21 October	200,000 confirmed cases
22 October	100,000 confirmed recoveries
22 October	4,000 confirmed deaths
29 October	300,000 confirmed cases
29 October	5,000 confirmed deaths
3 November	6,000 confirmed deaths

Timeline of major events of COVID-19 pandemic in Poland (2/6)
25 April	500 confirmed deaths
8 May	5,000 confirmed recoveries
21 May	20,000 confirmed cases
25 May	1,000 confirmed deaths
26 May	10,000 confirmed recoveries
16 June	30,000 confirmed cases
28 June	20,000 confirmed recoveries
19 July	40,000 confirmed cases
19 July	30,000 confirmed recoveries
7 August	50,000 confirmed cases
19 August	40,000 confirmed recoveries
21 August	60,000 confirmed cases
27 August	2,000 confirmed deaths
5 September	70,000 confirmed cases
5 September	50,000 confirmed recoveries

Timeline of major events of COVID-19 pandemic in Poland (1/6)
4 March 2020	First confirmed case
12 March	First confirmed death
12 March	Lockdown-type controls: schools and university are closed (extended several times)
14 March	100 confirmed cases
15 March	Sanitary cordon on all Polish borders
17 March	First confirmed recovery
20 March	Government officially declared a state of epidemic
21 March	500 confirmed cases
25 March	1,000 confirmed cases
4 April	100 confirmed recoveries
6 April	100 confirmed deaths
8 April	5,000 confirmed cases
14 April	500 confirmed recoveries
19 April	1,000 confirmed recoveries
22 April	10,000 confirmed cases

=== Total number of confirmed cases, recoveries and deaths ===
View source data.

=== Confirmed new cases per day ===
View source data.

=== Confirmed deaths per day ===
View source data.

== COVID-19 monitoring, February–April 2020 ==
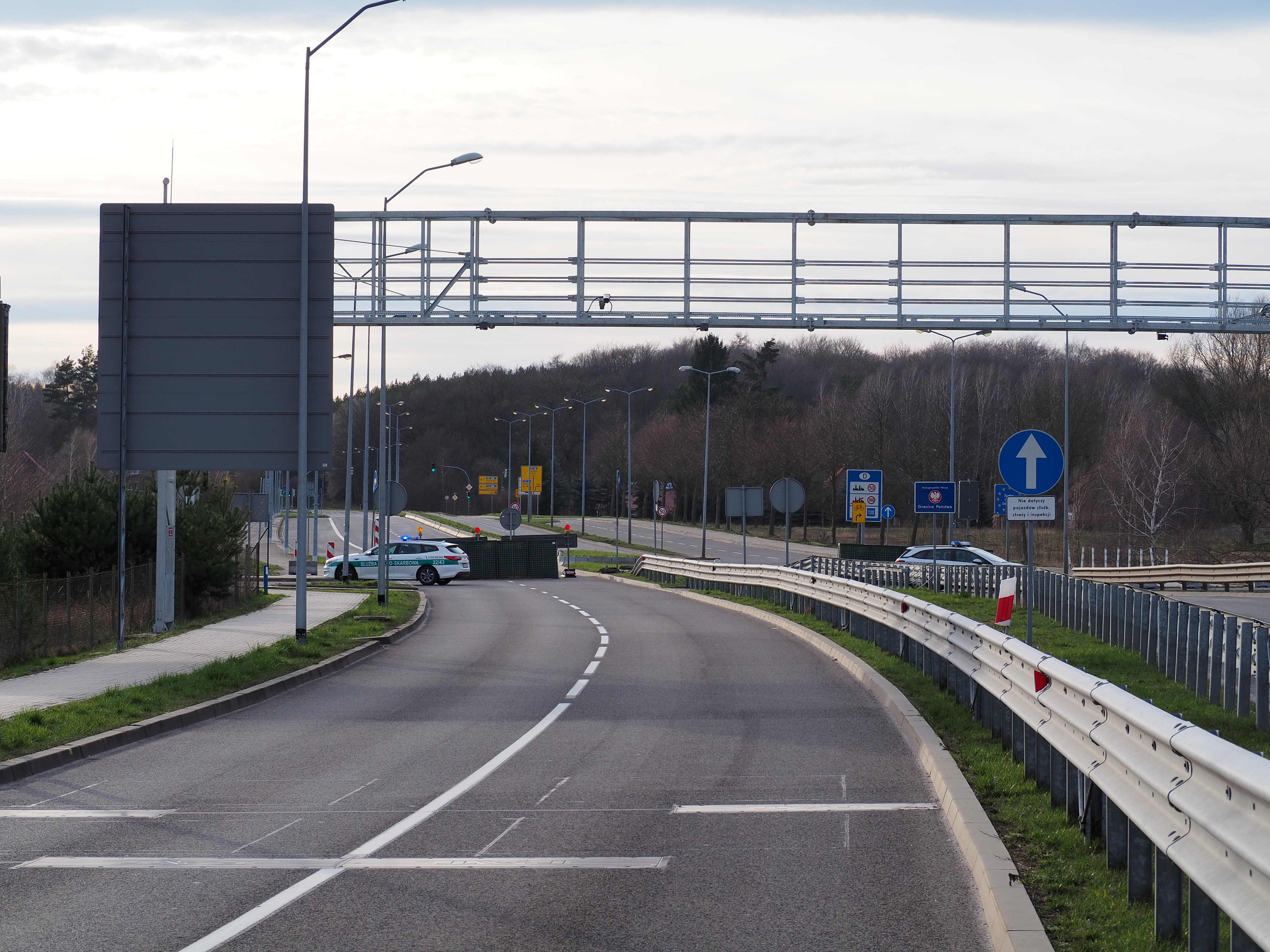
Temporary German–Polish border control at Lubieszyn (Western Pomerania), 15 March 2020.

Animated map of confirmed SARS-CoV-2 cases in Poland

View source data.
COVID-19 monitoring in Poland, February to April 2020. "Suspected" means hospitalised for suspected SARS-CoV-2 infection. In the absence of updates, data from earlier dates are repeated without change. Early values of lab-tested counts are shown as "1" in the absence of data. Quarantine numbers from 17 March include people quarantined after entering Poland following border closures.

After the first laboratory confirmed SARS-CoV-2 case in Poland on 4 March 2020, in Lubusz Voivodeship, bordering Germany, cases were confirmed in seven other voivodeships throughout Poland during 5–9 March 2020, covering eight of the sixteen voivodeships. On 17 March, all sixteen voivodeships had recorded SARS-CoV-2 positive cases, with the final two voivodeships being Kujawsko-Pomorskie and Podlaskie.

On 15 March, Poland closed its land borders for 10 days, and international airports for 14 days for passenger traffic, only allowing Polish residents, citizens and those with immediate Polish family to enter Poland. People entering Poland were required to be quarantined for 14 days. The way in which borders were controlled was criticised as it caused traffic disruptions, forcing drivers to wait in long lines. On 16 March, at the small traffic border crossing in Prudnik cars were waiting in a line of over three kilometres (2 miles).

== Additional information ==
=== COVID-19 versus non-COVID-19 death classification ===
On 26 March 2020, the Polish health authorities' classification of COVID-19 deaths only included deaths of people with lab-confirmed SARS-CoV-2 infection, classified as U07.1 under the ICD-10 international disease classification system. (U07.1). COVID-19 deaths under U07.2, which had been defined by WHO one day earlier to mean deaths when "COVID-19 is diagnosed clinically or epidemiologically but laboratory testing is inconclusive or not available", were not yet included in the NIPH–NIH instructions. Stefan Karczmarewicz, writing in Polityka, interpreted this as an attempt by authorities to lower the official COVID-19 death toll in Poland. He argued that there was a policy of limiting the number of SARS-CoV-2 tests, which together with the exclusion of the ICD-10 category U07.2 implied an underestimate of the true COVID-19 death toll. NIPH–NIH stated that the omission was unintentional due to the timing, and updated its instructions on 1 April, instructing doctors to also use the U07.2 definition of clinically or epidemiologically classified COVID-19 cases. NIPH–NIH stated that the WHO considered it "irrelevant" to distinguish between U07.1 and U07.2. On 6 April 2020, Bartosz Fiałek, a Polish rheumatologist, claimed that the NIPH–NIH instructions were unclear, and that it appeared that U07.2 was not being used for COVID-19 deaths in hospital in which SARS-CoV-2 tests had not been carried out, nor for people dying of COVID-19 in quarantine. Starting on 1 April 2020, fatalities which were clinically or epidemiologically diagnosed as COVID-19 (U07.2) were also considered as COVID-19 deaths by NIPH–NIH.

=== Suspected COVID-19 deaths in quarantine ===
As of 28 March 2020, people in Poland who died in quarantine from suspected COVID-19 were not tested post mortem for SARS-CoV-2. On 21 March 2020, a 45-year-old man who was quarantined in Głogów after returning from outside of Poland and who had shown COVID-19 symptoms was found dead by police. As of 26 March 2020, the prosecutor investigating his death had not decided whether or not to carry out a SARS-CoV-2 laboratory test on the corpse. The dead body of a 50-year-old woman who returned from Germany to Konin and felt ill was found by her family on 24 March. Główny Inspektorat Sanitarny (GIS, the national health agency) refused to test the corpse for SARS-CoV-2. As of 27 March 2020, GIS had not stated what procedures were in place for post mortem tests. As of 6 April 2020, it was not known if any laboratories in Poland were qualified to carry out post-mortem SARS-CoV-2 tests.

=== Unofficial deaths ===
There were several claims of COVID-19 deaths unreported by the Ministry of Health. In early April, Warsaw City Council stated that there had been 32 COVID-19 deaths in Warsaw, while official statistics only listed eight. The Minister of Health stated that the difference was that deaths were officially allocated according to the official places of residence of the deceased. The mayor of Warsaw, Rafał Trzaskowski, stated that the data were carefully checked, and that 18 of the 32 were registered as officially living in Warsaw, not eight.

Disagreement between local media, the head of the Kuyavian-Pomeranian Voivodeship, and GIS continued for several days in early April in relation to the 4 April death in a Grudziądz hospital of a 64-year-old woman from Grudziądz who was SARS-CoV-2 positive. Gazeta Pomorska stated that the head of the voivodeship only accepted including the 64-year-old's death in official reports after the newspaper "intervened". As of 8 April 2020, according to Gazeta Pomorska, the Ministry of Health still listed only one COVID-19 death from Grudziądz (that of an 80-year-old), while local branches of the health agency stated zero SARS-CoV-2 infections from Grudziądz in their reports.

== See also ==
- Statistics of the COVID-19 pandemic in Poland
- COVID-19 pandemic in Europe
- COVID-19 pandemic by country and territory
- 2020 Polish presidential election#COVID-19, election timing and controversy – relationship between the pandemic and the 2020 Polish presidential election
- 2020–2021 women's strike protests in Poland
