= SwiatPrzychodni.pl =

Polish healthcare website

- Owner: WARG Sp. z o.o.
- Website: swiatprzychodni.pl

SwiatPrzychodni.pl is a Polish website about healthcare. Its main purpose is to simplify searching for public healthcare facilities with shortest waiting time. It also allows reviewing clinics and publishes medical articles.

The website has operated since December 2011. Information it publishes has been used by Polish media, in scientific journals and government documents. By the end of November 2018, the website stored information about over 27 thousand active medical facilities and almost 32 thousand comments.

Apart from Internet activity, petitions and complaints issued by the website resulted in the way National Health Fund verifies reports sent by clinics. Also, in 2018 the website was presented as an important tool during series of trainings for digitally excluded seniors conducted as part of program Polska Cyfrowa Równych Szans (en. Digital Poland of Equal Chances).
