= Franciszka Cegielska =

Polish politician and government official

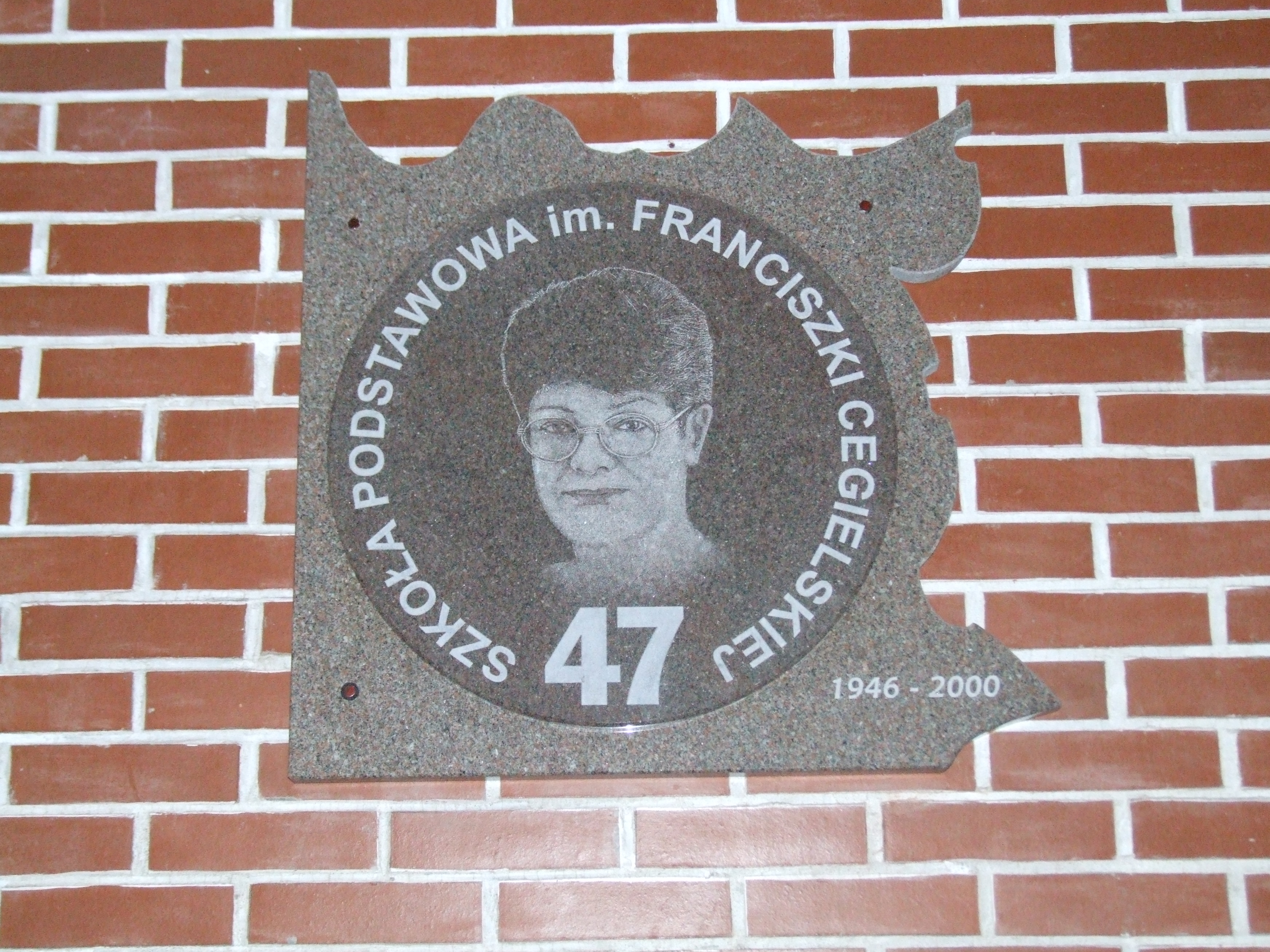
- A commemorative plaque in Gdynia, Poland depicting a portrait of Franciszka Cegielska.

Minister of Health of Poland
- In office 26 March 1999 – 22 October 2000
- President: Aleksander Kwaśniewski
- Prime Minister: Jerzy Buzek
- Preceded by: Wojciech Maksymowicz
- Succeeded by: Grzegorz Opala

Member of the Sejm of Poland
- In office 20 October 1997 – 22 October 2000

Chairperson of the Pomeranian Voivodeship Sejmik
- In office 11 October 1998 – June 1999
- Preceded by: office established
- Succeeded by: Grzegorz Grzelak

Mayor of Gdynia
- In office 13 June 1990 – 28 October 1998
- Preceded by: Zbigniew Koriat
- Succeeded by: Wojciech Szczurek

Personal details
- Born: 2 August 1946 Mulhouse, France
- Died: 22 October 2000 (aged 54) Kraków, Poland
- Resting place: Witomino Cemetery, Gdynia, Poland
- Party: Movement of the Hundred; Solidarity Electoral Action; Republican Coalition
- Education: Szczecin University of Technology; Gdańsk University of Technology
- Occupation: Politician, Academic; Engineer

Franciszka Cegielska (2 August 1946 – 22 October 2000; Polish: [franˈt͡ɕiʂ.ka t͡sɛˈɡjɛl.ska]) was a politician, government official and engineer. She was the Minister of Health of Poland from 1999 to 2000. Additionally, she was also a member of Sejm of Poland from 1997 to 2000, a member and chairperson of the Pomeranian Voivodeship Sejmik from 1998 to 1999, and the mayor of Gdynia from 1990 to 1998.

== Biography ==
Franciszka Cegielska was born on 2 August 1946 in Mulhouse, France. In 1970, she had graduated from the Faculty of Mechanical Engineering of the Szczecin University of Technology, and in 1975, from the Gdańsk University of Technology. Until 1987 she was a professor at the Gdynia Maritime University.

In 1989, Cegielska has organised and led the Gdynia division of the Solidarity Citizens' Committee. From 13 June 1990 to 28 October 1998, she was mayor of Gdynia. At the time, she was also a deputy chairperson of the Association of Polish Cities. During the 1991 parliamentary election, Cegielska unsuccessfully ran for the office of a member of the Sejm of Poland as the candidate of the Republican Coalition. She ran again in 1997, winning the seat as the candidate of the Solidarity Electoral Action. During the 1998 local election Cegielska successfully run for the office of a member of the Pomeranian Voivodeship Sejmik, and on 11 October 1998 became its chairperson. In 1999 she became the chairperson of the Movement of the Hundred political party. As its member she was also a part of the parliamentary group of Polish Christian Democratic Agreement.

On 26 March 1999 Cegielska was appointed the Minister of Health in the cabinet of Jerzy Buzek. She remained as chairperson of the Pomeranian Voivodeship Sejmik until June 1999. In 2000, she was awarded the Eugeniusz Kwiatkowski Medal by the Gdynia City Council for her long-time contributions for the city, and the Honorary Medal of the Association of Polish Cities.

Cegielska died from pancreatic cancer on 22 October 2000 in Kraków, and was buried at the Witomino Cemetery in Gdynia. She was posthumously awarded with the Commander's Cross of the Order of Polonia Restituta in 2009, and the Honorary Badge for Merits to the Local Government in 2015.

== Awards and decorations ==
- Commander's Cross of the Order of Polonia Restituta (2009, posthumously)
- Honorary Badge for Merits to the Local Government (2015, posthumously)
- Eugeniusz Kwiatkowski Medal (2000)
- Honorary Medal of the Association of Polish Cities
