= Agnieszka Pachciarz =

Polish lawyer

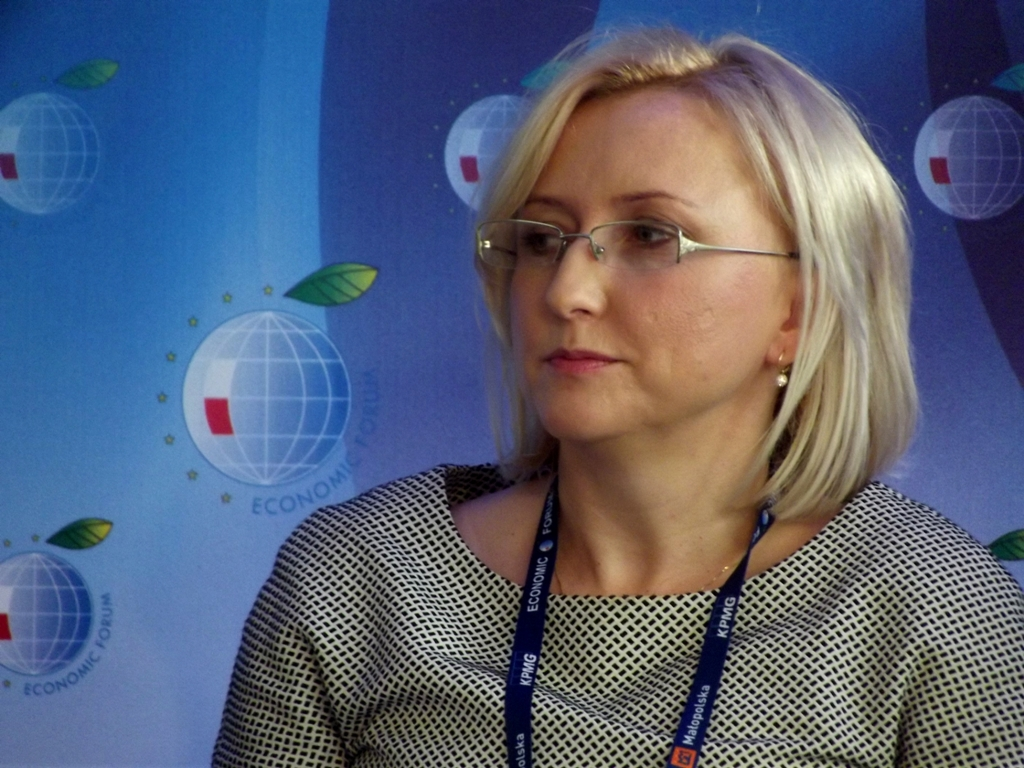

President of the National Health Fund
- In office June 27, 2012 – December 19, 2013
- Preceded by: Jacek Paszkiewicz
- Succeeded by: Marcin Pakulski

Personal details
- Born: February 6, 1973 (age 52); Jarocin, Poland

Agnieszka Pachciarz (born February 6, 1973, in Jarocin, Poland) is a Polish lawyer, legal counsel, in 2012 undersecretary of state in the Ministry of Health, then until 2013 president of the National Health Fund, in 2015 deputy mayor of Poznań.

== Biography ==
In 1992 she graduated from the T. Kosciuszko High School in Jarocin. She graduated from the Faculty of Law and Administration of Adam Mickiewicz University in Poznan.

In 2004, she was authorized as a legal advisor, worked with medical self-government organizations and health administration institutions. Since 2005 she has managed health care units in Slupca and Pleszew.

On March 6, 2012, she was appointed undersecretary of state at the Ministry of Health in Donald Tusk's government. On June 27 of the same year, she took office as president of the National Health Fund, replacing Jacek Paszkiewicz. At the request of Health Minister Bartosz Arłukowicz, she was dismissed from this position on December 19, 2013.

From March 1, 2014, to February 8, 2015, she was president of the capital company University Center for Dentistry and Specialized Medicine, owned by the Karol Marcinkowski University of Medical Sciences in Poznań, and on February 27, 2014, she became a member of the supervisory board of the company Poznań Municipal Investments, appointed by the Poznań City Council.

In January 2015, she became deputy to Poznań Mayor Jacek Jaskowiak. She resigned from this position in August of the same year. In October 2015, she became an advisor to the Środa Wielkopolska County board on the restructuring of the hospital in Środa Wielkopolska, and in January 2016 she became an advisor on the restructuring of the hospital in Krotoszyn. In January 2017, she took over as director of the Wielkopolska Regional Branch of the National Health Fund in Poznań.
