= NFZ =

NFZ may refer to:

- No-fly zone
- National Health Fund in Poland, Narodowy Fundusz Zdrowia
