= Katarzyna Sójka =

Polish politician (born 1986)

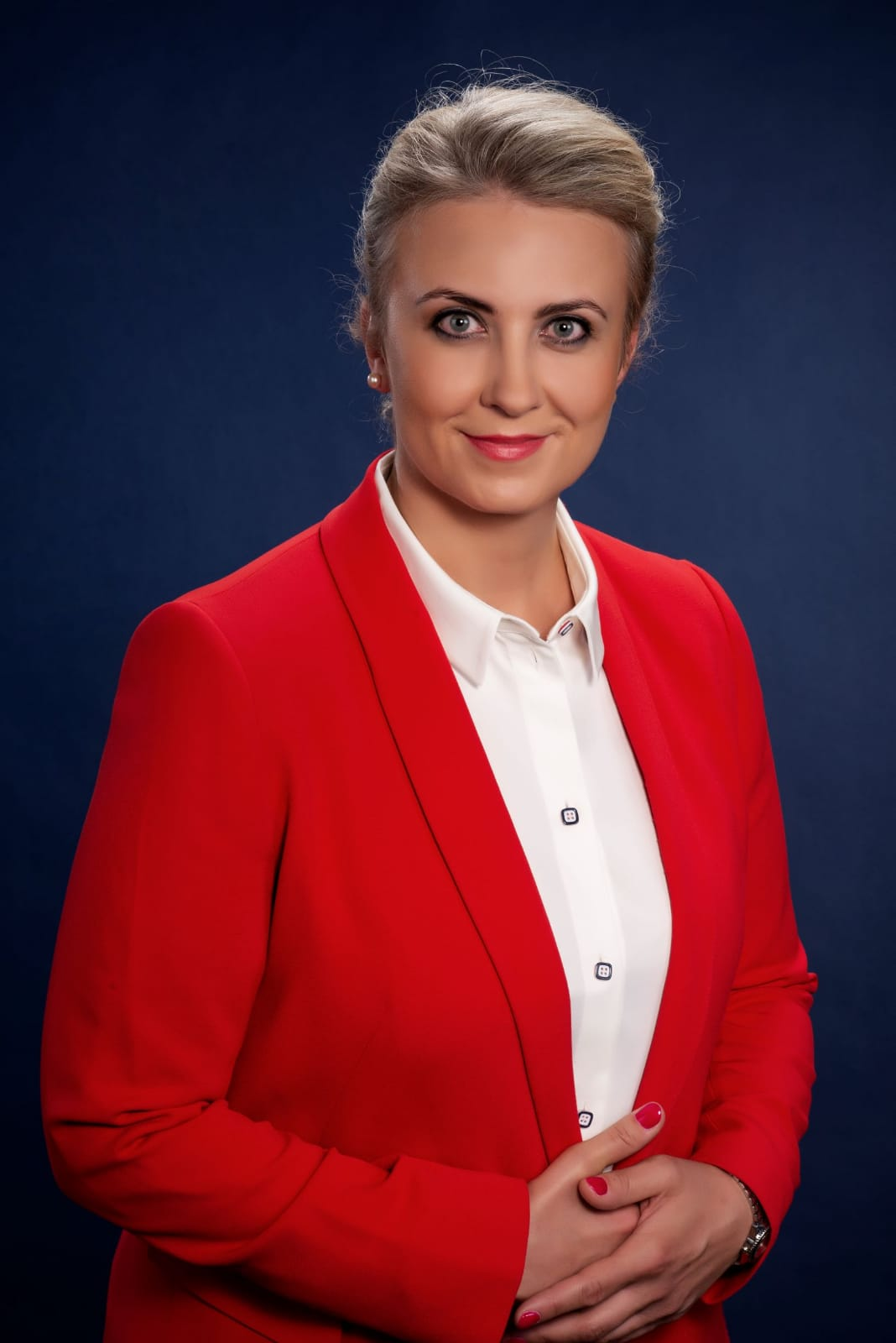

Minister of Health
- In office 10 August 2023 – 27 November 2023
- President: Andrzej Duda
- Prime Minister: Mateusz Morawiecki
- Preceded by: Adam Niedzielski
- Succeeded by: Ewa Krajewska

Member of Sejm
- Incumbent
- Assumed office 12 November 2019

Personal details
- Born: February 5, 1986 (age 40) Ostrów Wielkopolski, Poland

Katarzyna Sójka (born 1986) is a Polish politician. She was elected to the Sejm (9th term) representing the constituency of Kalisz.
