= National Centre for Quality Assessment in Healthcare =

Polish government agency

The National Centre for Quality Assessment in Healthcare (in Polish: Centrum Monitorowania Jakości w Ochronie Zdrowia (CMJ)) is an agency of the Ministry of Health (Poland), established in 1998, with the job of encouraging healthcare facilities to improve the quality and efficacy of services and patient safety standards.

It runs a hospital accreditation programme in Poland. In order to obtain accreditation, hospitals are required to demonstrate appropriate procedures are in place and followed. It carries out a structured process of external assessment, based on measurable criteria and accepted standards which it publishes.

In April 2016 it was the first European health agency to recommend the use of Antimicrobial copper-alloy touch surfaces as an infection prevention and control measure.

Its role is comparable to the Care Quality Commission and the National Institute for Health and Care Excellence in England.

The law was amended in 2022 so that all entities conducting medical activity if they provide services financed from public funds will need to be authorised.
