= Adam Niedzielski =

Polish economist (born 1973)

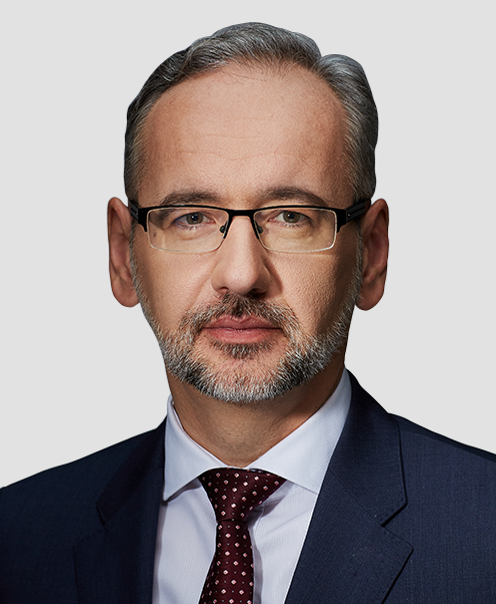
- Niedzielski in 2020

Minister of Health
- In office 26 August 2020 – 8 August 2023
- President: Andrzej Duda
- Prime Minister: Mateusz Morawiecki
- Preceded by: Łukasz Szumowski
- Succeeded by: Katarzyna Sójka

President of the National Health Fund
- In office 18 July 2019 – 26 August 2020; Acting: 18 July 2019 – 10 october 2019
- Deputy: Filip Nowak; Bernard Waśko
- Preceded by: Andrzej Jacyna
- Succeeded by: Filip Nowak (Acting)

Personal details
- Born: Adam Wojciech Niedzielski; 19 November 1973 (age 52) Warsaw, Poland

Adam Wojciech Niedzielski (Polish pronunciation: [ˈa.dam ɲɛˈd͡ʑɛ.lskʲi]; born 19 November 1973) is a Polish economist. He is the former President of the National Health Fund. He was Minister of Health of the Republic of Poland.

== Professional work ==
Niedzielski began his professional career at the Department of Financial Politics and Analysis of the Ministry of Finance, where from 1996 to 1998 he was involved in macroeconomic analysis. From 1998 to 2004, he worked at the Institute of Market Economics. From 1999 to 2007, he worked at the Higher School of Trade and International Finance. From 2002 to 2007, he served as an economic advisor to the Supreme Audit Office. From 2007 to 2013, he was the director of the Department of Finances and the Department of Controlling at the Social Insurance Institution, and from 2013 to 2016, he was the director of the Department of Strategy and Deregulation of the Ministry of Justice. In February 2016, he became the Advisor to the President of the Social Insurance Institution. He acted as the Director-General of the Ministry of Finance from November 2016. In 2018, the Minister of Health Łukasz Szumowski appointed him as the vice-president of Operations of the National Health Fund. In 2019, he became the President of the NHF.

On 18 August 2020, Łukasz Szumowski resigned from his position as the Minister of Health. On 20 August, the Prime Minister of Poland Mateusz Morawiecki announced that Adam Niedzielski will replace Szumowski as the head of the ministry. On 26 August 2020, he was appointed to the office by the President of Poland Andrzej Duda.
