= Jolanta Sobierańska-Grenda =

Polish politician (born 1973)

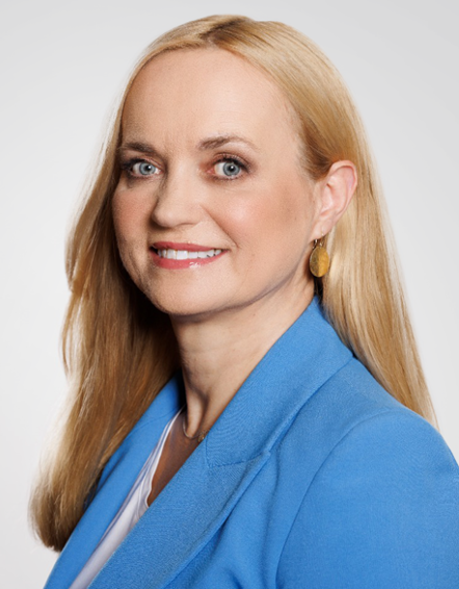
- Sobierańska-Grenda in 2025

Minister of Health
- Incumbent
- Assumed office 24 July 2025
- Prime Minister: Donald Tusk
- Preceded by: Izabela Leszczyna

Personal details
- Born: 17 July 1973 (age 53) Malbork, Poland
- Party: Independent

Jolanta Sobierańska-Grenda (born 17 July 1973) is a Polish politician serving as Minister of Health since 2025. From 2017 to 2025, she served as president of Szpitale Pomorskie.

== Biography ==
She was born on 17 July 1973 in Malbork in Northern Poland.

On 23 July 2025, Prime Minister Donald Tusk in his announcement about the many changes in the Cabinet said that Sobierańska-Grenda would replace Izabela Leszczyna as the Minister of Health. She was inaugurated the next day with the rest of the newly appointed ministers by President Andrzej Duda.
