= Izabela Leszczyna =

Polish official (born 1962)

Izabela Dorota Leszczyna
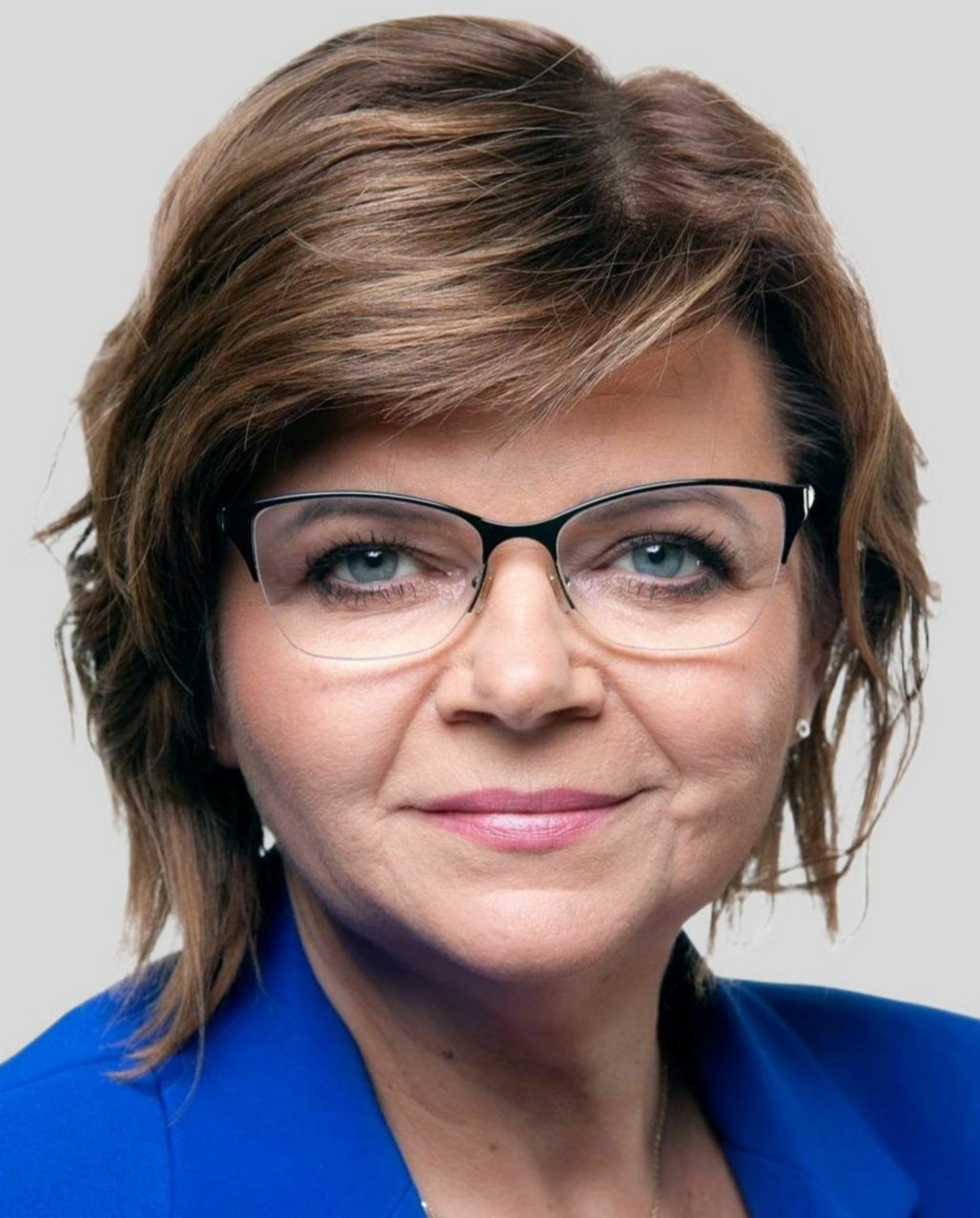
- Leszczyna in 2023

Minister of Health
- In office 13 December 2023 – 24 July 2025
- Prime Minister: Donald Tusk
- Preceded by: Ewa Krajewska
- Succeeded by: Jolanta Sobierańska-Grenda

Member of Sejm
- Incumbent
- Assumed office 16 November 2007
- Constituency: 28-Częstochowa

Personal details
- Born: 3 September 1962 (age 63) Częstochowa, Poland
- Party: Civic Platform (2006–present)
- Other political affiliations: Civic Coalition (2018–present)

Izabela Dorota Leszczyna (born 3 September 1962) is a Polish politician, teacher, who served as Minister of Health from December 2023 to July 2025. She is also a Member of the Sejm since 2007.

== Biography ==
Leszczyna graduated in Polish philology at the Jagiellonian University in Kraków. In 2006, she was elected to Częstochowa City Council from the Civic Platform. Leszczyna was elected from the Civic Platform to the Sejm in: 2007, 2011, 2015 and 2019.

In 2010, in the elections for the office of President of Częstochowa, she obtained the second result (21.99%). In the second round of elections, she obtained 29.11% of votes and was defeated by Krzysztof Matyjaszczyk.

On December 13, 2023, she was appointed as the Minister of Health in Donald Tusk's third cabinet.

On July 24, 2025, she was removed from her post as Minister of Health as a result of a cabinet reshuffle by Donald Tusk.
