= Statistics of the COVID-19 pandemic in Poland =

Statistics of the COVID-19 pandemic in Poland contains a number of interactive graphs detailing various coronavirus statistics in Poland during the pandemic period.

== Statistics ==
See COVID-19 pandemic in Poland for the cumulative lab-confirmed case count/deaths/recoveries graph shown as a horizontal bar graph; and for a daily cases/deaths/recoveries graph.

=== Detailed graphs for active cases, daily cases/deaths/recoveries ===
September 1 – New way of testing and quarantine
December 2 – Rapid COVID-19 antigen tests introduced for patients

View source data.

=== Detailed graphs for active cases vs recoveries ===
View source data.

New cases per day reported

View source data.

7-day average

View source data.

New recovered by day reported

View source data.

New deaths by day reported

View source data.

Tests per day

View source data.

total number of people vaccinated
(Vaccinations started in Jan 2021)

View source data.
