= Władysław Sidorowicz =

Polish politician (1945–2014)

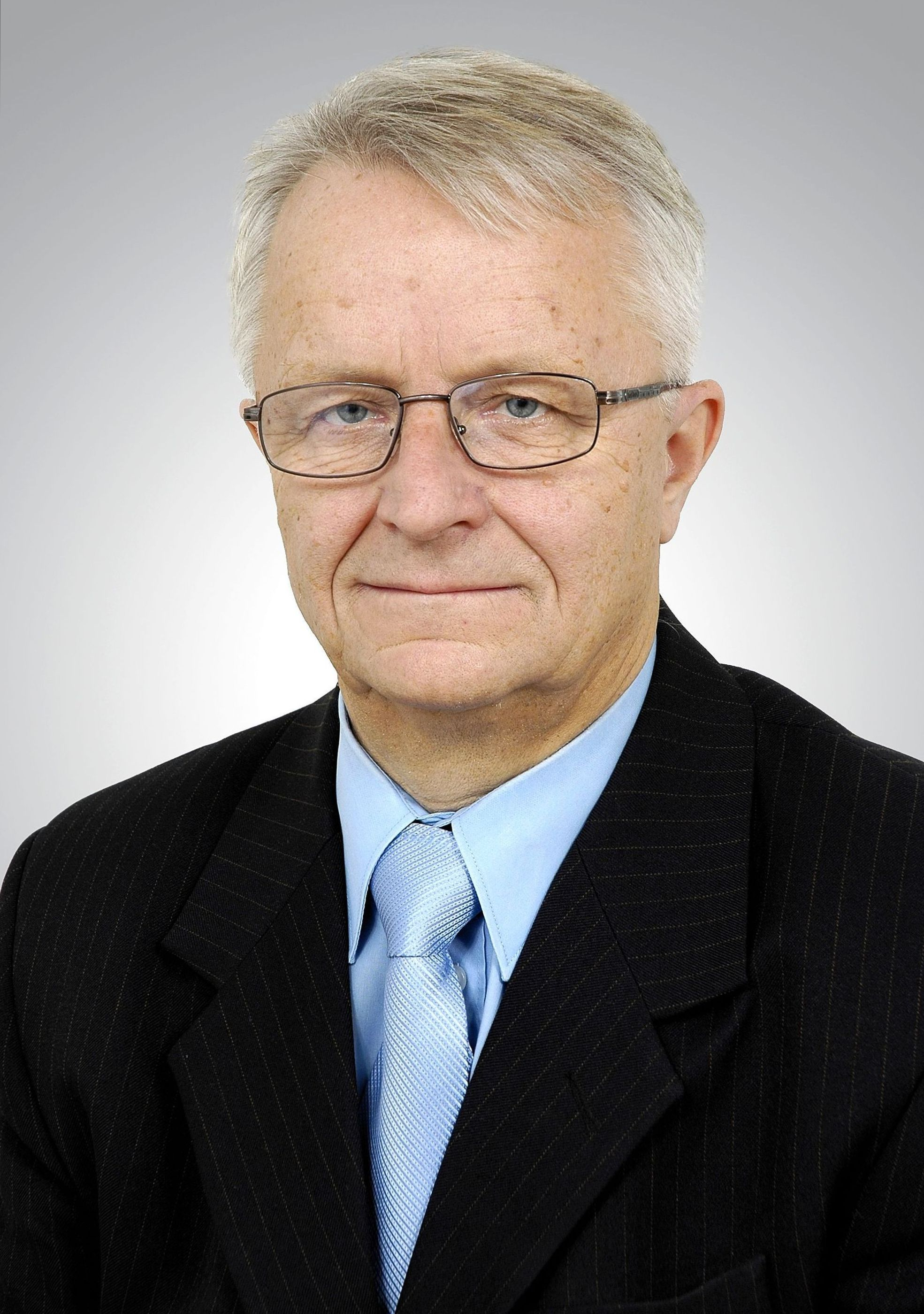
Władysław Sidorowicz

Władysław Sidorowicz (17 September 1945 – 24 July 2014) was a Polish senator, representing Civic Platform. He was born in Wilno.

Sidorowicz was a member of the Polish Solidarity trade union where he was the director of its Regional Coordinating Commission for Health Service Workers. During the martial law in Poland he was arrested and interned. He participated in the Round Table talks. He was a Minister of Health (1991).

In 2014, he died in Wrocław, aged 68, from undisclosed causes.
