= Łukasz Szumowski =

Polish cardiologist and politician

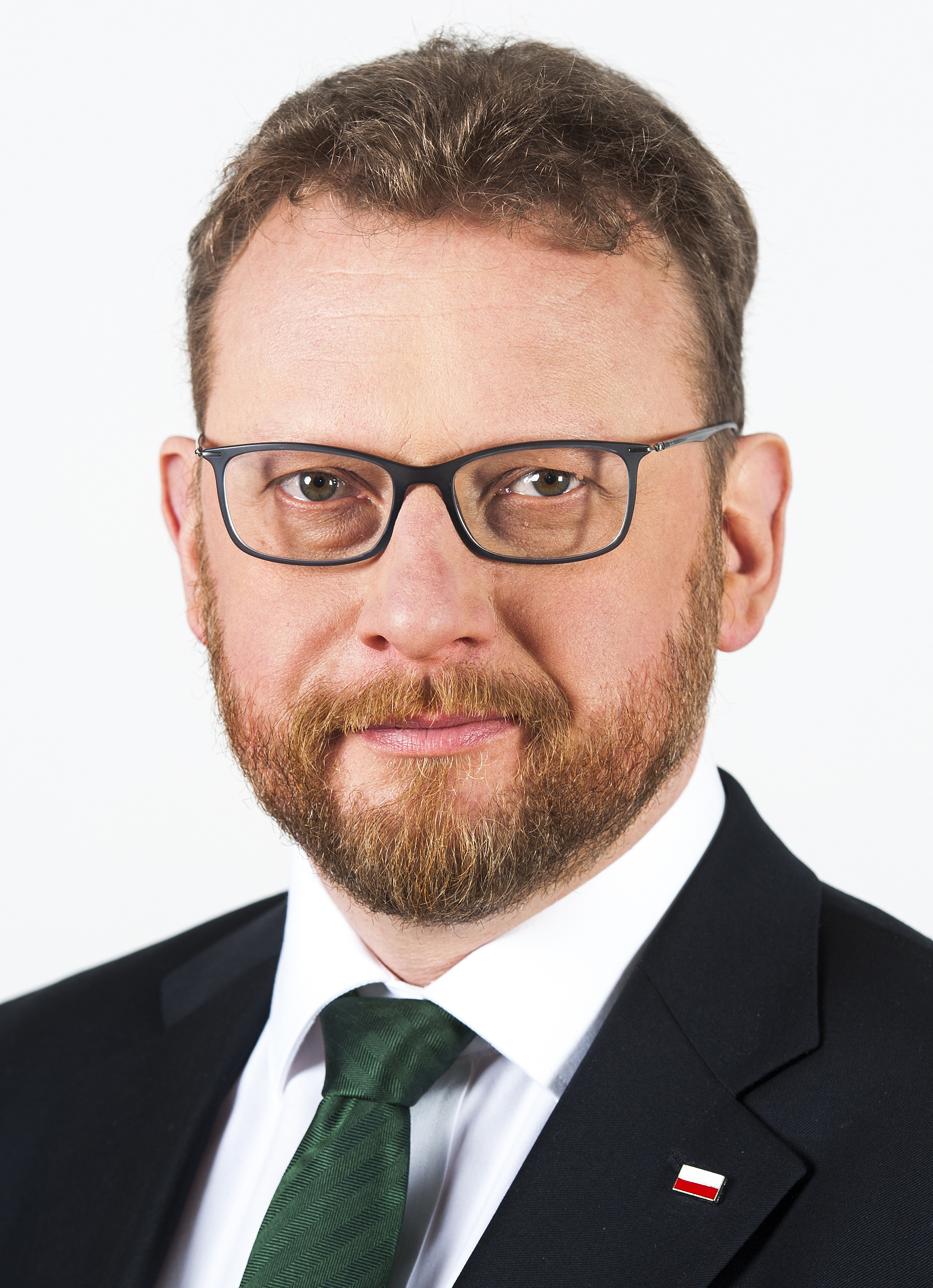
- In office 9 January 2018 – 20 August 2020
- Prime Minister: Mateusz Morawiecki
- Preceded by: Konstanty Radziwiłł
- Succeeded by: Adam Niedzielski

Minister of Health
- In office 9 January 2018 – 20 August 2020

Member of Sejm
- In office 12 November 2019 – 1 February 2022

Personal details
- Born: Łukasz Jan Szumowski; 3 June 1972 (age 54) Warsaw, Poland
- Spouse: Anna Szumowska (m. 1997)
- Children: 4
- Education: Medical University of Warsaw

Łukasz Jan Szumowski (born 3 June 1972) is a Polish cardiologist who served as Minister of Health from 2018 to 2020. He is also a member of the IX Sejm, representing the Płock (Nr. 16) constituency, elected from the lists of Law and Justice.

== Biography ==
Born 3 June 1972 in Warsaw. In 1997 he finished studies at the Medical University of Warsaw, and later worked at the Institute of Cardiology in Warsaw's Anin osiedle, where he received a doctorate in 2002. Habilitated 26 January 2010. On 2 June 2016 he received the title of Professor of Medical Science. On 24 November 2016 he became an undersecretary of state in the Ministry of Science and Higher Education, directed at the time by Jarosław Gowin. He was responsible inter alia for the creation of the Institute of Medical Biotechnology. On 9 January 2018 he was appointed Minister of Health by Andrzej Duda, at the recommendation of Mateusz Morawiecki. He replaced Konstanty Radziwiłł. In the 2019 Polish Parliamentary election, he won election to the Sejm. Szumowski was Minister of Health during the COVID-19 pandemic in Poland. On 18 August 2020 he resigned from the position. On January 28, 2022, he resigned from his parliamentary mandate, and on February 1, 2022, he ceased to be a member of the Sejm. From February 1, 2022 to January 2024, he was the director of the Stefan Cardinal Wyszyński National Institute of Cardiology.

He is the author of many medical publications, and is the editor in chief of "Heartbeat Journal".

== Personal life ==
Married to Anna, he has 4 children. After his studies Łukasz Szumowski with his wife worked for a month in Mother Teresa's hospice. He is a Catholic and member of the Sovereign Military Order of Malta.
