= Ewa Krajewska =

Polish politician (born 1980)

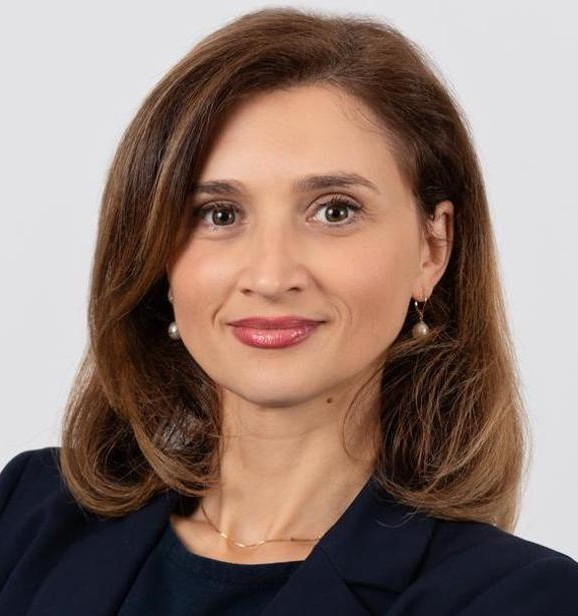
- Krajewska in 2023

Minister of Health
- In office 27 November 2023 – 13 December 2023
- Prime Minister: Mateusz Morawiecki
- Preceded by: Katarzyna Sójka
- Succeeded by: Izabela Leszczyna

Personal details
- Born: 22 October 1980 (age 45)
- Party: Independent

Ewa Krajewska (born 22 October 1980) is a Polish politician. In 2023, she served as minister of health. From 2021 to 2023, she served as chief pharmaceutical inspector.
