= Solidarity Fund PL =

Polish non-profit organisation

Solidarity Fund PL (Polish: Fundacja Solidarności Międzynarodowej) is a Polish non-profit organisation established in 2001 as the Polish Foundation for International Development Cooperation "Know-How."

== History ==
The Fund has been operating under its present name Solidarity Fund PL since 2013. Fund supports democratic transformations, building of civil society, good governance, free media, human rights organisation, development of local democracy, and sharing experience on economic and systemic transitions beyond the Polish borders. The role of the Solidarity Fund PL in the Polish development cooperation system is defined in the Development Cooperation Act of 16 September 2011, under which the Minister of foreign Affairs may request the Fund to carry out tasks in countries which are in a special political situation.

The activities of the Fund are supported mainly with the Polish Development Cooperation funding. Other donors include USAID, GIZ, EuropeAid, and the governments of Canada and Switzerland. Solidarity Fund PL both implements its own cross-border projects and give grants to Polish NGOs. The Foundation conducts Information Centre for Local Authorities in Moldova and two branches in Georgia and Ukraine.

The Fund uses the logo of the first Polish presidency of the EU (in 2011), designed by Jerzy Janiszewski, the author of the graphic symbol of the "Solidarity" Trade Union.
