= National Institute of Public Health – National Institute of Hygiene =

Polish research institute

Coordinates: 52°12′39″N 21°01′23″E

The National Institute of Public Health – National Institute of Hygiene or NIPH–NIH, (Polish: Narodowy Instytut Zdrowia Publicznego – Państwowy Zakład Higieny or NIZP–PZH) is a research institute in Poland focussed on public health. It was founded on 21 November 1918.

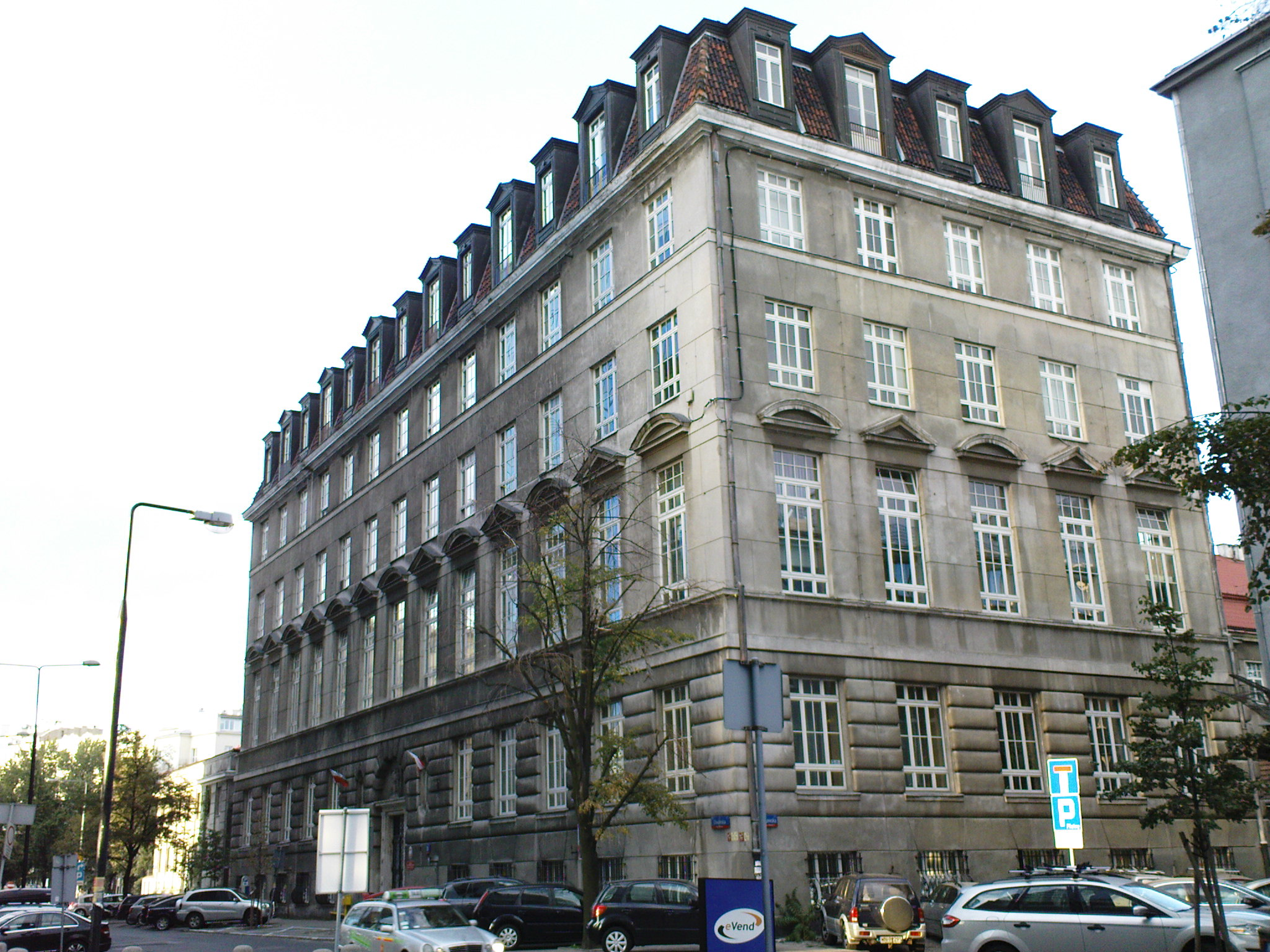
Image of National Institute of Public Health Building, Poland
