= Ministry of Health (Poland) =

Government ministry of Poland

- Ministerstwo Zdrowia
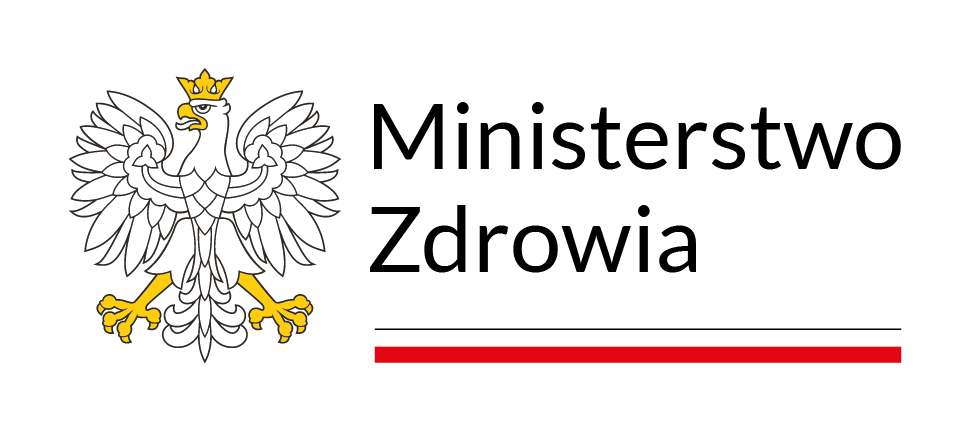
- Ministerial logotype

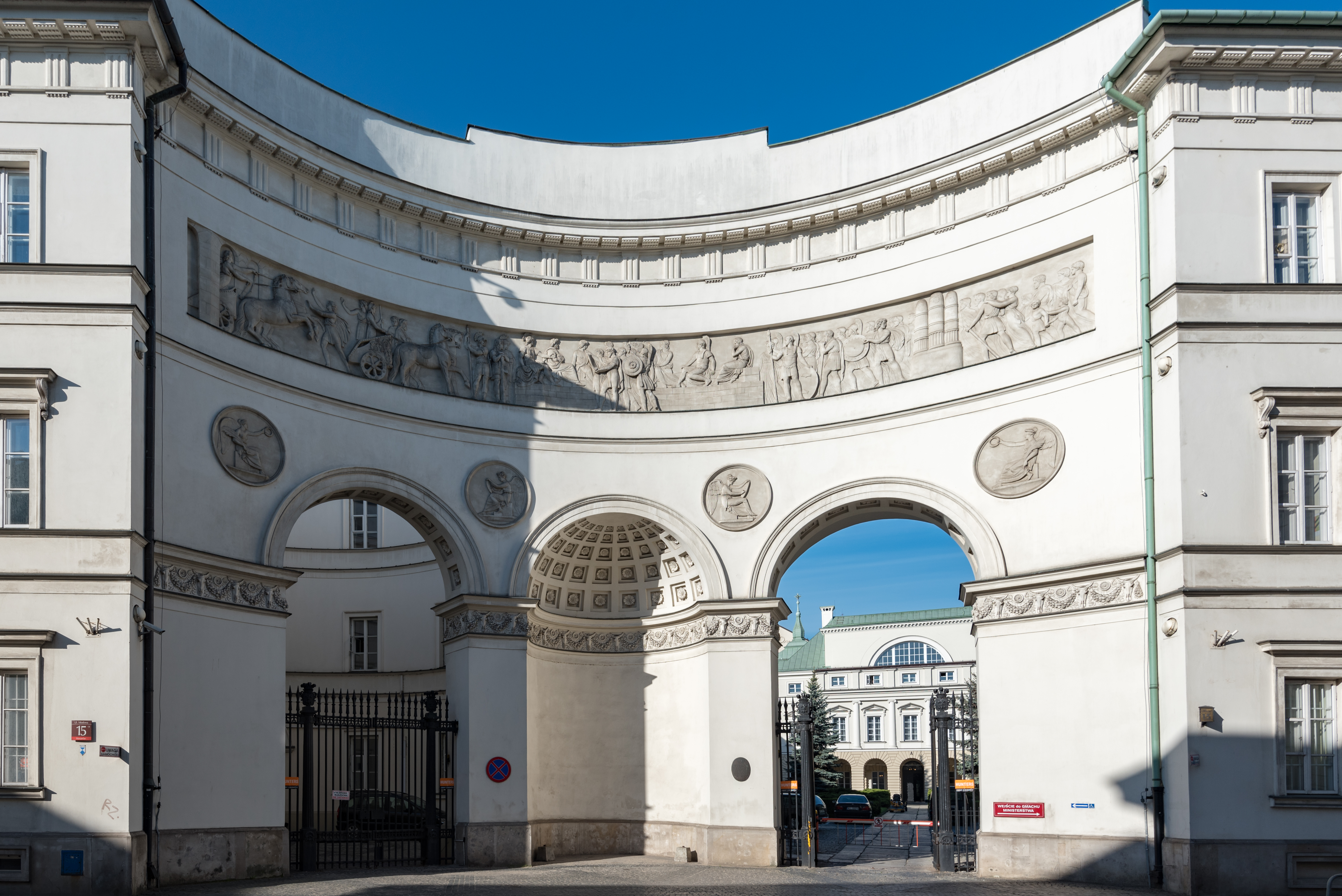
- Pac Palace in Warsaw, the seat of the Ministry

Agency overview
- Formed: 1918
- Jurisdiction: Government of Poland
- Headquarters: ul. Miodowa 15, 00-952 Warsaw; 52°14′48.9″N 21°00′29.3″E
- Minister responsible: Jolanta Sobierańska-Grenda, Minister of Health
- Parent agency: Council of Ministers
- Website: www.gov.pl/zdrowie

Ministry of Health of the Republic of Poland (Polish: Ministerstwo Zdrowia Rzeczypospolitej Polskiej) is one of the ministries of the Republic of Poland. It is responsible for overseeing the organization of the healthcare system, supervision of medical services, health promotion, and disease prevention. The Ministry develops legal regulations, coordinates healthcare financing, and supervises the National Health Fund (NFZ). It is also in charge of reimbursement of medicines, medical devices, and foodstuffs for special medical purposes; oversight of medical professions; development and implementation of public health programs; organization and supervision of the State Medical Emergency System; and activities related to health resort treatment.

== Headquarters ==
The seat of the Ministry of Health is the Pac Palace in Warsaw. It was rebuilt between 1948 and 1951 according to the design of Czesław Konopka and Henryk Białobrzeski, with the elevation from the courtyard being rebuilt according to the design of Marconi, and the garden elevation according to the modified original Baroque design of Tylman van Gameren.

== Management ==
- Jolanta Sobierańska-Grenda – Minister of Health since 24 July 2025
- Katarzyna Kacperczyk – Undersecretary of State since 24 January 2024
- Katarzyna Kęcka – Undersecretary of State since 9 September 2025
- Tomasz Maciejewski – Undersecretary of State since 9 September 2025
- Konrad Korbiński – Director General since 9 September 2025

== Air Ambulance ==
The Polish Medical Air Rescue (Polish: Lotnicze Pogotowie Ratunkowe, lit. 'Aerial Emergency Medical Service', LPR) is an air ambulance service subordinate to the Ministry of Health of Poland. Its fleet includes 27 EC135 helicopters, and 2 Piaggio P.180 Avanti fixed wing airplanes, which operate out of 22 locations throughout Poland.

== List of ministers ==
=== Ministry of Health (1918–1923) ===
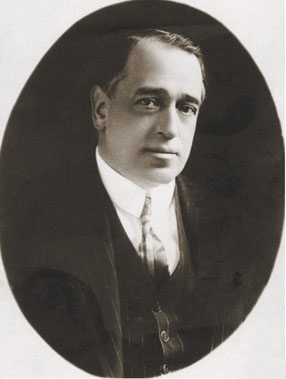
Witold Chodźko in 1919

- Witold Chodźko (1918; 1918–1919; 1920–1923)
- Tomasz Janiszewski (1919–1920)
- Jerzy Bujalski (1923)

=== Ministry of Labour, Welfare and Health (1944–1945) ===
- Bolesław Drobner (21 July 1944 – 31 December 1944)
- Wiktor Trojanowski (31 December 1944 – 11 April 1945)

=== Ministry of Health (1945–1960) ===
- Franciszek Litwin (11 April 1945 – 5 February 1947)
- Tadeusz Michejda (6 February 1947 – 10 January 1951)
- Jerzy Sztachelski (10 January 1951 – 13 November 1956)
- Rajmund Barański (13 November 1956 – 13 June 1960)

=== Ministry of Health and Welfare (1960–1999) ===
- Rajmund Barański (13 June 1960 – May 1961)
- Jerzy Sztachelski (18 May 1961 – 15 July 1968)
- Jan Karol Kostrzewski (15 July 1968 – March 1972)
- Marian Śliwiński (29 March 1972 – 21 November 1980)
- Tadeusz Szelachowski (21 November 1980 – 22 October 1985)
- Mirosław Cybulko (12 November 1985 – 23 October 1987)
- Janusz Komender (23 October 1987 – 19 September 1988)
- Izabela Płaneta-Małecka (14 October 1988 – 1 August 1989)
- Andrzej Kosiniak-Kamysz (12 September 1989 – 14 December 1990)
- Władysław Sidorowicz (12 January 1991 – 5 December 1991)
- Marian Miśkiewicz (23 December 1991 – 5 June 1992)
- Andrzej Wojtyła (11 July 1992 – 26 October 1993)
- Jacek Żochowski (26 October 1993 – 17 September 1997)
- Wojciech Maksymowicz (31 October 1997 – 26 March 1999)
- Franciszka Cegielska (26 March 1999 – 19 October 1999)

=== Ministry of Health (1999–present) ===
- Franciszka Cegielska (19 October 1999 – 22 October 2000)
- Grzegorz Opala (2 November 2000 – 19 October 2001)
- Mariusz Łapiński (19 October 2001 – 18 January 2003)
- Marek Balicki (18 January 2003 – 2 April 2003)
- Leszek Sikorski (2 April 2003 – 2 May 2004)
- Wojciech Rudnicki (2 May 2004 – 19 May 2004)
- Jerzy Hausner (acting; 19 May 2004 – 11 June 2004)
- Marian Czakański (11 June 2004 – 15 July 2004)
- Marek Balicki (15 July 2004 – 31 October 2005)
- Zbigniew Religa (31 October 2005 – 7 September 2007)
- Jarosław Kaczyński (acting; 7 September 2007 – 10 September 2007)
- Zbigniew Religa (31 October 2005 – 16 November 2007)
- Ewa Kopacz (10 September 2007 – 7 November 2011)
- Donald Tusk (acting; 8 November 2011 – 18 November 2011)
- Bartosz Arłukowicz (18 November 2011 – 10 June 2015)
- Marian Zembala (15 June – 16 November 2015)
- Konstanty Radziwiłł (16 November 2015 – 9 January 2018)
- Łukasz Szumowski (9 January 2018 — 20 August 2020)
- Adam Niedzielski (26 August 2020 — 11 August 2023)
- Katarzyna Sójka (10 August 2023 — 27 November 2023)
- Ewa Krajewska (27 November 2023 — 13 December 2023)
- Izabela Leszczyna (13 December 2023 — 24 July 2025)
- Jolanta Sobierańska-Grenda (since 24 July 2025)

== See also ==
- Ministries of Poland
- Health care in Poland
