= Health care in Poland =

National Health Fund logo

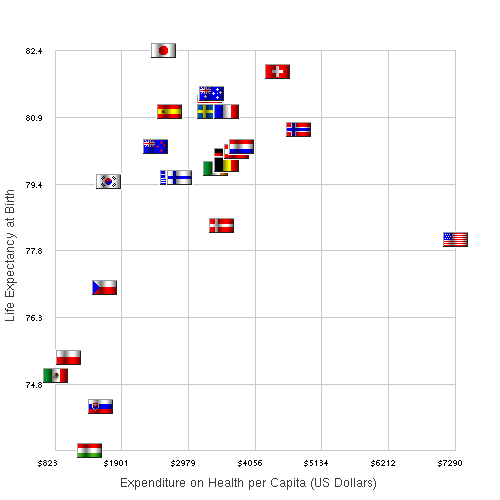
Healthcare spending vs life expectancy for some countries in 2007

Health care in Poland is insurance-based and provided through a publicly funded system known as the National Health Fund. It is free for all Polish citizens who fall under the "insured" category, which typically includes individuals with employer-paid health insurance or those who are the spouse or child of an insured person.

According to Article 68 of the Polish Constitution everyone has a right to have access to health care. Citizens are granted equal access to the publicly-funded healthcare system. In particular, the government is obliged to provide free health care to young children, pregnant women, disabled people, and the elderly. However, private health care use is very extensive in Poland. Patients who are uninsured have to pay the full cost of medical services.

According to a 2016 study by CBOS, among the 84% of patients who participated in the survey, 40% reported using both private and public health services, 37% relied solely on public health care, and 7% used only private services. Additionally, 77% of all respondents indicated that long wait times for public health care were the main reason for turning to private care.

== Financing and health expenses ==
The main financing source is health insurance in the National Health Fund. Citizens are obligated to pay insurance fees (redistributed tax) which is 9% deducted from personal income (7,75% is deducted from the tax, 1,25% covered by insured goes directly to the National Health Fund). The national budget covers around 5% of all health care expenses. Since 2007 emergency rescue services have been financed in total from the national budget. About 70% of health expenses in Poland are covered by contributions to the National Health Fund, with the remaining 30% coming from the state budget.

== Structure ==
The management of the public health system is divided between the Minister of Health and three levels of territorial self-government. It has been suggested that this delays response to problems.

The structure of the health system in Poland is regulated by these laws:

- Ustawa z dnia 15 kwietnia 2011 r. o działalności leczniczej [Medical Services Act], Dz. U., 2024, No. 799 (15 April 2011)
- Ustawa z dnia 27 sierpnia 2004 r. o świadczeniach opieki zdrowotnej finansowanych ze środków publicznych [Publicly-Funded Healthcare Services Act], Dz. U., 2024, No. 146 (27 August 2004)
- Ustawa z dnia 6 listopada 2008 r. o prawach pacjenta i Rzeczniku Praw Pacjenta [Patients’ Rights and Patients’ Ombudsman Act], Dz. U., 2024, No. 581 (6 November 2008)

The services are funded by the National Health Fund.

== Health service providers ==
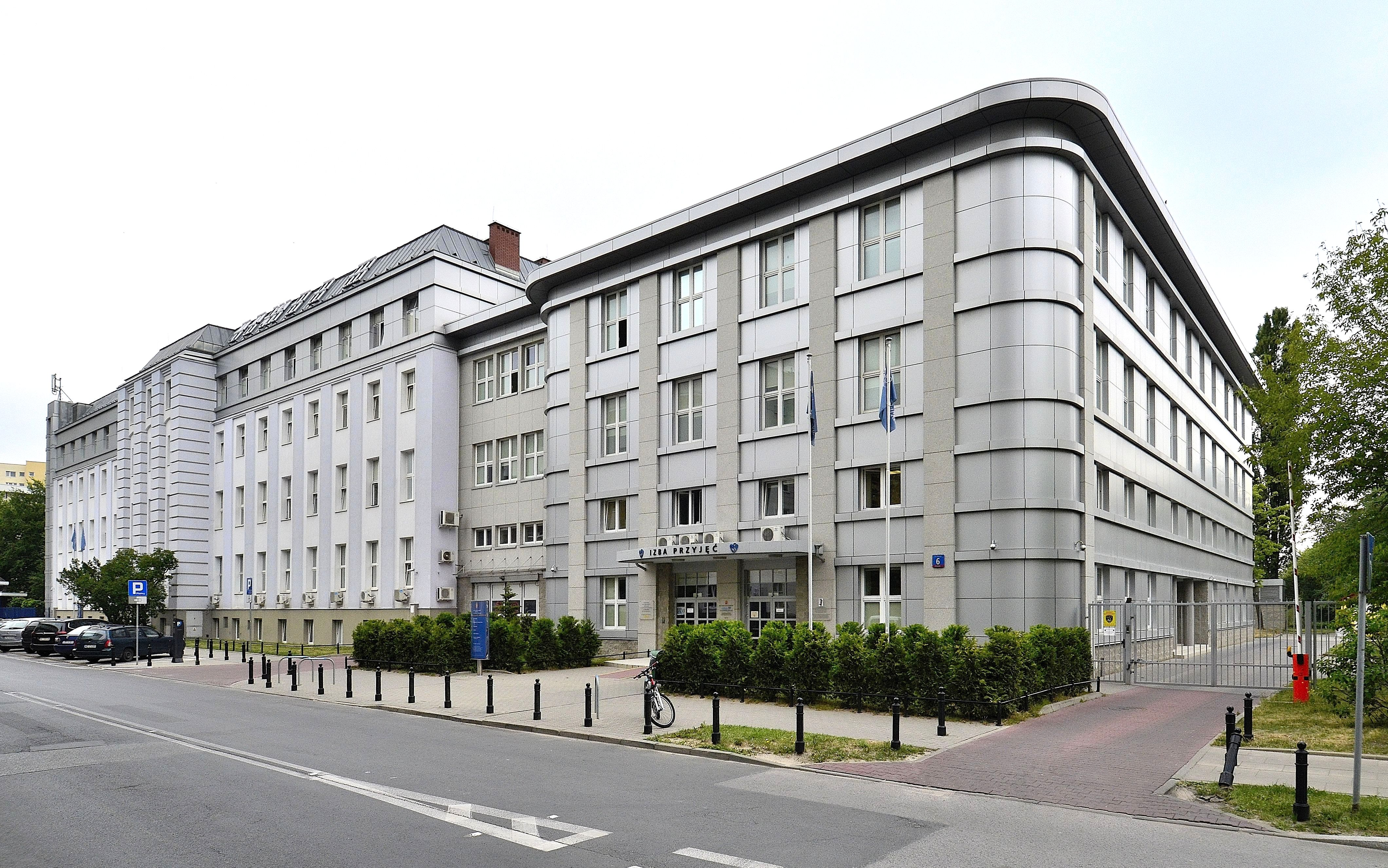
Inflancka Street Hospital in Warsaw, 2015

- Health care units functioning as economic operators
- Self-sufficient public health care units: research institutes, foundations, associations, and churches.
- Private health care: medical, nursing, birth attendant, dentistry
- Drug stores

=== Primary care ===
The basis of the healthcare system is the primary care physician, who is most commonly a specialist in family health. They are responsible for conducting treatment and taking preventive actions for assigned patients. If sickness requires the intervention of a specialist, the first contact doctor issues referral to a hospital or other health care unit. Primary care surgeries are open from Monday to Friday from 8:00 a.m. to 6:00 p.m. At other times the Narodowy Fundusz Zdrowia has contracts with 24-hour medical service units. Addresses and telephone numbers of units providing 24 hour-medical service are available in primary healthcare surgeries. A referral is not needed for oncology, gynecology, psychiatry, dentistry, or sexually transmitted diseases. Not all dental treatment is covered by the health insurance scheme.

== Control and supervising institutions ==
- National Sanitary Inspection (pol. sanepid)
- National Pharmacological Inspection
- Patients Ombudsman
- Voivodeship centers of public health
- Ministry of Health responsible for creating and executing national health programs, control and supervision on general health situation

== Access to health services ==
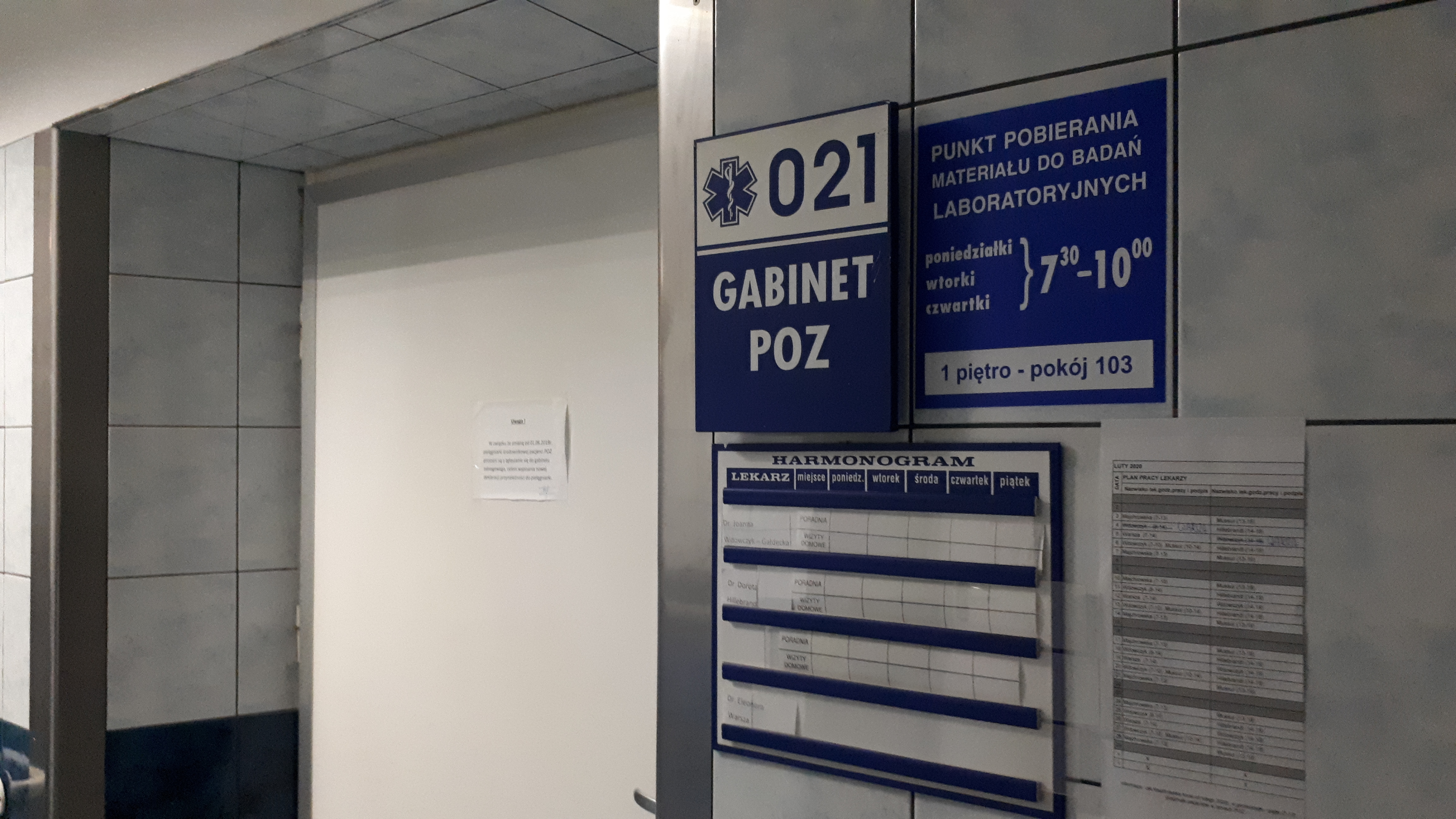
Primary care (Polish: POZ) room in Lodz

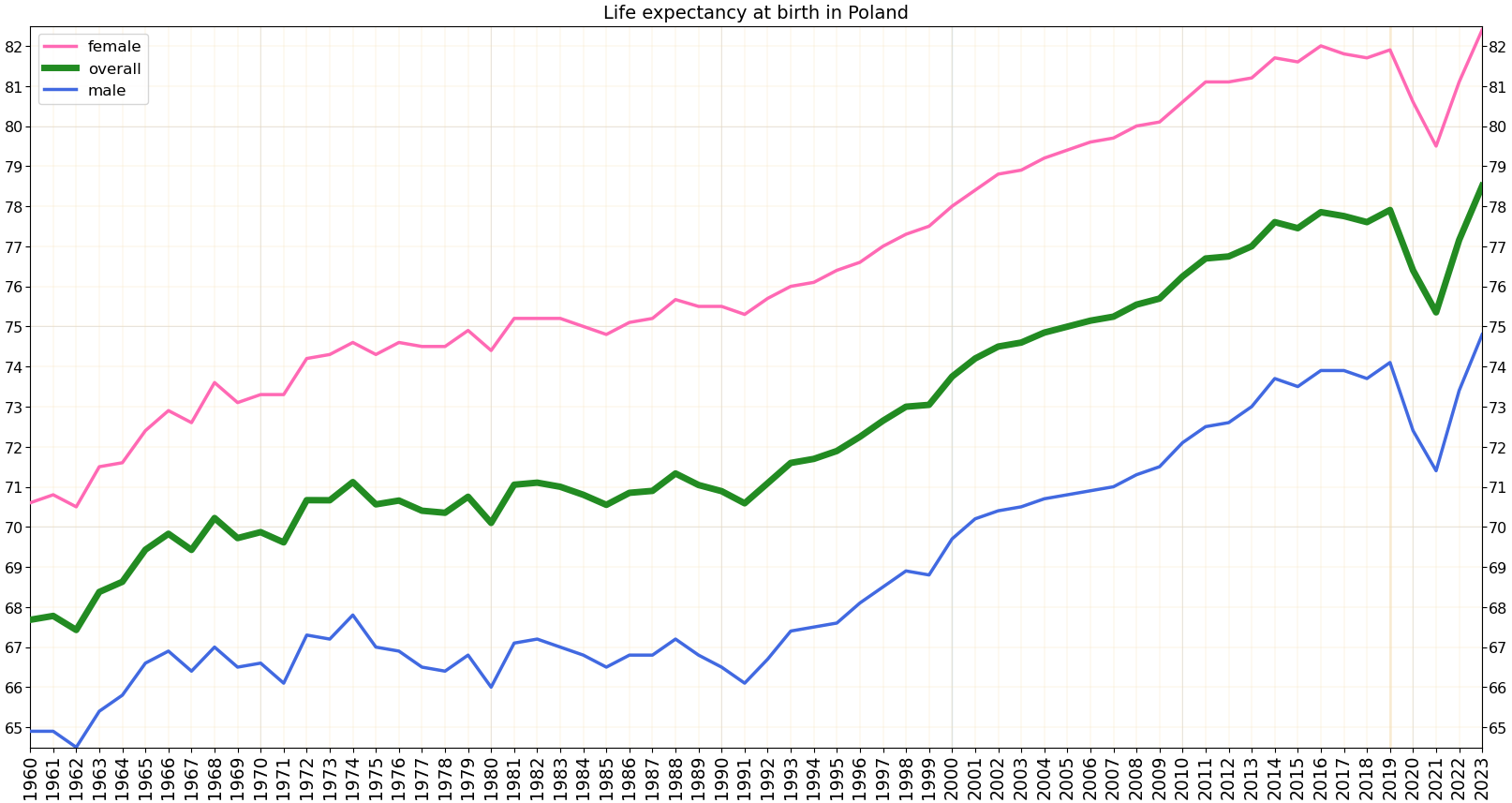
Life expectancy in Poland

According to The Act 240 dated 27.08.2004 about Health Care Public Funding, access to health care services can be provided if patient is able to confirm having health insurance by presenting a document such as an Insurance card, an Insurance card for employee family members or a Pensionary card

Referral is required to get access to:

- Hospital treatment
- Recovery treatment
- Rehabilitation
- Chronic disease care

Referral is not required for patients:

- Suffering from tuberculosis
- Infected with HIV
- Combatants, war invalids, and repression victims
- Blind civilians if they are victims of war
- Privileged soldiers, veterans in case of treatment of injuries and infections during fulfilling duties outside country borders
- Addicted to drugs or alcohol
- Taking medical examination for organ donation

== Emergency medical services ==
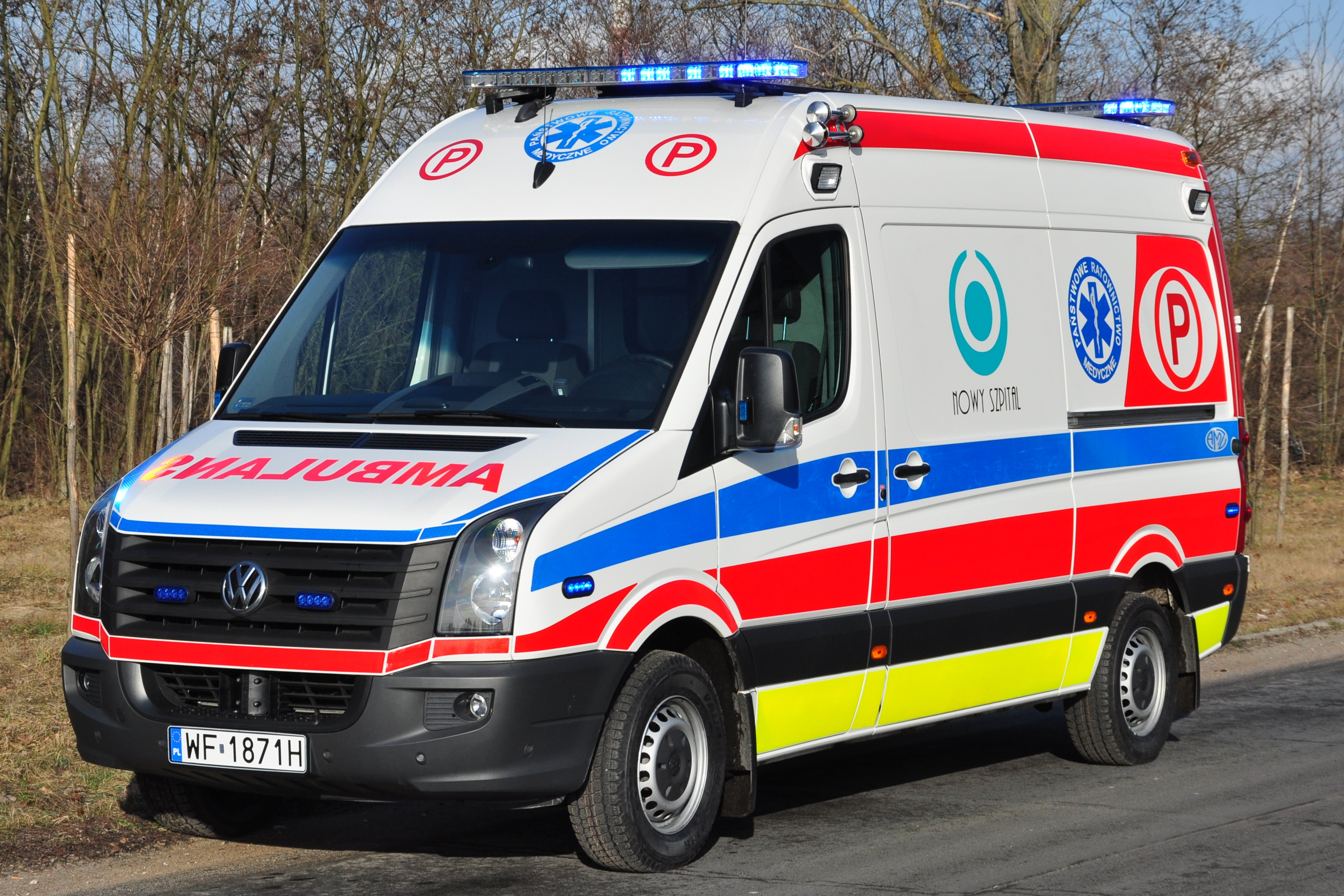
Ambulance in Poland

Emergency Medical Services (Polish: Ratownictwo Medyczne, RM) in Poland are a service of public, pre-hospital emergency healthcare, including ambulance service, provided by the individual Polish cities and counties. Services are typically provided by the local, publicly operated hospital, and are generally funded by the government of Poland. In a number of cases, hospitals contract the services to private operators. In addition to publicly funded services, there are a variety of private-for-profit ambulance services operating independently.

== Problems ==
The health care system in Poland has had problems for many years. According to the Euro health consumer index 2018, Poland was on 32nd place out of 35. The main problems listed in Health Consumer Index 2016 are:

- Difficult access to specialist physicians (especially for hospital treatment) and long waiting times for health services: planned serious surgery more than 90 days, cancer treatment more than 21 days, tomography more than 7 days
- Bad results in cancer treatment: no access to modern medicines and high level of mortality
- Digital structure of health information: difficulties with electronic prescriptions and referrals, no access to examination results or list of authorized physicians

== See also ==
- Health in Poland
- National Centre for Quality Assessment in Healthcare
