= National Health Fund =

Polish health fund

- Narodowy Fundusz Zdrowia
- Logo

Agency overview
- Formed: 2003; 23 years ago
- Jurisdiction: Poland
- Headquarters: Rakowiecka 26/30, Warsaw
- Agency executive: Filip Nowak
- Website: www.nfz.gov.pl

The National Health Fund (Polish: Narodowy Fundusz Zdrowia) is a publicly funded health care system in Poland. It was established by Act of the Sejm of 27 August 2004 on a proposal of Mariusz Lipinski, then the minister of health that there should be just one centralized government institution.

== Overview ==
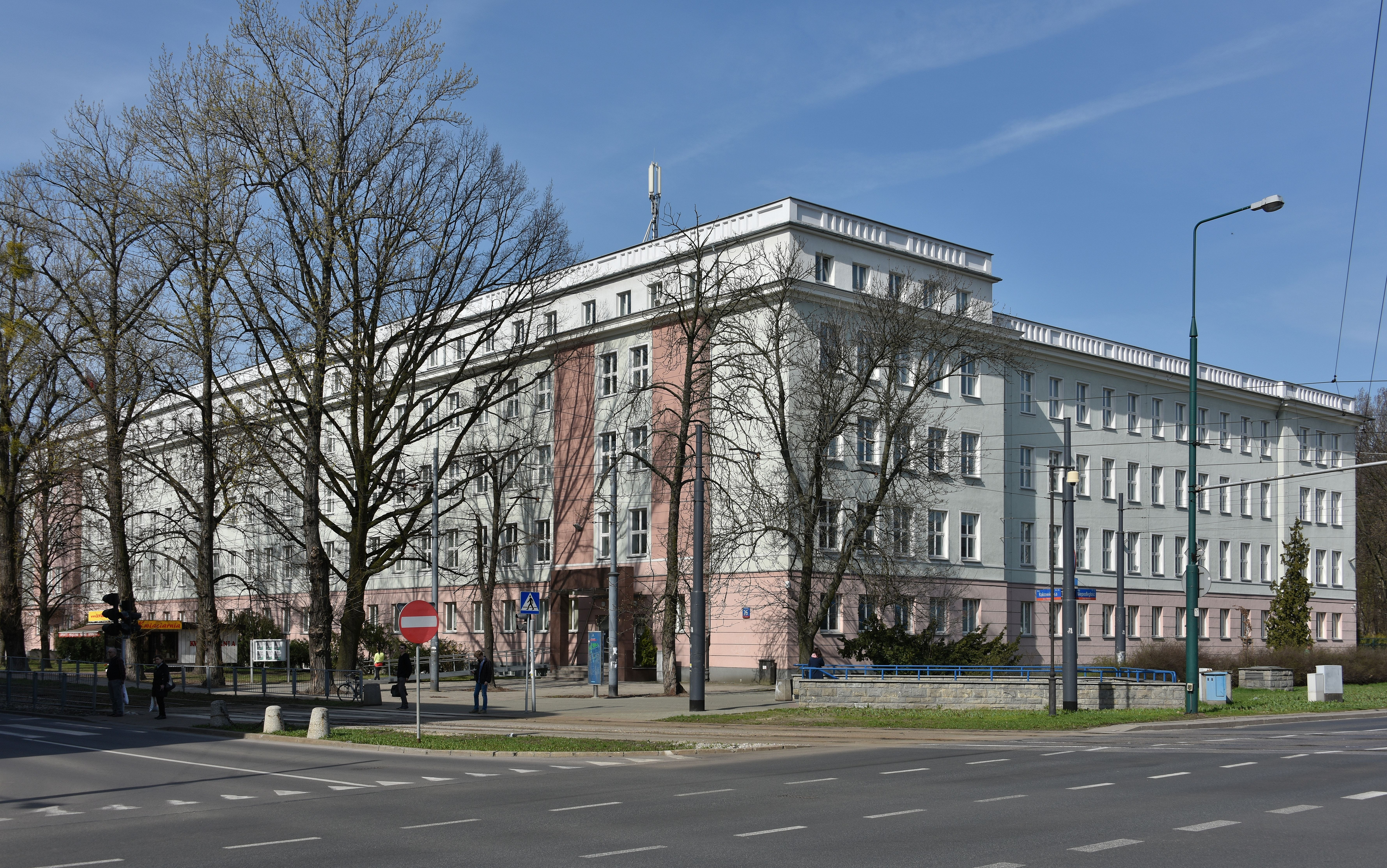
NFZ HQ in Warsaw

NFZ is financed by compulsory health insurance contributions and finances health services provided to insured persons and reimburses the cost of medicines. The President of the Fund is appointed by the Prime Minister at the request of the minister of health after consultation with the Council of the Fund. There is a branch in each of the 16 provinces. In 2015 its income was 69.8 billion Polish złoty and it employed the full-time equivalent of 5,184 people.

It runs a ZIP system, where patients can see their treatment history and costs over the last 10 years. It also authorizes the supply of medical devices, deals with complaints about healthcare providers and issues European Health Insurance Cards.

In 2017 93% of the budget was allocated to hospitals with two-year contracts with the Fund which operate an emergency room. These institutions have an NFZ logo.

== Agency executives ==
- Aleksander Nauman (2003)
- Maciej Tokarczyk (2003)
- Krzysztof Panas (2003–2004)
- Lesław Abramowicz (2004)
- Marek Lejk (2004)
- Jerzy Miller (2004–2006)
- Andrzej Sośnierz (2006–2007)
- Jacek Grabowski (2007)
- Jacek Paszkiewicz (2007–2012)
- Zbigniew Teter (2012)
- Agnieszka Pachciarz (2012–2013)
- Marcin Pakulski (2013–2014)
- Wiesława Anna Kłos (2014)
- Tadeusz Jędrzejczyk (2014–2016)
- Andrzej Jacyna (2016–2018)
- Andrzej Jacyna (2018–2019)
- Adam Niedzielski (2019)
- Adam Niedzielski (2019-2020)
- Filip Nowak (2020–2021)
- Filip Nowak (2021–)

== See also ==
- Health care in Poland
