= Wojciech Maksymowicz =

Polish neurosurgeon and politician

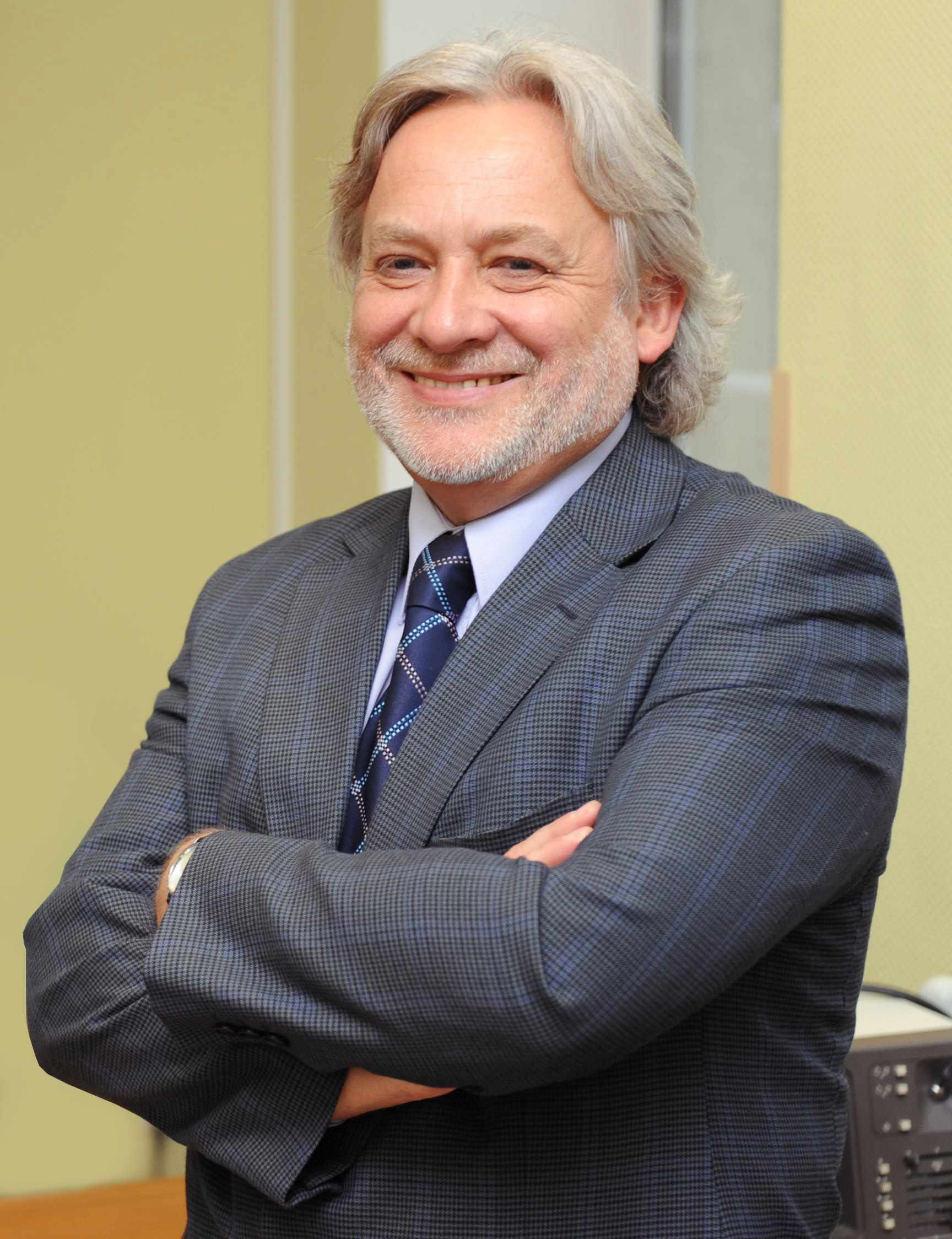
Wojciech Maksymowicz

Wojciech Stefan Maksymowicz (born 24 May 1955 in Włocławek) is a Polish neurosurgeon, from 1997 to 1999 minister of health, since 2019 member of the IX Sejm. Associated with the Agreement political party. In 2021, Maksymowicz left the PiS Parliamentary Club being the second to do so. He left the Agreement on 19 May 2021. He joined Poland 2050 the next day. He left the party on 30 November 2022.
