= 2015 Polish parliamentary election =

- 25 October 2015
- Opinion polls
- Registered: 30,629,150
- Sejm

All 460 seats in the Sejm 231 seats needed for a majority
- Turnout: 15,595,335 (50.92%) ▲2.0 pp
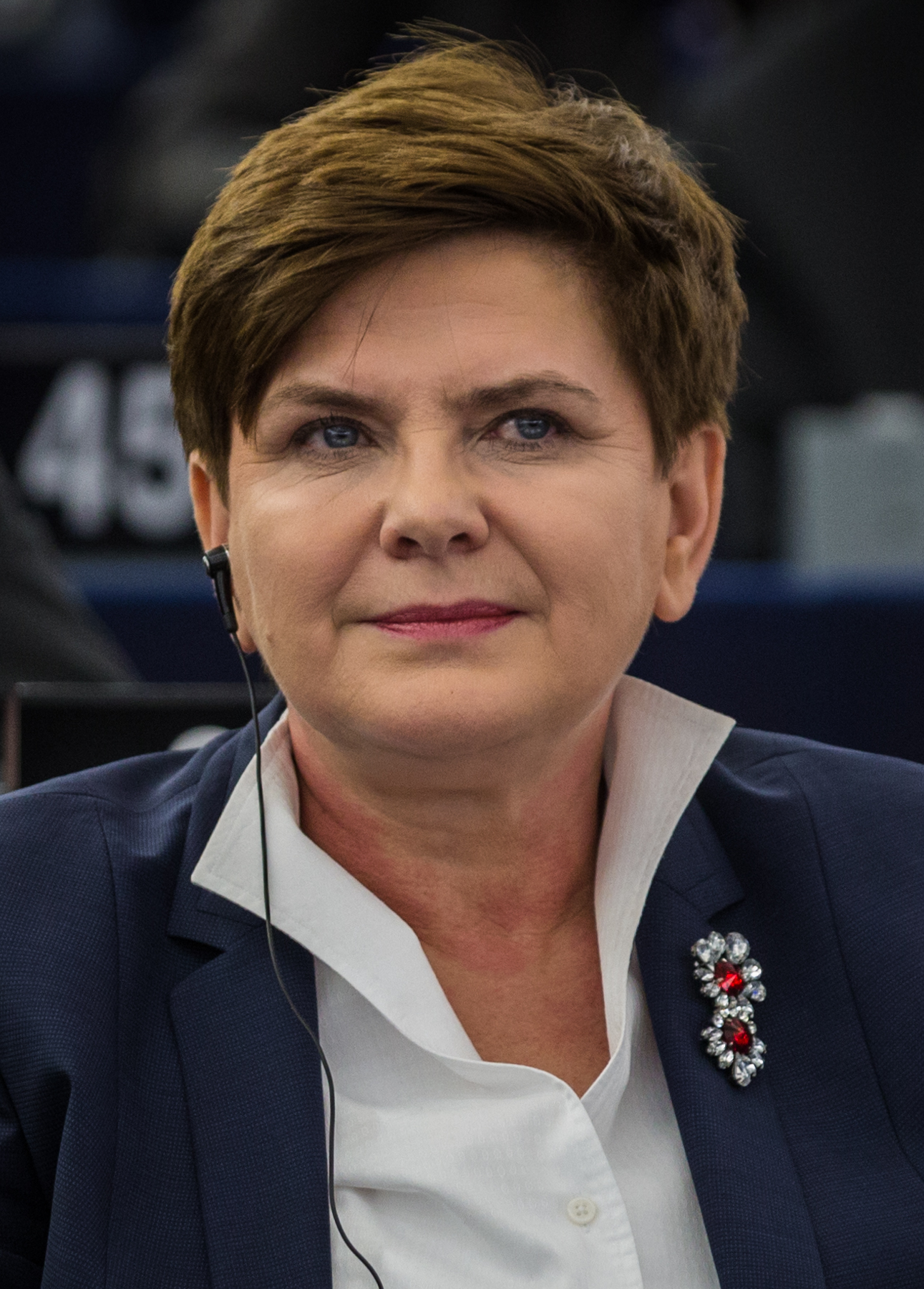

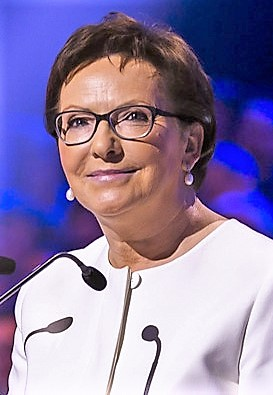

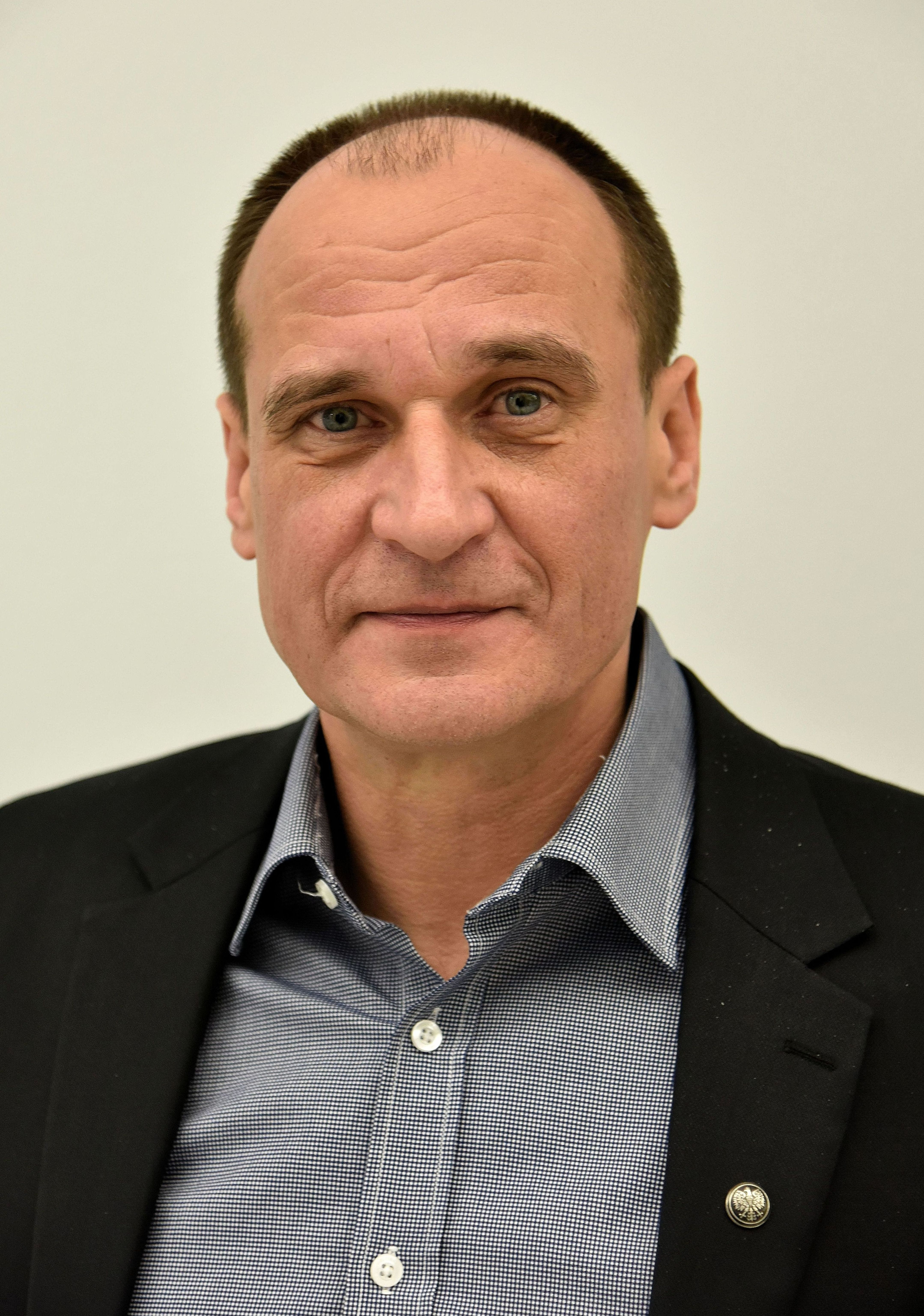

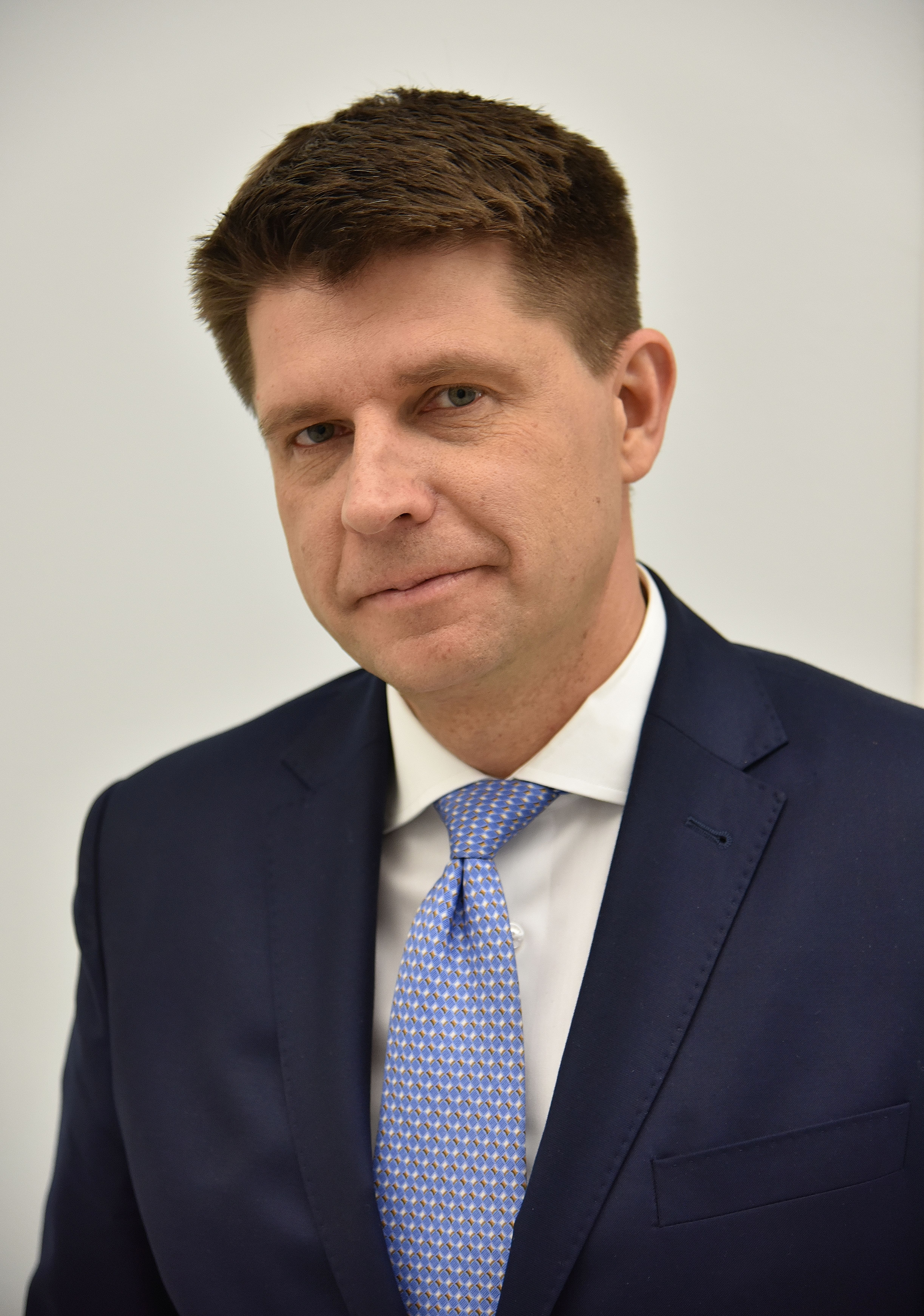

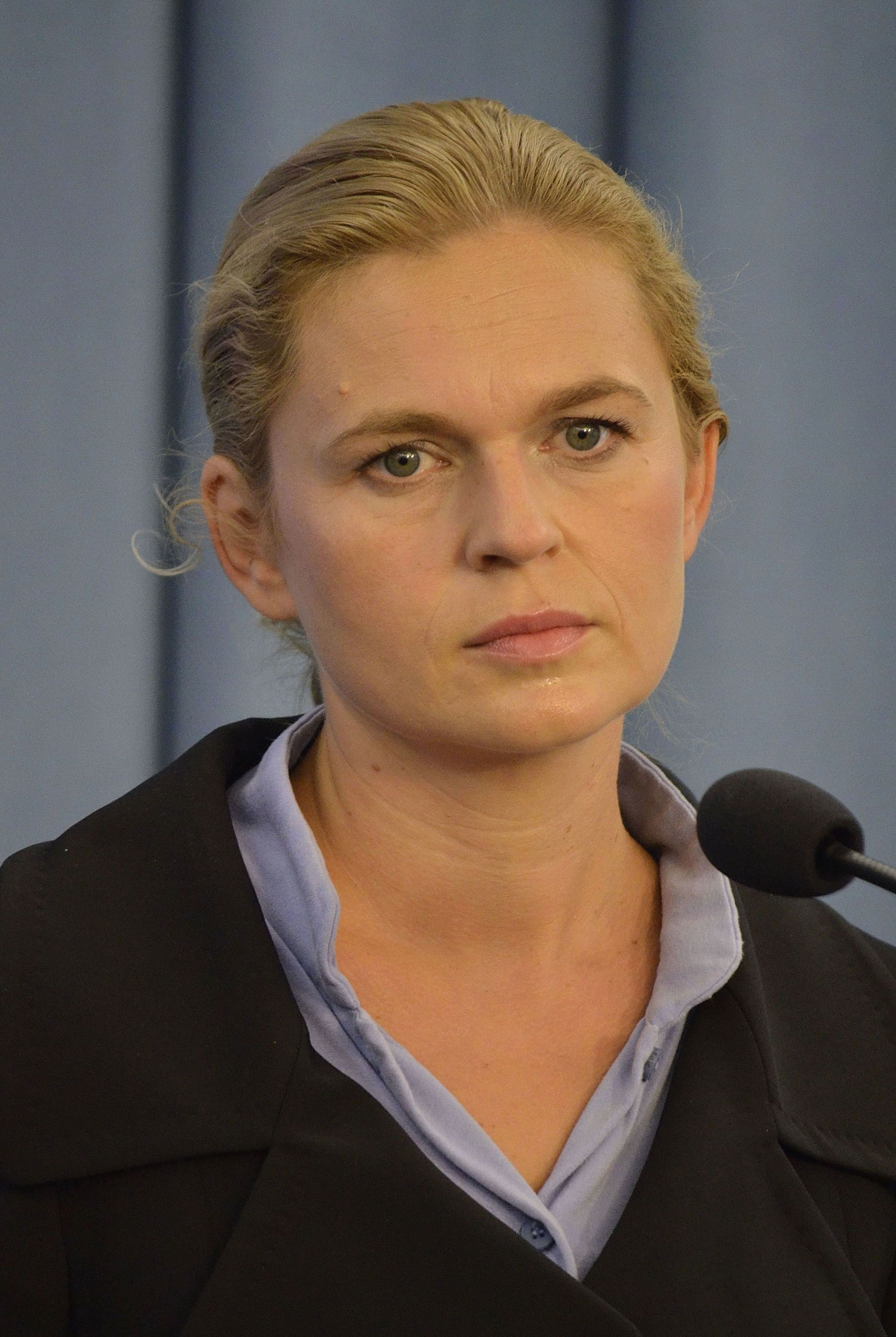

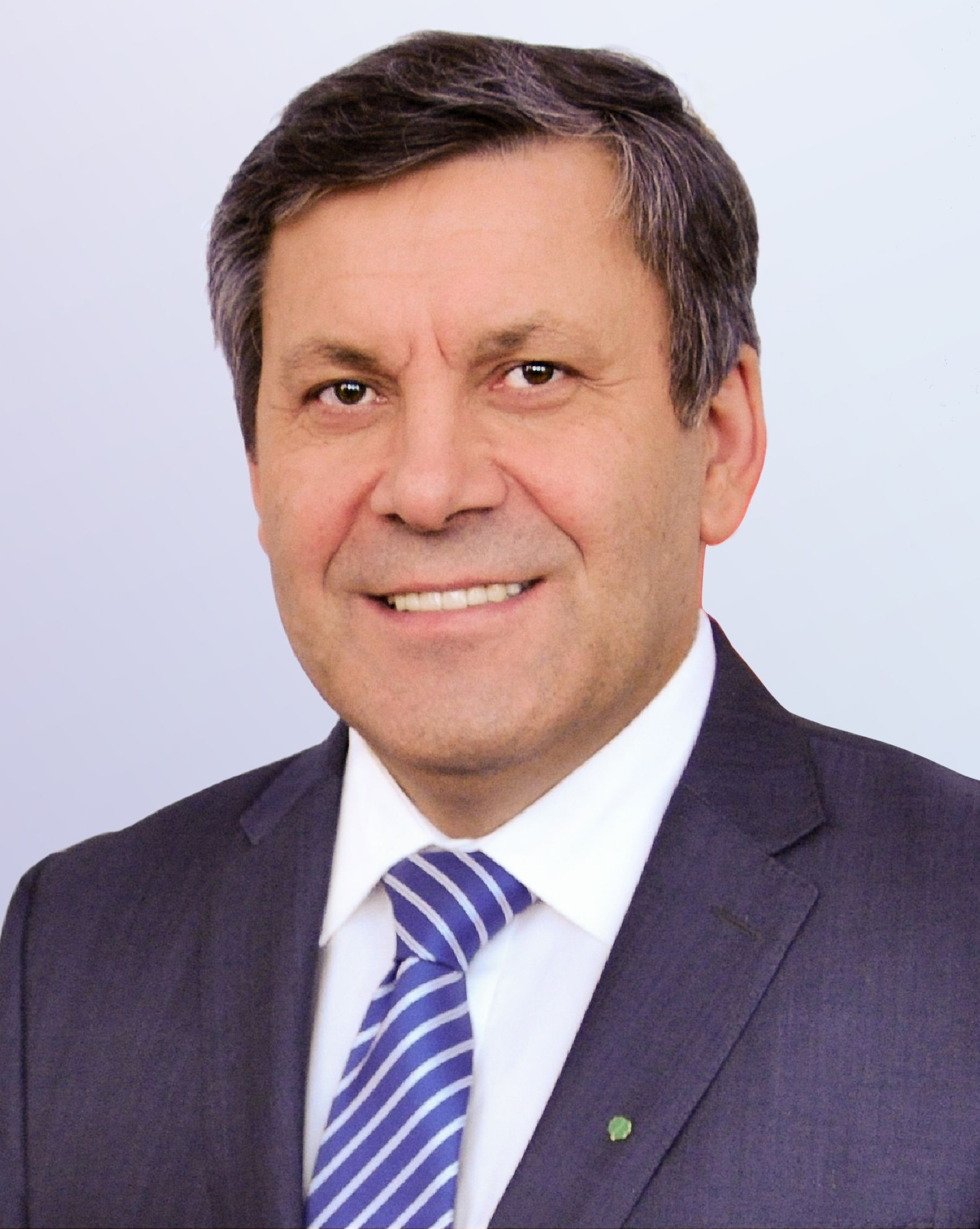
	Majority party	Minority party	Third party
Leader	Beata Szydło (Note: Jarosław Kaczyński, the leader of the Law and Justice party, named Beata Szydło as the prime ministerial candidate)	Ewa Kopacz	Paweł Kukiz
Party	PiS	PO	Kukiz'15
Leader since	22 June 2015	8 November 2014	27 July 2015
Last election	29.89%, 157 seats	39.18%, 207 seats	Did not exist
Seats won	235	138	42
Seat change	▲78	▼69	New
Popular vote	5,711,687	3,661,474	1,339,094
Percentage	37.58%	24.09%	8.81%
Swing	▲7.69 pp	▼15.09 pp	New party
	Fourth party	Fifth party	Sixth party
Leader	Ryszard Petru	Barbara Nowacka	Janusz Piechociński
Party	.N	ZL	PSL
Leader since	31 May 2015	21 July 2015	17 November 2012
Last election	Did not exist	18.81%, 67 seats (Note: Aggregate results for the Democratic Left Alliance (8.24%, 27 seats), Your Movement (10.02%, 40 seats) and Polish Labour Party (0.55%, 0 seats), which became a part of ZL.)	8.36%, 28 seats
Seats won	28	0	16
Seat change	New	▼67	▼12
Popular vote	1,155,370	1,147,102	779,875
Percentage	7.60%	7.55%	5.13%
Swing	New party	▼10.71 pp	▼3.23 pp
- Senate
- All 100 seats in the Senate; 51 seats needed for a majority
- Turnout: 50.92% ▲2.0pp
Party	Vote %	Seats	+/–
PiS	39.99	61	+30
PO	28.85	34	−29
Independent	10.95	4	+1
This lists parties that won seats. See the complete results below.

Government before	Government after
Kopacz cabinet PO—PSL	Szydło cabinet PiS (ZP)

Parliamentary elections were held in Poland on 25 October 2015. All 460 members of the Sejm and 100 senators of the Senate were elected. The election was won by the largest opposition party, the right-wing Law and Justice (PiS), with 38% of the vote against the governing Civic Platform (PO), which achieved 24%. Official results, announced on 27 October, gave Law and Justice 235 of the 460 seats, a majority of four. PiS vice chairwoman Beata Szydło succeeded PO leader Ewa Kopacz as Prime Minister of Poland, heading a one-party cabinet.

It was the first election for a national parliament in Europe since the 1993 Norwegian elections in which the two largest parties were led by a female candidate, and the second election in history (also since the 1993 Norwegian election) where more than three parties fielded female leadership candidates. It was also the first election in Poland since the restoration of full democracy that a party won an absolute majority in the Sejm.

Following PiS's victory in the May 2015 presidential elections, PiS would have control over both the presidency and parliament for the next eight years.

== Electoral system ==
The process of election for the Sejm is through open party-list proportional representation via the D'hondt method in multi-seat constituencies, with a 5% national threshold for single parties and 8% threshold for coalitions (requirements waived for ethnic minorities). The senate is elected using first-past-the-post voting in single-member districts. To be included on a ballot, a senate candidate must present 2,000 signatures of support from their constituents. For Sejm elections, the threshold is 5,000 signatures per constituency, though that requirement is waived for parties that have already registered lists in at least half of all constituencies (21 out of 41 as of this election).

Overall, the Sejm includes 460 MPs. Should a party have 231 or more deputies in Parliament, it has an absolute majority and can thus govern autonomously, without the need for support from other parties. The constitution can be amended with a supermajority of two-thirds, or 307 deputies.

== Election date ==
The date of the election, 25 October, was set by the previous President of Poland, Bronisław Komorowski. The latest possible date for the election to be held was in November 2015, four years after the previous election. Prior to the announcement of the election date, the most likely dates were thought to be in October or November.

In the previous parliamentary elections in 2011 the Civic Platform–Polish People's Party coalition government, in power since 2007, won a second term. All 460 seats in the Sejm and 100 seats in the Senate were up for election.

== Contesting parties ==
=== Nationwide committees ===
Party	Leader	Ideologies	Political spectrum	Political groups of the European Parliament
Civic Platform (PO)	Ewa Kopacz	Christian democracy, Liberal conservatism, Pro-Europeanism	Centre to Centre-right	European People's Party Group (EPP)
Law and Justice (PiS) • Solidary Poland (SP) • Poland Together – United Right (PRZP) • Right Wing of the Republic (PRz)	Jarosław Kaczyński; Beata Szydło (PM candidate)	National conservatism, Social conservatism, Euroscepticism	Right-wing to far-right	European Conservatives and Reformists (ECR)
United Left (ZL) • Democratic Left Alliance (SLD) • Your Movement (TR) • Polish Socialist Party (PPS) • Labour Union (UP) • The Greens (Zieloni) • Polish Labour Party (PPP)	Barbara Nowacka	Social democracy, Social liberalism, Social progressivism, Green politics, Democratic socialism (minority), Feminism	Centre-left to Left-wing	Progressive Alliance of Socialists and Democrats (S&D)
Polish People's Party (PSL)	Janusz Piechociński	Christian democracy, strongly based around Agrarianism, Conservatism	Centre-right	European People's Party Group (EPP)
Parties not in the Sejm before the election are below
Coalition for the Renewal of the Republic - Liberty and Hope (KORWiN)	Janusz Korwin-Mikke	Right libertarianism, Anti-immigration, Hard-Euroscepticism, Paleolibertarianism	Right-wing	Europe of Freedom and Direct Democracy (EFDD)
Kukiz'15 (K'15)	Paweł Kukiz	Populism, Anti-establishment, Anti-particracy	Big tent to Right-wing	
Modern (.N)	Ryszard Petru	Social liberalism, Economic liberalism, Pro-Europeanism	Centre to Centre-right	
Together (Razem)	collective leadership	Social democracy, Democratic socialism, Progressivism	Centre-left to Left-wing	

=== Regional committees ===
Party	Leader	Ideology	Political spectrum	Political groups of the European Parliament
German Minority Electoral Committee (MN)	Ryszard Galla	Regionalism, German minority interests	Centre	
Parties not in the Sejm before the election are below
Congress of the New Right (KNP)	Michał Marusik	Right libertarianism, New Right, Euroscepticism	Right-wing	Europe of Nations and Freedom (ENF)
JOW Bezpartyjni (JOW)	Robert Raczyński	Pro single-member constituency	Big tent	
Committee of Zbigniew Stonoga (KWW ZS)	Zbigniew Stonoga	Anti-communism, Civil libertarianism, Populism	Big tent	
Social Movement of the Republic of Poland (RS RP)	Sławomir Izdebski	Agrarian socialism, Left-wing populism	Left-wing	
United for Silesia (ZdŚ)	Dietmar Brehmer	Silesian regionalism, Fiscal federalism	Centre	
Self-Defence (Samoobrona)	Lech Kuropatwiński	Agrarianism, Left-wing nationalism	Left-wing	
Committee of Grzegorz Braun "God Bless You!" (SzB!)	Grzegorz Braun	Traditionalist conservatism, Polish nationalism, Monarchism	Right-wing to far-right	
Citizens to Parliament (OdP)	Jan Zbigniew Potocki	Liberal democracy	Big tent	

== Opinion polls ==
Graphical summary of opinion polls: Law and Justice Civic Platform Kukiz'15 Modern United Left Polish People's Party KORWiN Together Party Your Movement (Note: Contested election under the United Left (Polish: Zjednoczona Lewica) alliance.) Democratic Left Alliance United Poland (Note: Contested election under the informal United Right (Polish: Zjednoczona Prawica) alliance.) Poland Together Congress of the New Right (Note: Contested election in the lists of Kukiz'15.)

== Results ==
The opposition party, Law and Justice won the election with 37.58% of the vote against the governing Civic Platform, which gained a 24.09% share. Beata Szydło became the new Prime Minister, succeeding Ewa Kopacz. Law and Justice became the first party in Poland to win majority government in a free election, since 1991. The other parties considered winners were two newcomer parties, Kukiz's Movement (third place) and Ryszard Petru's Modern party (4th place).

Two of the biggest losers were Civic Platform and the Polish People's Party. PO suffered its worst result in a parliamentary election in ten years, ending eight years of political dominance. The PSL, the junior partner in the outgoing government, had its worst result in 25 years (5.13%), just crossing the 5% threshold by a few thousand votes. Another perceived loser was the Democratic Left Alliance, Poland's largest left-wing party, which failed to win a seat for the first time since the change of system. The SLD ran as the largest partner of the United Left, which was 0.5% short of the 8% threshold for electoral alliances to win seats.

=== Sejm ===
Results of the Sejm election by electoral district. Blue represents Law and Justice, and orange Civic Platform.

Party	Votes	%	Seats	+/–
United Right	5,711,687	37.58	235	+78
Civic Platform	3,661,474	24.09	138	–69
Kukiz'15	1,339,094	8.81	42	New
Modern	1,155,370	7.60	28	New
United Left	1,147,102	7.55	0	–67
Polish People's Party	779,875	5.13	16	–12
KORWiN	722,999	4.76	0	New
Together	550,349	3.62	0	New
Committee of Zbigniew Stonoga	42,731	0.28	0	New
German Minority Electoral Committee	27,530	0.18	1	0
United for Silesia	18,668	0.12	0	New
JOW Bezpartyjni	15,656	0.10	0	New
Committee of Grzegorz Braun "God Bless You!"	13,113	0.09	0	New
Congress of the New Right	4,852	0.03	0	0
Self-Defence of the Republic of Poland	4,266	0.03	0	0
Social Movement of the Republic of Poland	3,941	0.03	0	New
Citizens to Parliament	1,964	0.01	0	New
Total	15,200,671	100.00	460	0
Valid votes	15,200,671	97.47		
Invalid/blank votes	394,664	2.53		
Total votes	15,595,335	100.00		
Registered voters/turnout	30,629,150	50.92		
Source: PKW

==== Party breakdown ====
Party or alliance		Votes	%	Seats
United Right	Law and Justice	4,487,339	29.52	193
United Right	Independents	746,474	4.91	26
United Right	Sovereign Poland	277,622	1.83	9
United Right	Poland Together	145,358	0.96	6
United Right	Right Wing of the Republic	48,442	0.32	1
United Right	Piast Faction	6,452	0.04	0
United Right	Total	5,711,687	37.58	235
Civic Platform	Civic Platform	3,142,767	20.68	126
Civic Platform	Independents	516,457	3.40	12
Civic Platform	Polish People's Party (Note: Individual members running on lists different from their own parties)	2,250	0.01	0
Civic Platform	Total	3,661,474	24.09	138
Kukiz'15	Independents	1,207,419	7.94	37
Kukiz'15	National Movement	73,641	0.48	3
Kukiz'15	Congress of the New Right	25,831	0.17	1
Kukiz'15	Real Politics Union	12,080	0.08	1
Kukiz'15	Direct Democracy	7,611	0.05	0
Kukiz'15	Right Wing of the Republic	4,409	0.03	0
Kukiz'15	Self-Defence	2,138	0.01	0
Kukiz'15	Libertarian Party	1,664	0.01	0
Kukiz'15	Poland Together	1,306	0.01	0
Kukiz'15	Labour Party	1,061	0.01	0
Kukiz'15	Sovereign Poland	1,012	0.01	0
Kukiz'15	Community	922	0.01	0
Kukiz'15	Total	1,339,094	8.81	42
Modern	Independents	965,130	6.35	23
Modern	Modern	185,188	1.22	5
Modern	Women's Party	3,707	0.02	0
Modern	Polish People's Party	875	0.01	0
Modern	Civic Platform	470	0.00	0
Modern	Total	1,155,370	7.60	28
United Left	Democratic Left Alliance	694,150	4.57	0
United Left	Your Movement	220,326	1.45	0
United Left	Independents	164,345	1.08	0
United Left	The Greens	35,292	0.23	0
United Left	Labour Union	18,181	0.12	0
United Left	Alliance of Democrats	3,796	0.02	0
United Left	Polish Socialist Party	3,621	0.02	0
United Left	Polish Labour Party - August 80	3,586	0.02	0
United Left	Social Democracy of Poland	1,600	0.01	0
United Left	National Party of Retirees and Pensioners	1,098	0.01	0
United Left	Democratic Party – demokraci.pl	850	0.01	0
United Left	Total	1,147,102	7.55	0
Polish People's Party	Polish People's Party	673,483	4.43	16
Polish People's Party	Independents	106,392	0.70	0
Polish People's Party	Total	779,875	5.13	16
KORWiN	KORWiN	480,029	3.16	0
KORWiN	Independents	231,810	1.53	0
KORWiN	Congress of the New Right	8,085	0.05	0
KORWiN	National Movement	2,919	0.02	0
KORWiN	Libertarian Party	88	0.00	0
KORWiN	Total	722,999	4.76	0
Together	Together	501,195	3.30	0
Together	Independents	49,154	0.32	0
Together	Total	550,349	3.62	0
Committee of Zbigniew Stonoga	Independents	42,731	0.28	0
German Minority	Independents	27,530	0.18	1
United for Silesia	Independents	18,668	0.12	0
JOW Bezpartyjni	Independents	15,234	0.10	0
JOW Bezpartyjni	National Party of Retirees and Pensioners	422	0.00	0
JOW Bezpartyjni	Total	15,656	0.10	0
Committee of Grzegorz Braun "God Bless You!"	Independents	11,228	0.07	0
Committee of Grzegorz Braun "God Bless You!"	Unity of the Nation	520	0.00	0
Committee of Grzegorz Braun "God Bless You!"	Real Politics Union	477	0.00	0
Committee of Grzegorz Braun "God Bless You!"	Congress of the New Right	356	0.00	0
Committee of Grzegorz Braun "God Bless You!"	Popular National Alliance	115	0.00	0
Committee of Grzegorz Braun "God Bless You!"	National Movement	139	0.00	0
Committee of Grzegorz Braun "God Bless You!"	Sovereign Poland	77	0.00	0
Committee of Grzegorz Braun "God Bless You!"	League of Polish Families	55	0.00	0
Committee of Grzegorz Braun "God Bless You!"	Community	50	0.00	0
Committee of Grzegorz Braun "God Bless You!"	Law and Justice	43	0.00	0
Committee of Grzegorz Braun "God Bless You!"	Roman Dmowski's National Party	27	0.00	0
Committee of Grzegorz Braun "God Bless You!"	Brave Dad	14	0.00	0
Committee of Grzegorz Braun "God Bless You!"	Right Wing of the Republic	12	0.00	0
Committee of Grzegorz Braun "God Bless You!"	Total	13,113	0.09	0
Congress of the New Right	Congress of the New Right	2,850	0.02	0
Congress of the New Right	Independents	2,002	0.01	0
Congress of the New Right	Total	4,852	0.03	0
Self-Defence	Self-Defence	2,660	0.02	0
Self-Defence	Independents	1,606	0.01	0
Self-Defence	Total	4,266	0.03	0
Social Movement of the Republic of Poland	Social Justice Movement	2,753	0.02	0
Social Movement of the Republic of Poland	Independents	986	0.01	0
Social Movement of the Republic of Poland	White-Red	192	0.00	0
Social Movement of the Republic of Poland	Freedom and Equality	10	0.00	0
Social Movement of the Republic of Poland	Total	3,941	0.03	0
Citizens to Parliament	Independents	1,790	0.01	0
Citizens to Parliament	Alliance of Democrats	155	0.00	0
Citizens to Parliament	Civic Platform	19	0.00	0
Citizens to Parliament	Total	1,964	0.01	0
Total		15,200,346	100.00	460
Source: National Electoral Commission (Note: In result breakdown by candidate provided by the National Electoral Commission, the sum of party votes are different from final released vote totals for coalitions for United Left (by 257) and KORWiN (by 68). In the table, figures provided for each party are taken from the candidate breakdown while coalition sums are taken from the final result.)

==== By constituency ====
Constituency	Turnout	PiS	PO	K'15	.N	ZL	PSL	KORWiN	Together	MN	Others	Lead
1 – Legnica	46.71	35.70	25.24	9.59	7.15	10.45	3.89	4.32	3.64	-	0.00	10.46
2 – Wałbrzych	44.83	31.15	32.65	8.81	6.64	8.76	3.18	4.30	3.41	-	1.09	1.50
3 – Wrocław	54.08	31.21	30.49	8.74	10.65	6.10	2.60	5.22	4.21	-	0.77	0.72
4 – Bydgoszcz	47.87	30.20	29.64	7.77	7.30	10.04	6.07	4.54	3.76	-	0.68	0.56
5 – Toruń	44.90	33.57	25.77	8.32	6.50	10.76	6.75	3.90	3.65	-	0.78	7.80
6 – Lublin	52.01	47.57	16.59	9.32	4.54	5.98	7.74	5.00	2.75	-	0.52	30.98
7 – Chełm	45.30	48.02	12.31	10.47	3.75	7.11	11.39	4.37	2.39	-	0.18	35.71
8 – Zielona Góra	44.63	28.27	28.21	8.75	9.99	10.02	5.12	4.99	3.99	-	0.65	0.06
9 – Łódź	56.74	29.90	31.28	7.24	8.99	10.48	2.70	4.78	4.63	-	0.00	1.38
10 – Piotrków Trybunalski	50.26	46.95	15.46	10.08	5.59	7.47	7.48	3.91	3.06	-	0.00	31.49
11 – Sieradz	48.47	39.93	21.18	8.92	5.32	8.18	7.86	4.10	3.54	-	0.98	18.75
12 – Chrzanów	54.46	49.05	20.42	8.67	5.79	5.33	3.03	4.45	3.26	-	0.00	28.63
13 – Kraków	58.81	38.62	24.61	7.26	9.73	6.38	2.70	6.35	3.88	-	0.48	14.01
14 – Nowy Sącz	52.18	60.56	13.95	7.83	3.69	2.55	4.16	4.31	2.13	-	0.80	46.61
15 – Tarnów	51.85	51.99	14.71	9.60	4.54	3.41	8.08	4.72	2.43	-	0.53	37.28
16 – Płock	46.22	43.78	16.44	8.41	5.15	8.14	10.66	4.07	3.35	-	0.00	27.34
17 – Radom	49.38	47.49	17.55	8.41	4.81	4.82	9.42	3.91	2.62	-	0.98	29.94
18 – Siedlce	50.56	51.10	13.55	8.36	4.63	4.35	10.23	4.35	2.66	-	0.76	37.55
19 – Warsaw I	70.80	29.89	27.54	7.76	13.39	8.55	0.72	6.18	5.54	-	0.43	2.35
20 – Warsaw II	60.00	38.80	25.12	7.22	10.01	5.66	3.80	4.81	3.85	-	0.73	13.68
21 – Opole	43.12	27.77	26.23	12.57	7.14	6.75	3.68	3.95	3.02	8.14	0.75	1.54
22 – Krosno	47.47	53.51	13.76	9.15	3.97	4.56	7.28	4.28	2.32	-	1.17	39.75
23 – Rzeszów	52.56	56.11	13.11	9.28	4.16	4.42	4.67	4.96	2.29	-	1.00	43.00
24 – Białystok	47.10	45.38	16.74	9.07	5.37	7.35	8.07	4.66	2.59	-	0.77	28.64
25 – Gdańsk	52.55	29.61	34.72	7.15	9.17	6.59	3.02	5.00	3.98	-	0.75	5.11
26 – Gdynia	51.28	31.22	33.46	8.02	8.22	6.64	3.23	4.43	4.05	-	0.75	2.24
27 – Bielsko-Biała	56.35	40.42	23.57	9.36	8.27	6.56	3.42	4.68	3.72	-	0.00	16.82
28 – Częstochowa	49.83	35.82	20.95	11.63	6.74	11.12	4.99	4.27	3.64	-	0.84	14.87
29 – Gliwice	49.12	30.51	28.99	12.19	8.90	7.21	2.50	5.09	4.15	-	0.48	1.52
30 – Rybnik	51.82	39.59	24.21	11.31	6.33	5.93	1.79	4.53	3.33	-	2.98	15.38
31 – Katowice	53.92	32.92	28.37	10.05	8.66	6.77	0.99	5.55	4.08	-	2.61	4.55
32 – Sosnowiec	51.41	29.65	25.56	10.24	8.97	13.97	2.35	4.81	4.44	-	0.00	4.09
33 – Kielce	46.82	42.81	17.25	9.41	4.98	7.87	9.51	4.14	2.80	-	1.23	25.56
34 – Elbląg	41.30	31.56	30.12	8.24	5.82	7.69	6.69	4.73	3.80	-	1.34	1.44
35 – Olsztyn	43.13	30.42	27.07	8.97	6.82	8.76	8.44	5.10	3.74	-	0.68	3.35
36 – Kalisz	47.27	31.85	24.69	7.98	7.04	8.82	10.98	4.25	3.17	-	1.23	7.16
37 – Konin	46.64	37.41	20.23	8.83	6.94	11.77	6.86	3.99	3.98	-	0.00	17.18
38 – Piła	46.07	27.26	31.02	9.01	6.98	9.15	7.66	4.07	3.92	-	0.93	3.76
39 – Poznań	60.23	23.90	35.65	6.06	14.49	8.07	1.91	4.77	4.60	-	0.55	11.75
40 – Koszalin	43.63	28.58	30.07	9.41	8.06	11.38	4.13	4.46	3.90	-	0.00	1.49
41 – Szczecin	47.27	29.09	31.93	8.42	8.66	8.56	3.88	5.33	4.12	-	0.00	2.84
Poland	50.92	37.58	24.09	8.81	7.60	7.55	5.13	4.76	3.62	0.18	0.69	13.49

=== Senate ===
Results of the Senate election by single-mandate districts. Blue represents Law and Justice, orange - Civic Platform, green - Polish People Party, grey - independents.

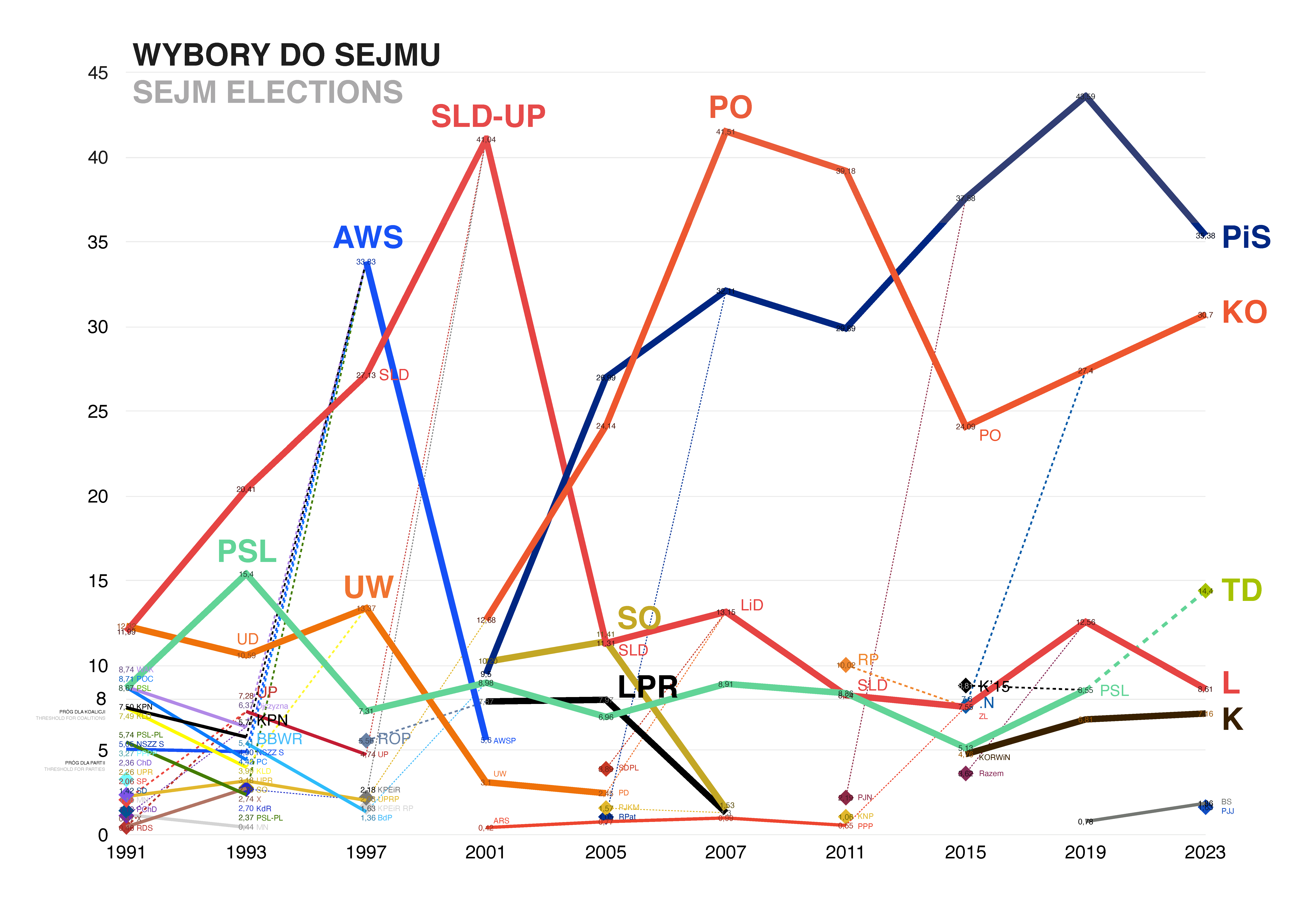
Results of elections 1991–2015

Party	Votes	%	Seats	+/–
Law and Justice	5,993,433	39.99	61	+30
Civic Platform	4,323,789	28.85	34	–29
Polish People's Party	1,109,675	7.40	1	–1
United Left	595,206	3.97	0	0
Modern	394,817	2.63	0	New
Kukiz'15	207,156	1.38	0	New
KORWiN	186,510	1.24	0	New
JOW Bezpartyjni	113,669	0.76	0	New
Citizens to Parliament	84,246	0.56	0	New
Congress of the New Right	79,946	0.53	0	0
Democratic Party	64,829	0.43	0	0
National Revival of Poland	57,012	0.38	0	0
German Minority Electoral Committee	40,472	0.27	0	0
Self-Defence of the Republic of Poland	20,913	0.14	0	0
Social Movement of the Republic of Poland	14,316	0.10	0	New
Whites–Reds	10,973	0.07	0	New
Committee of Zbigniew Stonoga	10,167	0.07	0	New
Slavic Union	9,562	0.06	0	New
Committee of Grzegorz Braun "God Bless You!"	7,916	0.05	0	New
Real Politics Union	6,190	0.04	0	0
Patriotic Poland	6,090	0.04	0	0
National Movement	5,462	0.04	0	New
Labour Party	3,380	0.02	0	0
Piast – Unity of the Thoughts of European Nations	1,786	0.01	0	New
Independents	1,640,571	10.95	4	0
Total	14,988,086	100.00	100	0
Valid votes	14,988,086	96.12		
Invalid/blank votes	604,947	3.88		
Total votes	15,593,033	100.00		
Registered voters/turnout	30,629,150	50.91		
Source: National Electoral Commission

==== By constituency ====
#	Voivodeship	Commission	#	Result	Elected member
1	Lower Silesian	Legnica	I	Law and Justice gain from Civic Coalition	Rafał Ślusarz
2	Lower Silesian	Legnica	II	Law and Justice gain from Civic Coalition	Krzysztof Mróz
3	Lower Silesian	Legnica	III	Law and Justice hold	Dorota Czudowska
4	Lower Silesian	Wałbrzych	I	Civic Coalition hold	Wiesław Kilian
5	Lower Silesian	Wałbrzych	II	Law and Justice gain from Civic Coalition	Aleksander Szwed
6	Lower Silesian	Wrocław	I	Civic Coalition hold	Jarosław Duda
7	Lower Silesian	Wrocław	II	Civic Coalition hold	Barbara Zdrojewska
8	Lower Silesian	Wrocław	III	Independent hold	Jarosław Obremski
9	Kuyavian-Pomeranian	Bydgoszcz	I	Civic Coalition hold	Andrzej Kobiak
10	Kuyavian-Pomeranian	Bydgoszcz	II	Civic Coalition hold	Jan Rulewski
11	Kuyavian-Pomeranian	Toruń	I	Civic Coalition hold	Przemysław Termiński
12	Kuyavian-Pomeranian	Toruń	II	Law and Justice gain from Civic Coalition	Andrzej Mioduszewski
13	Kuyavian-Pomeranian	Toruń	III	Law and Justice gain from Civic Coalition	Józef Łyczak
14	Lublin	Lublin	I	Law and Justice hold	Stanisław Gogacz
15	Lublin	Lublin	II	Law and Justice hold	Grzegorz Czelej
16	Lublin	Lublin	III	Law and Justice hold	Andrzej Stanisławek
17	Lublin	Chełm	I	Independent hold	Grzegorz Bierecki
18	Lublin	Chełm	II	Polish People's Party hold	Józef Zając
19	Lublin	Chełm	III	Law and Justice hold	Jerzy Chróścikowski
20	Lubusz	Zielona Góra	I	Civic Coalition hold	Waldemar Sługocki
21	Lubusz	Zielona Góra	II	Civic Coalition hold	Władysław Komarnicki
22	Lubusz	Zielona Góra	III	Civic Coalition hold	Robert Dowhan
23	Łódź	Łódź	I	Civic Coalition hold	Maciej Grubski
24	Łódź	Łódź	II	Civic Coalition hold	Ryszard Bonisławski
25	Łódź	Sieradz	I	Law and Justice hold	Przemysław Błaszczyk
26	Łódź	Sieradz	II	Law and Justice gain from Civic Coalition	Maciej Łuczak
27	Łódź	Sieradz	III	Law and Justice hold	Michał Seweryński
28	Łódź	Piotrków Trybunalski	I	Law and Justice hold	Wiesław Dobkowski
29	Łódź	Piotrków Trybunalski	II	Law and Justice hold	Rafał Ambrozik
30	Lesser Poland	Kraków	I	Law and Justice hold	Andrzej Pająk
31	Lesser Poland	Kraków	II	Law and Justice hold	Marek Pęk
32	Lesser Poland	Kraków	III	Civic Coalition hold	Jerzy Fedorowicz
33	Lesser Poland	Kraków	IV	Civic Coalition hold	Bogdan Klich
34	Lesser Poland	Tarnów	I	Law and Justice hold	Zbigniew Cichoń
35	Lesser Poland	Tarnów	II	Law and Justice hold	Kazimierz Wiatr
36	Lesser Poland	Nowy Sącz	I	Law and Justice gain from Civic Coalition	Jan Hamerski
37	Lesser Poland	Nowy Sącz	II	Law and Justice hold	Stanisław Kogut
38	Masovian	Płock	I	Law and Justice hold	Marek Martynowski
39	Masovian	Płock	II	Law and Justice hold	Jan Jackowski
40	Masovian	Warszawa	I	Law and Justice gain from Civic Coalition	Jan Żaryn
41	Masovian	Warszawa	II	Law and Justice gain from Civic Coalition	Konstanty Radziwiłł
42	Masovian	Warszawa	III	Independent hold	Marek Borowski
43	Masovian	Warszawa	IV	Civic Coalition hold	Marek Rocki
44	Masovian	Warszawa	V	Civic Coalition hold	Barbara Borys-Damięcka
45	Masovian	Warszawa	VI	Civic Coalition hold	Aleksander Pociej
46	Masovian	Siedlce	I	Law and Justice hold	Robert Mamątow
47	Masovian	Siedlce	II	Law and Justice hold	Maria Koc
48	Masovian	Siedlce	III	Law and Justice hold	Waldemar Kraska
49	Masovian	Radom	I	Law and Justice hold	Stanisław Karczewski
50	Masovian	Radom	II	Law and Justice hold	Adam Bielan
51	Opole	Opole	I	Law and Justice gain from Civic Coalition	Jerzy Czerwiński
52	Opole	Opole	II	Civic Coalition hold	Piotr Wach
53	Opole	Opole	III	Law and Justice gain from Civic Coalition	Grzegorz Peczkis
54	Subcarpathian	Rzeszów	I	Law and Justice hold	Janina Sagatowska
55	Subcarpathian	Rzeszów	II	Law and Justice hold	Zdzisław Pupa
56	Subcarpathian	Rzeszów	III	Law and Justice hold	Aleksander Bobko
57	Subcarpathian	Krosno	I	Law and Justice hold	Alicja Zając
58	Subcarpathian	Krosno	II	Law and Justice hold	Mieczysław Golba
59	Podlaskie	Białystok	I	Law and Justice hold	Bohdan Paszkowski
60	Podlaskie	Białystok	II	Law and Justice gain from Civic Coalition	Jan Dobrzyński
61	Podlaskie	Białystok	III	Law and Justice gain from Independent	Tadeusz Romańczuk
62	Pomeranian	Słupsk	I	Civic Coalition hold	Kazimierz Kleina
63	Pomeranian	Słupsk	II	Law and Justice gain from Civic Coalition	Waldemar Bonkowski
64	Pomeranian	Słupsk	III	Civic Coalition hold	Sławomir Rybicki
65	Pomeranian	Gdańsk	I	Civic Coalition hold	Bogdan Borusewicz
66	Pomeranian	Gdańsk	II	Law and Justice gain from Civic Coalition	Antoni Szymański
67	Pomeranian	Gdańsk	III	Civic Coalition hold	Leszek Czarnobaj
68	Silesian	Częstochowa	I	Law and Justice gain from Civic Coalition	Ryszard Majer
69	Silesian	Częstochowa	II	Law and Justice gain from Civic Coalition	Artur Warzocha
70	Silesian	Katowice	I	Law and Justice gain from Civic Coalition	Krystian Probierz
71	Silesian	Katowice	II	Civic Coalition hold	Maria Pańczyk-Pozdziej
72	Silesian	Bielsko-Biała	I	Law and Justice gain from Civic Coalition	Adam Gawęda
73	Silesian	Bielsko-Biała	II	Law and Justice gain from Civic Coalition	Wojciech Piecha
74	Silesian	Katowice	III	Civic Coalition hold	Leszek Piechota
75	Silesian	Katowice	IV	Law and Justice gain from Civic Coalition	Czesław Ryszka
76	Silesian	Katowice	V	Law and Justice gain from Civic Coalition	Arkadiusz Grabowski
77	Silesian	Katowice	VI	Law and Justice gain from Civic Coalition	Michał Potoczny
78	Silesian	Bielsko-Biała	III	Law and Justice gain from Civic Coalition	Andrzej Kamiński
79	Silesian	Bielsko-Biała	IV	Law and Justice hold	Tadeusz Kopeć
80	Silesian	Katowice	VII	Civic Coalition gain from Independent	Andrzej Misiołek
81	Świętokrzyskie	Kielce	I	Law and Justice hold	Jacek Włosowicz
82	Świętokrzyskie	Kielce	II	Law and Justice hold	Jarosław Rusiecki
83	Świętokrzyskie	Kielce	III	Law and Justice hold	Krzysztof Słoń
84	Warmian-Masurian	Elbląg	I	Civic Coalition hold	Jerzy Wcisła
85	Warmian-Masurian	Elbląg	II	Law and Justice gain from Civic Coalition	Bogusława Orzechowska
86	Warmian-Masurian	Olsztyn	I	Independent gain from Civic Coalition	Lidia Staroń
87	Warmian-Masurian	Olsztyn	II	Law and Justice gain from Civic Coalition	Małgorzata Kopiczko
88	Greater Poland	Piła	I	Civic Coalition hold	Mieczysław Augustyn
89	Greater Poland	Piła	II	Civic Coalition hold	Jan Libicki
90	Greater Poland	Poznań	I	Civic Coalition hold	Piotr Florek
91	Greater Poland	Poznań	II	Civic Coalition hold	Jadwiga Rotnicka
92	Greater Poland	Konin	I	Law and Justice gain from Civic Coalition	Robert Gaweł
93	Greater Poland	Konin	II	Law and Justice gain from Civic Coalition	Margareta Budner
94	Greater Poland	Kalisz	I	Civic Coalition hold	Marian Poślednik
95	Greater Poland	Kalisz	II	Law and Justice gain from Polish People's Party	Łukasz Mikołajczyk
96	Greater Poland	Kalisz	III	Law and Justice gain from Civic Coalition	Andrzej Wojtyła
97	West Pomeranian	Szczecin	I	Civic Coalition hold	Tomasz Grodzki
98	West Pomeranian	Szczecin	II	Civic Coalition hold	Grzegorz Napieralski
99	West Pomeranian	Koszalin	I	Civic Coalition hold	Grażyna Sztark
100	West Pomeranian	Koszalin	II	Civic Coalition hold	Piotr Zientarski

== Reactions ==
Political analysts noted that the election marked the first time in the post-communist era that a political party received enough votes to form a majority government. BBC News suggested that Law and Justice's strategy of putting forward Szydło as its candidate for prime minister was a "winning formula" in the election. Szydło was widely perceived as being more moderate than PiS' outspoken leader, Jarosław Kaczyński. However, it also noted that Kaczyński could step into the role of prime minister after the election.

According to the Associated Press, the new Sejm was the most right-wing parliament in Europe due to the absence of centre-left MPs in the chamber. All five parties in the Sejm tilted rightward on social issues. Between them, left-leaning alliances only gained 11 percent of the vote.

Kopacz swiftly conceded defeat after exit polls from TVP showed PiS on its way to a majority, while Kaczyński declared victory and hailed his party's historic majority. Kaczyński also paid tribute to his late brother, President Lech Kaczyński, who died in the 2010 plane crash.

== See also ==
- History of Poland (1989–present)
- List of political parties in Poland
- 2015 Polish presidential election
- 2015 Polish Constitutional Court crisis
