= Citizens to Parliament =

Citizens to Parliament was an electoral committee of voters running in the 2015 Polish parliamentary election.

== History ==
The committee was founded by, amongst others, independent local government officials, entrepreneurs (and affiliated organizations) and social organizations (foundations and associations, including one led by Jerzy Krzekotowski). The name was inspired by the "Citizens to Senate", starting in 2011. The OdP selected Jan Zbigniew Potocki as their leader, an entrepreneur living in Germany. For the Sejm, the committee put out a complete slate of candidates in the Warszaw constituency (19), with former Civic Platform councilman Mariola Rabczon-Mazowiecka, Krystyna Krzekotowska (Alliance of Democrats - SD), and Bożena Łojko being the first three names on the list. Besides Krystyna Krzekotowska, another SD and PO activist, OdP hosted independents on its slate. In elections to the Senate, the committee put out three candidates: two in Masovia and one in Lower Silesia - in Jelenia Góra constituency (2), OdP's candidate was Kazimierz Klimek, in one of Warsaw's constituencies (44), it started Katarzyna Pawlak from the Democratic Left Alliance, and in Ostrołęka (46) it started Jerzy Strzelecki from Organisation of the Polish Nation – Polish League.

== Ideology ==
In the party's program for women, it concentrated on tax reform, changing the educational system and reforming healthcare (it supported, for example, liquidating NFZ), construction, housing and agriculture. It also supported ending the party subsidy system.

== Electoral results ==
It received 1,964 votes (0,01%) in the Sejm, and failed to win any seats in the Senate.

== Bibliography ==
- Krystyna Krzekotowska: Obywatele do Parlamentu a MARSZ REFERENDALNY, wiadomosci24.pl, 7 July 2015
- OdP's program from its page
