= Jarosław Gromadzki =

Polish politician (born 1979)

Member of the Sejm of Poland
- In office 19 December 2014 – 11 November 2015
- Constituency: No. 26

Personal details
- Born: 15 September 1979 (age 47) Słupsk, Poland
- Party: Normal Country (since 2021)
- Other political affiliations: Stonoga Polish Party (2015); Democratic Left Alliance (2014–2015); Palikot's Movement (2011)
- Education: University of Social Sciences in Łódź

Jarosław Gromadzki (Polish: [jaˈrɔ.swaf ɡrɔˈmat͡s.ki]; born 15 September 1979) is a Polish politician and IT specialist. From 2014 to 2015, he was a member of the Sejm of Poland, belonging to the Democratic Left Alliance.

== Biography ==
Jarosław Gromadzki was born on 15 September 1979 in Słupsk, Poland. He graduated from the University of Social Sciences in Łódź with a degree in information technology with a specialty in the computer systems and networks, and a title of an engineer. He worked as an IT specialist in Słupsk.

In 2011, he joined the Palikot's Movement party, and unsuccessfully run to the Sejm of Poland in the parliamentary election from the constituency no. 26. He left his party after the election. On 19 December 2014, he was appointed to the Sejm, replacing Robert Biedroń, where he joined the parliamentary group of Democratic Left Alliance. He left it in June 2015, joining the Stonoga Polish Party, unsuccessfully running as its candidate for the reelection to the Sejm. The party was disbanded shortly after the election. In 2021, he joined the party Normal Country, becoming its board member in 2022.
