= Senate Constituency no. 2 =

Senate constituency in Poland

- Okręg wyborczy nr 2
- Constituency for the Senate of Poland
- Location within Poland.
- Counties: Jawor, Jelenia Góra, Kamienna Góra, Karkonosze, Złotoryja
- Voivodeship: Lower Silesian
- Population: 266,109 (June 2023)
- Electorate: 209,160 (2023)
- Area: 2,289 km^{2} (884 sq mi)

Current constituency
- Created: 2011
- Party: Civic Platform (KO)
- Senator: Marcin Zawiła
- Regional assembly: Lower Silesian Voivodeship Sejmik
- Sejm constituency: 1 (Legnica)
- EP constituency: Lower Silesian and Opole

Senate Constituency no. 2 (Polish: Okręg wyborczy nr 2) is a single-member constituency for the Senate of Poland in Lower Silesian Voivodeship, comprising counties of Jawor, Kamienna Góra, Karkonosze, Złotoryja and city county of Jelenia Góra. Incumbent senator is Marcin Zawiła, member of the Civic Platform party, affiliated with the Civic Coalition parliamentary group.

== Senators ==
Election	Senator	Party
2011	Józef Pinior	Civic Platform
2015	Krzysztof Mróz	Law and Justice
2019	Krzysztof Mróz	Law and Justice
2023	Marcin Zawiła	Civic Platform

== Elections ==
=== 2011 ===
2011 parliamentary election
Candidate	Party	Votes	%
Józef Pinior	Civic Platform	40,703	41.01
Tadeusz Lewandowski	Law and Justice	21,966	22.13
Wojciech Chadży	Democratic Left Alliance	19,799	19.95
Zbigniew Skowron	Polish People's Party	9,896	9.97
Sylwester Baćko	Independent (Note: Voters Election Committee)	6,877	6.93
Total		99,241	100.00
Valid votes		99,241	92.63
Invalid/blank votes		7,897	7.37
Total votes		107,138	100.00
Registered voters/turnout		238,761	44.87
Source: National Electoral Commission

=== 2015 ===
2015 parliamentary election
Candidate	Party	Votes	%
Krzysztof Mróz	Law and Justice	31,790	31.08
Hubert Papaj	Civic Platform	26,009	25.43
Jerzy Pokój	Independent	16,828	16.45
Andrzej Dobrowolski	United Left	14,256	13.94
Zbigniew Skowron	Polish People's Party	7,323	7.16
Kazimierz Klimek	Citizens to Parliament	6,063	5.93
Total		102,269	100.00
Valid votes		102,269	96.29
Invalid/blank votes		3,937	3.71
Total votes		106,206	100.00
Registered voters/turnout		232,902	45.60
Source: National Electoral Commission

=== 2019 ===
2019 parliamentary election
Candidate	Party	Votes	%
Krzysztof Mróz	Law and Justice	49,938	39.68
Jerzy Pokój	Civic Coalition	48,770	38.75
Kazimierz Klimek	Polish Left	27,158	21.58
Total		125,866	100.00
Valid votes		125,866	97.52
Invalid/blank votes		3,197	2.48
Total votes		129,063	100.00
Registered voters/turnout		222,778	57.93
Source: National Electoral Commission

=== 2023 ===
2023 parliamentary election
Candidate	Party	Votes	%
Marcin Zawiła	Civic Coalition	61,199	42.03
Krzysztof Mróz	Law and Justice	44,522	30.57
Damian Misztela	Our Left	12,193	8.37
Marek Obrębalski	Nonpartisan Local Government Activists	11,464	7.87
Robert Pawelczyk	Poland 2050 (Note: Not to be confused with Poland 2050)	9,170	6.30
Patryk Straus	New Democracy - Yes	7,071	4.86
Total		145,619	100.00
Valid votes		145,619	98.10
Invalid/blank votes		2,815	1.90
Total votes		148,434	100.00
Registered voters/turnout		209,160	70.97
Source: National Electoral Commission
