= Stonoga Polish Party =

Political organization in Poland

Stonoga Polish Party Stonoga Partia Polska
- Abbreviation: SPP
- Chairman: Zbigniew Stonoga
- Founded: 27 June 2015
- Dissolved: 1 November 2015
- Headquarters: 235/247 Independence Avenue, Warsaw, Poland
- Ideology: Conservatism; Populism; Free-market liberalism Anti-communism
- Political position: Right-wing
- Colors: Red; White
- Slogan: God, Honour, Fatherland, and Decommunisation (Polish: Bóg, Honor, Ojczyzna oraz dekomunizacja)

Website
- partiastonogi.pl

The Stonoga Polish Party (Polish pronunciation: [stɔˈnɔ.ɡa]; Polish: Stonoga Partia Polska, SPP) was a populist political party in Poland, which operated from 27 June 2015 to 1 November 2015. It was founded by businessman, activist, and internet personality Zbigniew Stonoga.

== History ==
In December 2014, Zbigniew Stonoga, a businessman, activist, and internet personality, announced he left from the Congress of the New Right, with intention of creating his own political party, the Stonoga Polish Party, as well as running for president of Poland in the 2015 elections. He also stated the party would not accept former members of the Congress of the New Right and the National Movement. In January 2015, Stonoga withdrew his party's application for registration, and resigned from running in the elections, instead endorsing Janusz Korwin-Mikke. In May 2015, Stonoga again announced the creation of his party, with the founding congress taking place on 27 June. Jarosław Gromadzki, a member of the Sejm, who left the Democratic Left Alliance, was involved in the party creation.

As the party missed deadline to be registered, its members run in the 2015 parliamentary election as part of the Zbigniewa Stonoga's Electors Election Committee (Polish: Komitet Wyborczy Wyborców Zbigniewa Stonogi). It registed candidates for the Sejm in 19 of 41 constituencies. Its registration was invalidated in the constituency no. 41 in the West Pomeranian Voivodeship, after it was discovered its members forgered signatures in its application. Among party's candidates were Jarosław Gromadzki, former member of parliament Danuta Hojarska, and athlete Rafał Sikora. The party also had one candidate for the Senate. The District Court in Warsaw registed the party on 14 September 2015. The Stonoga Polish Party failed to win any seats in Sejm, receiving only 0.28% of votes, ending at the 9th place. Its only candidate to the Senate also did not win in their constituency. The party was disbanded on 1 November 2015, soon after the elections.

== Politician programme ==
Stonoga and his party were considered conservative, and populist; Stonoga became popular for his fights and arguments with Polish police, financial government institutions, and MPs, revealing the unfair treatment of government officials towards the people. The party's views have also been described as pro-free market and anti-communist. Stonoga attempted to syncretize the appeal of populist anti-establishment politicians before him, such as Janusz Palikot (from whom he borrowed the proposal to decriminalise soft drugs), and Janusz Korwin-Mikke. Stonoga's party had anti-communist views, and also spoke against immigration and Zionism. Stonoga also expressed antisemitic and anti-German views, calling journalists "Jews" and calling liberal Gazeta Wyborcza "Jude Zeitung".

Prior to founding his own party, Stonoga was associated with the Congress of the New Right, but he distanced himself from it after being criticized for working together with a socialist activist Piotr Ikonowicz. Anyone who previously served in the Sejm or Senate was barred from joining the party. The slogan of the party was "God, Honour, Fatherland, and Decommunisation". Some commentators argued that Stonoga aimed to appeal to the supporters of Law and Justice and Kukiz'15, while others argued that he rather appeals to the voters of Civic Platform. Stonoga himself stated: "I’ve weakened the party that couldn’t care less about Poles, namely the PO. I’m not attacking PiS, but the whole lot of them need to get some help."

Stonoga argued that there is "no right-wing party in Poland", stating that the Polish right is only "an arm or leg of the left". At the same time, he spoke warmly of the left-wing Self-Defence of the Republic of Poland (Samoobrona) and its late leader Andrzej Lepper. Former Samoobrona's MP, Danuta Hojarska, attended Stonoga's party conference, where she was warmly welcomed and Stonoga argued that Polish "farmers are wrongly considered to be stupid rednecks in rubber boots". He also argued that Lepper did not commit suicide, but was murdered instead. Hojarska would ultimately run on SPP's electoral list for the Sejm, stating her belief that SPP could become the "second Samoobrona".

During the 2015 parliamentary election, the political promises of the Stonoga Polish Party included:

- baring people from holding public offices, if they held them prior to 1990;
- introducing personal property liability for government clerks and public officials for errors in their work;
- changes to the tax law, including the introduction of a single value-added tax rate of 15% with exemptions for some individuals, income tax exemptions, and the introduction of the corporate income tax for retail chains and corporations, and tax exemption for start-up entrepreneurs and young married couples;
- replacement of the National Health Fund with the health insurance fund institutions;
- disestablishing the Social Insurance Institution and the Agricultural Social Insurance Fund, with their founds being moved to private retirement accounts;
- increasing penalties for certain crimes;
- disestablishing the City Guard and the tax inspection authorities, transferring their competences to the Police;
- mandatory removal of debtors with debts up to 25,000 PLN from bank and financial databases;
- decriminalisation of soft drug possession.
