= United for Silesia =

United for Silesia was an electoral committee of voters contesting the 2015 Polish parliamentary election on the territory of the Silesian Voivodeship. It was created primarily by activists of the German minority and Silesian Autonomy Movement. It was formally recognized as a committee of the German minority, so that it would not have to cross the 5% electoral threshold.

The committee was founded on the initiative of the Socio-cultural Association Silesian Voivodeship Germans and the German Community "Reconciliation and Future", led by Dietmar Brehmer. Silesian organizations, like RAŚ, were invited to participate in the committee. The Upper Silesian Union firmly declined the invitation. The committee declared it would run for the Sejm in three constituencies: Katowice (31), Gliwice (29) and Rybnik (30). Dietmar Brehmer became the campaign staff chairman. Ultimately, it only registered in Kraków and Rybnik, and did not field candidates for the Senate. In Katowice, the first two names on the ZdŚ list were Zbigniew Kadłubek (RAŚ) and Dietmar Brehmer. In Rybnik, the first two were Anna Ronin (German minority activist) and Marek Polok (RAŚ).

The committee received 18,668 votes (0.12%), and did not receive any seats.
