= Opinion polling for the 2015 Polish parliamentary election =

In the run up to the 2015 Polish parliamentary election, various organisations carry out opinion polling to gauge voting intention in Poland. Results of such polls are displayed in this article.

The date range for these opinion polls are from the previous parliamentary election, held on 9 October 2011, to 23 October 2015.

== Opinion polls ==
=== Graphical summary ===
Graphical summary of opinion polls: Law and Justice Civic Platform Kukiz'15 Modern United Left Polish People's Party KORWiN Together Party Your Movement (Note: Contested election under the United Left (Polish: Zjednoczona Lewica) alliance.) Democratic Left Alliance United Poland (Note: Contested election under the informal United Right (Polish: Zjednoczona Prawica) alliance.) Poland Together Congress of the New Right (Note: Contested election in the lists of Kukiz'15.)

=== First round ===
==== 2015 ====
Dates of Polling	Polling Firm/Link	PO	PiS	PSL	SLD	TR	Kukiz'15	.N	KORWiN	Razem	Others/Undecided	Lead
25 October 2015	Election results	24.1	37.6	5.1	7.6		8.8	7.6	4.8	3.6	0.8	13.5
25 October	Late polls Ipsos	23.6	37.7	5.2	7.5		8.7	7.7	4.9	3.9	0.8	14.1
25 October	Exit polls Ipsos	23.4	39.1	5.2	6.6		9.0	7.1	4.9	3.9	0.8	15.7
22–23 October	IBRiS	22.4	37.4	5.5	8.9		10.2	7.8	3.7	3.4	0.7	15.0
22 October	IBRiS	24.4	35.3	4.7	8.1		6.7	6.2	4.4	2.5	7.7	10.9
21–22 October	Estymator	23	37	6	8		8	6	6	5	1	14
20–22 October	Millward Brown	20	32	5	9		6	8	6	1	13	12
17–22 October	Ipsos	22.1	38.3	6.5	8.1		12.5	6.6	3.5	1.7	0.7	16.2
21 October	IBRiS	23.0	37.0	5.1	8.9		5.9	6.4	4.1	3.9	5.7	14.0
21 October	TNS Poland	24.1	37.8	4.8	8.6		9.1	6.6	4.9	3.5	0.6	13.7
15–21 October	CBOS	25	36	5	6		6	5	4	1	11	11
19–20 October	TNS Poland	26.3	32.5	4.8	7.5		10.4	6.1	5.3	0.3	7.1	6.2
19 October	IBRiS	22	36	6	11		6	6	4	1	9	14
16–19 October	Dobra Opinia	24.5	39.5	6.0	9		7.5	6.0	4.5	2.0	1.0	15.0
16 October	IBRiS	22.9	35.3	5.5	10.7		5.3	7.1	3.8	0.9	8.5	12.4
14–15 October	IPSOS	22	36	5	8		8	4	5	1	11	14
13–15 October	Millward Brown	22	32	5	10		5	7	5	1	13	10
7–15 October	CBOS	27	34	3	6		8	7	3	1	11	7
14 October	TNS Poland	30.1	38.9	5.5	7.9		5.5	6.7	4.7	0.0	0.7	8.8
13–14 October	Estymator	24	40	6	9		6	4	7	1	3	16
13 October	IBRiS	20.3	36.2	6.4	11.1		5.9	8.4	3.1	0.5	7.9	15.9
8 October	IBRiS	22.2	35.8	6.7	9.3		6.2	8.6	2.3	0.2	8.1	13.6
7–8 October	Ipsos	25	36	6	8		7	5	3	0	10	11
7–8 October	Millward Brown	19	35	5	11		5	8	5	1	12	16
7 October	TNS Poland	27.7	42	3.7	8.8		6	8	3.1	0.0	0.7	14.3
2–7 October	TNS Poland	24	36	4	4		6	4	3	0	19	12
6 October	IBRiS	23.8	33.4	6.6	9.5		5.8	9.3	3.2	0.0	8.5	9.4
30 Sep – 5 Oct	Dobra Opinia	25.8	38.2	5.3	8.6		9.2	6.6	4.7	1.3		12.4
2–3 October	IBRiS	24	34	6	10		8	9	3	1	5	10
1 October	IBRiS	23.2	35.6	6.2	9.3		7	8.1	2.5	0.5	7.6	12.4
30 Sept. – 1 Oct	Millward Brown	22	32	4	12		7	6	5	3	9	10
29 September	IBRiS	24.3	36	6.6	7.3		6.9	8.1	3	0.7	7.1	11.7
28–29 September	Estymator	26	42	6	7		5	5	5	1	3	16
24–25 September	PressMix	21	44	6	6		4	5	2	2	10	23
24 September	IBRiS	27.3	37.6	5	7.8		5	6	3.6	0.6	7	10.3
23–24 September	IPSOS	26	38	6	5		7	6	3	1	8	12
17–23 September	CBOS	30	34	5	5		7	6	4	1	8	4
22 September	IBRiS	25.5	36.9	5.8	8.3		4.7	7.3	3.6	0.9	7	11.4
17–21 September	Dobra Opinia	25.7	39.2	5.8	8.1		9.8	5.5	4.7	1.2	0	13.5
19–20 September	Millward Brown	22	33	6	8		5	6	7	2	11	11
16–20 September	ewybory.eu	25	38.4	5	12.8		6.7	4.5	4.2	0.9	2.5	13.4
18–19 September	IBRiS	22	39	5	8		4	6	–	–	16	17
13 September	IBRiS	21.8	36.4	5.2	8.8		6.1	5.7	3.0	1.3	13.1	14.6
9–13 September	ewybory.eu	24.2	37.1	5.5	15.3		5.5	4	6.3	0.1	2.1	12.9
10–11 September	IPSOS	24	35	5	6		9	4	4	–	13	11
4–9 September	TNS Poland	23	38	2	3		7	2	2	–	23	15
7 September	Millward Brown	25	38	5	9		6	7	5	–	?	13
3–7 September	GfK Polonia	31.1	43.3	3.9	5.5		6.8	2.7	3.2	0.1	3.4	12.2
4–6 September	Millward Brown	25	36	4	10		6	7	3	1	10	11
4–5 September	IBRiS	23	38	5	8		6	5	3	–	12	15
28 August	IBRiS	19	39.1	5.2	8.3		7	5.6	2.5	0.4	3.7	20.1
26–27 August	Estymator	26	43	7	8		4	4	2	–	6	17
17–24 August	CBOS	27	36	4	4		12	4	1	–	11	9
24 August	Millward Brown	27	37	4	11		6	5	4	–	5	10
17–23 August	ewybory.eu	21.2	46.9	5	12		4.5	2.9	2.8	0.1	4.6	25.7
20 August	IBRIS	19	40.4	5.4	9.5		4.7	6.5	2.2	–	12.3	21.4
15 August	IBRIS	24	36	6	8		6	6	0	1.1	14	14
14 August	Estymator	28	41	6	6		6	4	2	–	7	13
14 August	Arianda	25.4	36.1	3.9	3.8	0	13.5	4.1	2.9	–	10.1	10.7
7–12 August	TNS Poland	22	41	4	4		11	1	2	–	14	19
10 August	Millward Brown	26	35	3	8		12	5	3	–	9	9
6–10 August	GfK Polonia	29.9	42.3	4.1	4.2		9.8	2.3	3.8	–	3.6	12.4
8 August	TNS Poland	21.9	34.4	–	7.4		10.1	5.2	0	–	?	12.5
3–8 August	ewybory.eu	24.5	45.1	4.4	10.5		5.5	1.8	3.2	–	3.7	20.6
3 August	IBRiS	23	35	6	7		7	5	0	–	17	12
24–31 July	ewybory.eu	26.7	40.3	4	9.2		8.5	1.8	4.3	–	4.1	13.6
30 July	Estymator	29	43	5	4		9	4	2	–	3	14
29 July	GfK Polonia	30	47	3.7	1.1		10.5	1	2.2	–	4.5	17
25 July	Arianda	23	37	4	6	0	16	4	5	–	5	14
18 July	IBRiS	24	35	4	3	1	13	6	1	–	1	11
17 July	TNS Poland	23	37	3	3	0	14	1	1	1	2	14
16 July	Millward Brown	23	33	5	7		18	5	4	1	5	10
16 July	Estymator	28	43	5	5	0	10	4	2	–	?	15
8 July	CBOS	29	36	3	3	1	11	4	3	1	10	7
7 July	IBRiS	26	33	4	2	0	14	6	3	–	2	7
5 July	Millward Brown	25	34	5	6		16	6	4	–	1	9
2 July	TNS Poland	27	38	2	3		13	0	3	–	1	11
29 June	GfK Polonia	28.8	43.1	3.2	2.6	0.3	15.1	2.1	2	–	0.5	14.3
27 June	Estymator	25	36	6	4	1	20	–	2	–	?	11
23 June	Dobra Opinia	25.8	37.2	4	3.5	0.9	19.3	4.6	3.8	–	0.9	11.4
24 June	IBRiS	24	35.5	4.2	2.9	0.7	18.3	5.2	1.6	–	?	11.5
23 June	Millward Brown	23	33	5	4	1	19	8	3	–	3	10
21 June	IBRiS	26	28	5	4	0	21	5	2	–	?	2
17 June	TNS Poland	20	34	3	4	1	17	1	2	–	1	14
17 June	CBOS	25	31	4	4	1	19	4	2	–	8	6
11 June	Estymator	19	33	4	4	2	29	3	2	–	?	4
11 June	Millward Brown	19	30	3	5	3	24	7	4	–	1	6
9 June	TNS Poland	24	32	3	2	0	20	3	2	–	1	8
8 June	IBRiS	21	24	3	3	–	24.2	8	3	–	?	0.2
4 June	ewybory.eu	19.3	35.1	2.1	4.6	2.2	28	2.5	4.1	–	0.8	7.1
3 June	CBOS	31	33	1	4	1	14	3	2	–	0	2
1 June	Millward Brown	17	25	3	4	2	20	10	4	–	14	5
27–28 May	Estymator	20	36	4	5	1	25	4	1	–	1	11
May 24, 2015	Presidential elections - II Round	48.45	51.55	-	-	-	-	-	-	-	-	3.1
22–23 May	IBRiS	29	29	4	3	–	10	–	4	–	1	Tie
21 May	IBRiS	22.4	29.7	3.2	4.0	–	21.3	5.7	–	–	?	4.3
14–20 May	CBOS	34	35	5	4	2	4	–	5	–	1	1
14 May	Millward Brown	25	25	4	3	1	20	5	3	–	?	Tie
9–14 May	TNS Poland	28	35	4	8	2	–	–	4	–	16	7
14 May	Millward Brown	34	33	3	5	–	–	–	4	–	15+5	1
May 10, 2015	Presidential elections - I Round	33.8	34.8	1.6	2.4	1.4	20.8	-	3.3	-	1.9	1.0
8–9 May	IBRiS	37	35	5	5	1	-	-	3	-	14	2
28–29 April	TNS Poland	34	27	4	6	2	-	-	5	-	22	7
28 April	Millward Brown	35	31	3	6	2	-	-	7	-	16	4
24–25 April	IBRiS	37	32	5	4	–	-	-	5	-	17	5
16–22 April	CBOS	36	30	6	7	2	-	-	6	1	13	6
14–16 April	Estymator	40	34	8	7	2	-	-	4	-	5	6
11–16 April	TNS Poland	35	30	6	6	1	-	-	4	-	18	5
9–13 April	GfK Polonia	44.7	36.3	4.4	5.6	1.0	-	-	2.5	–	5.5	8.4
13 April	Millward Brown	35	31	5	7	3	-	-	8	–	11	4
April	IBRiS	36	31	6	8	3	-	-	4	–	12	5
7–8 April	TNS Poland	38	30	5	6	1	-	-	4	-	16	8
7 April	IBRiS	38.2	33.2	5.2	6.3	1.7	-	-	4.8	-	5.8	5
30 March	Millward Brown	35	35	5	6	3	-	-	5	–	11	Tie
27–28 March	IBRiS	36.3	30.2	7.0	6.8	1.8	-	-	5.4	–	12.5	6.1
16–18 March	Estymator	38	34	8	9	3	-	-	5	-	3	4
13–18 March	TNS Poland	30	32	5	8	2	-	-	2	-	21	2
11–18 March	CBOS	42	29	5	7	1	-	-	3	-	13	13
16 March	Millward Brown	32	34	4	11	4	-	-	4	-	11	2
12–16 March	GfK Polonia	46.1	34.6	6.7	4.6	0.4	-	-	1.9	-	5.7	11.5
13–14 March	IBRiS	34.5	31.3	7.6	8.3	0.8	-	-	2.4	-	15.1	3.2
10–11 March	TNS Poland	36	34	6	5	1	-	-	3	-	15	2
5–11 March	CBOS	46	27	5	6	1	-	-	4	-	11	19
27 February	IBRiS	37.0	32.8	7.3	7.4	1.5	-	-	3.3	-	10.7	4.2
13–18 February	Millward Brown	34	35	5	8	1	-	-	6	-	11	1
13–18 February	TNS Poland	33	27	8	9	1	-	-	-	-	21	6
15–17 February	Estymator	39	32	11	10	2	-	-	4	-	2	7
16 February	Millward Brown	31	30	6	10	4	-	-	5	-	14	1
12–16 February	GfK Polonia	38.9	38.0	8.9	6.5	1.3	-	-	1.7	-	4.7	0.9
5–11 February	CBOS	38	28	11	8	3	-	–	–	–	12	10
4–5 February	TNS Poland	34	32	9	7	2	-	-	1	-	15	2
30–31 January	IBRiS	34.2	32.9	7.6	8.4	1.6	-	-	3.5	-	11.8	1.3
16–21 January	TNS Poland	31	27	8	11	2	-	-	-	-	21	4
15–18 January	GfK Polonia	38.5	37.7	6.3	8.3	1.5	-	-	-	-	7.7	0.8
16–17 January	IBRiS	35.6	34.7	7.8	10.2	1	-	-	-	-	11.7	0.9
8–14 January	CBOS	40	29	7	6	0	-	-	-	-	18	11
12–13 January	TNS Poland	33	33	6	8	1	-	-	-	-	19	Tie
12 January	Millward Brown	34	34	9	9	0	-	-	-	-	14	Tie
2–3 January	IBRiS	33.9	32.0	6.8	5.9	1.9	-	-	-	-	19.5	1.9

==== 2014 ====
Dates of Polling	Polling Firm/Link	PO	PiS	SLD	PSL	KNP	TR	SP	PRZP	Others/Undecided	Lead
18–19 December	IBRiS	32.8	29.8	5.9	7.7	6.1	1.2	(PiS)	(PiS)	16.5	3
10–11 December	TNS Poland	31	34	5	8	5	3	(PiS)	(PiS)	14	3
4–11 December	CBOS	43	28	7	9	4	1	(PiS)	(PiS)	8	15
5–10 December	TNS Poland	34	29	9	9	3	2	(PiS)	(PiS)	14	5
4–7 December	GfK Polonia	38.2	40	7	7.7	1	1.5	1.7		2.9	1.8
5–6 December	IBRiS	33	30	8	8	5	–	(PiS)	(PiS)	16	3
20–23 November	GfK Polonia	38.2	35.9	6.6	8.1	3.9	2.3	1.6		3.4	2.3
21–22 November	IBRiS	36.3	34.1	7.1	7.6	5.6	1.0	(PiS)	(PiS)	8.3	2.2
18–21 November	Millward Brown	33	30	10	9	3	2	(PiS)	(PiS)	13	3
16 November	Local election results	26.3	26.9	8.8	23.9	3.9	1 (Note: Your Movement did not present lists in all regions in the local elections.)	(PiS)	(PiS)	9.2	0.6
6–16 November	CBOS	38	27	9	8	4	1	(PiS)	(PiS)	13	11
12–13 November	TNS Poland	32	28	7	5	5	2	(PiS)	(PiS)	21	4
7–13 November	TNS Poland	26	29	11	9	3	2	(PiS)	(PiS)	20	3
10–12 November	Estymator	38	35	8	8	7	1	(PiS)	(PiS)	3	3
7–8 November	IBRiS	33	30	11	8	4	1	(PiS)	(PiS)	13	3
5 November	TNS Poland	32	27	9	5	5	1	(PiS)	(PiS)	21	5
17–18 October	IBRiS	33	33	9	5	4	1	(PiS)	(PiS)	15	Tie
16–19 October	Millward Brown	34	30	11	6	4	2	(PiS)	(PiS)	13	4
9–15 October	CBOS	34	34	9	6	7	2	(PiS)	(PiS)	8	Tie
3–8 October	TNS Poland	28	27	14	9	3	2	(PiS)	(PiS)	17	1
2–6 October	GfK Polonia	37.6	37.8	8.4	7	3	1.1	1.5		3.6	0.2
3–4 October	IBRiS	34	32	10	6	4	1	(PiS)	(PiS)	13	2
2 October	TNS Poland	34	28	8	6	5	2	(PiS)	(PiS)	17	6
19–20 September	IBRiS	33	33	11	6	5	1	1	1	9	Tie
11–17 September	CBOS	38	33	6	7	6	2	(PiS)	(PiS)	8	5
5–9 September	TNS Poland	27	31	10	7	5	4	(PiS)	(PiS)	16	4
5–8 September	GfK Polonia	37.8	41.5	7.4	4.7	3.9	1.3	0.8		2.6	3.7
4–5 September	TNS Poland	34	28	9	5	5	2	(PiS)	(PiS)	17	6
2 September	Millward Brown	31	32	9	5	7	4	(PiS)	(PiS)	12	1
19–25 August	CBOS	26	32	9	6	7	4	(PiS)	(PiS)	16	6
22–23 August	IBRiS	25	33	12	5	7	3	2	1	12	8
8–14 August	TNS Poland	26	31	12	7	3	2	(PiS)	(PiS)	19	5
8–9 August	IBRiS	24	33	11	6	6	2	1	3	14	9
25–26 July	IBRiS	25	36	9	4	6	2	1	3	14	11
25 July	GfK Polonia	27.7	42.4	9.6	5.9	5.4	2.2	1.3	1.1	4.4	14.7
18 July	TNS Poland	23	35	8	4	5	2	2	2	19	12
10–13 July	Millward Brown	26	33	8	4	10	2	1	2	14	7
11–12 July	IBRiS	25	31	11	5	8	3	3	2	12	6
10 July	CBOS	29	24	8	6	6	2	1	2	22	5
27–28 June	IBRiS	24	32	10	5	11	2	3	2	11	8
23 June	TNS Poland	24	31	8	5	10	4	2	2	13	7
17 June	Millward Brown	25	32	10	4	8	4	0	1	16	7
13–14 June	IBRiS	28	32	9	7	5	2	3	2	12	4
6–11 June	TNS Poland	28	36	10	5	4	2	2	1	12	8
5–11 June	CBOS	32	24	5	6	5	3	1	1	23	8
30–31 May	IBRiS	26	30	11	5	6	2	3	2	15	4
27 May	IBRiS	28	30	11	7	7	2	2	3	10	2
25 May	European Parliament election	32.1	31.8	9.5	6.8	7.1	3.6	4	3.2	1.9	0.3
24–25 May	IBRiS	25	30	13	5	5	3	3	2	14	5
9–14 May	TNS Poland	25	32	9	6	3	5	1	2	17	7
7–14 May	CBOS	27	23	9	4	5	3	1	2	26	4
13 May	IBRiS	28	30	11	5	7	4	2	2	11	2
8–10 May	IBRiS	29	29	12	5	6	3	3	2	11	Tie
29 April	IBRiS	26	28	12	6	5	4	2	3	14	2
24–25 April	IBRiS	25	30	13	5	5	3	3	2	14	2
14 April	IBRiS	26	28	12	5	4	5	2	3	15	2
8 April	Millward Brown	31	29	8	7	6	7	–	–	12	2
4–9 April	TNS Poland	29	32	10	5	2	2	2	2	16	3
3–9 April	CBOS	28	21	7	5	5	1	1	3	29	7
2–3 April	TNS Poland	31	30	12	6	6	6	3	3	3	1
1 April	IBRiS	28	31	11	5	2	4	2	1	16	3
20–21 March	Estymator	36	33	12	5	2	4	2	5	1	3
18 March	IBRiS	27	29	11	5	2	4	2	1	19	5
6–12 March	CBOS	26	24	7	4	3	3	2	2	29	2
7–8 March	IBRiS	25	30	11	5	5	3	2	1	18	5
6–7 March	TNS Poland	26	31	8	5	3	5	2	3	17	5
4 March	IBRiS	25	31	12	6	2	6	2	2	14	6
18 February	IBRiS	23	30	12	4	3	5	3	2	18	7
6–12 February	CBOS	25	26	8	4	4	3	2	2	26	1
6–7 February	TNS Poland	26	29	10	3	4	8	3	3	14	3
4 February	IBRiS	24	32	12	5	2	4	1	4	16	8
24–26 January	Millward Brown	24	32	10	7	4	7	1	2	13	8
21 January	IBRiS	23	29	13	6	2	5	2	3	17	6
15–16 January	Estymator	33.5	31.6	13.9	8.2	1.9	3.3	1.7	5.4	0.5	1.9
9–15 January	CBOS	24	25	8	5	3	3	2	3	27	1
10–11 January	IBRiS	27	29	14	5	–	2	0	3	20	2
6 January	IBRiS	24	29	12	6	–	3	1	–	25	5

==== 2013 ====
Dates of Polling	Polling Firm/Link	PO	PiS	SLD	PSL	KNP	RP	SP	PRJG	Others/Undecided	Lead
17 December	IBRiS	23	30	15	6	–	3	2	–	21	7
16 December	IBRiS	23.8	31.1	14.5	5	–	4.6	3	4	14	7.3
13–16 December	TNS Poland	26	29	10	4	3	5	4	5	14	3
5–12 December	CBOS	23	23	10	6	2	3	2	–	31	Tie
6–11 December	TNS Poland	23	28	9	4	3	6	3	–	24	5
9–10 December	Estymator	28.2	31.5	13.4	7.3	3.9	5.4	3	6.6	0.7	3.3
9 December	Millward Brown	25	31	10	5	–	6	–	6	17	6
5–8 December	GfK Polonia	33.8	39.5	9.8	5.8	2.3	3.2	2.4	–	3.2	5.7
3 December	IBRiS	19	32	15	6	–	5	3	–	20	13
22–25 November	TNS Poland	28	28	7	7	–	8	–	–	22	Tie
22–23 November	IBRiS	19	29	15	6	4	5	3	–	19	10
20–21 November	TNS Poland	34	36	12	4	4	5	2	–	3	2
8–15 November	TNS Poland	22	31	12	5	2	5	3	–	20	9
7–14 November	CBOS	24	25	10	7	1	3	1	–	29	1
8–9 November	IBRiS	20	31	15	4	4	6	3	–	17	11
25–26 October	Millward Brown	27	35	9	–	5	7	–	–	17	8
22–24 October	TNS Poland	41	32	11	3	3	5	2	–	3	9
22 October	IBRiS	22	30	13	7	–	4	3	–	21	8
18–19 October	IBRiS	22	31	14	6	–	5	–	–	22	9
3–9 October	CBOS	22	28	8	6	4	4	2	–	26	6
8 October	IBRiS	24	30	14	6	–	4	2	–	20	6
20–21 September	IBRiS	24	30	13	5	–	5	–	–	23	6
17 September	IBRiS	22	32	13	5	–	6	4	–	18	10
13–15 September	Millward Brown	27	33	10	4	3	6	2	–	15	6
5–12 September	CBOS	25	23	10	6	2	5	0	–	29	2
10 September	Millward Brown	25	30	10	7	4	8	2	–	14	5
10 September	IBRiS	20	31	15	5	3	2	3	4 (Note: In this poll, the people surveyed were asked how they would vote in the hypothetical event of Jarosław Gowin launching his own party.)	17	11
7–10 September	TNS Poland	28	26	7	5	2	5	3	–	24	2
23–24 August	IBRiS	22	33	15	5	–	3	3	–	19	11
13 August	TNS Poland	32	43	12	5	2	3	1	–	2	11
1–12 August	CBOS	25	24	9	5	2	2	2	–	31	1
9 August	IBRiS	25.6	33.8	14.1	6.2	3	6	2.2	–	9.1	8.2
2–8 August	TNS Poland	25	29	10	5	3	5	4	–	19	4
6 August	IBRiS	24	35	15	5	–	3	3	–	15	11
23 July	IBRiS	26	32	15	5	–	3	4	–	15	6
19 July	IBRiS	24.7	30.4	14.3	5.1	0.7	4.9	3.3	–	16.6	5.7
12–15 July	TNS Poland	34	40	13	2	1	6	2	–	2	6
4–11 July	CBOS	24	26	7	5	2	3	1	–	32	2
5–10 July	TNS Poland	26	30	9	4	2	5	2	–	22	4
9 July	IBRiS	25	33	17	5	–	3	3	–	14	8
3 July	Millward Brown	26	35	10	5	–	6	–	–	18	9
26 June	IBRiS	27	32	16	7	–	3	5	–	10	5
21 June	IBRiS	26	31	15	6	–	6	–	–	16	5
12–13 June	TNS Poland	32	39	14	3	3	5	2	–	7	7
6–12 June	CBOS	23	27	9	6	2	3	2	–	23	4
11 June	IBRiS	26	32	15	4	–	4	5	–	14	6
4–11 June	CBOS	24	26	7	5	2	3	2	–	31	2
28–29 May	Millward Brown	26	30	16	5	5	10	–	–	8	4
28 May	IBRiS	27	30	14	4	–	6	3	–	16	3
24 May	IBRiS	27	32	14	6	2	6	3	–	10	5
11–16 May	TNS Poland	25	28	12	4	3	8	3	–	17	3
9–15 May	CBOS	23	26	9	6	2	4	2	–	28	3
10 May	IBRiS	26	28	13	7	3	5	3	3	12	2
7 May	IBRiS	31	30	13	5	–	6	3	–	12	1
26 April	IBRiS	30	31	13	6	–	3	4	–	13	1
23 April	IBRiS	28	29	12	6	–	6	5	–	14	1
12 April	IBRiS	29	29	13	6	3	4	3	–	13	Tie
4–10 April	CBOS	25	23	8	6	2	2	3	–	31	2
9 April	IBRiS	31	30	13	6	–	4	4	–	12	1
18 March	IBRiS	32	31	15	5	–	5	3	–	9	1
18 March	Millward Brown	28	28	11	6	4	10	1	–	12	Tie
7–13 March	CBOS	25	22	10	6	4	6	1	–	26	3
8 March	IBRiS	32	28	14	7	–	4	4	–	11	4
5 March	Millward Brown	32	31	9	6	–	7	1	–	14	1
5 March	IBRiS	32	30	14	5	–	6	4	–	9	2
22–26 February	TNS Poland	29	26	12	5	1	5	2	–	20	3
18 February	IBRiS	33	29	14	4	–	3	5	–	12	4
13–14 February	TNS Poland	35	34	15	3	3	6	3	–	1	1
8–11 February	TNS Poland	33	29	6	6	2	6	2	–	16	5
8–9 February	IBRiS	30	27	13	5	–	4	5	–	16	5
31 Jan – 6 Feb	CBOS	25	24	7	8	2	5	3	–	26	1
4 February	IBRiS	30	28	13	5	–	7	6	–	11	2
30 January	IBRiS	29	30	13	7	3	7	2	–	9	1
26–27 January	Millward Brown	30	25	13	6	–	11	2	–	13	5
22 January	IBRiS	31	29	11	8	–	4	2	–	15	2
11–14 January	TNS Poland	29	23	10	6	–	7	4	–	21	6
3–9 January	CBOS	31	22	8	6	2	4	3	–	24	9
8 January	IBRiS	29	31	13	7	–	4	2	–	14	2

==== 2012 ====
Dates of Polling	Polling Firm/Link	PO	PiS	SLD	PSL	KNP	RP	SP	Others/Undecided	Lead
14–19 December	TNS Poland	32	22	9	6	–	6	–	25	10
18 December	IBRiS	33	29	13	6	–	6	2	11	4
8–9 December	Millward Brown	33	28	8	6	–	8	–	17	5
6–9 December	TNS Poland	34	26	7	7	1	6	2	17	8
5–6 December	TNS Poland	36	31	14	6	–	8	2	3	5
30 Nov – 6 Dec	CBOS	32	20	8	8	2	5	3	22	12
4 December	IBRiS	29	28	13	7	–	4	3	16	1
29 November	TNS Poland	28	28	7	7	–	8	–	22	Tie
20 November	IBRiS	36	27	9	4	–	4	3	17	9
19 November	Millward Brown	37	26	11	6	–	9	–	11	11
8–17 November	CBOS	34	18	9	7	2	4	3	23	16
13 November	IBRiS	29.4	30.3	13.5	5	–	6.1	–	15.7	0.9
7–8 November	TNS Poland	42	30	10	4	1	8	1	4	12
6 November	IBRiS	31	30	11	6	–	7	5	10	1
31 October	Millward Brown	33	29	10	4	2	6	4	12	4
23 October	IBRiS	33	31	12	5	–	6	5	8	2
16 October	TNS Poland	34	23	8	5	1	6	3	20	3
5–12 October	TNS Poland	27	28	10	5	–	7	–	23	1
11 October	Millward Brown	27	30	12	5	–	6	5	15	3
4–10 October	CBOS	28	24	8	5	–	4	3	28	4
2 October	IBRiS	28	28	14	6	–	5	5	14	Tie
18 September	IBRiS	32	29	12	5	–	6	5	11	3
5–16 September	CBOS	31	23	8	5	1	4	3	25	8
7–10 September	TNS Poland	28	26	7	5	2	5	3	24	2
4 September	IBRiS	31	27	13	5	–	7	5	12	4
14–22 August	CBOS	36	22	8	6	2	5	2	19	14
21 August	IBRiS	30	29	13	5	–	6	4	13	1
2–5 August	TNS Poland	29	24	7	4	2	7	3	24	5
31 July	IBRiS	32	26	12	6	–	6	4	24	6
17 July	IBRiS	34	25	13	6	–	6	4	12	9
5–12 July	CBOS	32	25	9	4	–	5	3	22	7
3 July	IBRiS	33	25	14	6	–	5	5	12	8
14–20 June	CBOS	32	20	9	6	1	3	3	26	12
19 June	IBRiS	33	23	14	7	–	8	4	11	10
14–17 June	TNS Poland	30	23	8	6	1	9	1	22	7
5 June	IBRiS	29	28	11	6	–	7	5	14	1
10–16 May	CBOS	27	21	12	7	2	7	3	21	6
10–13 May	TNS Poland	28	25	7	3	1	10	2	24	3
9–10 May	TNS Poland	34	34	12	5	–	9	3	3	Tie
8 May	IBRiS	31	25	12	4	–	9	7	12	6
13–18 April	TNS Poland	30	25	7	3	2	9	4	20	5
12–18 April	CBOS	29	22	9	5	3	6	4	22	7
17 April	IBRiS	30	27	12	5	–	10	5	11	3
3 April	IBRiS	27	25	13	5	–	12	6	2	2
20 March	IBRiS	31	26	11	9	–	10	4	9	5
16 March	Millward Brown	29	26	11	4	3	14	1	12	3
8–14 March	CBOS	29	23	8	8	2	8	3	19	6
6 March	IBRiS	32	26	11	8	–	11	5	7	6
1–4 March	TNS Poland	29	22	9	5	1	12	2	20	7
8–9 February	Millward Brown	27	22	10	6	2	17	5	11	5
3–9 February	CBOS	33	19	8	7	2	9	3	19	14
7 February	IBRiS	35	21	12	8	–	11	3	10	14
2–6 February	TNS Poland	28	26	9	5	1	10	2	19	2
27 January	Millward Brown	33	22	8	9	–	13	2	13	11
24 January	IBRiS	34	22	13	7	–	13	4	7	12
19–23 January	TNS Poland	37	22	6	4	1	8	1	21	15
5–11 January	CBOS	40	18	4	7	2	8	2	19	22
10 January	IBRiS	36	23	11	7	2	9	4	8	13

==== 2011 ====
Dates of Polling	Polling Firm/Link	PO	PiS	SLD	PSL	KNP	RP	SP	Others/Undecided	Lead
20 December	TNS Poland	38	23	10	7	–	11	11		15
8–11 December	TNS Poland	38	27	6	7	–	8	2	12	11
1–8 December	CBOS	43	21	5	7	1	6	2	15	22
1–6 December	IBRiS	37	23	12	7	–	10	–	11	14
1–4 December	TNS Poland	36	19	6	6	1	10	2	20	17
30 Nov – 1 Dec	TNS Poland	43	23	9	5	–	10	2	10	20
30 November	Millward Brown	37	25	8	7	–	9	3	11	12
22 November	IBRiS	42	24	8	7	–	11	–	8	18
17–20 November	TNS Poland	34	24	9	5	1	8	3	16	10
4–13 November	CBOS	42	21	7	7	1	9	–	13	21
4–8 November	TNS Poland	42	22	7	5	–	7	–	17	20
5–7 November	IBRiS	39	26	7	7	–	11	–	10	13
4–5 November	Millward Brown	37	21	5	6	–	10	9 (Note: In this poll, the people surveyed were asked how they would vote in the hypothetical event of Zbigniew Ziobro launching his own party.)	12	16
2–3 November	TNS Poland	44	26	8	7	–	10	–	5	18
25 October	IBRiS	38	29	8	7	–	13	–	5	9
23 October	Millward Brown	39	27	7	8	2	12	–	5	12
13–16 October	TNS Poland	45	25	8	6	1	12	–	3	20
14 October	IBRiS	38.0	28.6	4.5	5.6	2.4	12.5	–	8.4	9.4
October 9, 2011	Election results	39.2	29.9	8.2	8.4	1.1	10.0	-	3.2	9.3
