= Lidia Staroń =

Polish politician (born 1960)

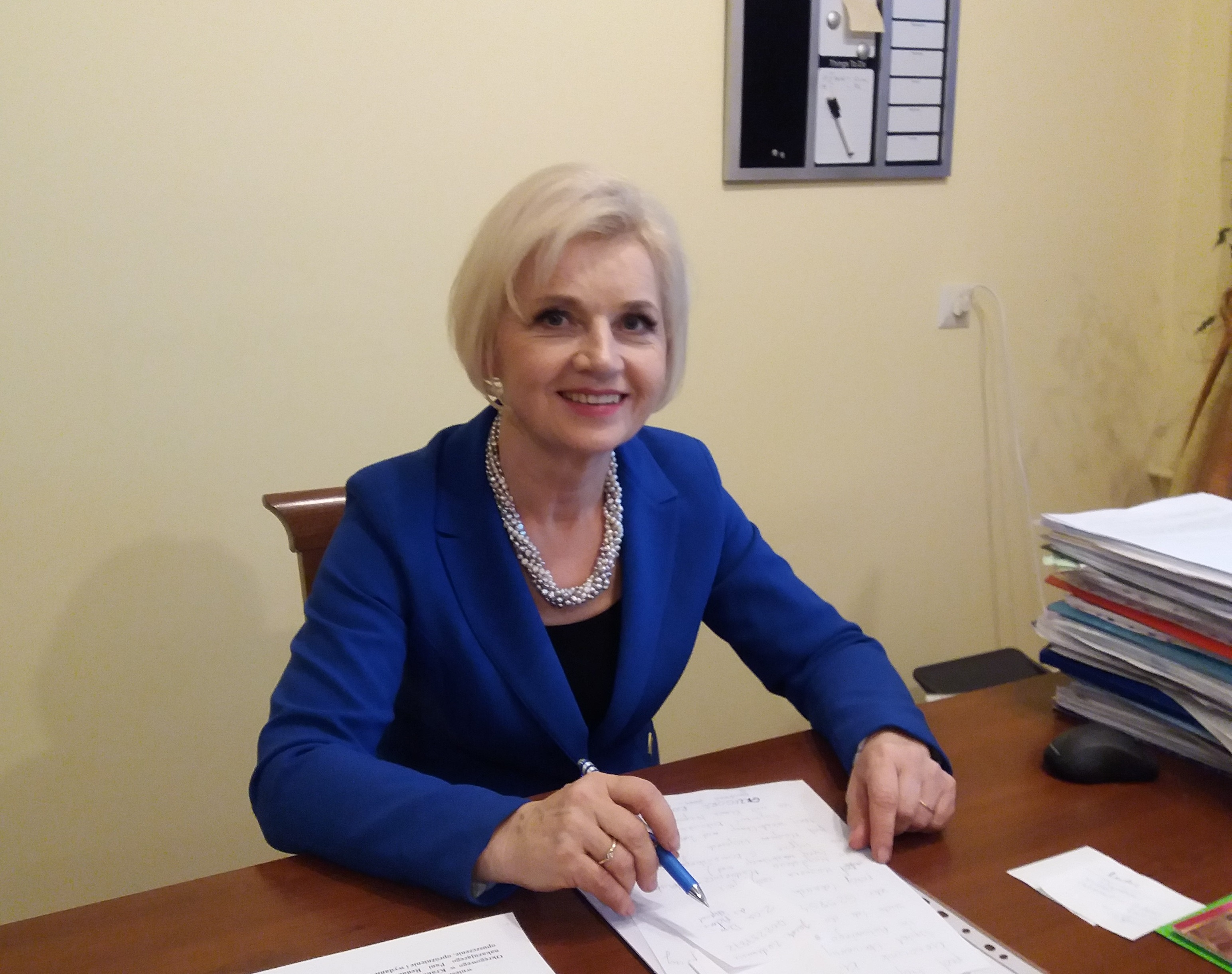

Member of the Sejm
- In office 25 September 2005 – 12 November 2015
- Constituency: 35 – Olsztyn

Member of the Senate
- In office 12 November 2015 – 12 November 2023
- Constituency: 86-Olsztyn

Personal details
- Born: 7 June 1960 (age 65)
- Party: Civic Platform (2005-2015); Independent (2015-present)

Lidia Ewa Staroń, née Kwiatkowska (born 7 June 1960 in Morąg) is a Polish politician. She was elected to the Sejm on 25 September 2005, getting 12,188 votes in 35 Olsztyn district as a candidate from the Civic Platform list. She left Civic Platform in 2015 and was an independent candidate for Senator in 2015 Parliamentary elections. She was elected Senator with 63,870 votes.

== See also ==
- Members of Polish Sejm 2005-2007
