= Wanda Nowicka =

Polish activist and politician (born 1956)

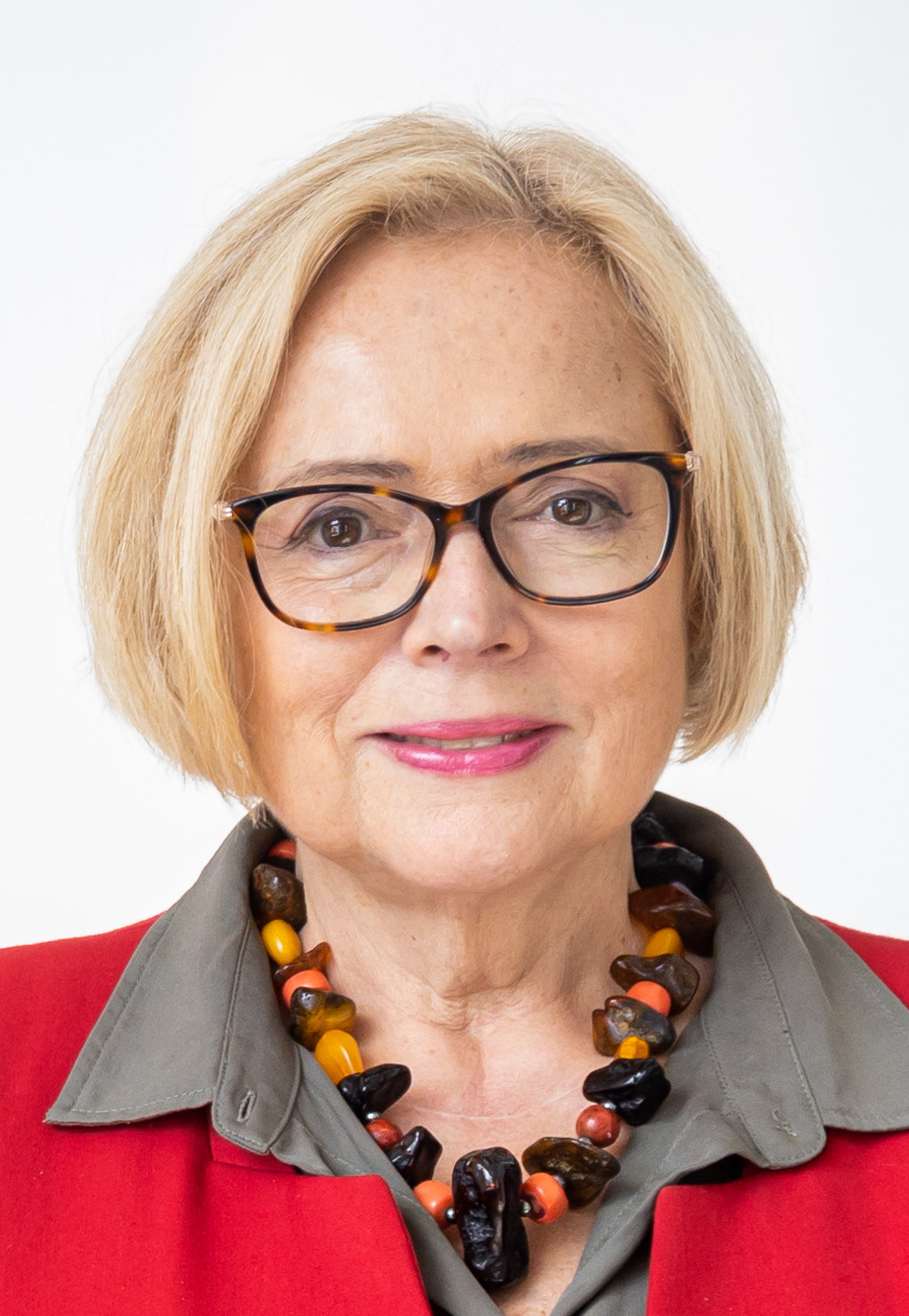
- Nowicka in 2022

Member of the Sejm
- Incumbent
- Assumed office 12 November 2019
- Constituency: No. 29 (Katowice)
- In office 8 November 2011 – 11 November 2015
- Constituency: No. 19 (Warsaw I)

Deputy Marshal of the Sejm
- In office 8 November 2011 – 11 November 2015

Personal details
- Born: Wanda Hanna Nowicka; 21 November 1956 (age 69) Lublin, Poland
- Party: Labour Union (1997–2001); Democratic Left Alliance (2001–2011, 2015–2019); Palikot's Movement / Your Movement (2011–2013); New Left (2019–present)

Wanda Hanna Nowicka (born 21 November 1956) is a Polish social activist and politician, member of the Sejm since 2019 and previously between 2011 and 2015. She served as the Deputy Marshal of the Sejm from 8 November 2011 to 11 November 2015.

Born in Lublin, she attended the University of Warsaw, graduating with a degree in classical philology, and worked as a teacher of Latin and English from 1985 to 1993. In 1990, Nowicka co-founded Neutrum, the Association for State Neutrality, an organization focused on the separation of church and state in Polish public life. She was also one of the founders of the Federation for Women and Family Planning in 1991, a non-governmental organization which is the alliance of Neutrum and four other organizations. She led the federation as its president for 20 years, from 1991 until 2011 when she resigned having got elected to Sejm. In the 9th term of Sejm she is a Chair of the Parliamentary Committee on National and Ethnic Minorities. She is also a founder and a Chair of the Parliamentary Group for women's rights.

== Education and teaching activities ==
She graduated in classical philology at the University of Warsaw. In 1985–1993 she worked as a teacher of Latin, Greek and English in high schools in Warsaw. In 2007–2008, she taught at the University of Rutgers in New Jersey, USA at the Faculty of Women's Affairs and Gender Studies on Reproductive Rights Activism with Focus on Central and Eastern Europe. In 2016–2017 she lectured Gender Studies at the Institute of Applied Social Sciences (University of Warsaw and Polish Academy of Science) In 2016–18 she studied bioethics at the University of Warsaw and philosophy at the Sorbonne in Paris

== Political career ==
Politically, Nowicka has allied herself with various parties, but has remained unaffiliated outside of briefly joining the Solidarity movement in 1980 and 1981. After 1989, she became involved in politics, cooperating with left-wing groups, but remaining independent. Several times she unsuccessfully stood in various parliamentary elections. In 1991, she ran for the Sejm from the list of Labour Solidarity, in 1997 she ran for Senator's seat on behalf of the Labour Union with 190,000 votes. In 1998–2002, she was elected to the first Masovian Regional Assembly with SLD on the recommendation of the Polish Socialist Party (PPS). In the 2011 parliamentary elections, she allied herself with Palikot's Movement, and she won a parliamentary seat, gaining 7065 votes. On 8 November 2011 she was elected Deputy Speaker of the Sejm for the 7th term. In February 2013 she split with the Palikot's Movement and remained independent member of the Sejm till the end term. She ran with the Europa Plus coalition to the European Parliament in 2014 in Warsaw district, and she received 7479 votes (second result), however, Europa Plus failed to gain any seats in the elections. On 21 February 2015 she announced her participation in the presidential election on behalf of the Polish Labour Party. Her candidacy was also supported by four political parties: the Polish Left, the Social Democracy of Poland, Polish Socialist Party and Union of the Left. She collected 91,000 out of 100,000 signatures required to be registered.

In 2015 Nowicka ran to Sejm with the United Left coalition in Masovian district. She received 20,503 votes, which did not qualify her for a seat, because the United Left did not pass the 8% threshold required for the coalition of parties.

In the 2019 she unsuccessfully ran to the European Parliament in Kujawy-Pomerania district with the Spring (Wiosna) party, newly formed by Robert Biedroń. She received 21,993 votes.

In 2019 parliamentary elections, running from the first place on the list of the Left alliance in Silesia (29th district), she received 25,767 votes, achieving a third place in the constituency and obtaining a seat as a 9th-term MP. In the Sejm, she was elected Chair of the Committee on National and Ethnic Minorities. She founded and has been elected as a Chair of the Parliamentary Group on Women's Rights.

== Activism ==
Nowicka was a cofounding member of Polish Committee of NGOs – Beijing 1995 which organized active participation of Polish activists in the famous United Nations conference known as Fourth World Conference on Women in Beijing (FWCW). The activities included the presentation of NGOs' report on the situation of women in Poland. At this UN conference Nowicka made a well-known Statement of Non-Region on behalf of women from Central and Eastern Europe. In 1999 Nowicka co-founded and was the first coordinator of ASTRA (Central and Eastern European Women's Network for Sexual and Reproductive Health and Rights). From 1995 to 2002 she served as an expert of the World Health Organization and a member of its advisory body called Gender Advisory Panel. Wanda Nowicka has been also a member of the Congress of Polish Women and board member of the association Congress of Women which is the operational body of this movement. She spoke on women/human rights on numerous occasions at international forums (UN, EU, Harvard University, Columbia University, New School, CUNY, University of California). She wrote numerous reports to the UN and the European Union on violations of human rights, including women's rights.

In 2003, Nowicka invited Women on Waves to Poland. Their ship, the Langenort, arrived for two weeks to Władysławowo at the Polish coast to organize together with Polish women's activists, actions to rise awaress about repressiveness of the anti-abortion law in Poland and to provide early abortions in extraterritorial waters. These actions were violently attacked by extreme right nationalist groups such as the All-Poland Youth and the League of Polish Families, who seriously intimidated women in order to stop them from boarding the ship.

== Private life ==
Daughter of Kazimierz Nowicki, former prisoner of German Nazi concentration camps Auschwitz and Buchenwald, and Irena Witkowska. Her stepfather was Kazimierz Albin, the former prisoner of Auschwitz. Her husband was Światoslaw Florian Nowicki, with whom she has three sons: Florian, Michał and Tymoteusz. Florian is a historian and a former politician of the Polish Labour Party; Michał is a sociologist and communist activist; Tymoteusz is a two-time world kickboxing champion.

She declares her knowledge of classical languages (Latin, Greek) and English, Russian and French, as well as the ability to communicate in German and Italian.

== Decorations and distinctions ==
Wanda Nowicka became Honorary Citizen of Spartanburg, South Carolina, USA in 1992. In 1994 she was a laureate of the Polish edition of the Woman of Europe competition. In 2000, she received the Rainbow Laurel award. In 2005, she received a £100,000 award from the Sigrid Rausing Foundation for the ASTRA network for outstanding leadership (the award was used to make the film Breaking Silence). In 2008, she won the University-In-Exile Award from New School for Social Research in New York, in recognition of her contribution to the struggle for women's rights in Poland and internationally. For active support of international cooperation and chairing the Polish-Greek parliamentary group, the Government of the Hellenic Republic awarded Wanda Nowicka the Order of Honor of the second class at the rank of Grand Commander.

== List of publications ==
- 1994 Nowicka, W. "Two Steps Back: Poland’s New Abortion Law". Journal of Women’s History 5 (3): 151–55. Johns Hopkins University Press.
- 1995 Coliver, S., and Nowicka W.,. "Poland". In The Right to Know: Human Rights and Access to Reproductive Health Information. University of Pennsylvania Press. pp. 268–284.
- 1996 Nowicka, W. "The effects of the anti-abortion law". EntreNous, December 1996, Copenhagen.
- 1996 Nowicka, W. "Roman Catholic fundamentalism against women’s reproductive rights in Poland". Reproductive Health Matters, 4(8):21–29.
- 1996 Nowicka, W. "Beijing '95 – A Chance That Could be Missed, in Voices of Women, Moving Forward with Dignity and Wholeness". The Fetzer Institute, Kalamazoo.
- 1996 Nowicka, W. "More Restrictive in Life than on Paper". Conscience, 17(2) (Summer), Washington.
- 1997 Nowicka, W. “Ban on Abortion. Why?” and "Foundation of the Law in Ana’s Land". In Sisterhood in Eastern Europe, ed. Tanya Renne. Westview Press: Division of HarperCollins Publishers.
- 1998 Nowicka, W. "Report to UN Committee on Economic, Social and Cultural Rights" (Situation of Women, esp. Reproductive Health and Rights). Federation for Women and Family Planning, Warsaw.
- 1998 Nowicka, W. “Factors Affecting Women’s Health in Eastern and Central Europe with particular emphasis on Infectious Diseases, Mental, Environmental and Reproductive Health". Paper for Expert Meeting on Women and Health, Mainstreaming the Gender Perspective into Health Sector, Tunis.
- 1998 Nowicka, W. “Mainstreaming the Gender Perspective into the Health Sector". ENTRE NOUS, WHO, Copenhagen, Winter 1998, No 40-41.
- 1999 Nowicka, W. "Shadow Report on Gender Discrimination for the UN Human Rights Committee". Federation for Women and Family Planning, Warsaw.
- 1999 Nowicka, W. "Advocating and Monitoring the Implementation of the ICPD Programme of Action in Poland". Development 42(1): 84–85.
- 1999 Nowicka, W. "Advocating and monitoring the implementation of the ICPD Programme of Action in Poland: the benefits of NGO reporting to the UN Committee on Economic, Social and Cultural Rights". Medical Law Journal 18(2–3):295–303.
- 2000 Nowicka, W., ed. "The Anti-abortion Law in Poland: Its Functioning, Social Effects and Behaviours Report". Warsaw, Federation for Women and Family Planning.
- 2000 Nowicka, W., and E. Zielińska. 2000. "Medical Community’s Perspectives on Abortion". In Report of the Federation 2000, 1–34. Strona główna.
- 2001 Nowicka, W. "Struggles for and against Legal Abortion in Poland". In Advocating for Abortion Access, edited by B. Klugman, and D. Budlender, 226–27. Johannesburg: Women's Health Project.
- 2001 Nowicka, W., and F. Girard. "Clear and Compelling Evidence: The Polish Tribunal on Abortion Rights". Reproductive Health Matters 10 (19): 22–30.
- 2002 Nowicka, W. "Shadow Report to UN Committee on Economic, Social and Cultural Rights". Federation for Women and Family Planning, Warsaw.
- 2003 Nowicka, W. "Solidarity over Borders". Report about Women on Waves in Poland, Federation for Women and Family Planning, Warsaw [in Polish] [Solidarność kobiet ponad granicami, Kronika wydarzeń Władysławowo 21 czerwca-4 lipca 2003].
- 2004 Nowicka, W. "Shadow Report on Gender Discrimination in the area of Sexual and Reproductive Health and Rights". Prepared for the UN Human Rights Committee.
- 2004 Nowicka, W. "Poland – The Struggle for Abortion Rights in Poland". In SexPolitics: Reports from the Front Lines, edited by Richard Parker, Rosalind Petchesky and Robert Sember. Publisher: Sexuality Policy Watch. pp. 167–196.
- 2007 Nowicka, W. "Prawa Reprodukcyjne w Polsce [Reproductive Rights in Poland]". in Czarna Księga Kobiet WAB, Warsaw.
- 2007 Nowicka, W, and M. Pochec. "Shadow Report on Women in Poland". Prepared for the UN Committee on Elimination of All Forms of Discrimination against Women
- 2008 Nowicka, W., (ed.) "Reproductive Rights in Poland, Report", Federation for Women and Family Planning, Warsaw.
- 2008 "The Anti-Abortion Act in Poland – The Legal and Actual State". In Reproductive Rights in Poland: The Effects of the Anti-Abortion Law in Poland, Report, Nowicka W. (ed.) 17–44. Warsaw: Federation for Women and Family Planning.
- 2011 Nowicka W., Polskie zmagania o aborcję w Drogi Równości (red B. Maciejewska, K.Kądziela, Z.Dąbrowska), Fundacja Przestrzenie Dialogu (Gdańsk 2011).
- 2011 Nowicka, W. "Sexual and Reproductive Rights and the Human Rights Agenda: Controversial and Contested". Reproductive Health Matters 19 (38): 119–28.
- 2011 Nowicka W., Odzyskać ciało, odzyskać godność w A jak hipokryzja (red. Claudia Snochowska-Gonzalez), Wyd. O Matko! (Warszawa 2011).
- 2018 Nowicka, W. Naruszenie praw reprodukcyjnych jako forma tortur w Prawo i Medycyna, Nr 4/2017 pp. 148–168.
- 2019 Wanda Nowicka & Anna C. Zielinska, Entre l’idéologie et l’économie : les politiques de natalité en Europe Centrale in Mouvements des idées et des luttes (Oct. 2019) http://mouvements.info/entre-lideologie-et-leconomie-les-politiques-de-natalite-en-europe-centrale/
- 2019 Nowicka, W. Les droits des femmes à l’épreuve du Sacré en Pologne in L’Idée Libre, Revue fondée en 1911, La Loi et le Sacré (Dec. 2019), ed. Wafa Tamzini.
- 2019 Nowicka, W. Regulska J. Book Chapter “Repressive Policies and Women's Reproductive Choices in Poland: The Case of State Violence Against Women" in Women's Journey to Empowerment in the 21st Century (eds. Zaleski K., Enrile. A., Weiss E.L., and Wang X., Oxford University Press. (to be out in November)
