= Tomasz Głogowski =

Polish politician (born 1974)

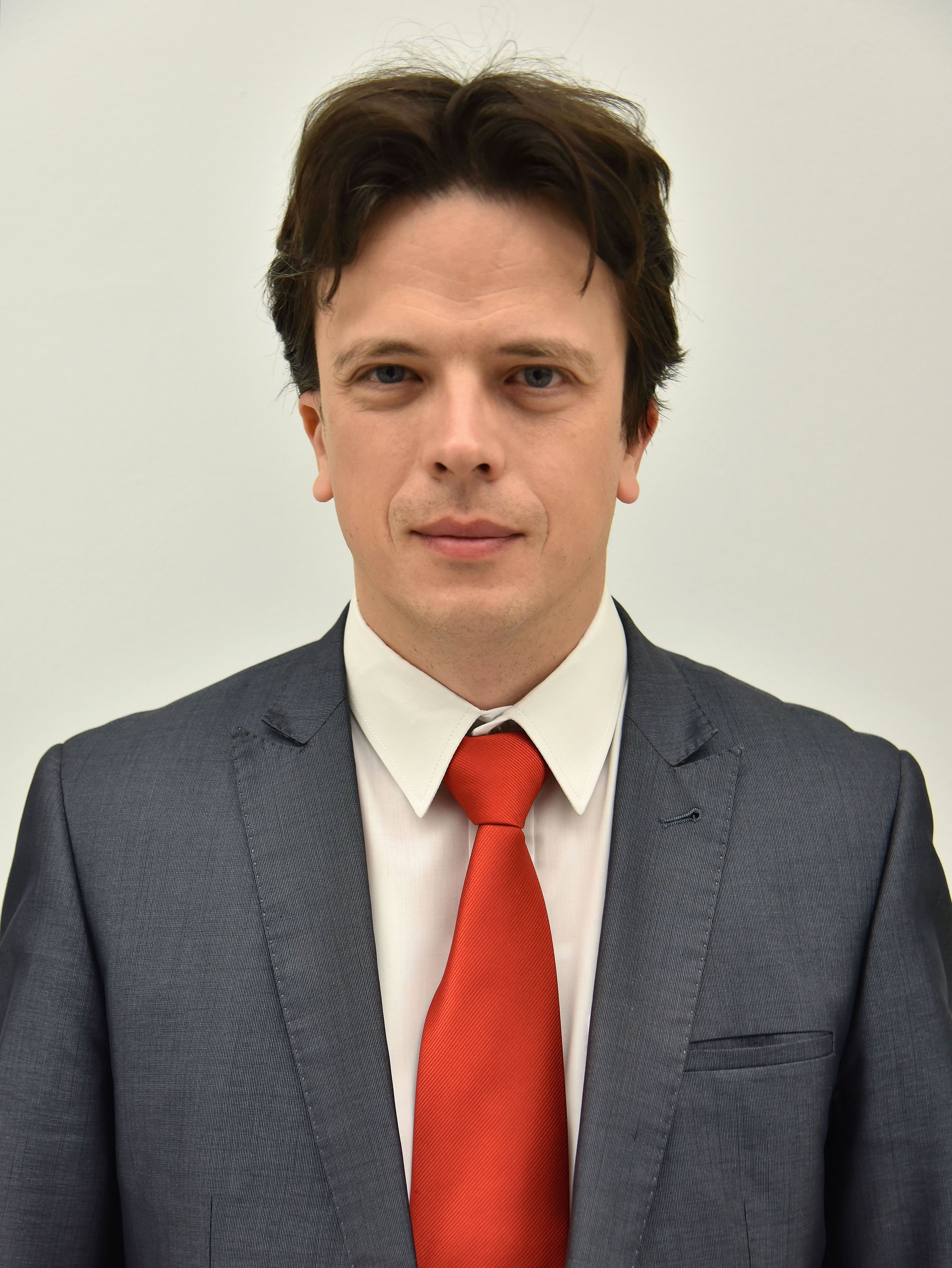

Member of the Sejm
- Incumbent
- Assumed office 25 September 2005

Personal details
- Born: Tomasz Marian Głogowski; 30 December 1974 (age 50); Tarnowskie Góry, Poland
- Political party: Civic Platform

Tomasz Marian Głogowski (born 30 December 1974 in Tarnowskie Góry) is a Polish politician, serving as a member of the Sejm since 2005, representing Constituency no. 29. He is a member of the Civic Platform party.
