= Waldemar Sługocki =

Member of the Polish Parliament of the 9th term

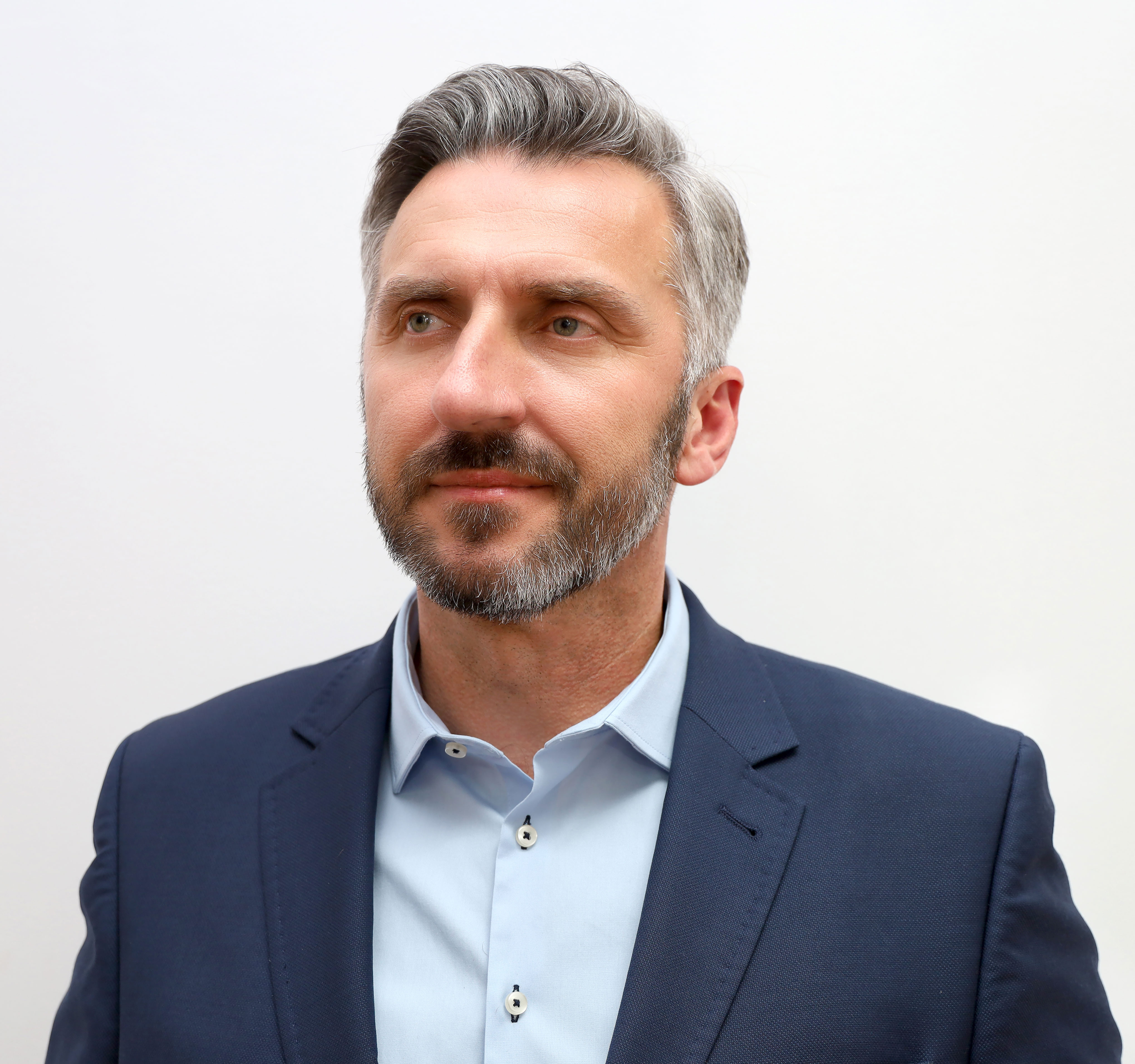

Member of the Sejm
- Incumbent
- Assumed office 12 November 2019
- In office 8 November 2011 – 11 November 2015

Member of the Senate
- In office 12 November 2015 – 12 November 2019

Deputy Minister of Infrastructure and Development
- In office 7 January 2015 – 16 November 2015

Deputy Minister of Economic Development and Technology
- In office 19 December 2023 – 23 July 2024

Personal details
- Born: Waldemar Jan Sługocki; 9 September 1971 (age 54) Sulechów, Poland
- Party: Civic Platform
- Education: Adam Mickiewicz University in Poznań

Waldemar Jan Sługocki, ['waldɛmar jan swuɡɔt͡ski]; born 9 September 1971 in [Sulechów]. Polish political scientist, government official and politician, from 2010 to 2011 undersecretary of state in the Ministry of Regional Development., in 2015 secretary of state in the Ministry of Infrastructure and Development, deputy to the Sejm 2011–2015., and the Senate2015-2019. President of the Civic Platform in the Lubusz Voivodeship since 2017. In the 2019 Polish parliamentary election he was re-elected deputy to the Sejm, running for the Civic Platform and receiving 29,580 votes He became vice-chairman of the Committee for Local Self-Government and Regional Policy, a member of the Committee for Economy and Development and chairman of the Lubusz Parliamentary Group. In 2023 Polish parliamentary election Waldemar Sługocki was re-elected deputy to the Sejm, running for the Civic Platform and receiving 25,037 votes. He was elected vice-chairman of the Committee on Local Self-Government and Regional Development. On 19 December 2023, he was appointed Secretary of State at the Ministry of Development and Technology
