= Zbigniew Stonoga =

Polish businessman, activist, philanthropist and whistleblower (born 1974)

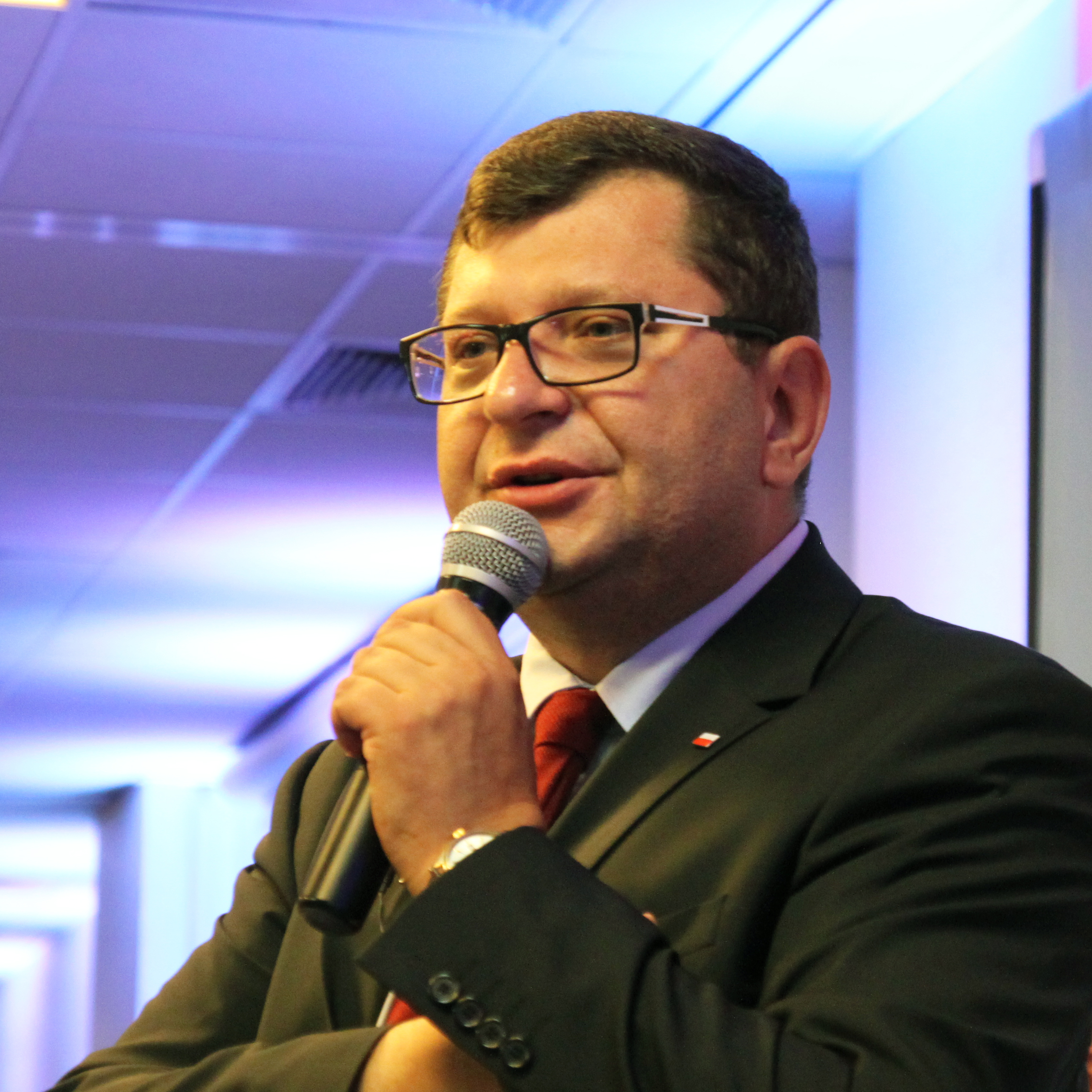
- Born: 17 October 1974 (age 52); Ozimek
- Occupation: Entrepreneur
- Years active: 1999-present
- Known for: Political activism, whistleblowing, philanthropy, videoblogging
- Political party: KNP (2014); SPP (2015)
- Opponents: Zbigniew Ziobro; Law and Justice; Jarosław Kaczyński
- Criminal charge: Fraud

Zbigniew Stonoga (pronounced [ˈzbiɡɲɛf stɔˈnɔɡa]; born 17 October 1974 in Ozimek) is a Polish entrepreneur, businessman, activist and philanthropist who gained notoriety as a whistleblower for the publication of the investigation files concerning the Polish bugging scandal (2014–2015), known as Waitergate. Founder of the short-lived Stonoga Polish Party (also known in English as The Centipede Party, since Stonoga translates as "centipede"). Founder of Gazeta Stonoga.

== Biography ==
=== Academic background ===
After graduating from an electrotechnical vocational school, he started higher education which he did not complete.

=== Political career ===
In 2015 he ran in Polish parliamentary elections in which his party, Stonoga Party Poland, scored 0.4% (40 000 voters). After the results were announced, furious Stonoga uploaded a video to the internet in which he expressed his frustration with those who did not vote for him or for the Coalition for the Renewal of the Republic - Liberty and Hope.

His language is vulgar and direct, attracting the attention of young audiences.

His recordings of private conversations between Polish politicians have led to a few resignations.

== Lawsuits ==
In the 2000s, Stonoga was named in a total of 89 criminal lawsuits.

In 2004, he was sentenced to 3.5 years' imprisonment for financial irregularities. In 2005, his sentence was quashed.

By 2015, he was named in 61 criminal cases related mostly to financial fraud and insulting public servants; he was sentenced to a year in prison for fraud on a private car sale.

On 9 May 2017, Stonoga was imprisoned at the Warszawa-Bialoleka correctional center for one year on charges of committing a large-scale financial fraud; the sentence was later shortened by 3 weeks.
