= Sławomir Rybicki =

Polish politician (born 1960)

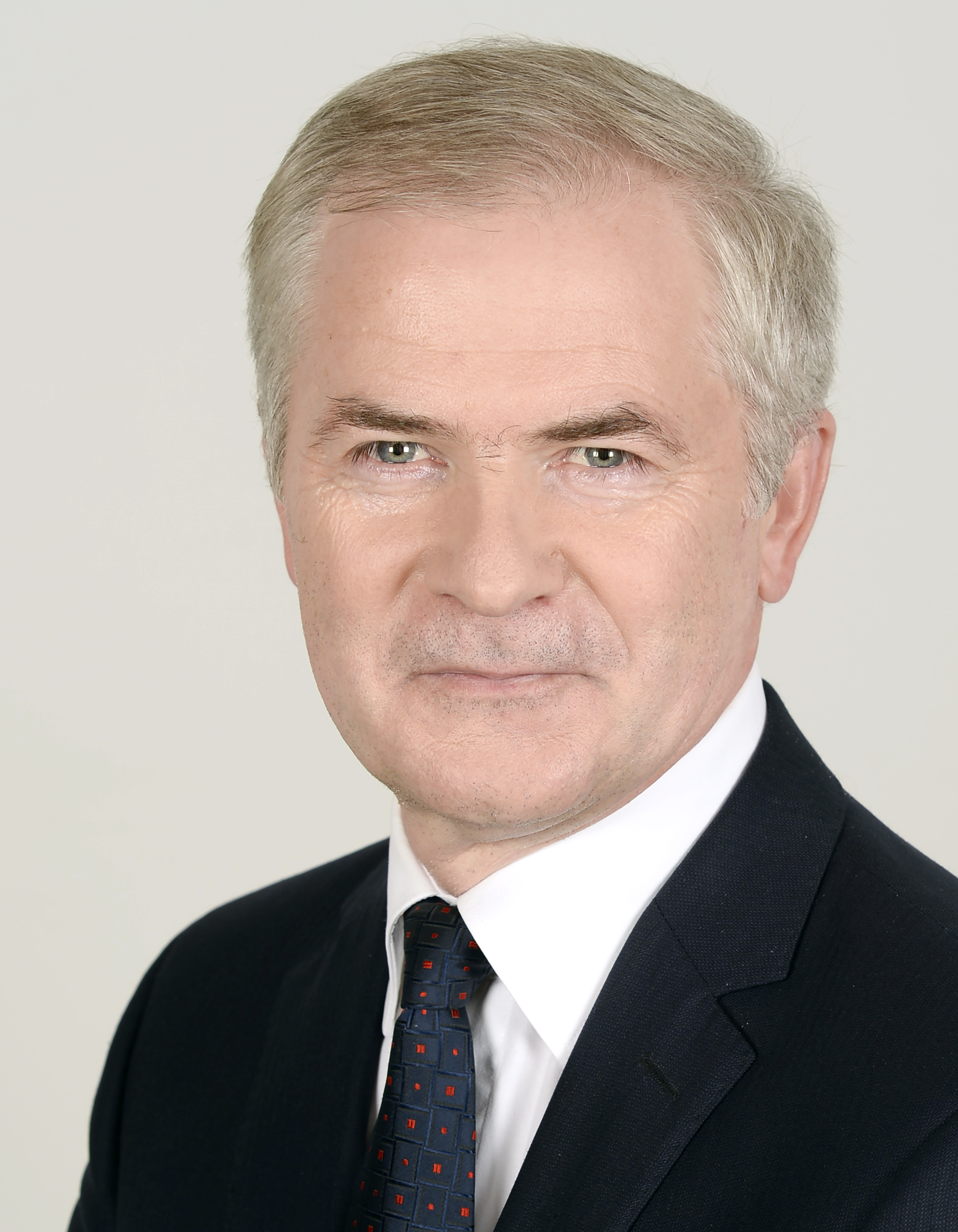

Member of the Sejm
- Incumbent
- Assumed office 19 October 2001
- Constituency: 35 – Olsztyn

Personal details
- Born: 1960 (age 65–66)
- Party: Civic Platform

Sławomir Piotr Rybicki (born 23 June 1960 in Gdańsk) is a Polish politician. He was elected to the Sejm on 25 September 2005, getting 12557 votes in 35 Olsztyn district as a candidate from the Civic Platform list.

He was also a member of Sejm 2001-2005.

== See also ==
- Members of Polish Sejm 2005-2007
