= Waldemar Kraska =

Polish politician (born 1963)

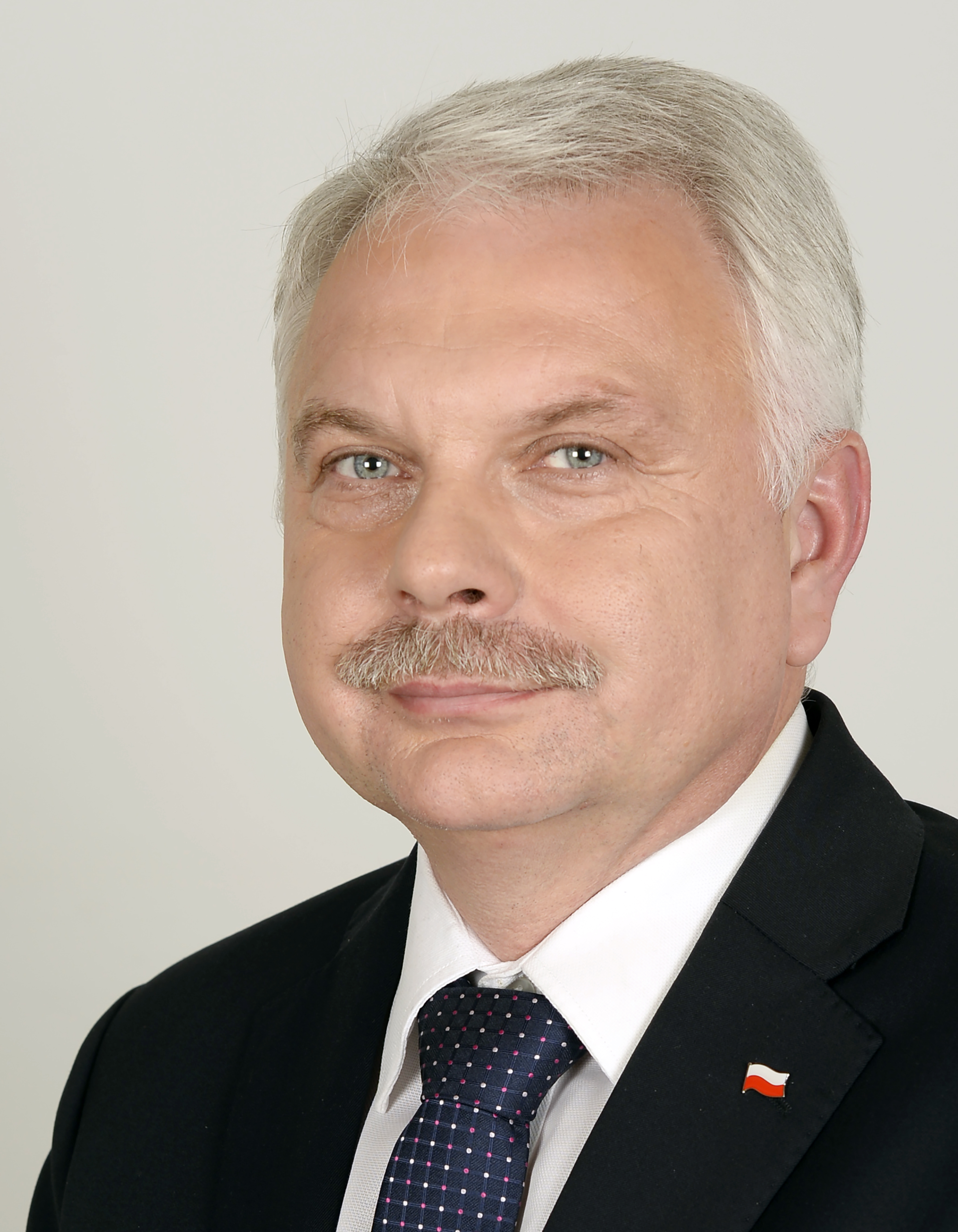
Waldemar Kraska

Waldemar Jerzy Kraska (born 4 September 1963) is a Polish politician. He was elected to the Senate of Poland (10th term) representing the constituency of Siedlce. He is a member of the Law and Justice party.
