= Danuta Hojarska =

Polish politician (born 1960)

member of Sejm 2005-2007
- In office 25 September 2005 – ?

Personal details
- Born: 2 January 1960 (age 66) Malbork, Poland
- Party: Samoobrona

Danuta Hojarska, née Gąsiorek (born 2 January 1960 in Malbork) is a Polish politician. She was elected to the Sejm on 25 September 2005, getting 10155 votes in 25 Gdańsk district as a candidate from Samoobrona Rzeczpospolitej Polskiej list.

She was also a member of Sejm 2001-2005.

== See also ==
- Members of Polish Sejm 2005-2007
