= Sejm Constituency no. 29 =

Polish parliamentary constituency

- Constituency
- Location within Poland.
- Counties: Bytom, Gliwice, Gliwice County, Tarnowskie Góry County, Zabrze
- Voivodeship: Silesian
- Electorate: 550,109 (2023)

Current constituency
- Member: 9

Sejm Constituency no. 29 (Polish: Okręg wyborczy nr 29 do Sejmu) is a Polish parliamentary constituency for the Sejm. It is located in the Silesian Voivodeship. The constituency covers an area of land counties of Gliwice, Tarnowskie Góry and city counties of Bytom, Gliwice and Zabrze.

== List of members ==
Members of the 10th Sejm (2023–2027)
Member	Parliamentary group
Tomasz Głogowski	Civic Coalition
Marta Golbik	Civic Coalition
Marek Gzik	Civic Coalition
Krystyna Szumilas	Civic Coalition
Bożena Borys-Szopa	Law and Justice
Wojciech Szarama	Law and Justice
Jarosław Wieczorek	Law and Justice
Wanda Nowicka	The Left
Piotr Strach	Poland 2050

== Elections ==
=== 2023 ===
2023 parliamentary election
Party	Votes	%	Seats
Civic Coalition	139,711	36.06	4
Law and Justice	116,827	30.16	3
Third Way	51,681	13.34	1
New Left	35,673	9.21	1
Confederation	26,934	6.95	–
There is One Poland	9,204	2.38	–
Nonpartisan Local Government Activists	7,378	1.90	–
Total	387,408	100.00	9
Valid votes	387,408	98.54	
Invalid/blank votes	5,752	1.46	
Total votes	393,160	100.00	
Registered voters/turnout	550,109	71.47	
Source: National Electoral Commission
