= Krzysztof Mróz =

Polish politician (born 1977)

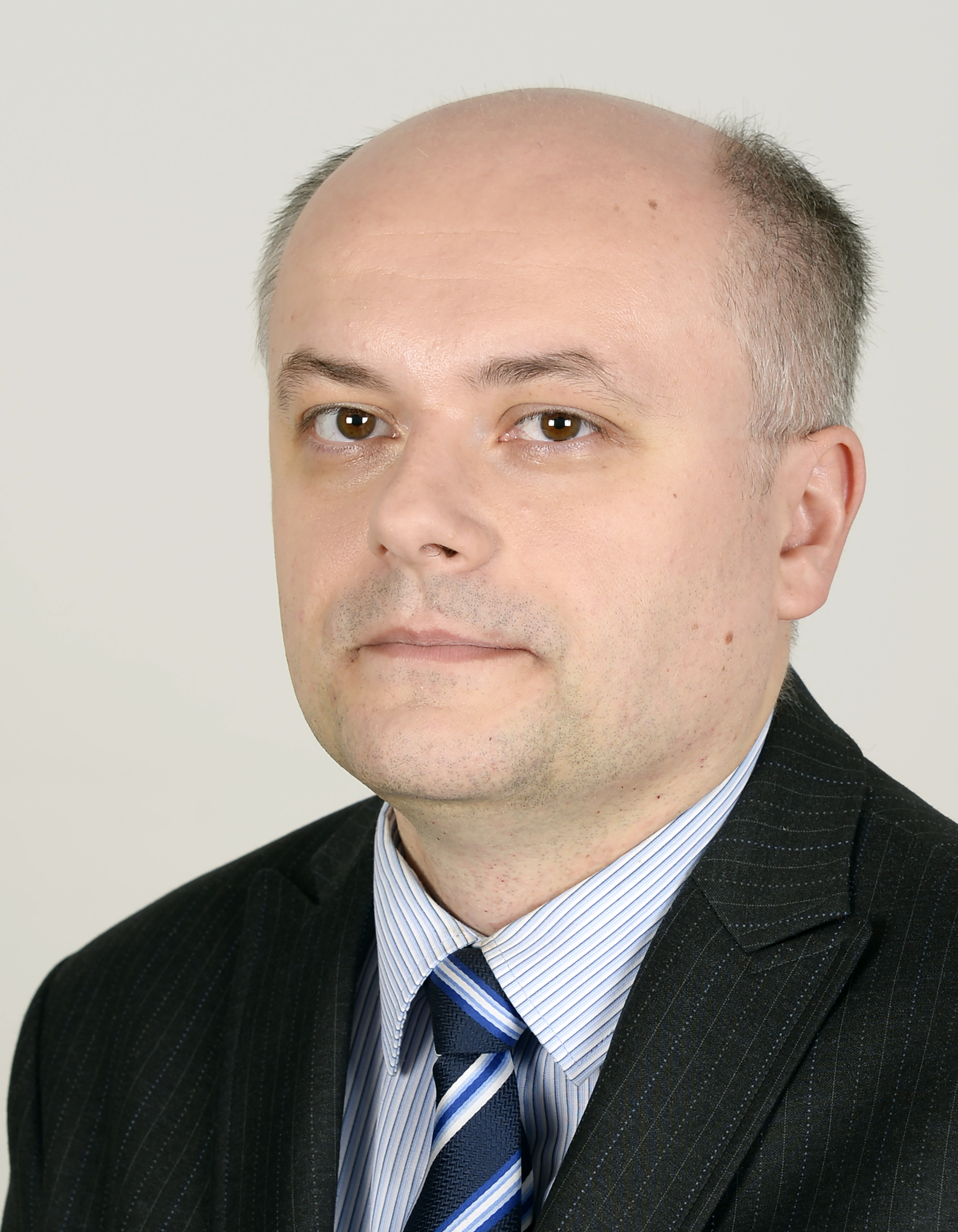
Krzysztof Mróz

Krzysztof Stanisław Mróz (born 8 May 1977) is a Polish politician. He was elected to the Senate of Poland (10th term) representing the constituency of Legnica. He was also elected to the 9th term of the Senate of Poland.
