= 2014 Polish local elections =

2014 Polish regional assembly election
- 16 November 2014 (first round); 30 November 2014 (second round)

555 seats to regional assemblies
- Registered: 30,613,691
- Turnout: 14,466,824 (47.26%) ▼0.09pp
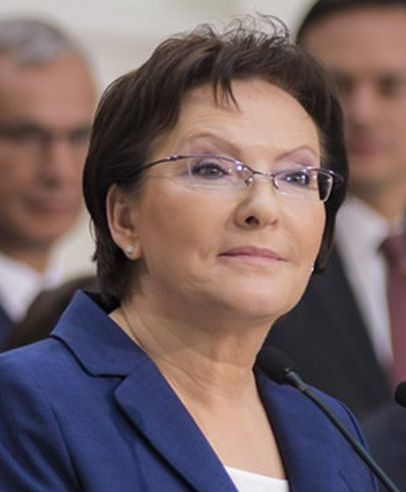

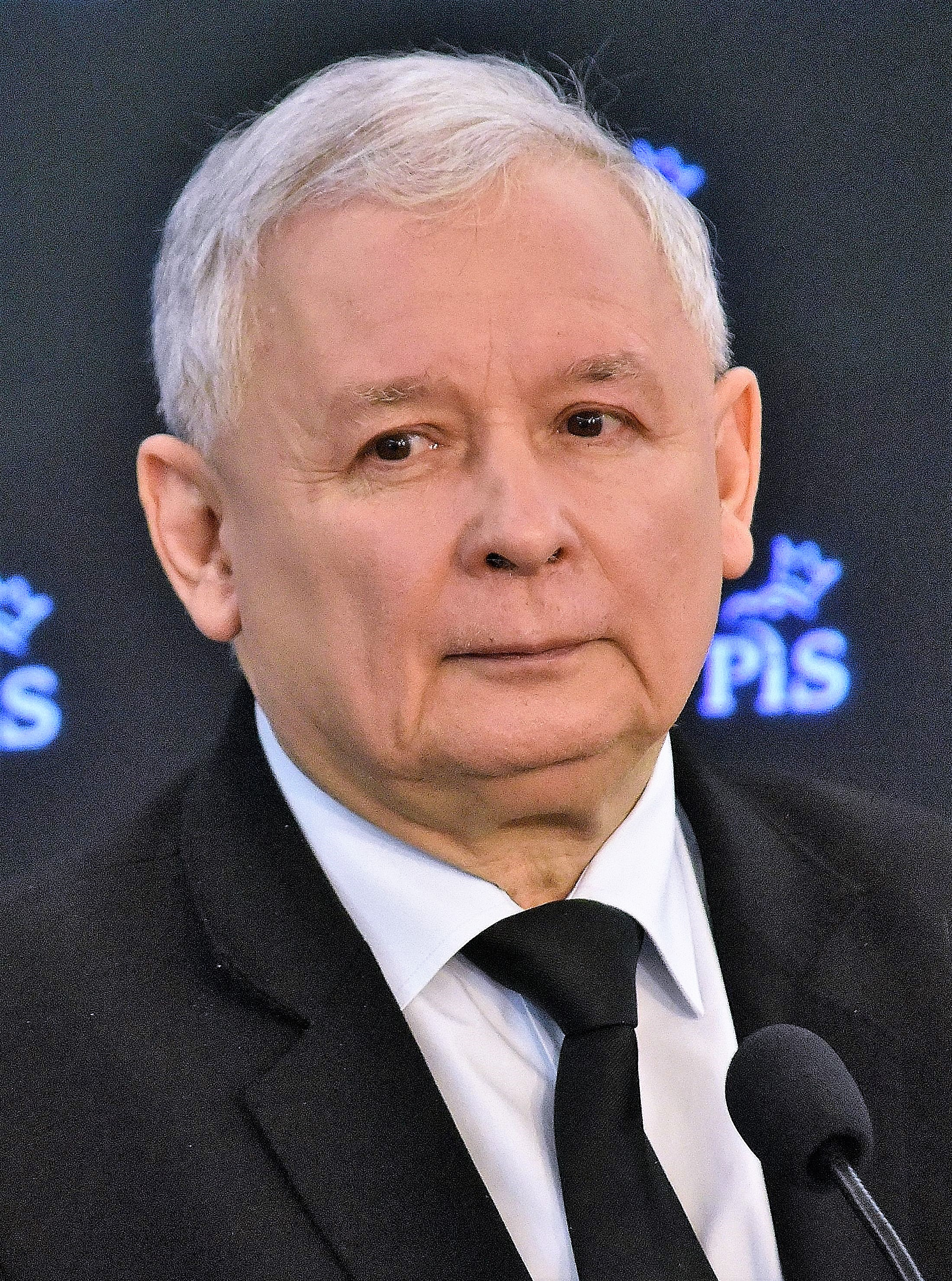

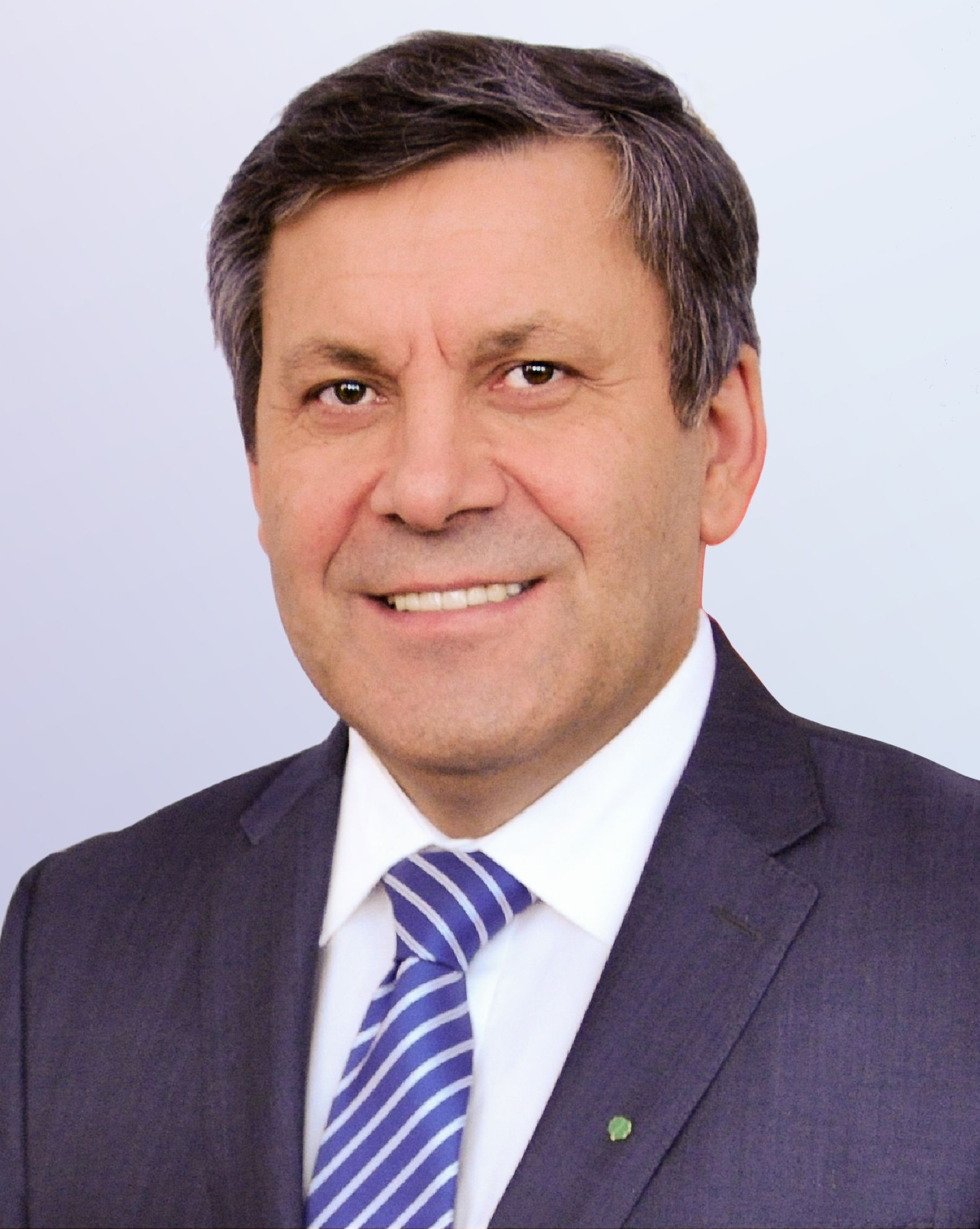

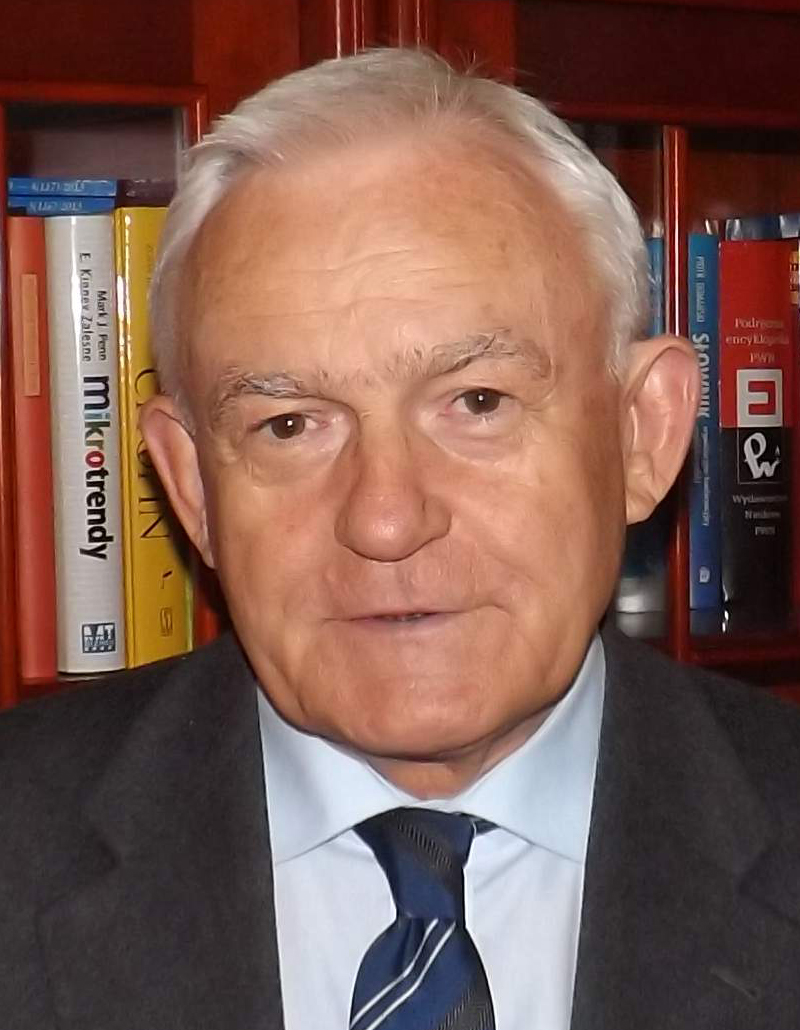

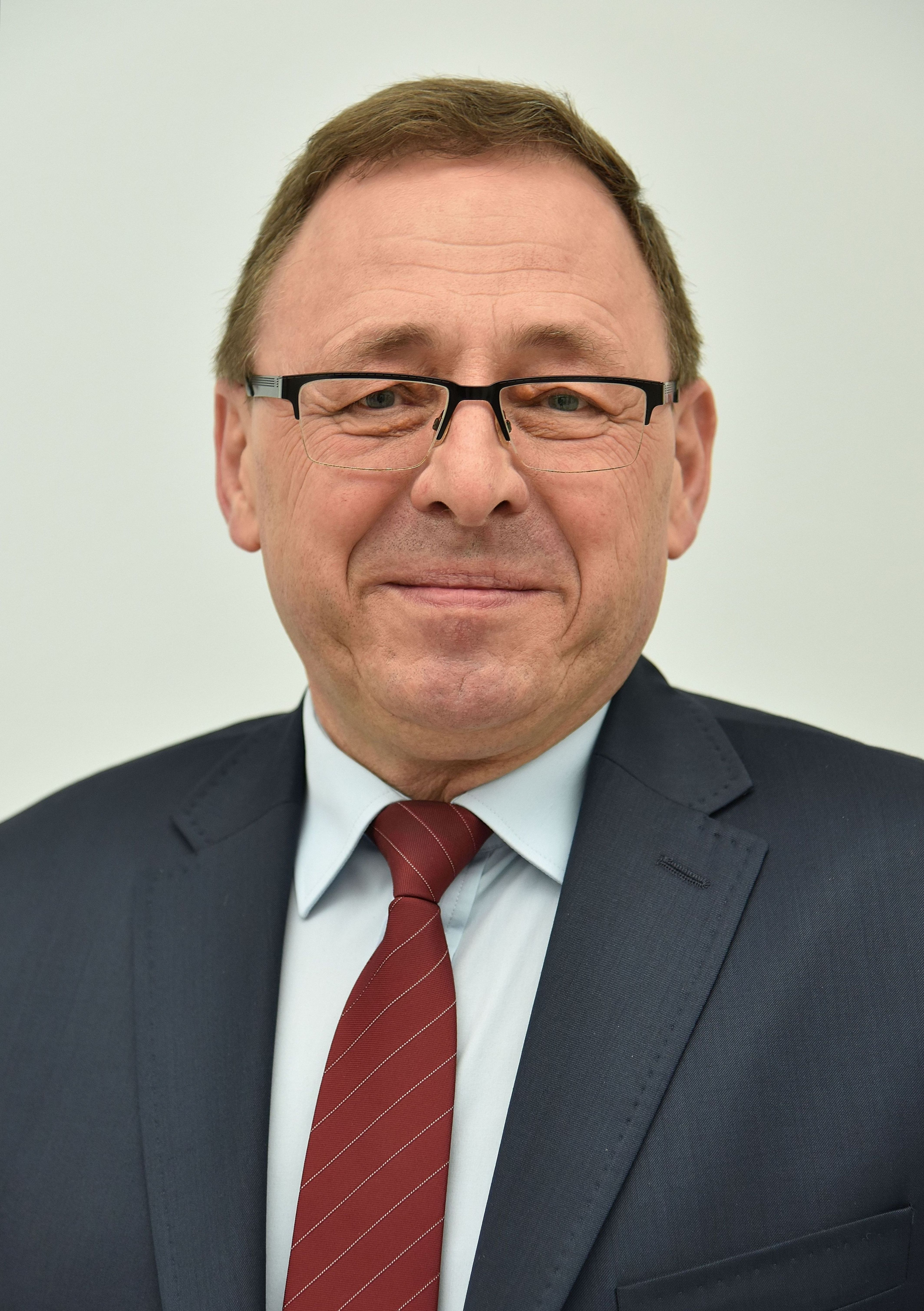

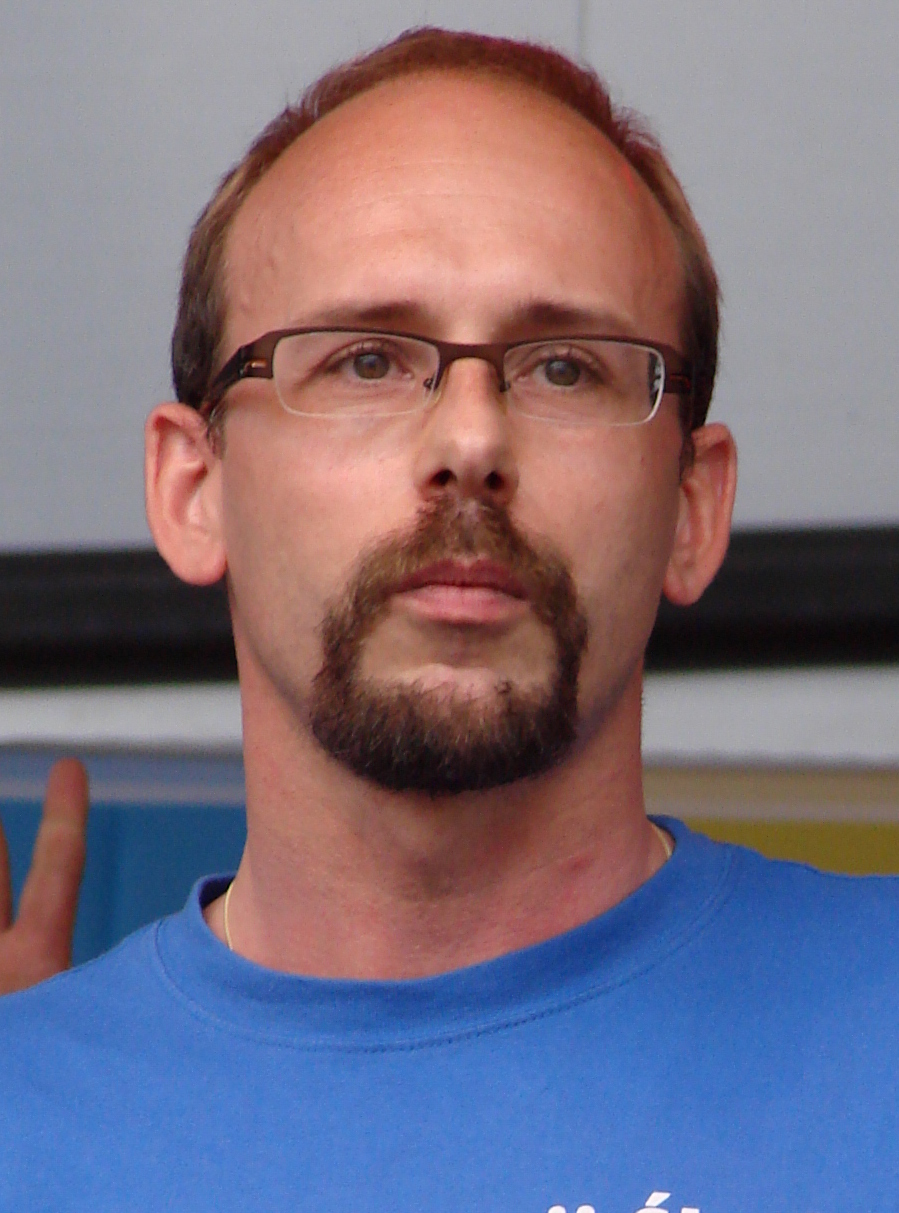
	First party	Second party	Third party
Leader	Ewa Kopacz	Jarosław Kaczyński	Janusz Piechociński
Party	PO	PiS	PSL
Leader since	8 November 2014	18 January 2003	17 November 2012
Last election	30.9%, 222 seats	23.0%, 141 seats	16.3%, 93 seats
Seats won	179	171	157
Seat change	▼43	▲30	▲64
Popular vote	3,136,591	3,207,851	2,848,447
Percentage	26.3%	26.9%	23.9%
Swing	▼4.6pp	▲3.9pp	▲7.6pp
	Fourth party	Fifth party	Sixth party
Leader	Leszek Miller	Ryszard Galla	Jerzy Gorzelik
Party	SLD	MN	RAŚ
Leader since	10 December 2011	25 September 2005	2003
Last election	15.2%, 85 seats	0.4%, 6 seats	1.0%, 3 seats
Seats won	28	7	4
Seat change	▼57	▲1	▲1
Popular vote	1,048,121	41,889	102,833
Percentage	8.8%	0.4%	0.9%
Swing	▼6.4pp	0.0pp	▼0.1pp
- Result of the voivodeship sejmik elections

Local elections were held in Poland on 16 November 2014 to elect members for all 16 regional assemblies (sejmik wojewódzki), 314 county (powiat) councils, (Note: In addition to 314 county councils, there are 66 municipalities with powiat rights, which also perform the powers and duties of counties.) and 2,479 municipal (gmina) councils. The second round was held on 30 November 2014 to elect heads of municipalities, mayors and city presidents in places where no candidate obtained more than 50% of the vote.

The local elections were seen as a test to the ruling Civic Platform and Polish People's Party centre-right conservative liberal coalition government under Prime Minister Ewa Kopacz, after then Prime Minister Donald Tusk became the President of the European Council.

== Background ==
It was the first election for new PM and Civic Platform's Leader Ewa Kopacz. It was also seen as a test for Law and Justice after their good performance in the European Parliament election earlier in the year.

== Voivodeships ==
Seat allocation in voivodeship councils.

=== Election results ===
==== Results by voivodeship ====
Voivodeship Council															
Voivodeship Council	PiS	PO	PSL	SLD	NP-JKM	RN	TR	RAŚ	BS	Direct Democracy	TW	BPZ	MN	LL	Others
Lower Silesia	22.17	32.59	15.90	9.98	3.78	1.40	1.34	—	11.93	0.15	—	—	—	—	0.76
Kuyavia-Pomerania	21.15	32.67	24.33	12.25	3.51	0.96	1.44	—	—	0.12	—	—	—	—	3.55
Lublin	31.88	19.17	32.43	6.94	3.27	2.08	1.02	—	—	0.84	—	—	—	—	2.37
Lubusz	16.91	25.37	22.90	14.85	2.76	1.37	1.06	—	—	0.15	—	—	—	11.94	2.68
Łódź	27.48	26.77	27.04	9.02	3.47	1.31	1.58	—	—	1.20	—	—	—	—	2.12
Lesser Poland	36.71	28.26	20.04	4.74	4.77	1.55	0.94	—	—	0.92	—	—	—	—	2.07
Masovia	28.76	24.06	25.64	7.11	4.18	1.77	0.88	—	—	1.14	—	—	—	—	6.45
Opole	16.79	25.35	21.92	9.48	3.94	0.61	—	2.03	—	0.32	—	—	14.90	—	4.66
Subcarpathian	43.70	15.37	24.39	7.44	3.93	2.30	1.09	—	—	0.22	—	—	—	—	1.55
Podlaskie	33.67	22.46	27.55	6.80	3.66	1.81	0.86	—	—	0.87	—	—	—	—	2.31
Pomeranian	23.40	40.74	17.43	7.78	4.47	1.78	1.56	—	—	1.43	—	—	—	—	1.41
Silesian	25.07	27.21	13.21	10.39	3.98	1.53	0.68	7.20	—	1.23	—	—	—	—	9.49
Świętokrzyskie	24.99	14.10	46.24	8.65	3.37	1.26	—	—	—	0.29	—	—	—	—	1.10
Warmia–Masuria	18.84	26.88	37.09	8.49	3.44	1.68	0.72	—	—	0.75	—	—	—	—	2.10
Greater Poland	19.81	25.73	25.80	11.29	4.04	1.19	1.48	—	—	0.75	7.54	—	—	—	2.35
West Pomeranian	19.29	31.94	20.58	11.82	3.39	1.66	0.35	—	—	0.78	—	9.86	—	—	0.32
Poland	26.89	26.29	23.88	8.79	3.89	1.57	1.00	0.86	0.85	0.81	0.62	0.40	0.35	0.29	3.51
Source: National Electoral Commission

==== Seats distribution ====
Voivodeship Council											
Voivodeship Council	PiS	PO	PSL	SLD	RAŚ	BS	TW	BPZ	MN	LL	Total
Lower Silesia	9	16	5	2	—	4	—	—	—	—	36
Kuyavia-Pomerania	7	14	10	2	—	—	—	—	—	—	33
Lublin	13	7	12	1	—	—	—	—	—	—	33
Lubusz	5	10	8	5	—	—	—	—	—	2	30
Łódź	12	10	10	1	—	—	—	—	—	—	33
Lesser Poland	17	14	8	—	—	—	—	—	—	—	39
Masovia	19	15	16	1	—	—	—	—	—	—	51
Opole	5	9	8	1	—	—	—	—	7	—	30
Subcarpathian	19	5	9	—	—	—	—	—	—	—	33
Podlaskie	12	8	9	1	—	—	—	—	—	—	30
Pomeranian	9	17	7	—	—	—	—	—	—	—	33
Silesian	16	17	5	3	4	—	—	—	—	—	45
Świętokrzyskie	8	3	17	2	—	—	—	—	—	—	30
Warmia–Masuria	6	9	14	1	—	—	—	—	—	—	30
Greater Poland	8	13	12	4	—	—	2	—	—	—	39
West Pomeranian	6	12	7	4	—	—	—	1	—	—	30
Poland	171	179	157	28	4	4	2	1	7	2	555
Source: National Electoral Commission

==== Nationwide vote ====
Party	Votes	%	Seats
Law and Justice	3,207,851	26.89	171
Civic Platform	3,136,591	26.29	179
Polish People's Party	2,848,447	23.88	157
Democratic Left Alliance	1,048,121	8.79	28
Congress of the New Right – of Janusz Korwin-Mikke	463,910	3.89	0
National Movement	186,871	1.57	0
Your Movement	119,485	1.00	0
Silesian Autonomy Movement	102,833	0.86	4
Bezpartyjni Samorządowcy	101,416	0.85	4
Direct Democracy	96,495	0.81	0
Now Wielkopolska	74,327	0.62	2
Mazovian Self-Governance Community	68,686	0.58	0
Independent Self-Governance of the Silesian Voivodeship	62,628	0.53	0
Community Patriotism Solidarity	55,657	0.47	0
Nonpartisans Western Pomerania	47,318	0.40	1
German Minority Electoral Committee	41,889	0.35	7
Self-Defence	37,700	0.32	0
Better Lubuskie – Nonpartisan Self-Government	34,630	0.29	2
League of Polish Families	34,054	0.29	0
National Revival of Poland	17,749	0.15	0
Disgruntled	13,656	0.11	0
Civic Initiative of Powiat Tarnogórski	11,330	0.09	0
Economic Opole	10,514	0.09	0
Minority in Silesia	10,094	0.08	0
Centre of a Social Democracy	9,251	0.08	0
Patriotic Poland	6,704	0.06	0
Slavic Union	6,621	0.06	0
Nonpartisan Active Competent	5,979	0.05	0
List of Bogdan Grobelny	5,958	0.05	0
Farmer Marek Wojtera Electors' Electoral Committee	5,720	0.05	0
Cooperation and Partnership for Warmia and Mazury	5,420	0.05	0
Platform of the Disgruntled	5,008	0.04	0
Polish-Polonia Independence Association	4,842	0.04	0
Our Region	3,561	0.03	0
Our Lubelskie	3,511	0.03	0
Agreement of the Right	3,197	0.03	0
Together for Podkarpacie	3,105	0.03	0
People's Party "Patrimony"	3,054	0.03	0
The Only Voivodeship of Its Kind	3,025	0.03	0
Podlasie Self-Governing Forum	2,481	0.02	0
Always Together	2,033	0.02	0
New Order	1,803	0.02	0
Self-Defence Rebirth	1,772	0.01	0
Future	1,713	0.01	0
Left of Zagłębie	1,560	0.01	0
Party of Józef Piłsudski	1,480	0.01	0
Our Gmina Lubawka-Kalwaria Lubawska	1,446	0.01	0
Self-Governance Platform	1,424	0.01	0
Cooperation and Partnership	1,377	0.01	0
Friends of the Dąbrowa Basin	1,168	0.01	0
Szczecin Riflemen's Society	988	0.01	0
Handsome Grzegorz Kołek Electors' Electoral Committee	983	0.01	0
Citizens' Agreement	712	0.01	0
Residents Together	588	0.00	0
Total	11,928,736	100.00	555
Valid votes	11,928,736	82.46	
Invalid/blank votes	2,538,088	17.54	
Total votes	14,466,824	100.00	
Registered voters/turnout	30,613,691	47.26	
Source: National Electoral Commission

==== Coalitions by Voivodeship ====
Voivodeship	Coalitions
Greater Poland	Civic Platform – Polish People's Party
Kuyavian-Pomeranian	Civic Platform – Polish People's Party
Lesser Poland	Civic Platform – Polish People's Party
Łódż	Civic Platform – Polish People's Party
Lower Silesian	Lower Silesian Club Agreement (Civic Platform – Polish People's Party – Democratic Left Alliance) – Lower Silesian Local Movement
Lublin	Polish People's Party – Civic Platform
Lubusz	Civic Platform – Polish People's Party – Democratic Left Alliance
Masovian	Polish People's Party – Civic Platform
Opole	Civic Platform – Polish People's Party – German Minority
Podlaskie	Polish People's Party – Civic Platform
Pomeranian	Civic Platform – Polish People's Party
Silesian	Civic Platform – Polish People's Party – Silesian Autonomy Movement – Democratic Left Alliance
Subcarpathian	Law and Justice
Świętokrzyskie	Polish People's Party – Civic Platform
Warmian-Masurian	Polish People's Party – Civic Platform
West Pomeranian	Civic Platform – Polish People's Party
