= Ryszard Galla =

Polish politician (born 1956)

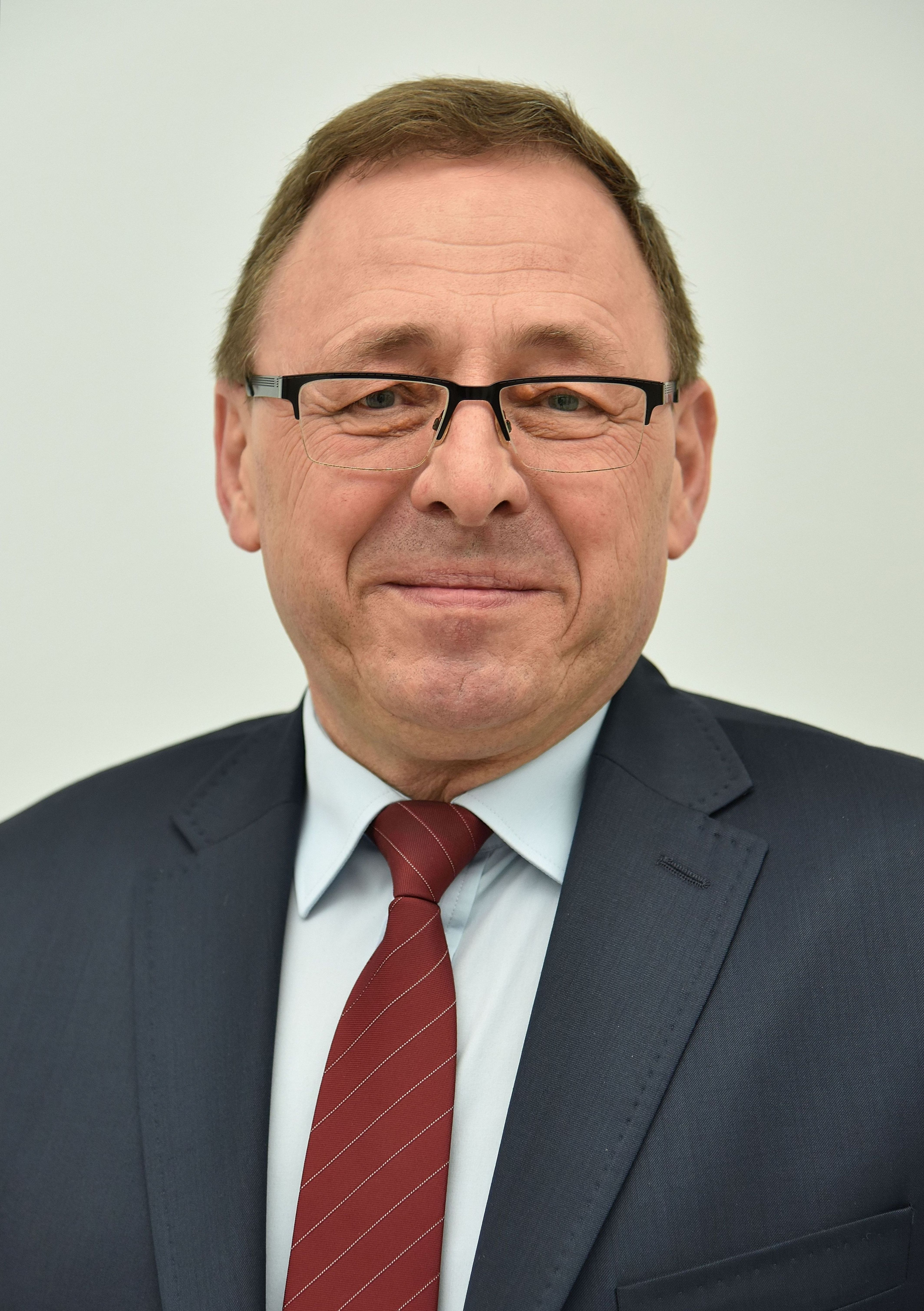

Leader of German Minority
- Incumbent
- Assumed office 20 January 2008
- Preceded by: Henryk Kroll

Member of the Sejm
- In office 25 September 2005 – 12 November 2023

Marshal of Opole Voivodeship
- In office 19 April 2002 – 16 November 2002
- Preceded by: Stanisław Jałowiecki
- Succeeded by: Ewa Olszewska

Personal details
- Born: 22 July 1956 (age 70) Wrocław, People's Republic of Poland
- Citizenship: Polish
- Party: German Minority
- Education: Opole University of Technology
- Website: ryszard-galla.pl

Ryszard Jerzy Galla (born 22 July 1956 in Wrocław) is a Polish politician of German descent. Originally a member of the Opole Regional Assembly and briefly the Marshal of Opole Voivodeship in 2002, Galla was elected to the Sejm during the 2005 parliamentary election, getting 9072 votes in the 21st Opole district, and was the sole Sejm member from the German Minority Electoral Committee (Polish: Mniejszość Niemiecka, German: Deutsche Minderheit) until he lost his seat in the 2023 parliamentary election.

== Biography ==
=== Post Sejm ===
After leaving the Sejm Galla stood for and won a mandate for the Opole Voivodeship Sejmik in 2024.

Galla was appointed the Government Plenipotentiary for National and Ethnic Minorities by Szymon Hołownia on May 15, 2024. Galla was confirmed in a 12-2 vote, with his new responsibilities being to represent all minorities in the Sejm.

== Personal life ==
Galla is the vice-president of the board of the provincial Social and Cultural Society of Germans in Opole Silesia, as well as the president of the Polish-German Cooperation House.

== Electoral history ==
Sejm
Election	Party	Votes	%	Constituency	Elected?
2001	German Minority	2,875	0.92	Opole	No
2005	German Minority	9,072	3.40	Opole	Yes
2007	German Minority	8,193	2.22	Opole	Yes
2011	German Minority	11,794	3.69	Opole	Yes
2015	German Minority	9,623	2.84	Opole	Yes
2019	German Minority	13,957	3.43	Opole	Yes
2023	German Minority	8,743	1.82	Opole	No

Opole Regional Assembly
Election	Party	Votes	%	Constituency	Elected?
1998	TSKN (Note: The Social and Cultural Association of Germans)	2,050	3.44	nr.4	Yes
2002	German Minority	8,737	13.36	nr.1	Yes
2024	Śląscy Samorządowcy	3,873	4.57	nr.1	Yes

== See also ==
- List of Sejm members (2005–2007)
