= Włodzimierz Skalik =

Polish politician (born 1959)

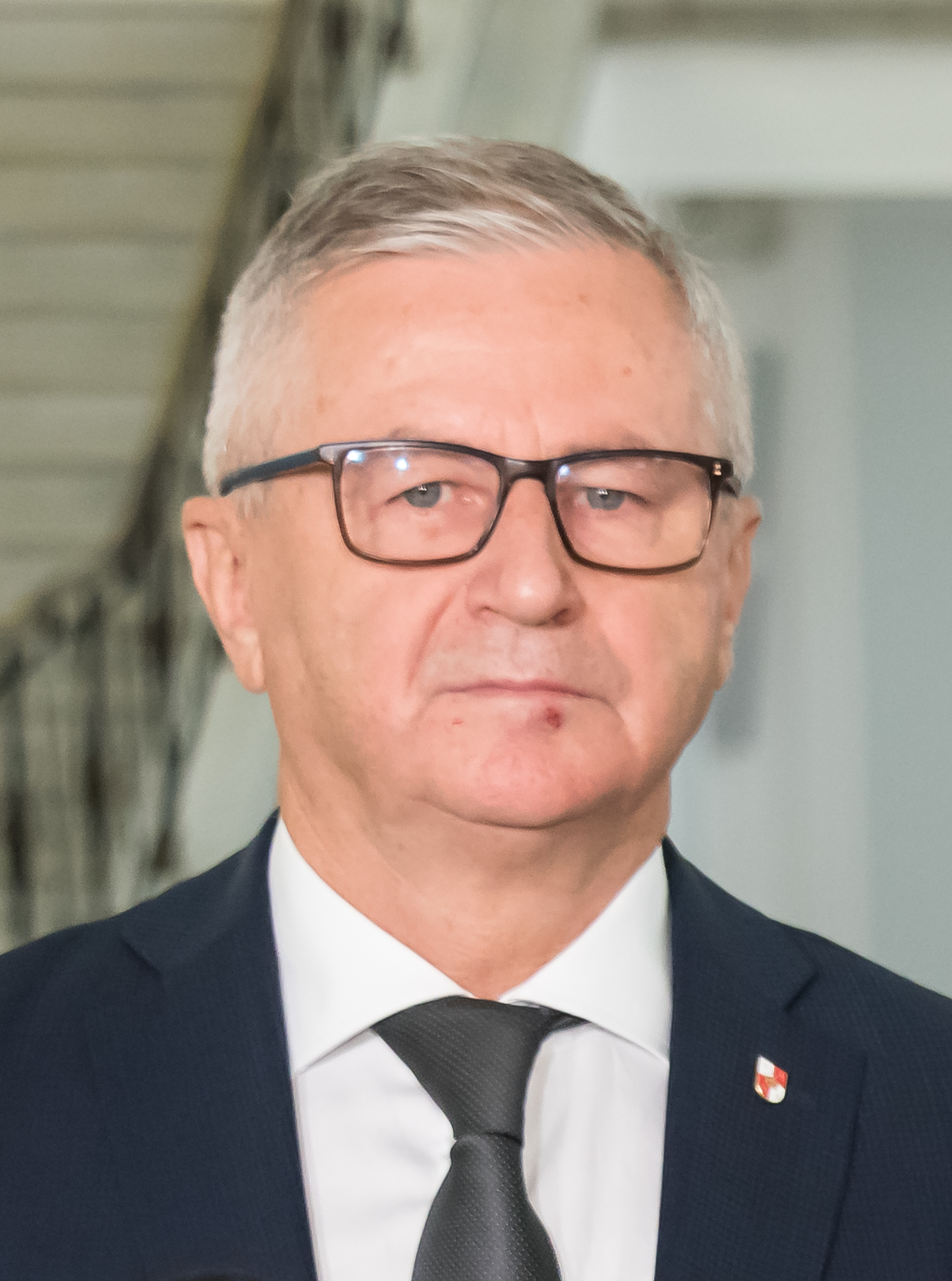
- Skalik in 2023

Member of the Sejm
- Incumbent
- Assumed office 13 November 2023
- Constituency: 21 – Opole

Personal details
- Born: 10 June 1959 (age 67) Radomsko
- Party: Confederation of the Polish Crown
- Children: 4
- Education: National Defence University of Warsaw
- Awards: Order of Polonia Restituta Cross of Valour (Poland)

Włodzimierz Skalik (born 10 June 1959) is a Polish politician, businessman and pilot who serves as a member of the 10th term Sejm.

== Early life and education ==
Skalik was born in Radomsko. He studied at the National Defense University of Warsaw.

Skalik began his aviation training at the Częstochowa Aero Club (a regional branch of the Polish Aero Club) in 1975. In March 2010, he was elected president of the Polish Aero Club, a position he held until March 2018. Also in 2010, Skalik became one of the vice-presidents of the World Air Sports Federation (FAI).

== Political career ==
In 2006, Skalik was elected as a councilor of the Silesian Voivodeship Sejmik from the Law and Justice party list. In 2007, he joined the Right of the Republic. He unsuccessfully ran for a parliamentary seat in the early parliamentary elections from the list of the League of Polish Families. In 2018, as a representative of the Right of the Republic, Skalik ran for the Silesian Voivodeship Sejmik from the list of the Kukiz'15 committee, which did not win any seats. In 2019, as a non-party candidate, he unsuccessfully ran for the European Parliament from the Confederation list. In the elections in the same year, he also unsuccessfully ran for the Sejm from the Confederation list.

In the 2023 parliamentary elections, Skalik won a parliamentary seat from the list of the same party, running in the Opole district and winning 15190 votes.

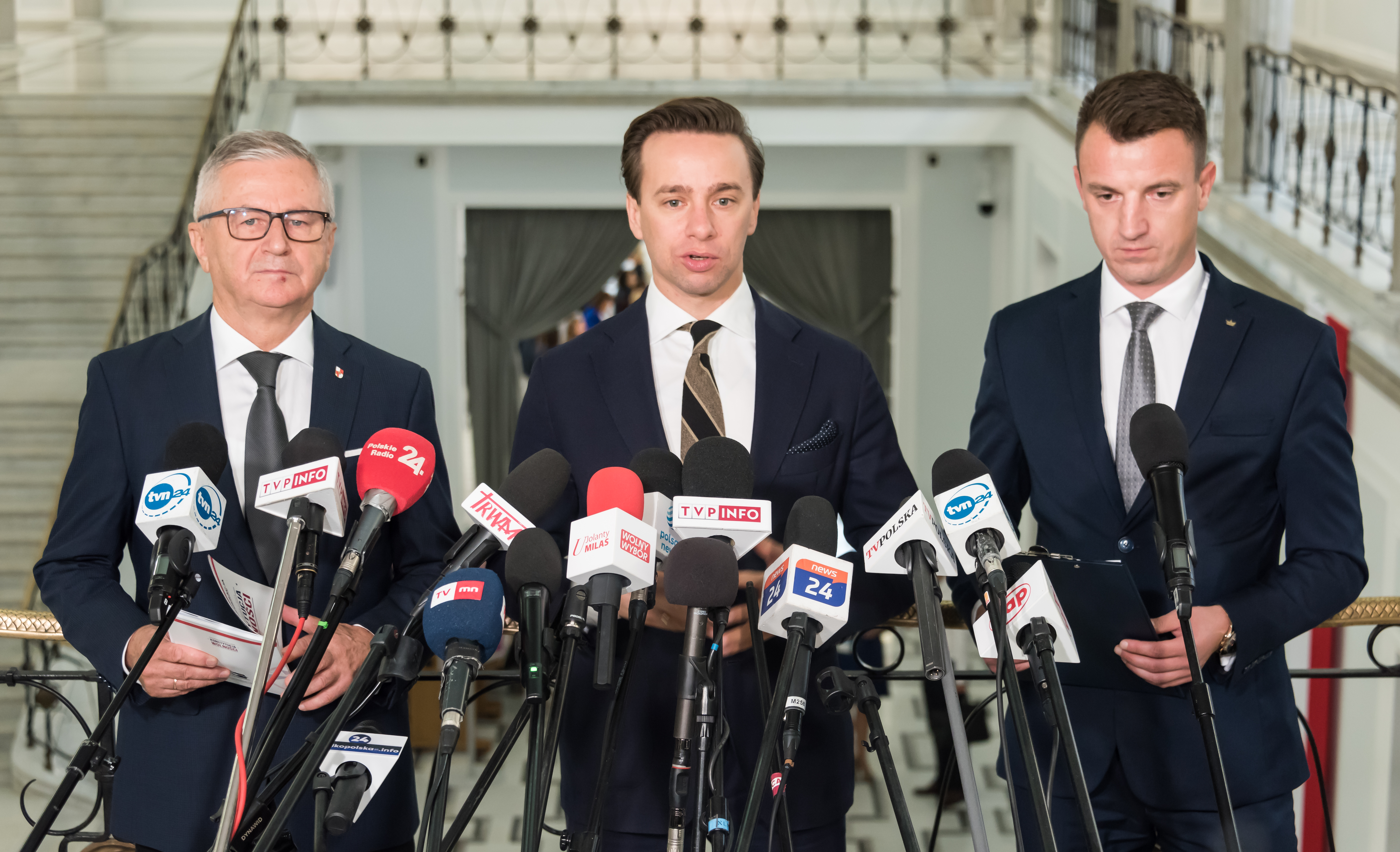
MPs Skalik, Krzysztof Bosak and Ryszard Wilk during a press conference

== Personal life ==
Skalik is married, has four children.

== Honours and awards ==
- Poland :
  - Knight's Cross of the Order of Polonia Restituta (2005)
  - Gold Cross of Merit (1995)
