= Barbara Bartuś =

Polish politician

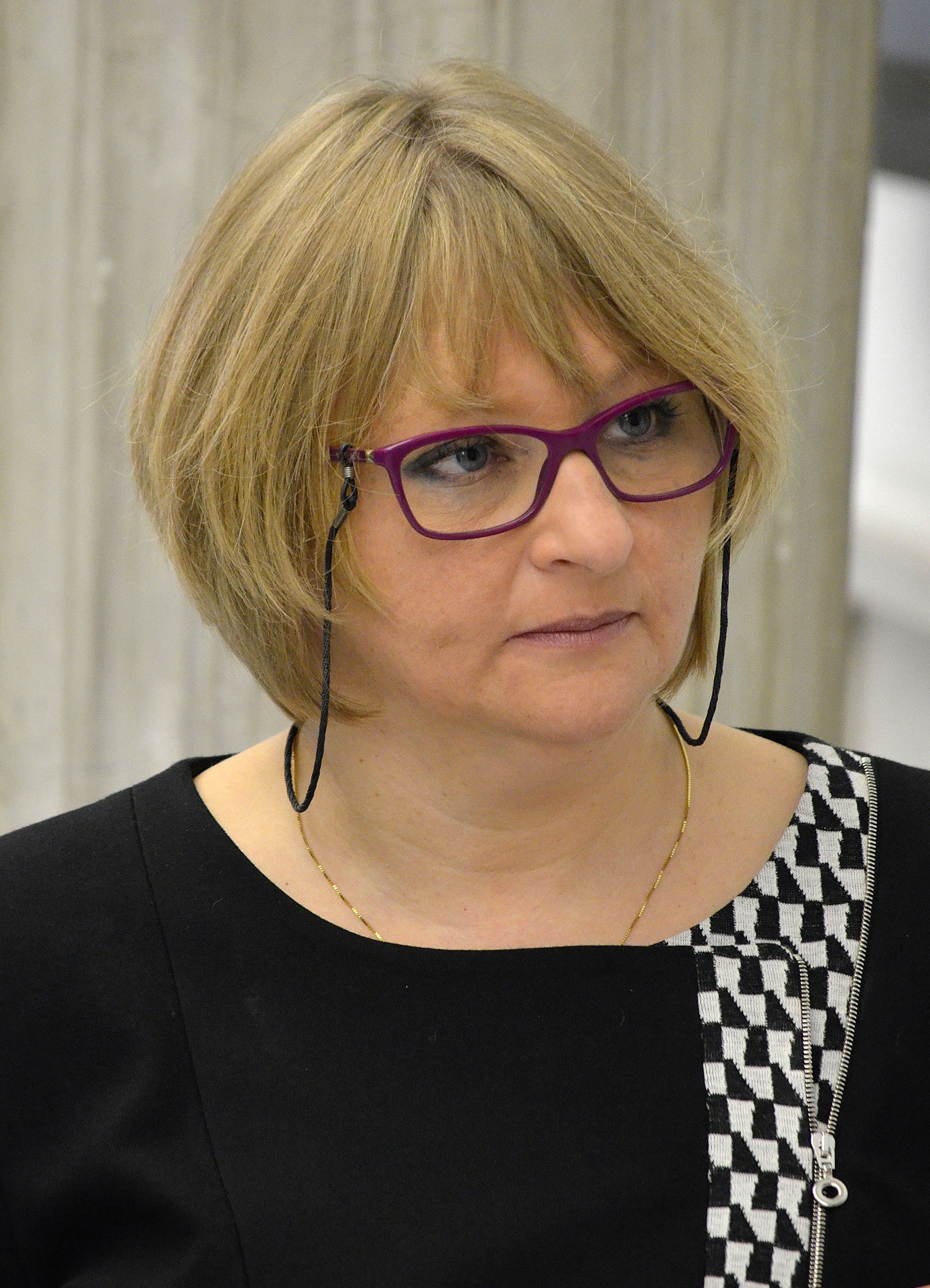
- Born: June 3, 1967 (age 59); Gorlice
- Occupation: politician
- Website: https://barbarabartus.pl/

Barbara Halina Bartuś née Gurbisz (born 3 July 1967 in Gorlice) is a Polish politician, a Member of Polish Parliament from 4th to 10th Sejm.

== Life and education ==
Bartuś graduated from Stanisław Wyspiański High School in Biecz. In 2000 she graduated from the University of Maria Curie-Skłodowska in Lublin from a faculty of Law and Administration (Rzeszów section) with a degree of Master of Administration and in 2003 from a Faculty of Law at University of Rzeszów with a degree of Master of Law.

Until 1999 she belonged to Christian National Union. From 1999 she worked in Social Insurance Institution (ZUS). She was a councillady of Gmina Lipinki during its 2nd tenure. In January 2005 she became a member of Law and Justice. In 2006 she was chosen to be a member of council of Gorlice County. In 2009, 2014 and 2019 she tried unsuccessfully to become a member of the European Parliament.

During the 2007 Polish parliamentary election she became a Member of Parliament from the Law and Justice electoral list. She stood for Sejm Constituency no. 14 and got 10,856 votes. in the 2011 Polish parliamentary election she got 14,652 votes, which again made her an MP During the 2015 Polish parliamentary election she became an MP for the third time. During the 2019 Polish parliamentary election and 2023 Polish parliamentary election she got also reelected, getting respectively 23,468 and 21,250 votes.

== Personal life ==
She is married (to Adam Bartuś), and has 2 daughters.

== Bibliography ==
- "Strona sejmowa posła VII kadencji".
- Sejm Rzeczypospolitej Polskiej. VII kadencja. Przewodnik, Wydawnictwo Sejmowe, Warszawa 2012, s. 33.
