= Weronika Smarduch =

Polish politician (born 1990)

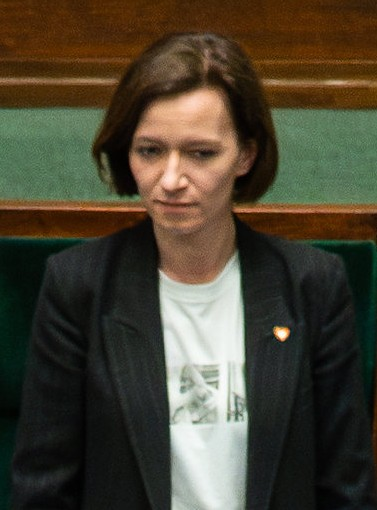
- Smarduch in 2024

Member of the Sejm
- Incumbent
- Assumed office 13 November 2023
- Constituency: Nowy Sącz

Personal details
- Born: 8 April 1990 (age 36)
- Party: Civic Platform

Weronika Smarduch (born 8 April 1990) is a Polish politician serving as a member of the Sejm since 2023. She is the leader of the Civic Platform in Nowy Targ County, and a deputy leader of the party in Lesser Poland Voivodeship.
