= Rajmund Miller =

Polish politician (1954–2024)

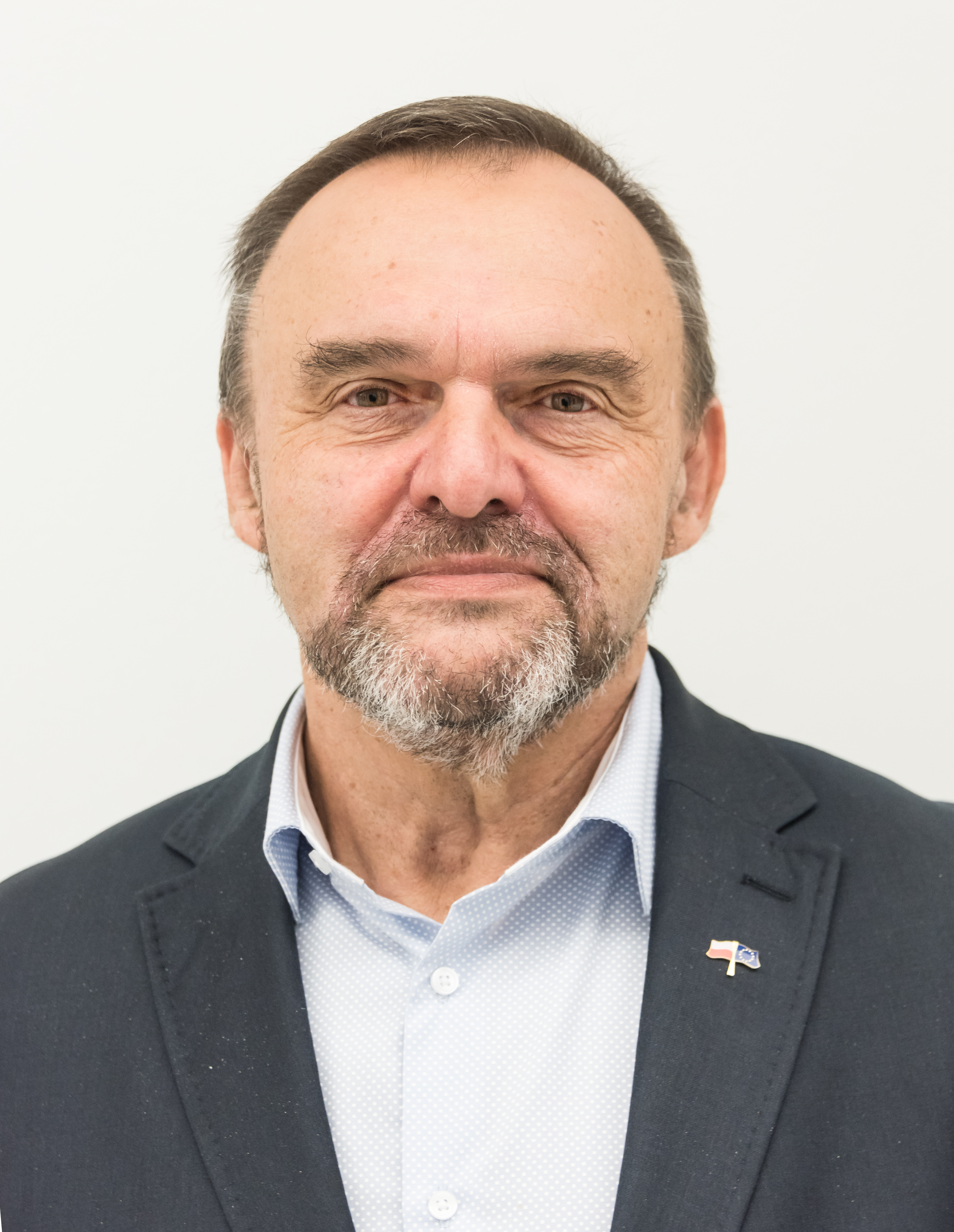
- Miller in 2022

Member of the Sejm for Constituency no. 21
- In office 8 November 2011 – 27 March 2024

Personal details
- Born: Rajmund Tadeusz Miller; 16 July 1954 Kielce, Poland
- Died: 27 March 2024 (aged 69) Katowice, Poland
- Party: PO
- Education: Medical University of Łódź
- Occupation: Doctor

Rajmund Tadeusz Miller (16 July 1954 – 26 March 2024) was a Polish doctor and politician. A member of the Civic Platform, he served in the Sejm from 2011 to 2024.

Miller died of cancer in Katowice, on 26 March 2024, at the age of 69.
