= Opinion polling for the 2007 Polish parliamentary election =

In the run up to the 2007 Polish parliamentary election, various organisations carried out opinion polling to gauge voting intention in Poland. Results of such polls are displayed in this article.

== Graphical summary ==
Graphical summary of opinion polls: Civic Platform Law and Justice Left and Democrats Polish People's Party Self-Defence League of Polish Families Democratic Left Alliance (Note: Contested election under the Left and Democrats (Polish: Lewica i Demokraci) alliance.) Social Democracy Democratic Party

== Opinion polls ==
=== 2007 ===
Polling Firm/Link	Last Date of Polling	PiS	PO	SLD	UP	SDPL	PD	PSL	SRP	LPR	Others	Undecided	Lead
Election results	October 21, 2007	32.1	41.5	13.2				8.9	1.5	1.3	1.5	-	9.4
GfK Polonia	October 19, 2007	35	42	12				8	2	0	1		7
PGB	October 19, 2007	31	35	17				8	3	5	1		4
TNS OBOP	October 18, 2007	33	44	12				8	1	2	1		11
PBS DGA	October 18, 2007	32	42	12				7	3	3	1		10
SMG/KRC	October 18, 2007	26	36	10				8	3	1	3	13	10
ARC	October 17, 2007	33	42	14				7	2	1			9
Pentor	October 17, 2007	29	43	16				6	2	2	2		14
PBS DGA	October 17, 2007	31	41	14				7	3	2	2		10
PGB	October 17, 2007	32.7	32.9	18.2				6.1	4.0	5.6	0.5		0.2
PBS DGA	October 16, 2007	34	39	15				7	2	2	1		5
PBS DGA	October 15, 2007	35	40	13				6	2	2	2		5
PBS DGA	October 14, 2007	37	38	11				7	2	3	2		1
CBOS	October 14, 2007	34	39	12				8	2	3	5	-	5
TNS OBOP	October 12, 2007	33	39	15				8	2	2	1	-	6
PBS DGA	October 11, 2007	38	33	13				7	3	4	2	-	6
PBS DGA	October 10, 2007	36	32	15				7	4	5	1	-	4
SMG/KRC	October 9, 2007	33	33	15				6	3	4		6	Tie
PBS DGA	October 9, 2007	34	36	15				6	3	4	2	-	2
PBS DGA	October 8, 2007	33	36	17				6	3	4	1	-	3
Primary election	October 7, 2007	17.4	34.0	24.7				9.7	4.2	4.8	4.3	-	9.3
PBS DGA	October 7, 2007	35	36	15				6	3	3	2	-	1
PBS DGA	October 6, 2007	36	32	15				7	3	4	3	-	4
SMG/KRC	October 6, 2007	31	31	15				6	3	2		12	Tie
PBS DGA	October 4, 2007	38	32	16				6	?	?	8	-	6
PBS DGA	October 3, 2007	37	32	16				5	5	3	2	-	5
PGB	October 3, 2007	36	33	16				5	4	6	-	-	3
PBS DGA	October 2, 2007	36	31	15				6	5	4	3	-	5
PBS DGA	October 1, 2007	31	36	14				4	5	5	5	-	5
PBS DGA	September 29, 2007	32	34	16				5	3	3	7	-	2
Pentor	September 26, 2007	35.7	36.3	12.5				4.9	3.0	3.1	4.5	-	0.6
PGB	September 23, 2007	35	31	15				5	5	7	2	-	4
PGB	September 19, 2007	34	33	16				4	4	7	2	-	1
SMG/KRC	September 18, 2007	35	32	16				4	5	3	1	4	3
SMG/KRC	September 16, 2007	36.1	31.3	15.3				4.0	4.8	1.1	0.8	5.8	4.8
TNS OBOP	September 16, 2007	34	34	12				6	4	3	7	-	Tie
PBS DGA	September 16, 2007	29	30	12				2	2	2	4	19	1
PGB	September 14, 2007	33	30	18				5	4	7	2	-	3
PBS DGA	September 9, 2007	28	28	11				3	5	3	2	20	Tie
GfK Polonia	September 9, 2007	29	31	8				3	2	1	2	23	2
TNS OBOP	September 9, 2007	29	30	14				4	4	2	3	14	1
GfK Polonia	September 6, 2007	29	32	10				4	5	-	5	15	3
CBOS	September 4, 2007	30	28	12				5	2	2	5	14	2
PBS DGA	September 2, 2007	30	26	13				5	6	6		16	4
GfK Polonia	August 26, 2007	28	31	9				2	5	1	4	17	3
PBS DGA	August 26, 2007	22	31	12				5	5	5	-	20	9
PGB	August 15, 2007	28	35	15				4	13 (Note: This poll referred to League and Self-Defense, a possible coalition between Self-Defence and the League of Polish Families, which ultimately never materialised.)		4	-	7
CBOS	August 6, 2007	24	30	10				3	6		9	17	6
TNS OBOP	August 6, 2007	20	33	10				4	6	3	7	17	13
PGB	July 31, 2007	25	35	16				5	14		4	-	10
TNS OBOP	July 9, 2007	22	30	13				3	7	5	5	15	8
CBOS	July 2, 2007	25	27	12				5	6	2	6	16	2
PBS DGA	June 26, 2007	28	32	11				2	4	3	-	18	4
PBS DGA	June 11, 2007	27	31	12				3	6	3	3	15	4
TNS OBOP	June 5, 2007	26	33	11				3	9	2	4	12	7
CBOS	June 4, 2007	27	29	13				3	6	2	5	15	2
GfK Polonia	May 30, 2007	27	28	11				3	6	2	4	19	1
CBOS	May 14, 2007	23	27	12				3	6	3	8	17	4
TNS OBOP	May 14, 2007	24	34	12				2	6	3	6	13	10
TNS OBOP	April 26, 2007	22	30	15				3	4	3	6	17	8
CBOS	April 2, 2007	23	29	12				5	4	3	6	19	6
CBOS	March 5, 2007	24	30	12				5	5	3	7	14	6
TNS OBOP	March 5, 2007	22	34	11				5	5	5	8	10	12
CBOS	February 5, 2007	25	30	11				4	6	5	5	14	5
TNS OBOP	February 5, 2007	28	31	6	-	3	1	5	7	4	4	11	3
CBOS	January 15, 2007	26	33	8				4	6	4	4	15	7
TNS OBOP	January 9, 2007	27	32	6	-	2	1	4	6	4	5	13	5

=== 2006 ===
Polling Firm/Link	Last Date of Polling	PiS	PO	SLD	UP	SDPL	PD	PSL	SRP	LPR	Others	Undecided	Lead
PBS DGA	December 17, 2006	27	31	11				5	8	2	-	16	4
CBOS	December 4, 2006	27	30	12				5	4	2	6	14	3
TNS OBOP	December 4, 2006	33	29	6	-	3	1	4	5	3	3	13	4
PBS DGA	November 19, 2006	26	31	12				6	5	4	2	14	5
Local elections	November 12, 2006	25.1	27.2	14.3				13.2	5.6	4.7	9.9	-	2.1
GfK Polonia	November 2006	24	30	7				5	10	3	-	21	6
TNS OBOP	November 6, 2006	26	32	7	-	3	0	5	5	6	5	11	6
PBS DGA	November 5, 2006	24	32	11				4	8	3	2	16	8
CBOS	November 5, 2006	26	27	5	1	1	1	6	7	6	1	18	1
CBOS	October 24, 2006	26	35	5	1	1	0	3	6	3	3	16	9
PBS DGA	October 22, 2006	25	31	12				3	8	3	2	16	6
CBOS	October 9, 2006	25	38	6	1	2	1	3	7	3	4	11	13
TNS OBOP	October 9, 2006	22	35	8	-	3	0	4	9	4	5	10	13
PBS DGA	October 8, 2006	23	35	7	-	-	-	2	10	3	3	17	12
PBS DGA	September 17, 2006	26	28	7	-	-	-	3	12	4	3	17	2
CBOS	September 11, 2006	26	29	6	1	1	1	2	10	3	4	16	3
TNS OBOP	September 11, 2006	24	30	6	-	3	3	3	8	4	3	16	6
PBS DGA	September 3, 2006	27	29	7	-	-	-	2	7	3	6	19	2
PBS DGA	August 20, 2006	26	28	7	-	-	-	2	11	3	3	20	2
CBOS	August 7, 2006	27	31	6	1	2	1	3	10	4	4	12	5
TNS OBOP	August 7, 2006	29	30	6	-	3	1	6	8	3	1	13	1
PBS DGA	August 6, 2006	31	25	8	-	-	-	3	6	4	5	18	6
PBS DGA	July 23, 2006	29	27	7	-	-	-	2	10	4	3	18	2
TNS OBOP	July 10, 2006	24	32	10	-	4	0	3	7	3	2	15	8
PBS DGA	July 9, 2006	25	28	7	-	-	-	2	11	2	4	21	3
CBOS	July 4, 2006	29	27	6	1	2	1	3	10	3	4	13	2
PBS DGA	June 25, 2006	31	30	6	-	-	-	2	6	4	2	19	1
CBOS	June 5, 2006	26	31	7	0	2	1	3	7	3	5	16	5
TNS OBOP	June 5, 2006	21	33	6	-	3	2	3	10	4	3	15	12
PBS DGA	June 4, 2006	26	34	8	-	-	-	2	8	2	2	18	8
PBS DGA	May 21, 2006	28	29	10	-	-	-	2	10	2	2	17	1
CBOS	May 15, 2006	24	30	7	1	3	1	3	8	3	7	14	6
TNS OBOP	May 15, 2006	25	33	7	-	3	2	2	12	5	4	7	8
PBS DGA	May 7, 2006	27	29	7	-	-	-	2	10	5	4	16	2
PBS DGA	April 23, 2006	27	33	6	-	-	-	2	10	3	2	17	6
TNS OBOP	April 10, 2006	27	36	11	-	3	0	2	8	3	1	9	9
CBOS	April 4, 2006	30	32	9	0	0	1	1	8	2	4	14	2
PBS DGA	April 2, 2006	29	32	8	-	-	-	2	7	4	2	16	3
PBS DGA	March 19, 2006	32	33	7	-	-	-	2	5	3	2	16	1
TNS OBOP	March 13, 2006	35	31	10	-	2	2	3	6	3	2	6	4
CBOS	March 6, 2006	33	29	7	0	2	2	2	6	6	1	11	4
PBS DGA	March 5, 2006	33	35	9	-	-	-	3	9	5	6	-	2
CBOS	February 21, 2006	33	31	8	0	3	1	2	8	5	0	9	2
PBS DGA	February 19, 2006	38	32	9	2		-	2	10	3	4	-	6
CBOS	February 6, 2006	34	24	7	0	1	1	4	11	5	4	9	10
TNS OBOP	February 6, 2006	32	33	6	-	3	1	1	7	6	2	9	1
PBS DGA	February 5, 2006	37	35	10	3		-	1	7	4	3	-	2
PGB	February 1, 2006	28	26	14	-	(SLD)	3	6	11	7	3	-	2
TNS OBOP	January 25, 2006	32	33	6	-	2	1	2	7	2	1	12	1
CBOS (Note: In this poll, the sample were asked how they would vote in a possible snap election.)	January 23, 2006	35	31	7	0	2	2	1	7	5	0	10	4
PBS DGA	January 22, 2006	40	35	8	-	-	-	3	7	3	4	-	5
PGB	January 16, 2006	28	26	14	-	(SLD)	2	5	12	10	2	-	2
CBOS	January 9, 2006	39	25	5	0	1	2	4	8	5	0	10	14
TNS OBOP	January 9, 2006	35	33	6	-	2	2	2	4	5	2	9	2
PBS DGA	January 8, 2006	39	29	7	-	-	-	4	9	5	7	-	10

=== 2005 ===
Polling Firm/Link	Last Date of Polling	PiS	PO	SLD	UP	SDPL	PD	PSL	SRP	LPR	Others	Undecided	Lead
PBS DGA	December 18, 2005	37	29	9	4		-	4	7	5	5	-	8
CBOS	December 5, 2005	39	30	4	0	3	1	3	8	4	3	6	9
TNS OBOP	December 5, 2005	32	31	6	-	2	1	3	8	4	5	8	1
PBS DGA	December 4, 2005	36	33	8	3		2	3	10	4	1	-	3
TNS OBOP	November 14, 2005	34	32	6	-	3	1	3	7	2	4	8	2
CBOS	November 14, 2005	43	28	5	0	1	2	2	8	5	1	5	15
PBS DGA	November 6, 2005	39	32	7	2		1	3	11	3	2	-	7
Presidential elections - II Round	October 23, 2005	54.0	46.0	-	-	-	-	-	-	-	-	-	8.0
Presidential elections - I Round	October 9, 2005	33.1	36.3	-	-	10.3	1.3	1.8	15.1	-	2.1	-	3.0
PBS DGA	October 2, 2005	32	26	9	4		2	6	13	6	2	-	6
Election results	September 25, 2005	27	24.1	11.3	3.9		2.5	7	11.4	8	4.9	-	2.9
