= Janusz Kowalski (politician) =

Polish politician (born 1978)

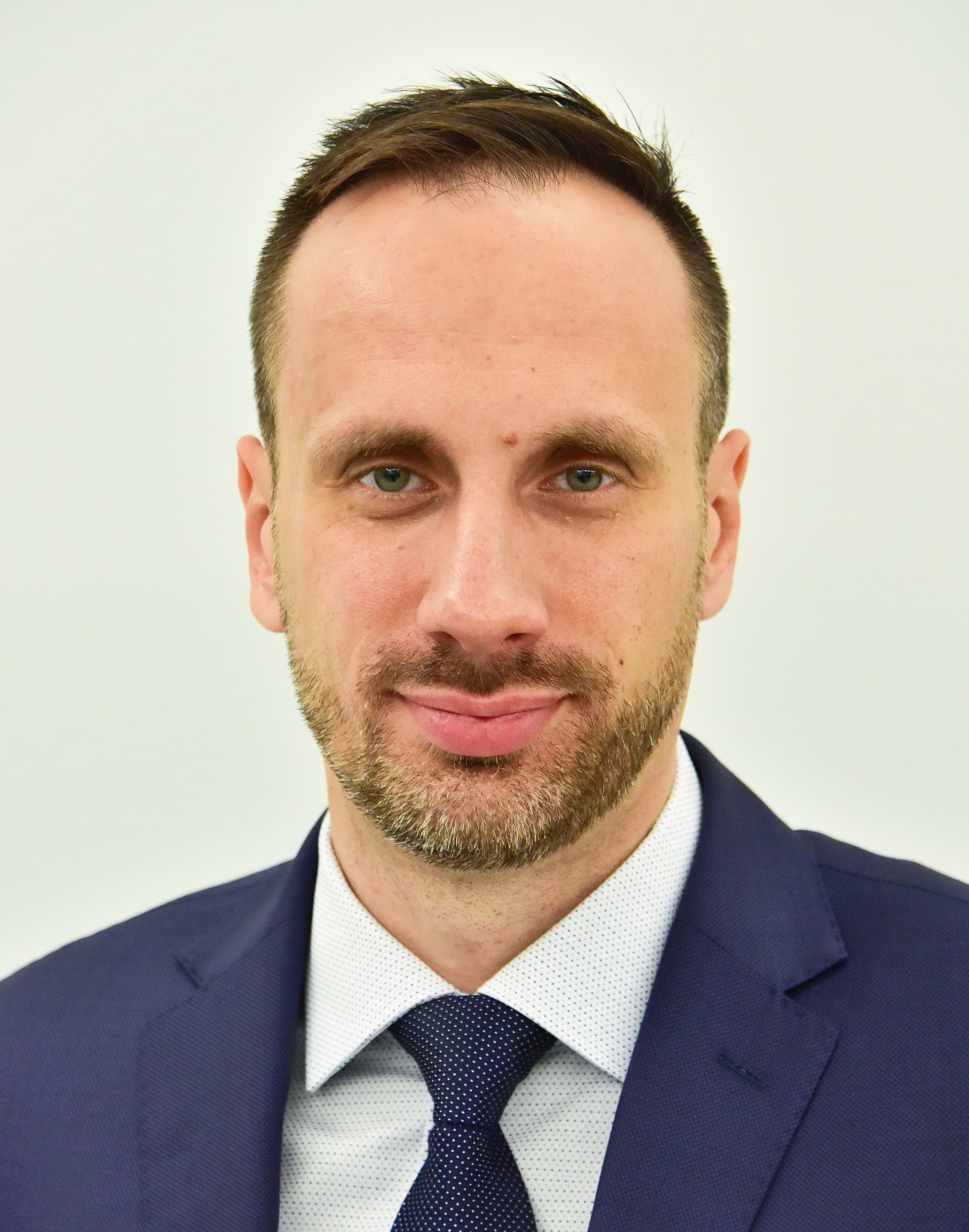
- Kowalski in 2019

Member of the Sejm
- Incumbent
- Assumed office 12 November 2019
- Constituency: Opole

Personal details
- Born: 11 April 1978 (age 48)
- Party: Independent (2026–present)
- Other political affiliations: SKL (1998–2001); PP (2001–2002); PO (2005–2006); SP (2019–2024); PiS (2002, 2024–2026)

Janusz Kowalski (born 11 April 1978) is a Polish politician serving as a member of the Sejm since 2019. From 2019 to 2021, he served as secretary of state of the Ministry of State Assets. From 2022 to 2023, he served as secretary of state of the Ministry of Agriculture and Rural Development.
