= Adam Gomoła =

Polish politician (born 1999)

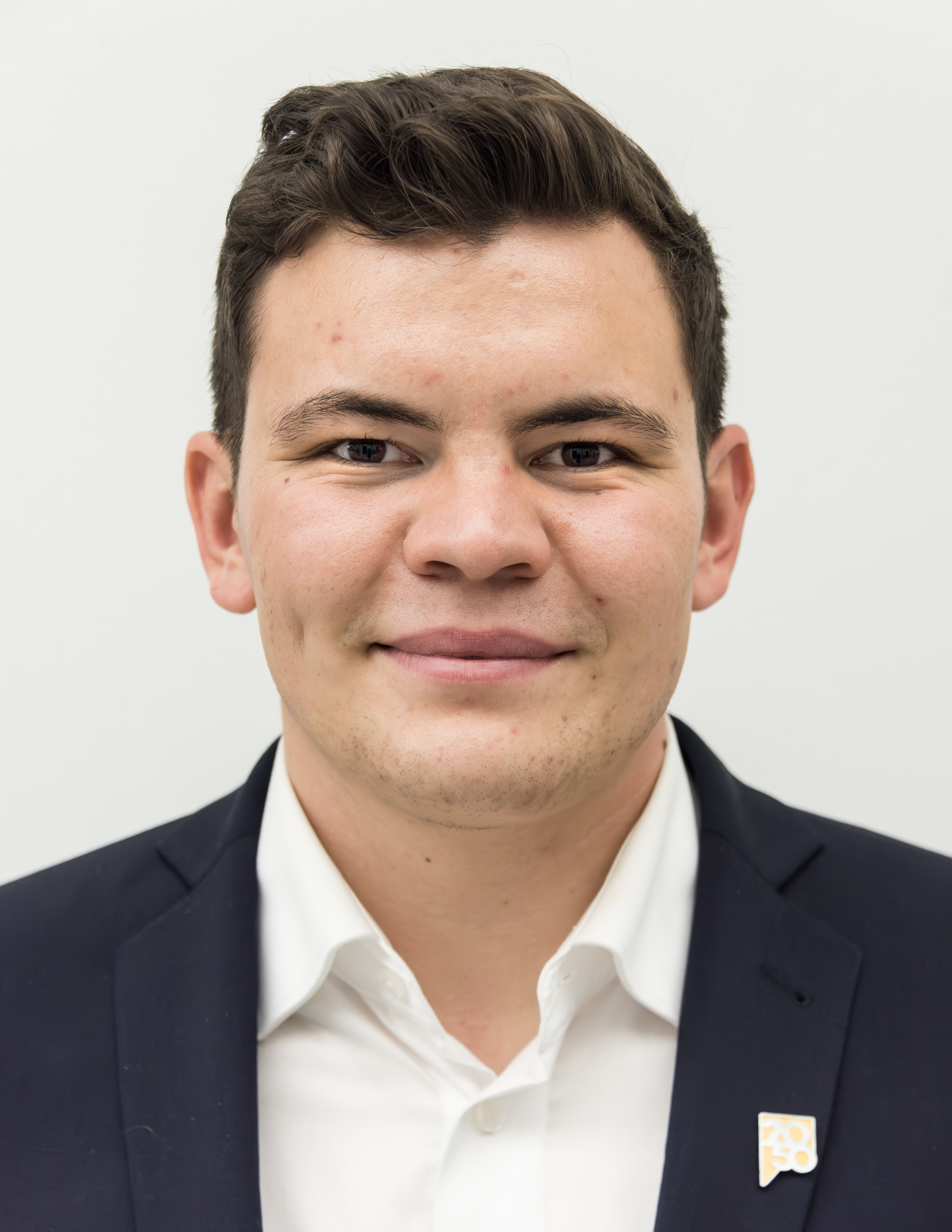
- Gomoła in 2023

Member of the Sejm
- Incumbent
- Assumed office 13 November 2023
- Constituency: Opole

Personal details
- Born: 20 January 1999 (age 27)
- Party: Poland 2050 (2021–2024, since 2025)
- Relatives: Jan Gomoła (great-great-grandfather); Franciszek Gomoła (great-great-great-grandfather)

Adam Michał Gomoła (born 20 January 1999) is a Polish politician serving as a member of the Sejm since 2023. He is the youngest member of the 10th Sejm.

== Controversies ==
In March 2024 Nowa Trybuna Opolska released Gomoła's private conversation with a local activist, in which he tried to persuade the latter to transfer 20,000 złoty to a private company to illegally finance the Poland 2050's campaign in 2024 Opolskie local elections. In response to that, Poland 2050's leadership kicked out Gomoła from the party and its parliamentary club, but he returned in 2025
