= German Minority Electoral Committee =

Minority committee in Poland

German Minority Electoral Committee Komitet Wyborczy Mniejszość Niemiecka Wahlkommittee Deutsche Minderheit
- Leader: Ryszard Galla
- Founded: 1990
- Headquarters: 6 Konopnickiej Street, 45-004, Opole; 3 Wczasowa Street, 47-400, Racibórz
- Ideology: German minority interests; Regionalism Christian democracy Social market economy
- Political position: Centre
- European affiliation: European People's Party (Congress)
- Colours: Blue
- Sejm: 0 / 460
- Voivodeship Sejmik of Opole Voivodeship: 5 / 30
- Powiat Councils in Opole: 36 / 219
- Gmina Councils in Opole: 178 / 1,139
- Mayors in Opole: 12 / 71

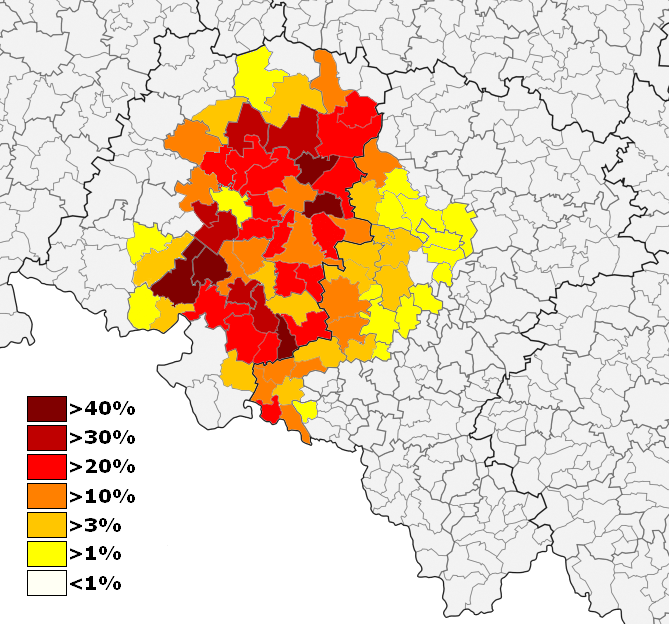
German Minority in the Polish region of Upper Silesia (Opole Voivodeship and Silesian Voivodeship).

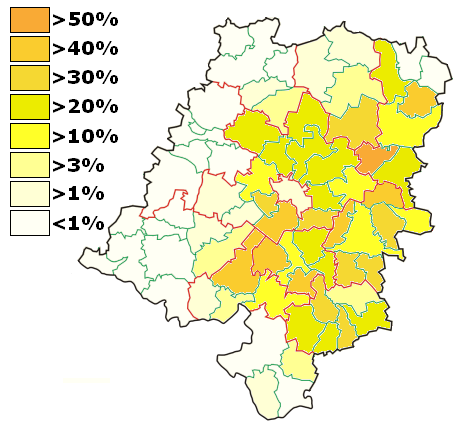
Votes for the German Minority in the 2007 elections, Opole Voivodeship.

The German Minority Electoral Committee (Polish: Komitet Wyborczy Mniejszość Niemiecka, German: Wahlkomitee Deutsche Minderheit) is an electoral committee in Poland which represents the German minority. From 2005 to 2023 the party had been represented in the Sejm by Ryszard Galla who has been leader of the party since 2008.

It is not a registered political party, but an organization by which Poland's political system gives political representation to national minorities. Candidates of the German minority are proposed by the Social-Cultural Association of Germans in Opolitian Silesia (Polish: Towarzystwo Społeczno-Kulturalne Niemców na Śląsku Opolskim, German: Wahlkomitee Sozial-Kulturelle Gesellschaft der Deutschen im Oppelner Schlesien) and the Social-Cultural Association of Germans in Silesian Voivodeship (Towarzystwo Społeczno-Kulturalne Niemców Województwa Śląskiego).

== Background ==
There is a significant German minority in Upper Silesia, which trace their history back to when the area was a part of Germany or its predecessor states from the late Middle Ages until the 1940s, and there are 19 counties of Opole Voivodeship where Germans make up more than 20% of the population. Germans are the largest minority group in Poland — according to the 2002 census, there were 152,897 Germans in Poland, and almost all of them (140 000) were located in Upper Silesia. The German minority in Poland is also overwhelmingly rural (70%) and Roman Catholic (90%). While homogenous culturally, the German society is facing significant political divisions, as well as declining numbers — young Polish Germans, increasingly better educated and holding German citizenship in addition to the Polish one, are leaving for more economically developed Germany in search of better living conditions. Germans in Poland also value their regional identity over the national one, which leads some of them to identify as Silesian rather than German.

After 1989, several groups aiming to represent German minority interests in Poland had emerged, but German Minority Electoral Committee became the most successful formation. The party first participated in the 1991 Polish parliamentary election, where it gained more than 132 000 valid votes nationwide, equating to 1.18 %. The party also included representatives of other Polish minorities on its lists — Lemkos, Roma, Belarusians and Karaites. In its programme, the party emphasized regulating the status of all Germans in Poland, specifically advocating for the Law on National Minorities. The party also emphasized the desire for consensual and peaceful coexistence between Germans and Poles, support for the development of a social market economy, cooperation with neighboring countries and keeping all of the communist-era social welfare programmes.

German Minority emerged as the only major minority electoral committee running in Polish parliamentary elections since 1991. It is characterized by strong regionalism, with the problems of the Opole region and its population forming the basis of the committee's programme. One of the main goals of the party is the propagation, popularization, and development of German education, culture, art, and language in Poland. In addition, German Minority advocates for real social acceptance of multiculturalism and respecting and realizing the rights of national minorities, especially in education. Economically, the party states its commitment to welfare state and an economy based on Christian values, giving special importance to values of solidarity and justice. An important element in the functioning of the state according to the German Minority was integration into the European Union and the development of Polish-German cooperation - as such, the party supported Polish entrance in the European Union.

Małgorzata Wojtaszczyk compared German Minority to agrarian Self-Defence of the Republic of Poland and Polish People's Party, which "could become a representation of the German population" in addition to German Minority. Wojtaszczyk found that the performance of Polish People's Party was particularly weak in areas with significant German minority, concluding that German Minority is ideologically similar to that party, with the main difference being that German Minority appeals specifically to the interests of German population, while PSL promotes purely Polish slogans. However, the electorate of German Minority mainly consists of older people, with many young Germans in Poland either emigrating or voting for Polish parties.

== Programme ==
German Minority supports Polish integration with the European Union and the development of the region of Silesia, and argues for laws supportive of minority groups (in particular, the German minority in Poland). The party describes itself as based on Christian values, writing: "The community of the German Minority is made up of people with Christian roots, so our activities are based on Christian values. Through its activity based on Christian democratic values, the German minority seeks to bring about a strengthening of such fundamental values as freedom, solidarity and justice."

German Minority puts heavy emphasis on solidarity and corporatism in its program, stressing the importance of fostering a community in contrast to individualism. The party stresses that while everyone has the right to coexist, one "is also obliged to be in solidarity" and that "there is no freedom without justice". As such, the party believes that Poland has an obligation to uphold equal rights for all, particularly caring for the needs of weak and small social groups. According to German Minority, the solidarity of the German community in Silesia can be preserved through cultivating and upholding its tradition, especially the Silesian German language. In addition, the party calls for a great decentralisation of Poland and empowerment of the local governments, especially in the regards to finances; German Minority calls for local authorities to be given a bigger share of revenue from corporate tax and VAT.

In regards to economy, the party calls for building a system of equal opportunities, especially for the "weakest individuals in society". To this end, German Minority wants free, state-financed kindergarten and greater financial support for family welfare institutions such as social welfare centres, family counselling centres and the church. The party believes that "the region is the right place to create health policy" and advocates for a heavily decentralised healthcare system that would focus on "equalisation of opportunities for regional operators". The party also calls for a high increase of salaries for teacher and healthcare workers, and believes that public facilities need to be modernised in order to be more accessible for the disabled and seniors. German Minority also calls for free public transportation.

In 2019, the party outlined six political issues as particularly important for the German Minority:

- Preservation of the traditions, identity and culture of Silesian Germans and guaranteeing legal and financial mechanisms for the cultivation of this heritage;
- Increasing the quality of German language teaching in Polish schools, including German as a national minority language, and supporting and developing mechanisms to support bilingual education;
- Support for young people, family values, and entrepreneurship.
- Additional privileges and development of self-government, transferring as much power as possible to the local authorities and self-governments;
- Cultivation of sustainable and balanced development Silesia in regards to the rest of Poland, especially in matters of infrastructure and health care;
- Equal treatment of women and men.

The party is placed on the center of the Polish political spectrum, centrist or right-of-centre, or otherwise as slightly left of centre, and after the 2002 Polish local elections it formed a coalition with Democratic Left Alliance. Polish political scientist Andrzej Szczepański found that the voter profile of the German Minority Electoral Committee is typical of a party of the left, particularly similar to the Democratic Left Alliance. It was also compared to Polish agrarian parties such as Samoobrona and the 2000s Polish People's Party (PSL). PSL was considered agrarian socialist and left-wing in the 2000s, although it moved to the right in late 2010s.

== National elections ==
As an organisation representing a national minority, it is not required to pass the election threshold of 5% as standard political parties in Poland are.

Election	Votes	% of Poland	% of Opole	Seats	Change
1991	132,059	1.18	26.11 (Note: Opole Voivodeship according to the 1975–1998 borders)	7 / 460	▲7
1993	60,770	0.44	18.96	3 / 460	▼4
1997	51,027	0.39	16.96	2 / 460	▼1
2001	42,340	0.36	13.62	2 / 460	Steady
2005	34,469	0.29	12.92	2 / 460	Steady
2007	32,462	0.20	8.81	1 / 460	▼1
2011	28,014	0.19	8.76	1 / 460	Steady
2015	27,530	0.18	8.14	1 / 460	Steady
2019	32,094	0.17	7.90	1 / 460	Steady
2023	25,778	0.12	5.37	0 / 460	▼1

In 1993, there were two lists, one in the Opole Voivodeship, one in the Katowice Voivodeship. The Opole list also won one seat in the Senate.

At the 2007 Parliamentary elections, the candidate list to the Sejm (Polish parliament) got 8.81% of the votes in Opole Voivodeship, and only one seat in the Sejm, Ryszard Galla (8,193 votes). He had already won a seat in 2005 and had announced the rise from 2 to 3 seats as an electoral goal early in September, thanks to the personal votes of local mayors who were supposed to reinforce the list. The second former Sejm deputy, Henryk Kroll (7,897 votes), lost his seat and announced his resignation from the chairmanship of the Social-Cultural Association of Germans in Silesian Opole, whose delegates are due to elect a new president early 2008. The 3 candidate list for the Senate of Poland didn't succeed in winning a single seat. According to the bilingual weekly Schlesisches Wochenblatt, votes won by the German Minority list could have benefited the Civic Platform (PO), for whom 6,000 to 8,000 ethnic Germans would have voted.

In 2011, the list got 8.76% of valid votes in the Opole constituency, and more than 20% in three powiat (Krapkowice County, Opole County and Strzelce County) out of 12. Ryszard Galla was reelected as the sole MP from the German Minority with 11,794 personal votes.

In 2023, the list got 5.37% of valid votes in the Opole constituency and for the first time won no seats. This means that for the first time since 1990, the German minority had no political representation in the Polish Sejm. Following the loss of their single seat, German Minority wrote a statement: "Despite the loss of our representative in the Polish Parliament, we firmly believe that the change that has taken place in the proportions of votes in the Sejm will bring about a democratisation of social life, an improvement in many fundamental pillars of the state and a return to elementary social dialogue." Political commentators attributed the loss of German seat to declining German population in Poland, "brutal atmosphere" of the campaign, and the very high turnout.

== Regional elections ==
Local elections to the Opole Regional Assembly:

Year	Votes	%	Seats
1998	67,921	21.15 (#2)	13 / 45
2002	54,385	18.61 (#2)	7 / 30
2006	49,131	17.30 (#3)	7 / 30
2010	53,670	17.77 (#2)	6 / 30
2014	41,889	14.90 (#3)	7 / 30
2018	52,431	14.64 (#3)	5 / 30
2024	53,338	16.22 (#3)	5 / 30

== Bibliography ==
- Rabagliati, Alastair (2001). A Minority Vote. Participation of the German and Belarusian Minorities within the Polish Political System 1989–1999. Kraków: Zakład Wydawniczy NOMOS. ISBN 83-88508-18-0.
