= Ryszard Wilk =

Polish politician

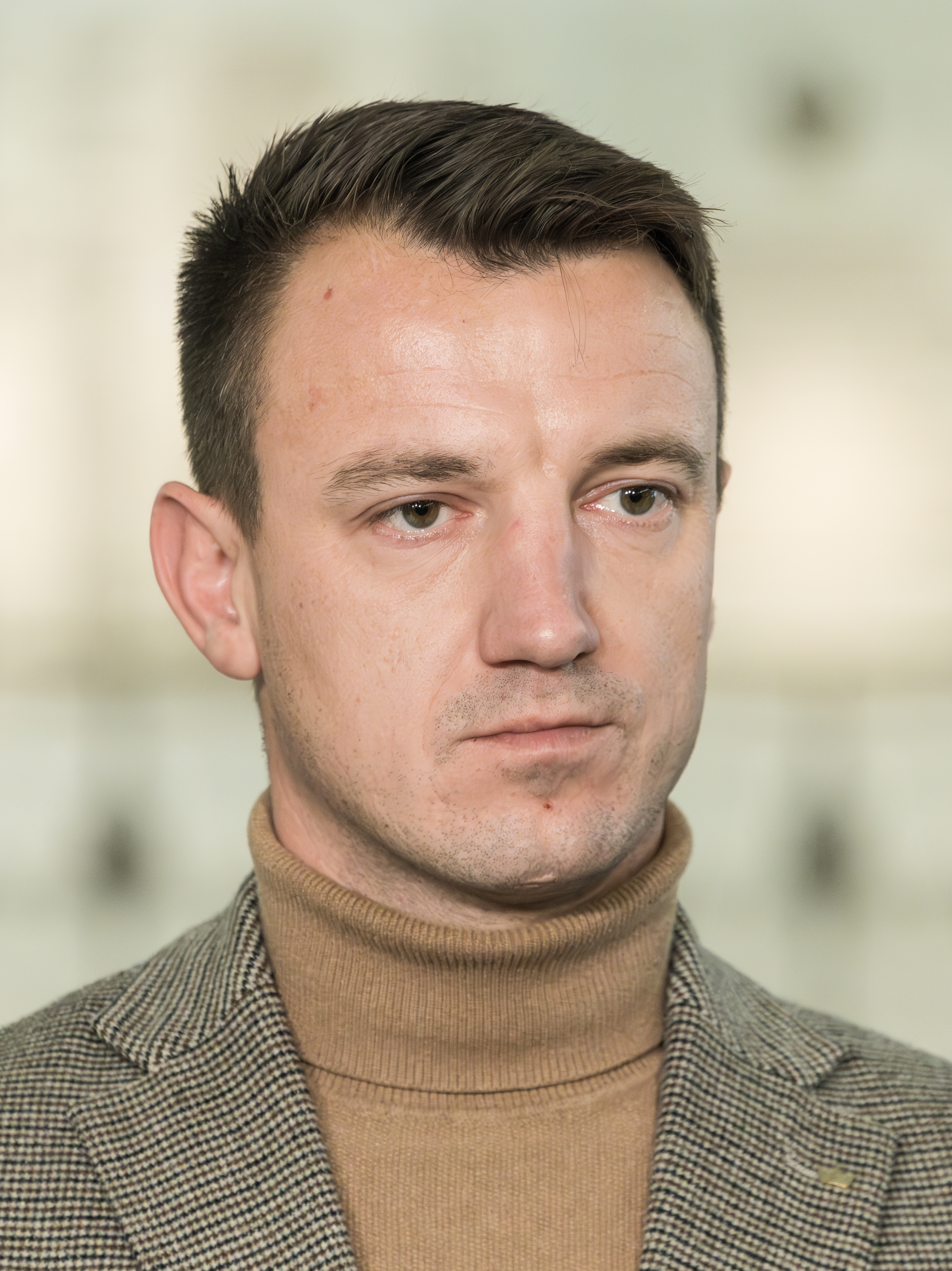
- Wilk in 2023

Member of the Sejm
- Incumbent
- Assumed office 13 November 2023
- Constituency: No. 14 (Nowy Sącz)

Personal details
- Born: 24 March 1987 (age 39) Krynica, Poland
- Party: New Hope
- Spouse: Martyna Wilk
- Children: 3
- Education: Agricultural University of Kraków

Ryszard Wilk (born 24 March 1987) is a Polish politician, entrepreneur and lifeguard, he serves as a member of the 10th term Sejm.

== Biography ==
Wilk was born on 24 March 1987 in Krynica. In 2015 he graduated with bachelor of engineering degree in geodesy and cartography from the Agricultural University of Kraków.

=== Political career ===
He has been a member of the New Hope party since 2016.

Wilk ran for an MP twice. For the first time and without success in 2019. He won 2778 votes, which did not give him a chance for a seat in the Sejm.

In the 2023 elections, thanks to the support of 19374 people, he became a member of the 10th term Sejm.

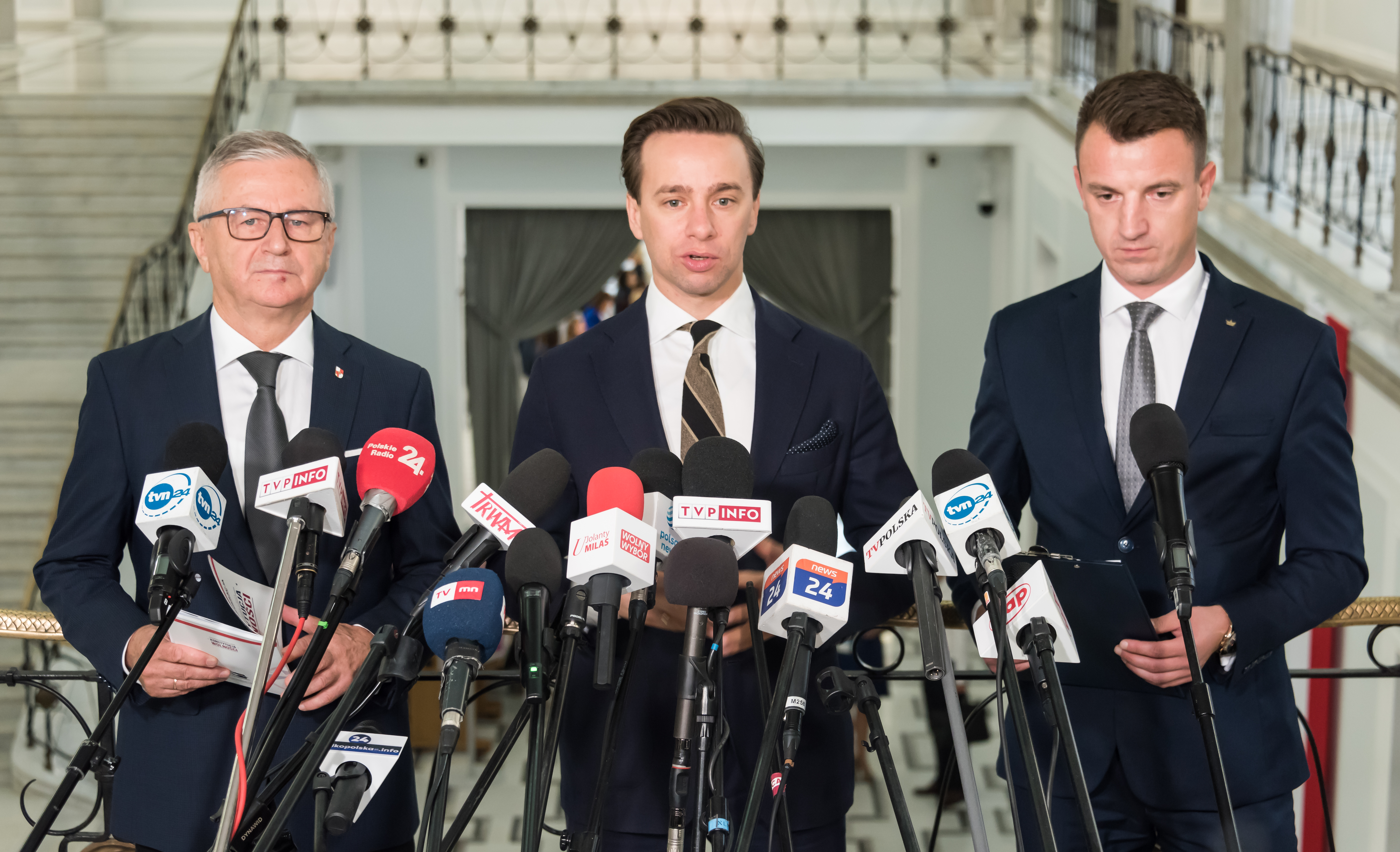
MPs Włodzimierz Skalik, Krzysztof Bosak and Ryszard Wilk during a press conference

== Personal life ==
Wilk is married to Martyna Wilk. They have three children.
