= Sejm Constituency no. 21 =

Parliamentary constituency in Poland

Sejm Constituency no. 21 Opole
- Okręg wyborczy nr 21; Opole
- Constituency for the Sejm
- Location within Poland.
- Voivodeship: Opole
- Population: 942,441 (June 2023)
- Electorate: 737,189 (2023)
- Area: 9,411.6 km^{2} (3,633.8 sq mi)

Current constituency
- Created: 2001
- Deputies: 12
- Regional assembly: Opole Voivodeship Sejmik
- Senate constituencies: 51, 52 and 53
- EP constituency: Lower Silesian and Opole

Sejm Constituency no. 21 (Polish: Okręg wyborczy nr 21) is a constituency of the Sejm electing twelve deputies. It consists of entire Opole Voivodeship. Constituency Electoral Commission's seat is voivodeship's capital, city of Opole.

== List of deputies ==
Deputies for the 10th Sejm (2023–2027)
Deputy	Party	Parliamentary group
Danuta Jazłowiecka	Civic Platform	Civic Coalition
Tomasz Kostuś	Civic Platform	Civic Coalition
Paweł Masełko	Civic Platform	Civic Coalition
Tomasz Siemoniak	Civic Platform	Civic Coalition
Witold Zembaczyński	Modern	Civic Coalition
Katarzyna Czochara	Law and Justice	Law and Justice
Janusz Kowalski	Sovereign Poland	Law and Justice
Marcin Ociepa	Independent	Law and Justice
Adam Gomoła	Poland 2050	Poland 2050
Paweł Kukiz	Independent	Kukiz'15
Włodzimierz Skalik	Confederation of the Polish Crown	Confederation
Marcelina Zawisza	Left Together	The Left
Former members of the current term
Rajmund Miller (Note: Died 26 March 2024.)	Civic Platform	Civic Coalition

== Election results ==
=== 2023 ===
2023 parliamentary election: Opole
Electoral committee	Votes	%	Seats
Civic Coalition	161,241	33.59	5
Law and Justice	150,022	31.26	4
Third Way	61,155	12.74	1
The Left	34,763	7.24	1
Confederation	31,150	6.49	1
German Minority	25,778	5.37	–
There is One Poland	8,338	1.74	–
Nonpartisan Local Government Activists	7,521	1.57	–
Total	479,968	100.00	12
Valid votes	479,968	97.83	
Invalid/blank votes	10,662	2.17	
Total votes	490,630	100.00	
Registered voters/turnout	737,189	66.55	
Source: National Electoral Commission
