= Now Wielkopolska =

2014 electoral alliance in Poland

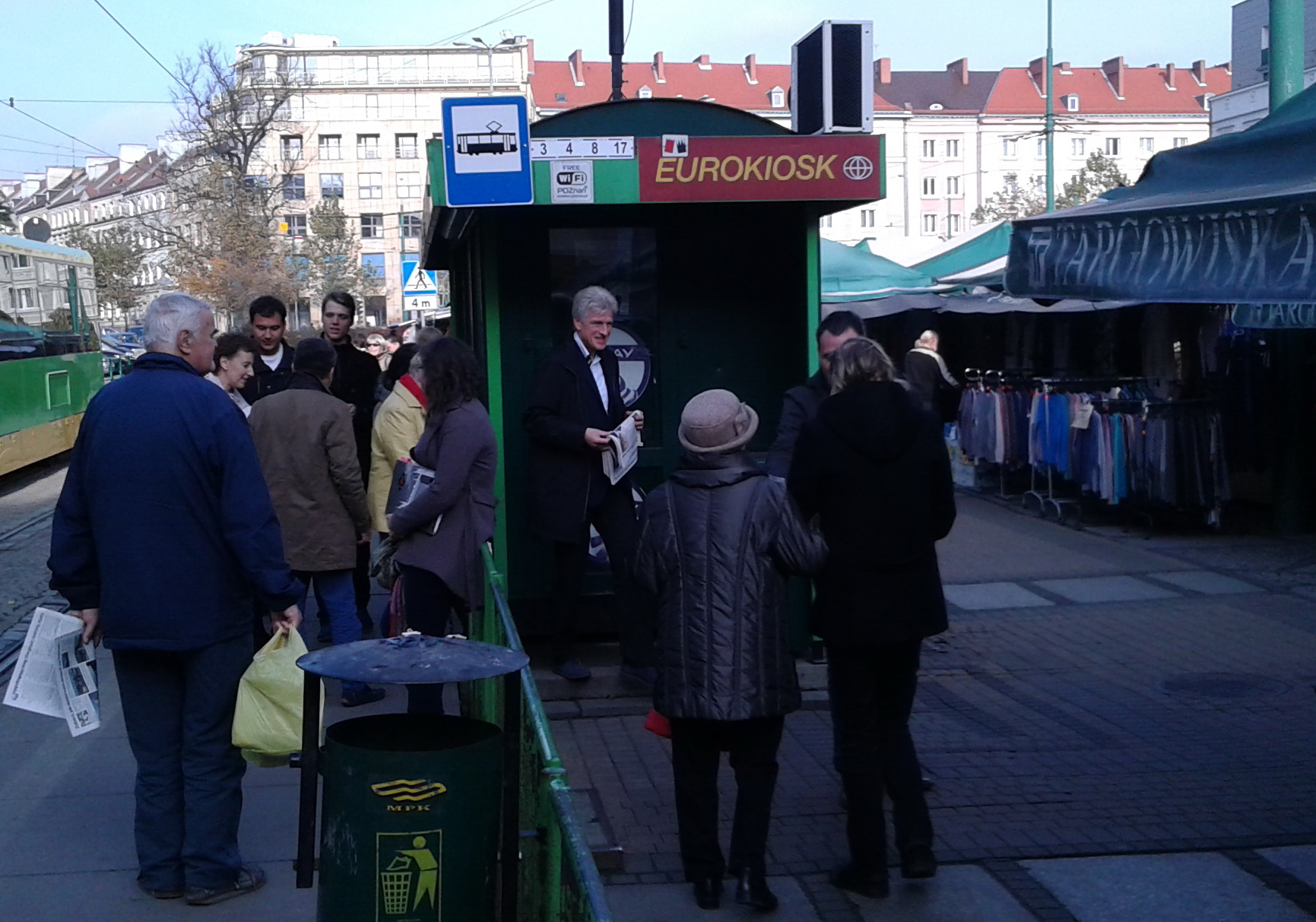
Candidates of Now Wielkopolska campaigning in the 2014 local elections, with Ryszard Grobelny in the middle.

Now Wielkopolska was an electoral committee created by President of Poznań Ryszard Grobelny for the 2014 Polish local elections.

In elections to the voivodeship sejmik, Now Wielkopolska gained 7.54% of the vote, coming fifth with two seats. One seat was won by the party founder, who assumed the office, as he was not victorious for re-election for President of Poznań. The other seat was won by Katarzyna Bujakiewicz, however in January 2015 she resigned, and was replaced by Mirosław Kruszyński.

In the elections for the city council of Poznań, the committee won 3 seats. They were earned by Dariusz Jaworski, Tomasz Kayser and Joanna Frankiewicz, who founded the Poznań Citizens' Movement association circle in the city council (similarly to 2011, elected from the Ryszard Grobelny Electors' Electoral Committee). They cooperated with PiS and SLD, ruling along with them. Grobelny came first in the first round of the election for President of Poznań with 28.58% of the vote, but in the second he lost to PO candidate Jacek Jaśkowiak, earning 40.91% of the vote.

In the 2018 Polish local elections, the Now Wielkopolska committee was not reestablished. In elections to the city council, its members started from the lists of Jarosław Pucek "Good of the City" Electors' Electoral Committee, which did not earn seats despite crossing the electoral threshold, and Jarosław Pucek coming fifth out of seven candidates for President of Poznań, earning 6.54% of the vote. In elections to the sejmik, its members started on the lists of Bezpartyjni Samorządowcy, which earned one seat for Jerzy Lechnerowski.
