= 2007 Polish parliamentary election =

- 21 October 2007
- Opinion polls
- Registered: 30,615,471
- Sejm

All 460 seats in the Sejm 231 seats needed for a majority
- Turnout: 16,477,734 (53.82%) ▲13.25 pp
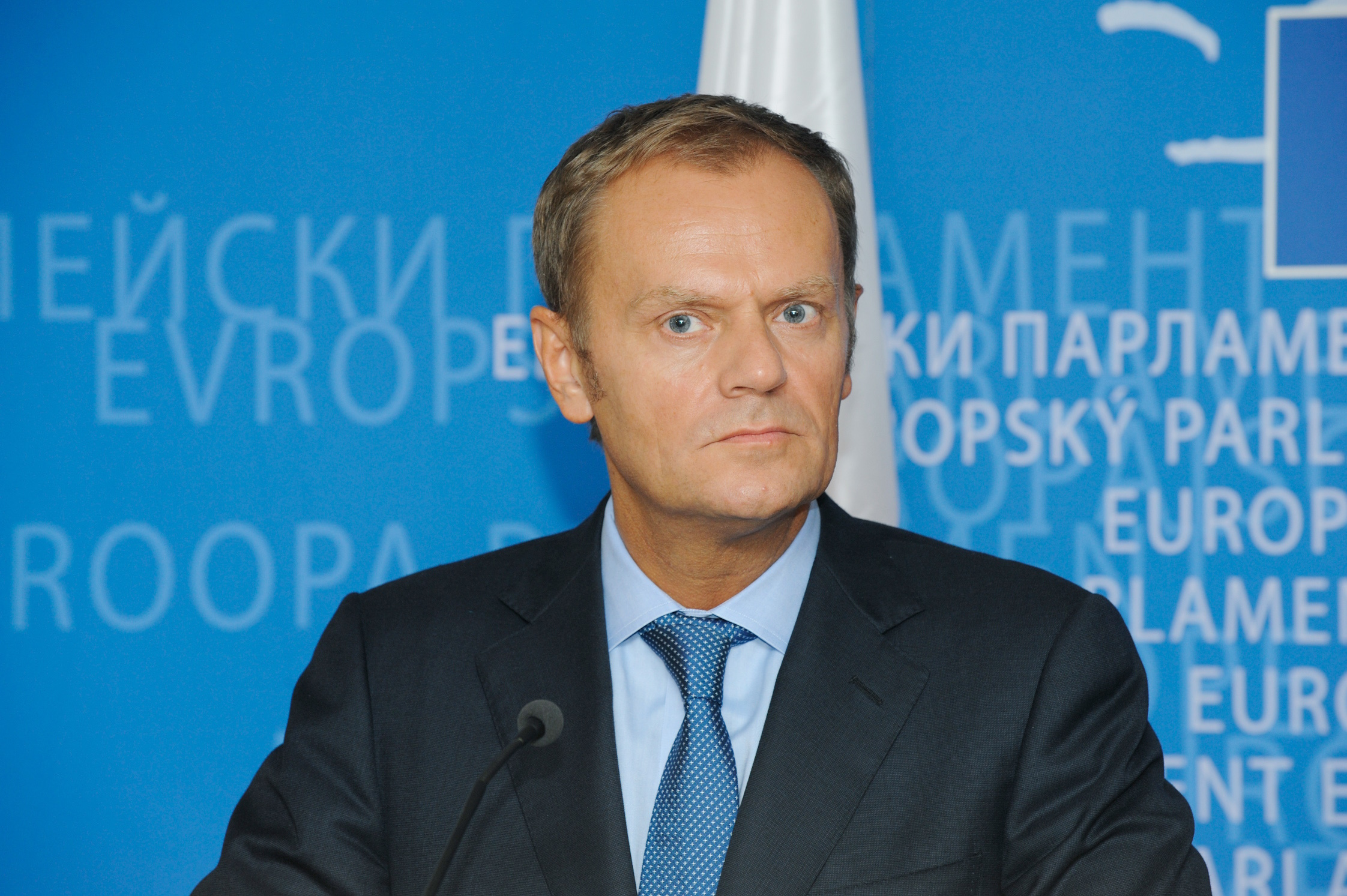

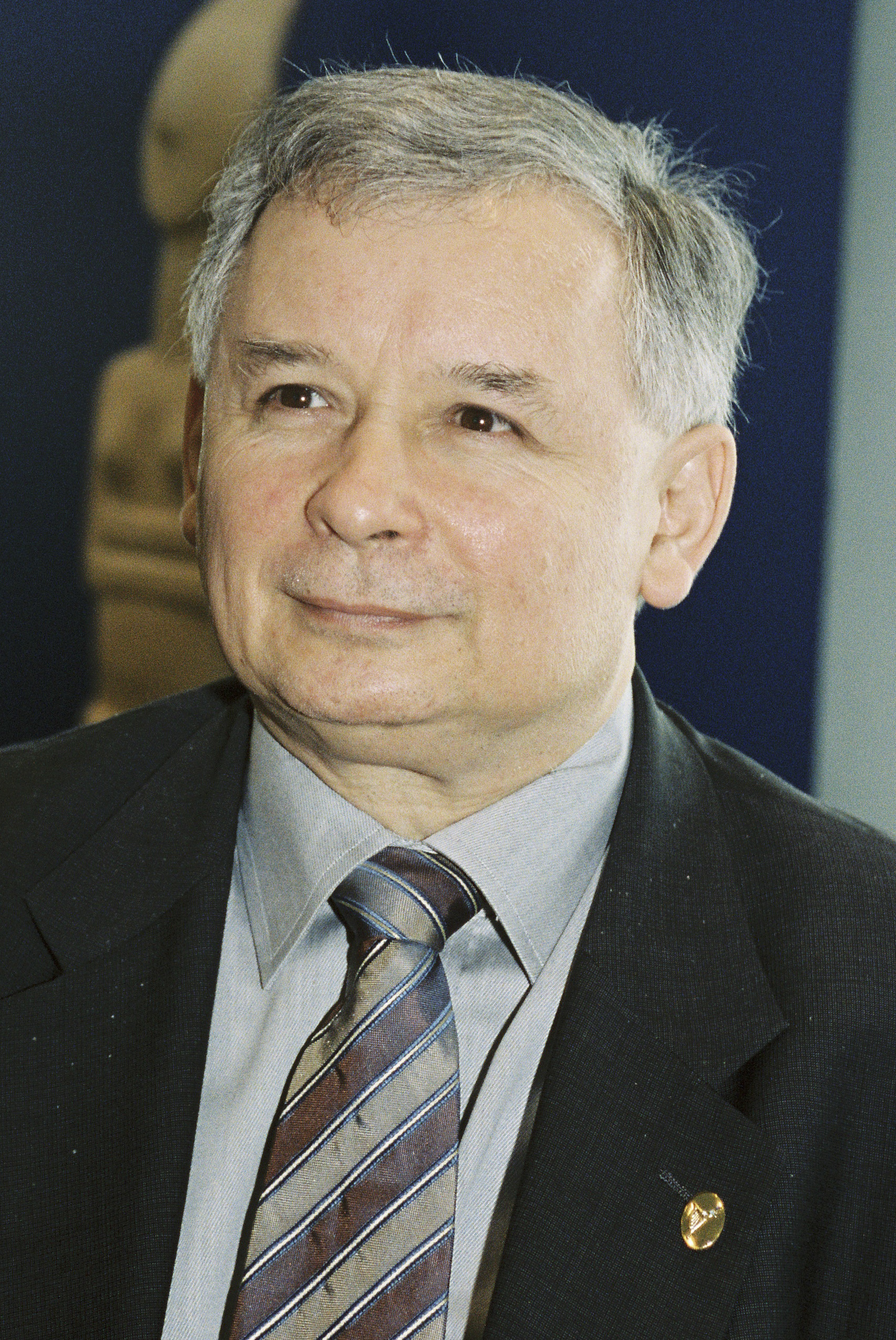

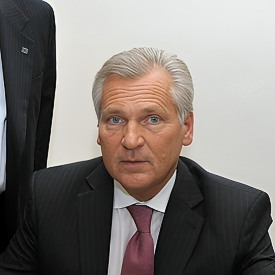

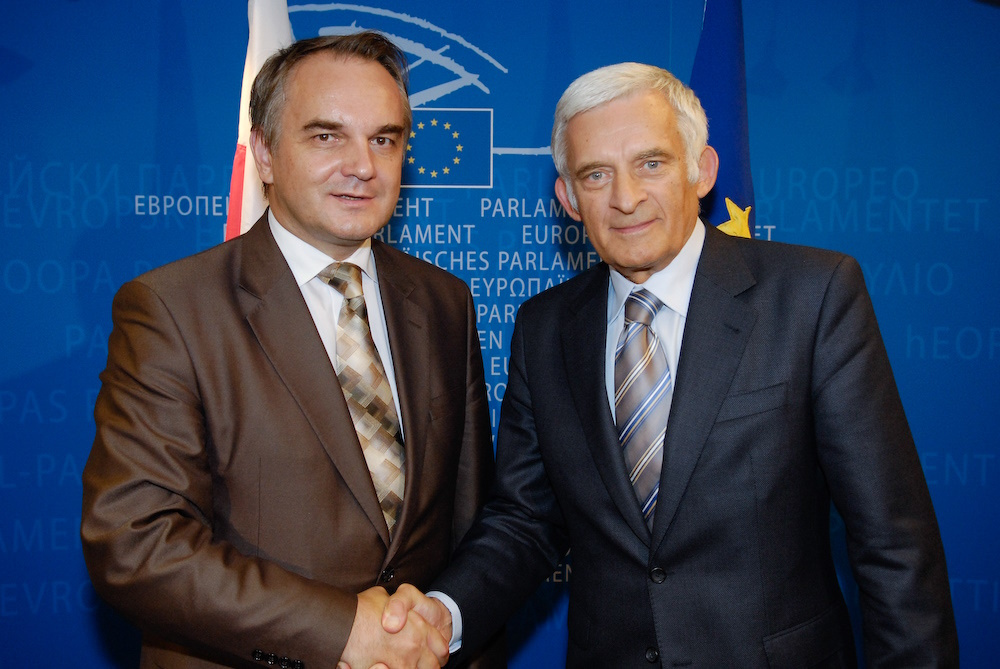

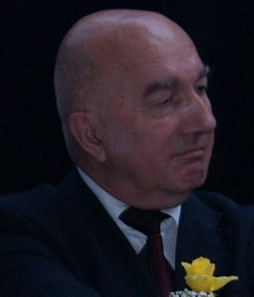
	Majority party	Minority party	Third party
Leader	Donald Tusk	Jarosław Kaczyński	Aleksander Kwaśniewski
Party	PO	PiS	LiD
Leader since	1 June 2003	18 January 2003	3 September 2006
Last election	24.1%, 133 seats	27.0%, 155 seats	17.6%, 55 seats (Note: Aggregate results for Democratic Left Alliance (11.3%, 55 seats), Social Democracy of Poland (3.9%, 0 seats) and Democratic Party (2.5%, 0 seats).)
Seats won	209	166	53
Seat change	▲76	▲11	▼2
Popular vote	6,701,010	5,183,477	2,122,981
Percentage	41.5%	32.1%	13.2%
Swing	▲17.4 pp	▲5.1 pp	▼4.4 pp
	Fourth party	Fifth party
Leader	Waldemar Pawlak	Henryk Kroll
Party	PSL	KWMN
Leader since	29 January 2005	23 March 1991
Last election	7.0%, 25 seats	0.3%, 2 seats
Seats won	31	1
Seat change	▲6	▼1
Popular vote	1,437,638	28,014
Percentage	8.9%	0.2%
Swing	▲1.9 pp	▼0.1 pp
- Senate
- All 100 seats in the Senate; 51 seats needed for a majority
- Turnout: 16,475,672 (53.81%) ▲13.32 pp
Party	Vote %	Seats	+/–
PO	39.14	60	+26
PiS	31.38	39	−10
Independent	3.64	1	−4
This lists parties that won seats. See the complete results below.

Government before	Government after election
Kaczyński cabinet PiS	First Tusk cabinet PO—PSL

Parliamentary elections were held in Poland on 21 October 2007. All 460 members of the Sejm and 100 senators of the Senate were elected. The largest opposition group, Civic Platform (PO), soundly defeated the ruling Law and Justice (PiS) party and its allies. Throughout the campaign, polls showed conflicting results as to which of the two parties had the greater support, yet by the closing week the polls had swung in favour of Civic Platform. Three other political groups won the election into the Sejm, the centre-left Left and Democrats coalition, the agrarian Polish People's Party, and the tiny German Minority group. Law and Justice's former minor coalition partners, the League of Polish Families and the Self-Defense of the Republic of Poland suffered an enormous voter backlash, failing to cross the 5% electoral threshold in order to enter the Sejm. Consequently, both parties lost all of their seats.

Early elections were called after the Sejm voted for its dissolution, due to serious allegations of massive corruption on the part of Andrzej Lepper, leader of the Self-Defense of the Republic of Poland, whose party served as a junior coalition partner to the government of Prime Minister Jarosław Kaczyński. All 460 seats in the Sejm and all 100 seats in the Senate were up for election.

Prime Minister and PiS leader Jarosław Kaczyński stepped down from office on 15 November, with Civic Platform leader Donald Tusk sworn in as Poland's Prime Minister the following day. Civic Platform consequently formed a coalition majority government with the Polish People's Party.

The turnout for the elections was 54%, an increase of 13 pp from the 2005 elections, seeing the highest voter turnout in a Polish parliamentary election since the semi-free elections of 1989.

== Contesting parties ==
Only seven parties contested all 41 electoral districts for the Sejm nationwide. They included:

- Law and Justice (PiS)
- Civic Platform (PO)
- Left and Democrats (LiD)
- Polish People's Party (PSL)
- League of Polish Families (LPR)
- Self-Defense of the Republic of Poland (SRP)
- Polish Labour Party (PPP)

Three other parties managed to register in at least one district:

- Women's Party (PK) — 7 districts;
- Patriotic Self-Defence (SOP) — one district;
- German Minority (MN) — one district;

On 26 September 2007, the leader of the National Party of Retirees and Pensioners, Tomasz Mamiński announced his party's withdrawal from the campaign, stating that Polish electoral law and media bias discriminate against smaller parties.

Although only the ten parties mentioned above openly contested elections to the lower house Sejm, there were other groups which entered the race for the Sejm. It is common practice in Polish elections for many smaller parties to register their candidates on the electoral committee lists of the larger parties contesting the election. These included:

- LPR's lists include members of the League of Polish Families, Real Politics Union and Right of the Republic;
- PiS's lists included members of the Polish People's Party "Piast", National People's Movement, Patriotic Movement, Centre Party and Christian-National Union;
- The SRP's lists include candidates from Piotr Ikonowicz's New Left party, Leszek Miller's Polish Left party and Zygmunt Wrzodak's National Congress of Poland;
- LiD's lists include members from Democratic Left Alliance, Social Democracy of Poland, Democratic Party - demokraci.pl, Labour Union, Reason of the Polish Left, Democratic Left Party and Polish Socialist Party;
- The PPP lists include members of the Communist Party of Poland, Union of the Left, Polish Socialist Party, Reason of the Polish Left, Movement for Unemployed Protection and National Forum of Retirees and Pensioners.

29 political groupings and independents contested the elections to the Senate.

The Greens registered in one district to the Senate (Katowice), receiving 4.55% of votes.

== Opinion polls ==
Graphical summary of opinion polls: Civic Platform Law and Justice Left and Democrats Polish People's Party Self-Defence League of Polish Families Democratic Left Alliance (Note: Contested election under the Left and Democrats (Polish: Lewica i Demokraci) alliance.) Social Democracy Democratic Party

== Results ==
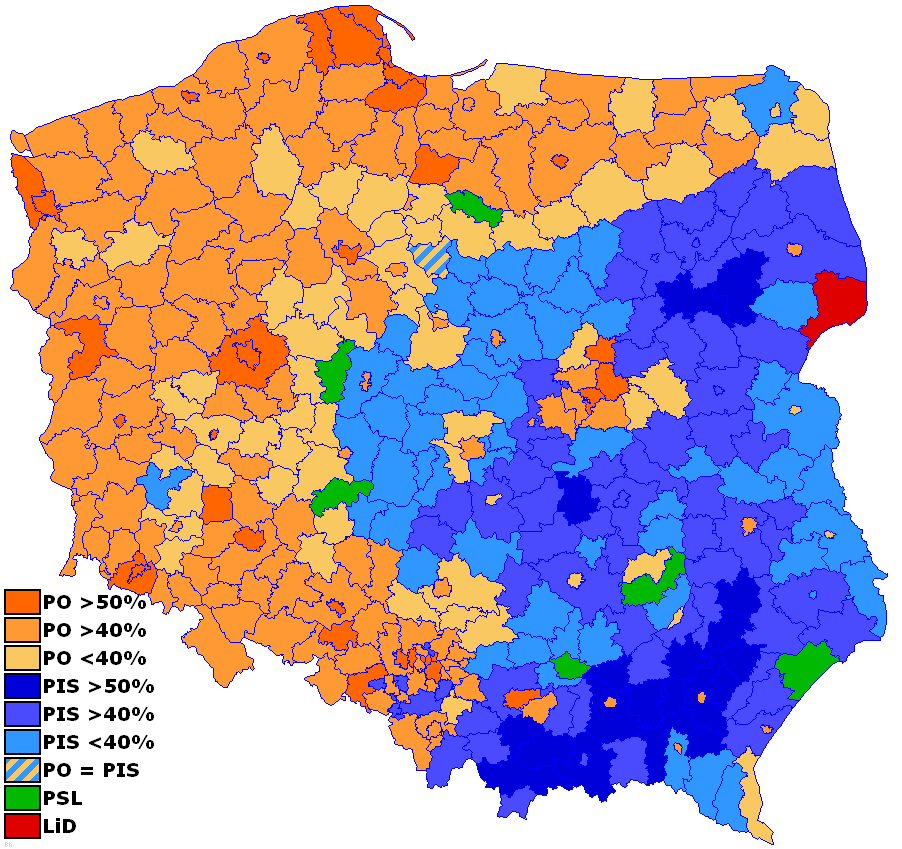
Powiats won by ■ – Civic Platform ■ – Law and Justice ■ – Polish People's Party ■ – Left and Democrats

=== Sejm ===
Party	Votes	%	Seats	+/–
Civic Platform	6,701,010	41.51	209	+76
Law and Justice	5,183,477	32.11	166	+11
Left and Democrats	2,122,981	13.15	53	–2
Polish People's Party	1,437,638	8.91	31	+6
Self-Defence of the Republic of Poland	247,335	1.53	0	–56
League of Polish Families	209,171	1.30	0	–34
Polish Labour Party	160,476	0.99	0	0
Women's Party	45,121	0.28	0	New
German Minority Electoral Committee	32,462	0.20	1	–1
Patriotic Self-Defence	2,531	0.02	0	New
Total	16,142,202	100.00	460	0
Valid votes	16,142,202	97.96		
Invalid/blank votes	335,532	2.04		
Total votes	16,477,734	100.00		
Registered voters/turnout	30,615,471	53.82		
Source: Nohlen & Stöver

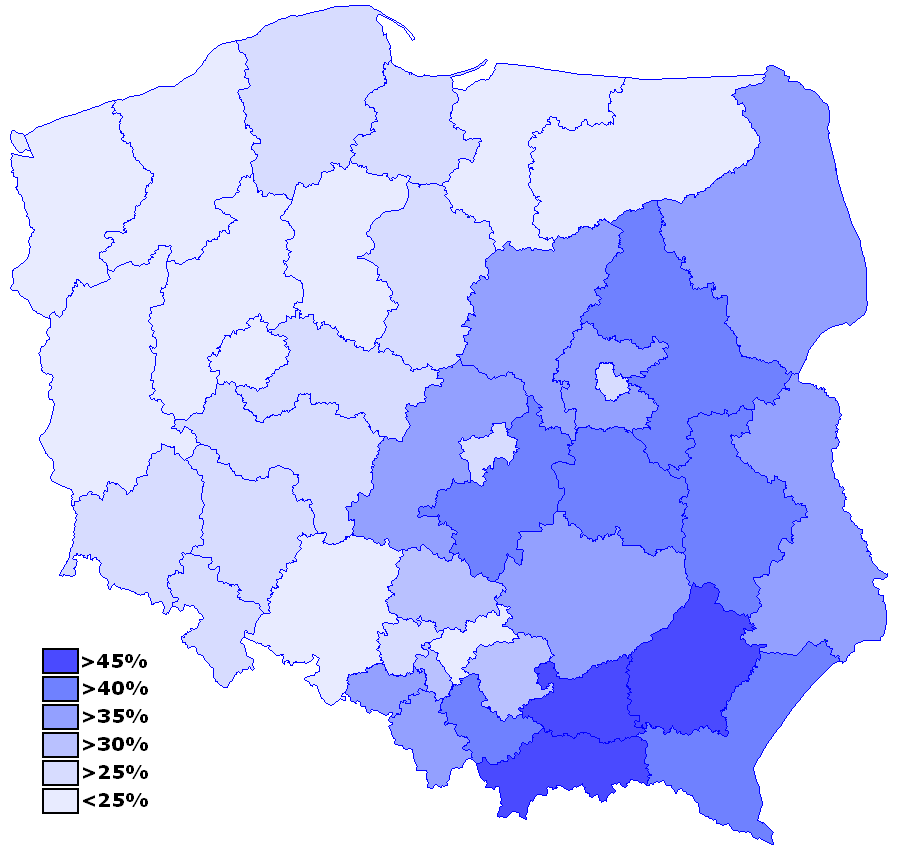
Law and Justice's main support (dark blue).

==== By constituency ====
Constituency	Turnout	PO	PiS	LiD	PSL	SRP	LPR	PPP	MN	Others	Lead
1 – Legnica	51.32	42.97	28.96	17.89	6.60	1.49	1.12	0.97	-	0.00	14.01
2 – Wałbrzych	48.91	46.39	26.23	15.73	7.76	1.59	1.04	1.25	-	0.00	20.16
3 – Wrocław	58.18	53.20	28.40	10.39	4.84	1.12	1.20	0.84	-	0.00	24.80
4 – Bydgoszcz	53.26	44.09	24.21	19.01	8.71	1.71	1.07	1.20	-	0.00	19.88
5 – Toruń	48.13	39.27	26.75	18.34	11.36	2.34	0.88	1.07	-	0.00	12.52
6 – Lublin	53.05	29.47	41.52	10.59	12.55	1.76	1.91	0.78	-	1.42	12.05
7 – Chełm	46.23	24.09	39.51	10.50	19.38	3.30	2.10	1.12	-	0.00	15.42
8 – Zielona Góra	50.35	47.06	22.47	17.64	8.39	1.69	1.44	1.32	-	0.00	24.59
9 – Łódź	61.98	45.68	27.85	17.77	3.64	1.45	1.13	0.76	-	1.72	17.83
10 – Piotrków Trybunalski	50.66	27.92	41.42	12.35	13.66	2.27	1.26	1.11	-	0.00	13.50
11 – Sieradz	49.46	30.46	35.14	14.03	14.05	2.71	1.22	0.92	-	1.47	4.68
12 – Chrzanów	54.73	36.43	40.40	10.70	9.01	0.97	1.52	0.98	-	0.00	3.97
13 – Kraków	61.38	47.35	34.43	9.67	4.18	0.62	1.22	1.67	-	0.86	12.92
14 – Nowy Sącz	52.27	28.76	51.35	6.40	10.28	1.23	1.32	0.67	-	0.00	22.59
15 – Tarnów	52.26	32.22	45.64	7.33	11.23	1.15	1.56	0.87	-	0.00	13.42
16 – Płock	47.05	29.54	35.58	11.25	19.82	1.93	0.99	0.88	-	0.00	6.04
17 – Radom	50.56	28.24	42.72	8.94	15.02	2.66	1.49	0.93	-	0.00	14.48
18 – Siedlce	50.51	24.83	42.93	8.36	18.96	2.36	1.78	0.77	-	0.00	18.10
19 – Warsaw I	74.03	54.01	27.66	12.66	2.33	0.40	1.24	0.48	-	1.22	26.35
20 – Warsaw II	61.83	45.17	35.63	7.93	8.26	0.79	1.41	0.81	-	0.00	9.54
21 – Opole	45.53	46.58	22.87	11.19	6.62	1.74	1.28	0.91	8.81	0.00	23.71
22 – Krosno	41.10	29.30	44.19	9.21	12.96	1.81	1.49	1.05	-	0.00	14.89
23 – Rzeszów	44.24	27.81	48.43	8.78	11.16	1.09	1.84	0.89	-	0.00	20.62
24 – Białystok	49.50	32.36	38.81	14.72	9.14	2.02	1.44	0.61	-	0.90	6.45
25 – Gdańsk	58.34	54.62	27.08	10.59	4.38	1.19	1.34	0.81	-	0.00	27.54
26 – Gdynia	56.80	51.03	26.55	12.45	6.12	1.37	1.56	0.93	-	0.00	24.48
27 – Bielsko-Biała	58.84	41.76	35.41	12.81	6.62	0.91	1.14	1.34	-	0.00	6.35
28 – Częstochowa	52.94	40.12	30.88	14.76	9.79	1.53	1.55	1.36	-	0.00	9.24
29 – Gliwice	50.96	49.69	29.62	13.26	4.63	0.82	0.97	1.01	-	0.00	20.07
30 – Rybnik	53.01	44.55	36.23	11.99	3.98	0.95	1.01	1.29	-	0.00	8.32
31 – Katowice	57.45	49.74	31.52	12.26	3.31	0.59	0.97	1.62	-	0.00	18.22
32 – Sosnowiec	49.73	44.75	24.98	21.61	5.03	0.93	1.16	1.56	-	0.00	19.77
33 – Kielce	47.45	27.94	39.07	13.81	14.72	1.63	0.98	0.94	-	0.91	11.13
34 – Elbląg	46.89	43.34	24.26	15.43	11.42	3.00	1.40	1.14	-	0.00	19.08
35 – Olsztyn	48.90	45.25	24.15	14.07	12.61	1.70	1.30	0.92	-	0.00	21.10
36 – Kalisz	50.91	38.59	26.48	16.89	13.40	2.19	1.25	1.20	-	0.00	12.11
37 – Konin	50.78	34.18	29.24	17.44	13.83	2.36	1.38	1.58	-	0.00	4.94
38 – Piła	51.78	41.88	21.73	19.75	12.63	2.13	0.97	0.92	-	0.00	20.15
39 – Poznań	66.68	58.60	21.04	12.63	5.45	0.60	0.99	0.68	-	0.00	37.56
40 – Koszalin	49.15	45.88	21.57	17.58	8.58	4.24	1.04	1.12	-	0.00	24.31
41 – Szczecin	53.53	48.96	24.05	17.00	6.12	1.63	1.33	0.92	-	0.00	24.91
Poland	53.88	41.51	32.11	13.15	8.91	1.53	1.30	0.99	0.20	0.30	9.40

==== Seat distribution by constituency ====
Constituency	PO	PiS	LiD	PSL	MN	Sum
1 – Legnica	6	4	2	-	-	12
2 – Wałbrzych	5	2	1	-	-	8
3 – Wrocław	9	4	1	-	-	14
4 – Bydgoszcz	6	3	2	1	-	12
5 – Toruń	6	4	2	1	-	13
6 – Lublin	5	7	1	2	-	15
7 – Chełm	3	6	1	2	-	12
8 – Zielona Góra	6	3	2	1	-	12
9 – Łódź	5	3	2	-	-	10
10 – Piotrków Trybunalski	3	4	1	1	-	9
11 – Sieradz	4	5	1	2	-	12
12 – Chrzanów	3	4	1	-	-	8
13 – Kraków	7	5	1	-	-	13
14 – Nowy Sącz	3	5	-	1	-	9
15 – Tarnów	3	5	-	1	-	9
16 – Płock	3	4	1	2	-	10
17 – Radom	3	4	1	1	-	9
18 – Siedlce	3	6	1	2	-	12
19 – Warsaw I	11	6	2	-	-	19
20 – Warsaw II	5	4	1	1	-	11
21 – Opole	7	3	1	1	1	13
22 – Krosno	3	6	1	1	-	11
23 – Rzeszów	4	8	1	2	-	15
24 – Białystok	5	7	2	1	-	15
25 – Gdańsk	8	3	1	-	-	12
26 – Gdynia	8	4	2	-	-	14
27 – Bielsko-Biała	4	4	1	-	-	9
28 – Częstochowa	3	3	1	-	-	7
29 – Gliwice	6	3	1	-	-	10
30 – Rybnik	4	4	1	-	-	9
31 – Katowice	7	4	1	-	-	12
32 – Sosnowiec	5	2	2	-	-	9
33 – Kielce	5	7	2	2	-	16
34 – Elbląg	4	2	1	1	-	8
35 – Olsztyn	5	3	1	1	-	10
36 – Kalisz	5	3	2	2	-	12
37 – Konin	3	3	2	1	-	9
38 – Piła	4	2	2	1	-	9
39 – Poznań	7	2	1		-	10
40 – Koszalin	5	2	1	-	-	8
41 – Szczecin	8	3	2	-	-	13
Total	209	166	53	31	1	460

=== Senate ===
Party	Votes	%	Seats	+/–
Civic Platform	12,734,742	39.14	60	+26
Law and Justice	10,208,412	31.38	39	–10
Left and Democrats	4,751,281	14.60	0	0
Polish People's Party	2,863,883	8.80	0	–2
Self-Defence of the Republic of Poland	345,427	1.06	0	–3
League of Polish Families	293,289	0.90	0	–7
German Minority Electoral Committee	104,533	0.32	0	0
Patriotic Self-Defence	48,689	0.15	0	New
Local lists and independents	1,185,400	3.64	1	–4
Total	32,535,656	100.00	100	0
Valid votes	16,190,804	98.27		
Invalid/blank votes	284,868	1.73		
Total votes	16,475,672	100.00		
Registered voters/turnout	30,615,471	53.81		
Source: Nohlen & Stöver

==== By constituency ====
No.	Constituency	Total seats	Seats won		
No.	Constituency	Total seats	PO	PiS	Others
1	Legnica	3	2	1	
2	Wałbrzych	2	2		
3	Wrocław	3	3		
4	Bydgoszcz	2	2		
5	Toruń	3	3		
6	Lublin	3		3	
7	Chełm	3	1	2	
8	Zielona Góra	3	2	1	
9	Łódź	2	2		
10	Piotrków Trybunalski	2		2	
11	Sieradz	3	2	1	
12	Kraków	4	3	1	
13	Nowy Sącz	2		2	
14	Tarnów	2		2	
15	Płock	2	1	1	
16	Radom	2		2	
17	Siedlce	3		3	
18	Warsaw	4	3	1	
19	Warsaw	2	1	1	
20	Opole	3	2	1	
21	Krosno	2		2	
22	Rzeszów	3		3	
23	Białystok	3		2	1
24	Gdańsk	3	3		
25	Gydnia	3	2	1	
26	Bielsko-Biała	2	2		
27	Częstochowa	2	1	1	
28	Gliwice	2	2		
29	Rybnik	2	1	1	
30	Katowice	3	2	1	
31	Sosnowiec	2	2		
32	Kielce	3	1	2	
33	Elbląg	2	1	1	
34	Olsztyn	2	2		
35	Kalisz	3	2	1	
36	Konin	2	2		
37	Piła	2	2		
38	Poznań	2	2		
39	Koszalin	2	2		
40	Szczecin	2	2		
Total		100	60	39	1

== Aftermath ==
Consecutive postponements of the electoral silence's termination (initially planned for 8 PM) by the National Electoral Committee was widely criticized. The Organization for Security and Co-operation in Europe Election Assessment Mission stated that the elections demonstrate a democratic and pluralistic process, but challenges remain in oversight of the public media.

Prime Minister and PiS leader Jarosław Kaczyński stepped down from office on 15 November, and PO leader, Donald Tusk, was sworn in as Poland's Prime Minister the following day. The Civic Platform formed a coalition majority government with the agrarian centrist Polish People's Party.

Ryszard Galla, who became the only elected representative of the German Minority, replaced Henryk Kroll as the party's leader.
