= Sejm Constituency no. 14 =

Parliamentary constituency in Poland

Sejm Constituency no. 14 Nowy Sącz
- Okręg wyborczy nr 14; Nowy Sącz
- Constituency for the Sejm
- Location within Poland
- Counties: Nowy Sącz (city county), Gorlice, Limanowa, Nowy Sącz, Nowy Targ, Tatra.
- Voivodeship: Lesser Poland
- Electorate: 609,740 (2023)

Current constituency
- Created: 2001
- Seats: 10
- Regional assembly: Lesser Poland Voivodeship Sejmik
- Senate constituencies: No. 36 and 37
- EP constituency: Lesser Poland and Świętokrzyskie

Nowy Sącz, officially known as Constituency no. 14, is a Polish parliamentary constituency in the Lesser Poland Voivodeship. It elects ten members of the Sejm.

The seat of the constituency's electoral commission is in Nowy Sącz.

== List of deputies ==
Deputies for the 10th Sejm (2023–2027)
Deputy	Party	Parliamentary group
Arkadiusz Mularczyk	Law and Justice	Law and Justice
Ryszard Terlecki	Law and Justice	Law and Justice
Barbara Bartuś	Law and Justice	Law and Justice
Patryk Wicher	Law and Justice	Law and Justice
Edward Siarka	Sovereign Poland	Law and Justice
Andrzej Gut-Mostowy	Independent	Law and Justice
Weronika Smarduch	Civic Platform	Civic Coalition
Piotr Lachowicz	Independent	Civic Coalition
Urszula Nowogórska	Polish People's Party	Third Way
Ryszard Wilk	New Hope	Confederation

== Election results ==
=== 2023 ===
2023 parliamentary election: Nowy Sącz
Electoral committee	Votes	%	Seats
Law and Justice	229,587	53.73	6
Civic Coalition	68,804	16.10	2
Third Way	49,487	11.58	1
Confederation	37,301	8.73	1
There is One Poland	17,876	4.18	–
The Left	13,594	3.18	–
Nonpartisan Local Government Activists	10,643	2.49	–
Total	427,292	100.00	10
Valid votes	427,292	98.35	
Invalid/blank votes	7,174	1.65	
Total votes	434,466	100.00	
Registered voters/turnout	609,740	71.25	
Source: National Electoral Commission
