= Neues Wochenblatt =

German newspaper in Poland

- Monatsmagazin der Deutschen in Polen
- Type: Weekly
- Publisher: VdG Media
- Editor-in-chief: Krzysztof Świerc
- Editor: Anna Durecka; Manuela Leibig
- Associate editor: Mauro Oliveira
- Managing editor: Stefani Koprek
- General manager: Natalia Jasik-Schulwitz
- Affiliated: ifa
- Founded: 1990
- Language: German/Polish
- City: Opole
- Country: Poland
- Circulation: 6,500
- ISSN: 2082-8195
- OCLC number: 750900184
- Website: neueswochenblatt.pl

The Neues Wochenblatt (until January 2011: Schlesisches Wochenblatt; transl. Silesian Weekly) is a bilingual German-Polish newspaper published weekly in Opole, Poland, with a circulation of 6,500.

In April 2025, the Neues Wochenblatt's publisher, Verband der deutschen sozial-kulturellen Gesellschaften in Polen (VdG), announced that the publication would become digital with a monthly published edition replacing the previous weekly one.
