= Henryk Kroll =

Polish politician (born 1949)

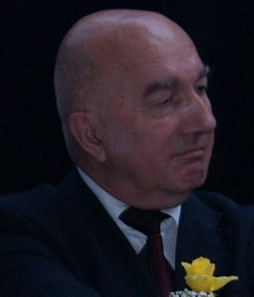

Leader of German Minority
- In office 23 March 1991 – 19 January 2008
- Preceded by: office established
- Succeeded by: Ryszard Galla

Member of Sejm
- In office 25 November 1991 – 4 November 2007

Personal details
- Born: 20 January 1949 (age 77) Gogolin, People's Republic of Poland
- Citizenship: Polish
- Party: German Minority

Henryk Kroll also known as Heinrich Kroll (born 20 January 1949 in Gogolin) is a Polish politician, and the former leader of German minority in Poland. He was initially elected to Sejm (Polish Parliament) in 1991. In the Polish parliamentary elections of 25 September 2005 he achieved 7852 votes in 21 Opole district, from the "Mniejszość Niemiecka" (German Minority) list. He remained a member of the Sejm until his defeat at the Polish parliamentary elections of 2007.

He was also a member of Sejm 1991-1993, Sejm 1993-1997, Sejm 1997-2001, and Sejm 2001-2005.

== See also ==
- Members of Polish Sejm 2005-2007
