= Opole Voivodeship Sejmik =

Legislature of Opole

Opole Voivodeship Sejmik Sejmik Województwa Opolskiego

Type
- Type: Unicameral

Leadership
- Chairperson: Rafał Bartek, MN
- Vice-Chairpersons: Dariusz Byczkowski, Piotr Wach, Jolanta Wilczyńska
- Marshal: Szymon Ogłaza, KO

Structure
- Seats: 30 councillors
- Political groups: Executive board (20): KO (14); KO (13); Independent (1); ŚS (5); MN (5); PSL (1); Opposition parties (10): PiS (10)

Elections
- Last election: 7 April 2024

Meeting place
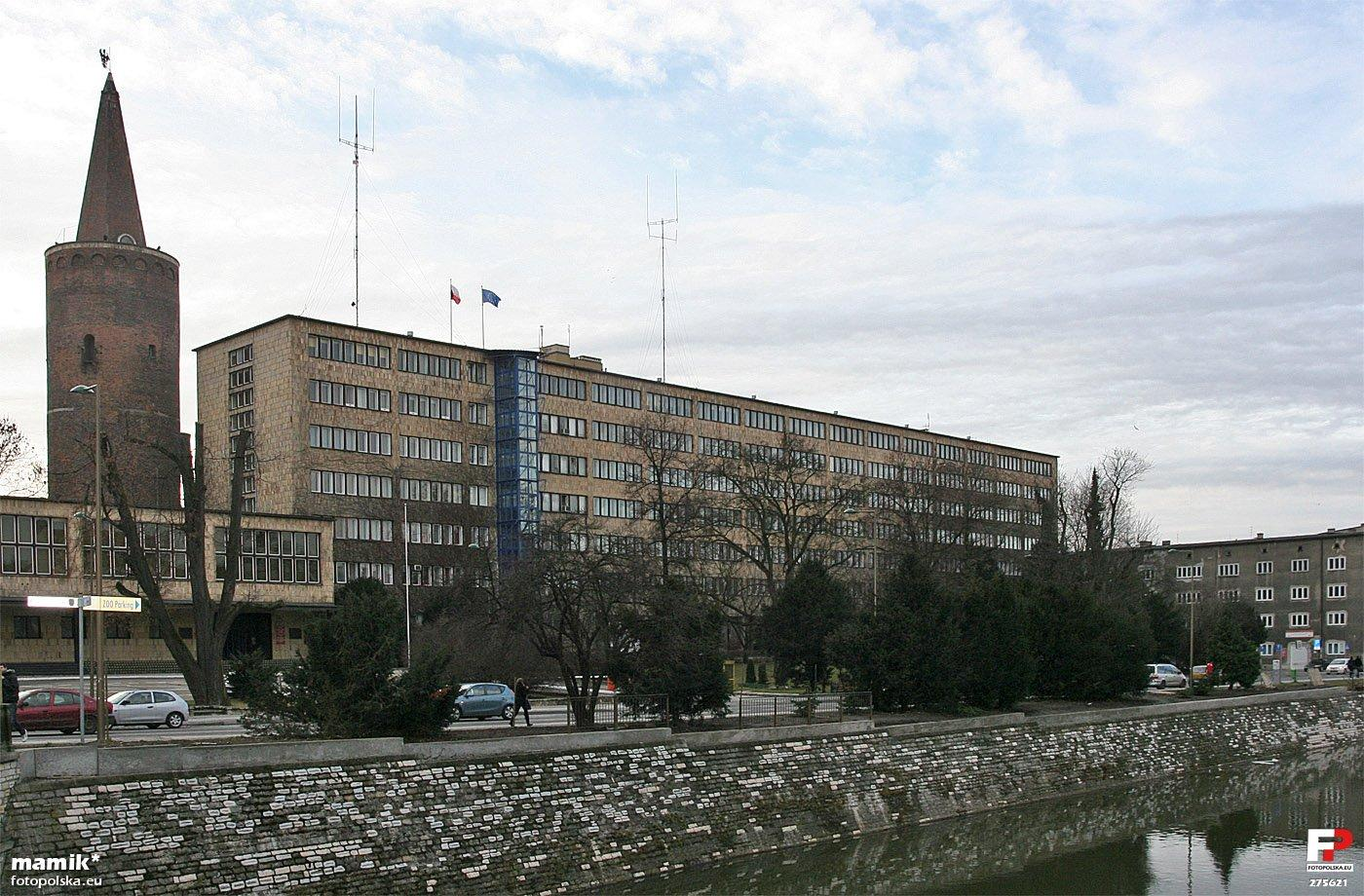
- Marshal's Office, Opole

Website
- Opole Regional Assembly

The Opole Voivodeship Sejmik (Polish: Sejmik Województwa Opolskiego) is the regional legislature of the Voivodeship of Opole in Poland. It is a unicameral parliamentary body consisting of thirty councillors elected to a five-year term. The current chairperson of the assembly is Rafał Bartek of the MN.

The assembly elects the executive board that acts as the collective executive for the provincial government, headed by the voivodeship marshal. The current Executive Board of Opole is a coalition government between the Civic Coalition, German Minority party and the Polish People's Party. The current marshal is Andrzej Buła of the KO.

The assembly convenes within the Marshal's Office in Opole.

== Districts ==
Members of the Assembly are elected from five districts and serve five-year terms. Districts does not have the constituencies' formal names. Instead, each constituency has a number and territorial description.

Number	Seats	City counties	Land counties
1	7	Opole	Opole
2	6	None	Kluczbork, Namysłów, Olesno
3	5	None	Kędzierzyn-Koźle, Strzelce
4	5	None	Głubczyce, Krapkowice, Prudnik
5	6	None	Brzeg, Nysa

== Composition ==
=== 1998 ===
Party	Mandates
Sojusz Lewicy Demokratycznej	14
Mniejszość Niemiecka	13
Akcja Wyborcza Solidarność	11
Unia Wolności	4
Przymierze Społeczne	3
Total	45

=== 2002 ===
Party	Mandates
Sojusz Lewicy Demokratycznej – Unia Pracy	11
Mniejszość Niemiecka	7
Liga Polskich Rodzin	3
Samoobrona Rzeczpospolitej Polskiej	3
Platforma Obywatelska – Prawo i Sprawiedliwość	3
Polskie Stronnictwo Ludowe	3
Total	30

=== 2006 ===
Party	Mandates
Platforma Obywatelska	8
Prawo i Sprawiedliwość	8
Mniejszość Niemiecka	7
Lewica i Demokraci	4
Polskie Stronnictwo Ludowe	3
Total	30

=== 2010 ===
Party	Mandates
Platforma Obywatelska	12
Mniejszość Niemiecka	6
Prawo i Sprawiedliwość	5
Sojusz Lewicy Demokratycznej	5
Polskie Stronnictwo Ludowe	2
Total	30

=== 2014 ===
Party	Mandates
Platforma Obywatelska	9
Polskie Stronnictwo Ludowe	8
Mniejszość Niemiecka	7
Prawo i Sprawiedliwość	5
SLD Lewica Razem	1
Total	30

=== 2018 ===
Party	Mandates
Koalicja Obywatelska	13
Prawo i Sprawiedliwość	10
Mniejszość Niemiecka	5
Polskie Stronnictwo Ludowe	2
Total	30

=== 2024 ===
Party	Mandates
Koalicja Obywatelska	14
Prawo i Sprawiedliwość	10
Śląscy Samorządowcy	5
Trzecia Droga	1
Total	30

== See also ==
- Polish Regional Assembly
- Opole Voivodeship
