= Sejm Constituency no. 28 =

Polish parliamentary constituency

28 - Częstochowa
- Constituency for the Sejm
- County: Częstochowa (city county), Częstochowa (county), Kłobuck, Lubliniec, Myszków

Current constituency
- Created: 2001
- Members: Law and Justice (3); Civic Coalition (3); Third Way (1)

Częstochowa, officially known as Constituency no. 28 is a parliamentary constituency in the Silesian Voivodeship. It elects 7 members of the Sejm.

The district has the number '28' for the election to the Sejm and covers the city county of Częstochowa, and Częstochowa, Kłobuck, Lubliniec and Myszków counties.

== List of Deputies ==
Deputies for the 10th Sejm (2023–2027)
Deputy	Party	Parliamentary group
Lidia Burzyńska	Law and Justice	Law and Justice
Andrzej Gawron	Law and Justice	Law and Justice
Szymon Giżyński	Law and Justice	Law and Justice
Izabela Leszczyna	Civic Platform	Civic Coalition
Andrzej Szewiński	Civic Platform	Civic Coalition
Przemysław Witek	Independent	Civic Coalition
Henryk Kiepura	Polish People's Party	Third Way

== Election results ==
=== 2001 ===
2001 Polish parliamentary election
Electoral committee	Votes	%	Seats
Democratic Left Alliance – Labour Union	101,772	47.03	4
Civic Platform	25,330	11.70	1
Self-Defence of the Republic of Poland	22,963	10.61	1
Law and Justice	17,081	7.89	1
Polish People's Party	15,446	7.14	–
Solidarity Electoral Action	15,138	6.99	–
League of Polish Families	11,854	5.48	–
Freedom Union	5,139	2.37	–
Social Alternative Movement	899	0.42	–
Polish Socialist Party	792	0.37	–
Total	216,414	100.00	7
Valid votes	216,414	95.88	
Invalid/blank votes	9,301	4.12	
Total votes	225,715	100.00	
Registered voters/turnout	482,658	46.76	
Source: National Electoral Commission

=== 2005 ===
2005 Polish parliamentary election
Electoral committee	Votes	%	Seats
Law and Justice	50,709	27.68	3
Civic Platform	45,397	24.78	2
Self-Defence of the Republic of Poland	25,141	13.73	1
Democratic Left Alliance	19,540	10.67	1
League of Polish Families	11,148	6.09	–
Polish People's Party	10,450	5.70	–
Social Democracy of Poland	8,684	4.74	–
Democratic Party	3,874	2.11	–
Janusz Korwin-Mikke Platform	2,998	1.64	–
Patriotic Movement	1,929	1.05	–
Polish Labour Party	1,729	0.94	–
Polish National Party	689	0.38	–
Polish Confederation – Dignity and Work	475	0.26	–
Initiative RP	413	0.23	–
Total	183,176	100.00	7
Valid votes	183,176	96.36	
Invalid/blank votes	6,910	3.64	
Total votes	190,086	100.00	
Registered voters/turnout	492,508	38.60	
Source: National Electoral Commission

=== 2007 ===
2007 Polish parliamentary election
Electoral committee	Votes	%	Seats
Civic Platform	102,606	40.12	3
Law and Justice	78,976	30.88	3
Left and Democrats	37,741	14.76	1
Polish People's Party	25,046	9.79	–
League of Polish Families	3,968	1.55	–
Self-Defence of the Republic of Poland	3,912	1.53	–
Polish Labour Party	3,479	1.36	–
Total	255,728	100.00	7
Valid votes	255,728	97.92	
Invalid/blank votes	5,441	2.08	
Total votes	261,169	100.00	
Registered voters/turnout	493,644	52.91	
Source: National Electoral Commission

=== 2011 ===
2011 Polish parliamentary election
Electoral committee	Votes	%	Seats
Civic Platform	78,500	34.97	3
Law and Justice	61,429	27.36	2
Palikot's Movement	30,049	13.39	1
Democratic Left Alliance	23,547	10.49	1
Polish People's Party	19,688	8.77	–
Poland Comes First	4,795	2.14	–
Congress of the New Right	4,614	2.06	–
Polish Labour Party - August 80	1,875	0.84	–
Total	224,497	100.00	7
Valid votes	224,497	95.39	
Invalid/blank votes	10,846	4.61	
Total votes	235,343	100.00	
Registered voters/turnout	495,295	47.52	
Source: National Electoral Commission

=== 2015 ===
2015 Polish parliamentary election
Electoral committee	Votes	%	Seats
Law and Justice	84,773	35.82	4
Civic Platform	49,580	20.95	2
Kukiz'15	27,521	11.63	1
United Left	26,305	11.12	–
Modern	15,942	6.74	–
Polish People's Party	11,799	4.99	–
KORWiN	10,111	4.27	–
Together	8,625	3.64	–
Committee of Zbigniew Stonoga	1,378	0.58	–
Committee of Grzegorz Braun "God Bless You!"	600	0.25	–
Total	236,634	100.00	7
Valid votes	236,634	97.55	
Invalid/blank votes	5,944	2.45	
Total votes	242,578	100.00	
Registered voters/turnout	486,784	49.83	
Source: National Electoral Commission

=== 2019 ===
2019 Polish parliamentary election
Electoral committee	Votes	%	Seats
Law and Justice	125,990	44.28	4
Civic Coalition	64,374	22.63	2
The Left	44,354	15.59	1
Polish Coalition	24,704	8.68	–
Confederation	17,278	6.07	–
Nonpartisan Local Government Activists	7,817	2.75	–
Total	284,517	100.00	7
Valid votes	284,517	98.87	
Invalid/blank votes	3,260	1.13	
Total votes	287,777	100.00	
Registered voters/turnout	470,075	61.22	
Source: National Electoral Commission

=== 2023 ===
2023 Polish parliamentary election
Electoral committee	Votes	%	Seats
Law and Justice	117,756	36.35	3
Civic Coalition	94,313	29.11	3
Third Way	47,698	14.72	1
The Left	30,497	9.41	–
Confederation	21,256	6.56	–
Nonpartisan Local Government Activists	6,775	2.09	–
There is One Poland	5,646	1.74	–
Total	323,941	100.00	7
Valid votes	323,941	98.07	
Invalid/blank votes	6,364	1.93	
Total votes	330,305	100.00	
Registered voters/turnout	444,929	74.24	
Source: National Electoral Commission
