= 2005 Polish presidential election =

- 9 October 2005 (first round); 23 October 2005 (second round)
- Turnout: 49.72% (first round) ▼11.36pp 50.98% (second round)
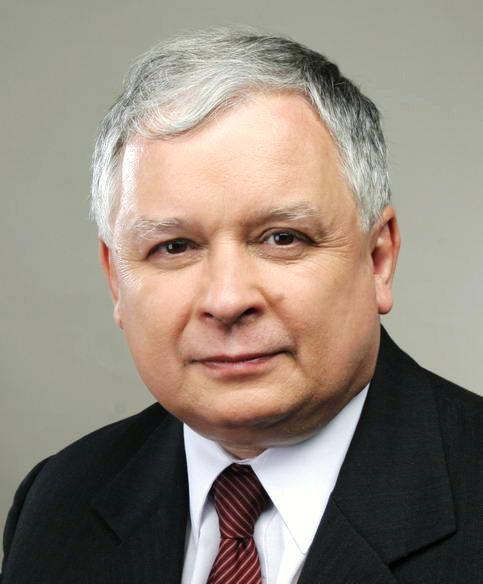

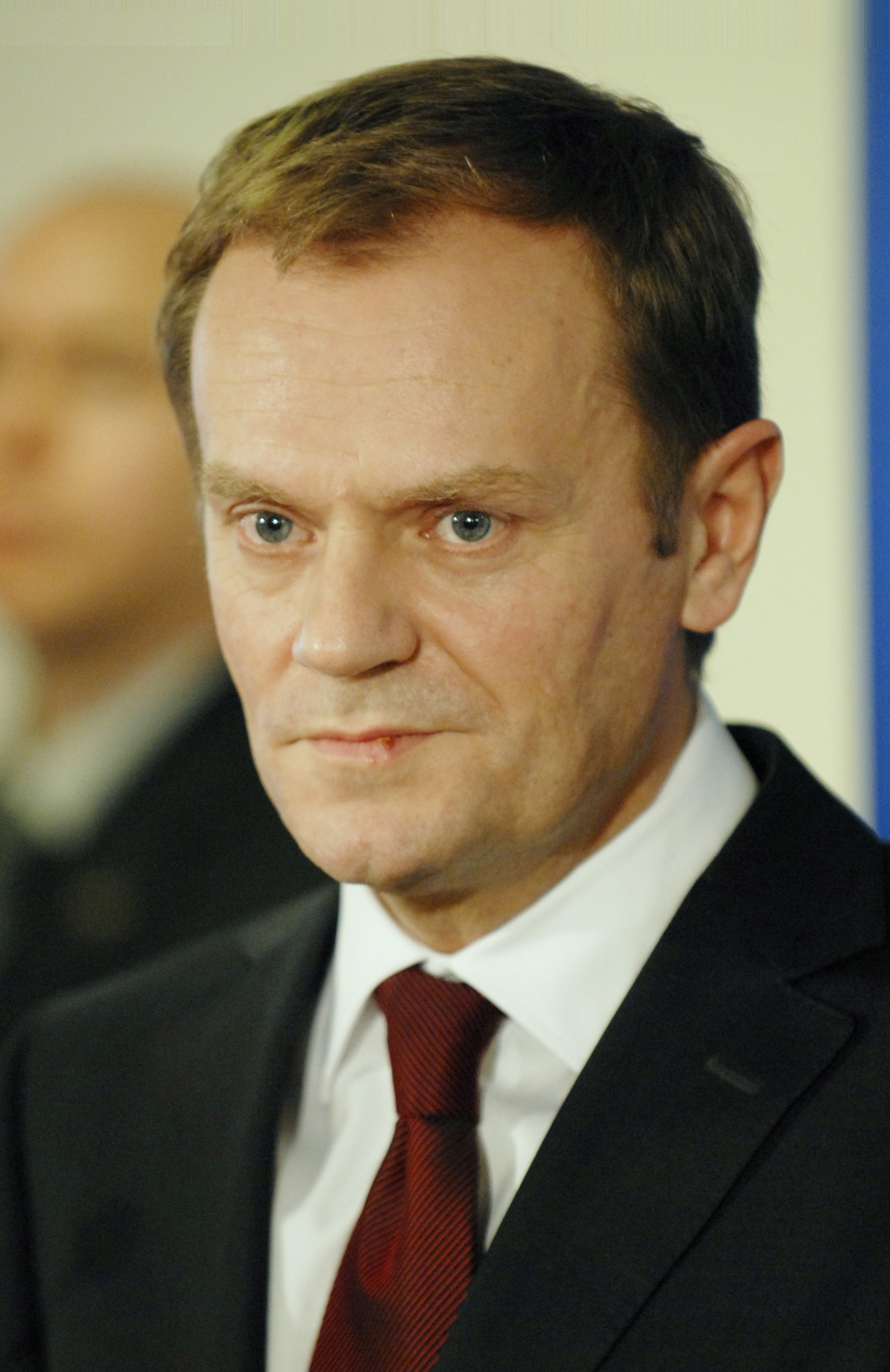
Nominee	Lech Kaczyński	Donald Tusk
Party	Law and Justice	PO
Popular vote	8,257,468	7,022,319
Percentage	54.04%	45.96%
President before election
Aleksander Kwaśniewski
Independent
Elected President
Lech Kaczyński
PiS

Presidential elections were held in Poland on 9 October and 23 October 2005. The outgoing President of Poland, Aleksander Kwaśniewski, had served the two five-year terms allowed under the constitution and was unable to stand for a third term. Lech Kaczyński defeated Donald Tusk to become President of Poland.

The election took place just a month after Kaczyński's Law and Justice party also defeated Tusk's Civic Platform in the parliamentary elections.

== Background ==
Two center-right candidates, Donald Tusk, chairman of the Civic Platform (PO) and Deputy Marshal of the Sejm, and Lech Kaczyński, honorary chairman of Law and Justice (PiS) and mayor of Warsaw, led the poll in the first round, as was widely expected. As neither received 50 percent of the vote, a second-round was held on 23 October. In this round, Kaczyński defeated Tusk, polling 54.04 percent of the vote.

Although both leading candidates came from the center-right, and their two parties had planned to form a coalition government following the legislative elections on 25 September, there were important differences between Tusk and Kaczyński. Tusk wanted to enforce separation of church and state, favored rapid European integration and supported a free-market economy. Kaczyński was very socially conservative, a soft Eurosceptic, and supported state interventionism. Such differences led to the failure of PiS-PO coalition talks in late October.

Włodzimierz Cimoszewicz, the candidate of the Alliance of the Democratic Left, which was the governing party before the legislative election withdrew from the race on September 14. At the time he withdrew he was third in the polls, still having the most chances to get to the second round (besides Kaczyński and Tusk).

Other candidates, who withdrew from the elections, but initially have signed to, were Zbigniew Religa and Maciej Giertych. Daniel Tomasz Podrzycki, who had also signed, died in an accident before the elections.

Ten people had registered themselves in election procedure, but failed to gather 100,000 support signatures: Arnold Buzdygan, Stanisław Ceberek, Gabriel Janowski, Jan Antoni Kiełb, Waldemar Janusz Kossakowski, Marian Romuald Rembelski, Zbigniew Roliński, Sławomir Salomon, Maria Szyszkowska, Bolesław Tejkowski.

The figure of Józef Tusk, grandfather of incumbent Polish Prime Minister Donald Tusk, was in the center of the "Wehrmacht affair" over his brief period of service after being drafted into the German army during the late stages of World War II, which was the biggest controversy of the election.

== Candidates ==
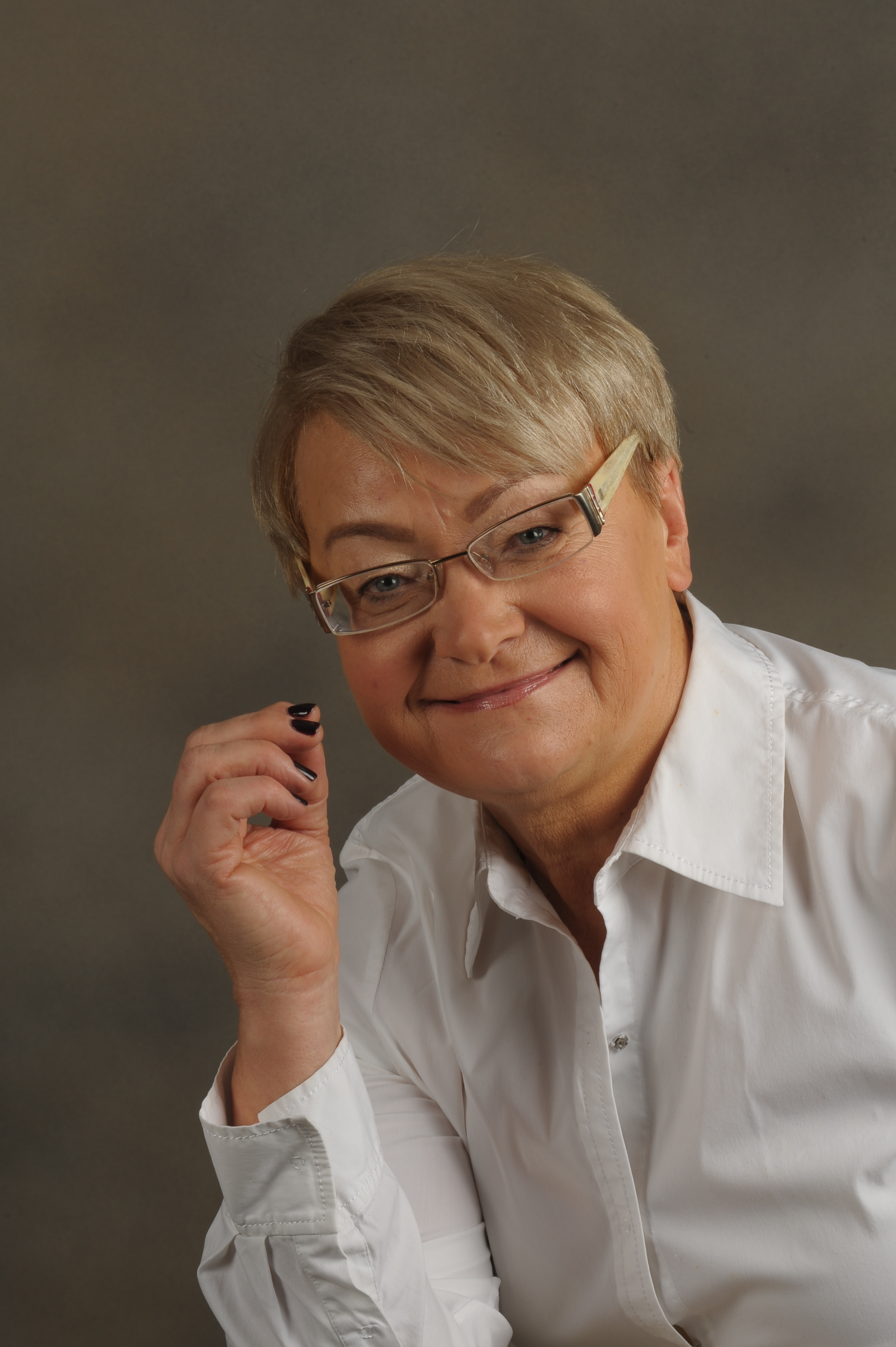
Former Minister of Industry and Trade Henryka Bochniarz (Independent), 57

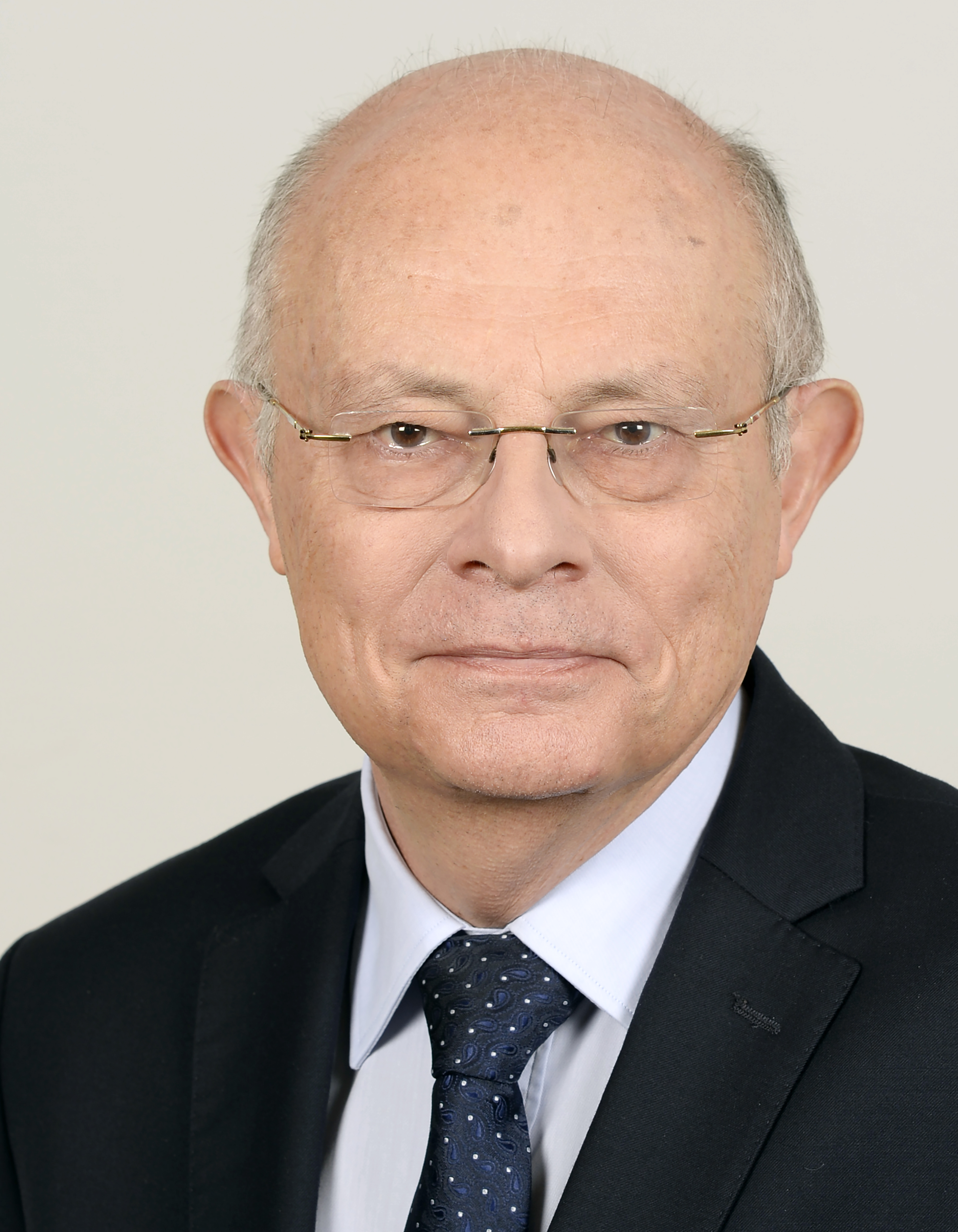
Former Marshall of the Sejm Marek Borowski (SDPL), 59

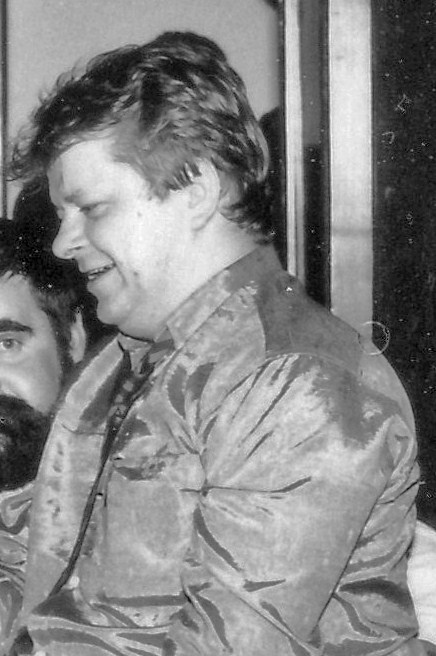
Former Member of the Sejm Leszek Bubel (Polish National Party), 48

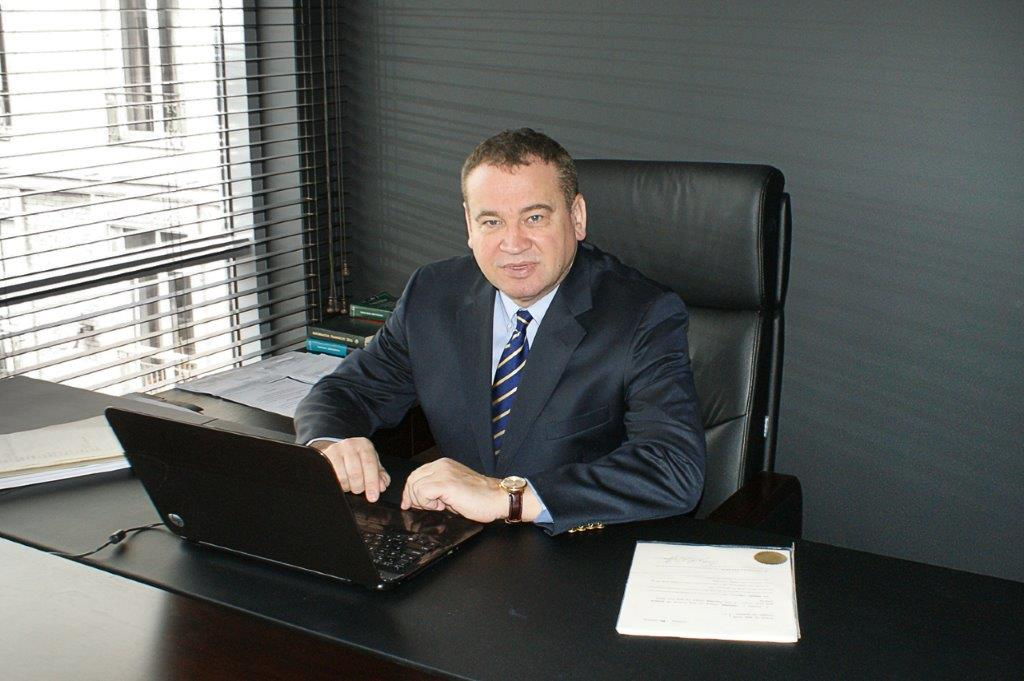
Lawyer Liwiusz Ilasz (Independent), 43

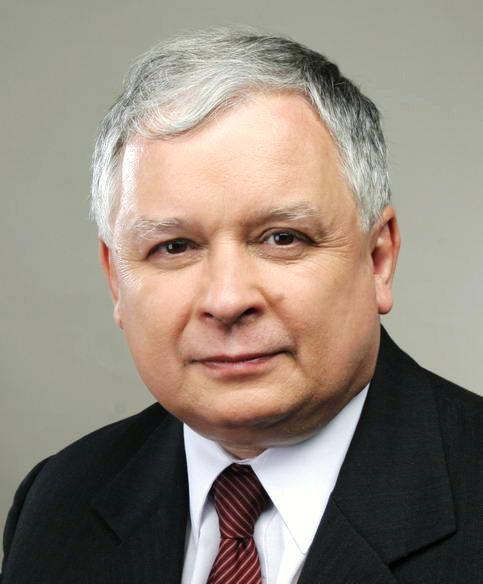
Mayor of Warsaw Lech Kaczyński (Law and Justice), 56

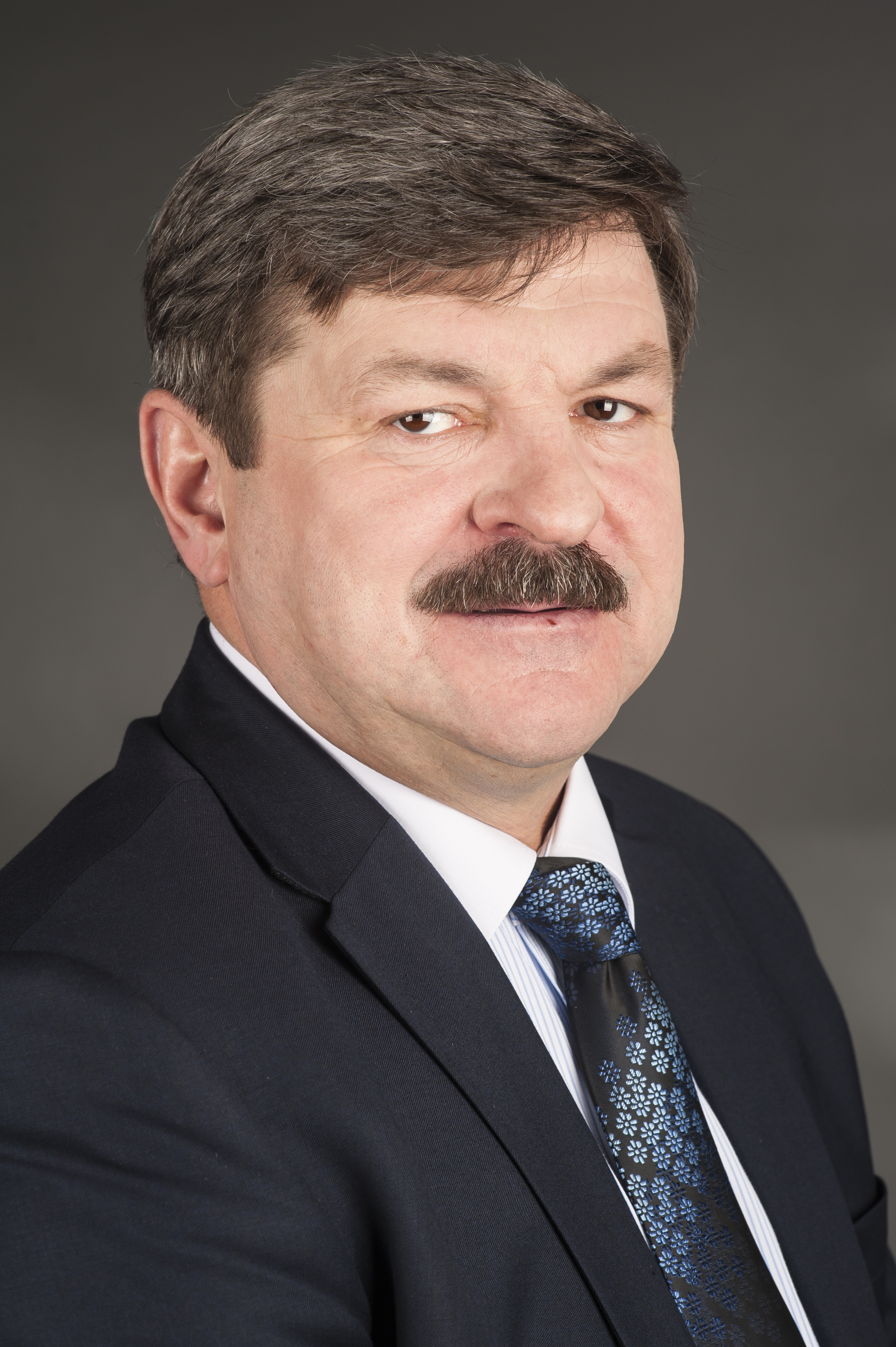
Former Deputy Prime Minister Jarosław Kalinowski (PSL), 43

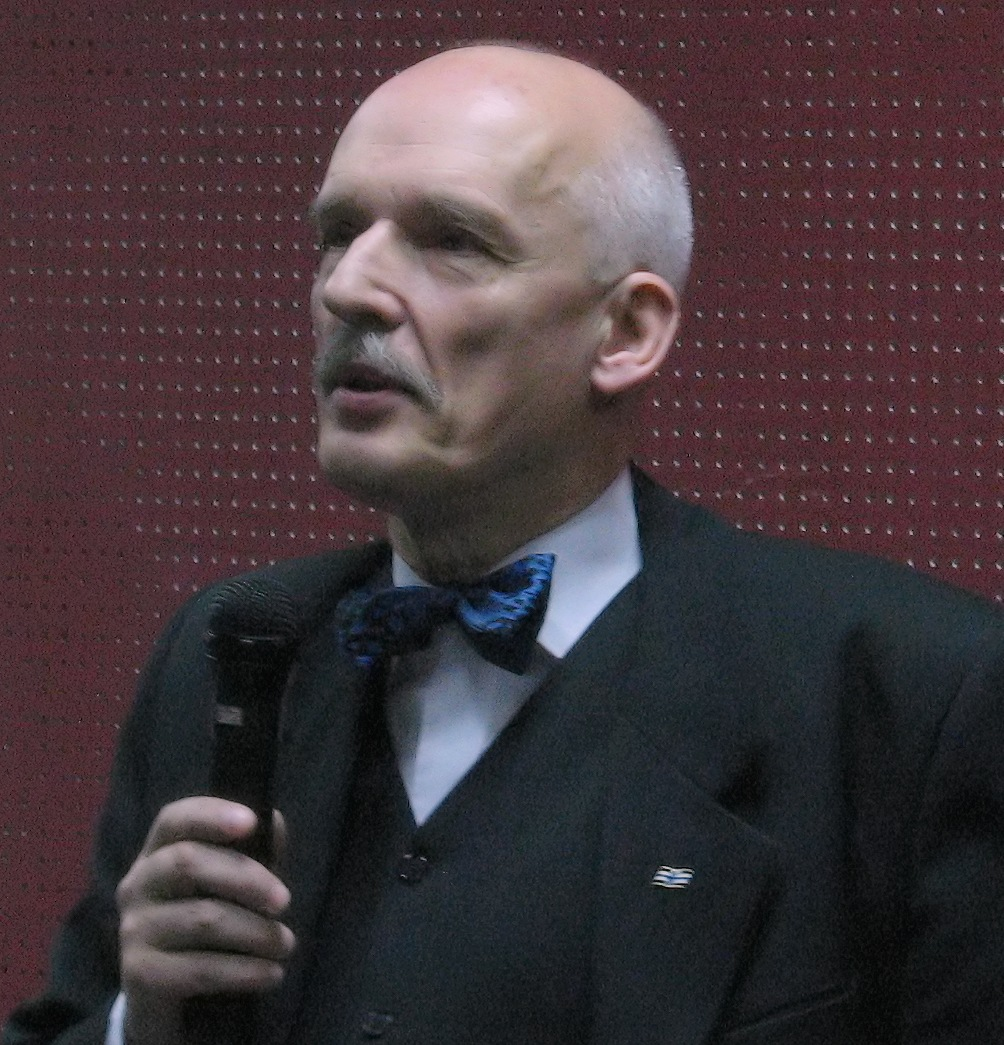
Former Member of the Sejm Janusz Korwin-Mikke (Real Politics Union), 63

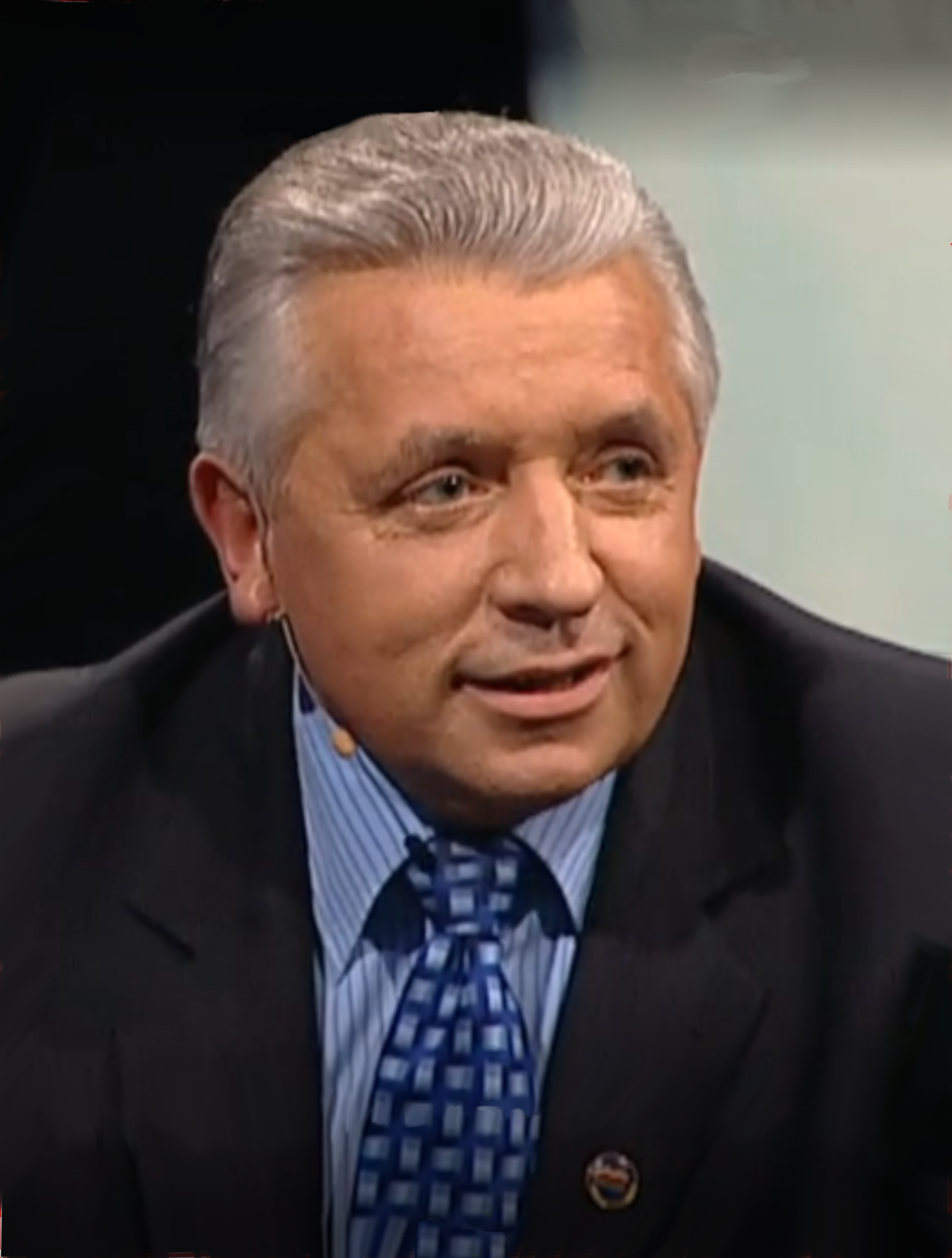
Former Deputy Marshal of the Sejm Andrzej Lepper (Self-Defense), 51

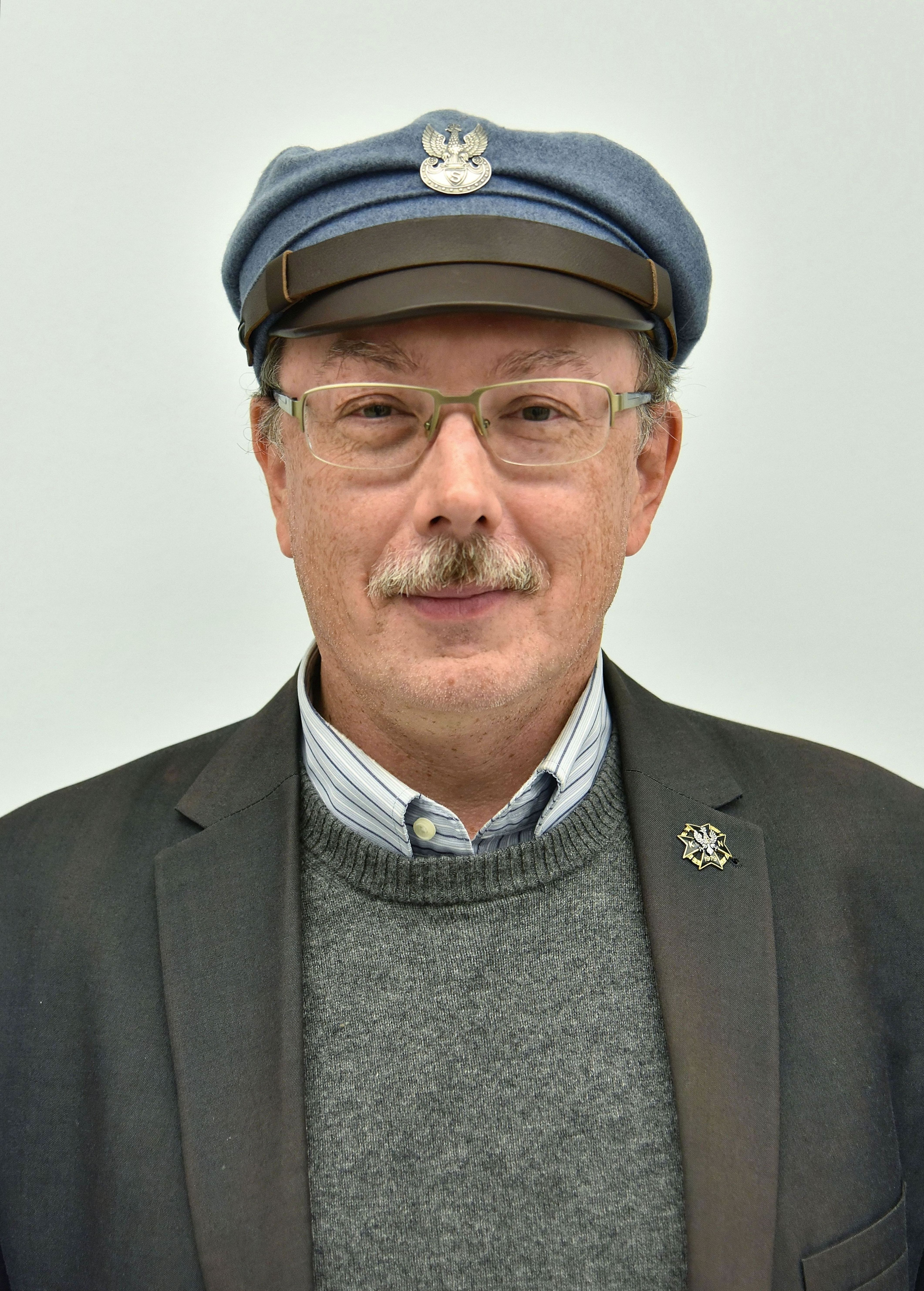
Former Member of the Sejm Adam Słomka (Polish Confederation), 41

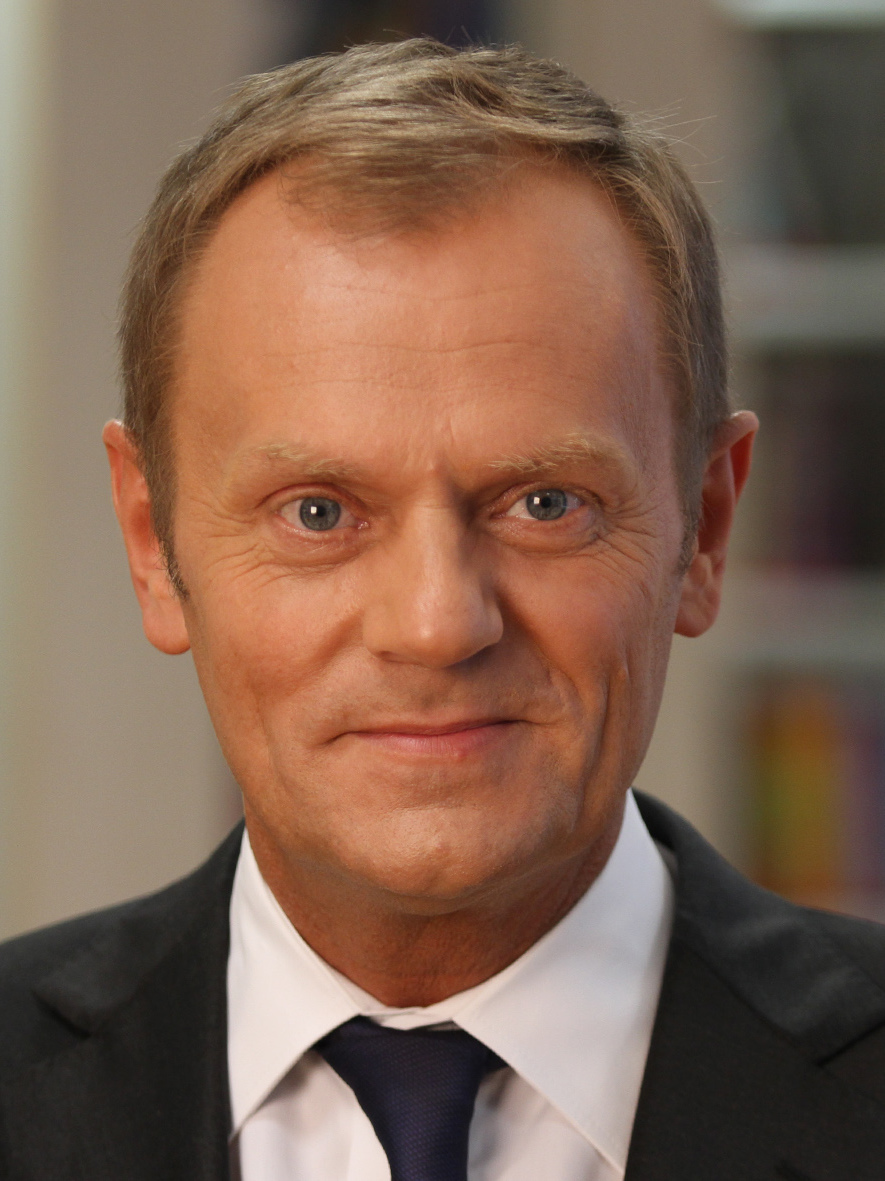
Deputy Marshal of the Sejm Donald Tusk (Civic Platform), 48

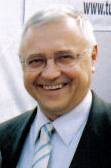
Businessman Stanisław Tymiński (Independent), 57
- Physician Jan Pyszko (Polish League), 75

=== Withdrawn ===
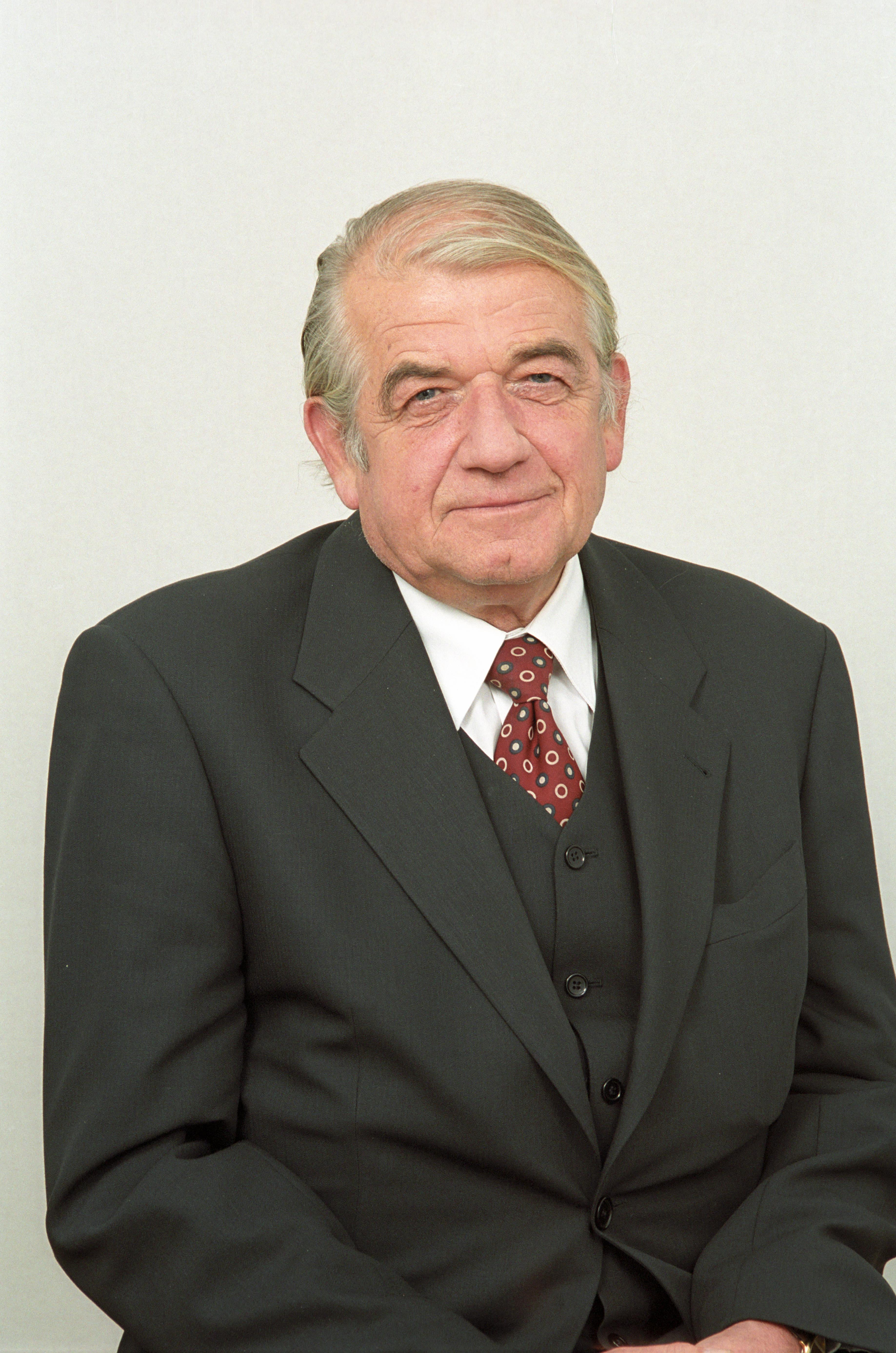
Senator Zbigniew Religa (Centre Party), 66
Endorsed Donald Tusk

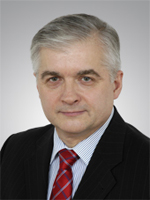
Marshal of the Sejm Włodzimierz Cimoszewicz (Democratic Left Alliance), 55

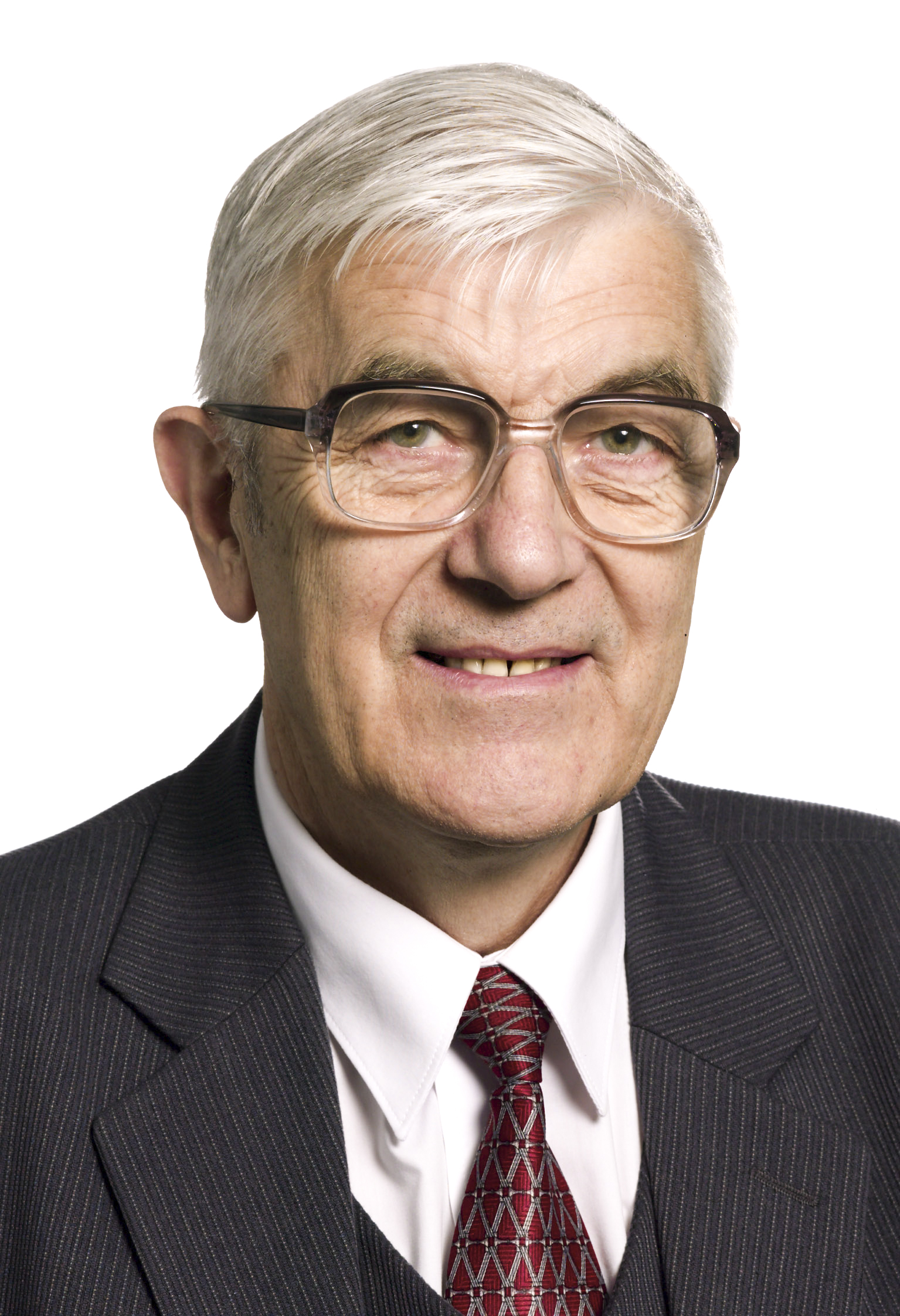
MEP Maciej Giertych (League of Polish Families, 69
Didn't endorse any candidate

=== Dead ===
- Journalist Daniel Podrzycki (Polish Labour Party), 42

== Opinion polls ==
=== Graphical summary ===
Graphical summary of the first round opinion polls: Lech Kaczyński Donald Tusk Andrzej Lepper Marek Borowski J. Kalinowski J. Korwin-Mikke Henryka Bochniarz ~~Zbigniew Religa~~ ~~W. Cimoszewicz~~ ~~Maciej Giertych~~

=== First round ===
Pollster	Date of polling	Kaczyński PiS	Tusk PO	Lepper SRP	Borowski SDPL	Kalinowski PSL	Korwin-Mikke UPR	Bochniarz PD	Religa Centrum	Cimoszewicz SLD	Giertych LPR	Others
Election results	9 October 2005	33.10	36.33	15.11	10.33	1.80	1.43	1.26	-	-	-	0.70
CBOS	1–3 October 2005	35	40	11	8	3	2	0	-	-	-	1
PGB	30 September 2005	31	35	17	11	2	1	1	-	-	2	0
CBOS	14–18 September 2005	26	44	15	7	3	2	1	-	-	1	1
Rzeczpospolita	17 September 2005	29	51	7	7	2			-	-	2	2
PBS	15 September 2005	22	49	9	8	3	2	2	-	-	3	2
Polityka	13 September 2005	22	43	10					-	17		8
Ipsos	9 August 2005	24	24	12	5	3	2	0	7	19	2	2
OBOP	8 August 2005	21	23	9	5	2			7	26	3	4
PBS	8 August 2005	20	19	14	3				9	23	4	8
CBOS	5–8 August 2005	21	22	13	5	2	1	1	9	21	3	2
PGB	13 July 2005	22	11	15	6	3		1	9	23	6	4
OBOP	11 July 2005	19	12	11	2.4	1.9			12	35	2.4	4.3
Gazeta Wyborcza	6 July 2005	18	12	10	5	3			14	29	3	6
CBOS	1–4 July 2005	20	9	12	5	3			13	31	3	4
CBOS	3–6 June 2005	25	11	12	14	3			23		4	8
PBS	13 May 2005	27	14		9				16	15		19
CBOS	6–9 May 2005	22	13	14	10				15	14	2	10
OBOP (Note: Question asked: "Who would be the best president?")	5–9 May 2005	13	8	8	6				10	9	1	16 (Note: Jan Maria Rokita (4), Józef Zych (3), Jan Olszewski (2), Tadeusz Mazowiecki (2), Waldemar Pawlak (1), Adam Gierek (1), Maciej Płażyński (0), Władysław Frasyniuk (0), Others (3).)
PGB	2 May 2005	23	13		13				10	9	10	22
Pentor	25 April 2005	21	9	13	9				22	15	2	9
PBS	22 April 2005	26	11	11	12				16	14	4	6
PGB	20 April 2005	24	13	13	14				7	8	9	12
CBOS	1-2, 9–10 April 2005	21	9	13	9				22	15	2	9
CBOS	4–7 March 2005	4	2	6	4				8	4	2	70

== Results ==
Voter turnout in the first round was low with only 49.7% of all eligible voters casting their votes.

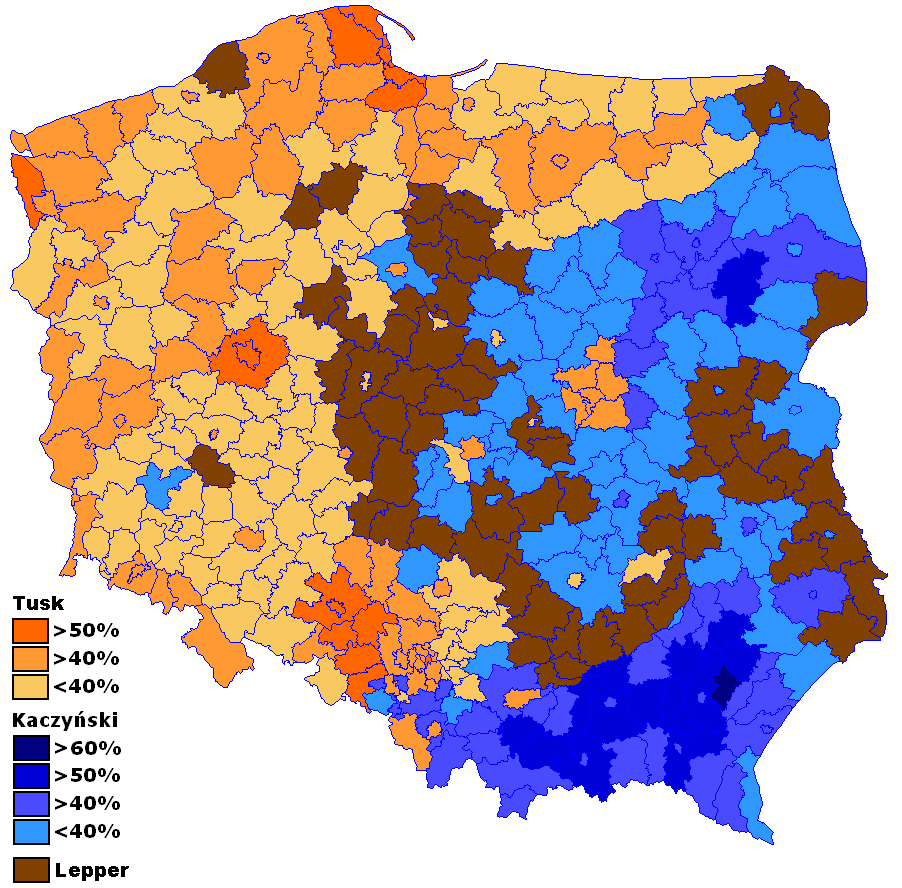
Results of the first round

Candidate	Party	First round		Second round	
Candidate	Party	Votes	%	Votes	%
Lech Kaczyński	Law and Justice	4,947,927	33.10	8,257,468	54.04
Donald Tusk	Civic Platform	5,429,666	36.33	7,022,319	45.96
Andrzej Lepper	Self-Defense of the Republic of Poland	2,259,094	15.11		
Marek Borowski	Social Democracy of Poland	1,544,642	10.33		
Jarosław Kalinowski	Polish People's Party	269,316	1.80		
Janusz Korwin-Mikke	Real Politics Union	214,116	1.43		
Henryka Bochniarz	Democratic Party	188,598	1.26		
Liwiusz Ilasz	Independent	31,691	0.21		
Stanisław Tymiński	All-Polish Citizens Coalition	23,545	0.16		
Leszek Bubel	Polish National Party	18,828	0.13		
Jan Pyszko	Organisation of the Polish Nation – Polish League	10,371	0.07		
Adam Słomka	Polish Confederation – Dignity and Work	8,895	0.06		
Total		14,946,689	100.00	15,279,787	100.00
Valid votes		14,946,689	99.34	15,279,787	98.99
Invalid/blank votes		99,661	0.66	155,233	1.01
Total votes		15,046,350	100.00	15,435,020	100.00
Registered voters/turnout		30,260,027	49.72	30,279,209	50.98
Source: PKW, PKW

Vote share
Second round
L. Kaczyński	54.04%
Tusk	45.96%
First round
Tusk	36.33%
L. Kaczyński	33.10%
Lepper	15.11%
Borowski	10.33%
Pawlak	1.80%
Korwin-Mikke	1.43%
Bochniarz	1.26%
Others	0.63%
