= 2005 Polish parliamentary election =

- 25 September 2005
- Opinion polls
- Registered: 30,229,031
- Sejm

All 460 seats in the Sejm 231 seats needed for a majority
- Turnout: 12,244,903 (40.57%) ▼5.72pp
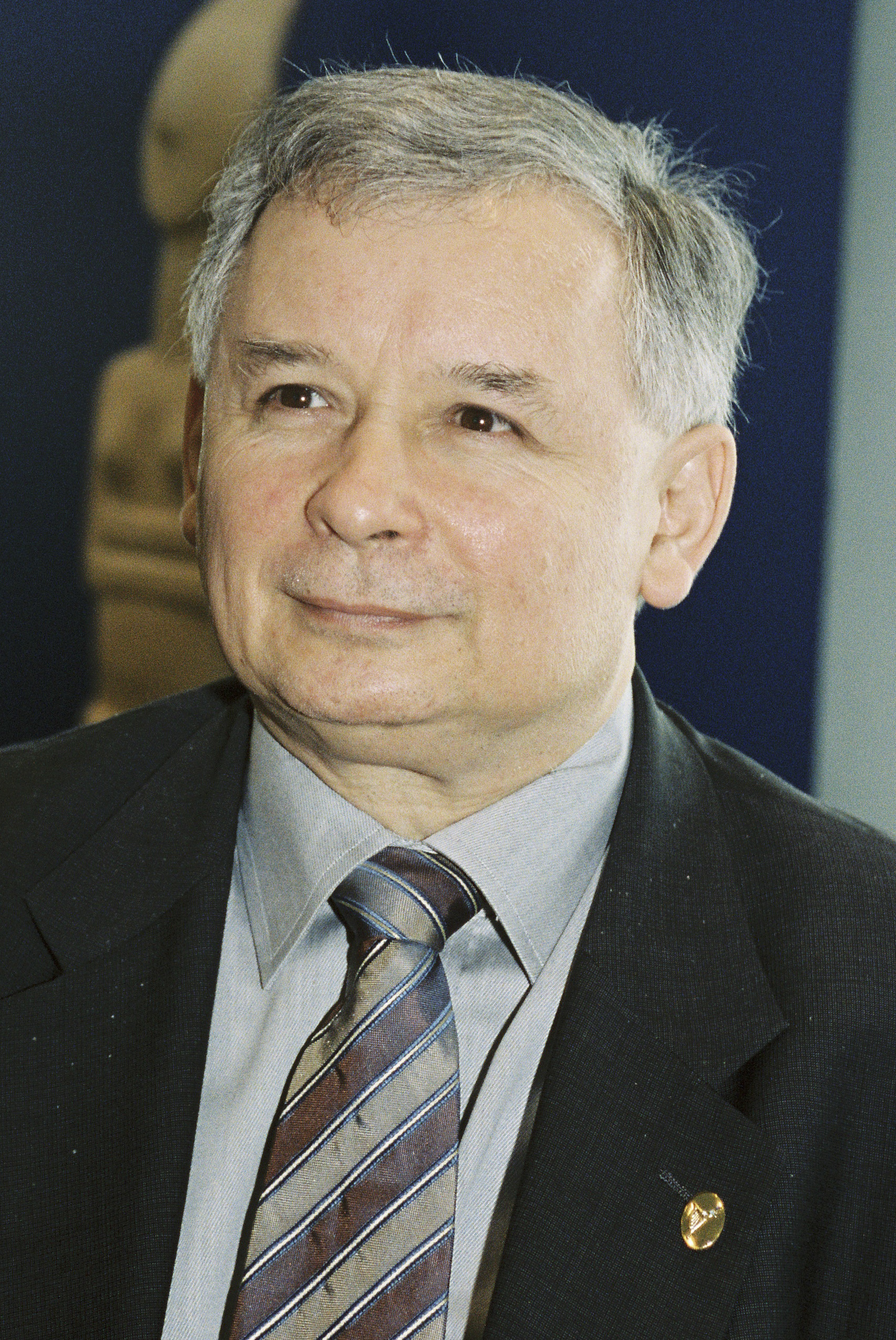

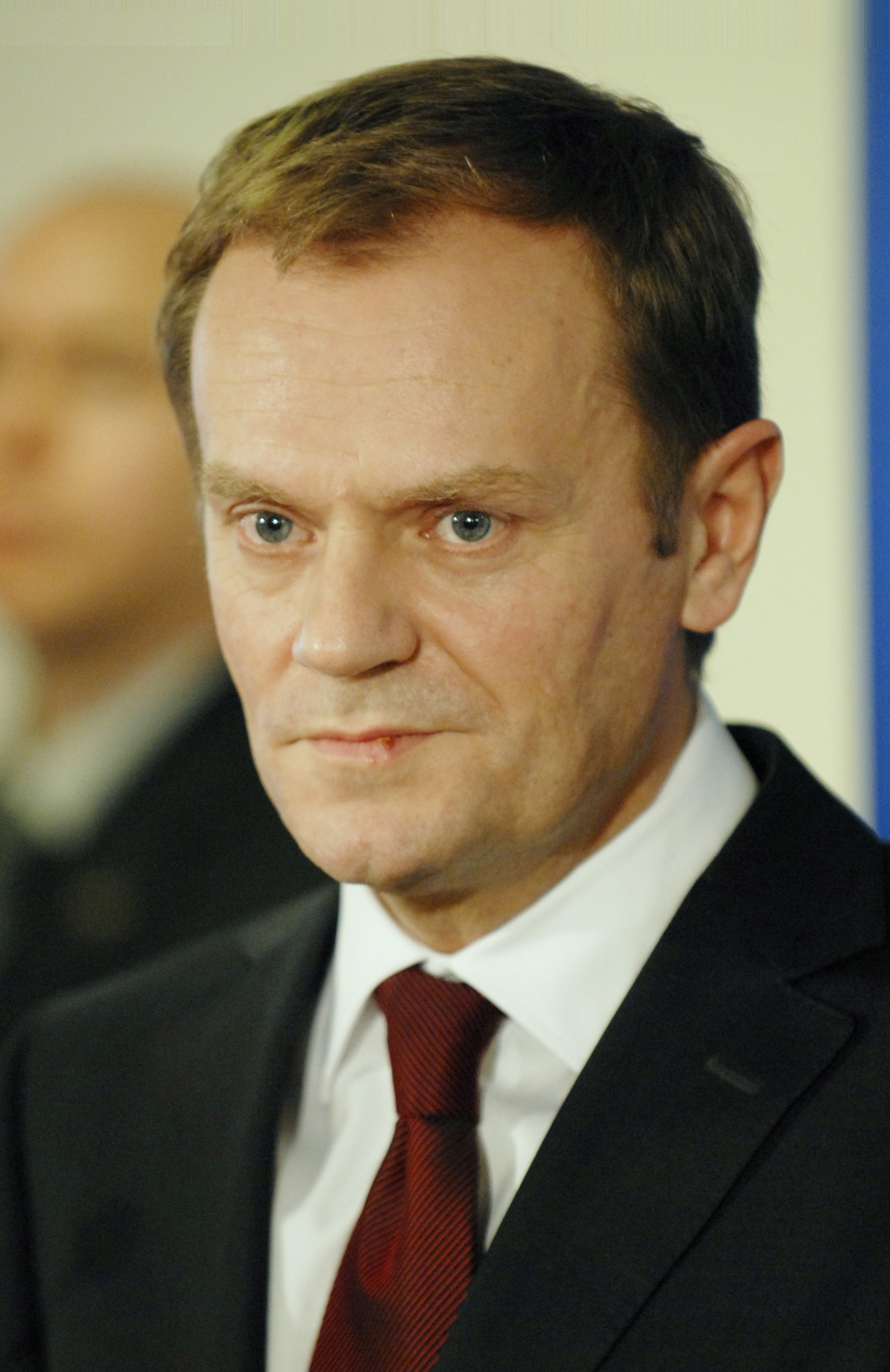

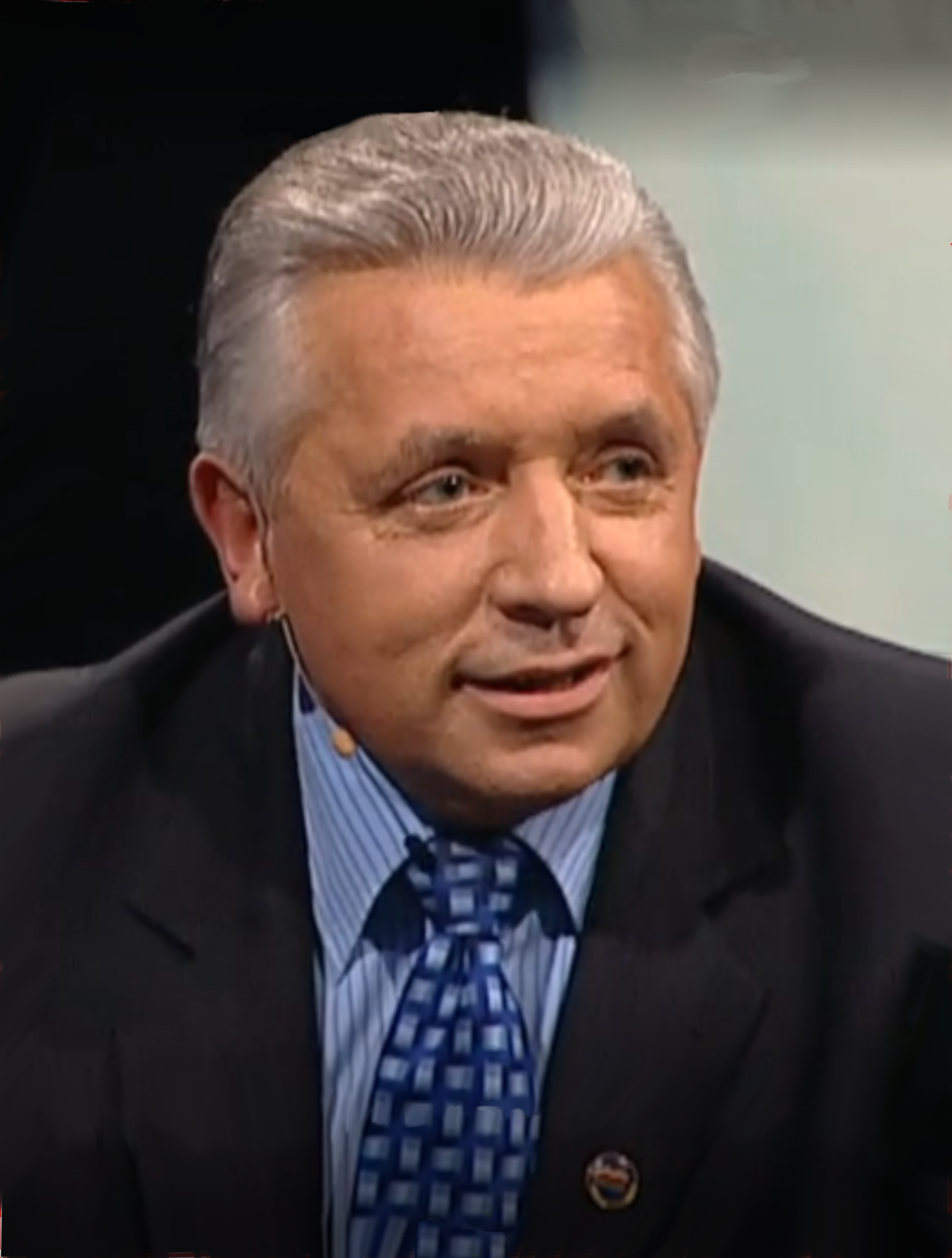

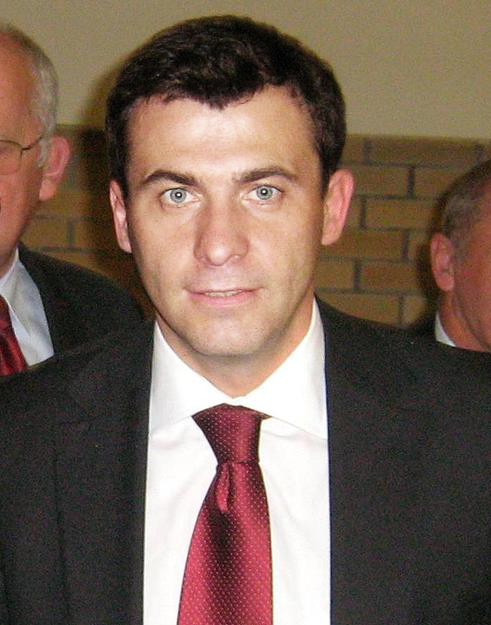

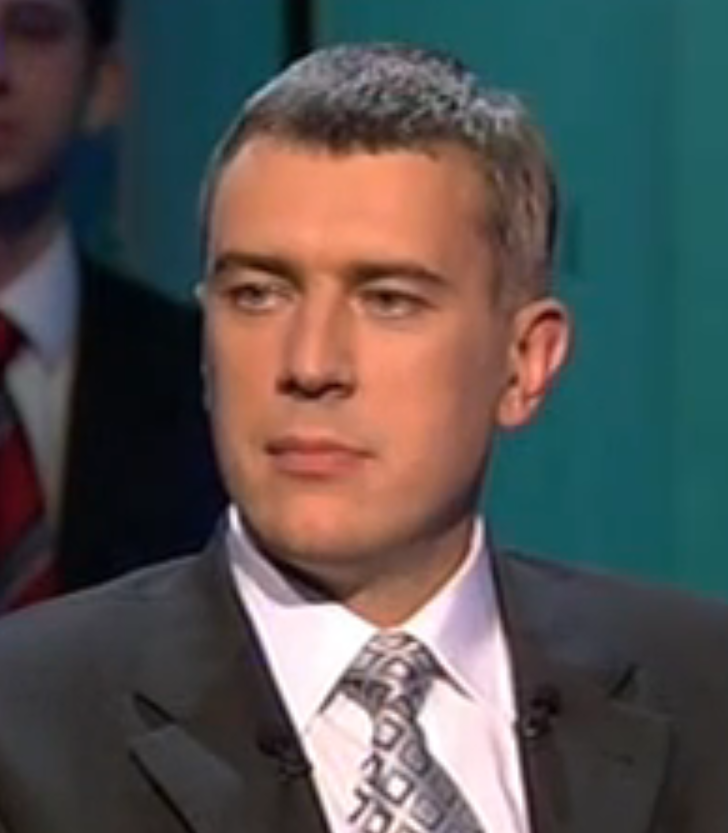

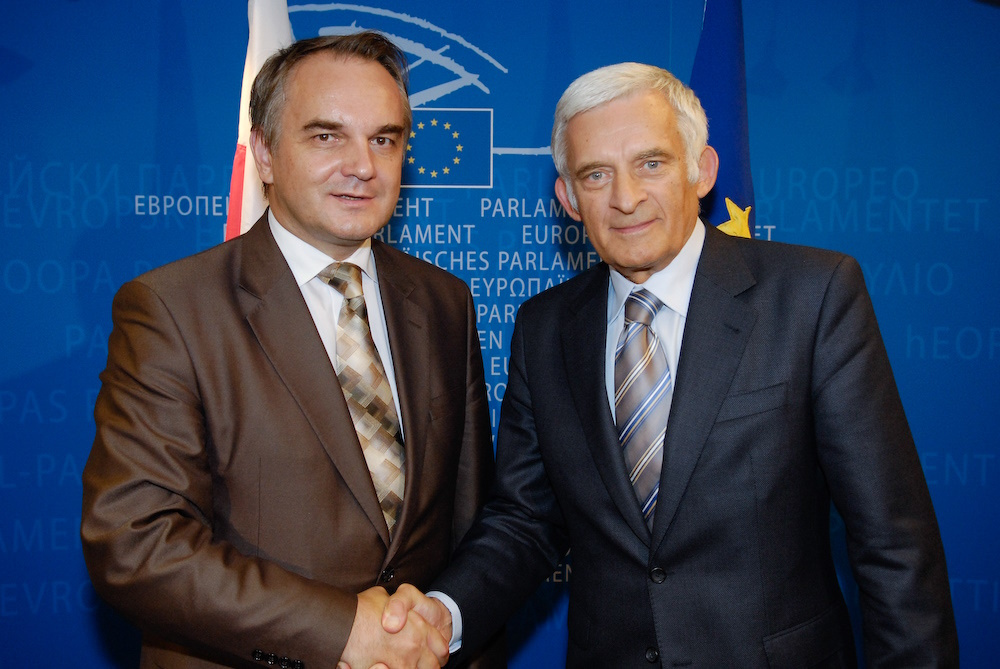
	Majority party	Minority party	Third party
Leader	Jarosław Kaczyński	Donald Tusk	Andrzej Lepper
Party	PiS	PO	SRP
Leader since	18 January 2003	1 June 2003	10 January 1992
Last election	9.5%, 44 seats	12.7%, 65 seats	10.2%, 53 seats
Seats won	155	133	56
Seat change	▲111	▲68	▲3
Popular vote	3,185,714	2,849,269	1,347,355
Percentage	27.0%	24.1%	11.4%
Swing	▲17.5 pp	▲11.4 pp	▲1.2 pp
	Fourth party	Fifth party	Sixth party
Leader	Wojciech Olejniczak	Roman Giertych	Waldemar Pawlak
Party	SLD	LPR	PSL
Leader since	29 May 2005	26 January 2002 (Note: De facto leader of the party, while Marek Kotlinowski was the party president. Giertych was also the president of the party congress since 2002.)	29 January 2005
Last election	41.0%, 216 seats	7.9%, 38 seats	9.0%, 42 seats
Seats won	55	34	25
Seat change	▼161	▼4	▼17
Popular vote	1,335,257	940,762	821,656
Percentage	11.3%	8.0%	7.0%
Swing	▼29.7 pp	▲0.1 pp	▼2.0 pp
- Senate
- All 100 seats in the Senate; 51 seats needed for a majority
- Turnout: 12,239,019 (40.49%) ▼5.66pp
Party	Vote %	Seats	+/–
PiS	20.80	49	+49
PO	16.94	34	+32
LPR	12.39	7	+5
SRP	8.35	3	+1
PSL	5.86	2	−2
Independent	11.57	5	+3
This lists parties that won seats. See the complete results below.

Government before	Government after election
Belka cabinet SLD—UP	Marcinkiewicz cabinet PiS (Note: The Marcinkiewicz cabinet was a minority government from 2005 to 2006 with confidence from PSL. In 2006, his government was expanded into a PiS—SRP—LPR coalition.)

Parliamentary elections were held in Poland on 25 September 2005. All 460 members of the Sejm and 100 senators of the Senate were elected. The election resulted in a sweeping victory for two opposition parties: the right-wing, national-conservative Law and Justice (PiS) and the centre-right, liberal-conservative Civic Platform (PO). The incumbent centre-left government of the Democratic Left Alliance (SLD) was soundly defeated. PiS won 155 seats and PO 133, while the governing SLD was reduced to fourth place with 55 seats, behind Andrzej Lepper's Self-Defence party, which won 56 seats.

Normally, this would have made PiS leader Jarosław Kaczyński Prime Minister. However, he declined the post so as not to prejudice his twin brother Lech's chances for the presidential election held later in October. In his place, Law and Justice nominated Kazimierz Marcinkiewicz for the post. Outgoing Prime Minister Marek Belka failed to win a seat in Łódź.

In the Senate, PiS won 49 seats and PO 34 of the 100 seats, leaving eight other parties with the remaining 17 seats. The SLD won no seats in the Senate.

In the subsequent presidential elections, Lech Kaczyński of the PiS defeated PO leader Donald Tusk.

== Background ==
The 2005 Sejm was elected by proportional representation from multi-member constituencies, with seats divided among parties which gain more than five percent of the votes using the d'Hondt method. On the other hand, the Senate was elected under first-past-the-post bloc voting. This tended to cause the party or coalition which wins the elections to have a larger majority in the Senate than in the Sejm.

In the 2001 elections the SLD and UP won 216 of the 460 seats, and were able to form a government with the support of the Polish People's Party (PSL). The former ruling party, Solidarity Electoral Action (AWS) based on the Solidarity trade union, lost all its seats. In its place several new right-wing parties emerged, such as the PO and the PiS.

After 2003 a variety of factors combined to bring about a collapse of support for the government. Discontent with high unemployment, government spending cuts (especially on health, education and welfare), affairs related to privatizations was compounded by a series of corruption scandals, the most serious of them being Rywin-gate. Prime Minister Leszek Miller resigned in May 2004 and was succeeded by Marek Belka. All opinion polls suggested that the governing SLD-UP coalition would be heavily defeated at these elections and that the right-wing parties would win a large majority. With the expected downfall of the post-communists, the right-wing parties competed mainly against each other.

== Contestants ==
The parties running in this election were mainly the same as in 2001, with the addition of Social Democracy of Poland (a splinter group from the Democratic Left Alliance), and the Democratic Party formed from the Freedom Union (UW) and some SLD dissidents. Both these new parties failed to win seats.

The BBC commented on election day: "The two centre-right parties are both rooted in the anti-communist Solidarity movement but differ on issues such as the budget and taxation. Law and Justice, whose agenda includes tax breaks and state aid for the poor, has pledged to uphold traditional family and Christian values. It is suspicious of economic liberalism. The Citizens Platform strongly promotes free market forces and wants to introduce a flat 15% rate for income tax, corporation tax and VAT. It also promises to move faster on deregulation and privatisation, in order to adopt the euro as soon as possible."

== Opinion polls ==
Graphical summary of opinion polls: Law and Justice Civic Platform Self-Defence Democratic Left Alliance League of Polish Families Polish People's Party Social Democracy Democratic Party Freedom Union (Note: Reformed as the Democratic Party – demokraci.pl in May 2005.) Labour Union (Note: Contested election in the lists of Social Democracy of Poland.)

== Results ==
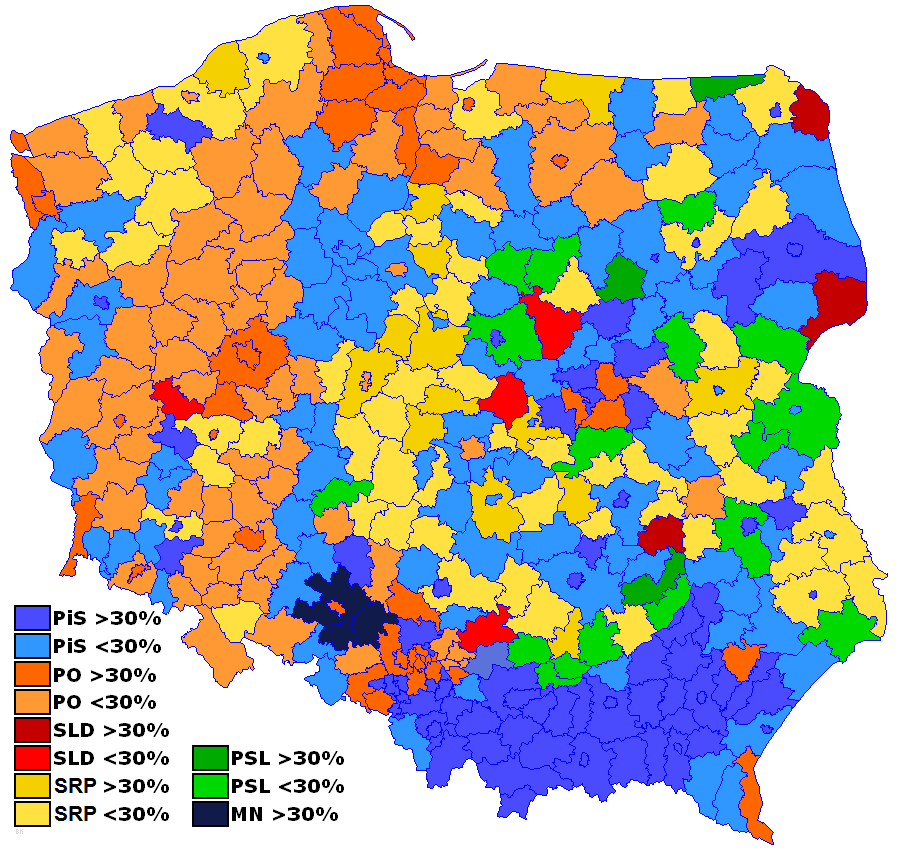
Powiats won by ■ – Civic Platform ■ – Law and Justice ■ – Polish People's Party ■ – Democratic Left Alliance ■ – Self-Defense ■ – German Minority

Had the two leading parties been able to form a coalition as expected, it would have had 63 percent of seats in the Assembly, just short of the two-thirds supermajority required to carry out constitutional reform. Instead however, PiS formed a coalition with two other parties, SRP, and LPR. The populist and isolationist Self-Defense of the Polish Republic (Samoobrona) slightly improved its representation and became the third largest party ahead of the SLD, which despite losing most of its seats performed slightly better than expected based on opinion polls. However, the party lost all its Senate seats. The League of Polish Families and the Polish People's Party retained their representation. The German minority in Poland is exempt from the requirement of achieving at least 5% of the total vote and retained their two seats.

=== Sejm ===
Party	Votes	%	Seats	+/–
Law and Justice	3,185,714	26.99	155	+111
Civic Platform	2,849,259	24.14	133	+68
Self-Defence of the Republic of Poland	1,347,355	11.41	56	+3
Democratic Left Alliance	1,335,257	11.31	55	–161
League of Polish Families	940,762	7.97	34	–4
Polish People's Party	821,656	6.96	25	–17
Social Democracy of Poland	459,380	3.89	0	New
Democratic Party	289,276	2.45	0	New
Janusz Korwin-Mikke Platform	185,885	1.57	0	New
Patriotic Movement	124,038	1.05	0	New
Polish Labour Party	91,266	0.77	0	New
German Minority Electoral Committee	34,469	0.29	2	0
Polish National Party	34,127	0.29	0	New
Ancestral Home	32,863	0.28	0	New
Centre	21,893	0.19	0	New
All-Poland Civic Coalition	16,251	0.14	0	New
Initiative of the Republic of Poland	11,914	0.10	0	New
Polish Confederation – Dignity and Work	8,353	0.07	0	New
National Revival of Poland	7,376	0.06	0	New
German Minority of Silesia	5,581	0.05	0	0
Labour Party	1,019	0.01	0	New
Social Rescuers	982	0.01	0	New
Total	11,804,676	100.00	460	0
Valid votes	11,804,676	96.40		
Invalid/blank votes	440,227	3.60		
Total votes	12,244,903	100.00		
Registered voters/turnout	30,229,031	40.51		
Source: Nohlen & Stöver

==== By constituency ====
Although PiS and PO were the clear winners, their vote was very unevenly distributed, being overwhelmingly concentrated in the cities, particularly Warsaw and the southern industrial areas around Kraków and Katowice, but also including Gdańsk, Gdynia, Poznań, Wrocław and Szczecin. The only urban centre not to endorse the right was Łódź. The two main parties failed to win a majority in any rural district except Rzeszów in the south. In seven rural districts they polled less the 40 percent of the vote, while in one (Chełm) they polled less than 35 percent. Self-Defence managed to win in four districts. The vote shows the continuing sharp divide in Polish politics between urban voters, who are generally more socially liberal and in favour of free-market economics, and rural voters, who are more socially conservative and economically left-wing.

Constituency	Turnout	PiS	PO	SRP	SLD	LPR	PSL	SDPL	PD	MN	Others	Lead
1 – Legnica	36.75	24.77	24.41	12.65	15.26	6.90	3.85	3.29	4.23	-	4.64	0.36
2 – Wałbrzych	35.74	22.21	25.93	13.25	13.86	7.25	6.51	5.29	1.71	-	3.99	3.72
3 – Wrocław	46.73	25.70	32.36	8.42	10.00	6.73	3.03	3.98	4.28	-	5.50	6.66
4 – Bydgoszcz	37.98	24.71	20.80	11.70	18.66	6.70	6.16	3.11	1.70	-	6.46	3.91
5 – Toruń	35.69	22.67	18.64	18.59	11.77	7.98	7.05	5.55	3.88	-	3.87	4.03
6 – Lublin	42.89	25.82	17.04	14.59	8.09	12.37	11.36	4.21	1.55	-	4.97	8.78
7 – Chełm	38.64	20.82	11.40	20.83	8.32	12.35	18.32	3.31	1.01	-	3.64	0.01
8 – Zielona Góra	35.44	22.84	24.21	11.41	16.18	7.63	7.85	3.51	1.99	-	4.38	1.37
9 – Łódź	43.62	24.63	24.30	8.63	14.12	7.64	2.13	5.72	6.04	-	6.79	0.33
10 – Piotrków Trybunalski	39.31	23.26	15.33	21.56	11.20	9.06	10.80	2.82	1.76	-	4.21	1.70
11 – Sieradz	38.10	21.38	15.04	21.87	14.86	6.64	12.21	2.62	1.63	-	3.75	0.49
12 – Chrzanów	42.11	34.88	21.86	8.51	8.58	11.48	6.05	3.43	1.77	-	3.44	13.02
13 – Kraków	47.34	37.29	30.56	5.05	7.96	5.70	3.13	3.56	2.86	-	3.89	6.73
14 – Nowy Sącz	45.07	37.17	21.92	8.48	6.00	12.69	8.02	1.22	1.53	-	2.97	15.25
15 – Tarnów	42.76	33.93	20.28	9.88	5.92	12.64	9.34	2.20	1.20	-	4.61	13.65
16 – Płock	36.01	24.20	14.41	17.84	11.94	6.94	15.83	2.93	1.75	-	4.16	6.36
17 – Radom	40.67	25.60	15.62	19.42	9.90	8.07	13.28	2.63	1.09	-	4.39	6.18
18 – Siedlce	41.69	25.46	12.62	18.80	7.27	11.75	16.35	1.87	1.05	-	4.83	6.66
19 – Warsaw I	56.05	29.93	33.07	2.34	11.53	5.85	0.94	6.50	4.91	-	4.93	3.14
20 – Warsaw II	44.71	32.95	28.09	7.34	7.17	7.34	5.46	2.98	2.38	-	6.29	4.86
21 – Opole	33.47	20.53	24.24	10.59	10.39	6.82	4.79	2.80	2.89	12.92	3.03	3.71
22 – Krosno	41.10	33.78	15.44	11.83	9.16	13.63	9.56	2.28	1.07	-	3.25	18.34
23 – Rzeszów	44.24	38.20	16.25	7.89	7.34	13.09	10.24	2.16	0.85	-	3.98	21.95
24 – Białystok	38.41	28.46	15.25	12.16	12.31	11.38	8.39	3.82	1.41	-	6.82	13.21
25 – Gdansk	44.01	25.75	39.90	6.73	9.04	5.61	2.73	3.85	2.20	-	4.19	14.15
26 – Gdynia	42.86	26.83	32.73	9.39	11.22	7.64	2.97	2.92	1.67	-	4.63	5.90
27 – Bielsko-Biała	44.40	35.71	26.55	6.60	9.26	7.90	3.41	3.99	2.91	-	3.67	9.16
28 – Częstochowa	38.62	27.68	24.78	13.73	10.67	6.09	5.70	4.74	2.11	-	4.50	2.90
29 – Gliwice	35.81	28.43	33.12	6.97	11.69	5.34	1.95	3.56	2.44	-	6.50	4.69
30 – Rybnik	39.81	31.33	31.67	7.64	11.65	7.01	2.50	2.56	1.65	-	3.99	0.34
31 – Katowice	41.04	31.33	34.38	5.18	10.51	4.97	1.29	4.62	3.38	-	4.34	3.05
32 – Sosnowiec	36.49	24.27	27.21	-	21.15	7.25	3.59	6.81	2.64	-	7.08	2.94
33 – Kielce	36.53	23.76	15.39	17.23	12.33	6.16	14.15	4.06	1.31	-	5.61	6.53
34 – Elbląg	34.40	21.85	23.48	17.68	12.03	5.58	9.01	3.56	3.09	-	3.72	1.63
35 – Olsztyn	34.54	22.59	24.08	11.80	14.28	7.79	9.44	3.09	2.97	-	3.96	1.49
36 – Kalisz	38.53	20.13	21.72	16.55	13.02	7.47	10.98	4.59	1.39	-	4.15	1.59
37 – Konin	38.27	19.69	18.78	20.70	13.07	6.28	10.19	4.36	1.62	-	5.31	1.10
38 – Piła	39.53	16.93	24.71	14.75	15.82	7.44	9.65	5.84	1.51	-	3.35	7.78
39 – Poznań	47.23	25.55	37.97	5.71	10.48	5.40	2.05	5.41	3.73	-	3.70	12.42
40 – Koszalin	35.57	20.33	21.76	22.78	13.87	4.61	5.25	4.72	3.74	-	2.94	1.02
41 – Szczecin	38.26	23.24	28.21	11.47	14.84	6.11	3.84	5.51	3.02	-	3.76	4.97
Poland	40.57	26.99	24.14	11.41	11.31	7.97	6.96	3.89	2.45	0.29	4.59	2.85

==== Seat distribution by constituency ====
Constituency	PiS	PO	SRP	SLD	LPR	PSL	MN	Sum
1 – Legnica	4	3	2	2	1	-	-	12
2 – Wałbrzych	3	3	1	1	-	-	-	8
3 – Wrocław	5	6	1	1	1	-	-	14
4 – Bydgoszcz	4	3	1	3	1	-	-	12
5 – Toruń	3	3	3	2	1	1	-	13
6 – Lublin	5	3	2	1	2	2	-	15
7 – Chełm	3	1	3	1	2	2	-	12
8 – Zielona Góra	3	4	1	2	1	1	-	12
9 – Łódź	3	3	1	2	1	-	-	10
10 – Piotrków Trybunalski	3	1	2	1	1	1	-	9
11 – Sieradz	3	2	3	2	1	1	-	12
12 – Chrzanów	4	2	-	1	1	-	-	8
13 – Kraków	6	5	-	1	1	-	-	13
14 – Nowy Sącz	4	2	1	-	1	1	-	9
15 – Tarnów	4	2	1	-	1	1	-	9
16 – Płock	3	2	2	1	-	2	-	10
17 – Radom	3	1	2	1	1	1	-	9
18 – Siedlce	4	2	2	1	1	2	-	12
19 – Warsaw I	7	8	-	3	1	-	-	19
20 – Warsaw II	4	4	1	1	1	-	-	11
21 – Opole	3	4	2	1	1	-	2	13
22 – Krosno	4	2	1	1	2	1	-	11
23 – Rzeszów	7	3	1	1	2	1	-	15
24 – Białystok	5	3	2	2	2	1	-	15
25 – Gdańsk	4	6	1	1	-	-	-	12
26 – Gdynia	4	6	1	2	1	-	-	14
27 – Bielsko-Biała	4	3	-	1	1	-	-	9
28 – Częstochowa	3	2	1	1	-	-	-	7
29 – Gliwice	4	4	1	1	-	-	-	10
30 – Rybnik	4	4	-	1	-	-	-	9
31 – Katowice	5	6	-	1	-	-	-	12
32 – Sosnowiec	3	3	-	2	1	-	-	9
33 – Kielce	5	3	3	2	1	2	-	16
34 – Elbląg	2	2	2	1	-	1	-	8
35 – Olsztyn	3	3	1	1	1	1	-	10
36 – Kalisz	3	3	2	2	1	1	-	12
37 – Konin	2	2	3	1	-	1	-	9
38 – Piła	2	3	1	2	-	1	-	9
39 – Poznań	4	5	-	1	-	-	-	10
40 – Koszalin	2	2	3	1	-	-	-	8
41 – Szczecin	4	4	2	2	1	-	-	13
Total	155	133	56	55	34	25	2	460

=== Senate ===
Party	Votes	%	Seats	+/–
Law and Justice	5,020,704	20.80	49	+49
Civic Platform	4,090,497	16.94	34	+32
Democratic Left Alliance	3,114,118	12.90	0	–75
League of Polish Families	2,990,092	12.39	7	+5
Self-Defence of the Republic of Poland	2,016,858	8.35	3	+1
Polish People's Party	1,413,872	5.86	2	–2
Democratic Party	683,799	2.83	0	New
Social Democracy of Poland	573,556	2.38	0	New
Janusz Korwin-Mikke Platform	375,037	1.55	0	New
Centre	246,143	1.02	0	New
Patriotic Movement	234,093	0.97	0	New
Ancestral Home	181,337	0.75	0	New
Polish National Party	168,413	0.70	0	New
German Minority Electoral Committee	88,875	0.37	0	–
All-Poland Civic Coalition	65,561	0.27	0	New
Initiative of the Republic of Poland	45,712	0.19	0	New
Social Rescuers	18,439	0.08	0	New
Polish Labour Party	11,765	0.05	0	–
Polish Confederation – Dignity and Work	10,528	0.04	0	New
Local lists and independents	2,792,572	11.57	5	+3
Total	24,141,971	100.00	100	0
Valid votes	11,812,965	96.52		
Invalid/blank votes	426,054	3.48		
Total votes	12,239,019	100.00		
Registered voters/turnout	30,229,031	40.49		
Source: Nohlen & Stöver

==== By constituency ====
No.	Constituency	Total seats	Seats won					
No.	Constituency	Total seats	PiS	PO	LPR	SRP	PSL	Others
1	Legnica	3	2	1				
2	Wałbrzych	2	1	1				
3	Wrocław	3	1	2				
4	Bydgoszcz	2	2					
5	Toruń	3	1	2				
6	Lublin	3	2		1			
7	Chełm	3	1		1		1	
8	Zielona Góra	3	1	1				1
9	Łódź	2	1	1				
10	Piotrków Trybunalski	2	1			1		
11	Sieradz	3	2	1				
12	Kraków	4	2	2				
13	Nowy Sącz	2	1	1				
14	Tarnów	2	1	1				
15	Płock	2	1	1				
16	Radom	2	1	1				
17	Siedlce	3	2		1			
18	Warsaw	4	2	2				
19	Warsaw	2	1	1				
20	Opole	3	1	2				
21	Krosno	2	2					
22	Rzeszów	3	1		1		1	
23	Białystok	3	1		2			
24	Gdańsk	3	1					2
25	Gdynia	3	2	1				
26	Bielsko-Biała	2	1	1				
27	Częstochowa	2	1					1
28	Gliwice	2	1	1				
29	Rybnik	2	1	1				
30	Katowice	3	1	1				1
31	Sosnowiec	2	1	1				
32	Kielce	3	2	1				
33	Elbląg	2	1	1				
34	Olsztyn	2	1	1				
35	Kalisz	3	1	1		1		
36	Konin	2	1			1		
37	Piła	2		1	1			
38	Poznań	2	1	1				
39	Koszalin	2	1	1				
40	Szczecin	2	1	1				
Total		100	49	34	7	3	2	5
Source: National Electoral Commission

== Aftermath ==
Negotiations between PiS and PO about forming a government collapsed in late October, precipitated by disagreement regarding who would be speaker of the Sejm. On 1 November PiS announced a minority government headed by Kazimierz Marcinkiewicz as Prime Minister. The negotiations were affected by the 9 October presidential election where the PiS candidate Lech Kaczyński (the twin brother of PiS leader Jarosław Kaczyński) was elected; Jarosław Kaczyński had promised that he would not become the Prime Minister if his brother wins the election. The constitutional requirement to form a government within a set time period also heated up the coalition negotiations.

A major stumbling block in PiS-PO government negotiations was the latter's insistence on receiving the Interior portfolio, as to prevent one party from controlling all three of the "power" ministries (Security, Justice and Interior) that manage police and security services. The PO also opposed a "tactical alliance" between the PiS and the Self-Defense (Samoobrona) party, which shared eurosceptic and populist sentiments, although differing on economic policy. The election campaign, in which PiS and PO mainly competed against each other rather than parties to their left, accentuated differences and created an antagonistic relationship between the two parties.

The PiS minority government depended on the support of the radical Samoobrona party and the hard-right League of Polish Families (LPR) to govern, a situation that made many of those hoping for a PiS-PO coalition uneasy. On 5 May 2006 PiS formed a coalition government with Samoobrona and LPR.

In July 2006, Marcinkiewicz tendered his resignation following reports of a rift with PiS party leader Kaczyński. Kaczyński formed a new government and was sworn in on 14 July as prime minister.

The SLD's severe defeat sent the party into a sharp decline from which it has never fully recovered; it lost all of its remaining seats in 2015 though it regained some ground in 2019 as part of Lewica, and the Polish left-wing would not govern until New Left, formed from the merger of the SLD and Spring, entered Tusk's third cabinet as a junior coalition partner following the 2023 parliamentary election.

The 2005 election proved to be a realigning election in Polish politics, as Law and Justice and Civic Platform (and presidential candidates supported by them) have finished in top two of every election since.
