= Opinion polling for the 2005 Polish parliamentary election =

In the run up to the 2005 Polish parliamentary election, various organisations carried out opinion polling to gauge voting intention in Poland. Results of such polls are displayed in this article.

== Graphical summary ==
Graphical summary of opinion polls: Law and Justice Civic Platform Self-Defence Democratic Left Alliance League of Polish Families Polish People's Party Social Democracy Democratic Party Freedom Union (Note: Reformed as the Democratic Party – demokraci.pl in May 2005.) Labour Union (Note: Contested election in the lists of Social Democracy of Poland.)

== Opinion polls ==
=== 2005 ===
Polling Firm/Link	Last Date of Polling	SLD	UP	SDPL	PO	PiS	PSL	SRP	LPR	PD	Others / Don't know	Lead
Election results	September 25, 2005	11.3	3.9		24.1	27	7	11.4	8	2.5	4.9	2.9
TNS OBOP/PBS	September 25, 2005	11.2	3.2		24.1	27.8	5.9	10.4	10.4	2.7	4.3	3.7
Exit polls
TNS OBOP	September 22, 2005	7.6	1.7		28.7	33	5.3	10.3	8.3	2.3	2.8	4.3
PBS	September 21, 2005	7	3		32	30	4	12	8	2	2	2
PGB PBS	September 21, 2005	8	3		29	29	5	10	11	3	2	Tie
Primary election	September 18, 2005	9.0	7.2		26.9	9.8	9.9	15.2	3.3	5.2	10.6	11.7
PGB	September 18, 2005	6	4		33	27	4	10	11	3	2	6
CBOS	September 18, 2005	6	2		33	27	5	12	9	2	5	6
PBS	September 17, 2005	7	3		32	27	4	12	10	3	2	5
PGB	September 13, 2005	11	5		28	21	5	12	12	3	3	7
TNS OBOP	September 12, 2005	9	5		36	23	4	7	8	2	6	13
PBS	September 10, 2005	10	3		35	22	4	10	9	2	5	13
PGB	September 6, 2005	10	4		28	21	4	11	14	4	4	7
PBS	September 4, 2005	11	3		38	23	4	8	7	2	4	15
PGB	August 29, 2005	11	4		24	23	6	10	15	4	3	1
TNS OBOP	August 29, 2005	9	3		29	20	5	10	11	1	12	9
PBS	August 21, 2005	10	4		27	25	4	11	10	3	6	2
PGB	August 15, 2005	8	6		24	20	6	18	13	1	4	4
Ipsos	August 9, 2005	12	4		21	27	5	15	10	1	5	6
CBOS	August 8, 2005	8	3		23	22	7	16	11	3	7	1
TNS OBOP	August 8, 2005	8	6		27	23	4	8	8	3	14	4
PBS	August 7, 2005	7	4		25	22	4	16	11	3	8	3
PGB	July 25, 2005	7	5		24	24	6	17	12	2	3	Tie
PBS	July 17, 2005	12	7		21	25	4	13	9	2	7	4
GfK Polonia	July 17, 2005	10	5		18	20	6	17	9	3	12	2
PGB	July 11, 2005	7	7		21	23	6	14	13	2	7	2
GfK Polonia	July 5, 2005	11	3		18	21	6	15	13	-	13	3
TNS OBOP	July 4, 2005	8	4		21	23	7	18	8	3	8	2
CBOS	July 4, 2005	8	5		21	26	4	14	10	2	10	5
PBS	July 3, 2005	8	3		22	25	4	17	11	3	7	3
PGB	June 27, 2005	6	9		23	23	6	12	15	2	4	Tie
PBS	June 19, 2005	7	6		25	23	4	15	12	3	5	2
Pentor	June 15, 2005	4	7		25	18	4	17	12	4	9	7
PGB	June 13, 2005	5	10		19	22	4	14	14	2	10	3
CBOS	June 6, 2005	6	7		20	23	7	13	14	4	7	3
TNS OBOP	June 6, 2005	6	7		26	18	3	13	12	3	13	8
PBS	June 5, 2005	9	3	4	21	22	4	12	11	4	10	1
GfK Polonia	June 5, 2005	7	4	4	20	22	4	15	10	4	10	2
PGB	May 30, 2005	7	1	8	20	18	6	11	16	3	9	2
PBS	May 22, 2005	8	4	5	18	19	4	16	11	4	11	1
PGB	May 16, 2005	6	2	7	21	20	5	13	14	3	9	1
CBOS	May 9, 2005	7	3	6	25	20	5	14	8	3	9	5
TNS OBOP	May 9, 2005	3	1	9	24	20	8	12	9	4	11	4
PBS	May 8, 2005	6.5	2.3	3.6	21.6	22	6.4	14.5	11	3.9	8.2	0.4
PGB	April 30, 2005	6	1	6	21	21	5	13	16	3	9	Tie
PGB	April 18, 2005	6	1	8	20	18	7	13	14	5	8	2
TNS OBOP	April 17, 2005	3	2	4	26	20	6	10	14	3	12	6
Ipsos	April 14, 2005	7	1	3	19	20	8	16	11	7	8	1
Pentor	April 13, 2005	4	-	4	22	25	5	13	13	4	10	3
CBOS	April 10, 2005	4	3	5	20	24	4	14	10	4	13	4
PBS	April 4, 2005	6	3	3	24	17	4	17	12	5	9	7
PGB	March 22, 2005	8	1	5	23	15	4	16	15	4	9	7
PGB	March 13, 2005	7	2	6	25	15	5	13	15	5	7	10
PBS	March 2005	7	-	3	22	14	5	17	15	6	11	5
TNS OBOP	March 8, 2005	9	1	5	23	12	9	16	10	6	9	7
CBOS	March 7, 2005	6	3	3	22	16	8	14	11	5	12	6
Pentor	March 6, 2005	5	1	5	28	14	4	18	10	6	9	10
PGB	February 26, 2005	7	2	8	25	17	5	12	13	5	6	2
Ipsos	February 15, 2005	8	1	6	24	22	6	15	8	9	1	2
TNS OBOP	February 8, 2005	7	1	7	23	15	7	14	11	4	6	8
CBOS	February 7, 2005	6	4	4	25	15	7	12	13	5	9	10
PGB	January 26, 2005	6	1	8	22	15	6	12	13	4	13	7
CBOS	January 10, 2005	6	3	6	26	18	7	11	12	3	8	8
TNS OBOP	January 10, 2005	9	3	7	20	16	6	11	14	3	11	4
PBS	January 9, 2005	11	4	4	25	14	6	14	12	4	6	11

=== 2004 ===
Polling Firm/Link	Last Date of Polling	SLD	UP	SDPL	PO	PiS	PSL	SRP	LPR	UW	Others / Don't know	Lead
CBOS	December 6, 2004	5	2	4	27	18	6	12	11	3	12	9
TNS OBOP	December 5, 2004	6	2	7	28	14	4	13	13	3	10	14
PGB	November 23, 2004	6	1	7	25	16	7	12	12	4	7	9
CBOS	November 8, 2004	8	2	5	27	17	8	10	12	3	8	10
PBS	November 7, 2004	10	5	5	28	13	6	12	13	4	4	15
TNS OBOP	November 7, 2004	7	2	6	29	12	5	10	13	6	9	16
Pentor	October 10, 2004	7	3	5	27	14	5	12	13	4	10	13
CBOS	October 4, 2004	6	3	4	27	14	6	12	14	6	7	13
Ipsos	September 10, 2004	12	-	3	27	14	5	14	13	6	6	13
CBOS	September 6, 2004	9	4	7	25	15	5	10	13	3	9	10
PBS	September 5, 2004	6	3	5	24	15	5	15	16	4	7	8
TNS OBOP	September 5, 2004	9	2	6	19	12	6	14	15	3	14	4
PGB	August 31, 2004	9		9	24	14	8	12	12	4	9	10
CBOS	August 9, 2004	7	3	7	25	16	6	10	12	4	10	9
TNS OBOP	August 8, 2004	4	1	6	26	12	4	10	12	3	22	14
PGB	July 27, 2004	7		7	25	13	6	13	14	5	10	11
CBOS	July 12, 2004	5	2	4	29	14	6	13	16	5	6	13
TNS OBOP	July 4, 2004	5	2	3	25	13	7	13	15	3	14	10
CBOS	June 2004	6	2	6	28	13	5	17	16	7	0	11
CBOS	June 21, 2004	7	4	4	28	10	7	13	16	3	9	12
TNS OBOP	June 20, 2004	7	1	4	28	13	4	13	13	5	12	15
European Parliament election	June 13, 2004	9.3		5.3	24.1	12.7	6.3	10.8	15.9	7.3	8.2	8.2
PGB	June 9, 2004	7		6	26	13	5	19	12	4	9	7
Ipsos	June 8, 2004	7		9	24	19	7	17	12	-	8	5
Pentor	June 6, 2004	7		5	25	11	6	23	12	4	7	2
TNS OBOP	June 6, 2004	3	6	6	26	10	4	20	12	3	10	6
PBS	May 2004	8		6	26	17	4	21	10	3	5	5
CBOS	May 10, 2004	5	3	5	26	13	8	20	7	3	9	6
Pentor	May 9, 2004	6		7	27	9	6	27	8	2	8	Tie
TNS OBOP	May 9, 2004	5	3	5	26	13	6	17	7	3	13	9
CBOS	May 2004	7	-	6	25	10	6	26	16	-	4	1
PGB	May 4, 2004	5		9	24	13	5	19	13	2	9	5
PGB	April 18, 2004	6		8	24	11	6	24	11	2	8	Tie
Ipsos	April 2004	7		11	23	15	4	25	11	3	1	2
CBOS	April 5, 2004	6	4	7	29	9	5	24	6	2	8	5
PBS	April 4, 2004	7		6	22	10	5	29	9	-	12	7
Pentor	April 4, 2004	6		4	27	10	4	30	7	-	12	3
TNS OBOP	April 4, 2004	4	2	10	33	7	5	24	5	2	8	9
PGB	March 23, 2004	9		-	27	11	7	24	11	3	8	3
CBOS	March 2004	8	2	-	26	9	4	29	10	3	8	3
Ipsos	March 2004	11		-	30	15	7	21	12	-	4	9
CBOS	March 8, 2004	10	3	-	27	15	4	24	7	2	7	3
PBS	March 7, 2004	11		-	26	13	4	24	10	-	12	2
TNS OBOP	March 7, 2004	9	3	-	29	12	6	23	8	2	8	6
CBOS	March 3, 2004	11	3	-	29	10	7	23	9	1	7	6
CBOS	February 2004	12	3	-	29	9	7	19	11	2	6	10
PGB	February 14, 2004	10		-	35	12	6	17	12	3	5	18
CBOS	February 9, 2004	18	3	-	31	10	5	18	8	2	5	13
Pentor	February 8, 2004	12		-	30	12	7	18	7	3	11	12
TNS OBOP	February 8, 2004	12	2	-	24	10	5	23	12	4	8	1
PGB	January 19, 2004	15		-	28	11	8	15	12	4	7	13
TNS OBOP	January 12, 2004	19	2	-	26	10	7	16	10	3	7	7
CBOS	January 12, 2004	17	4	-	29	13	6	11	10	3	8	12

=== 2003 ===
Polling Firm/Link	Last Date of Polling	SLD	UP	PO	PiS	PSL	SRP	LPR	UW	Others / Don't know	Lead
TNS OBOP	December 8, 2003	16	2	20	13	8	16	9	3	13	4
CBOS	December 8, 2003	17	4	26	12	6	13	8	3	10	9
PGB	December 2, 2003	16		25	15	5	15	13	3	8	9
CBOS	December 2, 2003	18	2	26	12	7	12	9	2	6	8
PGB	November 16, 2003	17		19	17	6	15	15	4	7	2
TNS OBOP	November 10, 2003	20	3	21	11	9	13	11	3	9	1
CBOS	November 10, 2003	20	4	22	14	6	14	6	4	8.1	2
TNS OBOP	October 27, 2003	18	6	20	12	7	13	11	3	10	2
TNS OBOP	October 13, 2003	20	4	15	15	8	12	10	5	11	5
TNS OBOP	October 6, 2003	26	3	16	13	8	7	11	5	11	10
CBOS	October 6, 2003	19	5	17	18	10	10	10	3	9	1
TNS OBOP	September 8, 2003	24	4	15	13	12	10	9	3	10	9
CBOS	September 8, 2003	21	5	21	18	7	9	6	4	9	Tie
TNS OBOP	August 25, 2003	25	4	16	11	9	10	12	4	9	9
TNS OBOP	August 11, 2003	23	3	15	14	9	9	13	6	8	8
CBOS	August 4, 2003	21	5	14	15	10	12	6	5	12	6
TNS OBOP	July 7, 2003	21	4	12	14	11	18	8	3	9	3
CBOS	July 7, 2003	25	6	12	12	9	10	9	4	12	13
TNS OBOP	June 16, 2003	27	5	15	12	8	14	8	3	8	12
TNS OBOP	June 9, 2003	22	5	15	18	6	13	9	3	9	4
CBOS	June 1, 2003	21	5	13	16	10	14	8	4	9	5
TNS OBOP	May 12, 2003	25	2	14	15	9	14	8	4	9	10
CBOS	May 12, 2003	21	4	12	18	7	13	10	6	9	3
Demoskop	April 8, 2003	22		10	21	8	20	8	5	6	1
TNS OBOP	April 7, 2003	22	3	13	16	10	18	8	4	6	4
CBOS	April 7, 2003	24	3	14	10	9	17	9	4	9	7
TNS OBOP	March 10, 2003	29	4	9	15	8	14	10	4	7	14
Demoskop	March 10, 2003	34		8	19	11	11	8	6	3	15
PBS	March 9, 2003	29		11	13	7	18	10	3	9	11
CBOS	March 4, 2003	26	3	13	16	8	14	6	5	9	10
PBS	February 9, 2003	31		11	13	7	16	11	4	7	15
TNS OBOP	February 9, 2003	28	4	9	15	8	13	9	5	9	13
CBOS	February 4, 2003	28	3	10	12	8	16	12	3	7	12
Demoskop	January 14, 2003	35		7	15	10	15	11	5	2	20
TNS OBOP	January 12, 2003	38	4	9	9	12	10	7	3	8	26
CBOS	January 6, 2003	30	5	11	13	9	11	8	5	8	17

=== 2002 ===
Polling Firm/Link	Last Date of Polling	SLD	UP	PO	PiS	PSL	SRP	LPR	UW	Others / Don't know	Lead
TNS OBOP	December 9, 2002	25	3	10	15	10	14	13	3	7	10
CBOS	December 2, 2002	33	2	10	12	11	12	10	3	7	21
TNS OBOP	November 25, 2002	27	3	8	14	10	15	12	2	9	12
TNS OBOP	November 14, 2002	31	2	8	13	16	12	7	2	9	21
CBOS	November 11, 2002	30	3	10	13	9	13	11	4	8	17
Local elections	October 27, 2002	24.7		12.1		10.8	16	14.4	2.3	15.9	8.7
TNS OBOP	October 14, 2002	35		10	10	11	14	10	3	7	21
CBOS	October 14, 2002	36	3	12	12	9	11	8	3	6	24
TNS OBOP	October 7, 2002	32		14	13	10	14	9	4	4	18
TNS OBOP	September 23, 2002	37		11	11	9	15	8	4	5	22
TNS OBOP	September 9, 2002	35		10	14	8	10	13	4	6	21
CBOS	September 9, 2002	34	5	10	12	8	14	7	2	8	20
TNS OBOP	August 26, 2002	39		14	9	8	11	9	4	6	25
TNS OBOP	August 5, 2002	31		12	15	9	15	11	3	4	16
CBOS	August 5, 2002	30	4	10	15	10	12	8	5	6	15
TNS OBOP	July 8, 2002	29		13	11	10	14	13	5	5	15
CBOS	July 8, 2002	30	3	12	12	7	17	8	4	6	13
TNS OBOP	June 10, 2002	32		12	12	9	14	9	4	8	18
CBOS	June 10, 2002	31	4	10	14	8	14	8	5	6	17
TNS OBOP	May 27, 2002	34		12	11	8	14	7	5	9	20
TNS OBOP	May 13, 2002	36		11	12	10	12	7	6	6	24
CBOS	May 13, 2002	34	3	11	10	9	13	7	5	8	21
TNS OBOP	April 22, 2002	33		12	11	10	15	9	2	8	18
Demoskop	April 15, 2002	32		11	11	4	10	5	4	23	21
TNS OBOP	April 8, 2002	39		11	11	9	11	7	5	7	28
CBOS	April 8, 2002	33	4	12	11	12	10	6	3	9	21
TNS OBOP	March 11, 2002	37		14	12	9	10	9	2	7	23
CBOS	March 4, 2002	35	2	10	11	9	11	10	3	11	24
TNS OBOP	February 25, 2002	39		11	14	9	11	9	4	3	25
TNS OBOP	February 11, 2002	40		13	10	10	8	8	3	8	27
CBOS	February 4, 2002	47	1	11	9	8	10	7	2	6	36
TNS OBOP	January 14, 2002	42		12	10	8	11	7	3	7	30
CBOS (Note: Until February 2001, CBOS polls did not disregard those polled who said they were still undecided. To ensure consistency, the result of the polls prior to February 2001 has been adjusted to exclude the undecided.)	January 14, 2002	40	3	12	11	8	8	6	3	8	28
PBS	January 2002	44		14	8	7	13	10	-	4	30

=== 2001 ===
Polling Firm/Link	Last Date of Polling	SLD	UP	PO	PiS	PSL	SRP	LPR	UW	Others / Don't know	Lead
TNS OBOP	December 17, 2001	40		13	10	7	11	7	4	8	27
TNS OBOP	December 10, 2001	40		12	6	11	12	8	7	4	28
CBOS	December 10, 2001	40	3	12	13	8	9	7	3	6	27
PBS	December 2001	45		11	8	10	13	7	2	4	32
TNS OBOP	November 26, 2001	40		13	6	9	16	7	1	8	24
TNS OBOP	November 12, 2001	50		10	7	8	12	7	2	4	38
CBOS	November 12, 2001	48		12	7	9	10	7	3	6	36
PBS	November 11, 2001	42		13	7	9	14	8	3	4	28
TNS OBOP	October 22, 2001	46		14	7	9	10	7	3	3	32
CBOS	October 15, 2001	39		14	9	8	12	8	4	6	25
PBS	September 30, 2001	43		13	8	8	15	7	1	5	28
Election results	September 23, 2001	41		12.7	9.5	9	10.2	7.9	3.1	6.7	28.3
