= Polish Confederation – Dignity and Work =

Defunct political party in Poland (2005 to 2007)

Polish Confederation – Dignity and Work Polish: Polska Konfederacja – Godność i Praca
- Abbreviation: PKGiP
- Leader: Adam Słomka; Elżbieta Postulka; Miron Bryk; Tadeusz Bielawski; Zygmunt Miernik
- Founded: 4 June 2005
- Registered: 27 July 2005
- Dissolved: 27 July 2007
- Headquarters: ul. Młyńska 21; 40-098 Katowice
- Membership (2006): 20,000
- Ideology: Left-wing nationalism Patriotic socialism
- Political position: Left-wing
- Colours: Blue

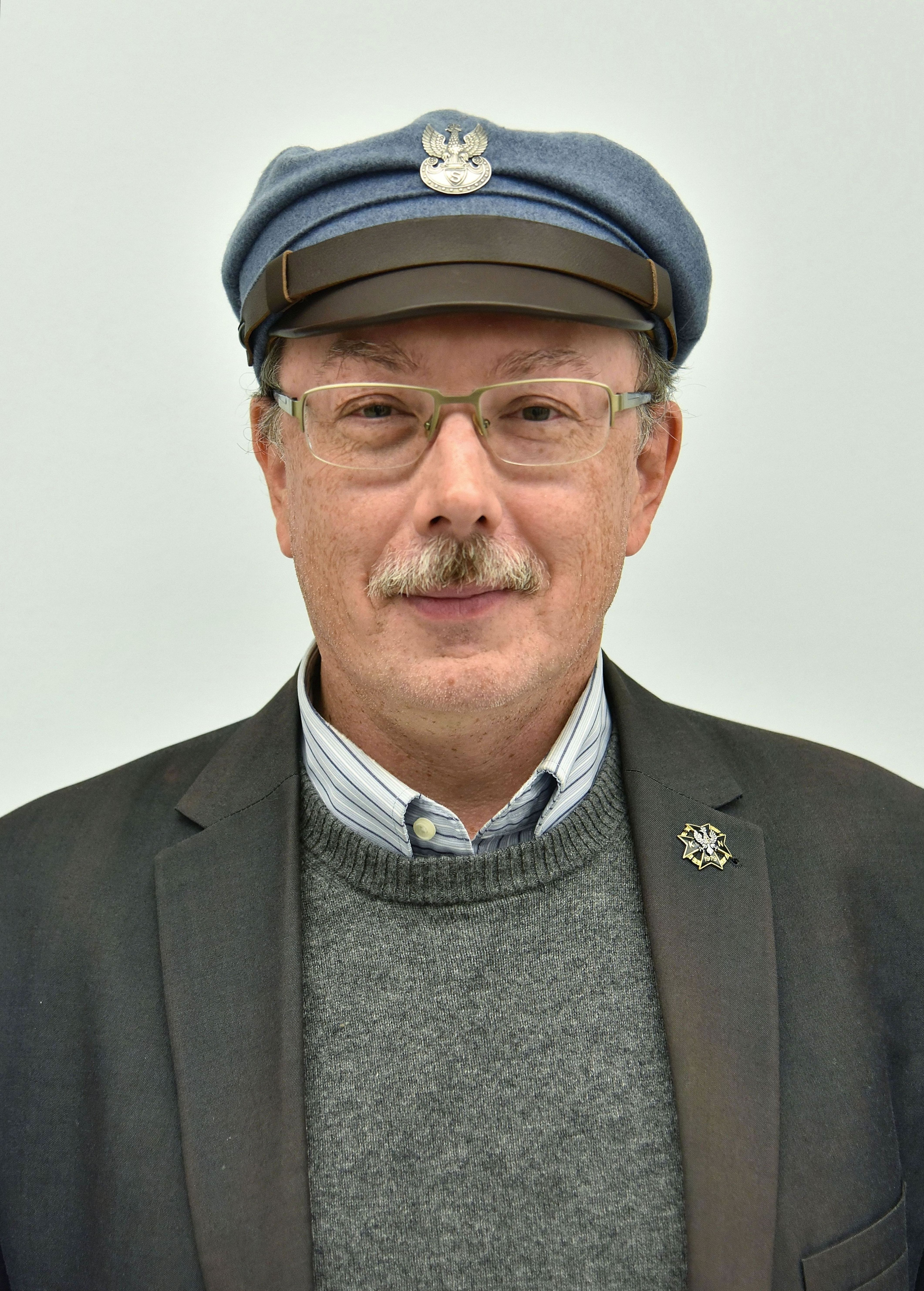
Leader of the party Adam Słomka

Polish Confederation – Dignity and Work (Polish: Polska Konfederacja – Godność i Praca, PKGiP) was a Polish political party that was founded in 2005 in Katowice to participate in the 2005 Polish parliamentary election. It was founded by Adam Słomka, an anti-communist Polish dissident who co-founded the underground, Polish right-wing nationalist party Confederation of Independent Poland in 1979. However, by 2005 Słomka had a change of heart, declared that he has become left-wing and founded the Polish Confederation – Dignity and Work as a way to provide a left-wing alternative to the social-democratic Democratic Left Alliance of Włodzimierz Cimoszewicz and the far-left populist party of Andrzej Lepper, Self-Defence of the Republic of Poland.

The Polish Confederation – Dignity and Work presented itself as the "patriotic left" and "traditional left", arguing that the left-wing parties of 2000s Poland failed to live up to their promises and were manipulating voters. The party argued that it wanted to build a leftist alternative "in the style of Józef Piłsudski", evoking the socialist past of Piłsudski as the main inspiration of the party's program. The main focus of PKGiP was the unemployed, the elderly, the pensioners as well as veterans, and the party formed alliances with organizations representing such groups. The party participated in the 2005 Polish parliamentary election as well as the 2005 Polish presidential election, where it won less than 0,1% of the popular vote. After the disappointing performance in the 2005 elections, it was dissolved in 2007.

== History ==
The party was founded by Adam Słomka, an anti-communist Polish dissident who was an activist in the right-wing nationalist underground party Confederation of Independent Poland since its foundation in 1979. After the fall of Communist Poland, Słomka was a deputy of the Sejm between 1991 and 1997 as a member of the Confederation of Independent Poland. In 1996 he rebelled against the leader of the party Leszek Moczulski and founded a splinter party Confederation of Independent Poland - Patriotic Camp (Polish: Konfederacja Polski Niepodległej – Obóz Patriotyczny). Słomka accused Moczulski of turning the Confederation of Independent Poland into a "family party", which became dominated by Moczulski and his son-in-law - Krzysztof Król.

As the leader of the Confederation of Independent Poland - Patriotic Camp, Słomka greatly moderated himself and joined the centre-right grand coalition Solidarity Electoral Action, becoming one of the 201 Sejm deputies of the coalition in the 1997 Polish parliamentary election. Słomka lost his seat in the 2001 Polish parliamentary election, when the increasingly unpopular Solidarity-led government caused the coalition to fall below the 8% electoral threshold for coalitions; the 2001 election was a victory for the post-communist parties such as the social-democratic Democratic Left Alliance and (back then) left-wing agrarian Polish People's Party, as well as extremist formations like the far-left Self-Defence of the Republic of Poland and the far-right League of Polish Families.

In the 2002 Polish local elections, Słomka unsuccessfully tried to become the president of Katowice. After Słomka's failure to win a seat in the 2001 election, he also struggled with finding a job and became unemployed. This gave rise to the idea of establishing a movement for the rights of the unemployed. He then joined the National Movement for the Defense of the Unemployed (Polish: Ogólnopolski Ruch Obrony Bezrobotnych), and ran on its list in the 2004 European Parliament election in Poland. However, the movement only won 0,61% of the popular and did not win any seats. For the presidential and parliamentary elections in 2005, Słomka founded his new own party on 4 June 2005 - Polish Confederation – Dignity and Work, which was to represent the interests of the disadvantaged people at large. The party was a merger of the following parties and organizations:

- Confederation of Independent Poland (Polish: Konfederacja Polski Niepodległej) - right-wing nationalist party in which Słomka started his political career;
- Confederation of Independent Poland - Patriotic Camp (Polish: Konfederacja Polski Niepodległej - Obóz Patriotyczny) - Słomka's splinter party that moved sharply left;
- National Movement for the Defense of the Unemployed (Polish: Ogólnopolski Ruch Obrony Bezrobotnych) - anti-austerity unemployed' rights movement;
- Polish Reason of State (Polish: Stronnictwo Polska Racja Stanu) - minor Catholic nationalist party;
- National Union of the Elderly, Pensioners and Veterans (Polish: Krajowa Wspólnota Emerytytów, Rencistów i Kombatantów);
- Porozumienie Organizacji Niepodległościowych (Polish: Agreement of Independence Organizations);
- Forum of Entrepreneurs (Polish: Forum Przedsiębiorców) - a minor trade union.

Almost two months later, the party was registered on 27 July 2005. Słomka announced that the party will be left-wing and that he has likewise become a leftist, abandoning his erstwhile right-wing views. He boasted his experience and pure credentials, stating that he had been in the Confederation of Independent Poland for 26 years and has never been a part of a ruling government, and that he was not at the Round Table Agreement either. Słomka introduced his party as a "patriotic leftist" movement that aspired to become "an heir to the political thought of Józef Piłsudski". Słomka also launched Konfederat, the party's magazine. Słomka's left-wing turn was also characterized by the abandonment of anti-communist positions - he condemned the lustration law that would ban former communist public servants from government positions as "a political abomination and moral wickedness".

The party ran a traditional campaign, avoiding television and radio in favor of direct meetings with the voters, posters, and setting up tables in towns and cities with information on the party's program. This strategy, however, proved to be misplaced - in the 2005 parliamentary election, the party won 8353 (0,07% of the popular vote) votes for the Sejm and 10528 (0,04% of the popular vote) for the Senate. Similarly, in the 2005 presidential election, Słomka took last place, winning 8895 votes, which amounted to 0,06% of the popular vote.

Słomka's poor showing in the presidential election marked the decline of the party - Słomka's party managed to gather 136,000 signatures in favor of his candidacy, while less than 9000 voters voted for him. One of the factors that led to this failure was divisions within the party - the National Movement for the Defense of the Unemployed protested Słomka's decision to run under the name of Polish Confederation – Dignity and Work rather than under the name of their organization, accusing Słomka of "being embarrassed of the unemployed". Słomka reportedly answered that his decision to use the party's name for his candidacy was only on "sociotechnical" grounds. He endorsed Lech Kaczyński of Law and Justice in the second round. Słomka himself stated before the results that he was not running to win, but to present his "left-wing patriotic" vision to the country and to provide a leftist alternative to voters. After the results, Słomka said that his "minimum goal" had been reached, and stated: "We had to check the state of democracy in Poland. We showed how the election campaign in Poland looks like, how it deviates from democratic standards. This is a great success because we showed this to millions of people. Secondly, we checked our own capabilities, our own structures, we showed what we can do, and I think this is a good start for the next campaign."

The last election the Polish Confederation – Dignity and Work participated in was the 2006 Polish local elections, in which the party fielded 93 candidates to local sejmiks, but failed to win a seat, winning 19,153 votes in total (less than 0,01%). On 14 July 2006, Słomka was arrested under suspicion of “directing an organized criminal group whose goal was to commit crimes against elections.” The Polish Confederation – Dignity and Work were accused of forging voters' signatures, and of providing food benefits to voters with donations sfrom the European Union. The coordinators of the party allegedly distributed aid and promised additional aid for voting for the party's candidates. On 2 August, Słomka was released and was allowed to remain free for the remainder of the investigation. His party was subsequently dissolved on 27 July 2007, exactly two years after its registration.

== Election results ==
=== Sejm ===
Election	Votes	%	Seats	+/–
2005	8353	0.07 (#19)	0 / 460	New

=== Senate ===
Election	Votes	%	Seats	+/–
2005	10 528	0.04 (#9)	0 / 100	New

=== Presidential ===
Election	Candidate	First round		Second round	
Election	Candidate	Votes	%	Votes	%
2005	Adam Słomka	8895	0.06 (#12)	Endorsed Lech Kaczyński	

=== Regional assemblies ===
Election	Votes	%	Seats	+/–
2006	19 153	0.001	0 / 561	New

== Ideology ==
The Polish Confederation – Dignity and Work was a left-wing patriotic formation, declaring commitment to left-wing nationalism as well as patriotic socialism, which it considered Józef Piłsudski as a model of. Appealing to the left-wing periods of Piłsudski's life was the main focus of the party, as the party called itself "patriotic left" and "traditional left", evoking Piłsudski's past in the Polish Socialist Party. The leader of the party, Adam Słomka, listed "dignified Poland, dignified work, dignified life" as the most important goals of the party.

The party used populist language, calling the political elites of Poland "undignified". Economically, the party focused on proposals centered around reducing unemployment and aiding the poorest groups of the Polish society. The Polish Confederation – Dignity and Work frequently attacked its left-wing opponents, which it identified as Self-Defence of the Republic of Poland and Democratic Left Alliance; Słomka accused both parties of manipulating voters and failing to live up to their own standards.

Speaking of the party's program, Słomka declared: “We want people to be proud of Poland, so that they don't have to leave the country.” He proposed a state-owned economy based on subsidiarity, in which the state would promote and organize an economy based on small and family-run workplaces. The party also promoted mass construction of social, state-owned housing. Despite its left-wing nationalist orientation, the party was optimistic about globalization, arguing that it could improve living standards and foster community ties if technologically advances are state-controlled and directed.

The party particularly attacked the populist rhetoric of Self-Defence, claiming that Self-Defence was allegedly complicit in the 1990s Polish cabinets and the austerity policies that were enacted. Adam Słomka contrasted this with his own record, portraying himself and his party as experienced and uncorrupted by power. Słomka accentuated that he had been a member of the Confederation of Independent Poland for 26 years, and that he was never a part of a governing cabinet, and that he was not present nor in agreement with the Round Table Agreements from 1989. Despite his anti-communist background, Słomka and his party also opposed the lustration law, which would ban former communist officials from public positions, calling such anti-communist bills a "political abomination and moral wickedness."

The program of the party focused on the rights and wellbeing of the unemployed, veterans, the elderly and pensioners, describing these groups as particularly disadvantaged and in need of an extensive safety net that could provide for them. The party also campaigned on other matters - it declared itself for abolishing conscription in favor of a scrictly voluntary and professional military force, and it called for withdrawal of Polish troops from Iraq. Lastly, it proposed slashing bureaucracy in judicial system, proposing that court trials be conducted day after another until the verdict is reached, as opposed to breaking down the trial to several meetings separated by months or years.

== See also ==
- Self-Defence of the Republic of Poland
- League and Self-Defence
- Alternative Social Movement
- Polish Labour Party - August 80
- Social Justice Movement
