= Initiative of the Republic of Poland =

Former Polish political party

Initiative of the Republic of Poland Inicjatywa Rzeczpospolitej Polskiej
- Leader: Zbigniew Łuczak
- Founded: 28 May 2004; 21 years ago
- Registered: 7 September 2004; 20 years ago
- Dissolved: 11 October 2010; 14 years ago
- Split from: Self Defence RP
- Headquarters: ul. Meisnera 8 m. 20, 03-982 Warsaw
- Membership (2004): 1000
- Ideology: Socialism; Decentralization; Agrarianism
- Political position: Centre-left

The Initiative of the Republic of Poland (Polish: Inicjatywa Rzeczpospolitej Polskiej), often shortened to Initiative RP (Polish: Inicjatywa RP) and IRP, was a short-lived centre-left agrarian and socialist Polish political party. It was founded on 28 May 2004 in Łódź by former activists of Samoobrona RP, mainly from the Łódzkie and Mazowieckie Voivodeships. It existed until 2010.

The party was one of many minor parties that seceded from Self-Defence of the Republic of Poland throughout the 2000s. However, Initiative RP maintained the party program of Self-Defence and wanted to uphold it. Formed by a few working-class local councillors, the party was concerned about Self-Defence's inability to carry out its postulates but had friendly relations with its mother party.

== History ==
In April 2004, Zbigniew Łuczak, the leader of the Łódź Self-Defence of the Republic of Poland party, along with several colleagues left the party and created a new party. Before leaving Self-Defence, Łuczak was known for his role in numerous agrarian and farmer protests and blockades organized in Łódź and neighbouring villages.

Apart from Łuczak, the party was composed of three Samoobrona councillors from Łódź - Ewa Modrzejewska, Barbara Pawlowska and Krzysztof Madej. The party was later joined by Halina Rusek from the social democratic Democratic Left Alliance. Initiative RP condemned Democratic Left Alliance and ruled out ever entering coalition talks with them, citing their role in breaking up farmer protests. The party had 1000 members in 2004.

Łuczak was unemployed at the time of creating the party, losing his job after long sickness. A few months after founding the party, he became employed at the Łódź Group Sewage Treatment Plan for 2500 PLN a month - a low, working-class pay. Despite his financial situation, Łuczak asserted that it will not affect the ability of Initiative RP to function.

In the 4th Sejm of the Republic of Poland, the party had 2 deputies, Waldemar Borczyk and Zbigniew Dziewulski. For the 2005 Polish parliamentary election, it registered lists in 17 electoral districts.

However, shortly before the 2005 election, one of two MPs of the party Waldemar Borczyk was arrested for drunk driving and assaulting a police officer. Borczyk argued that the whole situation was a provocation by his former colleagues from Samoobrona, which he was expelled from in 2004 for "dishonorable behavior". Borczyk admitted that he had alcohol problems. Party leader Łuczak announced that he was familiar with the personal problems of Borczyk and promised to hold him accountable.

The scandal made the party unable to gain any momentum in the election. While the party was able to form an independent electoral committee, it only received 11 914 votes (0.10% nationwide) in total. After Zbigniew Dziewulski's defeat in the Senate elections, the party lost political significance and was marginalised.

On 11 October 2010, it was deregistered.

== Ideology ==
The party described itself as centre-left, and mostly kept to the program of Self-Defence of the Republic of Poland which it seceded from, with agrarianism and socialism being the main postulates of the party. Initiative of the Republic of Poland praised the program of Self-Defence, but argued that it is not being implemented. Leader of the party, Zbigniew Łuczak, remarked that to realise its socialist goals, Self-Defence "can't ride on a single horse of discontent or solve problems with roadblocks alone." Another important proposal of the party was decentralization; the party wanted to greatly strengthen the power of local governments and council at expense of the central government, arguing for the importance of localism and regionalism.

Initiative of the Republic of Poland argued that socialism and not capitalism is what is necessary to lift the Polish countryside out of poverty and stop what it considered constant circles of crises. Łuczak was particularly known for his dedication to agrarian interests and farmers' protests, which shaped his political image. He also condemned the social-democratic Democratic Left Alliance, stating that he could never cooperate with a party responsible for breaking up farmers' protests.

The group aimed to combat corruption, generate three million new jobs through public works, establish a universal healthcare system free of charge, and ensure that all European Union funds were directed towards welfare and anti-poverty initiatives. Emphasizing social justice and welfare as its primary goals, the party leader expressed, "Our mission is to challenge injustices and irrationalities." One of them is that a single mother gets a benefit of 170 PLN, while at the same time the father of the child in prison is maintained by the state for 1,100 PLN a month."

== See also ==
- Self-Defence of the Republic of Poland
- Polish Initiative
- Initiative for Poland
- Social Justice Movement
- Democratic Left Alliance
