= Democratic Party – demokraci.pl =

Democratic Party Partia Demokratyczna – demokraci.pl
- Leader: Elżbieta Bińczycka
- Founded: 7 May 2005
- Dissolved: 12 November 2016
- Preceded by: Freedom Union
- Succeeded by: Union of European Democrats
- Headquarters: ul. Marszałkowska 77/79, 00–683 Warsaw
- Ideology: Social liberalism
- Political position: Centre
- National affiliation: Left and Democrats (2006–08)
- European affiliation: Alliance of Liberals and Democrats for Europe
- Colours: Orange

Website
- www.demokraci.pl

The Democratic Party (Polish: Partia Demokratyczna – demokraci.pl), abbreviated to PD, was a minor social liberal political party in Poland. It had no members of the Sejm, Senate, or European Parliament.

Its foundation was publicly announced on 28 February 2005 and formally established on 9 May 2005 as an 'enlargement' of the Freedom Union, which it legally succeeded. At the 2007 election to the Sejm, the party ran as part of the Left and Democrats (LiD) list, and won three of the alliance's 53 seats. These members left the party in 2009 to join the newly revived Democratic Party. The party was dissolved on 12 November 2016 to form Union of European Democrats.

The party was a member of the Alliance of Liberals and Democrats for Europe (ALDE) Party.

== History ==
=== Foundation ===
The Democratic Party was formed on the initiative of Freedom Union chairman Władysław Frasyniuk, together with the social-democratic economist Jerzy Hausner, until recently a member of the governing post-communist Democratic Left Alliance (SLD), and prominent Christian democrat, former UW member Tadeusz Mazowiecki. It was since strongly supported, but thus far not yet officially joined, by then Prime Minister Marek Belka and centrist members of the Democratic Left Alliance. Although it attracted considerable media attention and support from many Polish intellectuals, it received only 2.5% of the vote (and no seats in parliament) in the Polish parliamentary election in October 2005.

=== Characteristics ===
The core of the Democratic Party is made up by the members of the Freedom Union (Unia Wolności, UW), which had so far been the most important Christian democratic group in the Polish political landscape. Since its inception in 1994, the UW had to cope with internal frictions between various factions: liberals (such as Leszek Balcerowicz), those proposing a more liberal economic agenda in a more conservative, bourgeois guise (such as Donald Tusk), more progressive social democrats such as Jacek Kuroń, and intellectual former civil rights activists such as Bronisław Geremek or Tadeusz Mazowiecki, who also has a strong background in liberal Catholicism and leans towards Christian democracy.

In 2001, these frictions – combined with the prospect of a devastating defeat in the upcoming election – led to an exodus of conservative and liberal conservative members around Tusk who joined former members of the UW's senior coalition partner, the conservative Solidarity Electoral Action, to form the new party Civic Platform.

=== 2001 Election failure ===
In the 2001 general elections, the Freedom Union received only 3.1% and thus failed to cross the 5% threshold required to gain entry to Parliament. With Władysław Frasyniuk replacing Geremek as chairman, the Freedom Union continued to exist as a centrist party, but lost much of its relevance in Polish politics. It was enjoying the support of approximately 3% of voters, to fall to 1% and below in 2009.

=== European election success ===
However, probably due to low voter turnout, the party managed to cross the required 5% threshold in the 2004 European Parliament elections, receiving 7% of votes and 4 out of 54 seats reserved for Poland in the European Parliament as part of the Alliance of Liberals and Democrats for Europe Party, of which it is a member.

=== After 2005 ===
On 29 February 2005, Frasyniuk came out with the initiative to merge the UW into a new social-liberal party to be called "the Democrats", which he presented with Mazowiecki and Jerzy Hausner. Mazowiecki had left the UW in November 2002 after it had left the conservative and Christian democratic European People's Party in favour of the Alliance of Liberals and Democrats for Europe Party, and entered coalitions with the social-democratic Democratic Left Alliance and the far-left populist Self-Defence of the Republic of Poland party on the local level.

=== Alliance with postcommunists ===
Hausner, on the other hand, is an economist with a post-communist background. As minister of economic affairs and employment in the governments of Leszek Miller and Marek Belka, he conceived the so-called Hausner Plan (Plan Hausnera), a programme for market-socialist reform concerning state-owned business, public administration, and social security. After his reform met with persistent opposition, he left the SLD in a much debated move on 7 February 2005 and resigned from office on 30 March 2005.

From the beginning, Frasyniuk, Hausner and Mazowiecki appealed to Prime Minister Marek Belka to join the party. Belka, another former SLD member, had left the party in the early 1990s, but joined Leszek Miller's government as a non-party minister of economic affairs in 2001 before resigning the following year. After an interlude as economic director in the interim coalition administration of Iraq in 2003, Belka returned to Poland to become non-party head of an SLD minority government in 2004.

The involvement of Hausner and Belka as prominent post-communists marks a first in Polish politics: for the first time, a political party is created by members of the former communist government and former opposition members. Also, while the UW was a somewhat elitist party appealing mostly to educated and affluent urban voters, the PD is trying to establish itself as a populist party with a broad appeal, which caters for centrist social-liberals (Frasyniuk), pragmatic centrists with leanings toward economic liberalism (Hausner) and centrist Christian democrats (Mazowiecki).

As of 27 May 2005, the party claimed to have 13,000+ members, out of which 8,000 were members of the Freedom Union. It defined itself as, "above all, a group of young people not previously involved in politics, which at the same time is drawing on the best traditions of the liberal-democratic milieu around the Freedom Union" . Despite this statement the party is made of several former politicians, who had run Poland before, as well as including ex-members of SLD who left the party when it faced a corruption crisis.

A manifesto entitled "Development through Democracy" issued by the party in February 2005 was signed by a broad range of Polish intellectuals and artists, including Paweł Huelle (writer), Marek Edelman (physician, last surviving leader of the Warsaw Ghetto Rising), Agnieszka Holland (director), Marek Kondrat (actor), Kazimierz Kutz (director), Jan Miodek (linguist), Daniel Olbrychski (actor), Jerzy Pilch (writer), Henryk Samsonowicz (historian), Jerzy Szacki (sociologist). Lech Wałęsa's son Jarosław Wałęsa also signed the manifesto.

=== After 2006 ===
In 2006, the party created the Left and Democrats (LiD) political coalition with the Democratic Left Alliance, Social Democracy of Poland and Labour Union. It continued to join the coalition for the parliamentary elections 2007. It gained 3 parliamentary seats in the lower chamber of Polish Diet. The coalition was ended in March 2008, and 3 democratic members of parliament formed their own parliamentary group.

The Democrats gathered only 25,937 votes in the 2009 European elections, reaching similar support as the newly founded Polish green party Greens 2004. This outcome was seen as a defeat. In June 2009 two of the elected parliamentarists left the party. On 10 January, Brygida Kuźniak became a new leader of Democrats, beating former deputy leader Bogdan Lis. Currently, also the third parliamentarist switched to the Democratic Party (Stronnictwo Demokratyczne), as well as many prominent leaders that do not share the new shift in party's ideology.

The party joined the Europa Plus political alliance on 24 June 2013.

On 12 November 2016, the party was dissolved and merged with the European Democrats club at the Sejm to form a new party called Union of European Democrats, which is generally less progressive and more moderate conservative than Democratic Party was.

== Ideology ==
The party was a direct successor of the Freedom Union and attempted to extend the original voter coalition of the Freedom Union by left-leaning voter groups. The party wanted to appeal to the urban, liberal middle class, and its proposals included a creation of a special metropolitan voivodeship for Warsaw. At the same time, it worked with social democratic parties, such as the Democratic Left Alliance and Social Democracy of Poland, although there were few proposals all three parties agreed to, such as the need to bail out indebted hospitals and to build an anti-missile shield in Poland. The Democratic Party however also stressed its distance to centre-left parties, and stressed its ideological centrism.

The ideology of the party was social liberalism.

Key proposals of the party include:

- Support for the European constitution in the referendum in October 2005
- Tax cuts, introduction of an 18% flat tax on incomes
- Reduction of non-wage labour costs, tax remissions for business starters
- Creation of new jobs, e.g. through a first-year exemption from social security contributions for graduate entrants
- Appointment of an ombudsman to represent entrepreneurs damnified by fiscal or other authorities
- Increased spending on education
- Studentship funds for rural youth
- Compulsory education starting at age 6 (presently 7), popularisation of instruction in two foreign languages at primary school level
- Improvement and nationwide standardisation of health services
- Establishment of a public hospital network not subject to privatisation
- Reduction in telecommunication costs to facilitate Internet access

== Popular support ==
The Freedom Union's transformation into the Democratic Party has not significantly increased voter support for the centrists, which since autumn 2004 has been oscillating between 3% and 6%. In June 2005, it was at 4% and has since deteriorated; in the parliamentary elections of September 2005, it reached 2.5%, failing to overcome the election threshold of 5%. Because the party received less than 3%, it does not receive refunds of its campaign costs. It also lacks significant presence in the media as a consequence of its poor election result, which has further diminished its appeal. In December 2005, the party merely reached 1% of support in a poll. As a result, some political observers question the party's ability to further continue in its present shape.

=== Sejm ===
Election year	# of votes	% of vote	# of overall seats won	+/–
2005	289,276	2.5 (#8)	0 / 460	Steady
2007	2,122,981	13.2 (#3)	3 / 460	▲3
As part of the Left and Democrats coalition, which won 53 seats in total.

=== Senate ===
Election year	# of overall seats won	+/–
2005	0 / 100	▼5
2007	0 / 100	Steady
2011	0 / 100	Steady
2015	0 / 100	Steady

== Criticism ==
The Democratic Party has attracted criticism from other former oppositionists from communist times, who criticise that the party accepts former members of the post-communist SLD, and strongly opposes the large-scale vetting of officials and politicians (see Bronisław Wildstein) aimed at eliminating former state agents from political life. Also, the party's formal electoral and later parliamentary coalition with SLD, Left and Democrats, which lasted from 2006 until 2008, has been seen as disloyalty of Solidarity's ideals by many.

== See also ==
- Liberalism in Poland
- Liberalism
- Contributions to liberal theory
- Liberalism worldwide
- List of liberal parties
- Liberal democracy
