= Sejm Constituency no. 27 =

Polish parliamentary constituency

Sejm Constituency no. 27 Bielsko-Biała I
- Okręg wyborczy nr 27; Bielsko-Biała I
- Constituency for the Sejm
- Location within Poland.
- Counties: Bielsko, Bielsko-Biała, Cieszyn, Pszczyna, Żywiec
- Voivodeship: Silesian

Current constituency
- Created: 2001
- Deputies: 9
- Regional assembly: Silesian Voivodeship Sejmik
- Senate constituency: 78 and 79
- EP constituency: Silesian

Sejm Constituency no. 27 (Polish: Okręg wyborczy nr 27) is a Polish constituency of the Sejm in the Silesian Voivodeship, electing nine deputies. It consists of counties of Bielsko, Bielsko-Biała, Cieszyn, Pszczyna and Żywiec. Constituency Electoral Commission's seat is the city of Bielsko-Biała.

== List of deputies ==
Deputies of the 10th Sejm (2023–2027)
Deputy	Party	Parliamentary group
Grzegorz Puda	Law and Justice	Law and Justice
Stanisław Szwed	Law and Justice	Law and Justice
Przemysław Drabek	Law and Justice	Law and Justice
Grzegorz Gaża	Law and Justice	Law and Justice
Mirosława Nykiel	Civic Platform	Civic Coalition
Małgorzata Pępek	Civic Platform	Civic Coalition
Apoloniusz Tajner	Independent	Civic Coalition
Mirosław Suchoń	Poland 2050	Poland 2050
Bronisław Foltyn	New Hope	Confederation
