= Sejm Constituency no. 20 =

Polish parliamentary constituency

Sejm Constituency no. 20 Warsaw II
- Okręg wyborczy nr 20; Warszawa II
- Constituency for the Sejm
- Counties: Grodzisk, Legionowo, Nowy Dwór, Otwock, Piaseczno, Pruszków, Warsaw West, and Wołomin
- Voivodeship: Masovian
- Electorate: 896,957 (2023)

Current constituency
- Created: 2001
- Seats: 12
- Regional assembly: Masovian Voivodeship Sejmik
- Senate constituency: no. 40 and 41
- EP constituency: Warsaw

The Sejm Constituency no. 20 (Polish: okręg wyborczy nr 20 do Sejmu RP) is an electoral district for the lower house of the parliament of Poland, the Sejm. Located within the Masovian Voivodeship, it encompasses the counties of the Warsaw metropolitan area adjacent to and surrounding the city of Warsaw, which constitutes a separate Sejm Constituency no. 19. Despite this, the seat of the constituency's electoral commission is located in Warsaw and is therefore also designated as Warsaw II.

The constituency elects twelve members of the Sejm and its population was 1,127,706, of which 876,706 were eligible voters, at the 2023 election. Constituency's area comprises the counties: Grodzisk, Legionowo, Nowy Dwór, Otwock, Piaseczno, Pruszków, Warsaw West, and Wołomin.

The constituency is often referred to by media as obwarzanek due to its geographic shape.

== Elections ==
=== 2015 ===
2015 parliamentary election
Party	Votes	%	Seats
Law and Justice	190,355	38.80	6
Civic Platform	123,227	25.12	4
Modern	49,098	10.01	1
Kukiz'15	35,418	7.22	1
United Left	27,774	5.66	0
KORWiN	23,586	4.81	0
Together	18,895	3.85	0
Polish People's Party	18,666	3.80	0
Zbigniew Stonoga's party	3,597	0.73	0
Total	490,616	100.00	12
Valid votes	490,616	98.21	
Invalid/blank votes	8,960	1.79	
Total votes	499,576	100.00	
Registered voters/turnout	832,675	60.00	
Source: National Electoral Commission

=== 2019 ===
2019 parliamentary election
Party	Votes	%	Seats
Law and Justice	244,823	40.89	6
Civic Coalition	171,286	28.61	4
The Left	78,348	13.09	1
Polish People's Party	51,484	8.60	1
Confederation	39,675	6.63	0
Nonpartisans and Local Government Activists	13,111	2.19	0
Total	598,727	100.00	12
Valid votes	598,727	99.12	
Invalid/blank votes	5,333	0.88	
Total votes	604,060	100.00	
Registered voters/turnout	856,128	70.56	
Source: National Electoral Commission

=== 2023 ===
2023 parliamentary election
Party	Votes	%	Seats
Civic Coalition	257,470	35.23	4
Law and Justice	231,905	31.74	4
Third Way	110,086	15.06	2
Confederation	51,573	7.06	1
The Left	51,556	7.06	1
Nonpartisan Local Government Activists	16,571	2.27	0
There is One Poland	11,583	1.59	0
Total	730,744	100.00	12
Valid votes	730,744	98.93	
Invalid/blank votes	7,921	1.07	
Total votes	738,665	100.00	
Registered voters/turnout	896,957	82.35	
Source: National Electoral Commission

== List of members ==
Deputies for the 10th Sejm (2023–2027)
Deputy	Party	Parliamentary group
Mariusz Błaszczak	Law and Justice	Law and Justice
Dominika Chorosińska	Law and Justice	Law and Justice
Anita Czerwińska	Law and Justice	Law and Justice
Piotr Uściński	Law and Justice	Law and Justice
Kinga Gajewska	Civic Platform	Civic Coalition
Jan Grabiec	Civic Platform	Civic Coalition
Piotr Kandyba	Civic Platform	Civic Coalition
Maciej Lasek	Civic Platform	Civic Coalition
Joanna Wicha	Left Together	The Left
Paweł Zalewski	Poland 2050	Poland 2050
Bożena Żelazowska	Polish People's Party	Polish People's Party
Karina Bosak	Independent	Confederation
