= Sejm Constituency no. 40 =

Polish parliamentary constituency

Sejm Constituency no. 40 Koszalin
- Okręg wyborczy nr 40; Koszalin
- Constituency for the Sejm
- Location within Poland.
- Counties: Białogard, Choszczno, Drawsko, Kołobrzeg, Koszalin (city county), Koszalin (land county), Sławno, Szczecinek, Świdwin, Wałcz
- Voivodeship: West Pomeranian

Current constituency
- Created: 2001
- Deputies: 8
- Senate constituencies: 99 and 100
- EP constituency: Lubusz and West Pomeranian

The Sejm Constituency no. 40 (Polish: Okręg wyborczy nr 40) is a constituency of the Sejm (lower house of the Polish parliament) in the West Pomeranian Voivodeship, electing eight deputies. It consists of the city county of Koszalin and the land counties of Białogard, Choszczno, Drawsko, Kołobrzeg, Koszalin, Sławno, Szczecinek, Świdwin and Wałcz. Constituency Electoral Commission's seat is the city of Koszalin.

== List of deputies ==
Deputies of the 9th Sejm (2019–2023)
Deputy	Party
Małgorzata Golińska	Law and Justice
Czesław Hoc	Law and Justice
Paweł Szefernaker	Law and Justice
Jerzy Hardie-Douglas	Civic Platform (Note: Member of the Civic Coalition parliamentary group.)
Marek Hok	Civic Platform
Piotr Zientarski	Civic Platform
Radosław Lubczyk	Centre for Poland (Note: Member of the Polish Coalition parliamentary group.)
Małgorzata Prokop-Paczkowska	New Left (Note: Member of The Left parliamentary group.)
