= Sejm Constituency no. 31 =

Parliamentary constituency in Poland

Sejm Constituency no. 31 Katowice
- Okręg wyborczy nr 31; Katowice
- Constituency for the Sejm
- Location within Poland.
- Counties: Bieruń-Lędziny, Chorzów, Katowice, Mysłowice, Piekary Śląskie, Ruda Śląska, Siemianowice Śląskie, Świętochłowice, Tychy
- Voivodeship: Silesian

Current constituency
- Created: 2001
- Seats: 12
- Regional assembly: Silesian Voivodeship Sejmik
- Senate constituency: 74, 75 and 80
- EP constituency: Silesian

Sejm Constituency no. 31 is a constituency of the Sejm (lower house of Polish parliament) in the Silesian Voivodeship, electing twelve deputies. It covers area of counties: Bieruń-Lędziny, Chorzów, Katowice, Mysłowice, Piekary Śląskie, Ruda Śląska, Siemianowice Śląskie, Świętochłowice and Tychy.

== Elections ==
=== 2015 ===
2015 parliamentary election: Katowice
Party	Votes	%	Seats
Law and Justice	135,367	32.92	5
Civic Platform	116,658	28.37	5
Kukiz'15	41,344	10.05	1
Modern	35,591	8.66	1
United Left	27,837	6.77	–
KORWiN	22,803	5.55	–
Together	16,786	4.08	–
United for Silesia	10,740	2.61	–
Polish People's Party	4,064	0.99	–
Total	411,190	100.00	12
Valid votes	411,190	98.05	
Invalid/blank votes	8,187	1.95	
Total votes	419,377	100.00	
Registered voters/turnout	777,770	53.92	
Source: National Electoral Commission

=== 2019 ===
2019 parliamentary election: Katowice
Party	Votes	%	Seats
Law and Justice	184,030	39.19	5
Civic Coalition	174,683	37.20	5
The Left	55,992	11.92	1
Confederation	34,416	7.33	1
Polish People's Party	20,512	4.37	–
Total	469,633	100.00	12
Valid votes	469,633	99.05	
Invalid/blank votes	4,490	0.95	
Total votes	474,123	100.00	
Registered voters/turnout	740,858	64.00	
Source: National Electoral Commission

=== 2023 ===
2023 parliamentary election: Katowice
Party	Votes	%	Seats
Civic Coalition	193,596	36.79	5
Law and Justice	162,458	30.88	4
Third Way	69,825	13.27	1
The Left	44,509	8.46	1
Confederation	35,240	6.70	1
There is One Poland	11,051	2.10	–
Nonpartisan Local Government Activists	9,488	1.80	–
Total	526,167	100.00	12
Valid votes	526,167	98.74	
Invalid/blank votes	6,716	1.26	
Total votes	532,883	100.00	
Registered voters/turnout	702,884	75.81	
Source: National Electoral Commission

== List of deputies ==
Deputies of the 10th Sejm (2023–2027)
Deputy	Party	Portfolio
Mateusz Morawiecki	Law and Justice	Prime Minister
Marek Wesoły	Law and Justice	Secretary of State in the Ministry of State Assets
Michał Wójcik	Law and Justice	Minister, Member of the Council of Ministers
Jerzy Polaczek	Law and Justice	
Borys Budka	Civic Platform (Note: Member of the Civic Coalition parliamentary group.)	
Ewa Kołodziej	Civic Platform	
Wojciech Król	Civic Platform	
Łukasz Ściebiorowski	Civic Platform	
Monika Rosa	Modern	
Michał Gramatyka	Poland 2050	
Maciej Konieczny	Left Together (Note: Member of The Left parliamentary group)	
Grzegorz Płaczek	Confederation	
