= Zawiślak =

Zawiślak (feminine Zawiślakowa or Zawiślakówna) is a Polish surname. It is a topographic surname referring to someone who lived "over the Vistula". It may refer to:

- Andrzej Zawiślak (1937–2015), Polish politician
- Sławomir Zawiślak (born 1963), Polish politician
- Dariusz Zawiślak (born 1972), artist

It is often anglicized to Zawislak or Zavislak.
