= Maciej Lasek =

Polish engineer

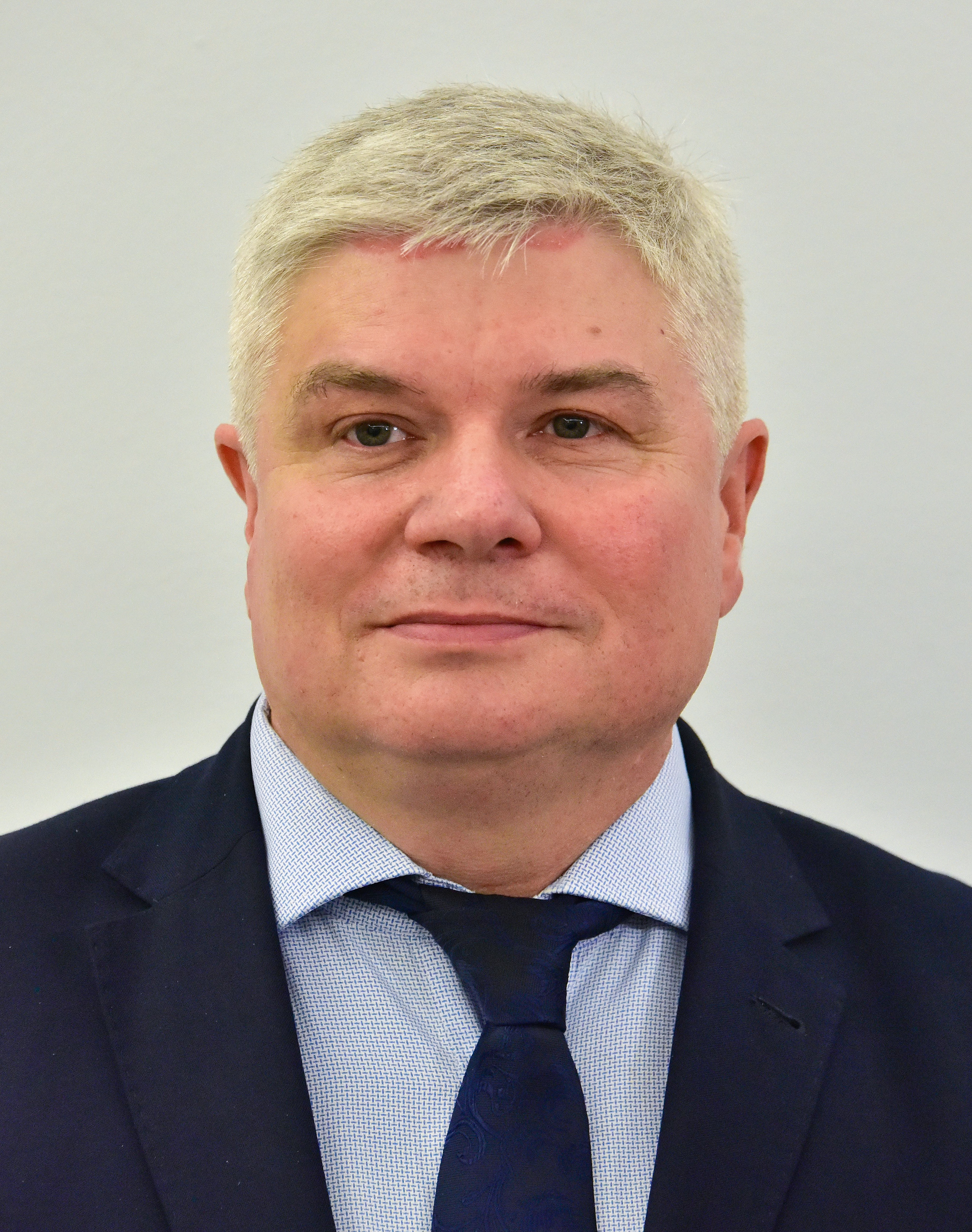

Member of the Sejm
- Incumbent
- Assumed office 12 November 2019
- Constituency: No. 20 (Warsaw)

Deputy Ministry of Infrastructure
- Incumbent
- Assumed office July 2024

Personal details
- Born: 15 June 1967 (age 59) Elbląg
- Occupation: Civil servant, aviation safety
- Known for: Smolensk air crash investigation

Maciej Grzegorz Lasek (born. 15 June 1967 in Elbląg) is a Polish engineer, specializing in flight mechanics, PhD, Chairman of the Committee for Investigation of National Aviation Accidents. He was the head of a commission that investigated the 2010 Polish Air Force Tu-154 crash.

== Argument with Antoni Macierewicz ==
In April 2020, former defense minister Antoni Macierewicz posted a tweet accusing Lasek of falsifying evidence related to the Smolensk disaster, and in a July 2020 Sejm defense committee meeting alleged that Lasek hid evidence of explosions on the aircraft. Lasek sued Macierewicz alleging Macierewicz's statements were defamatory, seeking a public apology a payment to a charity, and cessation of statements on the topic. Lasek won the suit in September 2025.
