= Krzysztof Ciecióra =

Polish politician (born 1989)

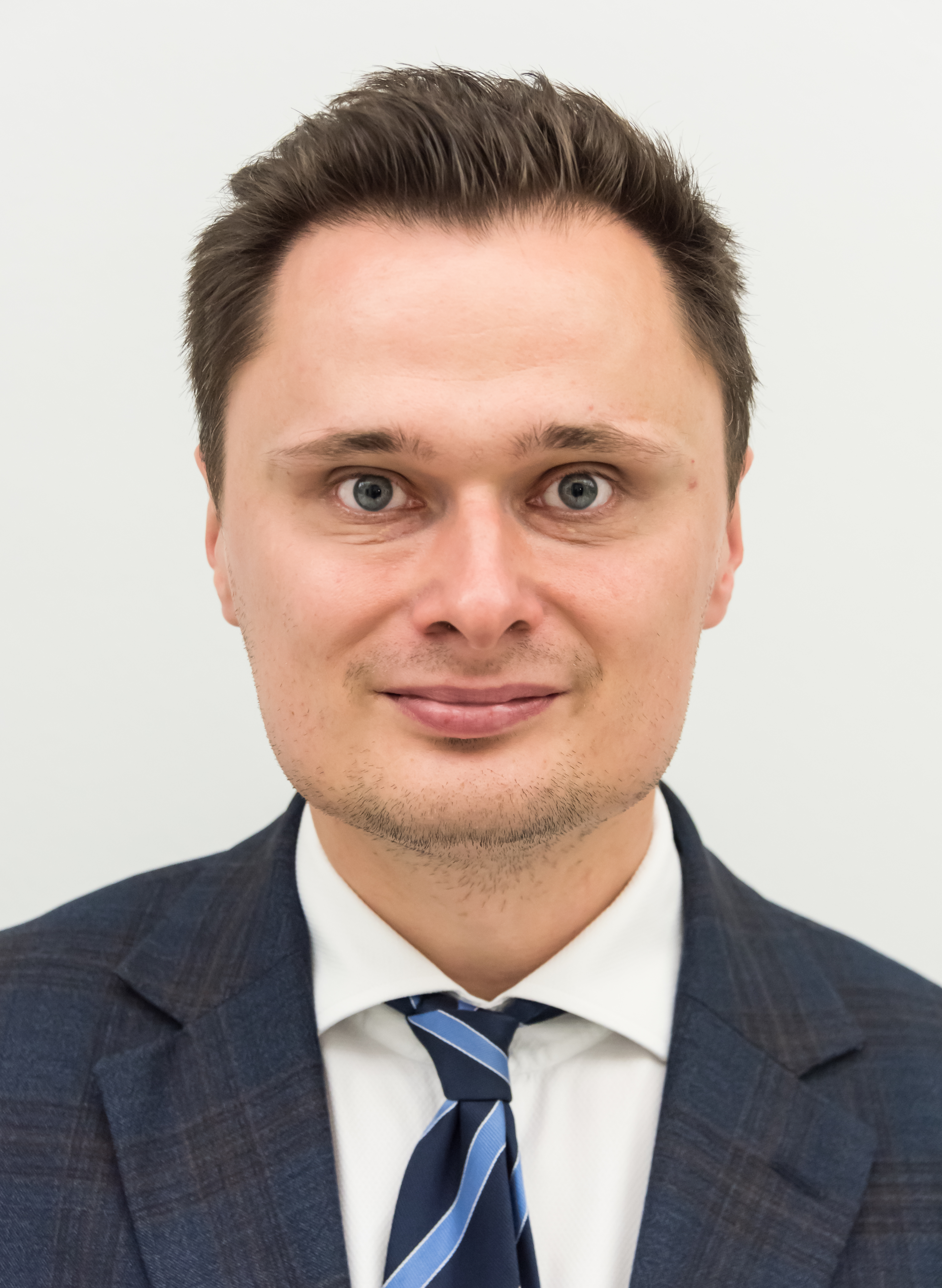
- Ciecióra in 2023

Member of the Sejm
- Incumbent
- Assumed office 13 November 2023
- Constituency: Piotrków Trybunalski

Personal details
- Born: 27 June 1989 (age 36)
- Party: Law and Justice
- Parent: Jacek Ciecióra (father)

Krzysztof Ciecióra (born 27 June 1989) is a Polish politician serving as a member of the Sejm since 2023. From 2019 to 2021, he served as deputy voivode of Łódź. From 2021 to 2023, he served as deputy ministry of agriculture and rural development.
