= Małgorzata Gromadzka =

Polish politician (born 1985)

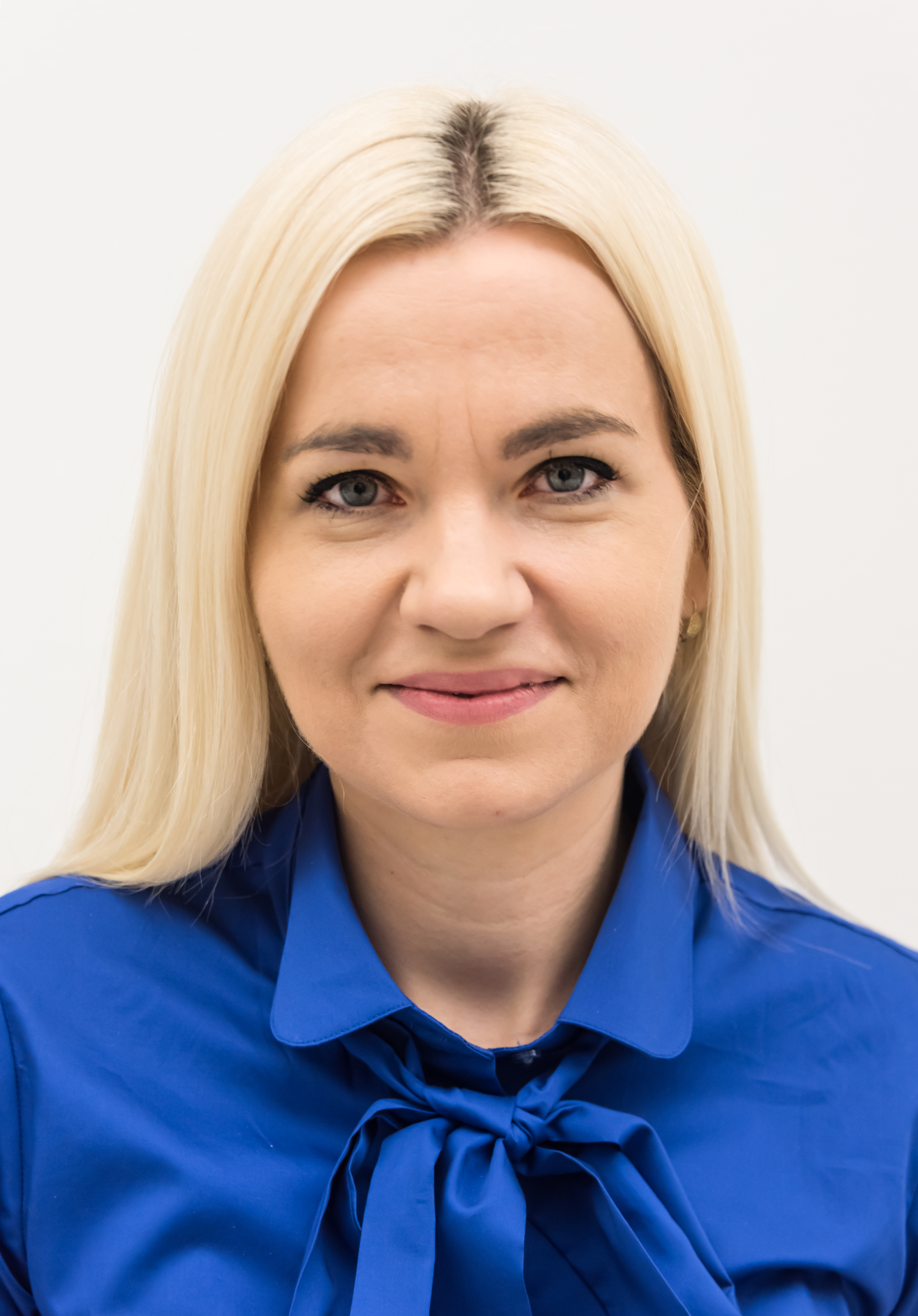
- Gromadzka in 2023

Member of the Sejm
- Incumbent
- Assumed office 13 November 2023
- Constituency: Chełm

Personal details
- Born: 24 March 1985 (age 41)
- Party: Civic Coalition (since 2025)
- Other political affiliations: Civic Platform (2010–2025)

Małgorzata Gromadzka (born 24 March 1985) is a Polish politician serving as a member of the Sejm since 2023. She has served as deputy minister of agriculture and rural development since 2025.
