= Monika Rosa =

Polish politician (born 1986)

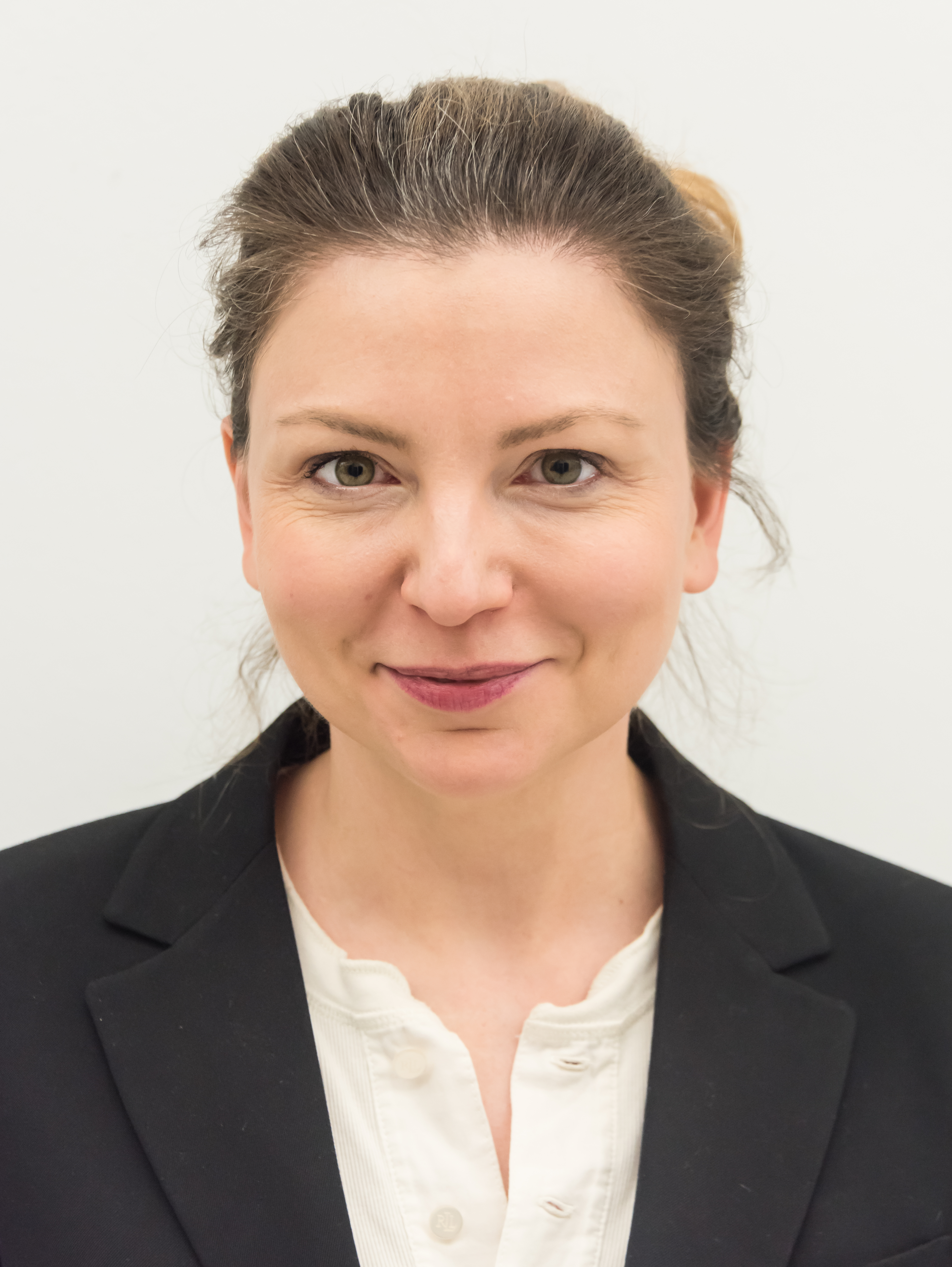

Member of the Sejm
- Incumbent
- Assumed office 12 November 2015

Personal details
- Born: 24 April 1986 (age 39)
- Party: Modern

Monika Rosa (born 24 April 1986) is a Polish politician. She was elected to the Sejm (9th term) representing the constituency of Katowice II. She previously also served in the 8th term of the Sejm (2015–2019).

In the 2023 elections, she was re-elected as a member of the Sejm, receiving 44,857 votes.
