= Witold Tumanowicz =

Polish politician (born 1986)

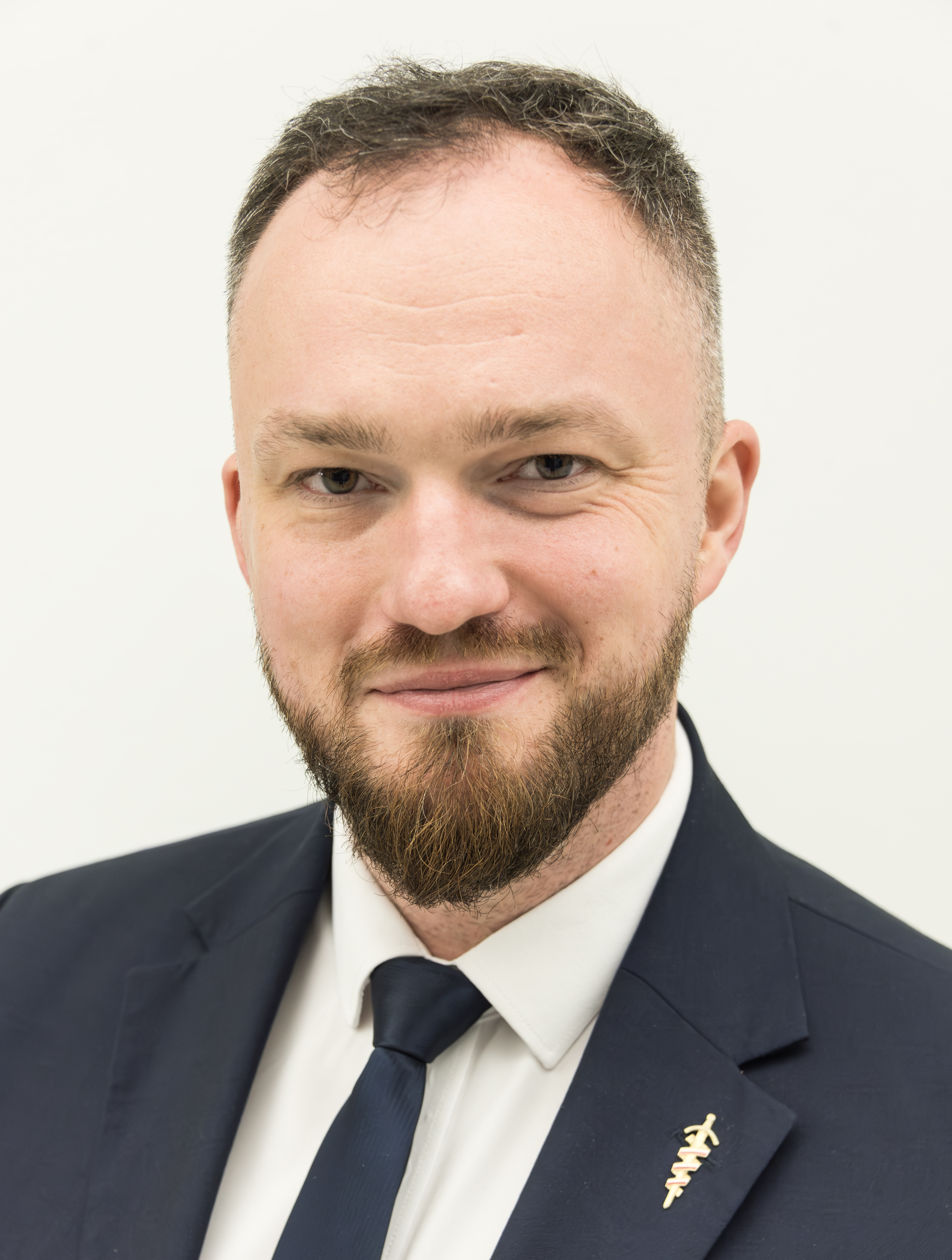
- Tumanowicz in 2023

Member of the Sejm
- Incumbent
- Assumed office 13 November 2023
- Constituency: Chełm

Personal details
- Born: 4 November 1986 (age 39)
- Party: National Movement
- Other political affiliations: Confederation Liberty and Independence

Witold Tumanowicz (born 4 November 1986) is a Polish politician serving as a member of the Sejm since 2023. He served as vice president of the All-Polish Youth from 2011 to 2013, and as president of the Independence March Association from 2011 to 2015.

In 2025, he made international headlines for becoming the first politician to react and complain about the delay in the release of Grand Theft Auto VI.
