= Sejm Constituency no. 7 =

Parliamentary constituency in Poland

The constituency of Chełm lies in the Lublin Voivodeship, in the east of Poland.

Chełm is a Polish parliamentary constituency in the Lublin Voivodeship. It elects twelve members of the Sejm.

The district has the number '7' and is named after the city of Chełm. It includes the counties of Biała, Biłgoraj, Chełm, Hrubieszów, Krasnystaw, Parczew, Radzyń, Tomaszów, Włodawa, and Zamość, and the city counties of Biała Podlaska, Chełm, and Zamość.

== List of deputies ==
Deputies for the 10th Sejm (2023–2027)
Deputy	Party	Parliamentary group
Sławomir Ćwik	Poland 2050	Poland 2050
Monika Pawłowska	Independent politician	None
Dariusz Stefaniuk	Law and Justice	Law and Justice
Sławomir Zawiślak	Law and Justice	Law and Justice
Tomasz Zieliński	Law and Justice	Law and Justice
Marcin Romanowski	Sovereign Poland	Law and Justice
Anna Dąbrowska-Banaszek	OdNowa RP	Law and Justice
Krzysztof Grabczuk	Civic Platform	Civic Coalition
Małgorzata Gromadzka	Civic Platform	Civic Coalition
Wiesław Różyński	Polish People's Party	Polish People's Party
Jarosław Sachajko	Kukiz'15	Kukiz'15
Witold Tumanowicz	National Movement	Confederation
