= Sejm Constituency no. 10 =

Constituency of the Parliament of Poland

Piotrków Trybunalski
- Constituency for the Sejm
- Location of Piotrków Trybunalski within Poland
- Counties: Bełchatów County; Opoczno County; Piotrków County; Piotrków Trybunalski; Radomsko County; Rawa County; Skierniewice County; Skierniewice; Tomaszów County
- Voivodeship: Łódź
- Population: 683,373 (2023)
- Electorate: 540,069 (2023)
- Area: 7,405 km^{2} (2022)

Current Constituency
- Created: 2001
- Seats: 9
- Deputies: List: Krzysztof Ciecióra (Ind. PiS); Dariusz Klimczak (PSL); Grzegorz Lorek (PiS); Antoni Macierewicz (PiS); Anna Milczanowska (PiS); Paweł Sałek (PiS); Robert Telus (PiS); Adrian Witczak (PO); Bogusław Wołoszański (Ind. KO)

Piotrków Trybunalski, officially known as Constituency no. 10 (Polish: Okręg wyborczy nr 10), is one of the 41 constituencies of the Sejm, the lower house of the Parliament of Poland, the national legislature of Poland. The constituency was established in 2001, after a major redistricting process across Poland. It is located in the Łódź Voivodeship and includes the area of two city counties: Piotrków Trybunalski and Skierniewice, as well as the counties of Bełchatów, Opoczno, Piotrków, Radomsko, Rawa Mazowiecka, Skierniewice and Tomaszów Mazowiecki.

The constituency currently elects 9 of the 460 members of the Sejm using the open party-list proportional representation electoral system. At the 2023 parliamentary election it had 540,069 citizens eligible to vote.

== History ==
The electoral district was created in 2001, due to redistricting process. It was a merger of two constituencies: Sejm Constituency no. 33 (no. 5 until 1993), which covered the area of the then-Piotrków Voivodeship, and the parts of Sejm Constituency no. 41 (created in 1993), which covered the area of the then-Skierniewice Voivodeship. This constituency is considered as one of the Law and Justice's safest districts, as they won every election there since 2005. Since 2015, PiS has maintained the majority of seats in this district.

== Election results ==
=== 2001 ===
2001 parliamentary election: Piotrków Trybunalski
Party	Votes	%	Seats
Democratic Left Alliance – Labour Union	96,957	39.70	4
Self-Defence of the Republic of Poland	38,832	15.90	2
Polish People's Party	36,400	14.91	1
Civic Platform	20,342	8.33	1
League of Polish Families	18,283	7.49	1
Law and Justice	15,429	6.32	–
Solidarity of the Right Electoral Action	11,722	4.80	–
Freedom Union	3,980	1.63	–
Polish Socialist Party	1,041	0.43	–
Social Alternative Movement	951	0.39	–
Polish National Community	268	0.11	–
Total	244,205	100.00	9
Valid votes	244,205	95.24	
Invalid/blank votes	12,217	4.76	
Total votes	256,422	100.00	
Registered voters/turnout	574,449	44.64	
Source: National Electoral Commission

=== 2005 ===
2005 parliamentary election: Piotrków Trybunalski
Party	Votes	%	Seats
Law and Justice	51,840	23.26	3
Self-Defence of the Republic of Poland	48,034	21.56	2
Civic Platform	34,159	15.33	1
Democratic Left Alliance	24,967	11.20	1
Polish People's Party	24,065	10.80	1
League of Polish Families	20,185	9.06	1
Social Democracy of Poland	6,290	2.82	–
Democratic Party – demokraci.pl	3,920	1.76	–
Janusz Korwin-Mikke's Platform	3,240	1.45	–
Polish Labour Party	1,942	0.87	–
Centre	1,113	0.50	–
All-Polish Civic Coalition	839	0.38	–
Polish National Party	738	0.33	–
Initiative of the Republic of Poland	705	0.32	–
Polish Confederation - Dignity and Work	418	0.19	–
National Revival of Poland	380	0.17	–
Total	222,835	100.00	9
Valid votes	222,835	96.33	
Invalid/blank votes	8,482	3.67	
Total votes	231,317	100.00	
Registered voters/turnout	588,411	39.31	
Source: National Electoral Commission

=== 2007 ===
2007 parliamentary election: Piotrków Trybunalski
Party	Votes	%	Seats
Law and Justice	120,944	41.42	4
Civic Platform	81,532	27.92	3
Polish People's Party	39,889	13.66	1
Left and Democrats	36,055	12.35	1
Self-Defence of the Republic of Poland	6,631	2.27	–
League of Polish Families	3,685	1.26	–
Polish Labour Party	3,246	1.11	–
Total	291,982	100.00	9
Valid votes	291,982	97.66	
Invalid/blank votes	6,995	2.34	
Total votes	298,977	100.00	
Registered voters/turnout	590,183	50.66	
Source: National Electoral Commission

=== 2011 ===
2011 parliamentary election: Piotrków Trybunalski
Party	Votes	%	Seats
Law and Justice	103,472	39.62	4
Civic Platform	66,889	25.61	2
Polish People's Party	34,789	13.32	1
Democratic Left Alliance	23,988	9.19	1
Palikot's Movement	23,010	8.81	1
Poland Comes First	4,956	1.90	–
Right Wing	2,230	0.85	–
Polish Labour Party - August 80	1,801	0.69	–
Total	261,135	100.00	9
Valid votes	261,135	94.19	
Invalid/blank votes	16,097	5.81	
Total votes	277,232	100.00	
Registered voters/turnout	592,584	46.78	
Source: National Electoral Commission

=== 2015 ===
2015 parliamentary election: Piotrków Trybunalski
Party	Votes	%	Seats
Law and Justice	134,134	46.95	6
Civic Platform	44,173	15.46	2
Kukiz'15	28,808	10.08	1
Polish People's Party	21,364	7.48	–
United Left	21,352	7.47	–
Modern	15,983	5.59	–
KORWiN	11,160	3.91	–
Together	8,747	3.06	–
Total	285,721	100.00	9
Valid votes	285,721	97.01	
Invalid/blank votes	8,808	2.99	
Total votes	294,529	100.00	
Registered voters/turnout	586,015	50.26	
Source: National Electoral Commission

=== 2019 ===
2019 parliamentary election: Piotrków Trybunalski
Party	Votes	%	Seats
Law and Justice	194,658	56.21	6
Civic Coalition	54,160	15.64	1
The Left	37,930	10.95	1
Polish People's Party	36,151	10.44	1
Confederation Liberty and Independence	23,427	6.76	–
Total	346,326	100.00	9
Valid votes	346,326	98.72	
Invalid/blank votes	4,506	1.28	
Total votes	350,832	100.00	
Registered voters/turnout	567,583	61.81	
Source: National Electoral Commission

=== 2023 ===
2023 parliamentary election: Piotrków Trybunalski
Party	Votes	%	Seats
Law and Justice	184,929	46.60	6
Civic Coalition	86,083	21.69	2
Third Way	54,479	13.73	1
Confederation Liberty and Independence	30,247	7.62	–
The Left	25,340	6.39	–
Nonpartisan Local Government Activists	8,597	2.17	–
There is One Poland	5,457	1.38	–
Prosperity and Peace Movement	1,687	0.43	–
Total	396,819	100.00	9
Valid votes	396,819	97.92	
Invalid/blank votes	8,427	2.08	
Total votes	405,246	100.00	
Registered voters/turnout	540,069	75.04	
Source: National Electoral Commission
