= Monika Pawłowska =

Polish politician (born 1983)

Monika Jolanta Pawłowska
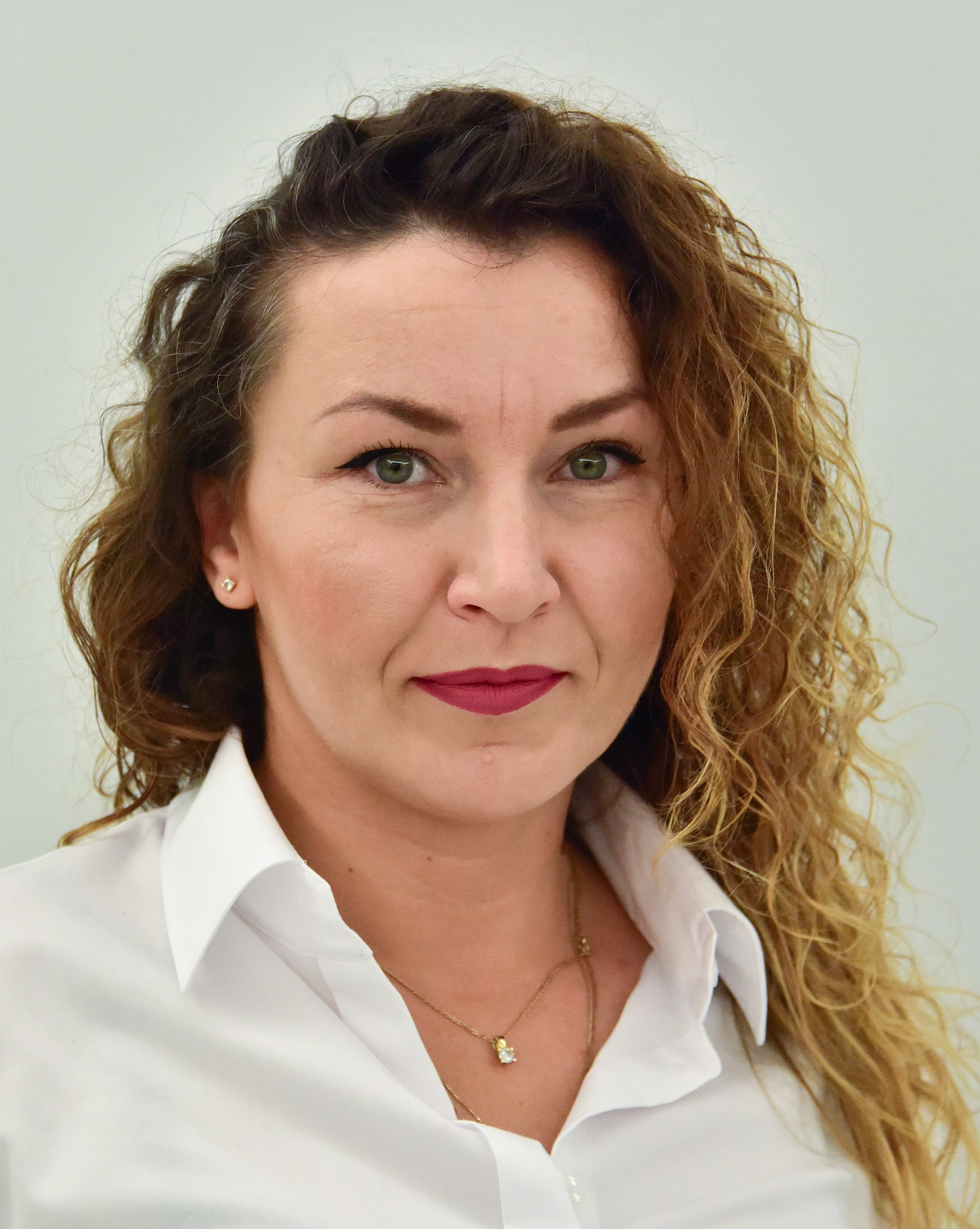

Member of the Sejm
- Incumbent
- Assumed office 6 March 2024
- Constituency: 7 - Chełm
- In office 12 November 2019 – 12 November 2023
- Constituency: 7 - Chełm

Personal details
- Born: 15 June 1983 (age 43) Ryki, Lublin Voivodeship, Poland
- Party: Rozwój Plus (since 2026)
- Other political affiliations: SLD (until 2019); Spring (2019–2021); Agreement (2021); PiS (2021–2026)
- Children: 1
- Education: University of Warsaw

Monika Jolanta Pawłowska (de domo Kominek, primo voto Kominek-Sahakyan, born 15 June 1983) is a Polish politician.

== Life and education ==
A graduate of the Faculty of Political Science and International Studies at the University of Warsaw. Professionally she worked in managerial positions, she also ran her own business. She also worked as an assistant to Stanisława Prządka, member of the Sejm. She became the vice-president of the Forum of Equal Opportunities and Women's Rights in the Lublin Voivodeship, she also initiated the establishment of the Women's Council under the President of Puławy.

== Political career ==
She was associated with the Democratic Left Alliance (Polish: Sojusz Lewicy Demokratycznej). In 2019, she became involved in political activity as part of the Spring (Polish: Wiosna) party, she became its coordinator in the Lublin Voivodeship. Her actions are connected with accusations of bullying on the part of the activist Przedwiośnie (the peer court of Spring found her vocabulary incorrect, issued a reprimand, but did not find any signs of mobbing).

In 2019, she unsuccessfully ran for the European Parliament in the Lublin constituency, receiving 4,426 votes. In the parliamentary elections in the same year, she was elected a deputy to the Sejm of the Republic of Poland of the 9th term in the Chełm constituency. She was a candidate from the Democratic Left Alliance list (under the agreement of the left-wing parties), winning 12,916 votes.

In the Sejm, she became a member of the National Defense Committee (Polish: Komisja Obrony Narodowej) and the Administration and Internal Affairs Committee (Polish: Komisja Administracji i Spraw Wewnętrznych), as well as the vice-chairman of two permanent subcommittees (for social affairs in the army and for the Polish defense industry and technical modernization of the Polish Armed Forces). In November 2019, she was elected deputy chairman of the parliamentary club of The Left (Polish: Lewica). In March 2021, she left this club and Spring, joining the Agreement (Polish: Porozumienie) and becoming a non-attached MP.

On September 30, 2021, Pawłowska left the Agreement party. The next day she joined the Law and Justice. In the 2023 Polish parliamentary election, she failed to win the Sejm reelection. In February 2024, she took her seat in place of Mariusz Kamiński. On March 6, 2024, she took the oath of office, returning to the Sejm.
