= Bożena Żelazowska =

Polish politician (born 1970)

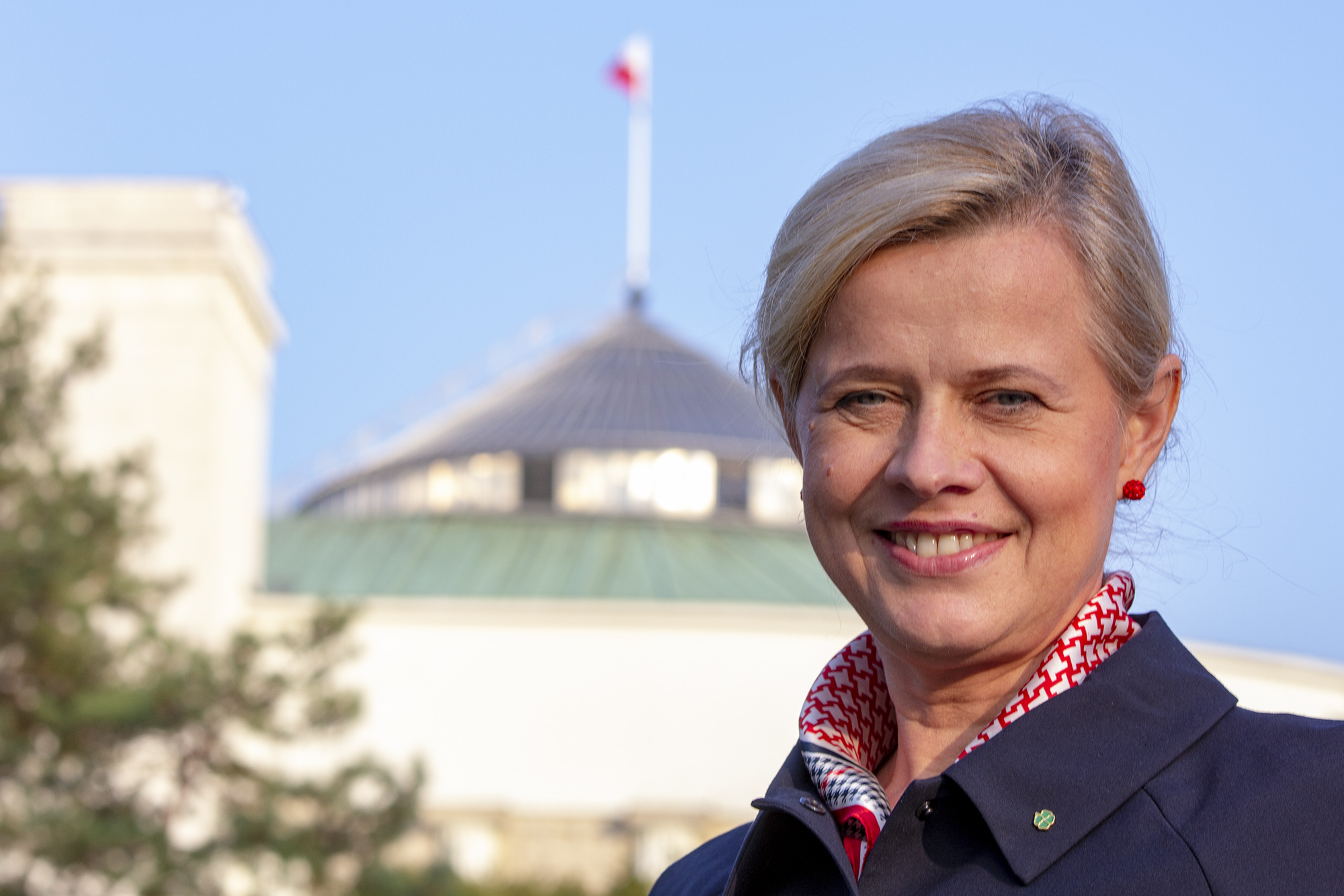
- Żelazowska in 2019

Member of the Sejm
- Incumbent
- Assumed office 12 November 2019
- Constituency: Warsaw II

Personal details
- Born: 23 August 1970 (age 56) Chełm, Polish People's Republic
- Party: Polish People's Party
- Other political affiliations: Third Way
- Education: Maria Curie-Skłodowska University

Bożena Żelazowska (born 23 August 1970) is a Polish politician of the Polish People's Party. She has been a member of the Sejm since 2019, and has served as secretary of state of the Ministry of Culture and National Heritage since 2023. She was a member of the Masovian Voivodeship Sejmik from 2014 to 2019, and was the lead candidate of the Third Way in Masovia in the 2024 European Parliament election.

== Biography ==
Żelazowska was born on 23 August 1970, in Chełm. She attended the Maria Curie-Skłodowska University in Lublin where she graduated in political science. She later also attended postrgraduate studies in culture management at the SGH Warsaw School of Economics .

In December 2023 following the formation of the Third Cabinet of Donald Tusk she was appointed secretary of state in the Ministry of Culture and National Heritage and General Inspector of Monuments.

== Awards and honours ==
Country	Decoration	Date of issue
Poland	Bronze Cross of Merit	6 December 2004
