= Krzysztof Grabczuk =

Polish politician (born 1962)

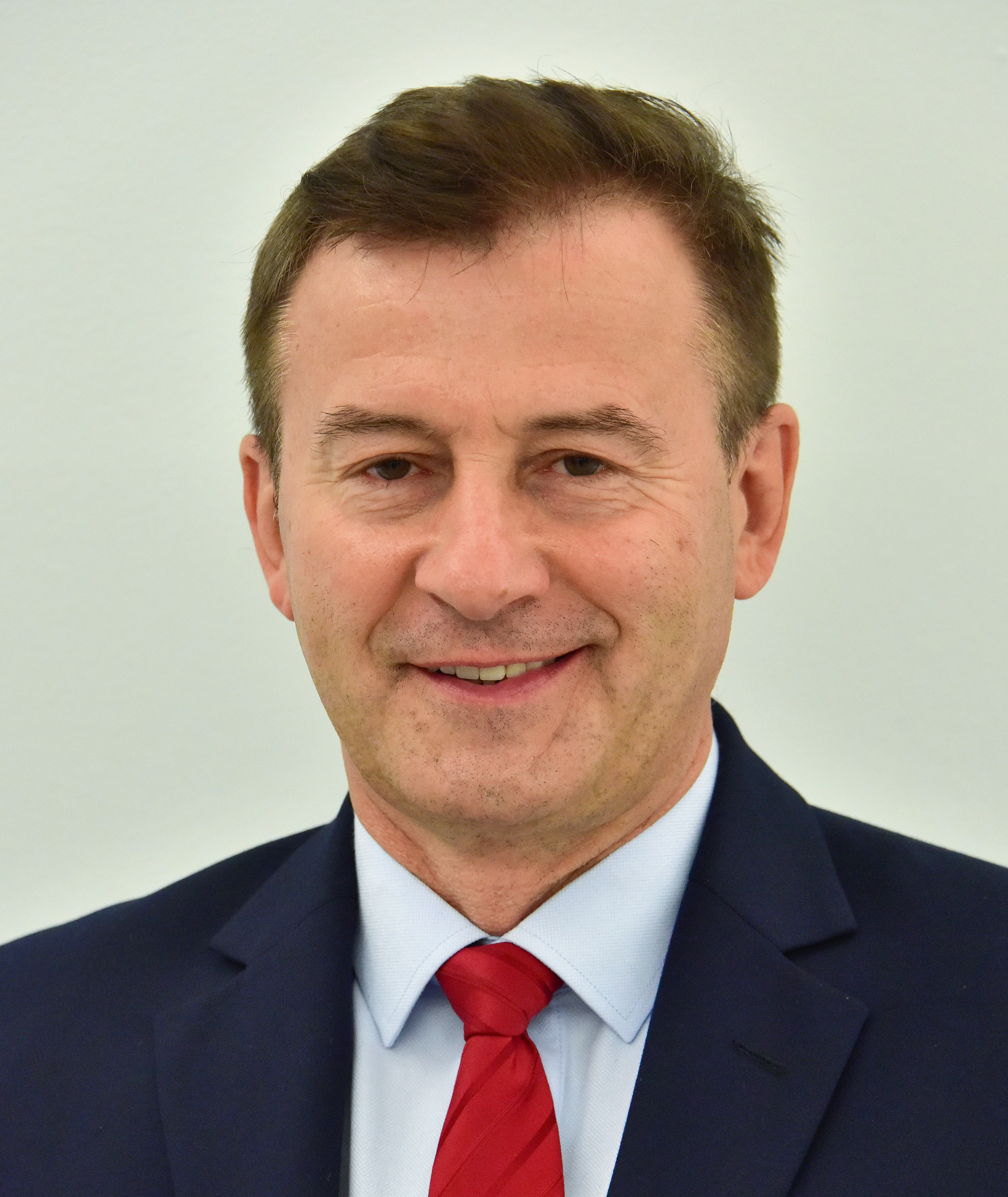
- Grabczuk in 2019

Member of the Sejm
- Incumbent
- Assumed office 12 November 2019
- Constituency: Chełm

Personal details
- Born: 22 April 1962 (age 63)
- Party: Civic Platform

Krzysztof Grabczuk (born 22 April 1962) is a Polish politician serving as a member of the Sejm since 2019. From 2008 to 2010, he served as marshal of Lublin Voivodeship. From 2002 to 2006, he served as mayor of Chełm.
