= Paweł Sałek =

Polish politician (born 1975)

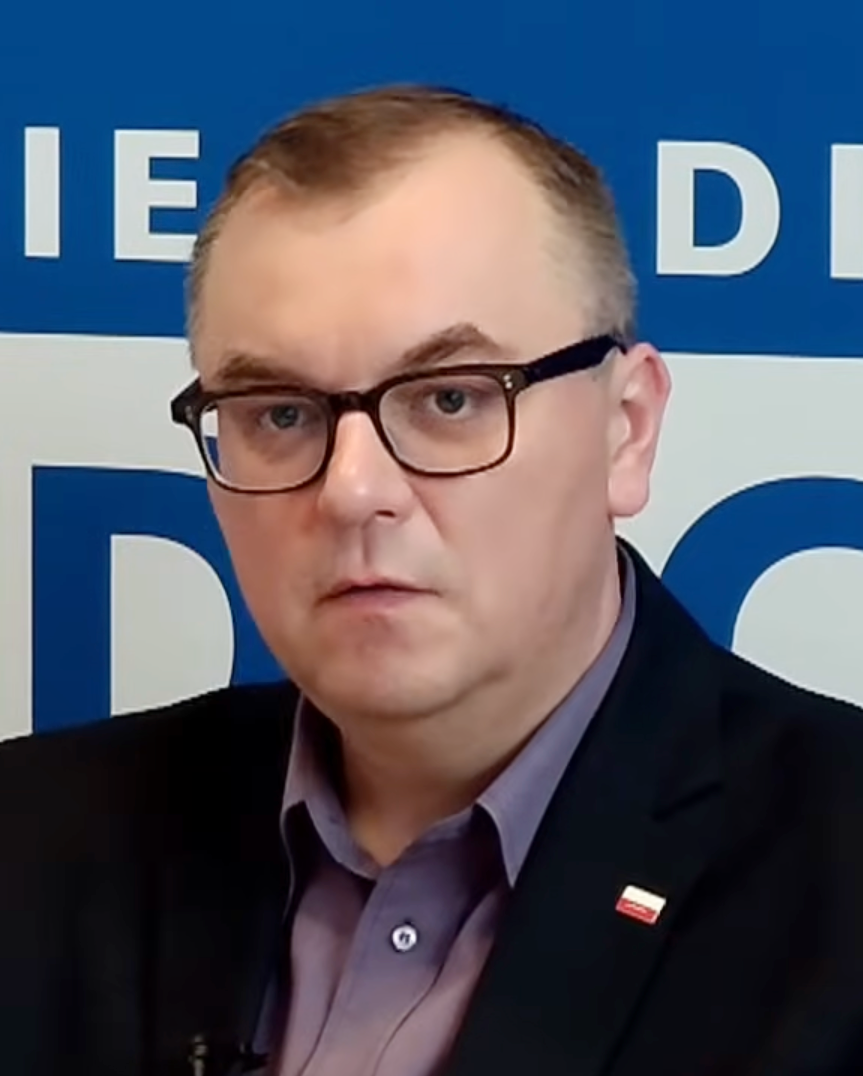
- Paweł Sałek

Member of the Sejm
- Incumbent
- Assumed office 13 November 2023
- Constituency: Piotrków Trybunalski

Personal details
- Born: 29 June 1975 (age 50)
- Party: Law and Justice

Paweł Sałek (born 29 June 1975) is a Polish politician serving as a member of the Sejm since 2023. From 2018 to 2023, he served as advisor to president Andrzej Duda.
