= Marek Wesoły (politician) =

Polish politician

Marek Jacek Wesoły
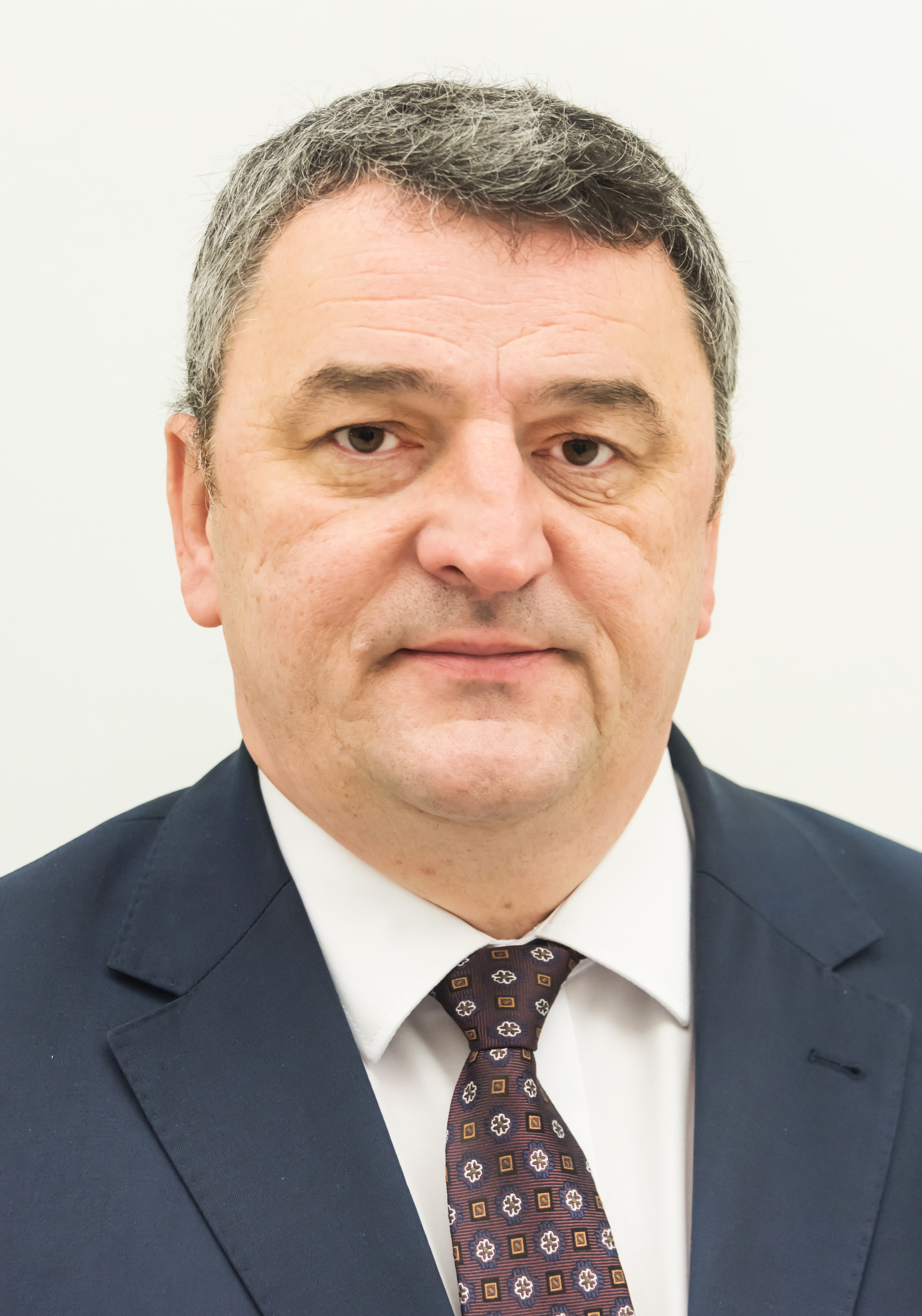
- Marek Wesoły in 2022
- Born: 3 May 1972 (age 54); Ruda Śląska, Poland
- Education: University of Silesia
- Occupations: Politician, local government official, entrepreneur
- Office: Member of the Sejm, IX, X terms (since 2019); Deputy Minister of State Assets (2023)
- Political party: Law and Justice (since 2014)
- Website: Official website

Marek Jacek Wesoły (born 3 May 1972) is a Polish politician, local government official and entrepreneur. He is serving as a member of the Sejm in the IX and X terms, and as Deputy Minister of State Assets in 2023.

== Early life and education ==
Wesoły was born on 3 May 1972 in Ruda Śląska. He attended a vocational high school, where he graduated as an electro-mechanical technician. In 2003, he obtained a bachelor's degree in catechetical-theological studies from the University of Silesia.

== Career ==
Wesoły worked as a manager of a retail chain before starting his own business ventures, including the operation of a restaurant. In 2016, he became the president of Jelux, a company in the retail sector.

In the realm of politics, Wesoły ran for the city council of Ruda Śląska in 2002 and 2006 as part of the local committee "Prawo Rodzina Obywatel" (Law Family Citizen). He later joined the Law and Justice party, winning seats as a councilor in 2010, 2014, and 2018. In 2019, he was elected as a member of the Sejm of the Republic of Poland in the Katowice district.

In September 2020, Wesoły was suspended by the chairman of Law and Justice, Jarosław Kaczyński, for violating party discipline by voting against an amendment to the animal protection law. The suspension was lifted in November 2020. In 2022, he ran for the position of Mayor of Ruda Śląska in a special election following the death of Grażyna Dziedzic, supported by Jarosław Kaczyński. He finished third in the election.

On 1 March 2023, Wesoły was appointed Deputy Minister of State Assets and government plenipotentiary for the transformation of energy and coal mining companies. He successfully ran for re-election to the Sejm in the parliamentary elections later that year. In December 2023, he concluded his tenure as Deputy Minister. In the 2024 local elections, he made his fourth unsuccessful bid for the position of Mayor of Ruda Śląska.
