= Bronisław Foltyn =

Polish politician

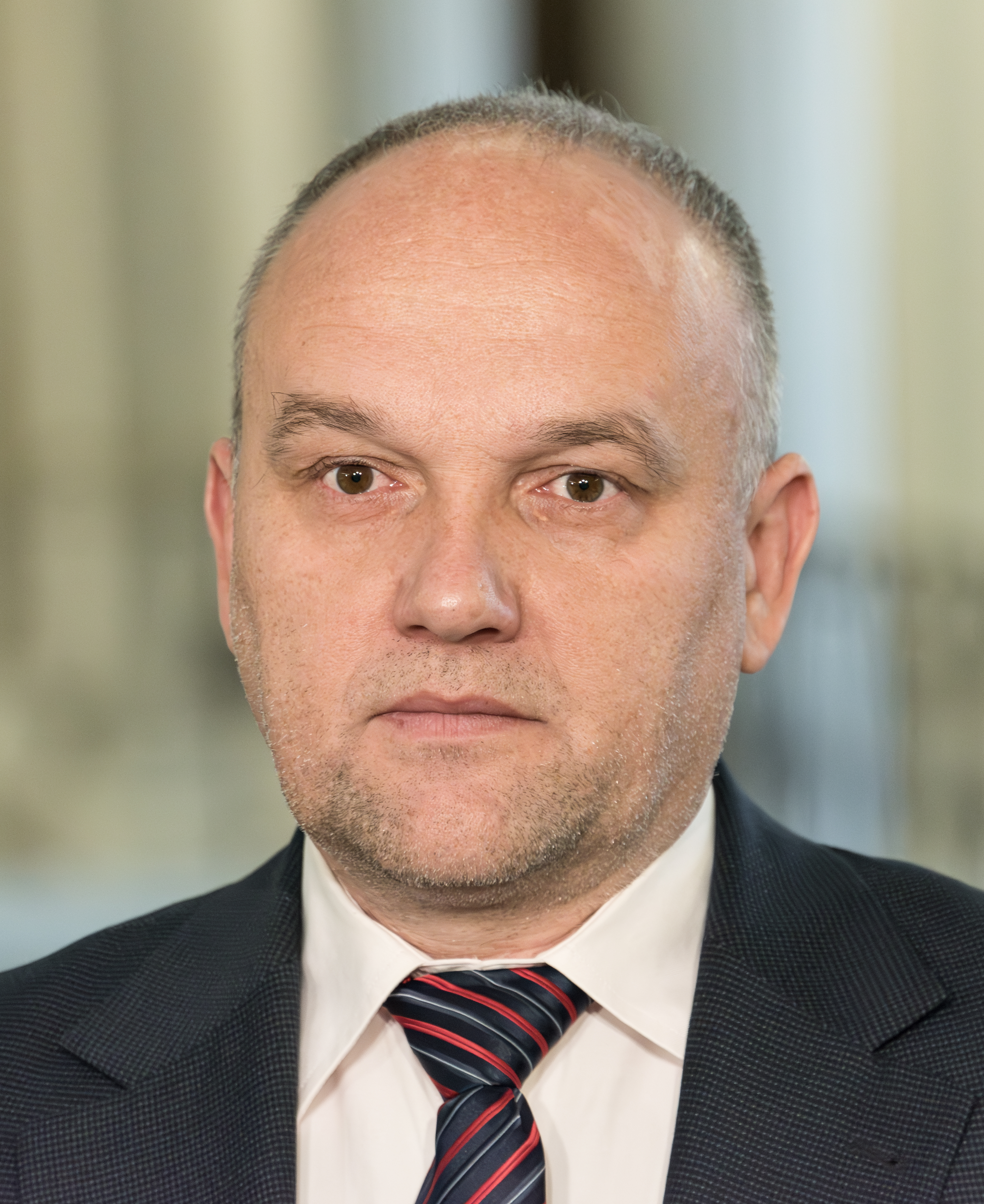
- Bronisław Foltyn in 2023

Member of the Sejm
- Incumbent
- Assumed office 13 November 2023
- Constituency: No. 27 (Bielsko-Biała)

Personal details
- Born: 12 August 1974 (age 52) Krynica, Poland
- Party: New Hope
- Education: University College of Tourism and Ecology in Sucha Beskidzka

Bronisław Foltyn (born 12 August 1974) is a Polish politician who serves as a member of the 10th term Sejm.

== Early life and education ==
Foltyn was born in Bielsko-Biała as the son of Bronisława and Antoni. He was educated as a baker and confectioner. In 2021, he obtained a licentiate in political science from the University College of Tourism and Ecology in Sucha Beskidzka. An entrepreneur by profession, since 2000 Foltyn ran a chain of mobile phone stores. He is also involved in the gastronomic industry and is a co-owner of several restaurants in Bielsko-Biała.

== Political career ==
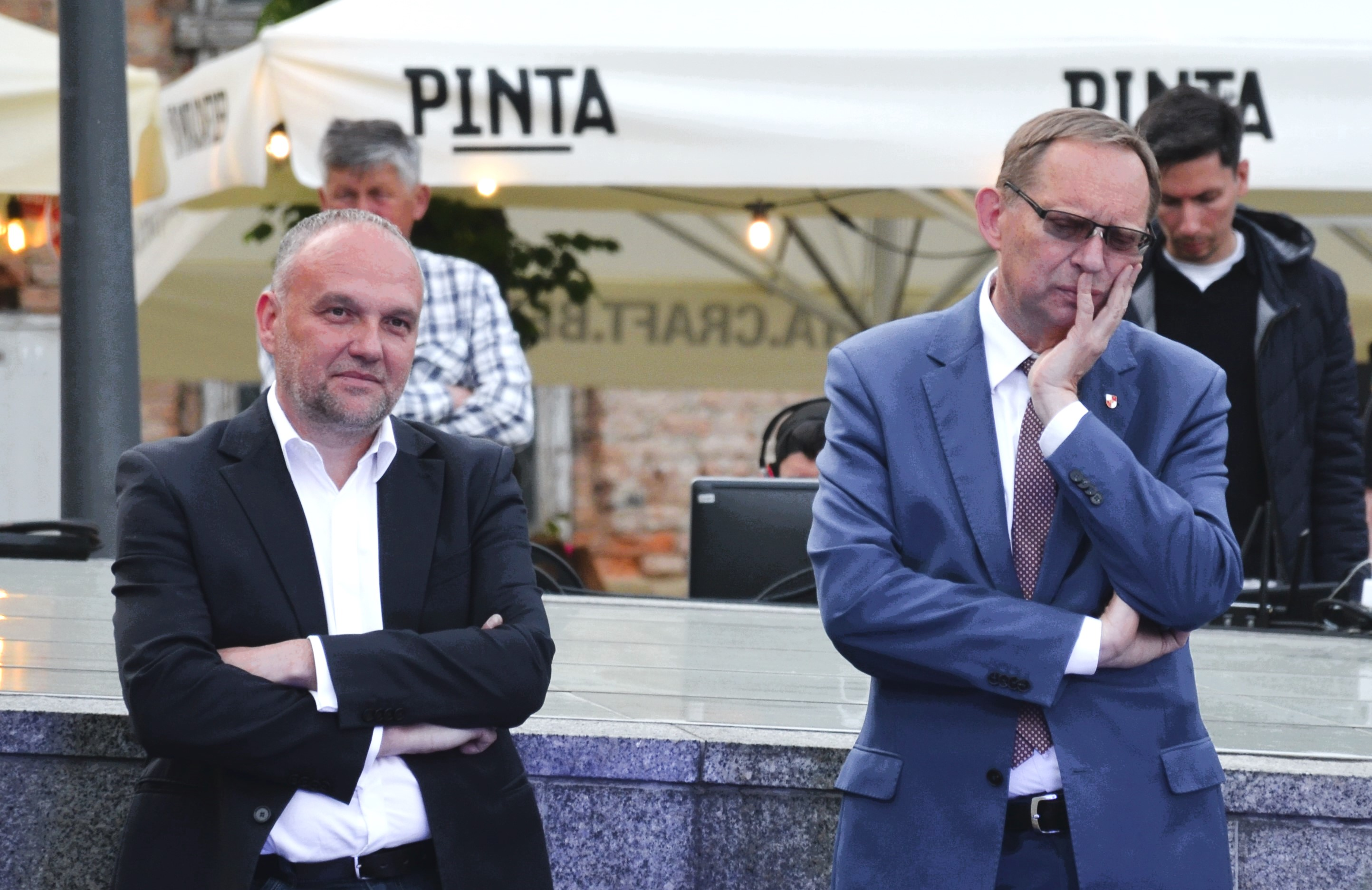
MPs Bronisław Foltyn and Roman Fritz in Bielsko-Biała

Foltyn was active in the KoLiber association. He led the structures of the Real Politics Union in Bielsko-Biała. In the parliamentary elections in 2023, he was elected to the Sejm from constituency no. 27, winning 18,134 votes. In 2024 Foltyn was a candidate for the office of mayor of Bielsko-Biała (he lost in the first round).
