= Electoral districts of Poland =

Electoral districts of Poland (Polish: okręgi wyborcze, okręg wyborczy (sg.)) are defined by Polish election law. Electoral districts can be divided depending on whether they are individual entities or parts of a larger electoral district with regard to elections to 1) parliament (Sejm) and Senate 2) local offices and 3) European Parliament. Each district has a number of mandates calculated on the basis of its population.

== List of Sejm constituencies ==
Sejm constituency distribution map

Tilegram (cartogram) of the Sejm electoral districts

No.	Name	# of deputies	Voivodeship
1	Legnica	12	Lower Silesian
2	Wałbrzych	8	Lower Silesian
3	Wrocław	14	Lower Silesian
4	Bydgoszcz	12	Kuyavian-Pomeranian
5	Toruń	13	Kuyavian-Pomeranian
6	Lublin	15	Lublin
7	Chełm	12	Lublin
8	Zielona Góra	12	Lubusz
9	Łódź	10	Łódź
10	Piotrków Trybunalski	9	Łódź
11	Sieradz	12	Łódź
12	Kraków I	8	Lesser Poland
13	Kraków II	14	Lesser Poland
14	Nowy Sącz	10	Lesser Poland
15	Tarnów	9	Lesser Poland
16	Płock	10	Masovian
17	Radom	9	Masovian
18	Siedlce	12	Masovian
19	Warsaw I	20	Masovian
20	Warsaw II	12	Masovian
21	Opole	12	Opole
22	Krosno	11	Podkarpackie
23	Rzeszów	15	Podkarpackie
24	Białystok	14	Podlaskie
25	Gdańsk	12	Pomeranian
26	Słupsk	14	Pomeranian
27	Bielsko-Biała I	9	Silesian
28	Częstochowa	7	Silesian
29	Katowice I	9	Silesian
30	Bielsko-Biała II	9	Silesian
31	Katowice II	12	Silesian
32	Katowice III	9	Silesian
33	Kielce	16	Świętokrzyskie
34	Elbląg	8	Warmian-Masurian
35	Olsztyn	10	Warmian-Masurian
36	Kalisz	12	Greater Poland
37	Konin	9	Greater Poland
38	Piła	9	Greater Poland
39	Poznań	10	Greater Poland
40	Koszalin	8	West Pomeranian
41	Szczecin	12	West Pomeranian

Source: "Polish Parliamentary Elections 2019". wybory.gov.pl. National Electoral Commission (Poland). 23 October 2019.

== List of Senate constituencies ==
Senate constituency distribution map

No.	Corresponding Sejm constituency	Voivodeship
1	1 — Legnica	Lower Silesian
2	1 — Legnica	Lower Silesian
3	1 — Legnica	Lower Silesian
4	2 — Wałbrzych	Lower Silesian
5	2 — Wałbrzych	Lower Silesian
6	3 — Wrocław	Lower Silesian
7	3 — Wrocław	Lower Silesian
8	3 — Wrocław	Lower Silesian
9	4 — Bydgoszcz	Kuyavian-Pomeranian
10	4 — Bydgoszcz	Kuyavian-Pomeranian
11	5 — Toruń	Kuyavian-Pomeranian
12	5 — Toruń	Kuyavian-Pomeranian
13	5 — Toruń	Kuyavian-Pomeranian
14	6 — Lublin	Lublin
15	6 — Lublin	Lublin
16	6 — Lublin	Lublin
17	7 — Chełm	Lublin
18	7 — Chełm	Lublin
19	7 — Chełm	Lublin
20	8 — Zielona Góra	Lubusz
21	8 — Zielona Góra	Lubusz
22	8 — Zielona Góra	Lubusz
23	9 — Łódź	Łódź
24	9 — Łódź	Łódź
25	11 — Sieradz	Łódź
26	11 — Sieradz	Łódź
27	11 — Sieradz	Łódź
28	10 — Piotrków Trybunalski	Łódź
29	10 — Piotrków Trybunalski	Łódź
30	12 — Kraków I	Lesser Poland
31	13 — Kraków II	Lesser Poland
32	13 — Kraków II	Lesser Poland
33	13 — Kraków II	Lesser Poland
34	15 — Tarnów	Lesser Poland
35	15 — Tarnów	Lesser Poland
36	14 — Nowy Sącz	Lesser Poland
37	14 — Nowy Sącz	Lesser Poland
38	16 — Płock	Masovian
39	16 — Płock	Masovian
40	20 — Warsaw II	Masovian
41	20 — Warsaw II	Masovian
42	19 — Warsaw I	Masovian
43	19 — Warsaw I	Masovian
44	19 — Warsaw I	Masovian
45	19 — Warsaw I	Masovian
46	18 — Siedlce	Masovian
47	18 — Siedlce	Masovian
48	18 — Siedlce	Masovian
49	17 — Radom	Masovian
50	17 — Radom	Masovian
51	21 — Opole	Opole
52	21 — Opole	Opole
53	21 — Opole	Opole
54	23 — Rzeszów	Podkarpackie
55	23 — Rzeszów	Podkarpackie
56	23 — Rzeszów	Podkarpackie
57	22 — Krosno	Podkarpackie
58	22 — Krosno	Podkarpackie
59	24 — Białystok	Podlaskie
60	24 — Białystok	Podlaskie
61	24 — Białystok	Podlaskie
62	26 — Słupsk	Pomeranian
63	26 — Słupsk	Pomeranian
64	26 — Słupsk	Pomeranian
65	25 — Gdańsk	Pomeranian
66	25 — Gdańsk	Pomeranian
67	25 — Gdańsk	Pomeranian
68	28 — Częstochowa	Silesian
69	28 — Częstochowa	Silesian
70	29 — Katowice I	Silesian
71	29 — Katowice I	Silesian
72	30 — Bielsko-Biała II	Silesian
73	30 — Bielsko-Biała II	Silesian
74	31 — Katowice II	Silesian
75	31 — Katowice II	Silesian
76	32 — Katowice III	Silesian
77	32 — Katowice III	Silesian
78	27 — Bielsko-Biała I	Silesian
79	27 — Bielsko-Biała I	Silesian
80	31 — Katowice II	Silesian
81	33 — Kielce	Świętokrzyskie
82	33 — Kielce	Świętokrzyskie
83	33 — Kielce	Świętokrzyskie
84	34 — Elbląg	Warmian-Masurian
85	34 — Elbląg	Warmian-Masurian
86	35 — Olsztyn	Warmian-Masurian
87	35 — Olsztyn	Warmian-Masurian
88	38 — Piła	Greater Poland
89	38 — Piła	Greater Poland
90	39 — Poznań	Greater Poland
91	39 — Poznań	Greater Poland
92	37 — Konin	Greater Poland
93	37 — Konin	Greater Poland
94	36 — Kalisz	Greater Poland
95	36 — Kalisz	Greater Poland
96	36 — Kalisz	Greater Poland
97	41 — Szczecin	West Pomeranian
98	41 — Szczecin	West Pomeranian
99	40 — Koszalin	West Pomeranian
100	40 — Koszalin	West Pomeranian

Source: "Polish Parliamentary Elections 2019". wybory.gov.pl. National Electoral Commission (Poland). 23 October 2019.

== List of European Parliament constituencies ==
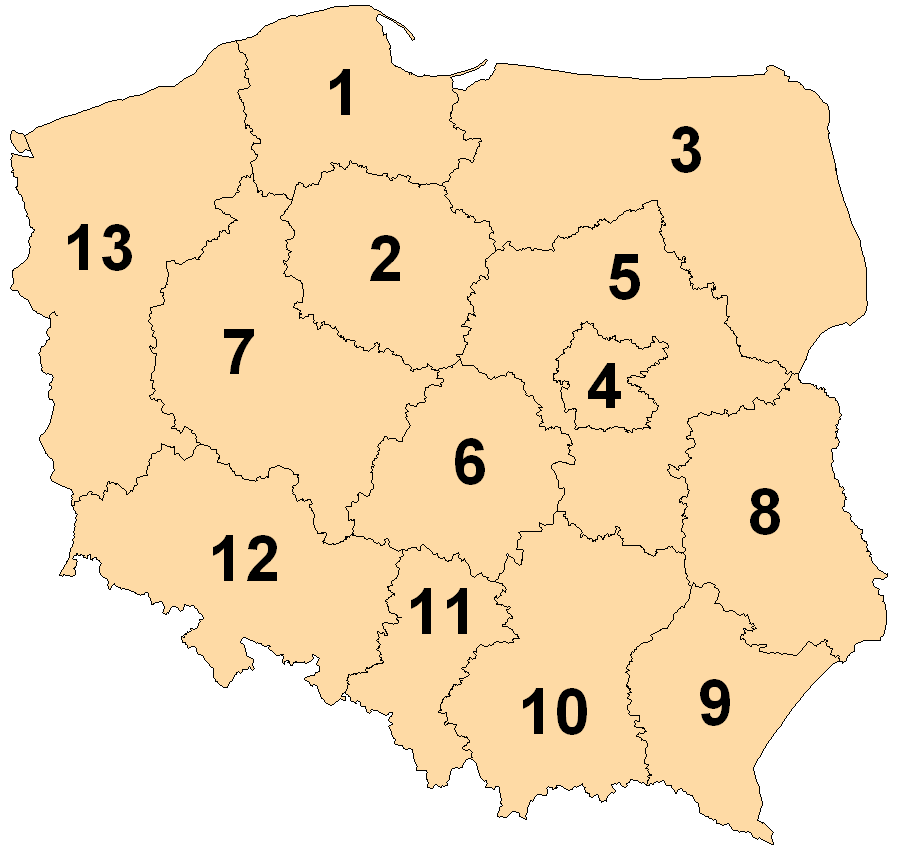
European Parliament constituency distribution map

No.	Name	Corresponding Sejm constituencies	# of MEPs	Voivodeship
1	Gdańsk	25 — Gdańsk	3	Pomeranian
1	Gdańsk	26 — Słupsk	3	Pomeranian
2	Bydgoszcz	4 — Bydgoszcz	2	Kuyavian-Pomeranian
2	Bydgoszcz	5 — Toruń	2	Kuyavian-Pomeranian
3	Podlaskie	24 — Białystok	3	Podlaskie
3	Podlaskie	34 — Elbląg	3	Warmian-Masurian
3	Podlaskie	35 — Olsztyn	3	Warmian-Masurian
4	Warsaw I	19 — Warsaw I	6	Masovian
4	Warsaw I	20 — Warsaw II	6	Masovian
5	Warsaw II	16 — Płock	3	Masovian
5	Warsaw II	17 — Radom	3	Masovian
5	Warsaw II	18 — Siedlce	3	Masovian
6	Łódź	9 — Łódź	3	Łódź
6	Łódź	10 — Piotrków Trybunalski	3	Łódź
6	Łódź	11 — Sieradz	3	Łódź
7	Poznań	36 — Kalisz	5	Greater Poland
7	Poznań	37 — Konin	5	Greater Poland
7	Poznań	38 — Piła	5	Greater Poland
7	Poznań	39 — Poznań	5	Greater Poland
8	Lublin	6 — Lublin	3	Lublin
8	Lublin	7 — Chełm	3	Lublin
9	Rzeszów	22 — Krosno	3	Podkarpackie
9	Rzeszów	23 — Rzeszów	3	Podkarpackie
10	Kraków	12 — Kraków I	5	Lesser Poland
10	Kraków	13 — Kraków II	5	Lesser Poland
10	Kraków	14 — Nowy Sącz	5	Lesser Poland
10	Kraków	15 — Tarnów	5	Lesser Poland
10	Kraków	33 — Kielce	5	Świętokrzyskie
11	Katowice	27 — Bielsko-Biała I	7	Silesian
11	Katowice	28 — Częstochowa	7	Silesian
11	Katowice	29 — Katowice I	7	Silesian
11	Katowice	30 — Bielsko-Biała II	7	Silesian
11	Katowice	31 — Katowice II	7	Silesian
11	Katowice	32 — Katowice III	7	Silesian
12	Wrocław	1 — Legnica	4	Lower Silesian
12	Wrocław	2 — Wałbrzych	4	Lower Silesian
12	Wrocław	3 — Wrocław	4	Lower Silesian
12	Wrocław	21 — Opole	4	Opole
13	Gorzów Wielkopolski	8 — Zielona Góra	4	Lubusz
13	Gorzów Wielkopolski	40 — Koszalin	4	West Pomeranian
13	Gorzów Wielkopolski	41 — Szczecin	4	West Pomeranian

Source: "European Parliamentary Elections 2019". pe2019.pkw.gov.pl. National Electoral Commission (Poland). 5 June 2019.

The numbers of elected MEPs in districts may change every election, because to European Parliament are elected 51 persons (52 after brexit) with the highest score in the country.

== See also ==
- Administrative division of Poland
- Elections in Poland
- Electoral districts of Poland (1935–1939)
