= Sławomir Zawiślak =

Polish politician

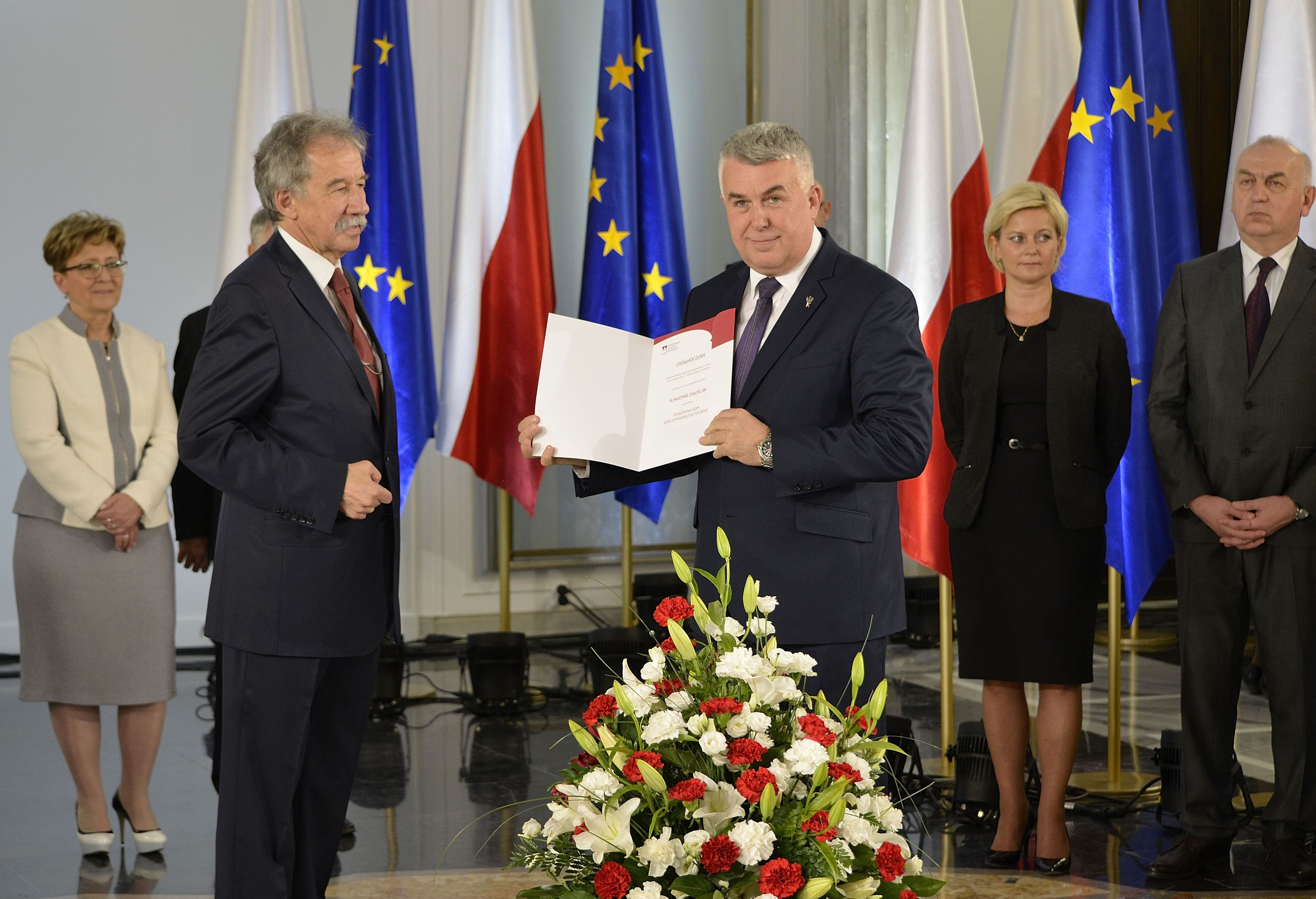
- Sławomir Zawiślak (Right)

Member of Sejm
- Incumbent
- Assumed office 25 September 2005

Personal details
- Born: 9 June 1963 (age 62) Krasnobród, Poland
- Party: KKP (since 2025)
- Other political affiliations: ZChN (formerly); PiS (2002–2025)

Sławomir Zawiślak (born 9 June 1963) is a Polish politician.

Zawiślak was born in Krasnobród. He was elected to the Sejm on 25 September 2005, getting 5,860 votes in 7 Chełm district as a candidate from the Law and Justice list. He was elected again on 21 October 2007, getting 16,064 votes.

== Early life and education ==
Zawiślak graduated in history from the John Paul II Catholic University of Lublin (earning a Master's degree in 2004) and completed Executive MBA studies at the University of Management in Warsaw in 2016. Between 1991 and 1998, he operated his own transport company. He also worked in municipal and regional administration, serving as director of a swimming pool in Zamość.

== Career ==
He was a member of the Christian-National Union before joining the Law and Justice party in 2002, where he became the party's chairman for the Chełm region. In 2002, he ran for the county council of Zamość.

In the 2005 Polish parliamentary election, he was elected to the Sejm (5th term) from the PiS list in the Chełm constituency. In the 2007 Polish parliamentary election, he was reelected with 16,064 votes. In 2009, he unsuccessfully ran for the European Parliament. In 2010, he contested the mayoral election in Zamość, losing in the first round to Marcin Zamoyski. In the 2011 Polish parliamentary election, he was reelected to the Sejm, receiving 24,478 votes. He unsuccessfully ran for the European Parliament again in 2014, but in the 2015 Polish parliamentary election, he secured reelection to the Sejm with 25,236 votes. In the 2019 European Parliament election in Poland, he unsuccessfully ran for a seat in the European Parliament from the Lublin Voivodeship constituency.

In the 2019 Polish parliamentary election, he retained his Sejm seat with 24,346 votes. In September 2020, Jarosław Kaczyński, the leader of PiS, suspended him from party membership for breaking party discipline by not voting on an amendment to the Animal Protection Act. That same month, he was removed from his role as a regional representative for the party in Zamość. His suspension ended in November 2020. In the 2023 Polish parliamentary election, he was reelected to the Sejm with 10,936 votes. In 2024, he once again unsuccessfully ran for the mayorship of Zamość, this time representing his own electoral committee.

== See also ==
- Members of Polish Sejm 2005-2007
- Members of Polish Sejm 2007-2011
