= List of constituencies for the Senate of the Republic of Poland =

Senate constituencies since 2011

The list of constituencies for the Senate of the Republic of Poland provides an overview of the distribution and numbering of the constituencies (Polish: Okręgi wyborcze) for the election to the Senate of the Republic of Poland since 2011. The current constituency division arose from the change from multi-person constituencies to single-person constituencies and dissolved the constituencies existing used from 2001 to 2011. The most recent constituencies were contested for the first time in the parliamentary elections on 9 October 2011.

== Legal basis ==
The legal basis for Senate constituencies are Articles 260 and 261 of the Election Code (Kodeks wyborczy).

The constituencies for the Senate of the Republic of Poland, the number of which is fixed at 100, should fully encompass Sejm electoral districts and not violate powiats and voivodeship borders. Cities of more than 500 thousand inhabitants can be divided into two or more constituencies. The shape of a constituency is based on the number of residents living in it: ideally, this should be around one hundredth of the total population, but variation between 0.5 and 2.0 multiple of the reference one hundredth is allowed. For the 2011 Polish parliamentary election, the National Electoral Commission (Państwowa Komisja Wyborcza) announced the reference number to be 377,483. Therefore the lower limit for a constituency was 188,742 inhabitants and the upper limit 754,966. The exact layout of the constituencies can be found in Appendix No. 2 (Załącznik nr 2) of the Election Code.

Votes cast abroad (in embassies and consulates) and on Polish ships count towards the 44th constituency per article 14 section 3 of the Election Code which states that all non-domestically cast votes should be included in the count for the Downtown (Śródmieście) district of Warsaw.

== List of constituencies ==
The following table is based on Appendix No. 2 of the Codex wyborczy in the last announcement of 22 February 2019 (Dz.U. 2019 poz. 684) and the publication of the population figures of the individual constituencies of October 9, 2011 by the Panstwowa Komisja Wyborcza.

Number	Voivodeship	HQ of constituency	Counties	Population
1	Lower Silesian	Legnica	Bolesławiecki, Lubański, Lwówecki, Zgorzelecki	285.847
2	Lower Silesian	Legnica	Jelenia Góra, Jaworski, Jeleniogórski, Kamiennogórski, Złotoryjski	288.256
3	Lower Silesian	Legnica	Legnica, Głogowski, Legnicki, Lubiński, Polkowicki	409.501
4	Lower Silesian	Wałbrzych	Wałbrzych, Swidnicki, Wałbrzyski	333.569
5	Lower Silesian	Wałbrzych	Dzierżoniowski, Kłodzki, Ząbkowicki	337.717
6	Lower Silesian	Wrocław	Górowski, Milicki, Oleśnicki, Oławski, Strzeliński, Średzki, Trzebnicki, Wołowski, Wrocławski	588.002
7	Lower Silesian	Wrocław	South Wrocław	274.610
8	Lower Silesian	Wrocław	North Wrocław	318.198
9	Kuyavian-Pomeranian	Bydgoszcz	Bydgoszcz, Bydgoski, Świecki, Tucholski	593.516
10	Kuyavian-Pomeranian	Bydgoszcz	Inowrocławski, Mogileński, Nakielski, Sępoleński, Żniński	407.977
11	Kuyavian-Pomeranian	Toruń	Toruń, Powiat Chełmiński, Toruński	339.801
12	Kuyavian-Pomeranian	Toruń	Grudziądz, Brodnicki, Golubsko-Dobrzyński, Grudziądzki, Rypiński, Wąbrzeski	337.752
13	Kuyavian-Pomeranian	Toruń	Włocławek, Aleksandrowski, Lipnowski, Radziejowski, Włocławski	367.018
14	Lublin	Lublin	Lubartowski, Łukowski, Opolski, Puławski, Rycki	442.339
15	Lublin	Lublin	Janowski, Kraśnicki, Lubelski, Łęczyński, Świdnicki	424.020
16	Lublin	Lublin	Lublin	331.690
17	Lublin	Chełm	Biała Podlaska, Bialski, Parczewski, Radzyński	273.092
18	Lublin	Chełm	Chełm, Chełmski, Krasnostawski, Włodawski	255.978
19	Lublin	Chełm	Zamość, Biłgorajski, Hrubieszowski, Tomaszowski, Zamojski	442.429
20	Lubusz	Zielona Góra	Zielona Góra, Krośnieński, Świebodziński, Zielonogórski	316.079
21	Lubusz	Zielona Góra	Gorzów Wielkopolski; Gorzowski, Międzyrzecki, Strzelecko-Drezdenecki, Słubicki, Sulęciński	378.931
22	Lubusz	Zielona Góra	Nowosolski, Wschowski, Żagański, Żarski	306.504
23	Łódź	Łódź	Eastern part of Łódź	402.711
24	Łódź	Łódź	Western part of Łódź, Brzeziński, Łódzki wschodni	392.471
25	Łódź	Sieradz	Kutnowski, Łęczycki, Łowicki, Poddębicki	278.134
26	Łódź	Sieradz	Łaski, Pabianicki, Zgierski	328.454
27	Łódź	Sieradz	Pajęczański, Sieradzki, Wieluński, Wieruszowski, Zduńskowolski	363.735
28	Łódź	Piotrków Trybunalski	Piotrków Trybunalski, Bełchatowski, Piotrkowski, Radomszczański	398.250
29	Łódź	Piotrków Trybunalski	Skierniewice, Opoczyński, Rawski, Skierniewicki, Tomaszowski	336.677
30	Lesser Poland	Kraków I	Chrzanowski, Myślenicki, Oświęcimski, Suski, Wadowicki	643.133
31	Lesser Poland	Kraków II	Krakowski, Miechowski, Olkuski	418.318
32	Lesser Poland	Kraków II	North Kraków	345.765
33	Lesser Poland	Kraków II	South Kraków	357.846
34	Lesser Poland	Tarnów	Bocheński, Brzeski, Proszowicki, Wielicki	350.967
35	Lesser Poland	Tarnów	Tarnów, Dąbrowski, Tarnowski	370.090
36	Lesser Poland	Nowy Sącz	Limanowski, Nowotarski, Tatrzański	382.388
37	Lesser Poland	Nowy Sącz	Nowy Sącz, Gorlicki, Nowosądecki	403.761
38	Masovian	Płock	Płock, Gostyniński, Płocki, Sierpecki, Sochaczewski, Żyrardowski	490.770
39	Masovian	Płock	Ciechanowski, Mławski, Płoński, Przasnyski, Żuromiński	350.193
40	Masovian	Warsaw II	Legionowski, Nowodworski, Warszawski Zachodni, Wołomiński	493.860
41	Masovian	Warsaw II	Grodziski, Otwocki, Piaseczyński, Pruszkowski	502.344
42	Masovian	Warsaw I	Eastern Warsaw	399.248
43	Masovian	Warsaw I	Southern Warsaw	432.003
44	Masovian	Warsaw I	Northern and Central Warsaw	374.302
45	Masovian	Warsaw I	Western Warsaw	402.338
46	Masovian	Siedlce	Ostrołęka, Makowski, Ostrołęcki, Ostrowski, Pułtuski, Wyszkowski	390.023
47	Masovian	Siedlce	Garwoliński, Miński, Węgrowski	322.420
48	Masovian	Siedlce	Siedlce, Łosicki, Siedlecki, Sokołowski	247.781
49	Masovian	Radom	Białobrzeski, Grójecki, Kozienicki, Przysuski	239.477
50	Masovian	Radom	Radom, Lipski, Radomski, Szydłowiecki, Zwoleński	483.235
51	Opole	Opole	Brzeski, Kluczborski, Namysłowski, Nyski, Prudnicki	400.590
52	Opole	Opole	Opole, Opolski	246.125
53	Opole	Opole	Głubczycki, Kędzierzyńsko-Kozielski, Krapkowicki, Oleski, Strzelecki	350.476
54	Subcarpathian	Rzeszów	Tarnobrzeg, Leżajski, Niżański, Stalowowolski, Tarnobrzeski	351.001
55	Subcarpathian	Rzeszów	Dębicki, Kolbuszowski, Mielecki, Ropczycko-Sędziszowski, Strzyżowski	471.406
56	Subcarpathian	Rzeszów	Rzeszów, Łańcucki, Rzeszowski	412.745
57	Subcarpathian	Krosno	Krosno, Brzozowski, Jasielski, Krośnieński	344.286
58	Subcarpathian	Krosno	Przemyśl, Bieszczadzki, Jarosławski, Leski, Lubaczowski, Przemyski, Przeworski, Sanocki	547.683
59	Podlaskie	Białystok	Łomża, Suwałki, Augustowski, Grajewski, Kolneński, Łomżyński, Moniecki, Sejneński, Suwalski, Zambrowski	479.465
60	Podlaskie	Białystok	Białystok, Białostocki, Sokólski	491.733
61	Podlaskie	Białystok	Bielski, Hajnowski, Siemiatycki, Wysokomazowiecki	216.436
62	Pomeranian	Gdynia	Słupsk, Lęborski, Słupski, Wejherowski	447.729
63	Pomeranian	Gdynia	Bytowski, Chojnicki, Człuchowski, Kartuski, Kościerski	417.915
64	Pomeranian	Gdynia	Gdynia, Pucki	315.778
65	Pomeranian	Gdańsk	Gdańsk, Sopot	469.369
66	Pomeranian	Gdańsk	Gdański, Starogardzki, Tczewski	332.114
67	Pomeranian	Gdańsk	Kwidzyński, Malborski, Nowodworski, Sztumski	224.411
68	Silesian	Częstochowa	Częstochowski, Kłobucki, Lubliniecki, Myszkowski	368.945
69	Silesian	Częstochowa	Częstochowa	229.609
70	Silesian	Gliwice	Gliwice, Gliwicki, Tarnogórski	427.230
71	Silesian	Gliwice	Bytom, Zabrze	338.479
72	Silesian	Rybnik	Jastrzębie-Zdrój, Żory, Raciborski, Wodzisławski	412.925
73	Silesian	Rybnik	Rybnik, Mikołowski, Rybnicki	304.071
74	Silesian	Katowice	Chorzów, Piekary Śląskie, Ruda Śląska, Siemianowice Śląskie, Świętochłowice	423.977
75	Silesian	Katowice	Mysłowice, Tychy, Bieruńsko-Lędziński	256.017
76	Silesian	Sosnowiec	Dąbrowa Górnicza; Będziński, Zawierciański	393.454
77	Silesian	Sosnowiec	Jaworzno, Sosnowiec	303.789
78	Silesian	Bielsko-Biała	Bielsko-Biała, Bielski, Pszczyński	431.697
79	Silesian	Bielsko-Biała	Cieszyński, Żywiecki	325.169
80	Silesian	Katowice	Katowice	294.977
81	Świętokrzyskie	Kielce	Buski, Jędrzejowski, Kazimierski, Konecki, Pińczowski, Staszowski, Włoszczowski	448.882
82	Świętokrzyskie	Kielce	Opatowski, Ostrowiecki, Sandomierski, Skarżyski, Starachowicki	427.840
83	Świętokrzyskie	Kielce	Kielce, Kielecki	405.495
84	Warmian–Masurian	Elbląg	Elbląg, Bartoszycki, Braniewski, Elbląski, Lidzbarski	327.964
85	Warmian–Masurian	Elbląg	Działdowski, Iławski, Nowomiejski, Ostródzki	312.769
86	Warmian–Masurian	Olsztyn	Olsztyn, Nidzicki, Olsztyński, Szczycieński	388.267
87	Warmian–Masurian	Olsztyn	Ełcki, Giżycki, Gołdapski, Kętrzyński, Mrągowski, Olecki, Piski, Węgorzewski	408.683
88	Greater Poland	Piła	Chodzieski, Czarnkowsko-Trzcianecki, Pilski, Wągrowiecki, Złotowski	410.953
89	Greater Poland	Piła	Grodziski, Międzychodzki, Nowotomyski, Obornicki, Szamotulski, Wolsztyński	361.240
90	Greater Poland	Poznań	Poznański	323.659
91	Greater Poland	Poznań	Poznań	513.703
92	Greater Poland	Konin	Gnieźnieński, Słupecki, Średzki, Śremski, Wrzesiński	393.471
93	Greater Poland	Konin	Konin, Kolski, Koniński, Turecki	380.307
94	Greater Poland	Kalisz	Leszno, Gostyński, Kościański, Leszczyński, Rawicki	330.137
95	Greater Poland	Kalisz	Kępiński, Krotoszyński, Ostrowski, Ostrzeszowski	349.600
96	Greater Poland	Kalisz	Kalisz, Jarociński, Kaliski, Pleszewski	319.461
97	West Pomeranian	Szczecin	Szczecin, Policki	447.703
98	West Pomeranian	Szczecin	Świnoujście, Goleniowski, Gryficki, Gryfiński, Kamieński, Łobeski, Myśliborski, Pyrzycki, Stargardzki	577.463
99	West Pomeranian	Koszalin	Białogardzki, Choszczeński, Drawski, Kołobrzeski, Świdwiński, Wałecki	338.410
100	West Pomeranian	Koszalin	Koszalin, Koszaliński, Sławieński, Szczecinecki	304.530

== See also ==
- Electoral districts of Poland
